= 2002 New Zealand Warriors season =

- NRL rank: 1st
- 2002 record: Wins: 17; draws: 0; losses: 7
- Points scored: For: 688; against: 454

Team information
- CEO: Mick Watson
- Coach: Daniel Anderson
- Assistant coach: Tony Kemp
- Captains: Stacey Jones; Ivan Cleary Monty Betham
- Stadium: Ericsson Stadium
- Avg. attendance: 16,529

Top scorers
- Tries: Clinton Toopi (18)
- Goals: Ivan Cleary (105)
- Points: Ivan Cleary (242)
← 2001	2003 →

The New Zealand Warriors 2002 season was the New Zealand Warriors 8th first-grade season. The club competed in Australasia's National Rugby League. The coach of the team was Daniel Anderson while Stacey Jones was the club captain. The club finished the year as minor premiers and made the grand final for the first time, however they were defeated 30–8 by the Sydney Roosters.

== Milestones ==
- 14 April – Round 5: The Warriors have a then record win (68–10) over the Northern Eagles.
- 14 April – Round 5: Stacey Jones played in his 150th first grade match for the club, the first person to reach the milestone.
- 14 April – Round 5: Ivan Cleary scores 28 points in a match (1 try, 12 goals), equaling the club's point scoring record set by Gene Ngamu in 1996.
- 23 June – Round 15: Henry Fa'afili played in his 50th match for the club.
- 18 August – Round 23: Clinton Toopi played in his 50th match for the club.
- 1 September – Round 25: Jerry Seuseu played in his 100th match for the club.
- 6 September – Round 26: Ivan Cleary played in his 50th match for the club.
- The Warriors claim the NRL minor premiership for the first time. The Warriors received A$100,000 prize money for finishing the regular season as minor premiers.
- Daniel Anderson is named Dally M Coach of the Year and Ali Lauitiiti Dally M Second Rower of the Year.
- 15 September: – The Warriors host their first finals match, beating Canberra 36–20 at a sold-out Ericsson Stadium.

== Jersey and sponsors ==

The Warriors had a New Jersey in 2002, completely moving away from the blue and white that had been the club's colours. The 2001 jersey was retained as an away strip.

== Fixtures ==
The Warriors used Ericsson Stadium as their home ground in 2002, their only home ground since they entered the competition in 1995.

=== Pre-season trials ===
Date	Opponent	Venue	Result	Score	Tries	Goals	Attendance	Report
17 February	Cronulla Sharks	Jade Stadium, Christchurch	Draw	30–30				
24 February	South Sydney Rabbitohs	Carlaw Park, Auckland	Win	24–20	Guttenbeil, Campion, Villasanti, Faumuina	Cleary (4)	14,000	
9 March	West Auckland Cowboys	Waitakere Stadium, Auckland	Win	66–24				

=== Regular season ===
Date	Round	Opponent	Venue	Result	Score	Tries	Goals	Attendance	Report
	Round 1	Bye							
24 March	Round 2	Sydney Roosters	Ericsson Stadium, Auckland	Win	21–14	Lauiti'iti (2), Carlaw, Meli	Cleary (2), Jones (FG)	14,378	
1 April	Round 3	Newcastle Knights	Ericsson Stadium, Auckland	Loss	14–32	Jones, Meli, Webb	Cleary (1)	13,456	
6 April	Round 4	North Queensland Cowboys	Dairy Farmers Stadium, Townsville	Win	50–20	Jones (2), Carlaw, Cleary, Faumuina, Hohaia, Tookey, Toopi	Cleary (8), Jones (1)	9,657	
14 April	Round 5	Northern Eagles	Ericsson Stadium, Auckland	Win	68–10	Jones (3), Faumuina (2), Toopi (2), Cleary, Hohaia, Seuseu, Webb	Cleary (12)	12,563	
20 April	Round 6	Canterbury Bulldogs	Westpac Stadium, Wellington	Loss	20–28	Cleary, Koopu, Toopi	Cleary (4)	24,251	
27 April	Round 7	Melbourne Storm	Ericsson Stadium, Auckland	Win	20–10	Fa'afili, Guttenbeil, Meli, Toopi	Cleary (2)	11,404	
5 May	Round 8	Wests Tigers	Campbelltown Sports Ground, Sydney	Win	36–14	Tookey (2), Carlaw, Hohaia, Koopu, Tony	Cleary (6)	13,658	
12 May	Round 9	South Sydney Rabbitohs	Ericsson Stadium, Auckland	Win	25–18	Toopi (2), Campion, Guttenbeil	Cleary (4), Marsh (FG)	14,765	
17 May	Round 10	Newcastle Knights	EnergyAustralia Stadium, Newcastle	Win	34–12	Toopi (2), Cleary, Hohaia, Tony, Webb	Cleary (5)	16,361	
25 May	Round 11	Melbourne Storm	Olympic Park Stadium, Melbourne	Win	28–12	Guttenbeil, Hohaia, Murphy, Tony	Cleary (6)	8,873	
2 June	Round 12	Cronulla Sharks	Ericsson Stadium, Auckland	Win	42–20	Guttenbeil (2), Hohaia, Koopu, Toopi, Villasanti, Webb	Cleary (7)	17,050	
9 June	Round 13	North Queensland Cowboys	Ericsson Stadium, Auckland	Win	34–6	Lauiti'iti (2), Fa'afili, Hohaia, Marsh, Toopi	Cleary (4), Jones (1)	14,616	
15 June	Round 14	South Sydney Rabbitohs	Sydney Football Stadium, Sydney	Win	46–10	Fa'afili (2), Cleary, Lauiti'iti, Marsh, Morgan, Murphy, Tookey	Cleary (7)	8,658	
23 June	Round 15	St. George Illawarra Dragons	Ericsson Stadium, Auckland	Loss	22–32	Carlaw, Fa'afili, Lauiti'iti, Toopi, Webb	Jones (1)	15,303	
30 June	Round 16	Brisbane Broncos	ANZ Stadium, Brisbane	Win	26–16	Webb (2), Fa'afili, Morgan, Toopi	Cleary (2), Jones (1)	24,907	
7 July	Round 17	Cronulla Sharks	Toyota Park, Sydney	Loss	24–36	Tony (2), Carlaw, Seuseu	Cleary (4)	15,196	
	Round 18	Bye							
21 July	Round 19	Parramatta Eels	Ericsson Stadium, Auckland	Win	26–10	Webb, Lauiti'iti, Murphy, Villasanti	Cleary (5)	15,563	
27 July	Round 20	Canberra Raiders	Canberra Stadium, Canberra	Loss	30–38	Toopi (2), V.Anderson, Lauiti'iti, Webb	Cleary (5)	8,702	
4 August	Round 21	Penrith Panthers	CUA Stadium, Sydney	Win	38–24	Swann (2), Carlaw, Jones, Lauiti'iti, Seuseu, Toopi	Cleary (5)	10,723	
10 August	Round 22	Canterbury Bulldogs	Ericsson Stadium, Auckland	Win	22–14	Cleary, Koopu, Meli, Myles	Cleary (3)	21,570	
18 August	Round 23	Brisbane Broncos	Ericsson Stadium, Auckland	Win	18–4	Cleary (2), Meli	Cleary (3)	22,125	
25 August	Round 24	Sydney Roosters	Sydney Football Stadium, Sydney	Loss	0–44			18,186	
1 September	Round 25	Northern Eagles	Brookvale Oval, Sydney	Loss	16–18	Guttenbeil, Murphy, Tookey	Jones (2)	7,529	
6 September	Round 26	Wests Tigers	Ericsson Stadium, Auckland	Win	28–12	Koopu (2), Villasanti (2), Toopi	Hohaia (4)	16,284	

=== Final series ===
Qualifying finals
1	NZ Warriors	36
8	Canberra Raiders	20
2	Brisbane Broncos	24
7	Sydney Roosters	32
3	Cronulla Sharks	20
6	Parramatta Eels	14
4	St. George-Illawarra	26
5	Canberra Raiders	20

Semifinals
4W	St. George-Illawarra	24
2L	Cronulla Sharks	40
3W	Sydney Roosters	38
1L	Newcastle Knights	12

Preliminary finals
1W	NZ Warriors	16
Cronulla Sharks	10
2W	Brisbane Broncos	12
Sydney Roosters	16

Final
NZ Warriors	8
Sydney Roosters	30

Date	Round	Opponent	Venue	Result	Score	Tries	Goals	Attendance	Report
15 September	Qualifying Final	Canberra Raiders	Ericsson Stadium, Auckland	Win	36–20	Carlaw, Fa'afili, Jones, Lauiti'iti, Meli, Tookey	Cleary (6)	25,800	
	Semi Final			Bye					
29 September	Preliminary Final	Cronulla Sharks	Telstra Stadium, Sydney	Win	16–10	Carlaw, Tony, Toopi	Cleary (2)	45,702	

=== Grand Final ===
Sydney	Position	New Zealand
Luke Phillips	FB	Ivan Cleary
Brett Mullins	WG	Justin Murphy
Shannon Hegarty	CE	John Carlaw
Justin Hodges	CE	Clinton Toopi
Anthony Minichiello	WG	Francis Meli
Brad Fittler (C)	FE	Motu Tony
Craig Wing	HB	Stacey Jones (C)
Jason Cayless	PR	Jerry Seu Seu
Simon Bonetti	HK	PJ Marsh
Peter Cusack	PR	Mark Tookey
Adrian Morley	SR	Ali Lauiti'iti
Craig Fitzgibbon	SR	Awen Guttenbeil
Luke Ricketson	LK	Kevin Campion
Chris Flannery	Bench	Lance Hohaia
Bryan Fletcher	Bench	Logan Swann
Michael Crocker	Bench	Wairangi Koopu
Andrew Lomu	Bench	Richard Villasanti
Ricky Stuart	Coach	Daniel Anderson

First Half

In the 23rd minute, Sydney opened the scoring with a try to Shannon Hegarty with Craig Fitzgibbon converting taking Sydney to a 6–0 lead. Not long after, Ivan Cleary got New Zealand on the board with a penalty goal making the score 6–2, which remained that scoreline until halftime.

Second Half

In the 46th minute, New Zealand took the lead for the first time through a Stacey Jones try and an Ivan Cleary conversion taking the scoreline to 8–6. Approaching the 60th minute, Sydney regained the lead with Craig Wing scoring the try and Craig Fitgibbon converting another to make the score 12–8 after a spectacular 40/20 kick from Sydney captain Brad Fittler. In the last 15 minutes Craig Fitzgibbon, Chris Flannery and Bryan Fletcher scored tries for Sydney with Craig Fizgibbon converting all three to take Sydney to a 30–8 win. By winning the grand final the Roosters also received A$400,000 in prize money.

30	Sydney Roosters
Tries	Hegarty, Wing, Fitzgibbon, Flannery, Fletcher
Goals	Fitzgibbon 5/5
Field goals	
8	New Zealand Warriors
Tries	Jones
Goals	Cleary 2/2
Field goals	

Clive Churchill Medal: Craig Fitzgibbon

When They Scored

23rd Minute: Sydney 6–0 (Hegarty try; Fitzgibbon goal)
29th Minute: Sydney 6–2 (Cleary goal)
46th Minute: New Zealand 8–6 (Jones try; Cleary goal)
58th Minute: Sydney 12–8 (Wing try; Fitzgibbon goal)
65th Minute: Sydney 18–8 (Fitzgibbon try; Fitzgibbon goal)
71st Minute: Sydney 24–8 (Flannery try; Fitzgibbon goal)
75th Minute: Sydney 30–8 (Fletcher try; Fitzgibbon goal)

== Ladder ==
2002 NRL season
Pos	Team	Pld	W	D	L	B	PF	PA	PD	Pts	Qualification
1	New Zealand Warriors	24	17	0	7	2	688	454	+234	38	Advance to finals series
2	Newcastle Knights	24	17	0	7	2	724	498	+226	38	Advance to finals series
3	Brisbane Broncos	24	16	1	7	2	672	425	+247	37	Advance to finals series
4	Sydney Roosters (P)	24	15	1	8	2	621	405	+216	35	Advance to finals series
5	Cronulla-Sutherland Sharks	24	15	0	9	2	653	597	+56	34	Advance to finals series
6	Parramatta Eels	24	10	2	12	2	531	440	+91	26	Advance to finals series
7	St. George Illawarra Dragons	24	9	3	12	2	632	546	+86	25	Advance to finals series
8	Canberra Raiders	24	10	1	13	2	471	641	−170	25	Advance to finals series
9	Northern Eagles	24	10	0	14	2	503	740	−237	24	
10	Melbourne Storm	24	9	1	14	2	556	586	−30	23	
11	North Queensland Cowboys	24	8	0	16	2	496	803	−307	20	
12	Penrith Panthers	24	7	0	17	2	546	654	−108	18	
13	Wests Tigers	24	7	0	17	2	498	642	−144	18	
14	South Sydney Rabbitohs	24	5	0	19	2	385	817	−432	14	
15	Canterbury-Bankstown Bulldogs	24	20	1	3	2	707	435	+272	8 (Note: The Bulldogs were deducted 37 premiership points due to gross salary cap breaches.)	

Source: National Rugby League RLP
Rules for classification: 1) competition points; 2) points differential
(P) Premiers

== Squad ==
Twenty-nine players were used by the Warriors in 2002, including six players who made their first grade debuts.

No.	Name	Nationality	Position	Warriors debut	App	T	G	FG	Pts
24	Stacey Jones	(New Zealand)	HB	23 April 1995	24	9	6	1	49
33	Awen Guttenbeil	(New Zealand) / (Tonga)	SR	14 April 1996	23	6	0	0	24
42	Logan Swann	(New Zealand)	SR	1 March 1997	17	2	0	0	8
50	Jerry Seu Seu	(New Zealand) / (Samoa)	PR	16 August 1997	23	3	0	0	12
55	Ali Lauitiiti	(New Zealand) / (Samoa)	SR	19 April 1998	25	10	0	0	40
61	Monty Betham	(New Zealand) / (Samoa)	HK / LK	8 March 1999	2	0	0	0	0
64	Wairangi Koopu	(New Zealand)	CE / SR	9 April 1999	22	6	0	0	24
65	Francis Meli	(New Zealand) / (Samoa)	WG	2 May 1999	16	6	0	0	24
66	Clinton Toopi	(New Zealand)	CE	2 May 1999	26	18	0	0	72
73	Ivan Cleary	(Australia)	FB / CE	6 February 2000	26	8	105	0	242
76	Mark Tookey	(Australia)	PR	6 February 2000	24	6	0	0	24
77	David Myles	(Australia)	CE	14 February 2000	3	1	0	0	4
80	Shontayne Hape	(New Zealand)	CE	18 March 2000	1	0	0	0	0
81	Henry Fa'afili	(New Zealand) / (Samoa)	WG	26 March 2000	17	7	0	0	28
86	Kevin Campion	(Australia) / (Ireland)	LK	18 February 2001	21	1	0	0	4
87	Richard Villasanti	(Australia) / (Tonga)	PR	18 February 2001	20	4	0	0	16
88	Justin Morgan	(Wales)	PR	25 February 2001	17	2	0	0	8
90	Motu Tony	(New Zealand) / (Samoa)	UH	9 March 2001	18	6	0	0	24
92	Justin Murphy	(France)	WG	7 April 2001	18	4	0	0	16
93	Iafeta Paleaaesina	(New Zealand) / (Samoa)	PR	1 June 2001	11	0	0	0	0
95	John Carlaw	(Australia)	CE	24 March 2002	25	8	0	0	32
96	PJ Marsh	(Australia)	HB / HK	24 March 2002	24	2	0	1	9
97	Brent Webb	(New Zealand)	FB	1 April 2002	17	9	0	0	36
98	Sione Faumuina	(New Zealand)	CE / LK	1 April 2002	8	3	0	0	12
99	Lance Hohaia	(New Zealand)	UB	6 April 2002	20	7	4	0	36
100	Vinnie Anderson	(New Zealand) / (Tonga)	CE	7 July 2002	6	1	0	0	4
101	Jeremiah Pai	(New Zealand)	FE / LK	21 July 2002	2	0	0	0	0
102	Evarn Tuimavave	(New Zealand)	PR	1 September 2002	2	0	0	0	0
103	Karl Temata	(Cook Islands)	PR / SR	6 September 2002	1	0	0	0	0

== Staff ==
- Chief executive officer: Mick Watson

=== Coaching staff ===
- Head coach: Daniel Anderson
- Assistant coach: Tony Kemp
- Video analysis: Rohan Smith

== Transfers ==
=== Gains ===
Player	Previous club	Length	Notes
John Carlaw	Wests Tigers		
PJ Marsh	Parramatta Eels		
Brent Webb	Wests Panthers		
Sione Faumuina	Canberra Raiders		

=== Losses ===
Player	Club	Notes
Richie Blackmore	Retired	
Jason Death	South Sydney Rabbitohs	
Cliff Beverley	Barrow Raiders	
Jonathan Smith		
Nathan Wood	Wakefield Trinity Wildcats	
Jason Temu	Retired	

== Other teams ==
Players not required by the Warriors were released to play in the 2002 Bartercard Cup. This included Iafeta Paleaaesina and Karl Temata for the Hibiscus Coast Raiders, Sione Faumuina for the Glenora Bears, Evarn Tuimavave for the Marist-Richmond Brothers, Vinnie Anderson for the Mount Albert Lions, Jeremiah Pai for the Otahuhu Leopards, Logan Swann for the Eastern Tornadoes and Henry Fa'afili and Lance Hohaia for the Manurewa Marlins.

== Awards ==
Ali Lauiti'iti won the club's Player of the Year award.
