= 2002 South Sydney Rabbitohs season =

- NRL rank: 14th (out of 15)
- Play-off result: N/A
- 2002 record: Wins: 5; draws: 0; losses: 19
- Points scored: For: 385; against: 817

Team information
- Coach: Craig Coleman
- Captain: Adam Muir
- Stadium: ANZ Stadium

Top scorers
- Tries: Brent Grose (9)
- Goals: Scott McLean (24)
- Points: Scott McLean (72)
← 1999	2003 →

The 2002 South Sydney Rabbitohs season was the 93rd in the club's history and the 1st since 1999. Coached by Craig Coleman and captained by Adam Muir, Andrew Hart and Jason Death, they competed in the National Rugby League's 2002 Telstra Premiership, finishing the regular season 14th out of 15 teams, failing to reach the finals.

== Ladder ==
2002 NRL season
Pos	Team	Pld	W	D	L	B	PF	PA	PD	Pts
1	New Zealand Warriors	24	17	0	7	2	688	454	+234	38
2	Newcastle Knights	24	17	0	7	2	724	498	+226	38
3	Brisbane Broncos	24	16	1	7	2	672	425	+247	37
4	Sydney Roosters (P)	24	15	1	8	2	621	405	+216	35
5	Cronulla-Sutherland Sharks	24	15	0	9	2	653	597	+56	34
6	Parramatta Eels	24	10	2	12	2	531	440	+91	26
7	St George Illawarra Dragons	24	9	3	12	2	632	546	+86	25
8	Canberra Raiders	24	10	1	13	2	471	641	-170	25
9	Northern Eagles	24	10	0	14	2	503	740	-237	24
10	Melbourne Storm	24	9	1	14	2	556	586	-30	23
11	North Queensland Cowboys	24	8	0	16	2	496	803	-307	20
12	Penrith Panthers	24	7	0	17	2	546	654	-108	18
13	Wests Tigers	24	7	0	17	2	498	642	-144	18
14	South Sydney Rabbitohs	24	5	0	19	2	385	817	-432	14
15	Canterbury-Bankstown Bulldogs	24	20	1	3	2	707	435	+272	8^{1}

^{1} The Bulldogs were deducted 37 premiership points due to gross salary cap breaches.

== Fixtures ==
=== Regular season ===
Round	Opponent	Result	Score	Date	Venue	Crowd	Ref
1	Sydney Roosters	Loss	6 – 40	Saturday 15 March	Aussie Stadium	35,316	
2	Canberra Raiders	Win	30 – 22	Sunday 23 March	Canberra Stadium	17,111	
3	Northern Eagles	Win	44 – 20	Saturday 30 March	Aussie Stadium	15,825	
4	Canterbury-Bankstown Bulldogs	Loss	6 – 32	Friday 5 April	Dairy Farmers Stadium	22,825	
5	North Queensland Cowboys	Loss	18 – 30	Saturday 13 April	Aussie Stadium	11,014	
6	Parramatta Eels	Loss	14 – 22	Monday 22 April	Aussie Stadium	16,979	
7	BYE						
8	Brisbane Broncos	Loss	16 – 42	Friday 3 May	Aussie Stadium	14,874	
9	New Zealand Warriors	Loss	18 – 25	Sunday 12 May	Ericsson Stadium	14,765	
10	Canberra Raiders	Loss	26 – 20	Sunday 19 May	Aussie Stadium	9,599	
11	Newcastle Knights	Win	16 – 42	Sunday 26 May	Energy Australia Stadium	13,281	
12	Canterbury-Bankstown Bulldogs	Loss	18 – 28	Sunday 2 June	Sydney Showground Stadium	8,105	
13	Sydney Roosters	Loss	6 – 42	Monday 10 June	Aussie Stadium	15,891	
14	New Zealand Warriors	Loss	10 – 46	Saturday 15 June	Aussie Stadium	8,658	
15	Melbourne Storm	Loss	6 – 44	Saturday 22 June	Olympic Park	9,912	
16	Newcastle Knights	Loss	8 – 26	Saturday 29 June	Aussie Stadium	7,828	
17	Penrith Panthers	Win	23 – 16	Sunday 6 July	Penrith Park	10,672	
18	Wests Tigers	Win	38 – 24	Saturday 12 July	Leichhardt	16,266	
19	St. George Illawarra Dragons	Loss	10 – 48	Sunday 20 July	Aussie Stadium	15,219	
20	Cronulla-Sutherland Sharks	Loss	6 – 22	Saturday 27 July	Toyota Stadium	14,163	
21	Wests Tigers	Loss	4 – 50	Sunday 4 August	Aussie Stadium	10,624	
22	Parramatta Eels	Loss	0 – 54	Saturday 10 August	Parramatta Stadium	10,148	
23	St. George Illawarra Dragons	Loss	16 – 58	Sunday 18 August	WIN Stadium	12,122	
24	Penrith Panthers	Loss	12 – 28	Saturday 24 August	NorthPower Stadium	10,573	
25	North Queensland Cowboys	Loss	34 – 36	Saturday 31 August	Aussie Stadium	9,129	
26	BYE						
