= 2002 NRL season =

Rugby league competition

2002 National Rugby League
- Duration: 15 March – 6 October 2002
- Teams: 15
- Premiers: Sydney (12th title)
- Minor premiers: New Zealand (1st title)
- Matches played: 189
- Points scored: 9083
- Average attendance: 14,054
- Total attendance: 2,656,198
- Top points scorer: Hazem El Masri (254)
- Wooden spoon: Canterbury-Bankstown Bulldogs (4th spoon)
- Dally M Medal: Andrew Johns
- Top try-scorer: Nigel Vagana (23)

The 2002 NRL season was the 95th season of professional rugby league football in Australia and the fifth to be run by the National Rugby League. The season was affected by the competition-leading Canterbury-Bankstown Bulldogs' salary cap breach finding, which saw them relegated to the bottom of the NRL ladder. As a result, the New Zealand Warriors won their first minor premiership and made it to the grand final for the first time, playing against foundation club the Sydney Roosters who won the match and collected their first premiership in 27 years.

== Pre-season ==
In February 2002 the National Rugby League's Director of Legal and Business Affairs, David Gallop, was appointed chief executive officer of the NRL, succeeding David Moffett.

The legendary Broncos and Maroons halfback, Allan Langer, returned from England to play his final season of professional football with the Brisbane club. In doing so he became the NRL's oldest player for the 2002 season at 36 years and 60 days.

=== The return of South Sydney ===
Following the club's departure from the NRL after the 1999 season, there was a continuing push from both fans and the wider rugby league community to reinstate the South Sydney Rabbitohs into the NRL competition. After two unsuccessful years of lobbying, South Sydney finally received a court ruling in their favour in 2001. On 15 March 2002, the South Sydney club opened the NRL season with a home match against long-time rivals, the Sydney Roosters, losing 40-6.

It turned out to be a tough year for the club, winning only five matches from 24 played, though would be spared the wooden spoon by the Bulldogs' salary cap scandal (see below).

== Teams ==
The number of teams contesting the Premiership increased for the 2002 season from 14 to 15 due to the re-inclusion of the South Sydney Rabbitohs. It was the first time the number of Premiership teams had increased since the 1995 ARL season when the introduction of the Auckland Warriors, North Queensland Cowboys, South Queensland Crushers and Western Reds saw the number of teams increase from 16 to 20.

Brisbane Broncos; 15th season Ground: Queensland Sport and Athletics Centre; Coach: Wayne Bennett; Captain: Gorden Tallis	Bulldogs; 68th season Ground: Sydney Showground; Coach: Steve Folkes; Captain: Steve Price	Canberra Raiders; 21st season Ground: Canberra Stadium; Coach: Matthew Elliott; Captain: Simon Woolford	Melbourne Storm; 5th season Ground Olympic Park Stadium; Coach: Mark Murray; Captain: Robbie Kearns	New Zealand Warriors; 8th season Ground: Mt Smart Stadium; Coach: Daniel Anderson; Captain: Stacey Jones & Monty Betham
Newcastle Knights; 15th season Ground: Newcastle International Sports Centre; Coach: Michael Hagan; Captain: Andrew Johns	North Queensland Cowboys; 8th season Ground: Willows Sports Complex; Coach: Murray Hurst → Graham Murray; Captain: Paul Bowman	Northern Eagles; 3rd season Ground: Brookvale Oval & Central Coast Stadium; Coach: Peter Sharp; Captain: Steve Menzies	Parramatta Eels; 56th season Ground: Parramatta Stadium; Coach: Brian Smith; Captain: Nathan Cayless	Penrith Panthers; 36th season Ground: Penrith Stadium; Coach: John Lang; Captain: Craig Gower
Sharks; 38th season Ground: Shark Park; Coach: Chris Anderson; Captain: David Peachey	South Sydney Rabbitohs; 93rd season Ground: Sydney Football Stadium; Coach: Craig Coleman; Captain: Adam Muir	St. George Illawarra Dragons; 4th season Ground: Kogarah Oval & WIN Stadium; Coach: Andrew Farrar; Captain: Trent Barrett	Sydney Roosters; 95th season Ground: Sydney Football Stadium; Coach: Ricky Stuart; Captain: Brad Fittler	Wests Tigers; 3rd season Ground: Campbelltown Stadium & Leichhardt Oval; Coach: Terry Lamb; Captain: Darren Senter

== Regular season ==
In 2002, as in 2001, the NRL's advertising was handled by Saatchi & Saatchi Sydney. As in the previous season, there was no big budget season launch advertising campaign. The NRL focussed on stretching its marketing spending throughout the season with newspaper ads promoting individual rounds and clubs, and with simple TV ads to promote key games.

The Bulldogs won 17 games in a row and had an unbeaten run of 18 games, the most in the club's history. However they were deducted 37 premiership points for a gross salary cap breaches, the most points deducted in premiership history. That left the club with just four competition points attained from the two byes earlier in the season. Four more competition points followed since the salary cap scandal, all from wins in the last two rounds of the season.

The New Zealand Warriors won the club's first Minor Premiership in its 8-year history and also made it to their first Grand Final. The Warriors were not in first place almost during the entire season, only taking top spot on the ladder at the conclusion of Round 26.

John Hopoate ran 3,976 metres with the ball in 2002, more than any other player in the competition.

At the end of the season NRL referees' coach Peter Louis resigned from his position.

Until 2026, 2002 was the most recent season in which the Melbourne Storm did not qualify for the finals due to not winning enough games (though in 2010 they were sentenced to finish last due to salary cap breaches which prevented the club from earning any premiership points that season).

=== Bulldogs salary cap breach ===
In mid-2002, the Canterbury club were found guilty of serious and systemic breaches of the salary cap. NRL Chief Executive David Gallop described the violation as "exceptional in both its size and its deliberate and ongoing nature". The club received a $500,000 fine, and was stripped of 37 of its 41 competition points accumulated up to Round 23. The latter action was particularly harmful, as the club were poised to take the Minor Premiership and had won 17 consecutive matches (the second highest in Australian club rugby league history at the time). The deduction of the 37 competition points meant that the Canterbury side would win the wooden spoon, as the South Sydney Rabbitohs had already accumulated 12 competition points by the end of Round 24.

The deduction of Canterbury's points also enabled the Canberra Raiders to make the finals with a points differential of -170, the poorest such record of any finalist in the competition's history, and the Raiders only won one game outside of Canberra for the entire season. It also enabled the New Zealand Warriors to secure their first minor premiership in the club's history.

Team	1	2	3	4	5	6	7	8	9	10	11	12	13	14	15	16	17	18	19	20	21	22	23	24	25	26	F1	F2	F3	GF
Brisbane Broncos	NQL +36	**CBY**; **0**	SYD +14	**CRO** **+2**	CAN +2	**PEN** **+4**	**NEW** **+6**	SOU +26	**NTE** **+38**	X	SGI −8	WTI +14	**PAR** **−4**	**NQL** **+44**	X	**NZL** **−10**	**SGI** **+12**	PEN +18	**WTI** **+32**	PAR +20	MEL +28	**SYD** **−10**	NZL −14	NEW −30	**CAN** **+34**	CBY −7	**PAR** **+10**	X	SYD −4	
Canberra Raiders	MEL −4	**SOU** **−8**	WTI +5	NEW −46	**BRI** **−2**	NTE −24	PAR −38	**CRO** **+26**	SGI; 0	SOU −6	**NQL** **+12**	**NTE** **+12**	X	CRO −10	CBY −40	**PEN** **+12**	SYD −30	**NEW** **+6**	NQL −16	**NZL** **+8**	X	**WTI** **+20**	**SYD** **−26**	**CBY** **+4**	BRI −34	**MEL** **+9**	NZL −16			
Canterbury-Bankstown Bulldogs	**WTI** **−6**	BRI; 0	**SGI** **+19**	SOU +26	MEL +16	NZL +8	CRO +20	X	**PEN** **+3**	**CRO** **+26**	NTE +18	**SOU** **+10**	PEN +14	X	**CAN** **+40**	PAR +14	**NTE** **+20**	SGI +2	**SYD** **+12**	NEW +1	NQL +8	NZL −8	**PAR** **+18**	CAN −4	**MEL** **+8**	**BRI** **+7**				
Cronulla-Sutherland Sharks	SGI +6	**MEL** **+6**	**PEN** **+8**	BRI −2	**WTI** **+6**	NEW −44	**CBY** **−20**	CAN −26	**PAR** **−30**	CBY −26	PEN −2	NZL −22	**SGI** **+21**	**CAN** **+10**	NQL +30	X	**NZL** **+12**	PAR +1	NTE +22	**SOU** **+16**	SYD +14	**NEW** **+50**	WTI +16	**NQL** **+22**	X	**SYD** **−12**	SYD −12	**SGI** **+16**	**NZL** **−6**	
Melbourne Storm	**CAN** **+4**	CRO −6	**NQL** **+28**	PAR +2	**CBY** **−16**	**SGI** **+8**	NZL −10	**NEW** **−8**	SYD −28	**PAR** **−2**	**NZL** **−16**	X	NEW −21	SGI; 0	**SOU** **+38**	NTE −14	**WTI** **+6**	**SYD** **+38**	X	PEN −20	**BRI** **−28**	NQL +10	**PEN** **+32**	WTI −10	CBY −8	CAN −9				
Newcastle Knights	NTE +26	**NQL** **+32**	NZL +18	**CAN** **+46**	SYD +16	**CRO** **+44**	BRI −6	MEL +8	X	**NZL** **−22**	**SOU** **+26**	X	**MEL** **+21**	PAR +14	WTI −16	SOU +18	**PAR** **+6**	CAN −6	**PEN** **+16**	**CBY** **−1**	**SGI** **+8**	CRO −50	**NTE** **+14**	**BRI** **+30**	PEN +2	SGI −18	**SGI** **−4**	SYD −26		
New Zealand Warriors	X	**SYD** **+7**	**NEW** **−18**	NQL +30	**NTE** **+58**	**CBY** **−8**	**MEL** **+10**	WTI +22	**SOU** **+7**	NEW +22	MEL +16	**CRO** **+22**	**NQL** **+28**	SOU +36	**SGI** **−10**	BRI +10	CRO −12	X	**PAR** **+16**	CAN −8	PEN +14	**CBY** **+8**	**BRI** **+14**	SYD −44	NTE −2	**WTI** **+16**	**CAN** **+16**	X	CRO +6	SYD −22
North Queensland Cowboys	**BRI** **−36**	NEW −32	MEL −28	**NZL** **−30**	**SOU** **+12**	SYD −46	PEN +10	PAR −1	**WTI** **+24**	**PEN** **−30**	CAN −12	**SGI** **+8**	NZL −28	BRI −44	**CRO** **−30**	SGI −27	X	**NTE** **−16**	**CAN** **+16**	NTE +12	**CBY** **−8**	**MEL** **−10**	X	CRO −22	SOU +2	**PAR** **+9**				
Northern Eagles	**NEW** **−26**	X	SOU −24	**SYD** **+6**	NZL −58	**CAN** **+24**	WTI −18	**SGI** **+4**	BRI −38	X	**CBY** **−18**	CAN −12	**WTI** **+24**	SYD −27	PEN +4	**MEL** **+14**	CBY −20	NQL +16	**CRO** **−22**	**NQL** **−12**	**PAR** **+9**	SGI +2	NEW −14	PAR −13	**NZL** **+2**	**PEN** **−40**				
Parramatta Eels	**PEN** **+58**	WTI −6	X	**MEL** **−2**	SGI; 0	SOU +8	**CAN** **+38**	**NQL** **+1**	CRO +30	MEL +2	**SYD** **−14**	X	BRI +4	**NEW** **−14**	SYD; 0	**CBY** **−14**	NEW −6	**CRO** **−1**	NZL −16	**BRI** **−20**	NTE −9	**SOU** **+54**	CBY −18	**NTE** **+13**	**WTI** **+12**	NQL −9	BRI −10			
Penrith Panthers	PAR −58	**SGI** **−8**	CRO −8	**WTI** **−16**	X	BRI −4	**NQL** **−10**	SYD −4	CBY −3	NQL +30	**CRO** **+2**	**SYD** **+10**	**CBY** **−14**	WTI +4	**NTE** **−4**	CAN −12	**SOU** **−7**	**BRI** **−18**	NEW −16	**MEL** **+20**	**NZL** **−14**	X	MEL −32	SOU +16	**NEW** **−2**	NTE +40				
South Sydney Rabbitohs	SYD −34	CAN +8	**NTE** **+24**	**CBY** **−26**	NQL −12	**PAR** **−8**	X	**BRI** **−26**	NZL −7	**CAN** **+6**	NEW −26	CBY −10	SYD −36	**NZL** **−36**	MEL −38	**NEW** **−18**	PEN +7	WTI +14	**SGI** **−38**	CRO −16	**WTI** **−46**	PAR −54	SGI −42	**PEN** **−16**	**NQL** **−2**	X				
St. George Illawarra Dragons	**CRO** **−6**	PEN +8	CBY −19	X	**PAR**; **0**	MEL −8	SYD −4	NTE −4	**CAN**; **0**	**WTI** **+11**	**BRI** **+8**	NQL −8	CRO −21	**MEL**; **0**	NZL +10	**NQL** **+27**	BRI −12	**CBY** **−2**	SOU +38	WTI +34	NEW −8	**NTE** **−2**	**SOU** **+42**	X	SYD −16	**NEW** **+18**	NEW +4	CRO −16		
Sydney Roosters	**SOU** **+34**	NZL −7	**BRI** **−14**	NTE −6	**NEW** **−16**	**NQL** **+46**	**SGI** **+4**	**PEN** **+4**	**MEL** **+28**	X	PAR +14	PEN −10	**SOU** **+36**	**NTE** **+27**	**PAR**; **0**	WTI +2	**CAN** **+30**	MEL −38	CBY −12	X	**CRO** **−14**	BRI +10	CAN +26	**NZL** **+44**	**SGI** **+16**	CRO +12	**CRO** **+12**	**NEW** **+26**	**BRI** **+4**	**NZL** **+22**
Wests Tigers	CBY +6	**PAR** **+6**	**CAN** **−5**	PEN +16	CRO −6	X	**NTE** **+18**	**NZL** **−22**	NQL −24	SGI −11	X	**BRI** **−14**	NTE −24	**PEN** **−4**	**NEW** **+16**	**SYD** **−2**	MEL −6	**SOU** **−14**	BRI −32	**SGI** **−34**	SOU +46	CAN −20	**CRO** **−16**	**MEL** **+10**	PAR −12	NZL −16				
Team	1	2	3	4	5	6	7	8	9	10	11	12	13	14	15	16	17	18	19	20	21	22	23	24	25	26	F1	F2	F3	GF

Bold – Home game
X – Bye
Opponent for round listed above margin

=== Ladder ===
The Warriors received A$100,000 prize money for finishing the regular season as minor premiers.

2002 NRL season
Pos	Team	Pld	W	D	L	B	PF	PA	PD	Pts	Qualification
1	New Zealand Warriors	24	17	0	7	2	688	454	+234	38	Advance to finals series
2	Newcastle Knights	24	17	0	7	2	724	498	+226	38	Advance to finals series
3	Brisbane Broncos	24	16	1	7	2	672	425	+247	37	Advance to finals series
4	Sydney Roosters (P)	24	15	1	8	2	621	405	+216	35	Advance to finals series
5	Cronulla-Sutherland Sharks	24	15	0	9	2	653	597	+56	34	Advance to finals series
6	Parramatta Eels	24	10	2	12	2	531	440	+91	26	Advance to finals series
7	St. George Illawarra Dragons	24	9	3	12	2	632	546	+86	25	Advance to finals series
8	Canberra Raiders	24	10	1	13	2	471	641	−170	25	Advance to finals series
9	Northern Eagles	24	10	0	14	2	503	740	−237	24	
10	Melbourne Storm	24	9	1	14	2	556	586	−30	23	
11	North Queensland Cowboys	24	8	0	16	2	496	803	−307	20	
12	Penrith Panthers	24	7	0	17	2	546	654	−108	18	
13	Wests Tigers	24	7	0	17	2	498	642	−144	18	
14	South Sydney Rabbitohs	24	5	0	19	2	385	817	−432	14	
15	Canterbury-Bankstown Bulldogs	24	20	1	3	2	707	435	+272	8 (Note: The Bulldogs were deducted 37 premiership points due to gross salary cap breaches.)	

Source: National Rugby League RLP
Rules for classification: 1) competition points; 2) points differential
(P) Premiers

=== Ladder progression ===
- Numbers highlighted in green indicate that the team finished the round inside the top 8.
- Numbers highlighted in blue indicates the team finished first on the ladder in that round.
- Numbers highlighted in red indicates the team finished in last place on the ladder in that round
- Underlined numbers indicate that the team had a bye during that round.

	Team	1	2	3	4	5	6	7	8	9	10	11	12	13	14	15	16	17	18	19	20	21	22	23	24	25	26
1	New Zealand	2	4	4	6	8	8	10	12	14	16	18	20	22	24	24	26	26	28	30	30	32	34	36	36	36	38
2	Newcastle	2	4	6	8	10	12	12	14	16	16	18	20	22	24	24	26	28	28	30	30	32	32	34	36	38	38
3	Brisbane	2	3	5	7	9	11	13	15	17	19	19	21	21	23	25	25	27	29	31	33	35	35	35	35	37	37
4	**Sydney**	2	2	2	2	2	4	6	8	10	12	14	14	16	18	19	21	23	23	23	25	25	27	29	31	33	35
5	Sharks	2	4	6	6	8	8	8	8	8	8	8	8	10	12	14	16	18	20	22	24	26	28	30	32	34	34
6	Parramatta	2	2	4	4	5	7	9	11	13	15	15	17	19	19	20	20	20	20	20	20	20	22	22	24	26	26
7	St George Illawarra	0	2	2	4	5	5	5	5	6	8	10	10	10	11	13	15	15	15	17	19	19	19	21	23	23	25
8	Canberra	0	0	2	2	2	2	2	4	5	5	7	9	11	11	11	13	13	15	15	17	19	21	21	23	23	25
9	Northern Eagles	0	2	2	4	4	6	6	8	8	10	10	10	12	12	14	16	16	18	18	18	20	22	22	22	24	24
10	Melbourne	2	2	4	6	6	8	8	8	8	8	8	10	10	11	13	13	15	17	19	19	19	21	23	23	23	23
11	North Queensland	0	0	0	0	2	2	4	4	6	6	6	8	8	8	8	8	10	10	12	14	14	14	16	16	18	20
12	Penrith	0	0	0	0	2	2	2	2	2	4	6	8	8	10	10	10	10	10	10	12	12	14	14	16	16	18
13	Wests	2	4	4	6	6	8	10	10	10	10	12	12	12	12	14	14	14	14	14	14	16	16	16	18	18	18
14	South Sydney	0	2	4	4	4	4	6	6	6	8	8	8	8	8	8	8	10	12	12	12	12	12	12	12	12	14
15	Bulldogs	0	1	3	5	7	9	11	13	15	17	19	21	23	25	27	29	31	33	35	37	39	39	41	4	6	8

== Finals series ==
To decide the grand finalists from the top eight finishing teams, the NRL adopts the McIntyre final eight system.

Coincidentally, the finalists for 2002 were almost the same as the previous season, with the exception of the Bulldogs being replaced by Canberra. Had the Bulldogs not been deducted competition points, they would have become the minor premiers and completed the replication, with Canberra moving down to 9th.

Home	Score	Away	Match Information
Home	Score	Away	Date and Time	Venue	Referee	Crowd
Qualifying Finals
Sydney Roosters	32 – 20	Cronulla-Sutherland Sharks	13 September 2002	Aussie Stadium	Paul Simpkins	25,366
Brisbane Broncos	24 – 14	Parramatta Eels	14 September 2002	ANZ Stadium	Sean Hampstead	19,115
Newcastle Knights	22 – 26	St George Illawarra Dragons	14 September 2002	Energy Australia Stadium	Bill Harrigan	21,051
New Zealand Warriors	36 – 20	Canberra Raiders	15 September 2002	Ericsson Stadium	Tim Mander	25,800
Semi-finals
St George Illawarra Dragons	24 – 40	Cronulla-Sutherland Sharks	21 September 2002	Aussie Stadium	Bill Harrigan	31,783
Sydney Roosters	38 – 12	Newcastle Knights	22 September 2002	Aussie Stadium	Sean Hampstead	23,816
Preliminary Finals
Brisbane Broncos	12 – 16	Sydney Roosters	28 September 2002	Aussie Stadium	Bill Harrigan	28,251
New Zealand Warriors	16 – 10	Cronulla-Sutherland Sharks	29 September 2002	Telstra Stadium	Tim Mander	45,782

=== Chart ===
Qualifying finals
1	New Zealand	36
8	Canberra	20
2	Newcastle	22
7	St. George Illawarra	26
3	Brisbane	24
6	Parramatta	14
4	Sydney	32
5	Cronulla	20

Semifinals
4W	St. George Illawarra	24
2L	Cronulla	40
3W	Sydney	38
1L	Newcastle	12

Preliminary finals
1W	New Zealand	16
Cronulla	10
2W	Brisbane	12
Sydney	16

Final
New Zealand	8
Sydney	30

== Grand Final ==
The 2002 NRL Grand Final was the conclusive and premiership-deciding game of the 2002 NRL season. It took place on Sunday, 6 October 2002, at Sydney's Telstra Stadium. 80,130 people saw the Sydney Roosters beat the New Zealand Warriors 30–8. The Clive Churchill Medalist was Craig Fitzgibbon of the Sydney Roosters. The match was also broadcast live in the United States by Fox Sports World.

2002 NRL Grand Final

Sunday, 6 October
19:00 AEST (UTC+10)

New Zealand Warriors	8 – 30	Sydney Roosters
Tries: 1 Jones 46'; Goals: 2 Cleary pen 29', 47' (2/2)	1st: 2–6; 2nd: 6–24; Report	Tries: 5 Hegarty 23'; Wing 57'; Fitzgibbon 65'; Flannery 71'; Fletcher 74'; Goals: 5 Fitzgibbon 25', 59', 66', 71', 76' (5/5)

Telstra Stadium, Sydney
Attendance: 80,130
Referee: Bill Harrigan
Touch judges: Steve Richards, Shayne Hayne
Clive Churchill Medal: Craig Fitzgibbon (Sydney)

== Player statistics ==
The following statistics are as of the conclusion of Round 26.

Top 5 point scorers

Points	Player	Tries	Goals	Field Goals
254	Hazem El Masri	12	103	0
246	Andrew Johns	10	102	2
233	Brett Kimmorley	13	90	1
222	Ivan Cleary	8	95	0
174	Michael De Vere	6	75	0

Top 5 try scorers

Tries	Player
23	Nigel Vagana
19	Timana Tahu
19	Rhys Wesser
17	Clinton Toopi
17	Lee Hookey
17	Aaron Moule
17	Luke Lewis

Top 5 goal scorers

Goals	Player
103	Hazem El Masri
102	Andrew Johns
95	Ivan Cleary
90	Brett Kimmorley
75	Michael De Vere

== 2002 Transfers ==
=== Players ===
Player	2001 Club	2002 Club
Darren Burns	Brisbane Broncos	Super League: Warrington Wolves
Mark Corvo	Brisbane Broncos	Super League: Salford City Reds
Luke Priddis	Brisbane Broncos	Penrith Panthers
Wendell Sailor	Brisbane Broncos	Queensland Reds (Super 12)
Kevin Walters	Brisbane Broncos	Retirement
Anthony Colella	Canberra Raiders	South Sydney Rabbitohs
Andrew McFadden	Canberra Raiders	Parramatta Eels
Lesley Vainikolo	Canberra Raiders	Super League: Bradford Bulls
Luke Williamson	Canberra Raiders	Northern Eagles
Darren Britt	Canterbury-Bankstown Bulldogs	Super League: St. Helens
Steven Hughes	Canterbury-Bankstown Bulldogs	Retirement
Adam Peek	Canterbury-Bankstown Bulldogs	South Sydney Rabbitohs
Craig Polla-Mounter	Canterbury-Bankstown Bulldogs	Retirement
Rod Silva	Canterbury-Bankstown Bulldogs	Retirement
Barry Ward	Canterbury-Bankstown Bulldogs	Super League: St. Helens
Matt Daylight	Cronulla-Sutherland Sharks	Retirement
Shannon Donato	Cronulla-Sutherland Sharks	Penrith Panthers
Adam Dykes	Cronulla-Sutherland Sharks	Parramatta Eels
Jason Ferris	Cronulla-Sutherland Sharks	Northern Eagles
Martin Lang	Cronulla-Sutherland Sharks	Penrith Panthers
Nathan Long	Cronulla-Sutherland Sharks	Northern Eagles
Paul McNicholas	Cronulla-Sutherland Sharks	South Sydney Rabbitohs
Russell Richardson	Cronulla-Sutherland Sharks	South Sydney Rabbitohs
Mat Rogers	Cronulla-Sutherland Sharks	New South Wales Waratahs (Super 12)
Sean Ryan	Cronulla-Sutherland Sharks	Super League: Hull F.C.
Luke Stuart	Cronulla-Sutherland Sharks	South Sydney Rabbitohs
Russell Bawden	Melbourne Storm	Super League: London Broncos
Tasesa Lavea	Melbourne Storm	Northern Eagles
Ben Roarty	Melbourne Storm	Penrith Panthers
Brad Watts	Melbourne Storm	South Sydney Rabbitohs
Darren Albert	Newcastle Knights	Super League: St. Helens
Troy Fletcher	Newcastle Knights	Retirement
Glenn Grief	Newcastle Knights	South Sydney Rabbitohs
Paul Marquet	Newcastle Knights	Super League: Warrington Wolves
Richie Blackmore	New Zealand Warriors	Retirement
Jason Death	New Zealand Warriors	South Sydney Rabbitohs
Geoff Bell	North Queensland Cowboys	Penrith Panthers
Brett Hetherington	North Queensland Cowboys	Retirement
Danny Moore	North Queensland Cowboys	Retirement
Julian O'Neill	North Queensland Cowboys	Super League: Wigan Warriors
Lee Oudenryn	North Queensland Cowboys	Retirement
Mark Shipway	North Queensland Cowboys	Northern Eagles
Damien Smith	North Queensland Cowboys	Retirement
Kyle Warren	North Queensland Cowboys	Super League: Castleford Tigers
Greg Ebrill	Northern Eagles	Super League: Salford City Reds
Wayne Evans	Northern Eagles	Super League: London Broncos
Brett Kimmorley	Northern Eagles	Cronulla-Sutherland Sharks
Andrew King	Northern Eagles	South Sydney Rabbitohs
William Leyshon	Northern Eagles	Melbourne Storm
Karl Lovell	Northern Eagles	Cronulla-Sutherland Sharks
Adam Muir	Northern Eagles	South Sydney Rabbitohs
Mark O'Meley	Northern Eagles	Canterbury-Bankstown Bulldogs
Paul Stringer	Northern Eagles	South Sydney Rabbitohs
Geoff Toovey	Northern Eagles	Retirement
Steve Trindall	Northern Eagles	Wests Tigers
Ben Walker	Northern Eagles	Super League: Leeds Rhinos
PJ Marsh	Parramatta Eels	New Zealand Warriors
Jason Taylor	Parramatta Eels	Retirement
David Westley	Parramatta Eels	Northern Eagles
Matt Adamson	Penrith Panthers	Super League: Leeds Rhinos
Robbie Beckett	Penrith Panthers	Super League: Halifax Blue Sox
Steve Carter	Penrith Panthers	Super League: Widnes Vikings
Craig Greenhill	Penrith Panthers	Super League: Hull F.C.
Andrew Hinson	Penrith Panthers	South Sydney Rabbitohs
Peter Jorgensen	Penrith Panthers	Northampton Saints (English rugby union)
Duncan MacGillivray	Penrith Panthers	South Sydney Rabbitohs
Frank Puletua	Penrith Panthers	South Sydney Rabbitohs
Matthew Rieck	Penrith Panthers	Cronulla-Sutherland Sharks
Matthew Rodwell	Penrith Panthers	Super League: Warrington Wolves
David Woods	Penrith Panthers	Super League: Halifax Blue Sox
Jamie Ainscough	St. George Illawarra Dragons	Super League: Wigan Warriors
Wayne Bartrim	St. George Illawarra Dragons	Super League: Castleford Tigers
Jamie Fitzgerald	St. George Illawarra Dragons	South Sydney Rabbitohs
Wade Forrester	St. George Illawarra Dragons	Northern Eagles
Andrew Hart	St. George Illawarra Dragons	South Sydney Rabbitohs
Paul McGregor	St. George Illawarra Dragons	Retirement
Craig Smith	St. George Illawarra Dragons	Super League: Wigan Warriors
Darren Treacy	St. George Illawarra Dragons	Super League: Salford City Reds
Colin Ward	St. George Illawarra Dragons	Penrith Panthers
Quentin Pongia	Sydney Roosters	Villeneuve Leopards (Elite One Championship)
Ian Rubin	Sydney Roosters	Retirement
Matt Sing	Sydney Roosters	North Queensland Cowboys
John Carlaw	Wests Tigers	New Zealand Warriors
Owen Craigie	Wests Tigers	South Sydney Rabbitohs
Craig Field	Wests Tigers	Pia Donkeys (French Rugby League Championship)
Lee Murphy	Wests Tigers	Retirement
John Simon	Wests Tigers	Retirement
Tyran Smith	Wests Tigers	Canberra Raiders
Shane Walker	Wests Tigers	Melbourne Storm
Shane Rigon	Super League: Bradford Bulls	South Sydney Rabbitohs
Ben Kusto	Super League: Huddersfield Giants	Parramatta Eels
Luke Felsch	Super League: Hull F.C.	St. George Illawarra Dragons
Tony Grimaldi	Super League: Hull F.C.	Canterbury-Bankstown Bulldogs
Robert Mears	Super League: Leeds Rhinos	Wests Tigers
Brett Mullins	Super League: Leeds Rhinos	Sydney Roosters
Glen Air	Super League: London Broncos	Wests Tigers
Shane Millard	Super League: London Broncos	St. George Illawarra Dragons
Justin Brooker	Super League: Wakefield Trinity Wildcats	South Sydney Rabbitohs
Andrew Gee	Super League: Warrington Wolves	Brisbane Broncos
David Kidwell	Super League: Warrington Wolves	Sydney Roosters
Allan Langer	Super League: Warrington Wolves	Brisbane Broncos
Danny Nutley	Super League: Warrington Wolves	Cronulla-Sutherland Sharks
Ian Sibbit	Super League: Warrington Wolves	Melbourne Storm
Matthew Johns	Super League: Wigan Warriors	Cronulla-Sutherland Sharks
Ken McGuinness	Toowoomba Clydesdales (Queensland Cup)	North Queensland Cowboys
Chris Caruana	N/A	South Sydney Rabbitohs
Joe Galuvao	N/A	Penrith Panthers

=== Coaches ===
Coach	2001 Club	2002 Club
John Lang	Cronulla-Sutherland Sharks	Penrith Panthers
