= 2002 St. George Illawarra Dragons season =

- NRL rank: 7th
- Play-off result: Semi-finals
- 2002 record: Wins: 9; draws: 3; losses: 12
- Points scored: For: 632; against: 546

Team information
- Coach: Andrew Farrar
- Captain: Trent Barrett
- Stadium: Sydney Football Stadium, Wollongong Showground
- Avg. attendance: 12,450
- High attendance: 20,588 (vs. Roosters, round 7)

Top scorers
- Tries: Lee Hookey (18)
- Points: Mark Riddell (129)
← 2001	2003 →

The 2002 St. George Illawarra Dragons season was the fourth in the joint venture club's history. The Dragons competed in the NRL's 2002 premiership season. The team finished seventh in the regular season, making finals but getting knocked out in the second week against the Cronulla-Sutherland Sharks, losing 40–24.

== Squad gains and losses ==
▲ or ▼	Player	2001 Club	2002 Club
▲	Leo Clarke	No club	St. George Illawarra Dragons
▲	Luke Felsch	Hull F.C. (Super League)	St. George Illawarra Dragons
▲	Shane Millard	London Broncos (Super League)	St. George Illawarra Dragons
▲	Nathan Tutt	Sydney Roosters	St. George Illawarra Dragons
▼	Jamie Ainscough	St. George Illawarra Dragons	Wigan Warriors (Super League)
▼	Wayne Bartrim	St. George Illawarra Dragons	Castleford Tigers (Super League)
▼	Jamie Fitzgerald	St. George Illawarra Dragons	South Sydney Rabbitohs
▼	Wade Forrester	St. George Illawarra Dragons	Northern Eagles
▼	Andrew Hart	St. George Illawarra Dragons	South Sydney Rabbitohs
▼	Ben Jeffries	St. George Illawarra Dragons	Wests Tigers
▼	Paul McGregor	St. George Illawarra Dragons	Retirement
▼	Craig Smith	St. George Illawarra Dragons	Wigan Warriors (Super League)
▼	Darren Treacy	St. George Illawarra Dragons	Salford City Reds (Super League)
▼	Colin Ward	St. George Illawarra Dragons	Penrith Panthers

== Ladder ==
2002 NRL season
Pos	Team	Pld	W	D	L	B	PF	PA	PD	Pts
1	New Zealand Warriors	24	17	0	7	2	688	454	+234	38
2	Newcastle Knights	24	17	0	7	2	724	498	+226	38
3	Brisbane Broncos	24	16	1	7	2	672	425	+247	37
4	Sydney Roosters (P)	24	15	1	8	2	621	405	+216	35
5	Cronulla-Sutherland Sharks	24	15	0	9	2	653	597	+56	34
6	Parramatta Eels	24	10	2	12	2	531	440	+91	26
7	St George Illawarra Dragons	24	9	3	12	2	632	546	+86	25
8	Canberra Raiders	24	10	1	13	2	471	641	-170	25
9	Northern Eagles	24	10	0	14	2	503	740	-237	24
10	Melbourne Storm	24	9	1	14	2	556	586	-30	23
11	North Queensland Cowboys	24	8	0	16	2	496	803	-307	20
12	Penrith Panthers	24	7	0	17	2	546	654	-108	18
13	Wests Tigers	24	7	0	17	2	498	642	-144	18
14	South Sydney Rabbitohs	24	5	0	19	2	385	817	-432	14
15	Canterbury-Bankstown Bulldogs	24	20	1	3	2	707	435	+272	8^{1}

^{1} The Bulldogs were deducted 37 premiership points due to gross salary cap breaches.

=== Ladder progression ===
Round	1	2	3	4	5	6	7	8	9	10	11	12	13	14	15	16	17	18	19	20	21	22	23	24	25	26
Ladder Position	11th	8th	12th	9th	9th	10th	12th	12th	11th	9th	8th	8th	10th	10th	11th	9th	9th	10th	10th	8th	9th	11th	9th	7th	8th	7th

== Season results ==
Round	Home	Score	Away	Match Information
Round	Home	Score	Away	Date	Venue	Referee	Attendance	Source
1	St. George Illawarra Dragons	18 – 24	Cronulla-Sutherland Sharks	17 March	Sydney Football Stadium	Paul Simpkins	12,470
2	Penrith Panthers	16 – 24	St. George Illawarra Dragons	24 March	Penrith Stadium	Tony Archer	10,207
3	Canterbury-Bankstown Bulldogs	33 – 14	St. George Illawarra Dragons	31 March	Stadium Australia	Bill Harrigan	37,183
4		BYE
5	St. George Illawarra Dragons	20 – 20	Parramatta Eels	14 April	Wollongong Showground	Tim Mander	16,321
6	Melbourne Storm	12 – 4	St. George Illawarra Dragons	20 April	Olympic Park Stadium	Sean Hampstead	8,023
7 (ANZAC Day)	St. George Illawarra Dragons	20 – 24	Sydney Roosters	25 April	Sydney Football Stadium	Tony Archer	20,588
8	Northern Eagles	22 – 18	St. George Illawarra Dragons	5 May	Brookvale Oval	Steve Clark	11,828
9	St. George Illawarra Dragons	21 – 21	Canberra Raiders	12 May	Wollongong Showground	Paul Simpkins	8,052
10	St. George Illawarra Dragons	33 – 22	Wests Tigers	18 May	Wollongong Showground	Shayne Hayne	10,823
11	St. George Illawarra Dragons	28 – 20	Brisbane Broncos	26 May	Sydney Football Stadium	Shayne Hayne	9,051
12	North Queensland Cowboys	40 – 32	St. George Illawarra Dragons	1 June	Willows Sports Complex	Matt Cecchin	10,561
13	Cronulla-Sutherland Sharks	34 – 13	St. George Illawarra Dragons	8 June	Endeavour Field	Shayne Hayne	12,554
14	St. George Illawarra Dragons	30 – 30	Melbourne Storm	15 June	Wollongong Showground	Sean Hampstead	8,021
15	New Zealand Warriors	22 – 32	St. George Illawarra Dragons	23 June	Mount Smart Stadium	Matt Cecchin	15,303
16	St. George Illawarra Dragons	45 – 18	North Queensland Cowboys	29 June	Wollongong Showground	Matt Cecchin	7,987
17	Brisbane Broncos	34 – 22	St. George Illawarra Dragons	7 July	Queensland Sport and Athletics Centre	Shayne Hayne	19,998
18	St. George Illawarra Dragons	26 – 28	Canterbury-Bankstown Bulldogs	14 July	Wollongong Showground	Paul Simpkins	18,048
19	South Sydney Rabbitohs	10 – 48	St. George Illawarra Dragons	20 July	Sydney Football Stadium	Shayne Hayne	15,219
20	Wests Tigers	8 – 42	St. George Illawarra Dragons	28 July	Campbelltown Stadium	Tim Mander	9,889
21	Newcastle Knights	24 – 16	St. George Illawarra Dragons	2 August	Newcastle International Sports Centre	Paul Simpkins	17,621
22	St. George Illawarra Dragons	18 – 20	Northern Eagles	11 August	Sydney Football Stadium	Tim Mander	9,621
23	St. George Illawarra Dragons	58 – 16	South Sydney Rabbitohs	18 August	Wollongong Showground	Matt Cecchin	12,122
24		BYE
25	Sydney Roosters	26 – 10	St. George Illawarra Dragons	1 September	Sydney Football Stadium	Bill Harrigan	15,629
26	St. George Illawarra Dragons	40 – 22	Newcastle Knights	8 September	Sydney Football Stadium	Paul Simpkins	16,297
FW1	Newcastle Knights	22 – 26	St. George Illawarra Dragons	14 September	Newcastle International Sports Centre	Bill Harrigan	21,051
FW2	Cronulla-Sutherland Sharks	40 – 24	St. George Illawarra Dragons	21 September	Sydney Football Stadium	Bill Harrigan	31,783
