= Scott McLean =

Scott McLean may refer to:

- Scott McLean (American football) (born 1960), linebacker (Dallas Cowboys)
- Scott McLean (footballer, born 1976), Scottish footballer (St. Johnstone, Inverness CT, Partick Thistle)
- Scott McLean (footballer, born 1997), Scottish footballer (Kilmarnock FC)
- Scott McLean (rugby league) (born 1981), Australian rugby league player
