= 2002 Cronulla-Sutherland Sharks season =

Australian rugby league club season

- NRL rank: 5th
- 2002 record: Wins: 16; draws: 0; losses: 11
- Points scored: For: 723 (132 tries, 97 goals, 1 field goal); against: 669 (115 tries, 104 goals, 1 field goal)

Team information
- Coach: Chris Anderson
- Captain: David Peachey Jason Stevens Chris Beattie Brett Kimmorley
- Stadium: Toyota Park
- Avg. attendance: 13,409

Top scorers
- Tries: David Peachey (17)
- Goals: Brett Kimmorley (97)
- Points: Brett Kimmorley (251)
← 2001	2003 →

The 2002 Cronulla-Sutherland Sharks season was the 36th in the club's history. They competed in the National Rugby League's 2002 Premiership.

== Season summary ==
In the off-season the Sharks signed former Melbourne Storm premiership-winning coach Chris Anderson, who also brought along with him the halfback involved in that premiership, Brett Kimmorley.

After a poor start to the season by the Sharks' standards, the Sharks set about with a record-equalling 11-game winning streak which did not crossover with the Bulldogs' famous 17-match run. The highlight of Cronulla's season was a huge 64–14 win over an injury-hit Newcastle Knights at home in round 22, exacting revenge after a 52–6 loss at Newcastle in round six (one of Cronulla's worst ever defeats). Eventually the Sharks finished 5th at the end of the premiership season and were drawn an away final against the Sydney Roosters at Aussie Stadium. Despite scoring five tries apiece, it was the goalkicking that proved the difference as the Roosters emerged victors 30-20 (Brett Kimmorley missed all five of his conversion attempts). The Sharks advanced further due to favourable results, which ultimately saw them pitted against rivals St. George Illawarra in the second round of the finals. The Sharks were seeking revenge after the Dragons denied them a place in the 1999 decider (which would have had them pitted against Anderson and Kimmorley's Melbourne Storm) and indeed the Sharks won 40–24. For the second year in succession, and the third in four years, the Sharks reached the penultimate weekend of the season, only to lose against the minor premiers New Zealand, ending another season in agony.

== Squad Movement ==
=== 2002 Gains ===
Player	Signed from
Phil Bailey	Northern Eagles
Matt Bickerstaff	Unknown
Greg Bird	Newcastle Knights
Dean Bosnich	Manly Sea Eagles
Paul Franze	Newcastle Knights
Matthew Johns	Wigan Warriors
Brett Kimmorley	Northern Eagles
Karl Lovell	Northern Eagles
Danny Nutley	Warrington Wolves
Brett O'Farrell	Melbourne Storm
Nick Paterson	North Queensland Cowboys
Matthew Rieck	Penrith Panthers
Brett Sargent	Parramatta Eels
Don Tweddle	Corrimal Cougars

=== 2002 Losses ===
Player	Signed from
Mark Capelin	Released
Matthew Daylight	Retired
Adam Dykes	Parramatta Eels
Shannon Donato	Penrith Panthers
Jason Ferris	Northern Eagles
Brent Grose	South Sydney Rabbitohs
Martin Lang	Penrith Panthers
Nathan Long	Northern Eagles
Paul McNicholas	South Sydney Rabbitohs
Damien Mostyn	South Sydney Rabbitohs
Scott Murray	Retired
Stuart Pierce	Retired
Mat Rogers	NSW Waratahs
Russell Richardson	South Sydney Rabbitohs
Sean Ryan	Hull FC
Ben Sammut	Retired
Blaine Stanley	South Sydney Rabbitohs
Luke Stuart	South Sydney Rabbitohs

== Ladder ==
2002 NRL season
Pos	Team	Pld	W	D	L	B	PF	PA	PD	Pts	Qualification
1	New Zealand Warriors	24	17	0	7	2	688	454	+234	38	Advance to finals series
2	Newcastle Knights	24	17	0	7	2	724	498	+226	38	Advance to finals series
3	Brisbane Broncos	24	16	1	7	2	672	425	+247	37	Advance to finals series
4	Sydney Roosters (P)	24	15	1	8	2	621	405	+216	35	Advance to finals series
5	Cronulla-Sutherland Sharks	24	15	0	9	2	653	597	+56	34	Advance to finals series
6	Parramatta Eels	24	10	2	12	2	531	440	+91	26	Advance to finals series
7	St. George Illawarra Dragons	24	9	3	12	2	632	546	+86	25	Advance to finals series
8	Canberra Raiders	24	10	1	13	2	471	641	−170	25	Advance to finals series
9	Northern Eagles	24	10	0	14	2	503	740	−237	24	
10	Melbourne Storm	24	9	1	14	2	556	586	−30	23	
11	North Queensland Cowboys	24	8	0	16	2	496	803	−307	20	
12	Penrith Panthers	24	7	0	17	2	546	654	−108	18	
13	Wests Tigers	24	7	0	17	2	498	642	−144	18	
14	South Sydney Rabbitohs	24	5	0	19	2	385	817	−432	14	
15	Canterbury-Bankstown Bulldogs	24	20	1	3	2	707	435	+272	8 (Note: The Bulldogs were deducted 37 premiership points due to gross salary cap breaches.)	

Source: National Rugby League RLP
Rules for classification: 1) competition points; 2) points differential
(P) Premiers
