= 2003 South Sydney Rabbitohs season =

- NRL rank: First Grade

Team information
- CEO: (Australia)
- Coach: (Australia) Paul Langmack
- Captain: (Australia) Bryan Fletcher
- Stadium: Aussie Stadium

Top scorers
- Tries: (Australia)
- Goals: (Australia)
- Points: (Australia)
← 2002	2004 →

The 2003 South Sydney Rabbitohs season was the 94th in the club's history. Coached by Paul Langmack and captained by Bryan Fletcher, Owen Craigie, Paul Stringer and Jason Death, they competed in the National Rugby League's 2003 Telstra Premiership, finishing the regular season 15th out of 15 teams, failing to reach the finals.

== Ladder ==
2003 NRL season
Pos	Team	Pld	W	D	L	B	PF	PA	PD	Pts
1	Penrith Panthers (P)	24	18	0	6	2	659	527	+132	40
2	Sydney Roosters	24	17	0	7	2	680	445	+235	38
3	Canterbury-Bankstown Bulldogs	24	16	0	8	2	702	419	+283	36
4	Canberra Raiders	24	16	0	8	2	620	463	+157	36
5	Melbourne Storm	24	15	0	9	2	564	486	+78	34
6	New Zealand Warriors	24	15	0	9	2	545	510	+35	34
7	Newcastle Knights	24	14	0	10	2	632	635	-3	32
8	Brisbane Broncos	24	12	0	12	2	497	464	+33	28
9	Parramatta Eels	24	11	0	13	2	570	582	-12	26
10	St George Illawarra Dragons	24	11	0	13	2	548	593	-45	26
11	North Queensland Cowboys	24	10	0	14	2	606	629	-23	24
12	Cronulla-Sutherland Sharks	24	8	0	16	2	497	704	-207	20
13	Wests Tigers	24	7	0	17	2	470	598	-128	18
14	Manly-Warringah Sea Eagles	24	7	0	17	2	557	791	-234	18
15	South Sydney Rabbitohs	24	3	0	21	2	457	758	-301	10

== Fixtures ==
=== Regular season ===
Round	Opponent	Result	Score	Date	Venue	Crowd	Ref
1	Sydney Roosters	Loss	23 – 34	Saturday 15 March	Stadium Australia	42,017	
2	Brisbane Broncos	Loss	20 – 22	Sunday 23 March	Aussie Stadium	9,830	
3	North Queensland Cowboys	Loss	20 – 27	31 March 2003	Aussie Stadium	9,422	
4	New Zealand Warriors	Loss	16 – 38	Sunday 6 April	Mt Smart	13,614	
5	Wests Tigers	Win	32 – 22	Saturday 12 April	Aussie Stadium	11,167	
6	Penrith Panthers	Loss	14 – 16	Saturday 19 April	Aussie Stadium	9,308	
7	Manly-Warringah Sea Eagles	Loss	20 – 28	Sunday 27 April	Brookvale Oval	8,178	
8	Canberra Raiders	Loss	1 – 34	Saturday 3 May	Aussie Stadium	9,736	
9	Newcastle Knights	Loss	28 – 42	Sunday 11 May	Newcastle International Sports Centre	14,268	
10	Cronulla Sutherland Sharks	Loss	14 – 30	Sunday 18 May	Endeavour Field	12,248	
11	St George Illawarra Dragons	Loss	16 – 18	Sunday 25 May	Sydney Cricket Ground	11,104	
12	Parramatta Eels	Loss	4 – 28	Saturday 31 May	Parramatta Stadium	10,179	
13	Melbourne Storm	Win	41 – 14	Sunday 8 June	Aussie Stadium	7,104	
14	BYE						
15	St George Illawarra Dragons	Loss	20 – 34	Saturday 21 June	WIN Stadium	10,220	
16	New Zealand Warriors	Loss	30 – 31	Sunday 29 June	Aussie Stadium	9,109	
17	Sydney Roosters	Loss	38 – 10	Saturday 5 July	Aussie Stadium	17,148	
18	Penrith Panthers	Loss	30 – 24	Saturday 12 July	Penrith Park	15,251	
19	Parramatta Eels	Loss	34 – 20	Sunday 20 July	Aussie Stadium	8,987	
20	Melbourne Storm	Loss	6 – 24	Saturday 26 July	Olympic Park	7,539	
21	Canterbury-Bankstown Bulldogs	Loss	62 – 12	Sunday 3 August	Aussie Stadium	8,482	
22	Wests Tigers	Win	18 – 16	Saturday 9 August	Leichhardt Oval	9,053	
23	Sydney Roosters	Loss	12 – 22	Sunday 17 August	Aussie Stadium	11,201	
24	North Queensland Cowboys	Loss	8 – 60	Saturday 23 August	Dairy Farmers Stadium	13,872	
25	Cronulla Sutherland Sharks	Loss	34 – 54	Saturday 30 August	Aussie Stadium	8,839	
26	BYE						
