= 2002 NRL Grand Final =

National Rugby League championship game

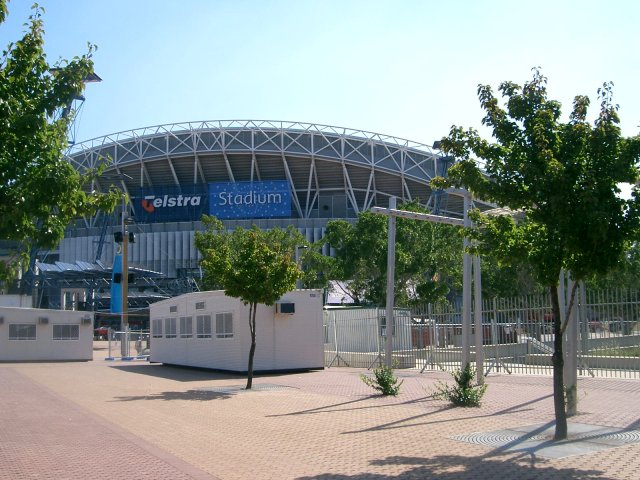
- Telstra Stadium, where the match was played

New Zealand Warriors	Sydney Roosters
8	30
	1	2	Total
NZL	2	6	8
SYD	6	24	30
- Date: 6 October 2002
- Stadium: Telstra Stadium
- Location: Sydney, NSW, Australia
- Clive Churchill Medal: Craig Fitzgibbon (SYD)
- Australian National anthem NZ National anthem: David Campbell; Jenny Morris
- Referee: Bill Harrigan
- Attendance: 80,130

Broadcast partners
- Broadcasters: Nine Network
- Commentators: Ken Sutcliffe (host); Ray Warren; Peter Sterling; Paul Vautin; Andrew Voss (sideline)

The 2002 NRL Grand Final was the conclusive and premiership-deciding game of the 2002 NRL season. It took place on Sunday, 6 October 2002, at Sydney's Telstra Stadium. 80,130 people saw the Sydney Roosters beat the New Zealand Warriors 30–8. The Clive Churchill Medalist was Craig Fitzgibbon of the Sydney Roosters. The match was also broadcast live in the United States by Fox Sports World.

== Background ==
The 2002 NRL season was the 95th season of professional rugby league football in Australia and the fifth to be run by the National Rugby League. Fifteen teams competed for the Minor premiership which, after the Bulldogs were relegated to the bottom of the ladder for salary cap breaches, was claimed by the New Zealand Warriors. The top eight finishing teams were then reduced to two over the finals series.

=== Sydney Roosters ===
The 2002 Sydney Roosters season was the 95th in the club's history. Coached by Ricky Stuart and captained by Brad Fittler, they finished the NRL's 2002 Premiership regular season in 4th place.

=== New Zealand Warriors ===
The 2002 New Zealand Warriors season was the 8th in the club's history. Coached by Daniel Anderson and captained by Stacey Jones and Kevin Campion, they finished the NRL's 2002 Premiership regular season in 1st place.

== Teams ==
It was the final game for Warriors fullback Ivan Cleary and Roosters winger Brett Mullins before their playing retirements.

Team details
New Zealand Warriors		Position	Sydney Roosters
Name	Number	Position	Number	Name
Ivan Cleary	1	Fullback	1	Luke Phillips
Justin Murphy	2	Wing	2	Brett Mullins
John Carlaw	3	Centre	3	Shannon Hegarty
Clinton Toopi	4	Centre	4	Justin Hodges
Francis Meli	5	Wing	5	Anthony Minichiello
Motu Tony	6	Five eighth	6	Brad Fittler (c)
Stacey Jones (c)	7	Half back	7	Craig Wing
Jerry Seu Seu	8	Prop forward	8	Jason Cayless
PJ Marsh	9	Hooker	9	Simon Bonetti
Mark Tookey	10	Prop forward	10	Peter Cusack
Ali Lauiti'iti	11	Second row	14	Adrian Morley
Awen Guttenbeil	12	Second row	12	Craig Fitzgibbon
Kevin Campion	13	Lock forward	13	Luke Ricketson
Lance Hohaia	14	Interchange	11	Bryan Fletcher
Richard Villasanti	15	Interchange	15	Andrew Lomu
Wairangi Koopu	16	Interchange	16	Chris Flannery
Logan Swann	17	Interchange	17	Michael Crocker
Daniel Anderson		Coach		Ricky Stuart
RLP

== Match details ==
Both teams entered the cauldron of Telstra Stadium with great form heading into the contest. The Warriors had won their 2 Finals matches they had had. In Week 1 they beat the Canberra Raiders 36–20 in Auckland, before beating the Cronulla-Sutherland Sharks 16–10 at Telstra Stadium. The Roosters had beaten the Sharks 32–20 at the Sydney Football Stadium, then beating the Newcastle Knights in Sydney. Finally they beat the Brisbane Broncos (whom the Roosters were beaten by in the 2000 decider) in Sydney again.

A pre-match performance by Billy Idol was attempted but due to a power outage had to be aborted.

=== 1st half ===
The opening minutes were spent with both teams trading blows, the Roosters mainly with the upper hand. However it took till the 23rd minute for the deadlock to be broken, the Roosters scoring through Shannon Hegarty. Craig Fitzgibbon converted the try and the Sydney Roosters led 6–0. Soon, the Warriors found their rhythm and Ivan Cleary got a penalty goal to make the score 6–2 to the Roosters. It remained that way to half time, the Sydney Roosters holding the upper hand over the New Zealand Warriors.

=== 2nd half ===
The second half started rather differently. Within 6 minutes the New Zealand Warriors took the lead. Stacey Jones darted over and the Warriors had the lead when Ivan Cleary converted from in front for a 6–8 score to the New Zealand Warriors. As the game approached its final quarter, a brilliant 40–20 from Roosters five-eighth and captain Brad Fittler saw the Roosters outfit on the front foot again. Craig Wing crashed over, Craig Fitzgibbon converted and the Roosters had a 12–8 lead. It looked as though it was going to be a tense finish but tries to Fitzgibbon, Chris Flannery and Bryan Fletcher as well as 3 conversions from Fitzgibbon meant the Sydney Roosters ran out 30–8 victors over the New Zealand Warriors. The grand final victory ended a 27-year premiership drought at the club.

== Match summary ==
2002 NRL Grand Final

Sunday, 6 October
19:00 AEST (UTC+10)

New Zealand Warriors	8 – 30	Sydney Roosters
Tries: 1 Jones 46'; Goals: 2 Cleary pen 29', 47' (2/2)	1st: 2–6; 2nd: 6–24; Report	Tries: 5 Hegarty 23'; Wing 57'; Fitzgibbon 65'; Flannery 71'; Fletcher 74'; Goals: 5 Fitzgibbon 25', 59', 66', 71', 76' (5/5)

Telstra Stadium, Sydney
Attendance: 80,130
Referee: Bill Harrigan
Touch judges: Steve Richards, Shayne Hayne
Clive Churchill Medal: Craig Fitzgibbon (Sydney)

== World Club Challenge ==
The Sydney Roosters' victory in the Grand Final meant that they gained the right to travel to England and play in the World Club Challenge against the winners of the 2002 Super League grand final winners, St. Helens.
