= 2002 Bulldogs RLFC season =

← 2001	2003 →

The 2002 Bulldogs RLFC season was the 68th in the club's history. Coached by Steve Folkes and captained by Steve Price, they competed in the National Rugby League's 2002 Telstra Premiership, finishing the regular season at the bottom of the ladder due to punishment for breaches of the NRL's strictly-enforced salary cap. The discovery of these breaches resulted in then-unprecedented penalties being inflicted upon the Sydney-based club, none more so than the 37 competition points gained from the 2002 season docked from them and the demotion of the club from first to last place with three rounds remaining in the season. In addition to those penalties, the club was fined a then-record $500,000. The League's top try scorer for the season was Nigel Vagana with 23 and the top points scorer was Hazem El Masri with 254 - both Bulldogs players.

== Salary cap breach ==
The Bulldogs fallout from a disappointing 2000 season saw a "new breed" of players coming through for 2001. The Bulldogs' outfit aged badly in 2000 with many players in decline, however several new players on the way, including Nigel Vagana, Luke Patten, Brett Howland and Darrell Trindall were making an impact. The Bulldogs finished the Minor Premiership in second position but were eliminated in the Finals. The Dally M Rookie of the Year that season was Braith Anasta. Mark O'Meley was signed up for the 2002 season as the club said farewell to captain Darren Britt and his deputy Craig Polla-Mounter. With both of those gone, Steve Folkes opted for Steve Price as captain ahead of the more experienced Darren Smith.

In mid-2002, the Bulldogs were found guilty of serious and systemic breaches of the salary cap. NRL Chief Executive David Gallop described the violation as "exceptional in both its size and its deliberate and ongoing nature". The club received the maximum fine of $500,000, and was stripped of all 37 competition points. The latter action was particularly harmful, as the club were poised to take the Minor Premiership and had won 17 consecutive matches (the second highest in Australian club rugby league history at the time); the penalty meant that the club would win the wooden spoon. Fans of the club had gone from the joy of a last-minute win over Newcastle just two weeks prior to the pain, anguish and realisation that the club would not be participating in the 2002 finals.

The stripping of the Bulldogs' points also enabled the Canberra Raiders to make the finals with a points differential of -170, the poorest such record of any finalist in the competition's history, and despite the fact that the Raiders only won one game outside of Canberra for the entire season. It also enabled the New Zealand Warriors to secure their first minor premiership in the club's history.

Club legend Steve Mortimer was brought in to save the club, and the Bulldogs then finished one game short of the Grand Final in 2003.

== Ladder ==
The Warriors received A$100,000 prize money for finishing the regular season as minor premiers.

2002 NRL season
Pos	Team	Pld	W	D	L	B	PF	PA	PD	Pts	Qualification
1	New Zealand Warriors	24	17	0	7	2	688	454	+234	38	Advance to finals series
2	Newcastle Knights	24	17	0	7	2	724	498	+226	38	Advance to finals series
3	Brisbane Broncos	24	16	1	7	2	672	425	+247	37	Advance to finals series
4	Sydney Roosters (P)	24	15	1	8	2	621	405	+216	35	Advance to finals series
5	Cronulla-Sutherland Sharks	24	15	0	9	2	653	597	+56	34	Advance to finals series
6	Parramatta Eels	24	10	2	12	2	531	440	+91	26	Advance to finals series
7	St. George Illawarra Dragons	24	9	3	12	2	632	546	+86	25	Advance to finals series
8	Canberra Raiders	24	10	1	13	2	471	641	−170	25	Advance to finals series
9	Northern Eagles	24	10	0	14	2	503	740	−237	24	
10	Melbourne Storm	24	9	1	14	2	556	586	−30	23	
11	North Queensland Cowboys	24	8	0	16	2	496	803	−307	20	
12	Penrith Panthers	24	7	0	17	2	546	654	−108	18	
13	Wests Tigers	24	7	0	17	2	498	642	−144	18	
14	South Sydney Rabbitohs	24	5	0	19	2	385	817	−432	14	
15	Canterbury-Bankstown Bulldogs	24	20	1	3	2	707	435	+272	8 (Note: The Bulldogs were deducted 37 premiership points due to gross salary cap breaches.)	

Source: National Rugby League RLP
Rules for classification: 1) competition points; 2) points differential
(P) Premiers

== See also ==
- History of the Canterbury-Bankstown Bulldogs
- List of Canterbury-Bankstown Bulldogs seasons
