= Ben Kusto =

Australian rugby league footballer

Personal information
- Full name: Ben Kusto
- Born: 23 February 1976 (age 50)

Playing information
- Position: Halfback
Club
Years	Team	Pld	T	G	FG	P
1996–98	St. George Dragons	22	2	3	0	14
1999–00	Parramatta Eels	30	7	0	2	30
2000–01	Huddersfield Giants	29	11	0	1	45
2002	Parramatta Eels	6	1	0	0	4
	Total	87	21	3	3	93

Ben Kusto (born 23 February 1976) is an Australian former professional rugby league footballer who played in the 1990s and 2000s.

== Playing career ==
Kusto started his career off with St. George where he played for 3 seasons before moving to Parramatta. Kusto played in St. George's final game before they formed a joint venture with the Illawarra Steelers to become St. George Illawarra. A semi-final loss to Canterbury-Bankstown at Kogarah Oval.

Kusto spent two seasons at Parramatta and was part of the 2000 Parramatta side which the media dubbed "The Baby Eels". Kusto left Parramatta at the end of the 2000 NRL season to join English side Huddersfield.

Kusto was part of the Huddersfield side which were relegated from the Super League. Kusto then signed a contract to rejoin Parramatta. At the end of the 2002 NRL season, Kusto was released by the club.
