= 2002 Brisbane Broncos season =

Coordinates: 27.558333°S 153.062222°E

← 2001	2003 →

The 2002 Brisbane Broncos season was the fifteenth in the club's history. They competed in the NRL's 2002 Telstra Premiership and finished the regular season in third position before going on to again come within one match of the grand final for the second consecutive year.

== Season summary ==
The 2002 NRL season saw the return of club legend Allan Langer to the Brisbane Broncos, following his successful comeback to Australian rugby league in the previous year's State of Origin decider. In 2002 he was the NRL's oldest player at 36 years and 60 days.

2002 was also the beginning of Brisbane's recurring "post origin slump", which was to haunt the club for the next four years. As most of the Queensland Maroons who compete in the mid-week State of Origin matches are Broncos' players, this extra workload often results in a loss of form for the club around and after the time of the Origin series. The Broncos finished the regular season in 3rd position, with the second-highest points differential in the league, but were knocked out in the Preliminary Final by the eventual premiers, the Sydney Roosters, in a rematch of the 2000 Grand Final.

One season highlight was the week 12 upset of Wests Tigers. Despite finishing the season down the ladder the Tigers were in a finals spot at the time. With nine players selected for Origin, Brisbane played six debutants, including Corey Parker, Scott Prince and Shaun Berrigan, ultimately defeating the Tigers 28–14.

== Match results ==
Round	Opponent	Result	Bro.	Opp.	Date	Venue	Crowd	Position
1	North Queensland Cowboys	Win	42	6	16 Mar	Dairy Farmers Stadium	24,212	2/15
2	Canterbury Bulldogs	Draw	20	20	22 Mar	ANZ Stadium	22,300	5/15
3	Sydney Roosters	Win	22	8	29 Mar	Sydney Football Stadium	15,614	3/15
4	Cronulla Sharks	Win	18	16	7 Apr	ANZ Stadium	22,005	2/15
5	Canberra Raiders	Win	18	16	13 Apr	Bruce Stadium	12,029	2/15
6	Penrith Panthers	Win	30	26	21 Apr	ANZ Stadium	13,613	2/15
7	Newcastle Knights	Win	18	12	26 Apr	ANZ Stadium	37,166	1/15
8	South Sydney Rabbitohs	Win	42	16	3 May	Sydney Football Stadium	14,874	1/15
9	Northern Eagles	Win	50	12	11 May	ANZ Stadium	14,202	1/15
10	BYE							1/15
11*	St George Illawarra Dragons	Loss	20	28	26 May	Sydney Football Stadium	9,051	2/15
12	Wests Tigers	Win	28	14	31 May	Campbelltown Stadium	9,540	2/15
13*	Parramatta Eels	Loss	18	22	7 Jun	ANZ Stadium	17,667	4/15
14	North Queensland Cowboys	Win	52	8	16 Jun	ANZ Stadium	10,215	4/15
15	BYE							2/15
16*	New Zealand Warriors	Loss	16	26	30 Jun	ANZ Stadium	24,907	4/15
17	St George Illawarra Dragons	Win	34	22	7 Jul	ANZ Stadium	19,998	3/15
18	Penrith Panthers	Win	38	20	13 Jul	Penrith Football Stadium	10,099	2/15
19	Wests Tigers	Win	46	14	20 Jul	ANZ Stadium	13,009	2/15
20	Parramatta Eels	Win	26	6	26 Jul	Parramatta Stadium	15,525	2/15
21	Melbourne Storm	Win	48	20	3 Aug	Olympic Park Stadium	10,308	2/15
22	Sydney Roosters	Loss	18	28	9 Aug	ANZ Stadium	23,991	2/15
23	New Zealand Warriors	Loss	4	18	18 Aug	Mt Smart Stadium	22,125	3/15
24	Newcastle Knights	Loss	10	40	23 Aug	EnergyAustralia Stadium	18,601	3/15
25	Canberra Raiders	Win	36	2	31 Aug	ANZ Stadium	22,502	2/15
26	Canterbury Bulldogs	Loss	18	25	6 Sep	Sydney Showground Stadium	16,492	3/15
Qualif. Final	Parramatta Eels	Win	24	14	14 Sep	ANZ Stadium	19,115	
Prelim. Final	Sydney Roosters	Loss	12	16	28 Sep	Sydney Football Stadium	28,251	

*Game following a State of Origin match

== Ladder ==
2002 NRL season
Pos	Team	Pld	W	D	L	B	PF	PA	PD	Pts	Qualification
1	New Zealand Warriors	24	17	0	7	2	688	454	+234	38	Advance to finals series
2	Newcastle Knights	24	17	0	7	2	724	498	+226	38	Advance to finals series
3	Brisbane Broncos	24	16	1	7	2	672	425	+247	37	Advance to finals series
4	Sydney Roosters (P)	24	15	1	8	2	621	405	+216	35	Advance to finals series
5	Cronulla-Sutherland Sharks	24	15	0	9	2	653	597	+56	34	Advance to finals series
6	Parramatta Eels	24	10	2	12	2	531	440	+91	26	Advance to finals series
7	St. George Illawarra Dragons	24	9	3	12	2	632	546	+86	25	Advance to finals series
8	Canberra Raiders	24	10	1	13	2	471	641	−170	25	Advance to finals series
9	Northern Eagles	24	10	0	14	2	503	740	−237	24	
10	Melbourne Storm	24	9	1	14	2	556	586	−30	23	
11	North Queensland Cowboys	24	8	0	16	2	496	803	−307	20	
12	Penrith Panthers	24	7	0	17	2	546	654	−108	18	
13	Wests Tigers	24	7	0	17	2	498	642	−144	18	
14	South Sydney Rabbitohs	24	5	0	19	2	385	817	−432	14	
15	Canterbury-Bankstown Bulldogs	24	20	1	3	2	707	435	+272	8 (Note: The Bulldogs were deducted 37 premiership points due to gross salary cap breaches.)	

Source: National Rugby League RLP
Rules for classification: 1) competition points; 2) points differential
(P) Premiers

== Scorers ==
Player	Tries	Goals	FG	Points
Michael De Vere	6	81/102	0	186
Lote Tuqiri	15	17/25	0	94
Darren Lockyer	15	1/1	0	62
Chris Walker	15	0	0	60
Shaun Berrigan	10	0	0	40
Brent Tate	10	0	0	40
Gorden Tallis	10	0	0	40
Casey McGuire	7	0	0	28
Carl Webb	7	0	0	28
Allan Langer	5	0	0	20
Steve Irwin	4	0	0	16
Stuart Kelly	4	0	0	16
Brad Meyers	3	0	0	12
Scott Prince	0	5/6	0	10
Andrew Gee	2	0	0	8
Phillip Lee	2	0	0	8
Corey Parker	2	0	0	8
Brett Seymour	2	0	0	8
Shane Webcke	2	0	0	8
Petero Civoniceva	1	0	0	4
Dane Carlaw	1	0	0	4
Ashley Harrison	1	0	0	4
Robert Tanielu	1	0	0	4

== Honours ==
=== League ===
- Nil

=== Club ===
- Player of the year: Darren Lockyer
- Rookie of the year: Brent Tate
- Back of the year: Darren Lockyer
- Forward of the year: Shane Webcke
- Club man of the year: Scott Prince
