= Awen Guttenbeil =

NZ & Tonga international rugby league footballer

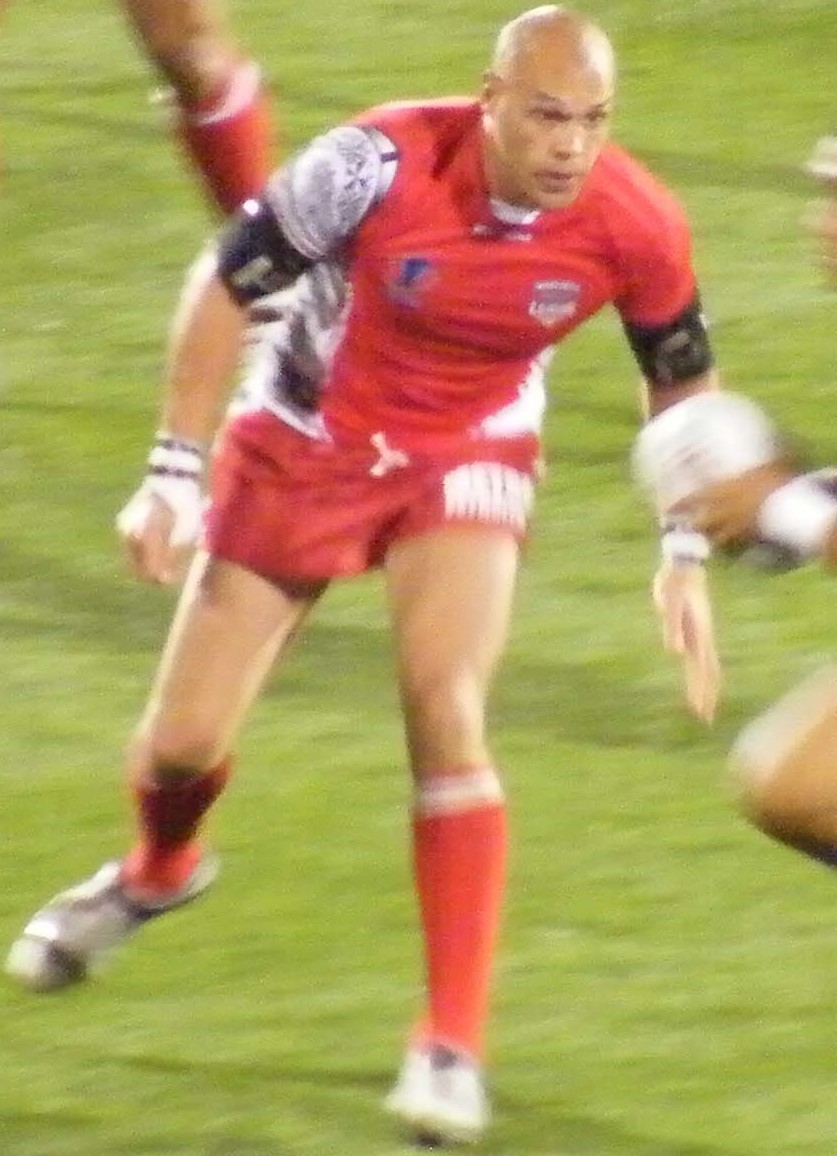

Personal information
- Full name: Awen John Guttenbeil
- Born: 14 March 1976 (age 50) Whangarei, New Zealand

Playing information
- Height: 188 cm (6 ft 2 in)
- Weight: 101 kg (15 st 13 lb)
- Position: Second-row, Prop
Club
Years	Team	Pld	T	G	FG	P
1996–06	New Zealand Warriors	170	15	0	0	60
2007–08	Castleford Tigers	43	8	0	0	32
	Total	213	23	0	0	92
Representative
Years	Team	Pld	T	G	FG	P
1995–08	Tonga	3	2	0	0	8
2002–05	New Zealand	10	0	0	0	0

Awen Guttenbeil (born 14 March 1976) is a former professional rugby league footballer who played in the 1990s and 2000s. Since retiring after a playing career spanning fifteen years, he went on to work as a broadcaster for Sky Network Television and as a presenter on Māori Television sports show, Hyundai Code. In 2010 he coached his schoolboy club Point Chevalier Pirates in the Auckland Rugby League's Phelan Shield alongside former team mate and childhood friend Stacey Jones. He represented both the Tongan and New Zealand national sides in his long career and played in two World Cups. His position of preference was in the Second-Row. He was an integral part of the 2002 New Zealand Warriors squad, noted for being the first team in the club's history to make the NRL Grand Final. He now owns and operates several construction businesses in New Zealand including Passive Fire NZ.

== Background ==
Guttenbeil was born in Whangarei, New Zealand on 14 March 1976. He started playing rugby league football for the Portland Panthers at age 3 in Northland before moving to Auckland and playing for the Point Chevalier Pirates alongside future Warriors teammate, Stacey Jones. Guttenbeil was chased by several professional clubs after an Auckland Development Tour of Australia in 1993 and ended up moving to Sydney at the age of 17 to sign for the Manly-Warringah Sea Eagles under the then Australian coach, Bob Fulton. In 1995, Guttenbeil made his international debut, playing for Tonga in the 1995 World Cup.

== Playing career ==
=== Warriors ===
Guttenbeil was set to star for Manly but his decision to sign with the yet to be formed Super League competition saw him out of favour with the club and so he returned to New Zealand to play for the Auckland Warriors in 1996. Guttenbeil made his first grade début in round four of the 1996 ARL season. He also switched his international allegiance to New Zealand and was in line to play for the Kiwis in 1996 but injury ruled him out of his Kiwis début that year. In his early years he was plagued by injury.

Awen played for Tonga at the 1995 Rugby League World Cup .

It was not until 2002 that Guttenbeil finally played in his first Test match for New Zealand. Guttenbeil played at second-row forward in the Warriors' 2002 NRL Grand Final loss to the Sydney Roosters. He went on to become one of the longest serving Warriors, playing eleven seasons with the club and became the second player to ever receive a testimonial from the club, the first being Stacey Jones. Guttenbeil was also the only player in the club's history to have a playing jersey designed for him. He went on to play in ten Test matches for the Kiwis, playing his last in 2005.

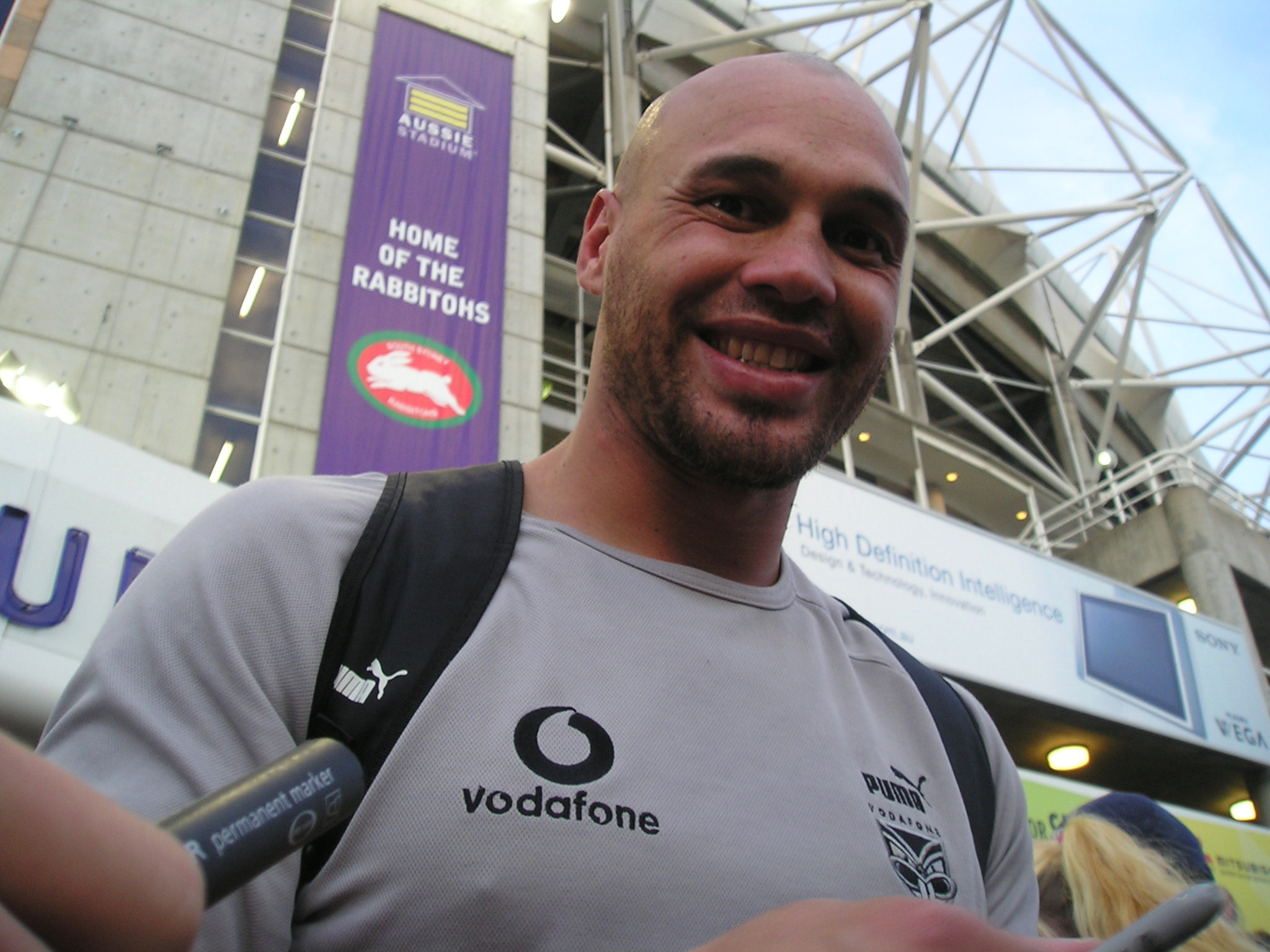
Guttenbeil in 2008

=== Castleford ===
Guttenbeil signed with the Castleford Tigers for the 2006 season, expecting to play in the Super League. However Castleford Tigers were relegated, leaving doubts about Guttenbeils future. He decided to uphold his contract and help the Tigers seek promotion. He moved to England to join the club as a player and assistant coach to Terry Matterson Guttenbeil played in the National League One Grand Final in 2007 and scored 2 tries to help promote Castleford back to the Super League. In 2008 he was named one of the clubs co-captains, alongside Brent Sherwin. Guttenbeil decided to retire after the 2008 season. In 2008 Guttenbeil again played for Tonga, competing in the 2008 World Cup where he captained the squad in the game against New Zealand.

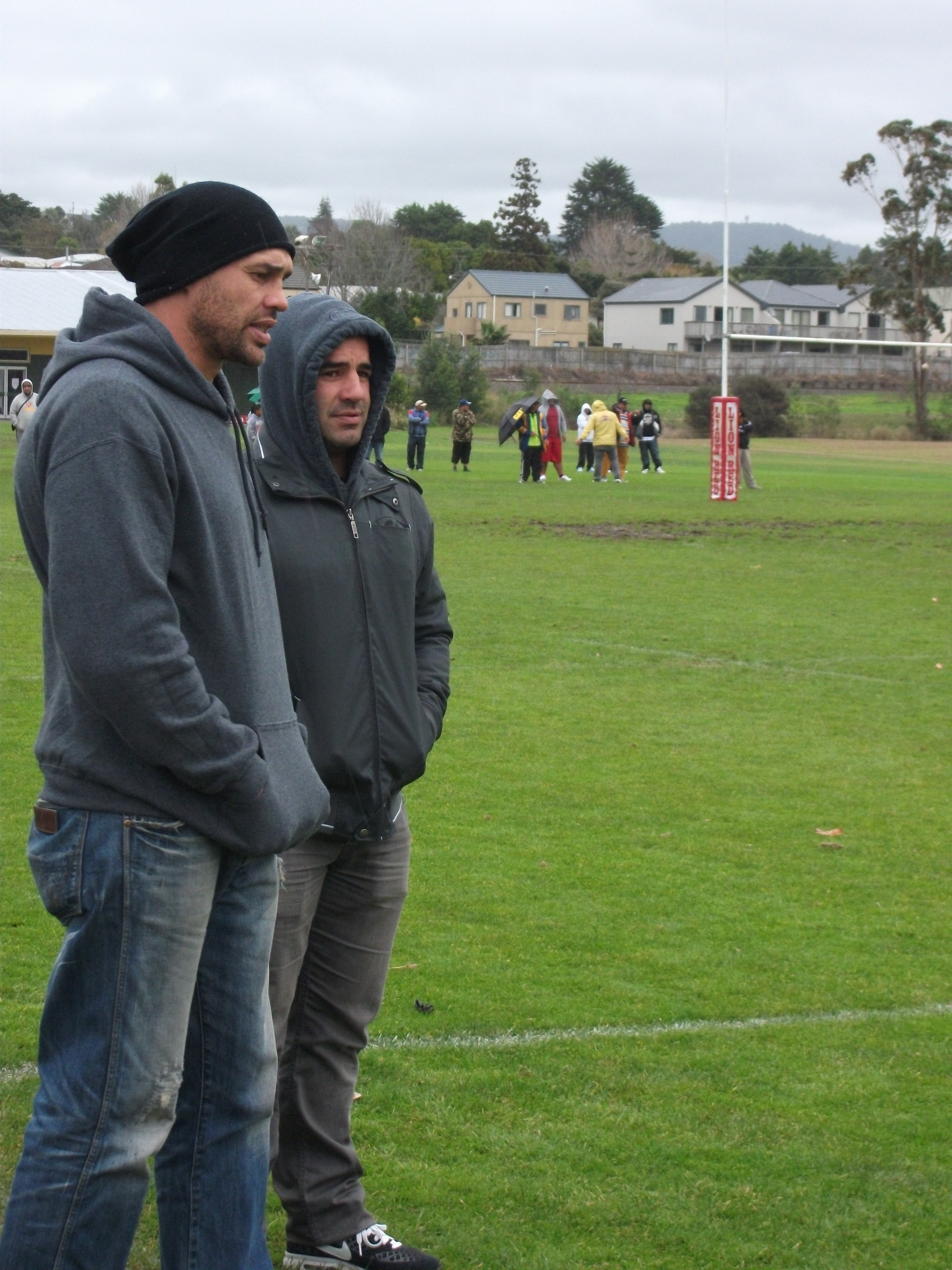
Guttenbeil and Stacey Jones coaching the Point Chev Pirates in 2010.

== Post playing ==
Guttenbeil worked as a broadcaster for SKY Network Television from 2009 to 2014 and for Maori Television's sports show, Code from 2009 to 2013. He hosts live links at NRL games, and various in studio pieces including hosting the NRL commentary show 'The After Match'. In 2014 Guttenbeil moved out of broadcasting to focus on running several construction companies in New Zealand, focusing on construction and passive fire work in the Auckland area.

In 2010 he coached the Point Chevalier Pirates alongside Stacey Jones.

=== Charity Work ===
Guttenbeil has been an ambassador for White Ribbon New Zealand since 2010. White Ribbon is campaign led by men who condemn violence against women and take action.

=== Identity Theft ===
In 2010 a prankster posing as Wairangi Koopu led to news articles claiming that Guttenbeil was joining the AMNRL.

=== Fight For Life 2011 ===
Guttenbeil was named in the line up for the 2011 Charity Boxing match Fight for Life which pits retired and current rugby league players against players from the rugby union code. The match will be held in Auckland on 3 December at The Trusts Stadium with proceeds going to the Prostate Cancer Foundation of New Zealand.
