= 2002 Parramatta Eels season =

Australia Rugby League Parramatta Eels 2002 season

- NRL Rank: 6th
- Play-off result: Qualifying Finalists (Lost 14–24 vs Brisbane Broncos, 2nd Qualifying Final)
- World Club Challenge: DNQ
- 2002 record: Wins: 10; draws: 2; losses: 12
- Points scored: For: 531; against: 440

Team information
- CEO: Denis Fitzgerald
- Coach: (Australia) Brian Smith
- Captain: (New Zealand) Nathan Cayless
- Stadium: Parramatta Stadium (Capacity: 20,741)
- Avg. attendance: 14,088 (Home); 14,762 (Home & Away); 19,115 (Finals Series)
- Agg. attendance: 169,062 (Home); 342,842 (Home & Away); 19,115 (Finals Series)
- High attendance: 22,136 (28 March vs Bulldogs RLFC, Round 16)

Top scorers
- Tries: (Australia) Luke Burt (10)
- Goals: (Australia) Luke Burt (42)
- Points: (Australia) Luke Burt (114)
← 2001	List of seasons	2003 →

The 2002 Parramatta Eels season was the 56th in the club's history. Coached by Brian Smith and captained by Nathan Cayless, they competed in the National Rugby League's 2002 Telstra Premiership.

== Summary ==
Parramatta started the 2002 season with a 64-6 victory over Penrith at Parramatta Stadium. The club would win seven of their first ten games to sit fourth on the competition ladder. However, towards the back end of the year the club would lose six games in a row. The 2002 season ended with Parramatta finishing in sixth place. The side lost in the first week of the finals 24–14 to the Brisbane Broncos at what was then known as Telstra Stadium. However, this loss resulted in the elimination of the club from the 2002 Finals Series as seventh place St. George Illawarra upset the defending premiers, Newcastle.

== Standings ==
2002 NRL season
Pos	Team	Pld	W	D	L	B	PF	PA	PD	Pts
1	New Zealand Warriors	24	17	0	7	2	688	454	+234	38
2	Newcastle Knights	24	17	0	7	2	724	498	+226	38
3	Brisbane Broncos	24	16	1	7	2	672	425	+247	37
4	Sydney Roosters (P)	24	15	1	8	2	621	405	+216	35
5	Cronulla-Sutherland Sharks	24	15	0	9	2	653	597	+56	34
6	Parramatta Eels	24	10	2	12	2	531	440	+91	26
7	St George Illawarra Dragons	24	9	3	12	2	632	546	+86	25
8	Canberra Raiders	24	10	1	13	2	471	641	-170	25
9	Northern Eagles	24	10	0	14	2	503	740	-237	24
10	Melbourne Storm	24	9	1	14	2	556	586	-30	23
11	North Queensland Cowboys	24	8	0	16	2	496	803	-307	20
12	Penrith Panthers	24	7	0	17	2	546	654	-108	18
13	Wests Tigers	24	7	0	17	2	498	642	-144	18
14	South Sydney Rabbitohs	24	5	0	19	2	385	817	-432	14
15	Canterbury-Bankstown Bulldogs	24	20	1	3	2	707	435	+272	8^{1}

^{1} The Bulldogs were deducted 37 premiership points due to gross salary cap breaches.

== Awards ==
- Michael Cronin clubman of the year award: Andrew Ryan
- Ken Thornett Medal (Players' player): Nathan Hindmarsh
- Jack Gibson Award (Coach's award): Luke Burt
- Eric Grothe Rookie of the Year Award: Ashley Graham
