= Mick Watson =

Australian businessman, and rugby league administrator

Mick Watson (born 1966 in Sydney) is an Australian businessman and former director of sports at Rangitoto College.

== Early life ==
Watson attended Marist Brothers Parramatta in Sydney's western suburbs, representing the school in cricket, rugby league, athletics and swimming.

He spent 12 years working in the 'Cola Wars'. From 1986 to 1992, he worked for Coca-Cola, moving through the ranks of marketing and sales. From 1992 to 1998 he was with Pepsi Cola, working with athletes, creating sports sponsorship and was also responsible for sports and event marketing.

He joined Kellogg's in 1998. He was responsible for re-engineering sports properties and helping Kellogg's deliver their business plan for the first time in 19 years.

== New Zealand Warriors ==
In November 2000, Watson was appointed chief executive officer of the New Zealand Warriors, shortly after chairman Eric Watson purchased the New Zealand licence to compete in the National Rugby League. He was involved with the club when they made the finals series of the NRL for 3 consecutive years (2001, 2002 and 2003). Under his leadership the club secured its first title, winning the J.J. Giltinan Shield for the minor premiership in 2002. The same year the Warriors made its NRL Grand Final for the first time.

Watson resigned from the Warriors at the end of the 2005 season. Warriors' majority shareholder Eric Watson said Watson had played a huge role in rebuilding the club. "When we had problems in 2004, Mick had to remove himself from Cullen Sports projects and come back into the rugby league business," he said. During Watson's time at the Warriors, the club reached the NRL finals for the first time in their history (2001), repeated the feat the next two seasons and, in 2002, also won the minor premiership and made the grand final for the first time but in the past two years he has fallen out with leading media outlets for periods.

== Boxing ==
Watson created the Cullen Sports boxing division which includes New Zealand Heavyweight Shane Cameron (former IBF Australasian, IBF Pan Pacific).

In 2007, Watson and former Rugby League star Monty Betham formed WAAAM Boxing and created Dodge Fight Night. A professional Boxing event that was broadcast live on TVNZ in New Zealand and delayed to Australia and Samoa. WAAAM Boxing promoted Anthony Mundine, Steven Heremia, Tyrone Brunson, Peter Kariuki and Mohammed Azzaiouii.

== Other work ==
During his tenure as CEO Cullen Sports, Watson wrote and created Prime's first NZ produced product – The Tem Show, starring Temuera Morrison. Watson was appointed ambassador for Auckland Cancer Society in 2001 and 2002.
