= Wairangi Koopu =

New Zealand international rugby league footballer

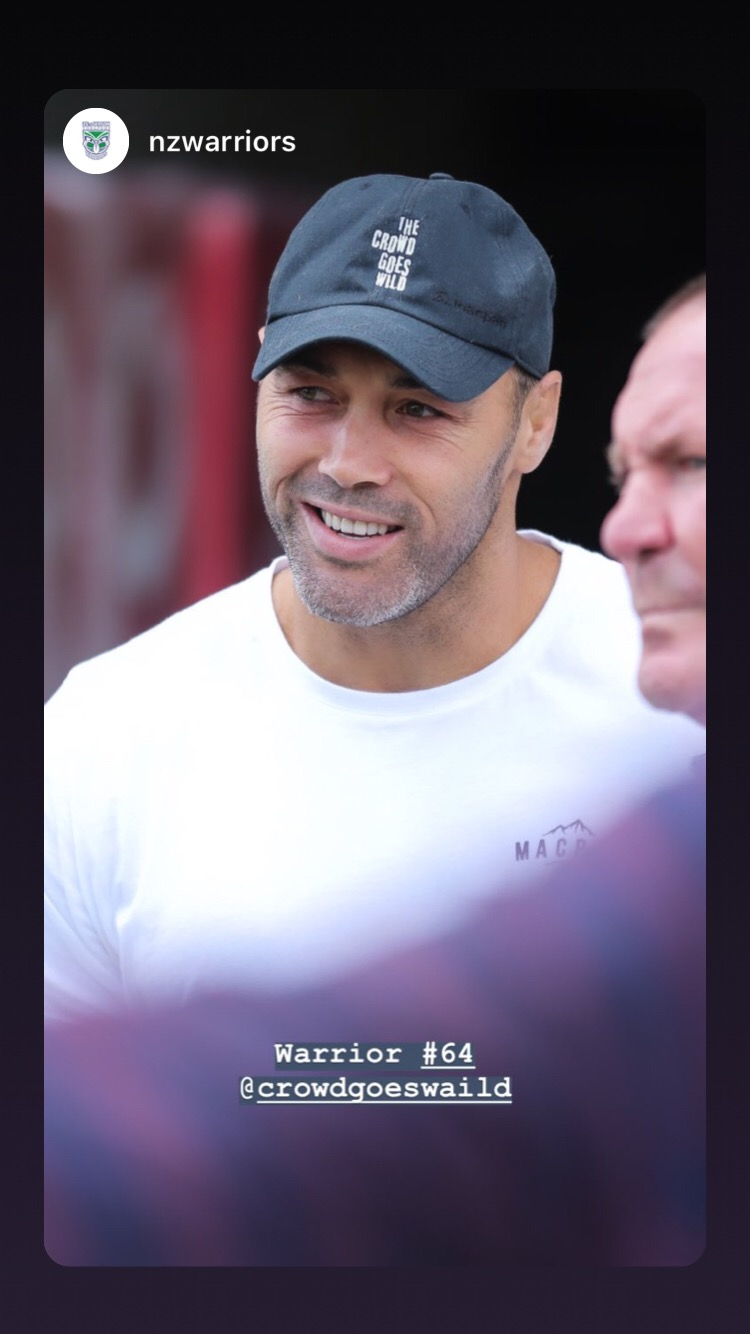

Personal information
- Full name: Dane Wairangi Manuera Koopu
- Born: 2 April 1980 (age 46) Ōpōtiki, Bay of Plenty, New Zealand
- Height: 185 cm (6 ft 1 in)
- Weight: 99 kg (15 st 8 lb)

Playing information
- Position: Second-row
Club
Years	Team	Pld	T	G	FG	P
1999–08	New Zealand Warriors	159	34	0	0	136
2009	Melbourne Storm	12	1	0	0	4
	Total	171	35	0	0	140
Representative
Years	Team	Pld	T	G	FG	P
2000–08	New Zealand Māori	4	1	0	0	4
2004–05	New Zealand	3	0	0	0	0
- Source: As of 20 March 2021

Dane Wairangi Manuera Koopu (born 2 April 1980) is a New Zealand former professional rugby league footballer who played for the New Zealand Warriors and the Melbourne Storm in the National Rugby League. Koopu primarily played in the second-row, and as a centre. He is fluent in Te Reo Maori and often appeared on Māori Television.

== Background ==
Koopu was born in Ōpōtiki, New Zealand, on 2 April 1980. He is of Te Whānau-ā-Apanui and Ngāti Awa iwi.

== Playing career ==
Koopu started playing rugby league for the Taniwharau Rugby League club in Huntly, where he attended school at Te Wharekura o Rakaumanga. In 1998 he also represented the Waikato Cougars, played for the Junior Kiwis and was named in the National Māori tournament team after representing Waikato Māori. During the early part of 1999, Koopu played for the Glenora Bears and represented Auckland North. While contracted to the Warriors, Koopu also played in the then feeder clubs for the NRL franchise, the Wynnum Manly Seagulls and the Newtown Jets. Koopu also represented the NZ Maori at the 2000 RLWC and played for the Kiwi's 3 times.

=== Warriors ===
Koopu made his first grade debut for the Auckland Warriors in Round 6, 1999. He went on to play for the club 159 times, earning the nickname "Mr Consistency". Koopu played for the New Zealand Māori in 1999 and at the 2000 Rugby League World Cup.

Koopu played for the New Zealand Warriors from the interchange bench in their 2002 NRL Grand Final loss to the Sydney Roosters. It was not until 2004 that he made his debut for the New Zealand national rugby league team. Koopu seriously injured his shoulder in 2006 and never fully regained his consistency with the Warriors. As a result, after ten years with the Warriors, Koopu was released by the club at the end of the 2008 season. That year Koopu again played for the New Zealand Māori in two games, including a match against an Indigenous Dreamtime side.

=== Melbourne ===
After being released by the Warriors, Koopu accepted a one-year contract with the Melbourne Storm for the 2009 season. Koopu was named as reserve for the Storm team that won the 2009 NRL Grand Final, a premiership that was later stripped after their long-term salary cap breaches came to light in 2010.

== Later years ==
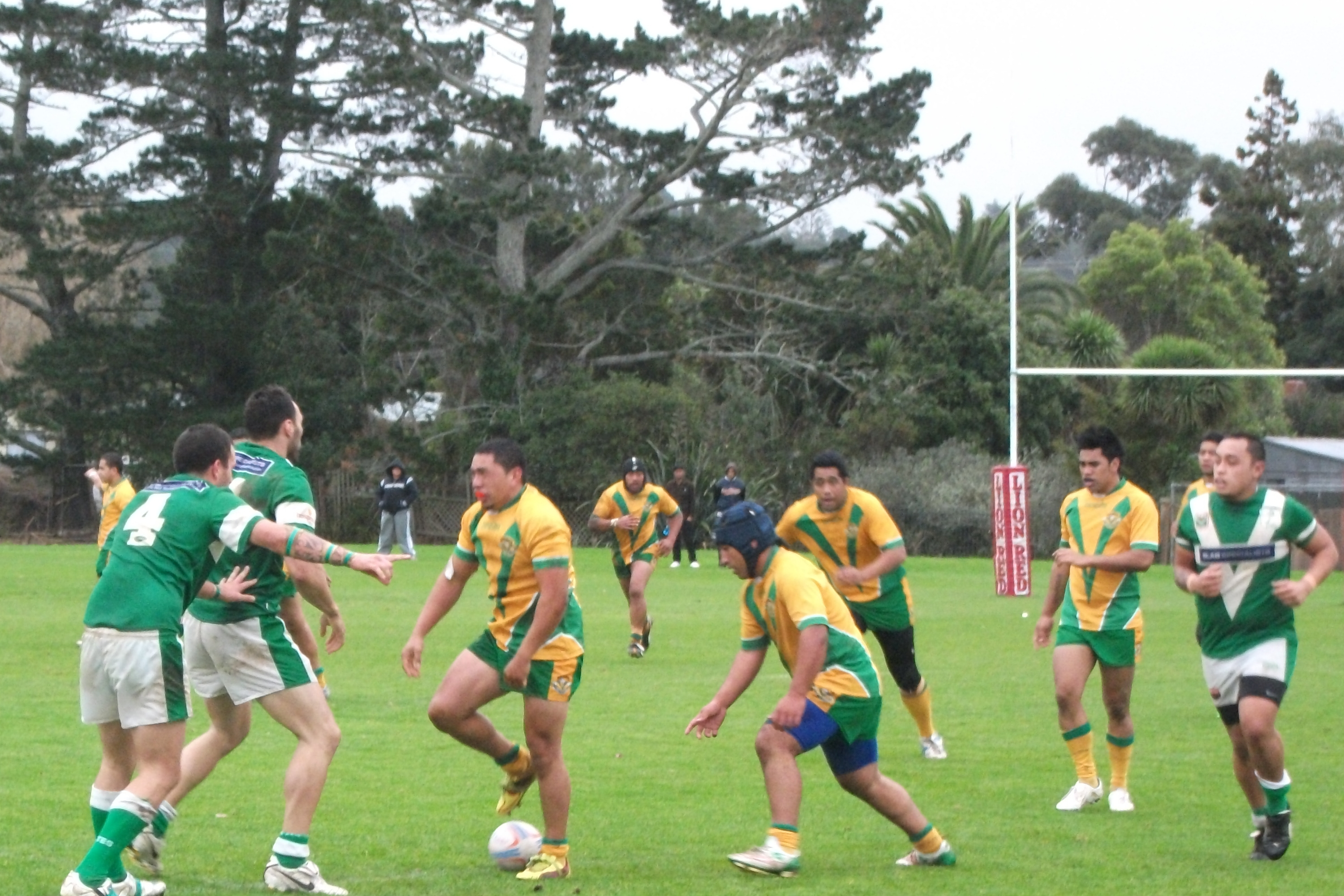
Koopu (second from left) playing for Pt Chev in 2010

In 2010 Koopu played alongside Stacey Jones and Awen Guttenbeil in rebuilding Pt Chev Pirates rugby league club in Auckland Rugby League's Phelan Shield.

In 2015, he was named at loose forward in Taniwharau's team of their first 70 years.

In March 2025, once his name suppression lapsed, it was revealed he had been charged with cocaine possession and supply in October 2024.
