= Craig Wing =

Australia international dual-code rugby player

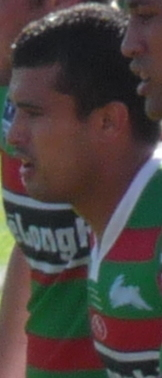

Personal information
- Born: 26 December 1979 (age 46) Sydney, Australia
- Height: 180 cm (5 ft 11 in)
- Weight: 89 kg (14 st 0 lb)

Playing information

Rugby league
- Position: Hooker, Halfback, Five-eighth, Fullback
Club
Years	Team	Pld	T	G	FG	P
1998–99	South Sydney	43	12	0	0	48
2000–07	Sydney Roosters	185	66	1	0	264
2008–09	South Sydney	28	8	1	0	34
	Total	256	86	2	0	346
Representative
Years	Team	Pld	T	G	FG	P
2008	Prime Minister's XIII	1	0	0	0	0
2001–09	NSW City	6	3	0	0	12
2003–09	New South Wales	12	2	0	0	8
2002–05	Australia	17	2	0	0	8

Rugby union
- Position: Centre/Fly-half
Club
Years	Team	Pld	T	G	FG	P
2010–12	NTT Communications Shining Arcs	21	10	5	0	50
2012–16	Kobelco Steelers	43	13	1	0	98
	Total	64	23	6	0	148
Representative
Years	Team	Pld	T	G	FG	P
2013–15	Japan	11	1	0	0	5
- Source: As of 11 October 2015

Craig Wing (born 26 December 1979), also known by the nickname of "Wingy", is an Australian-born former professional rugby league and rugby union footballer. He began his career in rugby league, playing for the South Sydney Rabbitohs and the Sydney Roosters in the NRL, representing Australia internationally and New South Wales in State of Origin. He switched to rugby union, playing in Japan for the NTT Communications Shining Arcs and the Kobelco Steelers, earning selection for the Japanese national team after completing three years residency.

== Background ==
Wing was born in Sydney, Australia. He is of Filipino descent through his mother. He attended Sydney Boys High School where he played rugby union. In 1997 Wing was selected to play in the New South Wales Schoolboys 1st XV where the team remained undefeated until the final decider.

== Acting career ==
Wing was a child actor, playing the part of Diego in episode six of Heartbreak High.

== Rugby league career ==
=== South Sydney ===
Wing made his first grade debut for South Sydney against the Auckland Warriors in round 1 1998 at Mt Smart Stadium. In round 10 of the 1999 NRL season, Wing announced himself as a talent of the future when he scored a solo try against Cronulla-Sutherland where he beat five Cronulla players to cross over the line. Wing scored two tries for South Sydney in what was to be their final ever game when they played against Parramatta in round 26 1999 at Parramatta Stadium. Following the conclusion of the 1999 NRL season, Souths were controversially excluded from the competition as part of the NRL's rationalisation policy. After Souths were excluded, he joined the club's arch rivals the Sydney Roosters.

=== Sydney Roosters ===
Wing played most of his professional rugby league at the Sydney Roosters. He moved to the club in 2000 and originally started as a halfback partnering Brad Fittler. Wing played from the interchange bench in the Sydney Roosters' 2000 NRL Grand Final loss to the Brisbane Broncos. He played at halfback in the Roosters team which won the 2002 NRL Grand Final against the New Zealand Warriors, scoring a try.

Having won the 2002 NRL Premiership, the Roosters travelled to England to play the 2003 World Club Challenge against Super League champions, St Helens R.F.C. Wing played at half back in the Roosters victory. Wing was later moved to hooker in 2003 when halfback Brett Finch joined the club. After his side's loss in the 2003 NRL grand final, Wing was selected to go on the 2003 Kangaroo tour of Great Britain and France, helping Australia to victory over Great Britain in what would be the last time the two nations contested an Ashes series.

Wing played for the Roosters at hooker in their 2004 NRL grand final loss to cross-Sydney rivals, the Bulldogs. Wing was selected in the Australian team to go and compete in the end of season 2004 Rugby League Tri-Nations tournament. In the final against Great Britain he played from the interchange bench in the Kangaroos' 44–4 victory.

Wing played in four NRL Grand Finals, a feat achieved by very few players in the NRL, and all with the Roosters: 2000, 2002, 2003 and 2004.

=== Return to Souths ===
Wing announced in June 2007 that he would be leaving the Roosters at the end of the 2007 NRL season to take up a four-year contract with the South Sydney Rabbitohs, the club where he started his career.

While the Roosters' offer was higher, Wing said he felt more comfortable accepting the Souths offer as it was a guaranteed four-year deal compared to the Roosters' 2-year deal with an option for a further 2 years.

Wing came under criticism for allowing himself to be paraded at a high-profile Souths press conference while still contracted at the Sydney Roosters. The Roosters broke the news of Craig Wing's signing on their website before Souths had officially signed him, and Wing apologised to the Roosters’ fans. He was jeered on 23 June 2007, by the Roosters fans at a game against the Parramatta Eels, his first game after signing for Souths.

In round 1 of the season, Wing was injured in a tackle in only the 8th minute of the game against his old club the Roosters. Wing was in the process of being tackled by Anthony Tupou and Braith Anasta, when Riley Brown shoulder charged Wing's back. Wing was sidelined for 12 weeks. In a much awaited return, Wing helped Souths to only their fourth win of the season in his return from injury, beating bottom placed North Queensland Cowboys 29–28 in the greatest comeback in Souths' history, having been down 28–4 at one stage of the game.

=== Representative career ===
Wing represented the New South Wales State of Origin team, City Origin and the Australian Kangaroos.

He was named in the Australia training squad for the 2008 Rugby League World Cup. He was selected for City in the City vs Country match on 8 May 2009.

In May 2009, he was named in the 17-man squad to represent New South Wales in the opening game of the 2009 State of Origin series on 3 June 2009, in Melbourne.

== Rugby union career ==
Wing announced on 21 July 2009 that he would be leaving South Sydney to play rugby union in Japan for the NTT Communications Shining Arcs and in 2010, he joined his former NSW Schoolboys 1st XV coach Joe Barakat who was coaching with the team.

In 2012, after two seasons with Shining Arcs, he moved to the Kobelco Steelers, where he is listed as playing centre or stand-off.

His switch to rugby union attracted interest from the Philippines national rugby union team who approached him to play for them, as he qualified through his mother who is Filipina. Despite this interest, in 2013 he was instead selected for the Japan Cherry Blossoms, having qualified after three years' residency. He made his debut for Japan in May 2013 in a match against the UAE. He scored his first try for Japan in June 2013, in a historic 23–8 win over Wales, playing at centre in a side coached by fellow Australian Eddie Jones.

Preceded by Anthony Field	Cleo Bachelor of the Year; 2000	Succeeded by David Whitehill
