= Shannon Hegarty =

Australia international rugby league footballer

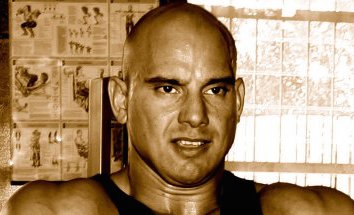

Personal information
- Born: 14 June 1979 (age 46) Brisbane, Queensland, Australia

Playing information
- Height: 184 cm (6 ft 0 in)
- Weight: 94 kg (14 st 11 lb; 207 lb)
- Position: Centre, Wing
Club
Years	Team	Pld	T	G	FG	P
1999–04	Sydney Roosters	109	52	0	0	208
2005–08	South Sydney	59	10	0	0	40
2009	North Qld Cowboys	5	2	0	0	8
	Total	173	64	0	0	256
Representative
Years	Team	Pld	T	G	FG	P
2005	Prime Minister's XIII	1	0	0	0	0
2003	Queensland	3	0	0	0	0
2003	Australia	4	2	0	0	8

Shannon Hegarty (born 14 June 1979) is an Australian former professional rugby league footballer who played in the 2000s. An Australia international and Queensland State of Origin representative three-quarter back, he played club football in the National Rugby League for the Sydney Roosters (with whom he won the 2002 NRL Premiership), South Sydney Rabbitohs and North Queensland Cowboys.

== Playing career ==
Originally from Brisbane, Queensland, Hegarty played for the Sydney Roosters at centre in their 2000 NRL Grand Final loss to the Brisbane Broncos.

Hegarty scored the Roosters' first try in their win over the Warriors in the 2002 NRL grand final and went on to victory in England for the resulting 2003 World Club Challenge. He was then selected to play on the wing for Queensland in every match of the 2003 State of Origin series. Hegarty scored a try whilst playing in the centres for the Roosters in their loss to Penrith in the 2003 NRL grand final. After that he was selected to go on the 2003 Kangaroo tour of Great Britain and France, helping Australia to victory over Great Britain in what would be the last time the two nations contested an Ashes series.

Hegarty played for the Roosters on the wing in their 2004 NRL Grand final loss to cross-Sydney rivals, Canterbury-Bankstown. In 2005, Hegarty joined the Sydney Roosters arch rivals South Sydney. In his first season at Souths the club finished 13th on the table.

In the 2006 NRL season, Hegarty made 10 appearances as the club finished last on the table. In the 2007 NRL season, Hegarty was part of the Souths team which reached the finals for the first time since 1989.

Released from the final year of his playing contract with South Sydney on a mutual agreement, Hegarty signed with the North Queensland Cowboys two days later.

== Post playing ==
Off the field, Hegarty posed for the Gods Of Football charity calendar in 2009 and appeared as Benji Veniamin in Tough Nuts: Australia's Hardest Criminals in 2011.

He was a trainer and conditioning coach for the Jacksonville Axemen of the USA Rugby League. He currently owns and operates Down Under Fitness gym & personal training in Jacksonville Beach, FL.
