= Damien Mostyn =

Australian rugby league footballer

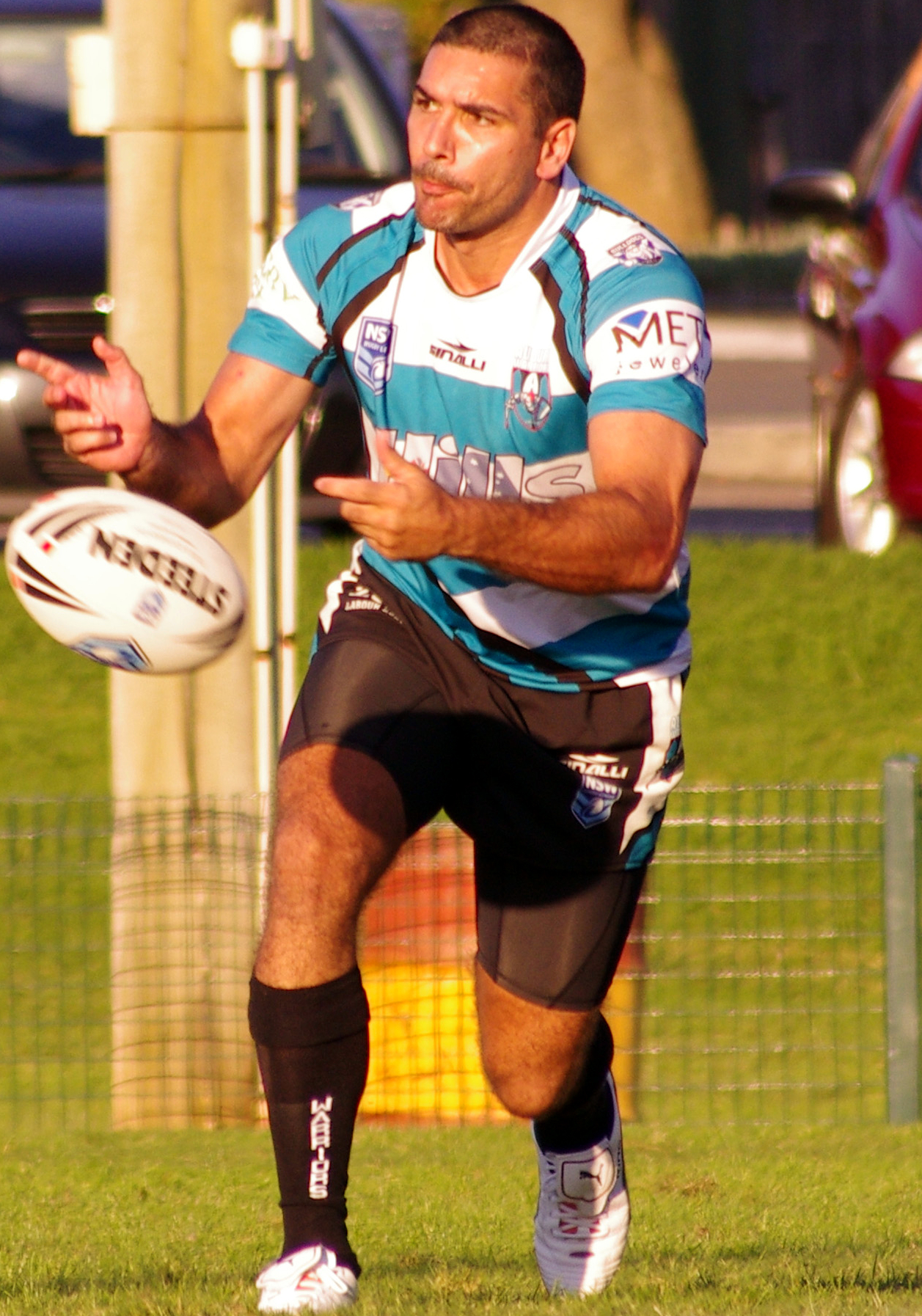

Personal information
- Born: 26 August 1978 (age 48) Sydney
- Height: 189 cm (6 ft 2 in)
- Weight: 94 kg (207 lb; 14 st 11 lb)

Playing information
- Position: Fullback, Wing
Club
Years	Team	Pld	T	G	FG	P
1997	Sydney City Roosters	2	0	0	0	0
2001	Cronulla Sharks	8	6	0	0	24
	Total	10	6	0	0	24
- Source: As of 14 September 2016

Damien Mostyn (born 26 August 1978, in Australia) is an Australian former professional rugby league footballer who played first-grade for the Sydney City Roosters and Cronulla Sharks. He played as a fullback or wing.
