= Lee Hookey =

Australian rugby league footballer

Personal information
- Full name: Lee Hookey
- Born: 6 April 1979 (age 47) Sydney, New South Wales, Australia

Playing information
- Height: 180 cm (5 ft 11 in)
- Weight: 95 kg (14 st 13 lb)
- Position: Centre, Wing
Club
Years	Team	Pld	T	G	FG	P
1999	South Sydney	17	5	0	0	20
2000–02	St. George Illawarra	61	32	0	0	128
2003–05	South Sydney	50	17	0	0	68
2006	Penrith Panthers	17	8	0	0	32
	Total	145	62	0	0	248

Lee Hookey (born 6 April 1979) is an Australian former rugby league footballer who played in the 1990s and 2000s. Hookey played for South Sydney (twice) 1999, 2003–05, St. George Illawarra Dragons 2000–2002, and Penrith in 2006, playing at Centre.

== Background ==
Hookey was born in Sydney, New South Wales, Australia.

== Career ==
Hookey made his first grade debut for South Sydney against Canterbury-Bankstown in round 1 1999 at the Sydney Football Stadium. Hookey played in what was then South Sydney's last game as a club which was against the Parramatta Eels in round 26 1999 at Parramatta Stadium. Following the conclusion of the 1999 NRL season, Souths were controversially excluded from the league as the NRL had deemed the club did not meet the requirements for the new 14 team competition.

In 2000, Hookey signed for St George and became a regular starter in the team. In the 2002 NRL season, Hookey finished as the club's top try scorer with 18 tries.

In 2003, Hookey rejoined South Sydney who were re-admitted to the competition the year prior. Hookey was one of the key players for South Sydney although the club struggled on the field finishing last in 2003 and 2004.

In 2006, Hookey signed for Penrith and played 17 games for the club as they missed out on the finals. He retired in 2007.
