= Paul Stringer =

Australian rugby league footballer

Personal information
- Born: 15 April 1976 (age 50) Gosford, New South Wales, Australia
- Height: 185 cm (6 ft 1 in)
- Weight: 108 kg (238 lb; 17 st 0 lb)

Playing information
- Position: Prop
Club
| Years | Team | Pld | T | G | FG | P |
|---|---|---|---|---|---|---|
| 1997–99 | North Sydney Bears | 27 | 5 | 0 | 0 | 20 |
| 2000–01 | Northern Eagles | 36 | 3 | 0 | 0 | 12 |
| 2002–04 | South Sydney | 48 | 5 | 0 | 0 | 20 |
| 2005–06 | Parramatta Eels | 32 | 1 | 0 | 0 | 4 |
| | Total | 143 | 14 | 0 | 0 | 56 |
Representative
| Years | Team | Pld | T | G | FG | P |
| 2002–05 | NSW Country | 2 | 0 | 0 | 0 | 0 |
- Source: As of 13 November 2019

Paul Stringer (born 15 April 1976) is an Australian former professional rugby league footballer who played as a prop in the 1990s and 2000s. He played his junior footy for the Berkeley Vale Panthers. He also went on to coach the Wyong Roos. Stringer later returned to Berkeley Vale Panthers as a senior.

He played with North Sydney, Northern Eagles, South Sydney and Parramatta years spanning 1997-2006. He played two matches for the Country Origin side in 2002 and 2005.

== Background ==
Stringer was born Gosford, New South Wales, Australia.

He attended Berkeley Vale Community High School on the Central Coast of New South Wales. This is the same school that produced Australia Rugby Union Wallaby star Adam Ashley-Cooper, Scottish and British Lions player Nathan Hines, Olympic Marathon runner and City to Surf winner, Martin Dent and icon of The Entrance Cricket Club & Mingara, Michael Thorpe.

== Playing career ==
Stringer made his first grade debut for North Sydney in round 17 1997 against South Sydney and scored two tries in a 40-8 victory at the Sydney Football Stadium.

Stringer made 27 appearances for North Sydney between 1997-1999 and was a member of the North Sydney side which played its final first grade game against the North Queensland Cowboys in Townsville. At the end of 1999, North Sydney merged with arch rivals Manly-Warringah to form the Northern Eagles as part of the NRL's rationalisation policy. Stringer was one of the few North Sydney players who elected to play on with the merged team.

Stringer played with the Northern Eagles until the end of 2001. He then signed for South Sydney who had just been re-admitted into the competition after they were controversially excluded from the league at the end of 1999. Stringer played in the club's first game after readmission which was a 40-6 loss against rivals the Sydney Roosters. Stringer played with South Sydney until the end of the 2004 NRL season although his time there wasn't successful with the club finishing last in 2003 and 2004. Stringer then signed for Parramatta after departing Souths.

Stringer was a key player in Parramatta's Minor Premiership in 2005 and again earned representative honours as a starting prop for the Country Origin side. Stringer played in Parramatta's finals campaign which ended when the club suffered a shock 29-0 loss against the North Queensland Cowboys in the preliminary final at Telstra Stadium.

Stringer's final game as a player came in round 11 of the 2006 NRL season against Penrith at Penrith Park.

== Post playing ==
Having been forced to retire prematurely in 2006 due to a neck injury, Stringer began as head coach of the Wyong Roos in 2007. Having withdrawn from the Central Coast competition and joined the much stronger Newcastle Rugby League, Stringer led the club to a grand final appearance in his first year in charge, losing to Lakes United.

In 2009, Stringer led the club to their first premiership in the Newcastle Premiership when he coached the side to a comprehensive victory over the heavily fancied Cessnock, 36–4.

After leaving Wyong, Stringer returned to play with his junior club, the Berkeley Vale Panthers, the club in which he led to their very first junior premiership when he captained the under 15s when he was a goal kicking hooker.

Stringer then joined the coaching ranks at Wests Tigers in 2015, taking charge of the forwards in the Under 20s competition. Head coach Jason Taylor then promoted Stringer to take charge as coach of the Wests Tigers NSW Cup side in 2016.

This saw a marked improvement for the club at this level as Stringer galvanised the playing group and led them to the brink of an unlikely grand final berth, falling short with a 24-18 loss to the highly fancied Mounties with less than 3 minutes to play. Wests Tigers management again moved to promote Stringer in their coaching hierarchy for the 2017 NRL season where he took up duties alongside Jason Taylor as the assistant coach of the NRL First Grade side. Stringer left the club soon after Taylor was dismissed in 2017.

In 2025, Stringer will coach Newcastle Rugby League side Kurri Kurri.
