= Scott McLean (rugby league) =

Australian rugby league footballer

Personal information
- Born: 30 March 1981 (age 45) Nepean, New South Wales, Australia

Playing information
- Position: Wing
Club
Years	Team	Pld	T	G	FG	P
2001	Northern Eagles	7	4	0	0	16
2002	South Sydney	9	6	24	0	72
	Total	16	10	24	0	88

Scott McLean (born 30 March 1981) is an Australian former professional rugby league footballer who played for the Northern Eagles and South Sydney in the National Rugby League (NRL).

McLean, who was a Penrith junior, played in the lower grades for North Sydney.

In the 2001 NRL season he joined the Northern Eagles and made seven first-grade appearances.

A winger, McLean switched to South Sydney for the club's return to the NRL in 2002. His try in the dying minutes of the 2002 Charity Shield pre-season fixture against St. George Illawarra secured a 20 all draw, having subsequently missed a sideline conversion for the win. He was South Sydney's top points-scorer in the club's comeback season, with 6 tries and 24 goals from his 9 appearances.
