= PJ Marsh =

Australian rugby league footballer

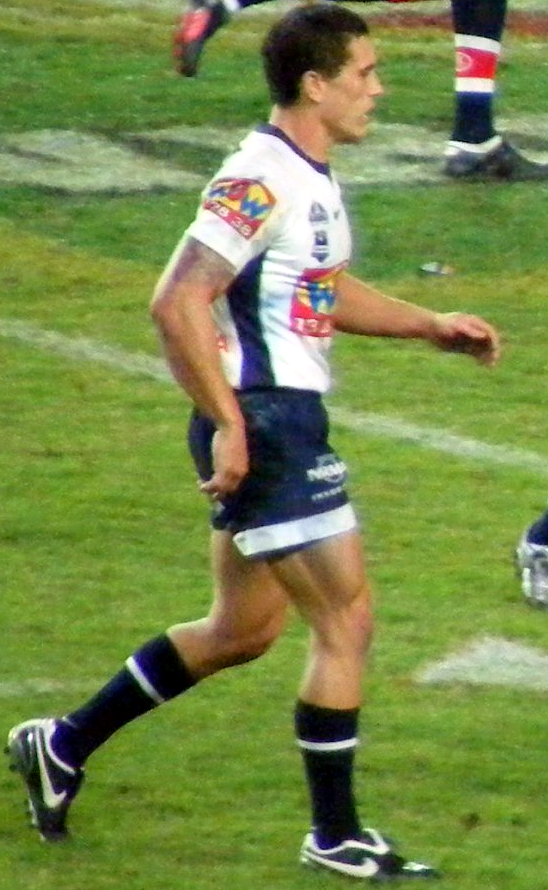

Personal information
- Full name: Peter-John Edward Marsh
- Born: 19 February 1980 (age 46) Gladstone, Queensland, Australia

Playing information
- Height: 173 cm (5 ft 8 in)
- Weight: 80 kg (12 st 8 lb)
- Position: Hooker, Halfback
Club
Years	Team	Pld	T	G	FG	P
2000–01	Parramatta Eels	34	7	0	1	29
2002–04	New Zealand Warriors	35	5	12	1	45
2005–07	Parramatta Eels	74	9	0	0	36
2008–10	Brisbane Broncos	15	1	0	0	4
	Total	158	22	12	2	114
Representative
Years	Team	Pld	T	G	FG	P
2002–08	Queensland	4	0	0	0	0

Peter-John "PJ" Marsh (born 19 February 1980 in Gladstone, Queensland) is an Australian former professional rugby league footballer who played in the 2000s. A Queensland State of Origin representative hooker, he played his club football in the NRL for the Parramatta Eels, New Zealand Warriors and Brisbane Broncos.

== Background ==
Named after his uncle, Peter John Marsh, who was killed in a car accident before PJ was born, he attended and played rugby league for St. Brendan's College, Yeppoon. Marsh is of distant Aboriginal descent. He is also Christian.

== Playing career ==
Marsh played for the Central Queensland Capras in the 1998 Queensland Cup. Marsh began his NRL career at the Parramatta Eels and made his first grade debut on 23 April 2000 against the Newcastle Knights. Marsh played in Parramatta's preliminary final defeat by the Brisbane Broncos during the same year.

In the 2001 NRL season, Marsh made 22 appearances as Parramatta won the minor premiership after losing only 2 games all year in the regular season. Marsh played for Parramatta from the bench in their 2001 NRL grand final loss to the Newcastle Knights. Parramatta had gone into the match as heavy favourites and the grand final loss has been described as one of the biggest upsets of all time.

Marsh then moved to the New Zealand Warriors. He made his Queensland debut in the 2002 State of Origin series, playing in games I and III. He later also played games in the 2003 and 2008 State of Origin series.

He started for the Warriors at hooker in their 2002 NRL Grand Final loss to the Sydney Roosters. In the Round 14 game against Parramatta on 14 June 2003, Marsh sustained a serious neck injury during a relatively minor crusher tackle by Parramatta second-rower Darren Treacy.

In an interview with The Daily Telegraph in 2022, Marsh recalled hearing a couple of cracking noises during the tackle, then feeling an intense pain throughout his entire body as he attempted to play the ball, stating: "It scared the absolute shit out of me. You try to wiggle your toes and move your fingers. It's a shocking fear. They put me in a brace. Then an ambulance. Then hospital and I couldn't move for two days." The injury ruled him out for the rest of the 2003 NRL season as well as the whole of 2004. Despite Marsh's injury and being sidelined until 2005, Treacy was not charged.

Following a three-year stint with the Warriors, Marsh returned to Parramatta for the 2005 NRL season. Marsh was part of the Parramatta side which won the minor premiership in 2005 but lost 29-0 in the preliminary final to North Queensland. During the regular season, Marsh was involved in an incident with Dragons captain Trent Barrett in which he carelessly made contact with him, resulting in Barrett retaliating by striking Marsh and receiving a one-match suspension from the incident.

Marsh's final game for Parramatta was the club's preliminary final defeat by Melbourne in the 2007 preliminary final.

In November 2007, Marsh signed a three-year deal with the Brisbane Broncos and returned to his home state of Queensland.

Marsh has said he didn't consider himself to be the same player during his final years with Parramatta and Brisbane, following the neck injury he sustained in 2003. After playing five games in 2009, Marsh suffered a back injury which ultimately led to him retiring on medical grounds in March 2010, with the Brisbane Broncos paying out the final year of his contract in full.

Because of his experience, Marsh is advocating for a crackdown on dangerous tackles in rugby league by having stronger penalties and deterrents including more sin binning and suspensions. Marsh said he remembers thinking crusher tackles were a "load of shit" when he first witnessed them come into the game, describing them as "worse than a punch", and said $1000 fines were a meaningless deterrent to highly paid athletes and wants players to be punished with suspensions instead.

== Retirement ==
In 2022, Marsh revealed he had developed a hatred for rugby league after his retirement. Marsh blamed the NRL for abandoning him after his injury, which left him with the inability to do things such as go for a run or use a gym, while also being left to pay tens of thousands of dollars in medical expenses, which included regular trips to Brisbane to see specialists and undergo tests and MRI scans.

Marsh accused the NRL for failing to assist him in any way and stated: "I couldn't believe the game wiped me the way they did" and claimed nobody had checked on him since his retirement. He said his mental health had been adversely affected during his retirement and he began to loathe rugby league, became reluctant to allow his children to play the sport and gave away most of his jerseys, apart from one State of Origin jersey which remained in the family.

According to Marsh: "At my lowest points I felt pretty damn ordinary. I hated football, I hated everything. I didn’t watch it, I didn’t want my kids to play. I gave all my jerseys away. My Warriors grand final jerseys. I didn’t want anything to remind me of the shit I’d been through... I didn't want my kids to play because I was that filthy on the game... I was still angry about what had been taken away from me."

Marsh lived in Middlemount for several years with his family which he said was to hide away from the world. As his mental health improved, Marsh completed a Certificate IV in youth work and worked at headspace for two years.

Unable to hold back their ambitions of being like their father, Marsh's wife Kelly registered their children to play rugby league while he was out of town. However, their interest in the game has since inspired Marsh to become involved with rugby league again.

== Personal life ==
Marsh lives with his wife and children in Yeppoon and he works on a drill rig at one the Central Queensland coal mines.

Marsh's eldest son Braelan played in the Under-16s boys team in the Queensland Rugby League's Cyril Connell Challenge in 2022 and was signed to the Dolphins Academy.

Marsh's daughter Waverley played for The Highlanders at Murri Rugby League Carnival in 2021 where she scored nine tries and was named in the Queensland Merit team. She was also part of the winning "beef" team in the annual Beef Vs Reef game at Browne Park in Rockhampton in 2022.

In 2022, Marsh's youngest son Jay played for Yeppoon Seagulls Under 14's team competing in the Junior Rocky Rustlers rugby league competition.
