= Jamie Fitzgerald (rugby league) =

Australian rugby league footballer

Personal information
- Full name: James Fitzgerald
- Born: 14 February 1979 (age 47) Mudgee, New South Wales, Australia

Playing information
- Position: Lock, Hooker, Second-row
Club
Years	Team	Pld	T	G	FG	P
1999	North Sydney	17	0	0	0	0
2000–01	St. George Illawarra	20	0	0	0	0
2002–03	South Sydney	15	2	0	0	8
2004	Newcastle Knights	5	0	0	0	0
	Total	57	2	0	0	8

Jamie Fitzgerald (born 14 February 1979) is an Australian former professional rugby league footballer who played in the 1990s and 2000s.

== Background ==
Fitzgerald was born in Mudgee, New South Wales.

== Playing career ==
Fitzgerald played for the North Sydney Bears in 1999, the St. George Illawarra Dragons from 2000 to 2001, the South Sydney Rabbitohs from 2002 to 2003 and finally the Newcastle Knights in 2004. Fitzgerald played in North Sydney's final ever game as a first grade side which was a 28-18 victory over North Queensland in Townsville.
