= Luke Felsch =

Australian rugby league footballer (born 1974)

Personal information
- Born: 5 April 1974 (age 51); New South Wales, Australia

Playing information
- Position: Lock
Club
Years	Team	Pld	T	G	FG	P
1994–98	St. George Dragons	56	3	0	0	12
1999	Gateshead Thunder	30	2	0	0	8
2000–01	Hull FC	58	9	0	0	36
2002	St. George Illawarra	16	1	0	0	4
	Total	160	15	0	0	60

Luke Felsch (born 5 April 1974) is a former professional Australian rugby league footballer.

== Career ==
Felsch came to St. George Dragons via Woodlawn College, in Lismore, New South Wales where he played in the Commonwealth Bank Cup. Felsch played for the St. George Dragons for five seasons between 1994 and 1998, including the Australian Rugby League grand final loss to Manly Warringah Sea Eagles in 1996.

Felsch played in St. George's final game before they formed a joint venture with the Illawarra Steelers to become St. George Illawarra. A semi-final loss to Canterbury-Bankstown at Kogarah Oval.

He then moved to Gateshead Thunder in 1999 and Hull FC in 2000–2001 before returning to Australia and joining St. George Illawarra in 2002 before retiring.
