= Andrew Hart (rugby league) =

Australian rugby league footballer

Personal information
- Full name: Andrew Hart
- Born: 9 March 1976 (age 49); Wollongong, New South Wales, Australia
- Height: 189 cm (6 ft 2 in)
- Weight: 103 kg (16 st 3 lb)

Playing information
- Position: Second-row, Prop, Lock
Club
| Years | Team | Pld | T | G | FG | P |
|---|---|---|---|---|---|---|
| 1997–98 | Illawarra Steelers | 37 | 4 | 0 | 0 | 16 |
| 1999–01 | St. George Illawarra | 67 | 7 | 0 | 0 | 28 |
| 2002–03 | South Sydney | 36 | 7 | 0 | 0 | 28 |
| 2004 | London Broncos | 13 | 2 | 0 | 0 | 8 |
| | Total | 153 | 20 | 0 | 0 | 80 |

Andrew Hart (born 9 March 1976) is an Australian former professional rugby league footballer.

Hart started his career at the Illawarra Steelers (1997–1998) and then spent time at the St. George Illawarra Dragons (1999–2001) and the South Sydney Rabbitohs (2002–2003). Hart finished his playing career with a year in the Super League with the London Broncos.
