= 2003 Penrith Panthers season =

- NRL Rank: 1st (Premiers)
- 2003 record: Wins: 18; draws: 0; losses: 6
- Points scored: For: 659; against: 527

Team information
- Coach: John Lang
- Captain: Craig Gower
- Stadium: Penrith Football Stadium – 22,500
- Avg. attendance: 17,829
- High attendance: 22,304

Top scorers
- Tries: Rhys Wesser (25)
- Goals: Preston Campbell (33)
- Points: Preston Campbell (164)
← 2002	List of seasons	2004 →

The 2003 Penrith Panthers season is the 37th season in the club's history. Coached by John Lang and captained by Craig Gower, the Panthers competed in the National Rugby League's 2003 Telstra Premiership. The Panthers won the club's second ever premiership after defeating the Sydney Roosters 18 – 6 in the grand final.

== Fixtures ==
=== Regular season ===
Date	Round	Opponent	Venue	Score	Tries	Goals	Attendance
Sunday, 16 March	1	Brisbane Broncos	Panthers Football Stadium	20 - 24	Girdler, Lewis, Priddis, Wesser	Campbell (2/2), Gridler (0/3)	13,499
Saturday, 22 March	2	Melbourne Storm	Olympic Park Stadium	42 - 16	Campbell, Gower, Wesser	Preston Campbell (2/3)	10,254
Sunday, 30 March	3	Sydney Roosters	Allianz Stadium	22 - 23	Wesser (3), Whatuira	Campbell (3/4), Gower (1 FG)	9,854
Saturday, 5 April	4	Canberra Raiders	Panthers Football Stadium	28 - 40	Wesser (2), Galuvao, Gower, Ross	Campbell (4/6)	14,472
	5	Bye					
Satday, 19 April	6	South Sydney Rabbitohs	Allianz Stadium	14 - 16	Lewis, Puletua, Waterhouse	Campbell (2/4)	9,308
Sunday, 27 April	7	New Zealand Warriors	Mount Smart Stadium	14 - 28	Wesser, Lewis, Rooney	Campbell (4/5)	15,732
Saturday, 3 May	8	Manly-Warringah Sea Eagles	Panthers Football Stadium	30 - 29	Wesser, Galuvao, Lewis, Priddis	Campbell (5/6)	19,676
Sunday, 11 May	9	St George Illawarra Dragons	Panthers Football Stadium	30 - 26	Campbell, Howland, Lewis, Wesser	Campbell (4/6), Rodney (2/2), Sattler (1/1)	17,862
Saturday, 17 may	10	Canberra Raiders	GIO Stadium	18 - 26	Whatuira (2), Rodney, Rooney	Campbell (5/5)	13,140
Sunday, 25 May	11	Wests Tigers	Campbelltown Stadium	4 - 26	Howland (2), Gower, Priddis, Wesser	Campbell (3/5)	4,125
Saturday, 31 May	12	New Zealand Warriors	Panthers Football Stadium	34 - 12	Campbell (3), Howland, Waterhouse, Whatuira	Campbell (5/7)	20,280
Saturday, 7 June	13	North Queensland Cowboys	Dairy Farmers	24 - 28	Galuvao (2), Lewis, Priddis, Rooney	Campbell (4/5)	17,102
Saturday, 14 June	14	Melbourne Storm	Panthers Football Stadium	12 - 32	Lewis, Wesser	Campbell (2/3)	15,863
Friday, 20 June	15	Newcastle Knights	Panthers Football Stadium	34 - 6	Priddis (2), Rooney (2), Campbell, Lewis, Whatuira	Campbell (3/7)	18,744
Sunday, 29 June	16	Canterbury-Bankstown Bulldogs	Panthers Football Stadium	28 - 26	Lewis (2), Elford, Rooney, Wesser	Campbell (4/6)	22,147
Saturday, 5 July	17	Cronulla Sharks	Endeavour Field	0 - 20	Campbell, Rooney, Wesser	Girdler	13,477
Saturday, 12 July	18	South Sydney Rabbitohs	Panthers Football Stadium	30 - 24	Galuvao (3), Rooney (2), Gower	Girdler (3/7)	15,251
Friday, 18 July	19	Newcastle Knights	Newcastle International Sports Centre	16 - 29	Rooney (2), Whatuira (2), Lewis, Waterhouse	Girdler (2/6), Gower (1 FG)	19,246
Sunday, 27 July	20	Sydney Roosters	Panthers Football Stadium	24 - 38	Campbell (2), Girdler, Whatuira	Girlder (4/4)	22,227
Sunday, 3 August	21	St George Illawarra Dragons	Wollongong Showground	34 - 28	Campbell (2), Rooney (2), Whatuira	Girdler (4/5)	15,310
Friday, 8 August	22	Brisbane Broncos	Suncorp Stadium	6 - 13	Puletua, Wesser	Girdler (2/2), Gower (1 FG)	31,180
	23	Bye					
Sunday, 23 August	24	Wests Tigers	Panthers Football Stadium	44 - 28	Lewis (2), Wesser (2), Priddis, Puletua, Rooney, Waterhouse, Whatuira	Girdler (4/9)	10,924
Saturday, 30 August	25	Manly-Warringah Sea Eagles	Brookvale Oval	26 - 52	Campbell (2), Lewis (2), Galea, Priddis, Puletua, Sattler	Campbell (6/7), Girdler (2/2)	9,774
Sunday, 7 September	26	Parramatta Eels	Panthers Football Stadium	40 - 22	Wesser (3), Gower, Rodney, Rooney, Swain	Girdler (6/7)	22,304
Legend: Win Loss Draw Bye

== Ladder ==
2003 NRL season
Pos	Team	Pld	W	D	L	B	PF	PA	PD	Pts
1	Penrith Panthers (P)	24	18	0	6	2	659	527	+132	40
2	Sydney Roosters	24	17	0	7	2	680	445	+235	38
3	Canterbury-Bankstown Bulldogs	24	16	0	8	2	702	419	+283	36
4	Canberra Raiders	24	16	0	8	2	620	463	+157	36
5	Melbourne Storm	24	15	0	9	2	564	486	+78	34
6	New Zealand Warriors	24	15	0	9	2	545	510	+35	34
7	Newcastle Knights	24	14	0	10	2	632	635	-3	32
8	Brisbane Broncos	24	12	0	12	2	497	464	+33	28
9	Parramatta Eels	24	11	0	13	2	570	582	-12	26
10	St George Illawarra Dragons	24	11	0	13	2	548	593	-45	26
11	North Queensland Cowboys	24	10	0	14	2	606	629	-23	24
12	Cronulla-Sutherland Sharks	24	8	0	16	2	497	704	-207	20
13	Wests Tigers	24	7	0	17	2	470	598	-128	18
14	Manly-Warringah Sea Eagles	24	7	0	17	2	557	791	-234	18
15	South Sydney Rabbitohs	24	3	0	21	2	457	758	-301	10

=== Ladder progression ===
- Numbers highlighted in green indicate that the team finished the round inside the top 8.
- Numbers highlighted in blue indicates the team finished first on the ladder in that round.
- Numbers highlighted in red indicates the team finished in last place on the ladder in that round
- Underlined numbers indicate that the team had a bye during that round.

	Team	1	2	3	4	5	6	7	8	9	10	11	12	13	14	15	16	17	18	19	20	21	22	23	24	25	26
1	Penrith	0	0	2	2	4	6	8	10	12	14	16	18	20	20	22	24	26	28	30	30	30	32	34	36	38	40
2	Sydney	2	4	4	6	8	10	10	12	12	14	16	18	18	20	20	20	22	24	26	28	30	32	34	36	36	38
3	Bulldogs	2	4	4	6	6	6	6	8	10	12	12	12	14	16	18	18	20	22	24	26	28	30	32	34	34	36
4	Canberra	2	4	6	8	10	12	14	16	16	16	18	20	22	22	22	24	24	26	28	30	30	32	32	34	36	36
5	Melbourne	2	4	6	6	8	8	8	10	12	12	14	14	14	16	16	18	20	22	22	24	26	26	28	30	32	34
6	New Zealand	0	2	4	6	8	10	10	10	12	14	14	14	16	16	18	20	20	22	24	26	26	28	28	30	32	34
7	Newcastle	2	2	2	4	6	8	10	10	12	12	12	14	16	18	18	20	20	22	22	22	24	26	28	28	30	32
8	Brisbane	2	4	6	8	8	8	10	12	14	16	18	18	20	22	24	26	26	26	28	28	28	28	28	28	28	28
9	Parramatta	0	0	2	2	2	4	4	4	4	4	4	6	6	8	10	10	12	14	16	18	20	22	22	24	26	26
10	St George Illawarra	0	2	2	4	4	6	8	10	10	10	12	12	14	14	16	18	20	20	22	22	24	24	24	24	24	26
11	North Queensland	0	2	4	4	4	4	6	8	8	10	12	14	14	14	14	14	16	16	16	16	18	18	20	22	24	24
12	Cronulla-Sutherland	0	2	2	2	2	2	4	4	6	8	10	10	10	12	12	14	14	14	14	14	16	16	18	18	20	20
13	Wests	2	2	2	4	4	4	4	4	6	6	6	8	8	8	10	10	12	14	14	16	16	16	18	18	18	18
14	Manly-Warringah	2	2	2	2	4	6	8	8	8	10	10	12	14	14	16	16	16	16	16	18	18	18	18	18	18	18
15	South Sydney	0	0	0	0	2	2	2	2	2	2	2	2	4	6	6	6	6	6	6	6	6	8	8	8	8	10
