= 2003 Cronulla-Sutherland Sharks season =

- NRL rank: 12th
- 2003 record: Wins: 8; draws: 0; losses: 16
- Points scored: For: 497 (92 tries, 64 goals, 1 field goal); against: 704 (121 tries, 109 goals, 2 field goals)

Team information
- Coach: Chris Anderson
- Captain: David Peachey Brett Kimmorley
- Stadium: Toyota Park
- Avg. attendance: 12,892

Top scorers
- Tries: Phil Bailey (13)
- Goals: Jarrad Anderson (35)
- Points: Jarrad Anderson (94)
← 2002	2004 →

The 2003 Cronulla-Sutherland Sharks season was the 37th in the club's history. Coached by Chris Anderson and captained by David Peachey and Brett Kimmorley, they competed in the NRL's 2003 Telstra Premiership. The Sharks finished the regular season 12th (out of 15), failing to make the play-offs for the first time since 1998.

== Season summary ==
Cronulla, hoping to build on its past four seasons in which it made the finals, suffered a season of unrelenting disappointment which culminated in the dismissal of head coach Chris Anderson.

The Sharks' 2003 season lowlight was the 74-4 thumping received at the hands of the Parramatta Eels at Parramatta Stadium on 23 August 2003 (round 24). Despite scoring first through Paul Gallen in the 18th minute, and only trailing 24–4 at halftime, the Sharks put in their worst ever performance which just got worse with captain David Peachey and Dale Newton taking the walk of shame and Danny Nutley being sin binned for pulling the leg of a Parramatta opponent. It would not be until Round 11, 2011 that the Sharks would again leave Parramatta Stadium on the back of a hiding; but this time the Sharks had a 40–6 defeat.

Highlights were few and far between in 2003; notable wins included a big 40–16 win over Manly in what was their first win for the season (also a big one) backed up with a 30–14 win over the South Sydney Rabbitohs, both at home and then a 30–24 away win over the 2001 premiers Newcastle in Newcastle in which Paul Gallen was sent off. It appeared as though those hat-trick of wins would get the Sharks going in 2003, but the Sharks were never in the finals hunt throughout the year. Other notable wins included a 34–28 win over the North Queensland Cowboys in Townsville, a comeback 20–10 win over the Brisbane Broncos after trailing 10–2 at halftime, a 25–16 win over bitter rivals St. George Illawarra at home and then a 54–34 win over the Rabbitohs in a bottom-of-the-table clash (this match occurring the week after the humiliating defeat against Parramatta).

Anderson was replaced during the off-season by Stuart Raper who had previous coaching experience with the Wigan Warriors. His term at the Sharks would only last three full seasons.

== Squad Movement ==
=== 2003 Gains ===
Player	Signed from
Jarrad Anderson	Western Suburbs Magpies
Jason Kent	St George Illawarra Dragons
Andrew Emelio	Canterbury Bulldogs
Junior Paulo	Penrith Panthers
Laloa Milford	Pia Donkeys
Shaun Wessell	Manly Sea Eagles

=== 2003 Losses ===
Player	Signed from
Colin Best	Hull FC
Luke Branighan	South Sydney Rabbitohs
Preston Campbell	Penrith Panthers
Brett Firman	St George Illawarra Dragons
Nick Graham	Wigan Warriors (mid-season)
Matthew Johns	Retired
Karl Lovell	Retired
Luke MacDougall	South Sydney Rabbitohs
Ryan McGoldrick	NSW Waratahs
Chris McKenna	Leeds Rhinos
Andrew Pierce	Retired
Ronald Prince	Parramatta Eels
Jared Taylor	South Sydney Rabbitohs
Dean Triester	Hull FC (mid-season)

== Ladder ==
2003 NRL season
Pos	Team	Pld	W	D	L	B	PF	PA	PD	Pts
1	Penrith Panthers (P)	24	18	0	6	2	659	527	+132	40
2	Sydney Roosters	24	17	0	7	2	680	445	+235	38
3	Canterbury-Bankstown Bulldogs	24	16	0	8	2	702	419	+283	36
4	Canberra Raiders	24	16	0	8	2	620	463	+157	36
5	Melbourne Storm	24	15	0	9	2	564	486	+78	34
6	New Zealand Warriors	24	15	0	9	2	545	510	+35	34
7	Newcastle Knights	24	14	0	10	2	632	635	-3	32
8	Brisbane Broncos	24	12	0	12	2	497	464	+33	28
9	Parramatta Eels	24	11	0	13	2	570	582	-12	26
10	St George Illawarra Dragons	24	11	0	13	2	548	593	-45	26
11	North Queensland Cowboys	24	10	0	14	2	606	629	-23	24
12	Cronulla-Sutherland Sharks	24	8	0	16	2	497	704	-207	20
13	Wests Tigers	24	7	0	17	2	470	598	-128	18
14	Manly-Warringah Sea Eagles	24	7	0	17	2	557	791	-234	18
15	South Sydney Rabbitohs	24	3	0	21	2	457	758	-301	10
