= 2003 St. George Illawarra Dragons season =

- NRL rank: 10th
- 2003 record: Wins: 11; draws: 0; losses: 13
- Points scored: For: 548; against: 596

Team information
- Coach: Nathan Brown
- Captain: Trent Barrett
- Stadium: Jubilee Oval, Wollongong Showground
- Avg. attendance: 13,061
- High attendance: 16,713 (vs. Cronulla, round 8)

Top scorers
- Tries: Nathan Blacklock (14)
- Points: Mark Riddell (166)
← 2002	2004 →

The 2003 St. George Illawarra Dragons season was the fifth in the joint venture club's history. The Dragons competed in the NRL's 2003 premiership season. The team finished tenth in the regular season, missing out on finals for the second time in their history.

== Squad gains and losses ==
▲ or ▼	Player	2002 Club	2003 Club
▲	John Cross	Penrith Panthers	St. George Illawarra Dragons
▲	Henry Perenara	Melbourne Storm	St. George Illawarra Dragons
▲	Quentin Pongia	Villeneuve XIII RLLG (Elite One Championship)	St. George Illawarra Dragons
▲	Hassan Saleh	Wests Tigers	St. George Illawarra Dragons
▼	Leo Clarke	St. George Illawarra Dragons	Retired
▼	Luke Felsch	St. George Illawarra Dragons	Retired
▼	Lee Hookey	St. George Illawarra Dragons	South Sydney Rabbitohs
▼	Jason Hooper	St. George Illawarra Dragons	St Helens R.F.C. (Super League)
▼	Wise Kativerata	St. George Illawarra Dragons	South Sydney Rabbitohs
▼	Jason Kent	St. George Illawarra Dragons	Cronulla-Sutherland Sharks
▼	Shane Millard	St. George Illawarra Dragons	Widnes Vikings (Super League)
▼	Willie Peters	St. George Illawarra Dragons	South Sydney Rabbitohs
▼	Ben Ross	St. George Illawarra Dragons	Penrith Panthers
▼	Justin Smith	St. George Illawarra Dragons	South Sydney Rabbitohs
▼	Colin Ward	St. George Illawarra Dragons	Penrith Panthers

== Ladder ==
2003 NRL season
Pos	Team	Pld	W	D	L	B	PF	PA	PD	Pts
1	Penrith Panthers (P)	24	18	0	6	2	659	527	+132	40
2	Sydney Roosters	24	17	0	7	2	680	445	+235	38
3	Canterbury-Bankstown Bulldogs	24	16	0	8	2	702	419	+283	36
4	Canberra Raiders	24	16	0	8	2	620	463	+157	36
5	Melbourne Storm	24	15	0	9	2	564	486	+78	34
6	New Zealand Warriors	24	15	0	9	2	545	510	+35	34
7	Newcastle Knights	24	14	0	10	2	632	635	-3	32
8	Brisbane Broncos	24	12	0	12	2	497	464	+33	28
9	Parramatta Eels	24	11	0	13	2	570	582	-12	26
10	St George Illawarra Dragons	24	11	0	13	2	548	593	-45	26
11	North Queensland Cowboys	24	10	0	14	2	606	629	-23	24
12	Cronulla-Sutherland Sharks	24	8	0	16	2	497	704	-207	20
13	Wests Tigers	24	7	0	17	2	470	598	-128	18
14	Manly-Warringah Sea Eagles	24	7	0	17	2	557	791	-234	18
15	South Sydney Rabbitohs	24	3	0	21	2	457	758	-301	10

=== Ladder Progression ===
Round	1	2	3	4	5	6	7	8	9	10	11	12	13	14	15	16	17	18	19	20	21	22	23	24	25	26
Ladder Position	11th	7th	9th	8th	10th	9th	8th	7th	9th	9th	8th	10th	10th	11th	9th	9th	7th	9th	7th	8th	8th	9th	9th	10th	11th	10th

== Season results ==
Round	Home	Score	Away	Match Information
Round	Home	Score	Away	Date	Venue	Referee	Attendance	Source
1	Wests Tigers	24 – 20	St. George Illawarra Dragons	15 March	Stadium Australia	Sean Hampstead	42,017
2	St. George Illawarra Dragons	30 – 28	Parramatta Eels	23 March	Wollongong Showground	Tim Mander	13,149
3	Canberra Raiders	18 – 14	St. George Illawarra Dragons	29 March	Canberra Stadium	Sean Hampstead	13,744
4		BYE
5	St. George Illawarra Dragons	12 – 38	Manly Warringah Sea Eagles	13 April	Wollongong Showground	Steve Clark	13,150
6	Canterbury-Bankstown Bulldogs	14 – 24	St. George Illawarra Dragons	19 April	Stadium Australia	Shayne Hayne	33,397
7 (ANZAC Day)	Sydney Roosters	20 – 24	St. George Illawarra Dragons	25 April	Sydney Football Stadium	Shayne Hayne	26,014
8	St. George Illawarra Dragons	28 – 12	Cronulla-Sutherland Sharks	4 May	Jubilee Oval	Bill Harrigan	16,713
9	Penrith Panthers	30 – 26	St. George Illawarra Dragons	11 May	Penrith Stadium	Tim Mander	17,862
10	St. George Illawarra Dragons	16 – 18	Canterbury-Bankstown Bulldogs	17 May	Wollongong Showground	Paul Simpkins	11,555
11	South Sydney Rabbitohs	16 – 18	St. George Illawarra Dragons	25 May	Sydney Cricket Ground	Bill Harrigan	11,104
12	St. George Illawarra Dragons	16 – 36	North Queensland Cowboys	1 June	Jubilee Oval	Shayne Hayne	13,517
13		BYE
14	Newcastle Knights	32 – 30	St. George Illawarra Dragons	13 June	Newcastle International Sports Centre	Sean Hampstead	18,233
15	St. George Illawarra Dragons	34 – 20	South Sydney Rabbitohs	21 June	Wollongong Showground	Sean Hampstead	10,220
16	Manly Warringah Sea Eagles	28 – 42	St. George Illawarra Dragons	28 June	Brookvale Oval	Steve Clark	11,161
17	St. George Illawarra Dragons	32 – 16	Brisbane Broncos	4 July	Wollongong Showground	Steve Clark	14,153
18	St. George Illawarra Dragons	18 – 19	Canberra Raiders	13 July	Jubilee Oval	Tim Mander	14,204
19	North Queensland Cowboys	16 – 36	St. George Illawarra Dragons	19 July	Willows Sports Complex	Paul Simpkins	16,542
20	Parramatta Eels	36 – 10	St. George Illawarra Dragons	26 July	Parramatta Stadium	Shayne Hayne	14,056
21	St. George Illawarra Dragons	34 – 28	Penrith Panthers	3 August	Wollongong Showground	Paul Simpkins	15,310
22	St. George Illawarra Dragons	20 – 30	New Zealand Warriors	10 August	Jubilee Oval	Bill Harrigan	12,595
23	Cronulla-Sutherland Sharks	25 – 16	St. George Illawarra Dragons	16 August	Endeavour Field	Sean Hampstead	15,504
24	St. George Illawarra Dragons	14 – 22	Melbourne Storm	22 August	Wollongong Showground	Tim Mander	11,367
25	St. George Illawarra Dragons	8 – 42	Newcastle Knights	31 August	Jubilee Oval	Steve Clark	10,798
26	Brisbane Broncos	25 – 26	St. George Illawarra Dragons	5 September	Lang Park	Tim Mander	35,597
