= 2003 NRL season =

Rugby league competition

2003 National Rugby League
- Teams: 15
- Premiers: Penrith (2nd title)
- Minor premiers: Penrith (2nd title)
- Matches played: 189
- Points scored: 8993
- Average attendance: 15,689
- Total attendance: 2,965,141
- Top points scorer: Hazem El Masri (294)
- Wooden spoon: South Sydney Rabbitohs (6th spoon)
- Top try-scorer: Rhys Wesser (25)

The 2003 NRL premiership was the 96th season of professional rugby league football in Australia and the sixth run by the National Rugby League. Fifteen teams competed, with the Manly-Warringah Sea Eagles returning in place of their failed joint-venture club, the Northern Eagles. Ultimately, the Penrith Panthers defeated reigning champions, the Sydney Roosters in the 2003 NRL grand final, claiming their first premiership since 1991.

== Season summary ==
Season 2003 brought in the new "golden point" extra time rule, where after 80 minutes, if the game was drawn, then 10 minutes of extra time was played until one team scored the winning point(s). The salary cap for the 2003 season was A$3.25 million per club for their 25 highest-paid players.

The first round of the Premiership improved on the previous year's in terms of attendance and television ratings. The major story this season was the resurgence of the Penrith Panthers, who won their second premiership in their history since joining the competition in 1967. Coached by John Lang and captained by Craig Gower, the Panthers were the surprise minor premiers and would continue their outstanding form in the finals, beating the Broncos, Warriors and finally the Roosters in the grand final.

The Dally M Medal ceremony was cancelled by the NRL after negotiations with the players' union, the Rugby League Professionals Association, stalled. All votes for the award were destroyed. It was later revealed that with one round of the regular season to play, Craig Gower was leading both Brad Fittler and Clinton Schifcofske by one point in the overall points tally. However, with the ceremony officially cancelled more than a week out from the awards, no points were allocated in the final round of the season.

At the end of the season, Chris Anderson would lose his job at Cronulla-Sutherland, while Peter Sharp was dismissed as the Sea Eagles coach. Trainer and former Manly star, Des Hasler would replace Sharp as head coach in 2004.

Also at the end of the season, a squad of players from the NRL premiership went on the 2003 Kangaroo tour.

A major flaw of the fixture was that the previous season's Grand Finalists, the New Zealand Warriors and Sydney Roosters, did not meet until the penultimate round of the regular season.

=== Teams ===
The lineup of fifteen teams for the 2003 premiership remained unchanged from the previous season, except that the Manly-Warringah Sea Eagles name and colours rejoined the competition since their merger with North Sydney Bears in 1999, taking the place of the failed Northern Eagles, Manly Warringah returned as a stand-alone in 2002, but played under the Northern Eagles name and colours

Brisbane Broncos; 16th season Ground: Suncorp Stadium; Coach: Wayne Bennett; Captain: Gorden Tallis	Bulldogs; 69th season Ground: Sydney Showground & Telstra Stadium; Coach: Steve Folkes; Captain: Steve Price	Canberra Raiders; 22nd season Ground: Canberra Stadium; Coach: Matthew Elliott; Captain: Simon Woolford	Cronulla-Sutherland Sharks; 37th season Ground: Toyota Stadium; Coach: Chris Anderson; Captain: Brett Kimmorley	Manly-Warringah Sea Eagles; 54th season Ground: Brookvale Oval; Coach: Peter Sharp; Captain: Steve Menzies
Melbourne Storm; 6th season Ground: Olympic Park; Coach: Craig Bellamy; Captain: Stephen Kearney	New Zealand Warriors; 9th season Ground: Ericsson Stadium; Coach: Daniel Anderson; Captain: Stacey Jones	Newcastle Knights; 16th season Ground: EnergyAustralia Stadium; Coach: Michael Hagan; Captain: Andrew Johns	North Queensland Cowboys; 9th season Ground: Dairy Farmers Stadium; Coach: Graham Murray; Captain: Paul Bowman	Parramatta Eels; 57th season Ground: Parramatta Stadium; Coach: Brian Smith; Captain: Nathan Cayless
Penrith Panthers; 37th season Ground: CUA Stadium; Coach: John Lang; Captain: Craig Gower	South Sydney Rabbitohs; 94th season Ground: Aussie Stadium; Coach: Paul Langmack; Captain: Bryan Fletcher	St. George Illawarra Dragons; 5th season Ground: Kogarah Oval & WIN Stadium; Coach: Nathan Brown; Captain: Trent Barrett	Sydney Roosters; 96th season Ground: Aussie Stadium; Coach: Ricky Stuart; Captain: Brad Fittler	Wests Tigers; 4th season Ground: Campbelltown Stadium & Leichhardt Oval; Coach: Tim Sheens; Captain: Darren Senter

=== Records and statistics ===
- Anthony Minichiello ran 4,571 metres with the ball in 2003, more than any other player in the competition.
- Nathan Brown became the youngest non-playing coach in premiership history at the age of 29. Brown had retired from playing in 2001 after a neck injury in a trial game.
- Referee Bill Harrigan's tenth grand final in 2003, the final match of his career, stands as the record for the most grand finals officiated by a referee.
- On 23 August the Parramatta Eels beat the Cronulla-Sutherland Sharks 74–4, at the time the third highest winning margin for a club game in Australian rugby league history.
- Also on 23 August, the North Queensland Cowboys beat the South Sydney Rabbitohs 60–8, at the time the biggest win and most points in a match in Cowboys history.
- The Brisbane Broncos set a record for their longest losing streak, from round 20 to the 4th qualifying final. This was equalled again from round 22, 2005 to round 1, 2006 inclusive, and then broken when the club lost thirteen consecutive matches between round 10, 2020 and round 2, 2021 inclusive.
- The Penrith Panthers became the first team to win the minor premiership and hold bottom spot on the ladder in the same season.
- The Penrith Panthers won 8 matches in a row from 19 April - 7 June, most wins in a row in the club's history. This was broken in season 2020, when the club won seventeen consecutive matches between round six and the preliminary final inclusive.
- The Bulldogs equalled their worst defeat with a 50–4 loss to the Melbourne Storm in round 22.
- The Brisbane Broncos suffered their worst ever defeat at Suncorp Stadium, losing to the Bulldogs 40–4 in round 18. This was later eclipsed by a 56–18 loss to the New Zealand Warriors in round 12, 2013, and then again with a 59–0 loss to the Sydney Roosters in round 4, 2020. They also only recorded one victory at the Stadium in season 2003, which came two weeks earlier with a 10–8 win over the Sydney Roosters (who, at that time had not won at Suncorp since 1991, however this drought ended in 2005).

=== Advertising ===
In 2003 the NRL sacked their advertising agency of the previous two years, Saatchi & Saatchi Sydney, and took the unusual step of coming up with their own in-house creative concept. Former Cronulla-Sutherland Sharks player and then current Parramatta Eels assistant coach Alan Wilson hit upon the idea of using the Hoodoo Gurus' 1987 hit "What's My Scene?" with reworked lyrics as "That's My Team".

"and another thing, I'm discovering lately, I'm a bit crazy, for my rugby league team "

Wilson is a friend of Hoodoo Gurus singer Dave Faulkner and made the necessary arrangements which included re-uniting the band to re-record the track. Faulkner is a long-time supporter of the Sharks and the original film clip of "What's My Scene?" had included shots of band members in Wests and Cronulla-Sutherland jumpers.

The ad focuses on the grass roots supporters at all levels of the game and in its finished version includes shots of fans from the Cessnock Goannas, a proud Bulldogs supporter and a Penrith teenager with a broken leg signed by her heroes. These images are included with the usual fare of pre-season team training images, big-hits, clever passes and post-try celebrations.

To produce the ad the League returned to the agency who created and produced the Tina Turner campaigns from 1989 to 1995 - Hertz Walpole Advertising by now renamed MJW Hakuhodo.

== Regular season ==
Team	1	2	3	4	5	6	7	8	9	10	11	12	13	14	15	16	17	18	19	20	21	22	23	24	25	26	F1	F2	F3	GF
Brisbane Broncos	PEN +4	SOU +2	**CRO** **+26**	NQL +8	**NZL** **−20**	SYD −7	PAR +6	WTI +32	**NQL** **+26**	**MEL** **+20**	CBY +24	**NEW** **−10**	X	CAN +4	X	**SYD** **+2**	SGI −16	**CBY** **−36**	MEL +4*	**MAN** **−6**	CRO −10	**PEN** **−7**	**WTI** **−2**	NZL −8	**PAR** **−2**	**SGI** **−1**	PEN −10			
Canberra Raiders	NQL +32	WTI +7	**SGI** **+4**	PEN +12	PAR +14	X	**CBY** **+4**	SOU +22	MEL −20	**PEN** **−8**	NZL +8	CRO +6	**PAR** **+36**	**BRI** **−4**	NZL −8	X	**MEL** **−10**	SGI +1	**WTI** **+2**	**CRO** **+28**	SYD −4	MAN +35	**NQL** **−6**	**NEW** **+8**	CBY +5	**SYD** **−7**	**MEL** **−12**	**NZL** **−1**		
Canterbury-Bankstown Bulldogs	**SOU** **+8**	NZL −4	WTI +32	**PAR** **+20**	NEW −6	**SGI** **−10**	CAN −4	NZL +6	**SYD** **+6**	SGI +2	**BRI** **−24**	**WTI** **−6**	SYD +10	**MAN** **+14**	MEL +14	PEN −2	**NEW** **+34**	BRI +36	X	**NQL** **+20**	SOU +50	**MEL** **+46**	MAN +32	X	**CAN** **−5**	CRO +14	**NZL** **−26**	**MEL** **+30**	SYD −10	
Cronulla-Sutherland Sharks	**MEL** **−4**	X	BRI −26	**SYD** **−20**	MEL −6	**NEW** **−8**	X	SGI −16	**MAN** **+24**	**SOU** **+16**	NEW +6	**CAN** **−6**	NZL −17	**WTI** **+2**	MAN −18	NQL +6	**PEN** **−20**	WTI −32	**NZL** **−7**	CAN −28	**BRI** **+10**	SYD −8	**SGI** **+9**	PAR −70	SOU +20	**CBY** **−14**				
Manly Warringah Sea Eagles	X	NQL −10	**NZL** **−4**	**WTI** **−26**	SGI +26	**MEL** **+6**	**SOU** **+8**	PEN −1	CRO −24	**PAR** **+2***	**NQL** **−11**	X	WTI +8	CBY −14	**CRO** **+18**	**SGI** **−14**	PAR −11	NZL −8	**SYD** **−24**	BRI +6	NEW −8	**CAN** **−35**	**CBY** **−32**	SYD −30	**PEN** **−26**	MEL −30				
Melbourne Storm	CRO +4	**PEN** **+26**	X	NEW −16	**CRO** **+6**	MAN −6	NQL −20	**NEW** **+40**	**CAN** **+20**	BRI −20	PAR +2	**SYD** **−7**	SOU −27	PEN +20	**CBY** **−14**	**WTI** **+8**	CAN +10	**NQL** **+6**	**BRI** **−4***	**SOU** **+18**	NZL +2	CBY −46	**PAR** **+38**	SGI +8	X	**MAN** **+30**	CAN +12	CBY −30		
Newcastle Knights	NZL +10	**SYD** **−4**	PAR −18	**MEL** **+16**	**CBY** **+6**	CRO +8	**WTI** **+28**	MEL −40	**SOU** **+14**	SYD −22	**CRO** **−6**	BRI +10	X	**SGI** **+2**	PEN −28	**PAR** **+14**	CBY −34	X	**PEN** **−13**	WTI −40	**MAN** **+8**	NQL +36	**NZL** **+16**	CAN −8	SGI +34	**NQL** **+8**	SYD −28			
New Zealand Warriors	**NEW** **−10**	**CBY** **+4**	MAN +4	**SOU** **+22**	BRI +20	**NQL** **+6**	**PEN** **−14**	**CBY** **−6**	**PAR** **+2**	X	**CAN** **−8**	PEN −22	**CRO** **+17**	PAR −2	**CAN** **+8**	SOU +1*	NQL −20	**MAN** **+8**	CRO +7	X	**MEL** **−2**	SGI +10	NEW −16	**BRI** **+8**	SYD +2	**WTI** **+16**	CBY +26	CAN +1	PEN −8	
North Queensland Cowboys	**CAN** **−32**	**MAN** **+10**	SOU +7	**BRI** **−8**	**SYD** **−32**	NZL −6	**MEL** **+20**	X	BRI −26	**WTI** **+18**	MAN +11	SGI +20	**PEN** **−4***	SYD −1	PAR −2	**CRO** **−6**	**NZL** **+20**	MEL −6	**SGI** **−20**	CBY −20	X	**NEW** **−36**	CAN +6	**SOU** **+52**	WTI +20	NEW −8				
Parramatta Eels	SYD −18	SGI −2	**NEW** **+18**	CBY −20	**CAN** **−14**	WTI +20	**BRI** **−6**	**SYD** **−32**	NZL −2	MAN −2*	**MEL** **−2**	**SOU** **+24**	CAN −36	**NZL** **+2**	**NQL** **+2**	NEW −14	**MAN** **+11**	X	SOU +14	**SGI** **+26**	**WTI** **+3**	X	MEL −38	**CRO** **+70**	BRI +2	PEN −18				
Penrith Panthers	**BRI** **−4**	MEL −26	SYD +1	**CAN** **−12**	X	SOU +2	NZL +14	**MAN** **+1**	**SGI** **+4**	CAN +8	WTI +22	**NZL** **+22**	NQL +4*	**MEL** **−20**	**NEW** **+28**	**CBY** **+2**	CRO +20	**SOU** **+6**	NEW +13	**SYD** **−14**	SGI −6	BRI +7	X	**WTI** **+16**	MAN +26	**PAR** **+18**	**BRI** **+10**	X	**NZL** **+8**	**SYD** **+12**
South Sydney Rabbitohs	CBY −8	**BRI** **−2**	**NQL** **−7**	NZL −22	**WTI** **+10**	**PEN** **−2**	MAN −8	**CAN** **−22**	NEW −14	CRO −16	**SGI** **−2**	PAR −24	**MEL** **+27**	X	SGI −14	**NZL** **−1***	SYD −28	PEN −6	**PAR** **−14**	MEL −18	**CBY** **−50**	WTI +2	SYD −10	NQL −52	**CRO** **−20**	X				
St. George Illawarra Dragons	WTI −4	**PAR** **+2**	CAN −4	X	**MAN** **−26**	CBY +10	SYD +4	**CRO** **+16**	PEN −4	**CBY** **−2**	SOU +2	**NQL** **−20**	X	NEW −2	**SOU** **+14**	MAN +14	**BRI** **+16**	**CAN** **−1**	NQL +20	PAR −26	**PEN** **+6**	**NZL** **−10**	CRO −9	**MEL** **−8**	**NEW** **−34**	BRI +1				
Sydney Roosters	**PAR** **+18**	NEW +4	**PEN** **−1**	CRO +20	NQL +32	**BRI** **+7**	**SGI** **−4**	PAR +32	CBY −6	**NEW** **+22**	X	MEL +7	**CBY** **−10**	**NQL** **+1**	WTI −8	BRI −2	**SOU** **+28**	X	MAN +24	PEN +14	**CAN** **+4**	**CRO** **+8**	**SOU** **+10**	**MAN** **+30**	**NZL** **−2**	CAN +7	**NEW** **+28**	X	**CBY** **+10**	PEN −12
Wests Tigers	**SGI** **+4**	**CAN** **−7**	**CBY** **−32**	MAN +26	SOU −10	**PAR** **−20**	NEW −28	**BRI** **−32**	X	NQL −18	**PEN** **−22**	CBY +6	**MAN** **−8**	CRO −2	**SYD** **+8**	MEL −8	X	**CRO** **+32**	CAN −2	**NEW** **+40**	PAR −3	**SOU** **−2**	BRI +2	PEN −16	**NQL** **−20**	NZL −16				
Team	1	2	3	4	5	6	7	8	9	10	11	12	13	14	15	16	17	18	19	20	21	22	23	24	25	26	F1	F2	F3	GF

Bold – Home game
X – Bye
* – Golden point game
Opponent for round listed above margin

== Ladder ==
2003 NRL season
Pos	Team	Pld	W	D	L	B	PF	PA	PD	Pts
1	Penrith Panthers (P)	24	18	0	6	2	659	527	+132	40
2	Sydney Roosters	24	17	0	7	2	680	445	+235	38
3	Canterbury-Bankstown Bulldogs	24	16	0	8	2	702	419	+283	36
4	Canberra Raiders	24	16	0	8	2	620	463	+157	36
5	Melbourne Storm	24	15	0	9	2	564	486	+78	34
6	New Zealand Warriors	24	15	0	9	2	545	510	+35	34
7	Newcastle Knights	24	14	0	10	2	632	635	-3	32
8	Brisbane Broncos	24	12	0	12	2	497	464	+33	28
9	Parramatta Eels	24	11	0	13	2	570	582	-12	26
10	St George Illawarra Dragons	24	11	0	13	2	548	593	-45	26
11	North Queensland Cowboys	24	10	0	14	2	606	629	-23	24
12	Cronulla-Sutherland Sharks	24	8	0	16	2	497	704	-207	20
13	Wests Tigers	24	7	0	17	2	470	598	-128	18
14	Manly-Warringah Sea Eagles	24	7	0	17	2	557	791	-234	18
15	South Sydney Rabbitohs	24	3	0	21	2	457	758	-301	10

=== Ladder progression ===
- Numbers highlighted in green indicate that the team finished the round inside the top 8.
- Numbers highlighted in blue indicates the team finished first on the ladder in that round.
- Numbers highlighted in red indicates the team finished in last place on the ladder in that round
- Underlined numbers indicate that the team had a bye during that round.

	Team	1	2	3	4	5	6	7	8	9	10	11	12	13	14	15	16	17	18	19	20	21	22	23	24	25	26
1	Penrith	0	0	2	2	4	6	8	10	12	14	16	18	20	20	22	24	26	28	30	30	30	32	34	36	38	40
2	Sydney	2	4	4	6	8	10	10	12	12	14	16	18	18	20	20	20	22	24	26	28	30	32	34	36	36	38
3	Bulldogs	2	4	4	6	6	6	6	8	10	12	12	12	14	16	18	18	20	22	24	26	28	30	32	34	34	36
4	Canberra	2	4	6	8	10	12	14	16	16	16	18	20	22	22	22	24	24	26	28	30	30	32	32	34	36	36
5	Melbourne	2	4	6	6	8	8	8	10	12	12	14	14	14	16	16	18	20	22	22	24	26	26	28	30	32	34
6	New Zealand	0	2	4	6	8	10	10	10	12	14	14	14	16	16	18	20	20	22	24	26	26	28	28	30	32	34
7	Newcastle	2	2	2	4	6	8	10	10	12	12	12	14	16	18	18	20	20	22	22	22	24	26	28	28	30	32
8	Brisbane	2	4	6	8	8	8	10	12	14	16	18	18	20	22	24	26	26	26	28	28	28	28	28	28	28	28
9	Parramatta	0	0	2	2	2	4	4	4	4	4	4	6	6	8	10	10	12	14	16	18	20	22	22	24	26	26
10	St George Illawarra	0	2	2	4	4	6	8	10	10	10	12	12	14	14	16	18	20	20	22	22	24	24	24	24	24	26
11	North Queensland	0	2	4	4	4	4	6	8	8	10	12	14	14	14	14	14	16	16	16	16	18	18	20	22	24	24
12	Cronulla-Sutherland	0	2	2	2	2	2	4	4	6	8	10	10	10	12	12	14	14	14	14	14	16	16	18	18	20	20
13	Wests	2	2	2	4	4	4	4	4	6	6	6	8	8	8	10	10	12	14	14	16	16	16	18	18	18	18
14	Manly-Warringah	2	2	2	2	4	6	8	8	8	10	10	12	14	14	16	16	16	16	16	18	18	18	18	18	18	18
15	South Sydney	0	0	0	0	2	2	2	2	2	2	2	2	4	6	6	6	6	6	6	6	6	8	8	8	8	10

== Finals series ==
Home	Score	Away	Match Information
Home	Score	Away	Date and Time	Venue	Referee	Crowd
Qualifying Finals
Canberra Raiders	18 – 30	Melbourne Storm	12 September 2003	Canberra Stadium	Tim Mander	14,094
Canterbury-Bankstown Bulldogs	22 – 48	New Zealand Warriors	13 September 2003	Sydney Showground	Bill Harrigan	18,312
Sydney Roosters	36 – 8	Newcastle Knights	13 September 2003	Aussie Stadium	Sean Hampstead	23,853
Penrith Panthers	28 – 18	Brisbane Broncos	14 September 2003	Penrith Football Stadium	Steve Clark	18,534
Semi-finals
New Zealand Warriors	17 – 16	Canberra Raiders	20 September 2003	Aussie Stadium	Tim Mander	31,616
Canterbury-Bankstown Bulldogs	30 – 0	Melbourne Storm	21 September 2003	Aussie Stadium	Bill Harrigan	19,367
Preliminary Finals
Sydney Roosters	28 – 18	Canterbury-Bankstown Bulldogs	27 September 2003	Aussie Stadium	Bill Harrigan	41,123
Penrith Panthers	28 – 20	New Zealand Warriors	28 September 2003	Telstra Stadium	Tim Mander	43,174

=== Finals Chart ===
Qualifying finals
1	Penrith	28
8	Brisbane	18
2	Sydney	36
7	Newcastle	8
3	Canterbury	22
6	New Zealand	48
4	Canberra	18
5	Melbourne	30

Semifinals
4W	New Zealand	17
2L	Canberra	16
3W	Melbourne	0
1L	Canterbury	30

Preliminary finals
1W	Penrith	28
New Zealand	20
2W	Sydney	28
Canterbury	18

Final
Penrith	18
Sydney	6

== Grand Final ==
2003 NRL Grand Final

Sunday, 5 October
19:05 AEST (UTC+10)

Penrith Panthers	18 – 6	Sydney Roosters
Tries: 3 Rooney 31', 73'; Priddis 66'; Goals: 3 Campbell 66', 74' (2/2); Girdler 32' (1/1); Field goals: Gower (0/1)	1st: 6–0; 2nd: 12–6; Report	Tries: 1 Hegarty 48'; Goals: 1 Fitzgibbon 50' (1/1)

Telstra Stadium, Sydney
Attendance: 81,166
Referee: Bill Harrigan
Touch judges: Steve Carrall, Glyn Henderson
Clive Churchill Medal: Luke Priddis (Penrith)

== Player statistics ==
The following statistics are as of the conclusion of Round 26.

Top 5 point scorers

Points	Player	Tries	Goals	Field Goals
270	Hazem El Masri	8	119	0
230	Josh Hannay	10	95	0
208	Clinton Schifcofske	8	87	2
180	Michael De Vere	12	66	0
170	Matt Orford	7	71	0

Top 5 try scorers

Tries	Player
24	Rhys Wesser
21	Matt Sing
21	Scott Donald
20	Joel Monaghan
19	Nigel Vagana
19	Billy Slater

Top 5 goal scorers

Goals	Player
119	Hazem El Masri
95	Josh Hannay
87	Clinton Schifcofske
71	Matt Orford
69	Mark Riddell

== 2003 Transfers ==
=== Players ===
Player	2002 Club	2003 Club
Ashley Harrison	Brisbane Broncos	South Sydney Rabbitohs
Allan Langer	Brisbane Broncos	Retirement
Lote Tuqiri	Brisbane Broncos	New South Wales Waratahs (Super 12)
Shane Walker	Brisbane Broncos	South Sydney Rabbitohs
Brett Finch	Canberra Raiders	Sydney Roosters
Ken Nagas	Canberra Raiders	Retirement
Todd Payten	Canberra Raiders	Sydney Roosters
Brett Howland	Canterbury-Bankstown Bulldogs	Penrith Panthers
Paul Rauhihi	Canterbury-Bankstown Bulldogs	North Queensland Cowboys
Darren Smith	Canterbury-Bankstown Bulldogs	Super League: St. Helens
Nathan Sologinkin	Canterbury-Bankstown Bulldogs	Melbourne Storm
Darrell Trindall	Canterbury-Bankstown Bulldogs	Retirement
Colin Best	Cronulla-Sutherland Sharks	Super League: Hull F.C.
Preston Campbell	Cronulla-Sutherland Sharks	Penrith Panthers
Nick Graham	Cronulla-Sutherland Sharks	Super League: Wigan Warriors
Matthew Johns	Cronulla-Sutherland Sharks	Retirement
Karl Lovell	Cronulla-Sutherland Sharks	Retirement
Chris McKenna	Cronulla-Sutherland Sharks	Super League: Leeds Rhinos
Paul Mellor	Cronulla-Sutherland Sharks	Super League: Castleford Tigers
Andrew Pierce	Cronulla-Sutherland Sharks	Retirement
Dean Treister	Cronulla-Sutherland Sharks	Super League: Hull F.C.
William Leyshon	Melbourne Storm	Parramatta Eels
Henry Perenara	Melbourne Storm	St. George Illawarra Dragons
Matt Rua	Melbourne Storm	N/A
Ian Sibbit	Melbourne Storm	Super League: Warrington Wolves
Richard Swain	Melbourne Storm	Brisbane Broncos
Julian Bailey	Newcastle Knights	Super League: Huddersfield Giants
John Morris	Newcastle Knights	Parramatta Eels
Clinton O'Brien	Newcastle Knights	Super League: Wakefield Trinity Wildcats
Bill Peden	Newcastle Knights	Super League: London Broncos
Kevin Campion	New Zealand Warriors	North Queensland Cowboys
Ivan Cleary	New Zealand Warriors	Retirement
Shontayne Hape	New Zealand Warriors	Super League: Bradford Bulls
David Myles	New Zealand Warriors	North Queensland Cowboys
Tim Brasher	North Queensland Cowboys	Bath (English rugby union)
John Doyle	North Queensland Cowboys	N/A
Peter Jones	North Queensland Cowboys	Retirement
Tim Maddison	North Queensland Cowboys	Newcastle Knights
Ken McGuinness	North Queensland Cowboys	Retirement
Lenny Beckett	Northern Eagles	ACT Brumbies (Super 12)
Shayne Dunley	Northern Eagles	Parramatta Eels
Jason Ferris	Northern Eagles	Manly Warringah Sea Eagles
Wade Forrester	Northern Eagles	Retirement
Jamie Goddard	Northern Eagles	Retirement
John Hopoate	Northern Eagles	Manly Warringah Sea Eagles
Nik Kosef	Northern Eagles	Retirement
Tasesa Lavea	Northern Eagles	Auckland (New Zealand rugby union)
Danny Lima	Northern Eagles	Manly Warringah Sea Eagles
Nathan Long	Northern Eagles	Manly Warringah Sea Eagles
Ben MacDougall	Northern Eagles	Manly Warringah Sea Eagles
Steve Menzies	Northern Eagles	Manly Warringah Sea Eagles
Robert Miles	Northern Eagles	Wests Tigers
Scott Pethybridge	Northern Eagles	Retirement
Brendon Reeves	Northern Eagles	Manly Warringah Sea Eagles
Mark Shipway	Northern Eagles	Manly Warringah Sea Eagles
Albert Torrens	Northern Eagles	Manly Warringah Sea Eagles
David Westley	Northern Eagles	Retirement
Luke Williamson	Northern Eagles	Manly Warringah Sea Eagles
Michael Buettner	Parramatta Eels	Wests Tigers
Scott Donald	Parramatta Eels	Manly Warringah Sea Eagles
Brad Drew	Parramatta Eels	Canberra Raiders
Ian Hindmarsh	Parramatta Eels	Canberra Raiders
Ben Kusto	Parramatta Eels	Retirement
Andrew McFadden	Parramatta Eels	Melbourne Storm
Andrew Ryan	Parramatta Eels	Canterbury-Bankstown Bulldogs
Ned Catic	Penrith Panthers	Sydney Roosters
John Cross	Penrith Panthers	St. George Illawarra Dragons
Jody Gall	Penrith Panthers	Retirement
Lee Hopkins	Penrith Panthers	Parramatta Eels
Justin Brooker	South Sydney Rabbitohs	Retirement
Chris Caruana	South Sydney Rabbitohs	Retirement
Anthony Colella	South Sydney Rabbitohs	Super League: Huddersfield Giants
Glenn Grief	South Sydney Rabbitohs	Retirement
Brent Grose	South Sydney Rabbitohs	Super League: Warrington Wolves
Andrew King	South Sydney Rabbitohs	Super League: London Broncos
Paul McNicholas	South Sydney Rabbitohs	North Queensland Cowboys
Adam Muir	South Sydney Rabbitohs	Retirement
Adam Peek	South Sydney Rabbitohs	Parramatta Eels
Luke Felsch	St. George Illawarra Dragons	Retirement
Lee Hookey	St. George Illawarra Dragons	South Sydney Rabbitohs
Jason Hooper	St. George Illawarra Dragons	Super League: St. Helens
Shane Millard	St. George Illawarra Dragons	Super League: Widnes Vikings
Willie Peters	St. George Illawarra Dragons	South Sydney Rabbitohs
Justin Smith	St. George Illawarra Dragons	South Sydney Rabbitohs
Bryan Fletcher	Sydney Roosters	South Sydney Rabbitohs
Paul Green	Sydney Roosters	Parramatta Eels
Dallas Hood	Sydney Roosters	Super League: Wakefield Trinity Wildcats
David Kidwell	Sydney Roosters	Melbourne Storm
Brett Mullins	Sydney Roosters	Retirement
Luke Phillips	Sydney Roosters	Retirement
Steven Crouch	Wests Tigers	Parramatta Eels
Ben Jeffries	Wests Tigers	Super League: Wakefield Trinity Wildcats
Kevin McGuinness	Wests Tigers	Manly Warringah Sea Eagles
Hassan Saleh	Wests Tigers	St. George Illawarra Dragons
Matt Seers	Wests Tigers	Super League: Wakefield Trinity Wildcats
Robbie Beckett	Super League: Halifax Blue Sox	Wests Tigers
Tonie Carroll	Super League: Leeds Rhinos	Brisbane Broncos
Ben Walker	Super League: Leeds Rhinos	Manly Warringah Sea Eagles
Darren Treacy	Super League: Salford City Reds	Parramatta Eels
Solomon Haumono	Hiatus	Manly Warringah Sea Eagles
