= 2003 Sydney Roosters season =

← 2002	2004 →

The 2003 Sydney Roosters season was the 96th in the club's history. Coached by Ricky Stuart and captained by Brad Fittler, the Roosters competed in the National Rugby League's 2003 Telstra Premiership and finished the regular season 2nd (out of 15). They reached the 2003 NRL grand final which they lost to the Penrith Panthers.

A total of four Roosters players, Shannon Hegarty, Anthony Minichiello, Luke Ricketson and Michael Crocker, were selected to make their Test match débuts for the Australian national team in 2003.

Nine Roosters players were selected to play in the mid-season 2003 State of Origin series: Craig Fitzgibbon, Craig Wing, Luke Ricketson, Bryan Fletcher and Anthony Minichiello for New South Wales; and Shannon Hegarty, Chris Flannery, Justin Hodges and Michael Crocker for Queensland.

== Ladder ==
2003 NRL season
Pos	Team	Pld	W	D	L	B	PF	PA	PD	Pts
1	Penrith Panthers (P)	24	18	0	6	2	659	527	+132	40
2	Sydney Roosters	24	17	0	7	2	680	445	+235	38
3	Canterbury-Bankstown Bulldogs	24	16	0	8	2	702	419	+283	36
4	Canberra Raiders	24	16	0	8	2	620	463	+157	36
5	Melbourne Storm	24	15	0	9	2	564	486	+78	34
6	New Zealand Warriors	24	15	0	9	2	545	510	+35	34
7	Newcastle Knights	24	14	0	10	2	632	635	-3	32
8	Brisbane Broncos	24	12	0	12	2	497	464	+33	28
9	Parramatta Eels	24	11	0	13	2	570	582	-12	26
10	St George Illawarra Dragons	24	11	0	13	2	548	593	-45	26
11	North Queensland Cowboys	24	10	0	14	2	606	629	-23	24
12	Cronulla-Sutherland Sharks	24	8	0	16	2	497	704	-207	20
13	Wests Tigers	24	7	0	17	2	470	598	-128	18
14	Manly-Warringah Sea Eagles	24	7	0	17	2	557	791	-234	18
15	South Sydney Rabbitohs	24	3	0	21	2	457	758	-301	10
