= 2003 Bulldogs RLFC season =

← 2002	2004 →

The 2003 Bulldogs RLFC season was the 69th in the club's history. Coached by Steve Folkes and captained by Steve Price, they competed in the NRL's 2003 Telstra Premiership, finishing the regular season 3rd (out of 15), and making the finals after finishing the previous season with the wooden spoon due to salary cap breaches. The Bulldogs went on to come within one game of the 2003 NRL Grand final but were knocked out by the Sydney Roosters.

Kevin Stewart was the Bulldogs Leagues Club President in 2003.

== Players ==
The Bulldogs' status for the 2003 season:

Departing players: Darren Smith (retired), Paul Rauhihi (North Queensland).

On contract: Braith Anasta, Roy Asotasi, Hazem El Masri, Jamie Feeney, Tony Grimaldi, Glenn Hall, Ben Harris, Corey Hughes, Glen Hughes, Shane Marteene, Willie Mason, Travis Norton, Mark O'Meley, Luke Patten, Adam Perry, Steve Price, Steve Reardon, Andrew Ryan, Brent Sherwin, Willie Talau, Johnathan Thurston, Matt Utai, Nigel Vagana (two to be added).

Off contract: Gavin Lester, Brett Howland, Dennis Scott, Nathan Sologinkin.

== Results ==
2003 Season Results
Round	Opponent	Result	Bulldogs	Opposition	Date	Venue	Crowd	Source
1	South Sydney Rabbitohs	Win	34	26	15 March	Telstra Stadium	42,017	
2	New Zealand Warriors	Loss	20	24	23 March	Ericsson Stadium	16,229	
3	Wests Tigers	Win	38	6	29 March	Campbelltown Stadium	15,774	
4	Parramatta Eels	Win	30	10	4 April	Telstra Stadium	24,907	
5	Newcastle Knights	Loss	6	12	11 April	EnergyAustralia Stadium	22,212	
6	St. George Illawarra Dragons	Loss	14	24	19 April	Telstra Stadium	33,379	
7	Canberra Raiders	Loss	22	28	26 April	Canberra Stadium	19,372	
8	New Zealand Warriors	Win	18	12	2 May	WestPacTrust Stadium	21,989	
9	Sydney Roosters	Win	32	26	9 May	Telstra Stadium	27,132	
10	St. George Illawarra Dragons	Win	18	16	17 May	WIN Stadium	11,555	

== Ladder ==
2003 NRL season
Pos	Team	Pld	W	D	L	B	PF	PA	PD	Pts
1	Penrith Panthers (P)	24	18	0	6	2	659	527	+132	40
2	Sydney Roosters	24	17	0	7	2	680	445	+235	38
3	Canterbury-Bankstown Bulldogs	24	16	0	8	2	702	419	+283	36
4	Canberra Raiders	24	16	0	8	2	620	463	+157	36
5	Melbourne Storm	24	15	0	9	2	564	486	+78	34
6	New Zealand Warriors	24	15	0	9	2	545	510	+35	34
7	Newcastle Knights	24	14	0	10	2	632	635	-3	32
8	Brisbane Broncos	24	12	0	12	2	497	464	+33	28
9	Parramatta Eels	24	11	0	13	2	570	582	-12	26
10	St George Illawarra Dragons	24	11	0	13	2	548	593	-45	26
11	North Queensland Cowboys	24	10	0	14	2	606	629	-23	24
12	Cronulla-Sutherland Sharks	24	8	0	16	2	497	704	-207	20
13	Wests Tigers	24	7	0	17	2	470	598	-128	18
14	Manly-Warringah Sea Eagles	24	7	0	17	2	557	791	-234	18
15	South Sydney Rabbitohs	24	3	0	21	2	457	758	-301	10

== See also ==
- List of Canterbury-Bankstown Bulldogs seasons
