= 2003 State of Origin series =

Australian rugby league series

- Won by: New South Wales (10th title)
- Series margin: 2-1
- Points scored: 110
- Attendance: 183,682 (ave. 61,227 per match)
- Top points scorer(s): Andrew Johns (22)
- Top try scorer(s): Anthony Minichiello (3); Timana Tahu (3); Matt Sing (3)

The 2003 State of Origin series was the 22nd year that the annual three-game series between Queensland and New South Wales was contested entirely under 'state of origin' selection rules. Queensland's return to a renovated Lang Park was soured when Andrew Johns returned to form for New South Wales in devastating fashion.

Arnold Schwarzenegger appeared in television promotions for the 2003 series. Blues coach Phil Gould sparked controversy before the series had even started when he slammed the form of his champion half-back Johns in his Sun-Herald column. Gould claimed that Johns had lost his "self-confidence" in an attack that caused outrage from all corners, including Johns himself, who had words with Gould at a pre-Origin briefing. But in the end it was psychology that worked, as 2003 was Johns' best ever series performance.

== Game I ==
Wednesday, 11 June 2003

Queensland	12–25	New South Wales
Darren Lockyer (8 - 1t,2g); Gorden Tallis (4 -1t)	(Report)	(13 - 1t,4g,1fg) Andrew Johns (8 - 2t) Anthony Minichiello (4 -1t) Craig Wing

Suncorp Stadium, Brisbane
Attendance: 52,429
Referee: Bill Harrigan
Player of the Match: Luke Bailey

In Game I, Andrew Johns spoiled what was supposed to be a party time for the Queenslanders, who returned to their spiritual home of Suncorp Stadium formerly known as Lang Park. The ground was quickly nicknamed the "Sand Pit" as its sandy surface was constantly shifting under the feet of players. Both Maroons centres Justin Hodges and Paul Bowman, were taken from the field with serious knee injuries which were later blamed on the shifting surface.

The Blues pack led by interchange prop Luke Bailey, hammered their Maroons counterparts and gave Johns plenty of room to weave his magic. Johns contributed 13 points to the tally while Anthony Minichiello scored a try double.

== Game II ==
Wednesday, 25 June 2003

New South Wales	27–4	Queensland
(8 - 2t) Timana Tahu (7 - 3g,1fg) Andrew Johns (4 - 1t) Ben Kennedy (4 - 1t)Matthew Gidley (4 - 1t) Anthony Minichiello	(Report)	Michael Crocker (4 - 1t)

Telstra Stadium, Sydney
Attendance: 79,132
Referee: Bill Harrigan
Player of the Match: Andrew Johns

The series was virtually decided by half-time of game II after the Blues raced to a 17–0 lead. Johns was again the catalyst starting the scoring with a brilliant banana kick that rebounded off the cross bar, went through the hands of Michael De Vere and fell to the ground before Ben Kennedy pounced.

There was no greater example of the brilliant halfback's influence than the last minute before the break. Johns kicked for touch from a 20-metre restart, then after winning the ensuing scrum, hoisted a bomb high into the air which was contested before being batted back into his hands. Without a second thought and while on the run, he potted a 25-metre field goal with ease.

The final score was 27–4 to the Blues who remained unbeaten from seven matches on their home turf of Telstra Stadium.

== Game III ==
Wednesday, 16 July 2003

Queensland	36–6	New South Wales
Matt Sing (12 - 3t); Brent Tate (8 - 2t); Josh Hannay (8 - 4g); Cameron Smith (4 - 1t); Michael Crocker (4 - 1t)	(Report)	(4 - 1t) Timana Tahu (2 - 1g) Andrew Johns

Suncorp Stadium, Brisbane
Attendance: 52,130
Referee: Bill Harrigan
Player of the Match: Matt Sing

Game III, a "dead rubber", restored some much needed pride for the Maroons who dominated the Blues in every facet of the game. Winger Matt Sing was superb, scoring three tries in a man-of-the match performance.

Queensland led 16-0 after 17 minutes before strangling the Blues out of the contest. Johns was forced to accept the shield in front of an almost empty stadium after Queensland had completed a lap of honour. It was an anticlimactic end to Blues winnning streak. Queensland's dead rubber win equalled their biggest State of Origin victory, which was first equalled in 1989, and then again in 2008, before it was broken in the third game of the 2015 series.

== Teams ==
A total of twelve players from the 2003 Brisbane Broncos season were selected to play in the series, making them the most heavily represented club. A total of nine players from the 2003 Sydney Roosters season were selected to play in the series, making them the second most heavily represented club.

=== New South Wales ===
Position	Game 1	Game 2	Game 3
Fullback	Anthony Minichiello		
Wing	Timana Tahu		
Centre	Matt Gidley		
Centre	Jamie Lyon		
Wing	Michael De Vere		
Five-Eighth	Shaun Timmins		
Halfback	Andrew Johns (c)		
Prop	Robbie Kearns		
Hooker	Danny Buderus		
Prop	Jason Ryles		
Second Row	Craig Fitzgibbon		Bryan Fletcher
Second Row	Ben Kennedy		Luke Ricketson
Lock	Luke Ricketson		Braith Anasta
Interchange	Luke Bailey		
Interchange	Phil Bailey		
Interchange	Craig Wing		
Interchange	Josh Perry	Bryan Fletcher	Willie Mason
Coach	Phil Gould		

=== Queensland ===
Position	Game 1	Game 2	Game 3
Fullback	Darren Lockyer		
Wing	Shannon Hegarty		
Centre	Brent Tate		
Centre	Justin Hodges	Tonie Carroll	Josh Hannay
Wing	Matt Sing		
Five-Eighth	Ben Ikin		
Halfback	Shaun Berrigan		
Prop	Shane Webcke		
Hooker	PJ Marsh	Michael Crocker	Cameron Smith
Prop	Petero Civoniceva	Steve Price	Petero Civoniceva
Second Row	Gorden Tallis (c)		
Second Row	Dane Carlaw	Petero Civoniceva	Dane Carlaw
Lock	Tonie Carroll	Travis Norton	Tonie Carroll
Interchange	Steve Price	Dane Carlaw	Steve Price
Interchange	Chris Flannery	Andrew Gee	Travis Norton
Interchange	Paul Bowman	Scott Sattler	Michael Crocker
Interchange	Andrew Gee	Matt Bowen	
Coach	Wayne Bennett		

== See also ==
- 2003 NRL season

== Footnotes ==
- Big League's 25 Years of Origin Collectors' Edition, News Magazines, Surry Hills, Sydney
