= 2003 Parramatta Eels season =

Australia Rugby League Parramatta Eels 2003 season

- NRL Rank: 9th
- Play-off result: DNQ
- World Club Challenge: DNQ
- World Sevens: Champions (Won 48–18 vs England Lions, Grand Final)
- 2003 record: Wins: 11; draws: 0; losses: 13
- Points scored: For: 570; against: 582

Team information
- CEO: Denis Fitzgerald
- Coach: (Australia) Brian Smith
- Captain: (New Zealand) Nathan Cayless
- Stadium: Parramatta Stadium (Capacity: 20,741)
- Avg. attendance: 11,262 (Home); 14,762 (Home & Away)
- Agg. attendance: 135,142 (Home); 354,283 (Home & Away)
- High attendance: 17,175 (28 March vs Newcastle Knights, Round 3)

Top scorers
- Tries: (Australia) Jamie Lyon (14) (United States) Matt Petersen
- Goals: (Australia) Michael Witt (45)
- Points: (Australia) Michael Witt (104)
← 2002	List of seasons	2004 →

The 2003 Parramatta Eels season was the 57th in the club's history. Coached by Brian Smith and captained by Nathan Cayless, they competed in the National Rugby League's 2003 Telstra Premiership.

== Summary ==
After reaching the Finals Series every year for the last six years, Parramatta could not make it a 7th year running as they finished 9th in the 2003 Season. Needing to beat runaway Minor Premiers the Penrith Panthers by over 30 points in the final round, the Eels were comprehensively beaten away, signalling the need for changes at the club should they continue to be successful.

== Standings ==
2003 NRL season
Pos	Team	Pld	W	D	L	B	PF	PA	PD	Pts
1	Penrith Panthers (P)	24	18	0	6	2	659	527	+132	40
2	Sydney Roosters	24	17	0	7	2	680	445	+235	38
3	Canterbury-Bankstown Bulldogs	24	16	0	8	2	702	419	+283	36
4	Canberra Raiders	24	16	0	8	2	620	463	+157	36
5	Melbourne Storm	24	15	0	9	2	564	486	+78	34
6	New Zealand Warriors	24	15	0	9	2	545	510	+35	34
7	Newcastle Knights	24	14	0	10	2	632	635	-3	32
8	Brisbane Broncos	24	12	0	12	2	497	464	+33	28
9	Parramatta Eels	24	11	0	13	2	570	582	-12	26
10	St George Illawarra Dragons	24	11	0	13	2	548	593	-45	26
11	North Queensland Cowboys	24	10	0	14	2	606	629	-23	24
12	Cronulla-Sutherland Sharks	24	8	0	16	2	497	704	-207	20
13	Wests Tigers	24	7	0	17	2	470	598	-128	18
14	Manly-Warringah Sea Eagles	24	7	0	17	2	557	791	-234	18
15	South Sydney Rabbitohs	24	3	0	21	2	457	758	-301	10

== Awards ==
- Michael Cronin clubman of the year award: Dean Widders
- Ken Thornett Medal (Players' player): Daniel Wagon
- Jack Gibson Award (Coach's award): John Morris
- Eric Grothe Rookie of the Year Award: Michael Witt
