= 2003 New Zealand Warriors season =

- NRL rank: 6th
- 2003 record: Wins: 15; draws: 0; losses: 9
- Points scored: For: 545; against: 510

Team information
- CEO: Mick Watson
- Coach: Daniel Anderson
- Assistant coach: Tony Kemp
- Captains: Monty Betham; Stacey Jones Awen Guttenbeil
- Stadium: Ericsson Stadium
- Avg. attendance: 16,842

Top scorers
- Tries: Francis Meli (23)
- Goals: Stacey Jones (29)
- Points: Francis Meli (92)
← 2002	2004 →

The 2003 New Zealand Warriors season was the 9th in the club's history. They competed in the National Rugby League's 2003 Telstra Premiership and finished the regular season in 6th place. The Warriors then came within one game of the grand final, losing to eventual premiers the Penrith Panthers. The coach of the team was Daniel Anderson while Monty Betham was the club captain.

== Milestones ==
- The Warriors had the youngest squad out of all the 15 clubs in the 2003 NRL season.
- 23 March — Round 2: Monty Betham played in his 50th match for the club.
- 6 April — Round 4: Francis Meli, Wairangi Koopu and Mark Tookey played in their 50th first grade games for the club.
- 22 June — Round 13: Motu Tony played in his 50th match for the club.
- 12 July — Round 18: Ali Lauitiiti played in his 100th match for the club.
- 10 August — Round 22: Richard Villasanti played in his 50th match for the club.
- 6 September — Round 26: Awen Guttenbiel played in his 100th match for the club.

== Jersey and sponsors ==

The Warriors launched a new jersey design in 2003, finally removing completely the blue and white colours the owners had inherited when the purchased the company.

== Fixtures ==
The Warriors used Ericsson Stadium as their home ground in 2003, their only home ground since they entered the competition in 1995.

=== Pre-season ===
The Warriors played a pre-season trial match against the Penrith Panthers in Invercargill on 28 February. 15,000 fans attended the match, which was sold out.

=== Regular season ===
Date	Round	Opponent	Venue	Result	Score	Tries	Goals	Attendance	Report
16 March	Round 1	Newcastle Knights	Mount Smart Stadium, Auckland	Loss	26-36	Hohaia (2), Carlaw, Fa'afili, Meli	Jones (3)	16,291	
23 March	Round 2	Canterbury Bulldogs	Mount Smart Stadium, Auckland	Win	24-20	Hohaia (2), Fa'afili, Guttenbeil, Meli	Marsh (2)	16,229	
29 March	Round 3	Manly-Warringah Sea Eagles	Brookvale Oval, Sydney	Win	20-16	Toopi (2), Fa'afili, Swann	Marsh (2)	14,273	
6 April	Round 4	South Sydney Rabbitohs	Mount Smart Stadium, Auckland	Win	38-16	Fa'afili (2), Hohaia (2), Meli (2), Seuseu, Tony	Marsh (2), Hohaia (1)	13,614	
13 April	Round 5	Brisbane Broncos	ANZ Stadium, Brisbane	Win	32-12	Meli (2), Faumuina, Marsh, Swann, Tuimavave	Marsh (3), Tuimavave (1)	18,959	
21 April	Round 6	North Queensland Cowboys	Mount Smart Stadium, Auckland	Win	30-24	Fa'afili, Jones, Marsh, Meli, Tony, Toopi	Marshs (3)	19,722	
27 April	Round 7	Penrith Panthers	Mount Smart Stadium, Auckland	Loss	14-28	Fa'afili, Koopu, Tony	Jones (1)	15,732	
2 May	Round 8	Bulldogs	Westpac Stadium, Wellington	Loss	12-18	Meli, Toopi	Webb (2)	21,989	
10 May	Round 9	Parramatta Eels	Mount Smart Stadium, Auckland	Win	18-16	Meli (2), Marsh, Swann	Webb (1)	15,397	
	Round 10	Bye							
23 May	Round 11	Canberra Raiders	Westpac Stadium, Wellington	Loss	10-18	Fa'afili	Webb (1)	13,130	
31 May	Round 12	Penrith Panthers	CUA Stadium, Sydney	Loss	12-34	Betham, Tony	Jones (2)	20,280	
7 June	Round 13	Cronulla-Sutherland Sharks	Mount Smart Stadium, Auckland	Win	23-6	Faumuina, Jones, Meli, Mellars	Jones (3 & FG)	16,172	
14 June	Round 14	Parramatta Eels	Parramatta Stadium, Sydney	Loss	26-28	V.Anderson, Betham, Faumuina, Meli, Webb	Jones (2), Webb (1)	8,076	
22 June	Round 15	Canberra Raiders	Mount Smart Stadium, Auckland	Win	26-18	Swann (2), Tony, Toopi, Villasanti	Jones (3)	18,375	
29 June	Round 16	South Sydney Rabbitohs	Sydney Football Stadium, Sydney	Win	31-30 (a.e.t)	Jones, Meli, Tony, Toopi, Webb	Jones (5 & FG)	9,109	
5 July	Round 17	North Queensland Cowboys	Dairy Farmers Stadium, Townsville	Loss	10-30	Swann (2)	Jones (1)	16,028	
12 July	Round 18	Manly-Warringah Sea Eagles	Mount Smart Stadium, Auckland	Win	20-12	V.Anderson, Latu, Webb	Jones (4)	15,528	
19 July	Round 19	Cronulla-Sutherland Sharks	Toyota Park, Sydney	Win	31-24	Toopi (2), Murphy, Villasanti, Webb	Jones (5 & FG)	13,565	
	Round 20	Bye							
2 August	Round 21	Melbourne Storm	Mount Smart Stadium, Auckland	Loss	12-14	V.Anderson, Toopi	Hohaia (2)	15,207	
10 August	Round 22	St. George Illawarra Dragons	Oki Jubilee Stadium, Sydney	Win	30-20	Carlaw, Hohaia, Lauiti'iti, Leuluai, Villasanti, Webb	Hohaia (3)	12,595	
15 August	Round 23	Newcastle Knights	EnergyAustralia Stadium, Newcastle	Loss	20-36	Toopi (2), Meli, Villasanti	Hohaia (2)	17,198	
24 August	Round 24	Brisbane Broncos	Mount Smart Stadium, Auckland	Win	22-14	V.Anderson, Faumuina, Latu, Meli	Webb (3)	19,439	
31 August	Round 25	Sydney Roosters	Sydney Football Stadium, Sydney	Win	26-24	Meli (2), Toopi, Villasanti	Webb (5)	18,726	
6 September	Round 26	Wests Tigers	Mount Smart Stadium, Auckland	Win	32-16	Toopi (3), V.Anderson (2), Meli	Webb (4)	20,392	

=== Final Series ===
Date	Round	Opponent	Venue	Result	Score	Tries	Goals	Attendance	Report
13 September	Qualifying Final	Bulldogs	Showgrounds, Sydney	Win	48 - 22	Meli (5), Webb (2), Faumuina, Tony	Webb (5), Faumuina (1)	18,312	
20 September	Preliminary Final	Canberra Raiders	Sydney Football Stadium, Sydney	Win	17 - 16	Fa'afili, Swann, Toopi	Webb (2), Jones (FG)	31,616	
28 September	Preliminary Final	Penrith Panthers	Telstra Stadium, Sydney	Loss	20 - 28	Swann, Toopi, Villasanti, Webb	Webb (2)	43,174	

== Ladder ==
2003 NRL season
Pos	Team	Pld	W	D	L	B	PF	PA	PD	Pts
1	Penrith Panthers (P)	24	18	0	6	2	659	527	+132	40
2	Sydney Roosters	24	17	0	7	2	680	445	+235	38
3	Canterbury-Bankstown Bulldogs	24	16	0	8	2	702	419	+283	36
4	Canberra Raiders	24	16	0	8	2	620	463	+157	36
5	Melbourne Storm	24	15	0	9	2	564	486	+78	34
6	New Zealand Warriors	24	15	0	9	2	545	510	+35	34
7	Newcastle Knights	24	14	0	10	2	632	635	-3	32
8	Brisbane Broncos	24	12	0	12	2	497	464	+33	28
9	Parramatta Eels	24	11	0	13	2	570	582	-12	26
10	St George Illawarra Dragons	24	11	0	13	2	548	593	-45	26
11	North Queensland Cowboys	24	10	0	14	2	606	629	-23	24
12	Cronulla-Sutherland Sharks	24	8	0	16	2	497	704	-207	20
13	Wests Tigers	24	7	0	17	2	470	598	-128	18
14	Manly-Warringah Sea Eagles	24	7	0	17	2	557	791	-234	18
15	South Sydney Rabbitohs	24	3	0	21	2	457	758	-301	10

== Squad ==
Twenty eight players were used by the Warriors in 2003, including five players who made their first grade debuts.

No.	Name	Nationality	Position	Warriors debut	App	T	G	FG	Pts
24	Stacey Jones	(New Zealand)	HB	23 April 1995	22	3	29	4	74
33	Awen Guttenbeil	(New Zealand) / (Tonga)	SR	14 April 1996	20	1	0	0	4
42	Logan Swann	(New Zealand)	SR	1 March 1997	23	9	0	0	36
50	Jerry Seu Seu	(New Zealand) / (Samoa)	PR	16 August 1997	24	1	0	0	4
55	Ali Lauitiiti	(New Zealand) / (Samoa)	SR	19 April 1998	12	1	0	0	4
61	Monty Betham	(New Zealand) / (Samoa)	HK / LK	8 March 1999	24	2	0	0	8
64	Wairangi Koopu	(New Zealand)	CE / SR	9 April 1999	25	1	0	0	4
65	Francis Meli	(New Zealand) / (Samoa)	WG	2 May 1999	27	23	0	0	92
66	Clinton Toopi	(New Zealand)	CE	2 May 1999	22	17	0	0	68
76	Mark Tookey	(Australia)	PR	6 February 2000	17	0	0	0	0
81	Henry Fa'afili	(New Zealand) / (Samoa)	WG	26 March 2000	24	10	0	0	40
87	Richard Villasanti	(Australia) / (Tonga)	PR	18 February 2001	16	6	0	0	24
90	Motu Tony	(New Zealand) / (Samoa)	UH	9 March 2001	18	7	0	0	28
92	Justin Murphy	(France)	WG	7 April 2001	8	1	0	0	4
93	Iafeta Paleaaesina	(New Zealand) / (Samoa)	PR	1 June 2001	24	0	0	0	0
95	John Carlaw	(Australia)	CE	24 March 2002	10	2	0	0	8
96	PJ Marsh	(Australia)	HB / HK	24 March 2002	11	3	12	0	36
97	Brent Webb	(New Zealand)	FB	1 April 2002	21	8	26	0	84
98	Sione Faumuina	(New Zealand)	CE / LK	1 April 2002	24	5	1	0	22
99	Lance Hohaia	(New Zealand)	UB	6 April 2002	16	7	8	0	44
100	Vinnie Anderson	(New Zealand) / (Tonga)	CE	7 July 2002	27	6	0	0	24
102	Evarn Tuimavave	(New Zealand)	PR	1 September 2002	9	1	1	0	6
103	Karl Temata	(Cook Islands)	PR / SR	6 September 2002	10	0	0	0	0
104	Mark Robinson	(New Zealand)	HK	2 May 2003	1	0	0	0	0
105	Thomas Leuluai	(New Zealand)	HB	2 May 2003	12	1	0	0	4
106	Vince Mellars	(New Zealand)	CE	7 June 2003	4	1	0	0	4
107	Tevita Latu	(New Zealand) / (Tonga)	HK	7 June 2003	7	2	0	0	8
108	Jerome Ropati	(New Zealand)	CE / FE	31 August 2003	1	0	0	0	0

== Staff ==
- Chief Executive Officer: Mick Watson

=== Coaching staff ===
- Head coach: Daniel Anderson
- Assistant coach: Tony Kemp
- Assistant coach: Rohan Smith

== Transfers ==
=== Gains ===
Player	Previous club	Length	Notes
Mark Robinson	North Harbour Rugby Union		

=== Losses ===
Player	Club	Notes
Jeremiah Pai	Wests Tigers	
Justin Morgan	Toulouse Olympique	
Kevin Campion	North Queensland Cowboys	
Shontayne Hape	Bradford Bulls	
David Myles	North Queensland Cowboys	
Ivan Cleary	Retired	

== Other teams ==
Players not required by the Warriors were released to play in the 2003 Bartercard Cup. This included Motu Tony and Jerome Ropati at the Marist Richmond Brothers, Mark Robinson at the North Harbour Tigers and Richard Villasanti at the Canterbury Bulls.

== Awards ==
Francis Meli won the Player of the Year award.
