= Luke Priddis =

Australia international rugby league footballer

Personal information
- Born: 14 April 1977 (age 49) Dubbo, New South Wales, Australia

Playing information
- Height: 177 cm (5 ft 10 in)
- Weight: 93 kg (14 st 9 lb; 205 lb)
- Position: Hooker
Club
Years	Team	Pld	T	G	FG	P
1997–98	Canberra Raiders	44	11	0	0	44
1999–01	Brisbane Broncos	79	17	0	0	68
2002–08	Penrith Panthers	162	34	0	0	136
2009–10	St. George Illawarra	30	1	0	0	4
	Total	315	63	0	0	252
Representative
Years	Team	Pld	T	G	FG	P
1997	Australia (SL)	1	0	0	0	0
1997	New Sth Wales (SL)	2	0	0	0	0
1998–01	New South Wales	3	0	0	0	0
2005	Prime Minister's XIII	1	1	0	0	4
2005	Australia	1	0	0	0	0
2004–06	Country Origin	2	0	0	0	0

Luke Priddis (born 14 April 1977) is an Australian former professional rugby league footballer. An Australian international and New South Wales State of Origin representative hooker, he played club football in the National Rugby League for the Canberra Raiders, Brisbane Broncos (with whom he won the 2000 NRL Premiership) and Penrith Panthers (with whom he won the 2003 NRL Premiership and Clive Churchill Medal) and, finally, the St. George Illawarra Dragons with who he won the 2010 NRL Premiership.

== Playing career ==
A Woden Valley Rams junior, Priddis started his career with the Canberra Raiders, winning the club's rookie of the year award in his debut season. He was selected to represent New South Wales in the Super League Tri-series and also Australia in the post-season Trans-Tasman Super League test match. He later moved to the Brisbane Broncos and played at hooker in the club's 2000 NRL grand final victory over the Sydney Roosters. Having won the 2000 NRL Premiership, the Broncos traveled to England to play against 2000's Super League V Champions, St Helens R.F.C. for the 2001 World Club Challenge, with Priddis playing at hooker in Brisbane's loss.

Moving to the Penrith Panthers, in the 2003 NRL grand final, Priddis won the Clive Churchill Medal in the 18-6 victory over the Sydney Roosters. He scored one try and set up both other tries for winger Luke Rooney, whilst making 47 tackles. After this match he became the only Panther to have played in two successful Grand Finals, having won with Brisbane in 2000. No hooker had previously won the Clive Churchill Medal since it was instigated in 1986, though one other (Shaun Berrigan, in 2006) has won it since. As 2003 NRL premiers, the Panthers travelled to England to face Super League VIII champions, the Bradford Bulls in the 2004 World Club Challenge. Priddis played at hooker and scored Penrith's sole try in their 22-4 loss.

In 2009, Priddis was re-united with his former coach at the Broncos, Wayne Bennett, after they both transferred to the Dragons.

Despite being advised by Dragons coach Wayne Bennett to retire at the end of the 2009 season, Priddis went on to make his 300th NRL appearance in 2010. While Priddis played a very important role in the team's success after taking over from Nathan Fien, who suffered a broken leg in Round 1 which kept him out most of the season, he did not play in the 2010 NRL Grand Final. By not playing in the Dragons' victorious Grand Final squad, he missed a golden opportunity to have won three Grand Finals at three clubs, a feat not achieved since Glenn Lazarus did so with the Broncos, Canberra Raiders and Melbourne Storm. Priddis retired at the end of the 2010 NRL season.

=== Representative career ===
Priddis played his first cap for Australia in the 1997 super league test series. Priddis made his only appearance for Australia in the 2005 ANZAC Test.

== Personal life ==
Priddis established the Luke Priddis Foundation (LPF) in 2006 after Luke's son, Cooper, was diagnosed with ASD and Luke and his wife, Holly, noticed the lack of services in the western Sydney region.

Preceded by Craig Fitzgibbon (Sydney Roosters)	Clive Churchill Medallist; 2003	Succeeded by Willie Mason (Bulldogs)
