= 2003 Brisbane Broncos season =

Coordinates: 27°27′53″S 153°0′34″E

← 2002	2004 →

The 2003 Brisbane Broncos season was the sixteenth in the history of the Brisbane Broncos. Coached by Wayne Bennett and captained by Gorden Tallis, they competed in the NRL's 2003 Telstra Premiership, finishing the regular season 8th (out of 15) and making the finals for the 12th consecutive year. The Broncos were then knocked out in the first match against eventual premiers, the Penrith Panthers.

== Season summary ==
In the pre-season Bruno Cullen replaced Shane Edwards as Broncos Chief Executive Officer. The Brisbane Broncos had a strong start to the 2003 season, winning 11 of their first 14 games, but later breaking the club's longest losing streak record by losing their last 8 games straight. Brisbane still made it to the finals, finishing the regular season in 8th position, but lost the Qualifying Final to the Penrith Panthers 28-18. The 2003 season was the first in the Broncos' history in which they lost more games than they won. In the first half of the 2003 season, whilst still at ANZ Stadium, the Broncos were only beaten once (by the New Zealand Warriors in round five). However, upon returning to Suncorp Stadium in round 12, the Broncos only won a home match once (defeating the Sydney Roosters in round 16).

A total of twelve Broncos players were selected to play in the mid-season 2003 State of Origin series, making them the most heavily represented club. Also in 2003 the Rugby World Cup was played in Australia. As a testament to the quality of the athletes produced at the Broncos, three of the club's former players would feature in two of the top three finishing teams of the rugby union world's peak competition, all of them having played together in the Broncos' 2000 premiership-winning side: Lote Tuquri with Wendell Sailor for Australia and Brad Thorn for New Zealand.

The Broncos were once again in the upper echelons of the ladder before losing their last eight games and falling to eighth place, nearly missing the finals for the first time since 1991.

Fullback Darren Lockyer was named the Broncos' player of the season.

== Match results ==
Round	Opponent	Result	Bro.	Opp.	Date	Venue	Crowd	Position
1	Penrith Panthers	Win	24	20	16 Mar	Penrith Football Stadium		6/15
2	South Sydney Rabbitohs	Win	22	20	23 Mar	Sydney Football Stadium		4/15
3	Cronulla Sharks	Win	30	4	30 Mar	ANZ Stadium		2/15
4	North Queensland Cowboys	Win	32	24	5 Apr	Dairy Farmers Stadium		2/15
5	New Zealand Warriors	Loss	12	32	13 Apr	ANZ Stadium		4/15
6	Sydney Roosters	Loss	20	27	18 Apr	Sydney Football Stadium		6/15
7	Parramatta Eels	Win	20	14	25 Apr	Parramatta Stadium		5/15
8	Wests Tigers	Win	38	6	4 May	Leichhardt Oval		3/15
9	North Queensland Cowboys	Win	38	12	11 May	ANZ Stadium		2/15
10	Melbourne Storm	Win	36	16	18 May	ANZ Stadium		1/15
11	Canterbury Bulldogs	Win	24	0	23 May	Telstra Stadium		1/15
12	Newcastle Knights	Loss	22	32	1 Jun	Suncorp Stadium		3/15
13	Bye							2/15
14*	Canberra Raiders	Win	24	20	15 Jun	Canberra Stadium		1/15
15	Bye							1/15
16*	Sydney Roosters	Win	10	8	27 Jun	Suncorp Stadium		1/15
17	St George Illawarra Dragons	Loss	16	32	4 Jul	WIN Stadium		1/15
18	Canterbury Bulldogs	Loss	4	40	11 Jul	Suncorp Stadium		3/15
19*	Melbourne Storm	Win	26	22	20 Jul	Olympic Park		3/15
20	Manly Sea Eagles	Loss	20	26	26 Jul	Suncorp Stadium		4/15
21	Cronulla Sharks	Loss	10	20	2 Aug	Toyota Park		5/15
22	Penrith Panthers	Loss	6	13	8 Aug	Suncorp Stadium		5/15
23	Wests Tigers	Loss	10	12	16 Aug	Suncorp Stadium		5/15
24	New Zealand Warriors	Loss	14	22	24 Aug	Ericsson Stadium		7/15
25	Parramatta Eels	Loss	14	16	30 Aug	Suncorp Stadium		8/15
26	St George Illawarra Dragons	Loss	25	26	5 Sep	Suncorp Stadium		8/15
Qualif. Final	Penrith Panthers	Loss	18	28	14 Sep	Penrith Football Stadium		

*Game following a State of Origin match

== Ladder ==
2003 NRL season
Pos	Team	Pld	W	D	L	B	PF	PA	PD	Pts
1	Penrith Panthers (P)	24	18	0	6	2	659	527	+132	40
2	Sydney Roosters	24	17	0	7	2	680	445	+235	38
3	Canterbury-Bankstown Bulldogs	24	16	0	8	2	702	419	+283	36
4	Canberra Raiders	24	16	0	8	2	620	463	+157	36
5	Melbourne Storm	24	15	0	9	2	564	486	+78	34
6	New Zealand Warriors	24	15	0	9	2	545	510	+35	34
7	Newcastle Knights	24	14	0	10	2	632	635	-3	32
8	Brisbane Broncos	24	12	0	12	2	497	464	+33	28
9	Parramatta Eels	24	11	0	13	2	570	582	-12	26
10	St George Illawarra Dragons	24	11	0	13	2	548	593	-45	26
11	North Queensland Cowboys	24	10	0	14	2	606	629	-23	24
12	Cronulla-Sutherland Sharks	24	8	0	16	2	497	704	-207	20
13	Wests Tigers	24	7	0	17	2	470	598	-128	18
14	Manly-Warringah Sea Eagles	24	7	0	17	2	557	791	-234	18
15	South Sydney Rabbitohs	24	3	0	21	2	457	758	-301	10

== Scorers ==
Player	Tries	Goals	FG	Points
Michael De Vere	12	69/97	0	186
Darren Lockyer	9	2/3	1	41
Shaun Berrigan	10	0	0	40
Brent Tate	9	0	0	36
Stuart Kelly	8	0	0	32
Casey McGuire	8	0	0	32
Tonie Carroll	6	0	0	24
Dane Carlaw	5	0	0	20
Scott Minto	5	0	0	20
Ben Ikin	4	0	0	16
Gorden Tallis	4	0	0	16
Petero Civoniceva	3	0	0	12
Craig Frawley	3	0	0	12
Corey Parker	3	0	0	12
Richard Swain	0	2/3	0	4
Neale Wyatt	1	0	0	4
Shane Webcke	1	0	0	4
Carl Webb	1	0	0	4
Scott Prince*	0	0/1	0	0

(*Did not technically score any points.)

== Honours ==
=== League ===
- Nil

=== Club ===
- Player of the year: Darren Lockyer
- Rookie of the year: Neville Costigan
- Back of the year: Darren Lockyer
- Forward of the year: Shane Webcke
- Club man of the year: Graham McColm
