= 2003 NRL Grand Final =

Final match in Australian football competition

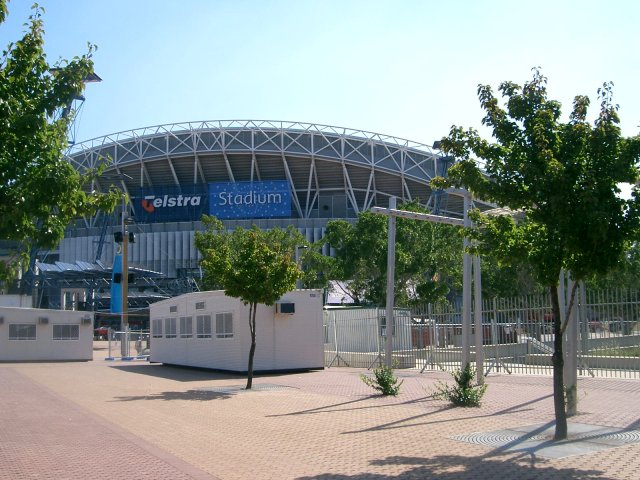
- Telstra Stadium, where the match was played

Penrith Panthers	Sydney Roosters
18	6
	1	2	Total
PEN	6	12	18
SYD	0	6	6
- Date: 5 October 2003
- Stadium: Telstra Stadium
- Location: Sydney, Australia
- Clive Churchill Medal: Luke Priddis (PEN)
- Australian National anthem: Troy Cassar-Daley
- Referee: Bill Harrigan
- Attendance: 81,166

Broadcast partners
- Broadcasters: Nine Network
- Commentators: Ken Sutcliffe (host); Ray Warren; Peter Sterling; Paul Vautin; Andrew Voss (sideline)

The 2003 NRL Grand Final was the conclusive and premiership-deciding match of the 2003 NRL season. In a contest of Sydney's east versus west, defending premiers the Sydney Roosters played against minor premiers the Penrith Panthers. The first grand final since 1996 to feature two Sydney-based teams was played on the night of Sunday, 5 October at Telstra Stadium in the inner western suburb of Sydney Olympic Park. Domestically, live free-to-air television coverage was provided by Nine's Wide World of Sports. The match was also broadcast live in the United States by Fox Soccer.

== Background ==
The 2003 NRL season was the 96th season of professional rugby league football in Australia and the sixth run by the National Rugby League. Fifteen teams (14 from Australia and 1 from New Zealand) competed for the Telstra Premiership, with the top eight teams entering a play-off finals series to determine the grand finalists.

=== Penrith Panthers ===
The 2003 Penrith Panthers season was the 37th in the club's history. Coached by John Lang and captained by Craig Gower, they finished the regular season in 1st place.

=== Sydney Roosters ===
The 2003 Sydney Roosters season was the 96th in the club's history. Coached by Ricky Stuart and captained by Brad Fittler, they finished the regular season in 2nd place.

== Teams ==
Of all the Penrith players, only Luke Priddis had grand final experience, having played for the Brisbane Broncos in the 2000 NRL season's decider. It was Scott Sattler's last game with Penrith, having signed with the Wests Tigers for the following season.

Team details
Penrith Panthers		Position	Sydney Roosters
Name	Number	Position	Number	Name
Rhys Wesser	1	Fullback	1	Anthony Minichiello
Luke Lewis	2	Wing	2	Todd Byrne
Ryan Girdler	3	Centre	3	Ryan Cross
Paul Whatuira	4	Centre	4	Shannon Hegarty
Luke Rooney	5	Wing	5	Chris Walker
Preston Campbell	6	Five eighth	6	Brad Fittler (c)
Craig Gower (c)	7	Half back	9	Craig Wing
Joel Clinton	8	Prop forward	8	Jason Cayless
Luke Priddis	9	Hooker	14	Michael Crocker
Martin Lang	10	Prop forward	10	Ned Catic
Joe Galuvao	11	Second row	11	Adrian Morley
Tony Puletua	12	Second row	12	Craig Fitzgibbon
Scott Sattler	13	Lock forward	13	Luke Ricketson
Ben Ross	14	Interchange	7	Brett Finch
Trent Waterhouse	15	Interchange	15	Andrew Lomu
Shane Rodney	16	Interchange	16	Chad Robinson
Luke Swain	17	Interchange	17	Chris Flannery
John Lang		Coach		Ricky Stuart
RLP

== Match details ==
The Roosters were seen as favourites. 81,166 spectators turned out at Telstra Stadium for the game. Pre-match entertainment featured performances by Meat Loaf, the Hoodoo Gurus and American Idol winner Kelly Clarkson. Troy Cassar-Daley then sang the Australian national anthem just before Bill Harrigan, refereeing his 7th consecutive grand final and 10th overall, blew time-on and the Roosters kicked off.

=== First half ===
Rain started falling only a few minutes into the match and continued throughout. After thirty minutes of play, the Roosters' defence was the first to give when Penrith hooker Luke Priddis, still within his team's side of the field, ran from dummy half and into open space, finally passing to winger Luke Rooney coming through in support to cross untouched on the left for the opening try. Ryan Girdler kicked the conversion so the Penrith side were leading 6–0. No more points were scored for the rest of the half so this remained the score at the break.

=== Second half ===
In the eighth minute, and after repeat sets of six had brought the Sydney Roosters close to Penrith's try-line, forward Jason Cayless crossed it beneath the uprights, but the ball was held up by the defence. On the very next play, the ball went through the hands out to Shannon Hegarty to score on the left hand side of the field. Craig Fitzgibbon's conversion, which bounced through off an upright, evened the scores at 6–6. Eight minutes later Sydney winger Todd Byrne received the ball on his own forty-metre line and ran into open space along the left edge of the field. Penrith lock forward Scott Sattler was chasing and twenty metres from the try-line tackled Byrne, pulling him out of the field in what would become one of the most famous plays in grand final history. In the sixty-sixth minute the Penrith side had made their way up to within five metres of the Roosters' try line where Luke Priddis again ran from dummy half and scored, stretching out of the tackle to touch down beside the uprights. Preston Campbell kicked the extra two points so Penrith were now leading 12–6. In the seventy-third minute, Penrith halfback Craig Gower attempted a field goal but it was charged down. Penrith re-gathered the ball and continued towards the Sydney Roosters line and four tackles later had reached perfect field-goal kicking position. Priddis, at dummy half again, instead decided to dummy and run left, throwing a long cut-out pass to Rooney on the wing to score untouched in the corner. Campbell converted the try and Penrith lead 18–6 with six minutes left to play, but no further points ensued so this remained the score at full-time.

Luke Priddis was awarded the Clive Churchill Medal as man-of-the-match before the Prime Minister of Australia John Howard presented Panthers captain Craig Gower with the premiership trophy. At the Penrith Leagues club approximately 10,000 people celebrated the victory with the Panthers. The grand final attracted a bigger audience in Melbourne than the AFL grand final did in Sydney the previous weekend.

== Match summary ==
2003 NRL Grand Final

Sunday, 5 October
19:05 AEST (UTC+10)

Penrith Panthers	18 – 6	Sydney Roosters
Tries: 3 Rooney 31', 73'; Priddis 66'; Goals: 3 Campbell 66', 74' (2/2); Girdler 32' (1/1); Field goals: Gower (0/1)	1st: 6–0; 2nd: 12–6; Report	Tries: 1 Hegarty 48'; Goals: 1 Fitzgibbon 50' (1/1)

Telstra Stadium, Sydney
Attendance: 81,166
Referee: Bill Harrigan
Touch judges: Steve Carrall, Glyn Henderson
Clive Churchill Medal: Luke Priddis (Penrith)

== Aftermath ==
Four members of Penrith's premiership winning team subsequently went on to play in other premiership teams – Paul Whatuira was part of the Wests Tigers team that triumphed just two years later in 2005, Joe Galuvao and Shane Rodney won a second premiership together as part of the Manly-Warringah Sea Eagles team that won in 2011, and Luke Lewis was part of the Cronulla-Sutherland Sharks team that won their first premiership in 2016, winning the Clive Churchill Medal as the best-on-ground.

== World Club Challenge ==
Having won the premiership, the Penrith Panthers travelled to England the following February to play the Bradford Bulls, winners of the 2003 Super League Grand Final in the World Club Challenge. The Bradford Bulls won 22 to 4.
