= Ronald Prince =

Australian rugby league footballer

Personal information
- Born: 13 February 1979 (age 47)

Playing information
- Position: Wing
Club
Years	Team	Pld	T	G	FG	P
2000–01	Cronulla Sharks	13	4	1	0	18
2003–04	Parramatta Eels	5	1	0	0	4
	Total	18	5	1	0	22

Ronald Prince (born 13 February 1979) is an Australian former professional rugby league footballer who played for the Cronulla-Sutherland Sharks and the Parramatta Eels in the NRL.

== Playing career ==
Prince made his NRL debut for Cronulla in round 14 of the 2000 NRL season in a 28–8 victory over the Northern Eagles. In 2003, Prince joined Parramatta and played five games for them over two seasons. In round 4 of the 2004 NRL season, Prince suffered a season ending knee injury against Canberra. This would prove to be the last NRL game Prince would play in.
