= Craig Gower =

Australia international rugby league and Italy international rugby union footballer

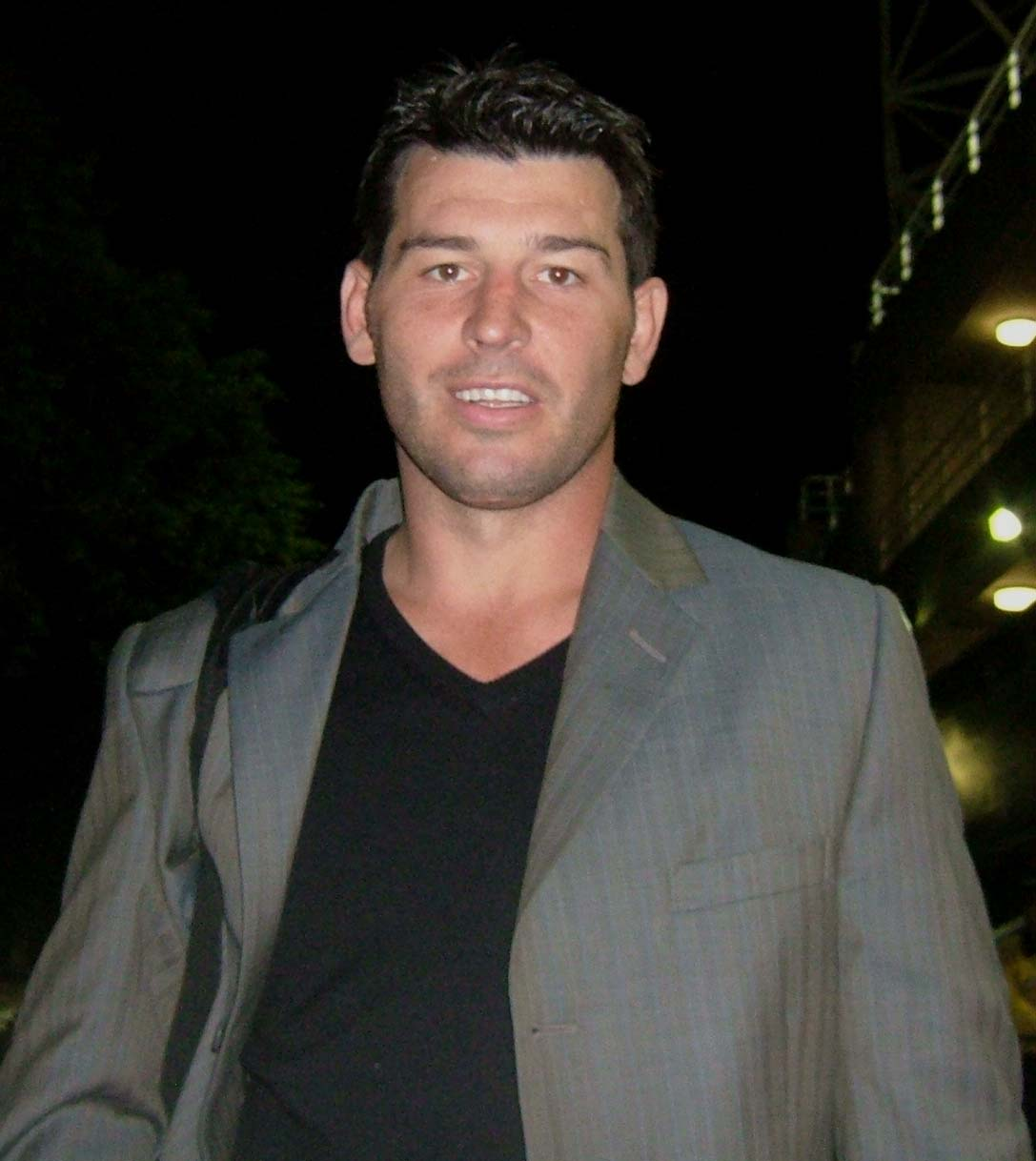
- Gower in 2005

Personal information
- Born: 29 April 1978 (age 48) Penrith, New South Wales, Australia

Playing information
- Height: 174 cm (5 ft 9 in)
- Weight: 89 kg (14 st 0 lb)

Rugby league
- Position: Halfback, Hooker
Club
Years	Team	Pld	T	G	FG	P
1996–07	Penrith Panthers	238	55	4	5	233
2012–13	London Broncos	45	7	27	0	82
2013	Newcastle Knights	6	1	0	0	4
	Total	289	63	31	5	319
Representative
Years	Team	Pld	T	G	FG	P
1997	New South Wales (SL)	2	0	0	0	0
1997	Australia (SL)	5	3	0	0	12
1999–05	Australia	18	5	0	0	20
2005	Prime Minister's XIII	1	0	0	0	0
1999–06	New South Wales	6	0	0	0	0
2002–07	NSW City	5	0	0	0	0

Rugby union
- Position: Fly-half
Club
Years	Team	Pld	T	G	FG	P
2008–11	Aviron Bayonnais	74	7	9	4	71
Representative
Years	Team	Pld	T	G	FG	P
2009–11	Italy	14	0	6	0	17

Craig Gower (born 29 April 1978) is an Italian-Australian former professional rugby league and rugby union footballer who played in the 1990s, 2000s and 2010s. He is a dual-code rugby international, having played rugby league for Australia and rugby union for Italy. A New South Wales State of Origin and Australian Kangaroos representative halfback or hooker, he played in the National Rugby League for Sydney club the Penrith Panthers (whom he captained to victory in the 2003 NRL Premiership). Gower then switched rugby union, playing for French Top 14 side Bayonne, and through grandparentage represented Italy. He returned to rugby league with the London Broncos in the Super League and then finished his playing career with one more National Rugby League season at the Newcastle Knights.

== Early life ==
Gower was born in Penrith, New South Wales, Australia. He is of Italian descent.

Gower was educated at MacCarthy Catholic College, Emu Plains. He played his junior football for the Colyton Colts before being signed by the Penrith Panthers.

== Rugby league career ==
In Round 11 of the 1996 ARL season Gower made his ARL début for the Panthers against the Gold Coast Chargers. Gower made his representative début in his second season in first-grade when still aged only eighteen. He was selected in the Australian Super League side for the ANZAC Test against New Zealand in 1997. He appeared in both Super League Tests against New Zealand and made the end of year Super League tour to Great Britain, playing in all three Tests in England at halfback. Following the re-unification of Australian rugby league, Gower debuted for New South Wales in the 1999 State of Origin series. He was selected for the ANZAC Test that year but was dismissed following a disciplinary incident. However he was selected for the Australian team to compete in the end of season 1999 Rugby League Tri-Nations tournament. In the final against New Zealand he played at hooker in the Kangaroos' 22–20 victory.

In 2000, Gower won the Hooker of the Year award at the 2000 Dally M Awards. In 2002, Gower debuted for the City Origin team in the annual City vs Country Origin clash. Between 2002 and 2005, Gower captained the Panthers, the highlight of which was the 2003 NRL Grand Final victory over the Sydney Roosters. After that Gower was selected to go on the 2003 Kangaroo tour. As 2003 NRL premiers, the Panthers travelled to England to face Super League VIII champions, the Bradford Bulls in the 2004 World Club Challenge. Gower captained the Panthers at half back in their 22–4 loss. Gower was named Australia's captain for the Test match against France on the 2005 Tri-Nations tour. Gower became the second Penrith Panthers player to captain his country, after Brad Fittler in 1995.

In 2006, Gower married Penrith Panthers cheerleader Amanda Flynn. In 2007, Gower's last year at the Panthers, he ended the season with 238 career matches for the Panthers, four games short of the club record of 242 held by Steve Carter.

== Rugby union career ==
On 26 June 2007, Gower switched codes by signing with French Top 14 rugby union side Bayonne, having two years still to run on his contract at the Panthers.

In 2008, Gower expressed his desire to play rugby union for Italy. He qualified for the 'Azzurri' due to his Italian grandfather. On 13 June 2009, Gower made his first appearance for Italy at fly-half against Australia after being selected for the mid-season tour of Australia and New Zealand. Italy coach Nick Mallett had initial reservations about selecting Gower.

== Return to rugby league ==
Following the expiry of his union contract, Gower returned to rugby league, signing a 2-year contract with the London Broncos of the Super League starting in 2012.

As a result, he did not feature in Italy's 2011 Rugby World Cup campaign, and was instead selected in the Italy rugby league squad for the 2013 Rugby League World Cup qualifying tournament, although he missed all three matches due to injury. On 14 November 2012, Gower extended his Broncos contract by a year, making him a Bronco until the end of 2014. He was then named captain, although he stood down as captain in May.

In June 2013, Gower gained a release from his Broncos contract to return to Australia and negotiate a contract with National Rugby League club the Newcastle Knights. On 8 June 2013, Gower signed a contract with the Knights for the remainder of the 2013 NRL season.

Gower was named in the Italy squad for the 2013 Rugby League World Cup. However he did not play due to the injury he suffered at the end of the 2013 NRL season.

At the end of the 2013 NRL season, Gower announced his retirement due to injury.

On 25 June 2016, Gower was inducted into the Penrith Panthers hall of fame alongside Grahame Moran, Royce Simmons, and Greg Alexander.

== Controversies ==
Gower has been involved in a number of alcohol-related off-field incidents. In 1999, Gower exposed himself to a female Irish tourist in a Coogee bar, blaming his behaviour on alcohol intoxication. He was dumped from the squad and fined A$2,500 by the NRL and a further A$500 in court after pleading guilty to indecent exposure.

In December 2005, Gower was fired as Panthers captain after incidents at a charity golf event where he argued with several guests, groped the then teenage daughter of former league player Wayne Pearce, chased Mitchell Pearce with a bottle before vomiting on him, streaked nude around the resort, stole and crashed a golf cart, held a butter knife to the throat of a Sydney radio personality before throwing it at resort guests, and engaged in a brawl with resort security before being ejected from the official function and detained by police. He was handed a "final warning" by the National Rugby League and fined A$100,000, with A$90,000 to be paid to an NRL programme encouraging the responsible use of alcohol by league players and $10,000 to replace the destroyed golf cart. Gower was "deeply unhappy" that the Penrith Panthers club did not defend his reputation, and at one stage threatened to "walk" from the club.

Allegedly inebriated with alcohol in a bar at Kings Cross on 11 February 2007, Gower allegedly tried to kiss one man before biting him on the neck and sparking a brawl, and is accused of assaulting another man. The Panthers club controversially reappointed Gower as captain in 2007, claiming the Peppermint Lounge incident was just a media "beat-up". Australian swimmer Dawn Fraser said Gower was unfit to be captain, due to his alleged lewd behaviour at the charity golf event which she attended, and Sarah Maddison, spokesperson for the Women's Electoral Lobby, said "reappointing Craig Gower would send all the wrong messages."

Preceded by Danny Buderus	Australian national rugby league captain 2005-07	Succeeded by Cameron Smith
