= Michael Crocker =

Australia international rugby league footballer

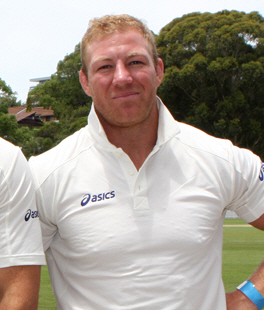

Personal information
- Born: 21 June 1980 (age 46) Auburn, New South Wales, Australia

Playing information
- Height: 185 cm (6 ft 1 in)
- Weight: 100 kg (15 st 10 lb)
- Position: Second-row, Lock, Hooker
Club
Years	Team	Pld	T	G	FG	P
2001–05	Sydney Roosters	92	20	75	0	230
2006–08	Melbourne Storm	44	7	0	0	28
2009–13	South Sydney	68	5	0	0	20
	Total	204	32	75	0	278
Representative
Years	Team	Pld	T	G	FG	P
2011	Prime Minister's XIII	1	0	1	0	2
2003–09	Queensland	13	3	0	0	12
2003–08	Australia	6	1	0	0	4

Michael "Croc" Crocker (born 21 June 1980) is an Australian former professional rugby league footballer who played in the 2000s and 2010s. An Australian international and Queensland State of Origin representative forward, he played his club football in the National Rugby League for the Sydney Roosters, Melbourne Storm and the South Sydney Rabbitohs. Crocker played in 5 Grand Finals during his career, including three consecutive Grand Final appearances between 2002 and 2004, including one victory in 2002.

== Early life ==
Born in Auburn, New South Wales, Crocker was raised in the Sandgate suburb of Brisbane, where he played his junior rugby league for the Norths Devils. At age 16, he moved to the Redcliffe Dolphins before being recruited by Arthur Beetson to sign for the Sydney Roosters. While at Redcliffe, he represented the Queensland under-19 side in 1999.

== Playing career ==
=== Sydney Roosters ===
Having played in the Queensland Cup for the Redcliffe Dolphins, Crocker moved south to make his NRL debut in 2001 for the Sydney Roosters, one of Australia's oldest clubs, and in doing so became the 1,000th footballer to play for them.

Crocker played for the Roosters from the interchange bench in their 2002 NRL Grand final victory over the New Zealand Warriors. Having won the 2002 NRL Premiership, the Roosters travelled to England to play the 2003 World Club Challenge against Super League champions, St Helens R.F.C. Crocker played at hooker in the Roosters’ victorious win over St Helens.

Crocker made his State of Origin debut for the Maroons while playing with the Roosters in 2003. He became the 136th player to represent Queensland in State of Origin and he scored a try on debut in the second match of the 2003 State of Origin series. At the end of that season, Crocker played in the 2003 NRL grand final which the Roosters lost to the Penrith Panthers. He was selected to go on the 2003 Kangaroo tour of Great Britain and France, becoming the 714th player to represent his country in the green and gold, contributing to Australia's victory over Great Britain in what would be the last time the two nations contested an Ashes series.

Crocker played for the Roosters at second-row forward in their 2004 NRL Grand Final loss against cross-Sydney rivals, the Canterbury-Bankstown Bulldogs. Crocker was the last player to touch the ball in the game: trailing 16–13 and with less than seconds left on the game, Crocker appeared to make a break down the right-hand side of the field about 30 metres out from the Bulldogs’ line but lost control of the ball when Andrew Ryan made contact with his arms, dislodging the ball.

In 2005, Crocker was involved in an alcohol-fuelled disturbance outside The Palace Hotel in Sydney. He was arrested and pleaded guilty to affray and fined $10,000 by the Sydney Roosters.

=== Melbourne Storm ===
After signing with the Melbourne Storm in 2006 he became the Storm's lucky charm; in the three years he was with Melbourne, he played in only three losing games, including the Storm's loss to Manly in the 2008 NRL Grand Final.

In the 2006 preliminary final match against the St George Illawarra Dragons Crocker injured his knee, forcing him to miss the Grand Final against the Brisbane Broncos, which Melbourne lost.

He was part of the victorious Melbourne Storm 2007 NRL Grand Final team against Manly-Warringah, although this premiership was later stripped due to a salary cap breach. His contribution to the win, was highlighted when he knocked out Manly fullback Brett Stewart with a ball and all tackle. Chasing a high bomb kicked by Greg Inglis, Crocker pursued the ball to make a tackle on Stewart alongside fellow Storm player Billy Slater. The play resulted in Brett Stewart leaving the field and being sidelined for the rest of the match. Several minutes later, Crocker went on and scored a decisive try.

Crocker's outstanding performance in the Grand Final earned him a position in the 2007 New Zealand v Australia Centenary Test, his first international selection since 2004. The Australian team with Crocker playing went on to win this test match by the biggest margin in history.

His representative career continued throughout all of 2008. Crocker played in all 3 games for Queensland in State of Origin, with Queensland successfully winning the series over New South Wales. He was selected to represent his country again, playing for Australia in the Centenary Test commemorating the 100th anniversary of the first test match between Australia and New Zealand. Australia celebrated a resounding victory winning 28–12 against New Zealand.

Crocker was a member of the Melbourne team which was defeated by the Manly-Warringah Sea Eagles in the 2008 NRL Grand Final.

At the end of the season, Crocker was named in the Australia team for the 2008 Rugby League World Cup, and was due to play but had to withdraw through a rib injury sustained in the grand final.

In an interview with media regarding players for the 2008 World Cup team Australian national coach Ricky Stuart declared English-bound forward Crocker had played his last game for Australia due to his pending defection to English club Hull F.C. However, in August 2008, Crocker was named in the preliminary 46-man Kangaroos squad for the 2008 Rugby League World Cup despite earlier comments by Kangaroos' coach, Ricky Stuart, that he would not select players leaving Australia to play in England in 2009.

Crocker was contracted to Melbourne Storm for the 2009 NRL season but activated a clause in 2008 that allowed him to accept a lucrative contract with English club Hull F.C.

=== South Sydney Rabbitohs ===
Crocker planned to join Super League side Hull F.C. for the 2009 season on a four-year contract. Hull F.C. confirmed they had signed Crocker on a three-year contract from the 2009 season with the club "delighted" with the signing, although a visa application to work in the United Kingdom was rejected, in part due to a 2005 conviction for affray.

The British High Commission rejected Crocker's appeal to be allowed to work in the UK in May 2009, but did not give an official reason. Crocker signed a contract with the South Sydney Rabbitohs for five years, making an immediate start with the club. Crocker's debut came in the round 10 NRL match against the West Tigers on 18 May 2009 played at the Sydney Cricket Ground.

With a knee injury limiting him to three appearances in 2013, Crocker announced his retirement at the end of the 2013 season. Crocker said, "After undergoing surgery in April, my focus has been to get back on the field. Unfortunately, I have arrived at the point where my knee is unable to meet the demands of professional football. It has been an incredible 13 years playing in the NRL and my career has been blessed."

=== Judiciary record ===
Notorious for his tough playing style combined with high and sometimes dangerous tackles, Crocker has missed a number of games through suspension. Between 2001 and 2007, Crocker faced ten judiciary charges, and been suspended for a total of 21 weeks. By 2012, he had faced the NRL Judiciary thirteen times, a record only equalled by Steve Matai.

== Post career ==
Crocker was a contestant on Australian Survivor: Blood V Water under his nickname Croc.

Crocker introduced himself as a dog-man (crane industry) to fellow contestants.
