= Junior Paulo =

Junior Paulo may refer to:

- Junior Paulo (rugby league, born 1983), New Zealand prop and second-row forward
- Junior Paulo (rugby league, born 1993), Samoan prop

== See also ==
- Junior Polu (born 1981), Samoan rugby union player
