= Luke Rooney =

Australian rugby union and rugby league footballer

Personal information
- Born: 16 January 1983 (age 43) Penrith, New South Wales, Australia

Playing information
- Height: 191 cm (6 ft 3 in)
- Weight: 98 kg (15 st 6 lb)

Rugby league
- Position: Wing
Club
Years	Team	Pld	T	G	FG	P
2001–08	Penrith Panthers	140	65	0	0	260
Representative
Years	Team	Pld	T	G	FG	P
2004–08	City NSW	3	1	0	0	4
2004–05	New South Wales	5	3	0	0	12
2004–05	Australia	6	6	0	0	24

Rugby union
- Position: Fullback, Wing, Centre
Club
Years	Team	Pld	T	G	FG	P
2008–10	Toulon	16	5	0	0	25
2010	Hawke's Bay	2	0	0	0	0
2011	Melbourne Rebels	10	3	0	0	0
2011–13	Toulon	24	6	0	0	30
2013–14	Carcassonne	3	6	0	0	0
	Total	55	20	0	0	55

Luke Rooney (born 16 January 1983) is an Australian former professional rugby league and rugby union footballer who played in the 2000s and 2010s. He played rugby league, becoming an Australian international and New South Wales State of Origin representative winger while playing his club football in the NRL for the Penrith Panthers, with whom he won the 2003 NRL Premiership. From 2009, Rooney played rugby union for Toulon, as well as a stint with the Melbourne Rebels in the Super Rugby competition. He ended his career playing for RC Toulonnais in the Top 14 competition.

== Background ==
Born in Penrith, New South Wales on 16 January 1983, Luke Rooney was a junior player of Emu Plains JRLFC. He completed his final year of high school at St Dominic's College, Penrith in 2000.

== Playing career ==
=== Rugby league ===
Rooney made his Penrith Panthers' debut on 21 April for Round 10 of the 2001 NRL season whilst in Year 12 at St.Dominic's College. In the 2003 NRL Grand Final Rooney played on the wing and scored two tries in the Panthers' victory over the Sydney Roosters. As 2003 NRL premiers, the Panthers travelled to England to face Super League VIII champions, the Bradford Bulls in the 2004 World Club Challenge. Rooney played on the wing in the Panthers' 22–4 loss.

Rooney was selected to make his debut for New South Wales in the 2003 State of Origin series, playing in all three games. At the end of the season he played for Australia in the 2004 Rugby League Tri-Nations and was the tournament's top try-scorer.

Rooney was selected to play on the wing in the first two games of the 2005 State of Origin series.

Before his departure from the Panthers and the NRL at the end of 2008, Rooney was part of City Origin, New South Wales and Australian rugby league squads.

=== Rugby union ===
At the end of 2008, Rooney switched to rugby union to play for RC Toulon in the French Top 14 competition. In the 2008–09 Top 14 season he played 16 games and scored 5 tries and also played 6 games in the 2009–10 Amlin Challenge Cup, primarily as a fullback.

In June 2010, Rooney signed a two-year deal with the Melbourne Rebels. At Rebels' arrangement Rooney traveled to New Zealand in July to gain experience with Hawkes Bay in the NZ national provincial competition. However, he played only two games before being sidelined with a groin injury.

Rooney's parents are English and he holds a British passport. In March 2010, while in negotiations with English club Worcester Warriors, he expressed ambitions to play for England in the 2011 Rugby World Cup. He said he wants to play his very best rugby for the Rebels, but, "After that, who knows?" He added: "Of course it would be great to play for the Wallabies but I've got so much work to do before I can think of getting there." In 2011 he rejoined Toulon.
