= Preston Campbell =

Australian rugby league footballer (born 1977)

Preston Campbell OAM
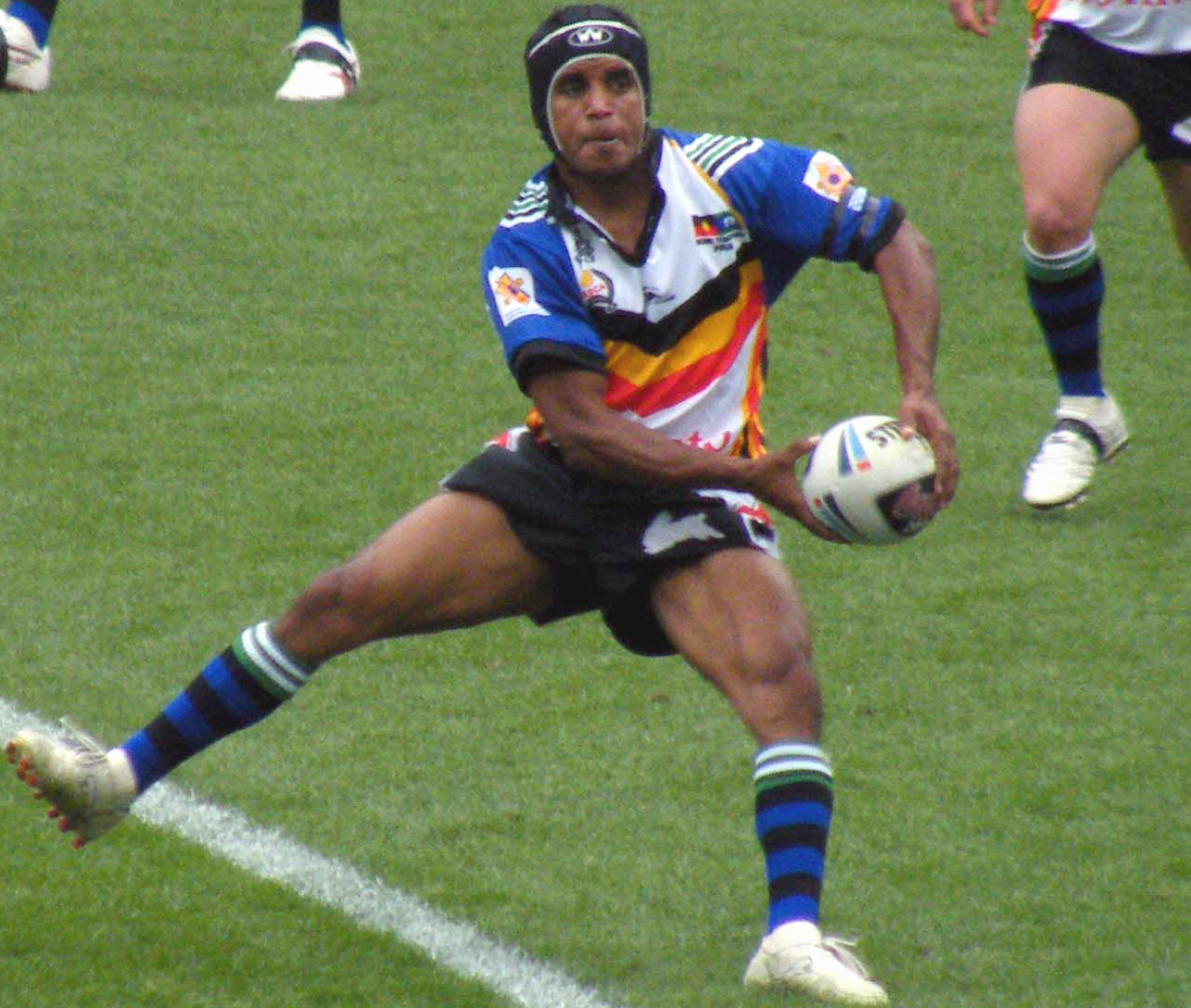
- Campbell playing in 2008

Personal information
- Full name: Thomas Leon Preston Campbell
- Born: 7 June 1977 (age 49) Inverell, New South Wales, Australia

Playing information
- Height: 167 cm (5 ft 6 in)
- Weight: 73 kg (11 st 7 lb)
- Position: Five-eighth, Fullback, Halfback, Wing
Club
Years	Team	Pld	T	G	FG	P
1998	Gold Coast Chargers	14	4	0	0	16
1999–02	Cronulla Sharks	54	24	24	0	144
2003–06	Penrith Panthers	96	43	220	1	613
2007–11	Gold Coast Titans	103	15	35	0	130
	Total	267	86	279	1	903
Representative
Years	Team	Pld	T	G	FG	P
2005–07	NSW Country	3	0	0	0	0
2008	Dreamtime Team	1	0	0	0	0
2010	Indigenous All Stars	1	0	0	0	0
- Relatives: Jayden Campbell (son); Nathan Blacklock (cousin); Greg Inglis (cousin)

Thomas Leon Preston Campbell OAM (born 7 June 1977) is an Australian former professional rugby league footballer who played as a five-eighth or fullback in the National Rugby League (NRL) for the Gold Coast Chargers, Cronulla-Sutherland Sharks, Penrith Panthers (with whom he won the 2003 NRL premiership), and Gold Coast Titans. He was also a New South Wales Country, Dreamtime Team and Indigenous All Stars representative. He is considered to be one of the best players to never play State of Origin (Excluding those ineligible)

== Playing career ==
=== Early career ===
Campbell was born in Inverell, New South Wales, and started his rugby league career with the Inverell Hawks junior club. He made his NRL debut with the Gold Coast Chargers in 1998 as a fullback. The Chargers were disbanded at the end of the season.

=== Cronulla-Sutherland Sharks ===
Preston moved on to play for the Cronulla-Sutherland Sharks in 1999. He spent the first two seasons biding his time in reserve grade and occasionally filling in for injuries in first grade. It was in 2001 that he showed what he was capable of with his feats as a replacement fullback for the injured David Peachey. His electrifying speed and side-step combined with his diminutive stature and humility quickly endeared him to Cronulla fans.

It was expected by some that he would eventually return to the lower grades until he was needed again but coach John Lang had other ideas. Clearly Campbell was too talented to be wasted playing in reserve grade. With the return of David Peachey, he was no longer needed at fullback and Cronulla was struggling without a recognised halfback. Finding the solution to two problems Lang pencilled in Campbell for the halfback role. Combining with David Peachey and pivot Adam Dykes, the trio formed a devastating combination on the field as Cronulla pushed forward and made a serious bid for its 2001 finals campaign including one memorable game when Premiership favourites the Newcastle Knights were soundly beaten by the Sharks.

At the end of 2001, Preston Campbell was awarded the Dally M Player of the Year, beating Andrew Johns, the Newcastle Knights captain, by one point and became Cronulla's third Dally M medallist.

In 2002, with the arrival of new coach Chris Anderson and former Test halfback Brett Kimmorley at the club, he was overlooked for his preferred halfback role in place of Kimmorley. He was instead moved to the unfamiliar position of hooker. After several disastrous games and seemingly very little interest in playing, he was dropped to reserve grade and, stating his desire to return to the position he had made his own, requested a release from Cronulla which was eventually granted in early August 2002.

=== Penrith Panthers ===
On 7 August 2002, it was announced that Campbell had agreed to terms with the Penrith Panthers (then under the guidance of his former mentor, John Lang) for a three-year term. Although Campbell had been given no guarantees on which position he would play, he said that he was looking forward to playing under John Lang once more.

In his first season with the Penrith Panthers in 2003, and in his previous role at halfback/five-eighth, he proved to be a great asset to the team, playing every minute of every match for the entire season.

Campbell played at five-eighth in the 2003 NRL grand final-winning Panthers team, kicking two goals. As 2003 NRL premiers, the Panthers travelled to England to face Super League VIII champions, the Bradford Bulls in the 2004 World Club Challenge. Campbell played at five-eighth, missing his sole goal kick in the Panthers' 22–4 loss.

=== Gold Coast Titans ===
In 2005, with two seasons still to play with the Panthers, Campbell was the inaugural signing for the newly admitted NRL club, Gold Coast Titans. Campbell signed a three-year contract which commenced in 2007. Due to injury to other players such as Chris Walker, Campbell spent much of the 2007 season at fullback.

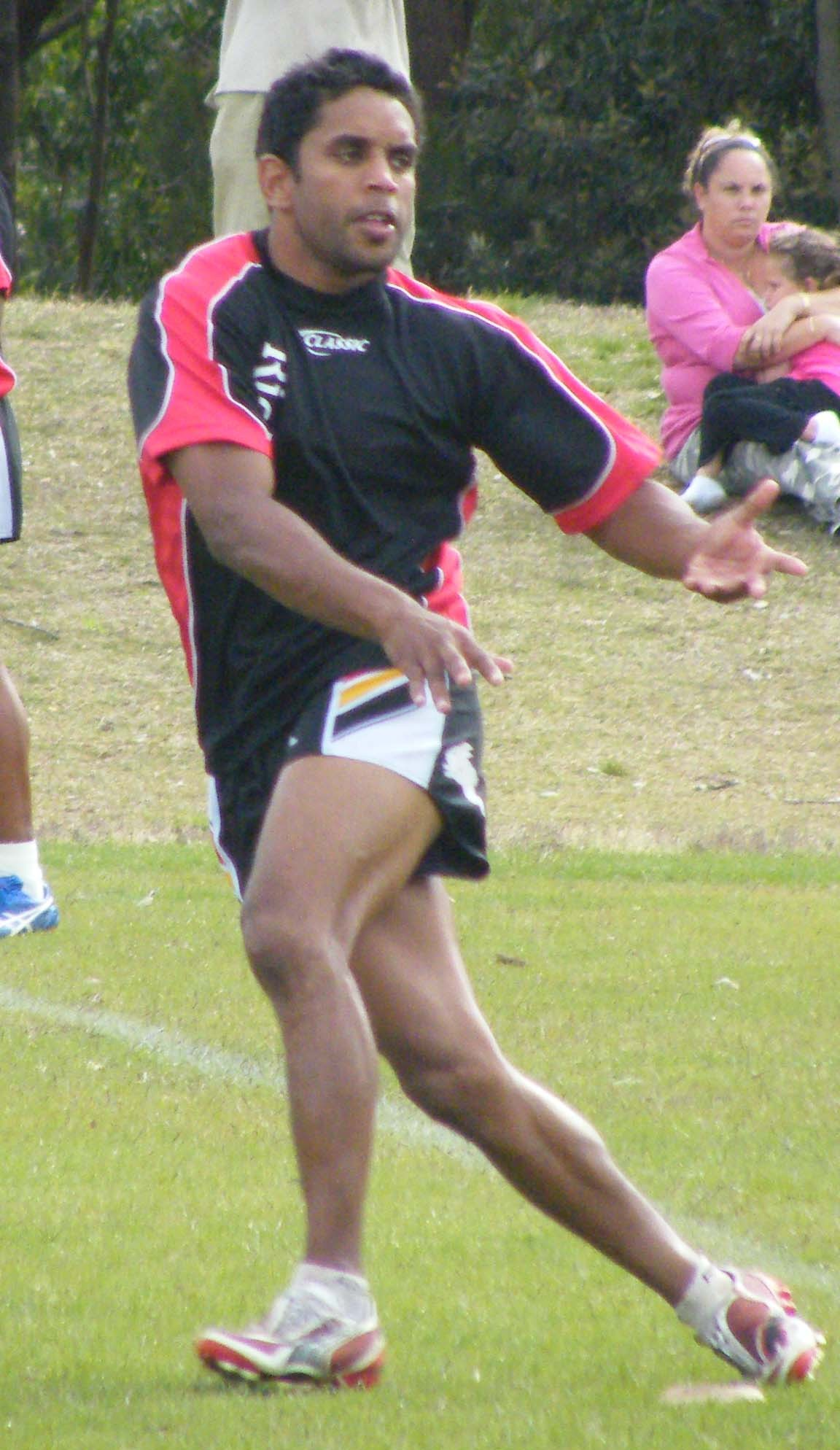
Training with the Aboriginal Dreamtime Team, 2008

Campbell had been playing well during the 2007 season and started the 2008 season in good form. He extended his contract with the Titans. He was named the 2008 Gold Coast Titans player of the year for his consistent and inspiring performances throughout the year. In 2009 he played halfback, five-eighth and fullback due to the injuries to players such as Scott Prince and Mat Rogers.

Campbell retired at the end of the 2011 season, and was honoured as the first life member of the Titans in 2019.

== Accolades ==
In November 2008, Campbell was awarded the Ken Stephen Medal by the NRL at the One Community Awards for his tireless work with Indigenous communities. The award is given for outstanding service to the game, on and off the field.

In 2023, Campbell was awarded the Medal of the Order of Australia (OAM) for his services to rugby league.

== Personal life ==
Campbell is a cousin of Nathan Blacklock and Greg Inglis. His son, Jayden, plays as a fullback for the Gold Coast Titans.
