= Dale Newton =

Australian rugby league footballer

Personal information
- Full name: Dale Newton
- Born: 19 February 1983 (age 43) Sydney, New South Wales, Australia

Playing information
- Position: Prop
Club
Years	Team	Pld	T	G	FG	P
2003	Cronulla-Sutherland	4	0	0	0	0
2006	South Sydney	1	0	0	0	0
	Total	5	0	0	0	0

Dale Newton (born 19 February 1983) is an Australian former professional rugby league footballer who played for the Cronulla-Sutherland Sharks and the South Sydney Rabbitohs in the National Rugby League between 2003 and 2006. He played at Prop.
