= Steven Crouch =

Australian rugby league footballer

Personal information
- Born: 24 December 1977 (age 47); Sydney, New South Wales, Australia

Playing information
- Position: Second-row
Club
Years	Team	Pld	T	G	FG	P
1996	Parramatta Eels	1	0	0	0	0
1999	Manly Sea Eagles	10	0	0	0	0
2000–02	Wests Tigers	30	3	0	0	12
2003	Parramatta Eels	13	0	0	0	0
2004	Sydney Roosters	1	0	0	0	0
2004–05	Castleford Tigers	5	2	0	0	8
2006	Featherstone Rovers	10	0	0	0	0
	Total	70	5	0	0	20

Steven Crouch (born 24 December 1977) is an Australian former professional rugby league footballer who played for the Parramatta Eels, Manly-Warringah Sea Eagles, Wests Tigers, Sydney Roosters and the Castleford Tigers.
