= Rhys Wesser =

Australian rugby league footballer

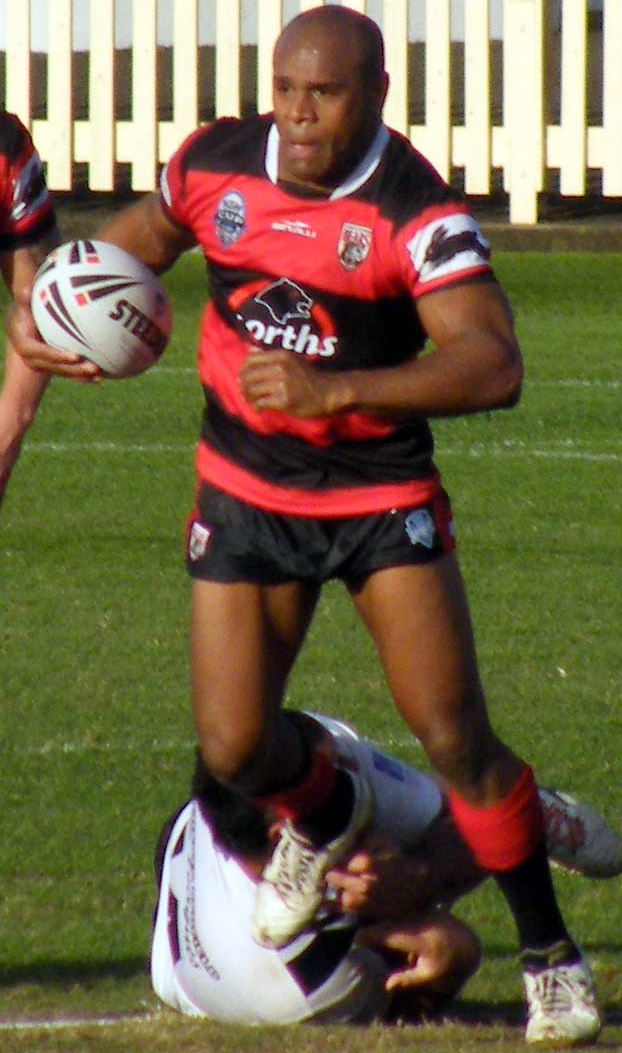

Personal information
- Full name: Rhys Joseph Wesser
- Born: 31 March 1979 (age 47) Rockhampton, Queensland, Australia

Playing information
- Height: 180 cm (5 ft 11 in)
- Weight: 86 kg (13 st 8 lb)
- Position: Fullback, Wing
Club
Years	Team	Pld	T	G	FG	P
1998–08	Penrith Panthers	178	113	1	0	460
2009–11	South Sydney	41	16	0	0	64
	Total	219	129	1	0	524
Representative
Years	Team	Pld	T	G	FG	P
2004–06	Queensland	4	0	0	0	0
2008	Indigenous	1	2	0	0	8

Rhys Joseph Wesser (born 31 March 1979) is an Australian former professional rugby league footballer who played as a fullback. During his 14 seasons in the NRL, he played for the Penrith Panthers, with whom he won the 2003 NRL Premiership, and the South Sydney Rabbitohs. His 113 tries for the Penrith Panthers is a club record. Wesser was also a Queensland and Indigenous Dreamtime representative.

== Background ==
Born in Rockhampton, Queensland, Wesser is of Aboriginal and South Sea Islander (Vanuatuan) descent. He played junior rugby league in his hometown with the Rockhampton Brothers.

At age 16, Wesser was selected for the Queensland under-17s representative side. Wesser finished his schooling at Emmaus College, Rockhampton, and also helped his School side take out the Mal Meninga Under 19s Cup, being the fourth fastest 19-year-old in the state, running times around 100 metres in 11 seconds.

== Professional playing career ==
=== Penrith Panthers ===
Debuting in 1998 Wesser moved from his hometown of Rockhampton to the foot of the Blue Mountains, New South Wales, to play for the Penrith Panthers but he found trouble in pushing for a first-grade spot with Peter Jorgensen holding that title.

Three years later Rhys was given the opportunity to play first grade with the departure of Jorgensen. Wesser scored ten tries in his debut season despite Penrith finishing last on the premiership table.

In 2002, he scored a Penrith club record of nineteen tries, including three hat-tricks, and was dubbed "Rhys-Lightning" and soon became a crowd favourite with his acceleration and line-breaking ability. The following season Wesser bettered his own record by scoring on 25 occasions, earning the title of the most prolific try-scoring fullback for a season in the history of Australian rugby league. The Panthers won their second premiership title, beat the Sydney Roosters in the 2003 NRL grand final in which Wesser played at fullback.

As 2003 NRL premiers, the Penrith travelled to England to face 2003 Super League champions, the Bradford Bulls in the 2004 World Club Challenge. Wesser played at fullback in the Panthers' 22–4 loss. Wesser's try-scoring declined in 2004 with the addition of Amos Roberts to the squad but he still scored thirteen tries.

Wesser was selected to play for Queensland in the 2004 State of Origin series.

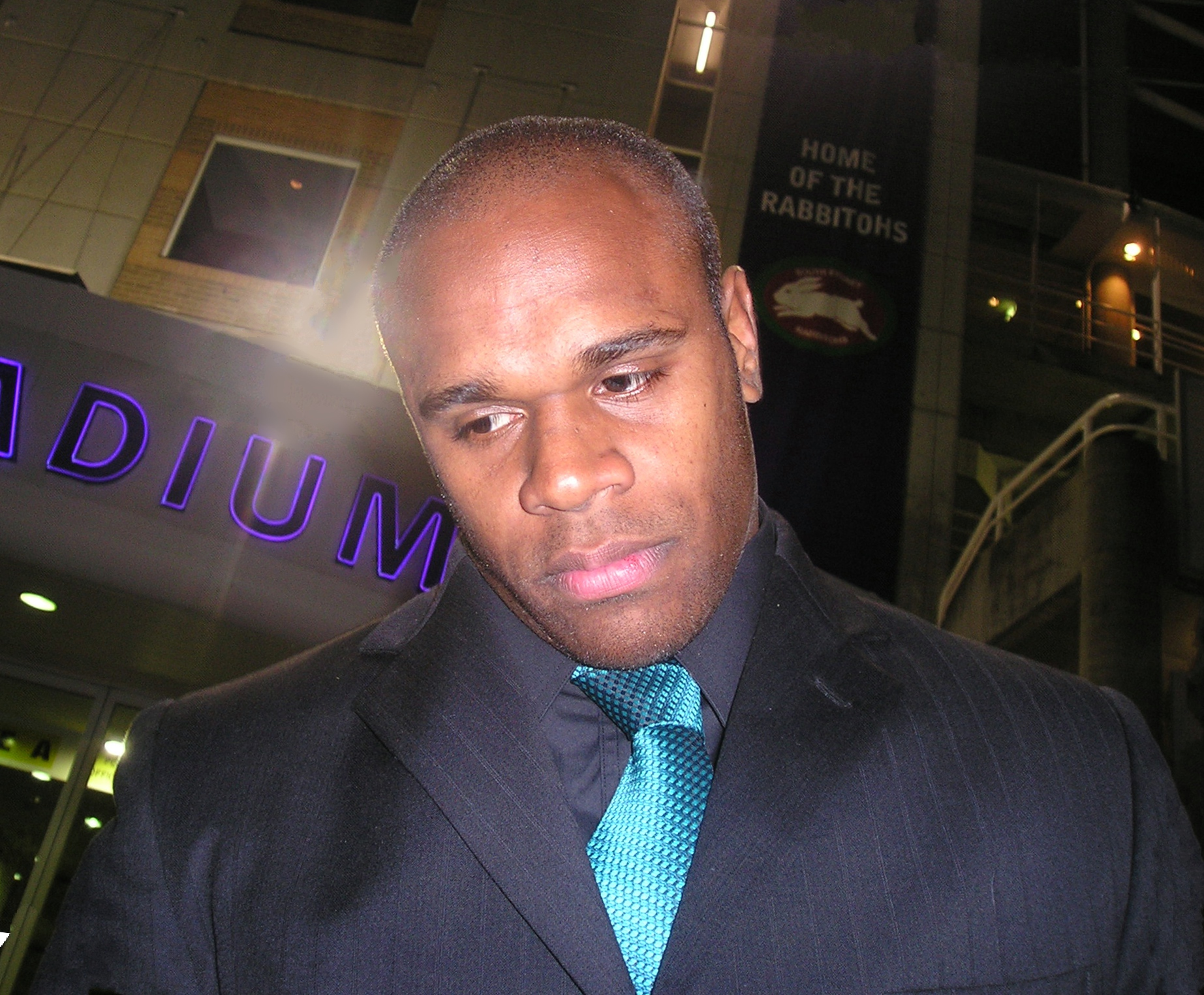
Wesser in 2005

Wesser made the Aboriginal selection in the exhibition game against the New Zealand Māori side as part of the official opening of the 2008 World Cup on 26 October.

In 2008, Wesser announced that he would be joining the South Sydney Rabbitohs in 2009 for a two-year deal. Wesser's 113 tries is the most scored by any Penrith player.

=== South Sydney Rabbitohs ===
In only the second round of the 2009 season, his first with Souths, Wesser injured his knee. He made his return to the field in the 2010 NRL season.

On 12 August 2011, Wesser announced that he would be retiring at the end of the season. He was unable to finish his final season of Rugby League due to another knee injury sustained late in the season.
