= Jason Hooper =

Australian rugby league footballer

Personal information
- Born: 14 October 1977 (age 48) New South Wales, Australia

Playing information
- Height: 6 ft 0 in (1.83 m)
- Weight: 15 st 12 lb (101 kg)
- Position: Loose forward, Stand-off, Centre, Scrum-half
Club
Years	Team	Pld	T	G	FG	P
1997–98	Illawarra Steelers	11	0	0	0	0
1999–02	St. George Illawarra	79	26	0	0	104
2003–07	St Helens	110	44	30	0	236
	Total	200	70	30	0	340

Jason Hooper is an Australian former rugby league footballer who played for the Illawarra Steelers, St George Illawarra Dragons and St Helens.

A former Junior Kangaroo, Hooper completed six seasons in the NRL between 1997 and 2002 before embarking on a long and successful career in Super League for another five seasons.

Having won Super League VI, St Helens contested the 2003 World Club Challenge against 2002 NRL Premiers, the Sydney Roosters. Hooper played at hooker in Saints' 38–0 loss. Hooper played for St Helens at loose forward in their 2006 Challenge Cup Final victory against the Huddersfield Giants. St Helens reached the 2006 Super League Grand final to be contested against Hull F.C. and Hooper played at loose forward in St Helens' 26–4 victory. Hooper announced his retirement at the age of 29 because of a long-term shoulder injury.
