= Jason Kent =

Australian rugby league footballer

Personal information
- Full name: Jason Kent
- Born: 21 April 1980 (age 46) Lithgow, New South Wales, Australia

Playing information
- Height: 181 cm (5 ft 11 in)
- Weight: 91 kg (14 st 5 lb)
- Position: Five-eighth, Centre
Club
Years	Team	Pld	T	G	FG	P
2002	St. George Illawarra	7	0	1	0	2
2003–04	Cronulla Sharks	22	4	0	0	16
2005	Leigh Centurions	23	1	0	0	4
	Total	52	5	1	0	22

Jason Kent (born 21 April 1980) is an Australian former professional rugby league footballer. He was somewhat of a utility back, mainly filling in at lock or five-eighth but he could also play in the centres.

== Background ==
Kent was born in Lithgow, New South Wales, Australia.

== Career ==
He has played for the Leigh Centurions in the Super League competition as well as for the Cronulla-Sutherland Sharks and the St. George Illawarra Dragons in the National Rugby League competition.
