= John Lang (Australian rugby league) =

Australian RL coach and former Australia international rugby league footballer

Personal information
- Born: 7 November 1950 (age 76)

Playing information
- Height: 177 cm (5 ft 10 in)
- Weight: 13 st 0 lb (83 kg)
- Position: Hooker
Club
Years	Team	Pld	T	G	FG	P
1969–79	Easts (Brisbane)
1980	Easts (Sydney)	22	2	0	0	6
	Total	22	2	0	0	6
Representative
Years	Team	Pld	T	G	FG	P
19??–??	Brisbane
1972–80	Queensland	19	6	0	0	18
1980	New South Wales	1	0	0	0	0
1973–80	Australia	3	1	0	0	3

Coaching information
Club
Years	Team	Gms	W	D	L	W%
1981–84	Easts (Brisbane)	73	35	3	35	48
1990–93	Easts (Brisbane)	80	59	2	19	74
1994–01	Cronulla Sharks	220	128	5	87	58
2002–06	Penrith Panthers	125	65	0	60	52
2010–11	South Sydney	48	22	0	26	46
	Total	546	309	10	227	57
Representative
Years	Team	Gms	W	D	L	W%
1997	Australia (SL)	5	3	0	2	60
- Relatives: Martin Lang (son)

John Lang (born 7 November 1950) is an Australian former professional rugby league footballer who played in the 1960s, 1970s and 1980s, and coached in the 1980s through to the 2010s. A Queensland State of Origin and Australian international representative hooker, he played his club football in Brisbane with the Eastern Suburbs Tigers and in Sydney with the Eastern Suburbs Roosters. After playing, Lang became a first-grade coach in Brisbane with Easts, then in Sydney with the Cronulla-Sutherland Sharks, Penrith Panthers (with whom he won the 2003 NRL premiership) and South Sydney Rabbitohs. Lang also coached the Australian Super League test team in 1997.

Lang's son, Martin Lang, also played for the Sharks, Panthers, Queensland and Australia, and uniquely played his entire first-grade career with his father as coach.

== Playing career ==
Lang was a hooker with Brisbane club, Easts Tigers from 1969 to 1979. He won three premierships with the club in 1972, 1977 and 1978. Also in 1972 Lang played for Brisbane in the last ever Bulimba Cup final against Toowoomba, winning 55-2.

Lang was one of only two Queenslanders selected for the 1973 Australian Kangaroo tour to France. Lang also played a test in 1974 against Great Britain and again in 1980 against New Zealand. In 1975 he was a member of the victorious Australian team which won the Rugby League World Cup.

In 1980, Lang accepted an offer from former Kangaroo teammate, Bob Fulton, to move to Sydney to play for Eastern Suburbs. Lang played on the losing side in the 1980 grand final against Canterbury-Bankstown.

Although Lang played in nineteen state matches for Queensland, he also played for New South Wales in 1980. The inaugural year of State of Origin contests, only one match of three was played under a state of origin rules and, as a Sydney-based player, Lang was selected to play in the first match, playing a starring role in the win over Queensland. He then returned to Queensland for the third game of the series (and first ever match between the two states played under the origin selection rule), where Queensland defeated New South Wales 20–10.

== Coaching career ==
After retiring as a player at the end of his successful 1980 season, Lang returned to Brisbane to coach Brisbane Easts Tigers from 1981–1984 and again from 1990–1993. He won premierships with the club in 1983 and 1991 and runners-up in 1992 and 1993.

In 1994, Lang took over from Arthur Beetson as coach of the Cronulla-Sutherland Sharks. As part of Super League, Lang took the Sharks to the 1997 Super League grand final against the Brisbane Broncos, losing 26–8. In the same year, Lang coached the Australian Super League team in five international matches against New Zealand (including a win in the inaugural ANZAC Test) and Great Britain. Although these matches are considered tests by the rest of the world's governing bodies, they are not given full test status by Australian Rugby League.

Lang was awarded the Dally M Coach of the Year in 1995 and 1999.

In 2000 Lang was awarded the Australian Sports Medal for his contribution to Australia's international standing in rugby league.

Lang announced his intention to leave the Sharks at the end of the 2001 NRL season before it had even begun, in February, but it wasn't until late September that year that he signed with the Panthers on a three-year contract. Despite losing the first eight games of the 2002 NRL season, Lang was able to develop a side capable of contending for the finals. In his finest coaching achievement, Penrith defeated the Sydney Roosters in the 2003 NRL grand final by 18–6, thereby answering his detractors at Cronulla who argued that the Sharks could never win a premiership under Lang.

The Panthers finished fourth after the 2004 NRL season and were eliminated by the Bulldogs one game short of the grand final. Penrith narrowly missed the finals in 2005. In February, 2006, Panther's CEO, Glenn Matthews, announced that Matthew Elliott would take over from Lang as coach of the Panthers at the end of the 2006 season. The Panthers subsequently missed the finals and finished in tenth position.

The South Sydney Rabbitohs, in May 2008, appointed Lang as their football consultant, overseeing the club's structure and providing advice to head coach, Jason Taylor.

Following the sacking of Jason Taylor in September 2009, Lang was appointed as the head coach of South Sydney for the 2010 and 2011 seasons. He retired from coaching at the end of the 2011 NRL season.
