= Bill Harrigan =

Australian rugby league referee

Personal information
- Full name: William James Harrigan
- Born: 24 May 1960 (age 66) Sydney, Australia

Refereeing information
| Years | Competition | Apps |
| 1986–2003 | National Rugby League | 393 |
- Source: Rugby League Tables

Bill Harrigan (born 24 May 1960 in Sydney, New South Wales) is an Australian former rugby league football referee, and former head of refereeing for the National Rugby League. Unusually for a sports official, in his long career he was accorded the same profile as some of the top players he refereed. A policeman off-field before he resigned to concentrate on rugby league, he is widely recognised as one of Australia's greatest sports umpires. He retired with the record for most State of Origin matches officiated.

== Early life ==
William James "Bill" Harrigan was born in 1960 in the Western Suburbs of Sydney, New South Wales. He resided in the south-west and greater western suburbs of Sydney for all of his childhood. While not particularly interested in academic studies as school student, he nevertheless represented his schools with distinction in every sport that he could. He attended Fairvale High School before graduating in 1977. Harrigan joined the NSW Police Force in 1979. He served extensively in numerous units, including the Tactical Response Group.

== Rugby League career ==
Harrigan refereed his first game in 1977. In 1985 he refereed his first New South Wales Rugby League premiership match, between Cronulla and Western Suburbs.

Harrigan holds the following Australian rugby league refereeing records

- 393 first grade games,
- 21 State of Origin games,
- 25 Test matches, and
- 10 Grand finals (1989–1991,1997–2003)

In 2024, Harrigan was inducted into the National Rugby League Hall of Fame.

=== Defamation action ===
In July 2001 Harrigan successfully sued Australian radio broadcaster Alan Jones for defamatory remarks made by Jones during a 1998 interview, resulting in an award of $90,000.

=== Post-retirement ===
After retiring from rugby league refereeing, Harrigan was a referee in Gladiators.
