= 2003 Kangaroo tour of Great Britain and France =

Tour by the Australia national rugby league team

2003 Kangaroo tour
- Date: 25 October 2003 – 22 November 2003
- Coach(es): Chris Anderson
- Tour captain(s): Darren Lockyer
- Top point scorer(s): Craig Fitzgibbon (58)
- Top try scorer(s): Danny Buderus (3); Michael Crocker (3); Brett Kimmorley (3); Darren Lockyer (3); Anthony Minichiello (3); Matt Sing (3)
Summary
P	W	D	L
Total
6	6	0	0
Test match
3	3	0	0
Opponent
P	W	D	L
France
1	1	0	0
England A
1	1	0	0
Wales
1	1	0	0
Great Britain
3	3	0	0

Tour chronology
- Previous tour: 2001
- Next tour: 2020 (Cancelled)

The 2003 Kangaroo Tour was a six-match tour by the Australia national rugby league team of France, Wales and England, and to date has been the last Kangaroo Tour. The last three matches were all Tests against Great Britain for the Ashes. Coached by Chris Anderson and captained by Darren Lockyer, Australia continued its dominance, winning all of the three tests against Great Britain and retaining The Ashes that they have held since 1973, although the 3-0 series win didn't show how close the series really was as Australia had to come from behind to win every test, and won each match by a margin of no more than one converted try making it arguably the closest Ashes series since 1974.

== Touring squad ==
The Australian team was coached by Chris Anderson who was making his 4th Kangaroo tour after 1978 and 1982 as a player and 2001 as coach. This equalled the record of his 1978 Kangaroos team mate Bob Fulton who had also toured twice as both a player (1973 and 1978), and twice as a coach (1990 and 1994).

As Gorden Tallis had retired from representative football a month before, the team was captained by the newly appointed Darren Lockyer.

Player	Club	Position(s)	Games (Sub)	Tests (sub)	Tries	Goals	F/Goals	Points
Phil Bailey	Cronulla-Sutherland Sharks	Lock, Centre	3	1	2	0	0	8
Danny Buderus	Newcastle Knights	Hooker	5	3	3	0	0	12
Petero Civoniceva	Brisbane Broncos	Prop	6 (3)	3 (3)	0	0	0	0
Joel Clinton	Penrith Panthers	Prop	2 (1)	0	0	0	0	0
Michael Crocker	Sydney Roosters	Hooker, Five-eighth	5 (3)	3 (2)	3	0	0	0
Michael De Vere	Brisbane Broncos	Centre	4	2	1	5	0	14
Craig Fitzgibbon	Sydney Roosters	Second-row	5	3	1	27	0	58
Ryan Girdler	Penrith Panthers	Centre	1	0	1	0	0	4
Craig Gower	Penrith Panthers	Halfback, Five-eighth	5	2	2	1	0	10
Shannon Hegarty	Sydney Roosters	Centre, Wing	4	1	1	0	0	4
Robbie Kearns	Melbourne Storm	Prop	5 (1)	3	1	0	0	4
Brett Kimmorley	Cronulla-Sutherland Sharks	Halfback	6 (1)	3	3	0	1	13
Luke Lewis	Penrith Panthers	Wing	2	0	0	0	0	0
Darren Lockyer (c)	Brisbane Broncos	Fullback	5	3	3	0	0	12
Willie Mason	Bulldogs	Second-row	6 (5)	3 (3)	0	0	0	0
Anthony Minichiello	Sydney Roosters	Fullback, Wing	5	3	3	0	0	12
Luke Ricketson	Sydney Roosters	Lock	5	3	2	0	0	8
Steve Simpson	Newcastle Knights	Second-row	5	3	1	0	0	4
Matt Sing	North Queensland Cowboys	Wing	4	2	3	0	0	12
Darren Smith*	St. Helens		1 (1)	1 (1)	0	0	0	0
Richard Villasanti	New Zealand Warriors	Prop	2 (2)	0	0	0	0	0
Trent Waterhouse	Penrith Panthers	Second-row	5 (5)	3 (3)	2	0	0	8
Shane Webcke	Brisbane Broncos	Prop	5 (1)	3	0	0	0	0
Craig Wing	Sydney Roosters	Five-eighth, Centre	5	3	1	0	0	4

- Darren Smith was added to the team while the tour was in England

== Pre-Ashes matches ==
Saturday, 25 October

France	10 – 34	Australia
Tries: Julien Rinaldi; Goals: Julien Rinaldi (3)		Tries: Michael Crocker (2), Matt Sing (2), Anthony Minichiello, Trent Waterhouse; Goals: Michael De Vere (5)

Stade d'Albert Domec, Carcassonne
Attendance: 7,813
Referee: Richard Frileux

France: Julien Gerin, Dimitri Pelo, Sylvain Houles, Teddy Sadaoui, Frédéric Zitter, Frédéric Banquet, Julien Rinaldi, Olivier Pramil, Cederic Gay, Jérôme Guisset (c), Daniel Dumas, Jamal Fakir, John Vaigata. Res - Artie Shead, Pierre Sabatie, Abderazak El Khalouki, Marc Faumuina. Coach - Gilles Dumas

Australia: Anthony Minichiello, Luke Lewis, Shannon Hegarty, Michael De Vere, Matt Sing, Craig Wing, Craig Gower, Petero Civoniceva, Michael Crocker, Robbie Kearns (c), Willie Mason, Trent Waterhouse, Phil Bailey. Res - Joel Clinton, Shane Webcke, Richard Villasanti, Brett Kimmorley

Tuesday, 28 October

England A	22 – 26	Australia
Tries: Martin Aspinwall, Ade Gardner, Martin Gleeson, Andy Lynch; Goals: Chris Thorman (3)		Tries: Danny Buderus, Michael Crocker, Robbie Kearns, Matt Sing; Goals: Craig Fitzgibbon (5)

Griffin Park, London
Attendance: 6,817
Referee: Glen Black

England A: Shaun Briscoe, Mark Calderwood, Martin Gleeson, Martin Aspinwall, Ade Gardner, Chris Thorman, Rob Burrow, Andy Lynch, Matt Diskin, Rob Parker, Danny Tickle, Lee Radford, Sean O'Loughlin (c). Res - Danny McGuire, Mick Higham, Danny Sculthorpe, Gareth Hock. Coach - John Kear

Australia: Darren Lockyer (c), Matt Sing, Shannon Hegarty, Michael De Vere, Luke Lewis, Craig Gower, Brett Kimmorley, Joel Clinton, Danny Buderus, Petero Civoniceva, Craig Fitzgibbon, Steve Simpson, Luke Ricketson. Res - Michael Crocker, Trent Waterhouse, Willie Mason, Robbie Kearns

Australia played a non-test international against Wales in Bridgend. The Kangaroos won 76-4, crossing for 11 tries.

Sunday, 2 November

Wales	4 – 76	Australia
Tries: Kris Tassell; Goals:		Tries: Danny Buderus (2); Brett Kimmorley (2); Anthony Minichiello (2); Phil Bailey; Ryan Girdler; Craig Gower; Shannon Hegarty; Darren Lockyer; Steve Simpson; Craig Wing; Goals: Craig Fitzgibbon (11/11); Craig Gower (1/2)

Brewery Field, Bridgend
Attendance: 3,112
Referee: Karl Kirkpatrick (England)
Player of the Match: Brett Kimmorley

Wales	Position	Australia
Paul Atcheson (c)	FB	Darren Lockyer (c)
Hefin O'Hare	WG	Anthony Minichiello
Kris Tassell	CE	Ryan Girdler
Adam Hughes	CE	Phil Bailey
Damian Gibson	WG	Shannon Hegarty
Aled James	SO	Craig Gower
Mark Lennon	SH	Brett Kimmorley
Rob Roberts	PR	Shane Webcke
Ian Watson	HK	Danny Buderus
Anthony Farrell	PR	Petero Civoniceva
Jon Aston	SR	Steve Simpson
Chris Morley	SR	Craig Fitzgibbon
Kevin Ellis	LF	Luke Ricketson
Allan Bateman	Res.	Richard Villasanti
David Mills	Res.	Willie Mason
Gareth Price	Res.	Trent Waterhouse
Jordan James	Res.	Craig Wing
Neil Kelly	Coach	Chris Anderson

== Ashes series ==
=== Test Venues ===
The three Ashes series tests took place at the following venues.

Wigan	Hull	Huddersfield
JJB Stadium	Kingston Communications Stadium	Kirklees Stadium
Capacity: 25,138	Capacity: 25,586	Capacity: 24,500

Australia were to contest Great Britain for the Ashes for the last time in 2003 in what was styled the Think! Road Safety Test series. The Australian Rugby League and Rugby Football League agreed beforehand that the best-of-three series would be officiated by British referees Steve Ganson and Russell Smith for the 1st and 3rd tests, and by Australian referee Tim Mander for the 2nd test. The series was broadcast on television by Sky Sports with commentary by Eddie Hemmings, Mike Stephenson, Shaun McRae, Bill Arthur and Chris Warren. Australian McRae, a former Canberra Raiders trainer and assistant coach under Tim Sheens, had actually toured with both the 1990 and 1994 Kangaroos as a team trainer and as Bob Fulton's unofficial assistant coach.

=== 1st Test ===
18:30 GMT
Saturday, 8 November

Great Britain	18 – 22	Australia
Tries; Brian Carney (2); Keith Senior; Goals; Sean Long (2/4); Paul Deacon (1/1)		Tries; Phil Bailey; Craig Gower; Darren Lockyer; Trent Waterhouse; Goals; Craig Fitzgibbon (3/3); Craig Gower (0/2)

JJB Stadium, Wigan
Attendance: 24,614
Referee: Steve Ganson (United Kingdom)
Player of the Match: Craig Wing

Great Britain	Posit.	Australia
Kris Radlinski	FB	Darren Lockyer (c)
Brian Carney	WG	Anthony Minichiello
Gary Connolly	CE	Craig Wing
Keith Senior	CE	Phil Bailey
Richard Horne	WG	Shannon Hegarty
Paul Sculthorpe	SO	Craig Gower
Sean Long	SH	Brett Kimmorley
Stuart Fielden	PR	Shane Webcke
Terry Newton	HK	Danny Buderus
Adrian Morley	PR	Robbie Kearns
Jamie Peacock	SR	Steve Simpson
Andy Farrell (c)	SR	Craig Fitzgibbon
Mike Forshaw	LF	Luke Ricketson
Paul Anderson	Int.	Petero Civoniceva
Barrie McDermott	Int.	Willie Mason
Paul Deacon	Int.	Trent Waterhouse
Lee Gilmour	Int.	Michael Crocker
David Waite	Coach	Chris Anderson

Lions winger Brian Carney became the first Irishman to represent Great Britain since Tom McKinney at the 1957 Rugby League World Cup.

Great Britain kicked off and Australian front rower Robbie Kearns, taking the very first hit-up of the match was struck high by his opposite number Adrian Morley, who was promptly sent off, leaving his team to play the entire match with only twelve men. It was a record for the fastest ever sending off in rugby league history. In the eleventh minute Australia had reached the opposition's end of the field and after playing the ball right in front of the try line, Gower and Lockyer strung long passes together to get it out to the right wing where Phil Bailey dived over in the corner. The video referee David Campbell ruled that Bailey had grounded the ball before his feet were pulled into touch and he was awarded his first international try. With first choice goal-kicker Fitzgibbon taken from the field suffering concussion in the lead-up to the try, the conversion attempt was made by Gower who missed, so the Kangaroos led 0-4. Great Britain later got the ball down to Australia's end and equalised with a similar try, with international debutant Carney diving over in the right-hand corner just before the eighteen-minute mark. Sean Long's conversion attempt was also missed so the scores were level at 4-4. In the thirty-first minute, the Australians had almost reached Great Britain's try line where on the fifth tackle Lockyer at first receiver put a short kick in behind the defense for Waterhouse to grab onto and fall over the line. The video referee was called upon to check for off-side but the try was awarded. Gower's second conversion attempt was also missed so Australia led 4-8 and this remained the score until half-time.

Nearly five minutes into the second half a brawl erupted between Brian Carney and Michael Crocker and in the aftermath Crocker was sent to the sin bin. A few minutes later, following a handling error by Lockyer close to the centre of his own try-line, Great Britain were awarded a scrum feed. From the scrum win the ball was moved out to left centre Keith Senior who dived over in the fiftieth minute to equalise the scores again. Long kicked the conversion successfully so the home side lead 10-8. This lead was extended with a penalty kick by Long making it 12-8. Australia later made their way down to Great Britain's end of the field and on the last tackle Brett Kimmorley from dummy-half ran up to the defensive line then threw a long cut out pass left to his halves partner Craig Gower to run through a gap and dive over the try-line untouched, equalising the score once again. With Fitzgibbon back on the field the conversion was successful so Australia were leading 12-14 with thirty minutes remaining. From the ensuing kick-off Gower knocked on and from the resulting possession right in front of Australia's try-line, Great Britain, after keeping the ball alive got it out to right winger Carney who dove over in the corner again. The video referee checked that the ball was put down properly before Carney's legs were pulled into touch and he was awarded the try, re-gaining the lead for Great Britain. Paul Deacon with his first conversion attempt for Great Britain kicked the goal from the sideline successfully, so the home side were leading 18-14 with less than ten minutes of the match remaining. Then in the seventy-fifth minute the Kangaroos were a few metres into Great Britain's half of the field and on the last tackle. They swung the ball out to the left where Craig Wing made a break and passed it back inside for Darren Lockyer coming up in support to run the remaining fifteen metres and score untouched under the posts. Fitzgibbon's conversion was successful so Australia were leading 18-20. When taking a goal-line drop out, Andy Farrell kicked it out on the full resulting in a penalty to Australia right in front of the uprights. Fitzgibbon kicked the goal in the final minute so the full-time score was 18-22.

=== 2nd Test ===
15 November 2003

Great Britain	20 – 23	Australia
Tries; Gary Connolly; Terry Newton; Kris Radlinski; Goals; Paul Deacon (4/4)		Tries; Darren Lockyer; Brett Kimmorley; Craig Fitzgibbon; Goals; Craig Fitzgibbon (5/6); Field Goals; Brett Kimmorley

Kingston Communications Stadium, Hull
Attendance: 22,152
Referee: Tim Mander (Australia)
Player of the Match: Brett Kimmorley

Great Britain	Posit.	Australia
Kris Radlinski	FB	Darren Lockyer (c)
Brian Carney	WG	Anthony Minichiello
Gary Connolly	CE	Craig Wing
Keith Senior	CE	Michael De Vere
Richard Horne	WG	Matt Sing
Paul Sculthorpe	SO	Craig Gower
Paul Deacon	SH	Brett Kimmorley
Stuart Fielden	PR	Shane Webcke
Terry Newton	HK	Danny Buderus
Barrie McDermott	PR	Robbie Kearns
Jamie Peacock	SR	Steve Simpson
Adrian Morley	SR	Craig Fitzgibbon
Andy Farrell (c)	LF	Luke Ricketson
Sean Long	Int.	Petero Civoniceva
Mike Forshaw	Int.	Willie Mason
Kevin Sinfield	Int.	Trent Waterhouse
Paul Anderson	Int.	Michael Crocker
David Waite	Coach	Chris Anderson

For his high tackle in the 1st Test, Great Britain front rower Adrian Morley avoided suspension, only incurring a fine of £2,000 from a three-man international judiciary panel consisting of Queensland Rugby League chairman John McDonald, Rugby Football League representative Deryck Fox and chairman, Judge Peter Charlesworth.

=== 3rd Test ===
22 November 2003

Great Britain	12 – 18	Australia
Tries; Kris Radlinski; Paul Sculthorpe; Goals; Paul Deacon (1/2); Sean Long (1/1)		Tries; Luke Ricketson (2); Michael De Vere; Goals; Craig Fitzgibbon (3/3)

McAlpine Stadium, Huddersfield
Attendance: 24,126
Referee: Russell Smith (United Kingdom)
Player of the Match: Adrian Morley

Great Britain	Posit.	Australia
Kris Radlinski	FB	Darren Lockyer (c)
Brian Carney	WG	Anthony Minichiello
Martin Gleeson	CE	Craig Wing
Lee Gilmour	CE	Michael De Vere
Richard Horne	WG	Matt Sing
Paul Sculthorpe	SO	Michael Crocker
Paul Deacon	SH	Brett Kimmorley
Stuart Fielden	PR	Shane Webcke
Terry Newton	HK	Danny Buderus
Adrian Morley	PR	Robbie Kearns
Jamie Peacock	SR	Steve Simpson
Andy Farrell (c)	SR	Craig Fitzgibbon
Mike Forshaw	LF	Luke Ricketson
Sean Long	Int.	Petero Civoniceva
Barrie McDermott	Int.	Willie Mason
Kevin Sinfield	Int.	Trent Waterhouse
Gareth Ellis	Int.	Darren Smith
David Waite	Coach	Chris Anderson

== Statistics ==
Leading Try Scorer

- 3 by Darren Lockyer, Michael Crocker, Anthony Minichiello, Matt Sing and Brett Kimmorley

Leading Point Scorer

- 58 by Craig Fitzgibbon (1 try, 27 goals)

Largest Attendance

- 24,614 - First test vs Great Britain at JJB Stadium

Largest non-test Attendance

- 7,813 - vs France XIII at Stade d'Albert Domec

== Aftermath ==
The series was the first time since the 1986 Kangaroo tour that Australia had won all three Tests against Great Britain. Despite the result, it was felt that Great Britain had closed the gap on Australia, and had missed a good opportunity to win the series for the first time in 33 years. Former Australian captain Mal Meninga was more critical of the British, stating that they lacked the mental toughness needed to win at Test match level, and believed that the team would improve if more of their players joined clubs in the National Rugby League.
