= 2009 Wakefield Trinity Wildcats season =

- Super League rank: 5
- Challenge Cup: 5th round
← 2008	2010 →

The Wakefield Trinity Wildcats' 137th season saw them enter their eleventh Super League campaign, as well as the 2009 Challenge Cup.

== Results ==
=== Super League ===
==== Table ====
Pos	Team	Pld	W	D	L	PF	PA	PD	Pts	Qualification
1	Leeds Rhinos (L, C)	27	21	0	6	805	453	+352	42	Play-offs
2	St Helens	27	19	0	8	733	466	+267	38	Play-offs
3	Huddersfield Giants	27	18	0	9	690	416	+274	36	Play-offs
4	Hull Kingston Rovers	27	17	1	9	650	516	+134	35	Play-offs
5	Wakefield Trinity Wildcats	27	16	0	11	685	609	+76	32	Play-offs
6	Wigan Warriors	27	15	0	12	659	551	+108	30	Play-offs
7	Castleford Tigers	27	14	0	13	645	702	−57	28	Play-offs
8	Catalans Dragons	27	13	0	14	613	660	−47	26	Play-offs
9	Bradford Bulls	27	12	1	14	653	668	−15	25	
10	Warrington Wolves	27	12	0	15	649	705	−56	24	
11	Harlequins	27	11	0	16	591	691	−100	22	
12	Hull F.C.	27	10	0	17	502	623	−121	20	
13	Salford City Reds	27	7	0	20	456	754	−298	14	
14	Celtic Crusaders	27	3	0	24	357	874	−517	6	

Source: Rugby League Project
Rules for classification: 1) Points; 2) Points difference; 3) Number of points scored;
(C) Champions; (L) League Leaders' Shield Winners

==== Super League results ====
W Win D Draw L Loss

Super League results
Date	Round	Versus	H/A	Venue	Result	Score	Tries	Goals	Attendance	Report
8 February	17 (Note: Game rearranged due to pitch maintenance work at the JJB Stadium during June)	Wigan Warriors	A	JJB Stadium	W	12–6	Halley (2)	Martin (2)	14,377	
13 February	1	Leeds Rhinos	A	Headingley Stadium	L	4–18		Martin (2)	15,643	
22 February	2	Salford City Reds	H	Belle Vue	W	29–10	Blanche (2), Atkins (2), Wilkes	Martin (4) Drew (DG)	6,758	
27 February	3	Warrington Wolves	H	Belle Vue	W	48–22	Blaymire (3), Halley (2), Ferguson (2), George	Martin (7), Drew	5,169	
8 March	4	Hull Kingston Rovers	A	New Craven Park	L	18–31	Gleeson, Ferguson, Henderson	Martin (3)	9,038	
15 March	5	Catalans Dragons	H	Belle Vue	W	30–10	Blanch, Gleeson, Atkins, Murphy, Martin	Martin (4), Brough	4,807	
27 March	7	St. Helens	H	Belle Vue	L	18–42	Atkins, Murphy, Snitch	Brough (3)	6,038	
10 April	8	Castleford Tigers	A	The Jungle	W	35–6	Blaymire, Gleeson, Atkins (2), Martin	Martin (3), Brough (4 +DG)	10,155	
13 April	9	Bradford Bulls	H	Belle Vue	W	24–22	Blanch, Atkins, Brough, Snitch	Brough (4)	6,516	
17 April	10	Hull F.C.	A	KC Stadium	W	21–14	Grix, Wilkes, Pitts, Demetriou	Brough (2 +DG)	11,975	
26 April	11	Wigan Warriors	H	Belle Vue	L	26–40	Blanch (2), Brough (2)	Brough (5)	5,521	
2 May	12	Bradford Bulls	N	Murrayfield Stadium	L	16–32	Blaymire, Snitch, Demetriou	Martin, Brough	29,627	
17 May	13	Harlequins RL	A	The Twickenham Stoop	L	17–24	Martin, Brough, Moore	Brough (2 +DG)	3,612	
24 May	14	Huddersfield Giants	H	Belle Vue	L	6–54	Blaymire	Martin	5,037	
30 May	6 (Note: Game postponed from 22 Marrch in respect to the death of Wakefield player, Leon Walker, who received a fatal injury during the reserves' game.)	Celtic Crusaders	A	Brewery Field	W	50–6	Atkins, Grix, Rooney (2), Brough, Snitch, Drew (2), Korkidas	Brough (7)	2,089	
7 June	15	Bradford Bulls	A	Grattan Stadium	L	22–36	Gleeson (3), Grix, Snitch	Brough	8,387	
13 June	16	Hull FC	H	Belle Vue	W	37–22	Blaymire, Peterson, Martin (2), Brough, Ferguson	Martin, Brough (5 +DG)	4,721	
28 June	18	Harlequins RL	H	Belle Vue	W	20–18	Grix, Martin, Wilkes	Brough (4)	5,079	
5 July	19	Huddersfield Giants	A	Galpharm Stadium	L	14–30	Grix, Peterson, Martin	Brough	7,486	
10 July	20	Leeds Rhinos	H	Belle Vue	L	30–32	Blaymire, Grix, Atkins, Obst	Brough (7)	6,425	
17 July	21	St Helens	A	GPW Recruitment Stadium	W	22–20	Grix (2), Atkins, Obst	Brough (3)	8,651	
26 July	22	Castleford Tigers	H	Belle Vue	L	12–20	Brough (2)	Brough (2)	8,371	
31 July	23	Salford City Reds	A	The Willows	W	30–24	Gleeson, Grix, Korkidas, Wilkes, Ferguson	Brough (5)	3,151	
16 August	24	Celtic Crusaders	H	Belle Vue	W	46–12	George (2), Gleeson, Brough, Demetriou, Stosic, Leo-Latu (2)	Brough (7)	7,893	
23 August	25	Warrington Wolves	A	Halliwell Jones Stadium	W	40–28	Morton, Gleeson, George (2), Obst (2), Ferguson	Drew (6)	8,681	
5 September	26	Catalans Dragons	A	Stade Gilbert Brutus	W	34–20	Atkins (2), George (2), Obst	Drew (5), Brough (2)	8,755	
13 September	27	Hull Kingston Rovers	H	Belle Vue	W	24–10	Murphy, Obst, Ferguson, Moore	Brough (3), Obst	6,328	

==== Play-offs ====
W Win L Loss

Play-off results
Date	Round	Versus	H/A	Venue	Result	Score	Tries	Goals	Attendance	Report
19 September	EPO	Catalans Dragons	H	Belle Vue	L	16–25	George (2), Atkins	Drew (2)	4,008	

=== Challenge Cup ===
W Win L Loss

Challenge Cup results
Date	Round	Versus	H/A	Venue	Result	Score	Tries	Goals	Attendance	Report
3 April	4	Leigh Centurions	H	Belle Vue	W	54–0	Brough, Blaymire (2), Murphy (2), Blanch, Obst (2), Sculthorpe, Leo-Latu	Brough (7)	2,637	
9 May	5	Wigan Warriors	H	Belle Vue	L	17–28	Demetriou, Leo-Latu, Martin	Brough (3 +DG)	4,883	

== Players ==
=== Full squad ===
No	Player	Position	Previous club
1	Matt Blaymire	Full back	York City Knights
2	Damien Blanch	Wing	Widnes Vikings
3	Tony Martin	Centre	New Zealand Warriors
4	Ryan Atkins	Centre	Bradford Bulls
5	Matthew Petersen	Wing	Gold Coast Titans
6	Jamie Rooney	Stand off	Featherstone Rovers
7	Danny Brough	Scrum half	Castleford Tigers
8	Jason Demetriou	Utility	Widnes Vikings
9	Brad Drew	Hooker	Huddersfield Giants
10	Danny Sculthorpe	Prop	Wigan Warriors
11	Stephen "Steve" Snitch	Second row	Huddersfield Giants
12	Oliver Wilkes	Second row	Widnes Vikings
13	Scott Grix	Utility	Widnes Vikings
14	Sam Obst	Hooker	Whitehaven
15	James Stosic	Prop	Gold Coast Titans
16	Ricky Bibey	Prop	Leigh Centurions
17	Kevin Henderson	Centre	Leigh Centurions
18			
19	Sean Gleeson	Centre	Wigan Warriors
20	Tevita Leo-Latu	Hooker	Cronulla Sharks
21			
22			
23			
24	Dale Ferguson	Second rower	Wakefield Trinity Wildcats
25	Richard Moore	Prop	Leigh Centurions
26	Luke George	Winger	Huddersfield Giants
27	Aaron Murphy	Centre	Wakefield Trinity Wildcats
28	Kyle Bibb	Second rower	Wakefield Trinity Wildcats
29	Jay Pitts	Scrum half	Wakefield Trinity Wildcats
30	Cain Southernwood	Utility	Wakefield Trinity Wildcats

=== Transfers ===
Transfers for 2009 (in)

Name	Transferred from	Date released
James Stosic	Gold Coast Titans	October 2008
Steve Snitch	Huddersfield Giants	October 2008
Dave Halley	Bradford Bulls	October 2008

Transfers for 2009 (out)

Name	Transferred to	Date released
Duncan MacGillivray	Retired	October 2008
Paul Reilly	Oldham R.L.F.C.	October 2008
Brett Ferres	Castleford Tigers	October 2008
Joe Hirst	Featherstone Rovers	October 2008
Josh Griffin	Huddersfield Giants	October 2008
Kyle Wood	Doncaster	October 2008
Jason Golden	Harlequins RL	October 2008

== Death of Leon Walker ==
On 22 March 2009, Leon Walker, a reserve player, collapsed in the 63rd minute of a game against Crusaders Reserves at Maesteg rugby union ground. He was airlifted to Morriston Hospital, Swansea where he was pronounced dead upon arrival. He was 20 years old at the time of his death. An inquest subsequently found that his death was the result of a rare undiagnosed heart defect, and the coroner ruled that he died of natural causes.

Walker started playing rugby league for the amateur side, the Churwell Chiefs. Walker joined the Salford City Reds in 2006 and played for the club for three years. After his rookie season he was named the Salford Reds Junior Academy Player of the Year. In 2007 Walker represented both the Yorkshire and England U18 sides.

He joined the Wakefield Trinity Wildcats in November 2008, joining their senior academy side.

Walker attended Morley High School and was a scaffolder by trade, and was the cousin and team mate of Luke Blake.
