= World Club Challenge records and statistics =

Records of the rugby league tournament

Notable achievements, records, and statistics of the World Club Challenge are listed below:

== Records and statistics ==
Note: The below statistics reflect records from all World Club Challenge matches from 1976 to present. They only include the finals of World Club Series 2015 and 2017, and of the 1997 World Club Championship.

=== Match records ===
==== Biggest win ====
Year	Winner	Score	Loser
2015	South Sydney Rabbitohs	39 – 0	St. Helens
2000	Melbourne Storm	44 – 6	St. Helens
2003	Sydney Roosters	38 – 0	St. Helens

==== Highest scoring game ====
Year	Winner	Score	Loser
2005	Leeds Rhinos	39 – 32	Bulldogs RLFC

==== Lowest scoring game ====
Year	Winner	Score	Loser
1987	Wigan	8 – 2	Manly-Warringah Sea Eagles

=== Individual records ===
==== Top try scorers ====
Tries	Name (club/s)
5	Brett Morris (Sydney Roosters / St George Illawarra) Ryan Hall (Leeds)
4	Joe Burgess (Wigan)
3	Marcus Bai (Melbourne / Bradford); Michael Hancock (Brisbane); Michael Jennings (Sydney); Jamie Jones-Buchanan (Leeds); Danny McGuire (Leeds); Darren Smith (Brisbane); Brett Stewart (Manly-Warringah)
2	Jesse Bromwich (Melbourne); George Carmont (Wigan); Josh Charnley (Wigan); Hazem El Masri (Canterbury-Bankstown); Stuart Fielden (Bradford); Ade Gardner (St Helens); Scott Hill (Melbourne); Andrew Johns (Newcastle); Jamahl Lolesi (Canterbury-Bankstown, Wests Tigers); Martin Offiah (Widnes); Julian O'Neill (Brisbane); Justin O'Neill (North Queensland); Robbie Paul (Bradford); Joel Reddy (South Sydney); Robbie Ross (Melbourne); Paul Sculthorpe (St Helens); Lesley Vainikolo (Bradford); Anthony Watmough (Manly-Warringah); Michael Withers (Bradford); Nick Zisti (Hunter)

Most tries in a game

Tries	Name (club/s)	Opponent	Date
3	Michael Jennings (Sydney)	Wigan	22 February 2014
3	Joe Burgess (Wigan)	Cronulla	19 February 2017
3	Brett Morris (Sydney)	Wigan	17 February 2019

Most points in a game

Points	Name (club/s)	Tries	Goals	Opponent	Date
22	Craig Fitzgibbon (Sydney)	1	9	St. Helens	14 February 2003

==== Most goals ====
Goals	Name (club/s)
17	Kevin Sinfield (Leeds)
12	Frano Botica (Wigan); Cameron Smith (Melbourne)
11	Paul Deacon (Bradford / Wigan)
9	Craig Fitzgibbon (Sydney)

Drop goals

Goals	Name (club/s)
2	Kevin Sinfield (Leeds)
1	Paul Deacon (Bradford); Sean Long (St Helens); Joe Lydon (Wigan); Paul Sculthorpe (St Helens); Jamie Soward (St George Illawarra); Sam Tomkins (Wigan); Declan Patton (Warrington); Adam Reynolds(South Sydney); Lewis Dodd (St Helens)

=== Attendance ===
==== Top 5 attendances ====
Year	Home	Away	City, country	Stadium	Attendance
1994	Brisbane Broncos	Wigan	Brisbane, Australia	ANZ Stadium	54,220
2005	Leeds Rhinos	Bulldogs RLFC	Leeds, England	Elland Road	37,028
1987	Wigan	Manly-Warringah Sea Eagles	Wigan, England	Central Park	36,895
2008	Leeds Rhinos	Melbourne Storm	Leeds, England	Elland Road	33,204
2009	Leeds Rhinos	Manly-Warringah Sea Eagles	Leeds, England	Elland Road	32,569

== World Club Series only ==
The World Club Series was the temporary name of the tournament following its temporary restructure between 2015 and 2017.

=== Biggest win ===
Year	Winner	Score	Loser
2015	South Sydney Rabbitohs	39 – 0	St. Helens

=== Highest scoring game ===
Year	Winner	Score	Loser
2016	Brisbane Broncos	42 – 12	Wigan Warriors

=== Lowest scoring game ===
Year	Winner	Score	Loser
2015	Brisbane Broncos		Wigan Warriors

=== Individual ===
==== Top try scorers ====
- List of players who have scored 2 or more tries.

Tries	Name (club(s))
3	Joe Burgess (Wigan Warriors)
2	Joel Reddy (South Sydney); Dominique Peyroux (St. Helens); Aidan Guerra (Sydney); Corey Oates (Brisbane); Kodi Nikorima (Brisbane); Ryan Atkins (Warrington Wolves)
