= 2010 Wakefield Trinity Wildcats season =

- Super League XV Rank: 11th
- Challenge Cup: 4th round

Team information
- Chairman: Ted Richardson
- Head coach: John Kear
- Captain: Jason Demetriou
- Stadium: Belle Vue
← 2009	List of seasons	2011 →

In the 2013 rugby league season, Wakefield Trinity (then known as Wakefield Trinity Wildcats) competed in Super League XV and the 2010 Challenge Cup.

== Results ==
=== Super League ===
==== League table ====
Pos	Team	Pld	W	D	L	PF	PA	PD	Pts	Qualification
1	Wigan Warriors (L, C)	27	22	0	5	922	411	+511	44	Play-offs
2	St Helens	27	20	0	7	946	547	+399	40	Play-offs
3	Warrington Wolves	27	20	0	7	885	488	+397	40	Play-offs
4	Leeds Rhinos	27	17	1	9	725	561	+164	35	Play-offs
5	Huddersfield Giants	27	16	1	10	758	439	+319	33	Play-offs
6	Hull F.C.	27	16	0	11	569	584	−15	32	Play-offs
7	Hull Kingston Rovers	27	14	1	12	653	632	+21	29	Play-offs
8	Celtic Crusaders	27	12	0	15	547	732	−185	24	Play-offs
9	Castleford Tigers	27	11	0	16	648	766	−118	22	
10	Bradford Bulls	27	9	1	17	528	728	−200	19	
11	Wakefield Trinity Wildcats	27	9	0	18	539	741	−202	18	
12	Salford City Reds	27	8	0	19	448	857	−409	16	
13	Harlequins	27	7	0	20	494	838	−344	14	
14	Catalans Dragons	27	6	0	21	409	747	−338	12	

Source: Rugby League Project
Rules for classification: 1) Points; 2) Points difference; 3) Number of points scored;
(C) Champions; (L) League Leaders' Shield Winners

==== Super League results ====
W Win D Draw L Loss

Super League results
Date	Round	Versus	H/A	Venue	Result	Score	Tries	Goals	Attendance	Report
30 January	3	Harlequins	A	The Stoop	W	18–10	Jeffries, Millard, Murphy	Brough (3)	3,688	RLP
7 February	1	Catalans Dragons	H	Hearwell Stadium	W	28–20	Morton (2), Ferguson, George, Morrison	Brough (4)	5,818	RLP
14 February	2	Leeds Rhinos	H	Hearwell Stadium	W	28–18	Brough, Gleeson, Jeffries, Millard	Brough (6)	9,783	RLP
26 February	4	St Helens	A	GPW Stadium	L	16–22	Millard (2), Morton	Brough (2)	10,717	RLP
6 March	5	Huddersfield Giants	H	Hearwell Stadium	L	0–52			5,237	RLP
12 March	6	Hull Kingston Rovers	A	Craven Park	W	31–18	Tronc (2), Blaymire, Millard, Obst	Brough (3), Obst (2), Blayimre (FG)	8,004	RLP
21 March	7	Salford City Reds	H	Hearwell Stadium	W	36–6	Blanch, Ferguson, Leo-Latu, Millard, Morrison, Murphy, Obst	Obst (4)	4,883	RLP
26 March	8	Warrington Wolves	A	Halliwell Jones Stadium	L	16–32	Korkidas, Murphy, Obst	Cooke (2)	10,723	RLP
2 April	9	Castleford Tigers	H	Hearwell Stadium	W	19–6	Leo-Latu, Morrison, Obst	Cooke (3 + FG)	8,337	RLP
5 April	10	Wigan Warriors	A	DW Stadium	L	14–54	Blaymire (2), Blanch	Cooke	14,615	RLP
11 April	11	Crusaders RL	H	Hearwell Stadium	L	10–20	Blanch, George	Cooke	4,671	RLP
23 April	12	Hull F.C.	H	KC Stadium	L	8–12	Blanch, Millard		11,160	RLP
1 May	13	Leeds Rhinos	N	Murrayfield Stadium	L	30–34	Blanch (2), Jeffries, Johnson, Leo-Latu	Jeffries (5)	26,642	RLP
14 May	14	Bradford Bulls	H	Hearwell Stadium	L	10–29	Johnson, Murphy	Cooke	5,381	RLP
23 May	15	Harlequins	H	Hearwell Stadium	W	54–12	George (2), Gleeson (2), Obst (2), Blanch, Cooke, Demetriou, Henderson	Cooke (7)	4,371	RLP
4 June	16	Leeds Rhinos	A	Headingley Stadium	L	22–28	Demetriou, Morrison, Murphy, Obst	Cooke (3)	13,869	RLP
13 June	17	Wigan Warriors	H	Hearwell Stadium	L	6–48	Blanch	Cooke	6,937	RLP
19 June	18	Catalans Dragons	A	Stade Gilbert Brutus	L	23–30	Blanch, Blaymimre, Cooke, Rinaldi	Cooke (3), King (FG)	5,055	RLP
27 June	19	Crusaders RL	A	Racecourse Ground	W	41–0	Blanch, Demetriou, Jeffries, Johnson, Leaeno, Millard	Cooke (6), Jeffries (FG)	2,837	RLP
4 July	20	Hull Kingston Rovers	H	Hearwell Stadium	L	14–46	Johnson, Millard, Moore	Cooke	6,218	RLP
10 July	21	Hull F.C.	H	Hearwell Stadium	W	29–6	Cooke, Demetriou, Leaeno, Millard, Rinaldi	Cooke (4), Jeffires (FG)	5,366	RLP
18 July	22	Castleford Tigers	H	The Jungle	L	16–40	Morrison (2), Blaymire	Cooke (2)	8,517	RLP
25 July	23	St Helens	H	Hearwell Stadium	L	6–50	Hyde	Cooke	5,217	RLP
1 August	24	Huddersfield Giants	A	Galpharm Stadium	L	6–58	Gleeson	Jeffires	6,055	RLP
15 August	25	Warrington Wolves	H	Hearwell Stadium	L	18–36	Blanch, Jeffries, Leo-Latu, Morrison	Jeffries	5,562	RLP
22 August	26	Bradford Bulls	A	Grattan Stadium	L	28–38	Gleeson, Kirmond, Millard, Morrison, Obst	Jeffries (4)	7,437	RLP
5 September	27	Salford City Reds	A	The Willows	L	12–16	Gleeson, Leo-Latu	Jeffries (2)	3,401	RLP

=== Challenge Cup ===
W Win L Loss

Challenge Cup results
Date	Round	Versus	H/A	Venue	Result	Score	Tries	Goals	Attendance	Report
17 April	4	Harlequins	A	The Stoop	L	16–23	Blanch, George, Kirmond	Cooke (2)	2,355	RLP

== Players ==
=== 2010 squad ===
Number	Player	Position	Previous club
1	Matt Blaymire	Full back	York City Knights
2	Damien Blanch	Wing	Widnes Vikings
3	Sean Gleeson	Centre	Wigan Warriors
4	Daryl Millard	Centre	Canterbury Bulldogs
5	Luke George	Winger	Huddersfield Giants
6	Ben Jeffries	Stand off	Bradford Bulls
10	Michael Korkidas	Prop	Huddersfield Giants
11	Dale Ferguson	Second rower	Wakefield Trinity Wildcats
12	Glenn Morrison	Second row	Bradford Bulls
13	Jason Demetriou	Loose forward	Widnes Vikings
14	Sam Obst	Hooker	Whitehaven
15	Kyle Bibb	Second rower	Hull
16	Paul Johnson	Second row	Warrington Wolves
17	Kevin Henderson	Centre	Leigh Centurions
18	Aaron Murphy	Centre	Leeds Rhinos
19	Paul King	Prop	Hull
20	Tevita Leo-Latu	Hooker	Cronulla Sharks
21	Paul Cooke	Scrum half	Hull Kingston Rovers
22	Cain Southernwood	Scrum half	Wakefield Trinity Wildcats
23	Dale Morton	Centre	Wakefield Trinity Wildcats
24	James Davey	Wing	Wakefield Trinity Wildcats
25	Richard Moore	Prop	Leigh Centurions
26	Matthew Wildie	Prop	Wakefield Trinity Wildcats
25	Russell Spiers	Full back	Wakefield Trinity Wildcats
28	Kyle Trout	Hooker	Wakefield Trinity Wildcats
29	Matthew King	Second row	Wakefield Trinity Wildcats
30	Danny Cowling	Centre	Wakefield Trinity Wildcats
35	Charlie Leaeno	Prop	Canterbury-Bankstown Bulldogs
36	Julien Rinaldi	Hooker	Villeneuve Leopards

=== Transfers ===
==== Gains ====
- Ben Jeffries Bradford Bulls
- Paul Johnson Warrington Wolves
- Paul King Hull FC
- Charlie Leaeno Canterbury Bulldogs
- Daryl Millard Canterbury Bulldogs
- Glenn Morrison Bradford Bulls
- Terry Newton Bradford Bulls
- Julien Rinaldi Bradford Bulls
- Shane Tronc North Queensland Cowboys

==== Losses ====
- Dave Halley Bradford Bulls
- Steve Snitch Castleford Tigers
- Tony Martin Crusaders RL
- Frank Winterstein Crusaders RL
- Oliver Wilkes Harlequins RL
- Brad Drew Huddersfield Giants
- Scott Grix Huddersfield Giants
- Jay Pitts Leeds Rhinos
- Ryan Atkins Warrington Wolves
