= 2004 Challenge Cup =

Rugby league competition

2004 Powergen Challenge Cup
- Duration: 9 Rounds
- Highest attendance: 73,734
- Broadcast partners: BBC Sport
- Winners: St. Helens
- Runners-up: Wigan Warriors
- Lance Todd Trophy: Sean Long

The 2004 Challenge Cup, known as the Powergen Challenge Cup for sponsorship reasons, was the 103rd staging of the Challenge Cup, a European rugby league cup competition.

The competition began in November 2003, and ended with the final in May 2004, which was played at the Millennium Stadium in Cardiff due to ongoing reconstruction work at Wembley Stadium.

The tournament was won by St. Helens, who beat Wigan Warriors 32–16 in the final. The Lance Todd Trophy was won by Sean Long.

== First round ==
Date	Team one	Team two	Score
28 Nov	Leigh Miners R.	Blackbrook	52-24
29 Nov	Aberavon	Ince Rose Bridge	6-28
29 Nov	Birkenshaw	St Albans	22-10
29 Nov	Bradford Dudley	Embassy	38-8
29 Nov	British Army	East Hull	12-22
29 Nov	Cas. Lock Lane	Batley Vic	48-8
29 Nov	Castleford Panthers	Shaw Cross	18-10
29 Nov	East Leeds	Queens	20-6
29 Nov	Elland	Kells	26-12
29 Nov	Featherstone Lions	Coventry Bears	60-21
29 Nov	Hensingham	Wath Brow Hornets	10-18
29 Nov	Hunslet Warriors	Orrell St James	9-8
29 Nov	Leigh East	Milford	28-10
29 Nov	Normanton	Navy	14-20
29 Nov	Oldham St Annes	Hull Dockers	19-12
29 Nov	Oulton	Loughborough University	40-22
29 Nov	RAF	Huddersfield UR	16-12
29 Nov	Saddleworth	Rochdale Mayfield	0-51
29 Nov	Sheffield Hills	Crosfields	2-31
29 Nov	Siddal	Simms Cross	14-2
29 Nov	South London	West Bowling	4-36
29 Nov	Walney	Thatto Heath	8-12
29 Nov	West Hull	Askam	30-8
29 Nov	Widnes Albion	Eastmoor	2-21
29 Nov	Widnes St Maries	Sharlston Rovers	6-20
29 Nov	Wigan St Pats	Ideal Isberg	12-17
30 Nov	Heworth	Edinburgh	34-8
06 Dec	Woolston	Eccles & Salford Jrs	18-22

== Second round ==
Date	Team one	Team two	Score
13 Dec	Birkenshaw	Bradford Dudley	6-46
13 Dec	Cas. Lock Lane	Ideal Isberg	13-6
13 Dec	Cott. Phoenix	Crosfields	12-20
13 Dec	East Hull	Navy	46-18
13 Dec	East Leeds	Featherstone Lions	12-18
13 Dec	Eccles & Salford Jrs	Castleford Panthers	6-11
13 Dec	Elland	Eastmoor	28-4
13 Dec	Ince Rose Bridge	Hunslet Warriors	28-14
13 Dec	Leigh Miners R.	Siddal	34-6
13 Dec	Rochdale Mayfield	Leigh East	20-10
13 Dec	RAF	Thatto Heath	0-32
13 Dec	Sharlston Rovers	Oldham St Annes	14-9
13 Dec	West Bowling	Dinamo	18-22
13 Dec	West Hull	Heworth	76-4

== Third round ==
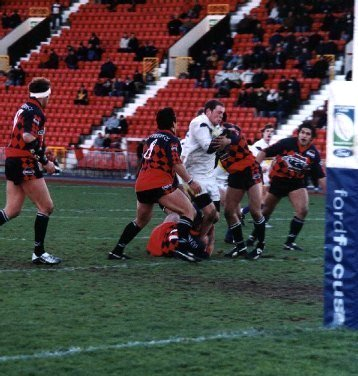
Gateshead Thunder vs Limoux Grizzlies

Date	Team one	Team two	Score
06 Feb	Chorley Lynx	Locomotiv	54-6
06 Feb	Leigh Miners R.	Sheffield Eagles	12-14
06 Feb	Oldham	Castleford Panthers	16-8
06 Feb	Sharlston Rovers	Dewsbury	30-28
07 Feb	Hunslet Hawks	Featherstone Lions	32-0
07 Feb	London Skolars	Rochdale Mayfield	22-16
08 Feb	Barrow	Pia	20-22
08 Feb	Bradford Dudley	Keighley	16-14
08 Feb	Crosfields	Workington Town	14-46
08 Feb	Doncaster	West Hull	28-6
08 Feb	Elland	Leigh	4-64
08 Feb	Featherstone Rovers	Cas. Lock Lane	96-0
08 Feb	Gateshead	Limoux	22-26
08 Feb	Halifax	Oulton	66-10
08 Feb	Hull Kingston Rovers	UTC	22-23
08 Feb	Ince Rose Bridge	Batley	8-42
08 Feb	Rochdale Hornets	Dinamo	60-24
08 Feb	Swinton	East Hull	14-26
08 Feb	Thatto Heath	Whitehaven	12-26
08 Feb	York City Knights	Villeneuve	28-8

== Fourth round ==
Date	Team one	Team two	Score
27 Feb	Chorley Lynx	Wakefield Trinity	6-88
28 Feb	Castleford Tigers	UTC	32-20
28 Feb	Dudley Hill	Batley	14-76
29 Feb	Bradford	St Helens	10-30
29 Feb	Huddersfield	Pia	50-16
29 Feb	Hunslet Hawks	Doncaster	20-48
29 Feb	Leigh	Hull FC	14-21
29 Feb	Limoux	Halifax	19-18
29 Feb	London	Salford City	24-8
29 Feb	London Skolars	Featherstone Rovers	6-52
29 Feb	Sheffield Eagles	York City Knights	24-32
29 Feb	Wigan	Widnes	38-12
29 Feb	Workington Town	Leeds	18-68
02 Mar	East Hull	Whitehaven	4-14
02 Mar	Rochdale Hornets	Warrington	0-80
03 Mar	Oldham	Sharlston Rovers	24-4

== Fifth round ==
Date	Team one	Team two	Score
13 Mar	St Helens	Leeds Rhinos	24-14
14 Mar	Huddersfield Giants	Doncaster Dragons	36-12
14 Mar	Batley Bulldogs	Whitehaven Warriors	6-29
14 Mar	Limoux Grizzlies	Wigan Warriors	20-80
14 Mar	Hull FC	Castleford Tigers	26-0
14 Mar	Featherstone Rovers	York City Knights	26-29
14 Mar	Oldham R.L.F.C.	Warrington Wolves	10-44
14 Mar	London Broncos	Wakefield Trinity Wildcats	10-29

== Quarter-finals ==
Date	Team one	Team two	Score
26 Mar	St Helens	Hull FC	31-26
28 Mar	Huddersfield Giants	York City Knights	50-12
28 Mar	Whitehaven Warriors	Warrington Wolves	10-42
28 Mar	Wigan Warriors	Wakefield Trinity Wildcats	20-4

== Semi-finals ==
Date	Team one	Team two	Score
18 Apr	St Helens	Huddersfield Giants	46-6
25 Apr	Wigan Warriors	Warrington Wolves	30-18

== Final ==
15 May 2004

St. Helens	32 – 16	Wigan Warriors
Tries: Gilmour, Talau (2), Wellens, Sculthorpe; Goals: Long (6)	Report	Tries: Newton, Dallas (2); Goals: Farrell (2)

Millennium Stadium, Cardiff
Attendance: 73,734
Referee: Karl Kirkpatrick (Warrington)

Teams:

St Helens: Paul Wellens, Ade Gardner, Martin Gleeson, Willie Talau, Darren Albert; Jason Hooper, Sean Long, Nick Fozzard, Keiron Cunningham, Keith Mason, Chris Joynt, Lee Gilmour, Paul Sculthorpe (c)
Subs: Dominic Fe'aunati, Jon Wilkin, Ricky Bibey, Mark Edmondson Coach: Ian Millward

Wigan: Kris Radlinski, David Hodgson, Sean O'Loughlin, Kevin Brown, Brett Dallas, Danny Orr, Adrian Lam, Quentin Pongia, Terry Newton, Craig Smith, Danny Tickle, Gareth Hock, Andy Farrell (c)
Subs: Stephen Wild, Mick Cassidy, Danny Sculthorpe, Terry O'Connor Coach: Mike Gregory
