= 2003 World Club Challenge =

Rugby league competition

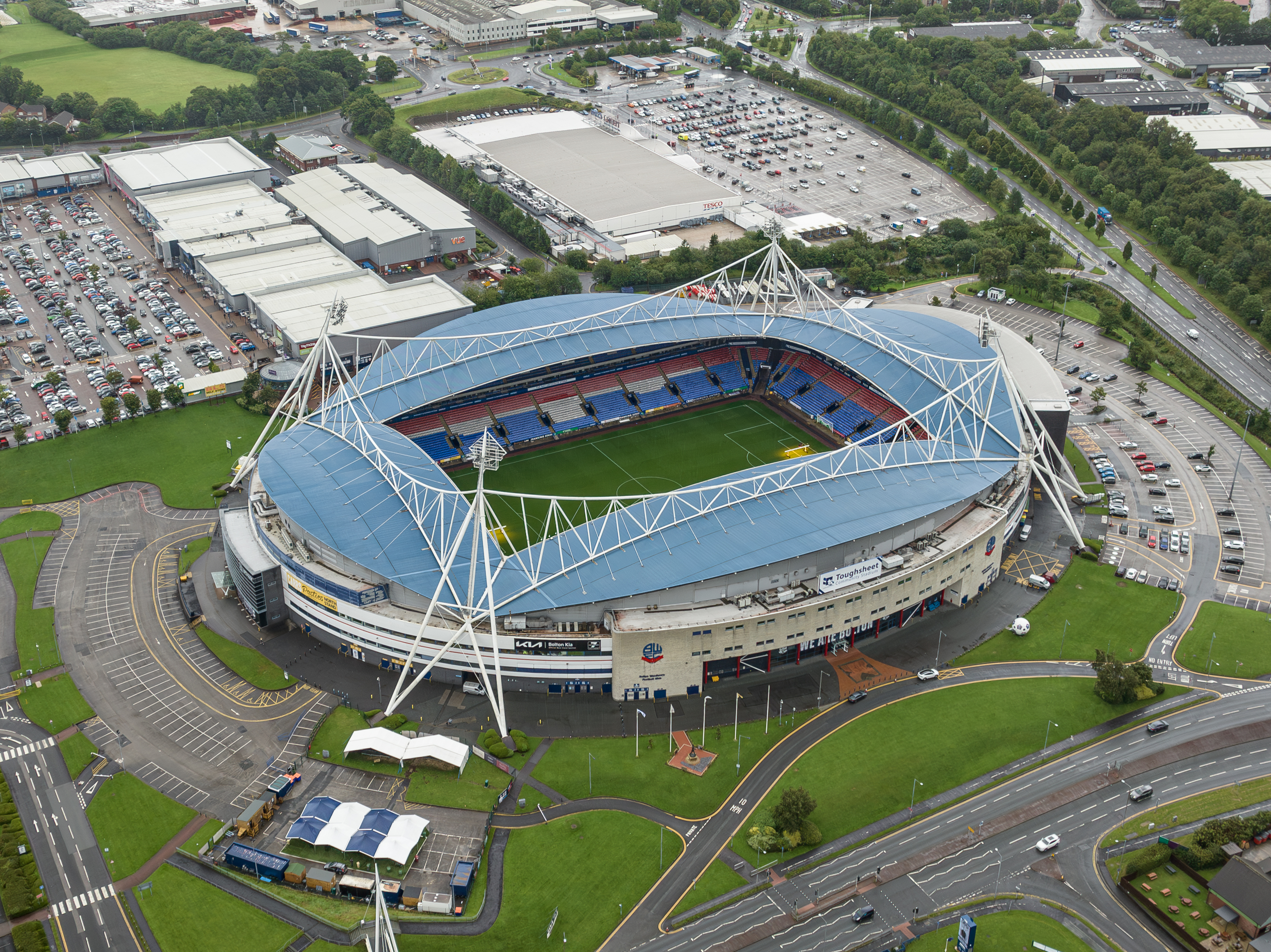
- The Reebok Stadium hosted the match
St. Helens	Sydney Roosters
(SL)	(NRL)
0	38
	1	2	Total
ST H	0	0	0
SYD	18	20	38
- Date: 14 February 2003
- Stadium: Reebok Stadium
- Location: Bolton, England
- Man of the Match: Craig Fitzgibbon
- Referee: Russell Smith (England)
- Attendance: 19,807

Broadcast partners
- Broadcasters: (United Kingdom) Sky Sports
- Commentators: Eddie Hemmings; Mike Stephenson

The 2003 World Club Challenge match was contested on Sunday, 16 February by National Rugby League season 2002 premiers, the Sydney Roosters and Super League VII premiers, St. Helens. 19,807 spectators turned out at Bolton's Reebok Stadium for the match, which was refereed by Russell Smith.

This was the first time the two clubs had played each other since the inaugural World Club Challenge game at the Sydney Cricket Ground in 1976. On that occasion the Roosters, then known as Eastern Suburbs (as it was a Sydney only competition at the time), defeated St Helens 25-2. The attendance on that occasion was 26,856.

== Match summary ==
14 February 2003

St. Helens	0 – 38	Sydney Roosters
Tries: Goals:	(Report)	Tries: Craig Fitzgibbon; Adrian Morley; Todd Byrne; Brad Fittler; Todd Payten; Goals: Craig Fitzgibbon (9)

Reebok Stadium, Bolton
Attendance: 19,807
Referee: Russell Smith (England)
Player of the Match: Craig Fitzgibbon

== Teams ==
The Roosters went into the Challenge making one change in their starting lineup (Todd Byrne went on to the wing for the retired Brett Mullins). The Sydney Roosters ran out comprehensive 0-38 champions over the Saints outfit. Tries to Craig Fitzgibbon, Adrian Morley, new input Todd Byrne, captain Brad Fittler and Todd Payten plus the 9 goals from Fitzgibbon completed a season for the Sydney Roosters.

St Helens	Sydney Roosters

FB	5	Anthony Stewart
LW	2	Darren Albert
RC	3	Martin Gleeson
LC	4	Paul Newlove
RW	19	Ade Gardner
SO	20	Tommy Martyn
SH	7	Sean Long
PR	8	Darren Britt
HK	6	Jason Hooper
PR	10	John Stankevitch
SR	11	Chris Joynt (c)
SR	12	Darren Smith
LF	13	Paul Sculthorpe
Substitutions:
IC	14	Barry Ward
IC	15	Tim Jonkers
IC	9	Mickey Higham
IC	17	Mark Edmondson
Coach:
(England) Ian Millward

FB	1	Anthony Minichiello
RW	2	Todd Byrne
LC	3	Chris Flannery
RC	4	Justin Hodges
LW	5	Shannon Hegarty
FE	6	Brad Fittler (c)
HB	7	Craig Wing
PR	8	Jason Cayless
HK	17	Michael Crocker
PR	10	Peter Cusack
SR	11	Adrian Morley
SR	12	Craig Fitzgibbon
LK	13	Luke Ricketson
Substitutions:
IC	14	Ned Catic
IC	15	Todd Payten
IC	16	Chad Robinson
IC	9	Brett Finch
Coach:
(Australia) Ricky Stuart

== See also ==
- World Club Challenge
