= Kris Tassell =

Wales international rugby league footballer

Personal information
- Born: 16 September 1973 (age 52) Mount Isa, Queensland, Australia

Playing information
- Height: 189 cm (6 ft 2 in)
- Weight: 96 kg (15 st 2 lb)
- Position: Fullback, Wing, Centre
Club
Years	Team	Pld	T	G	FG	P
1992	Canberra Raiders	2	0	0	0	0
1995	Canterbury Bulldogs	4	0	0	0	0
1996–99	North Qld Cowboys	42	18	0	0	72
2000–01	Salford City Reds	45	12	0	0	48
2002	Wakefield Trinity Wildcats	24	10	0	0	40
2003	Swinton Lions	25	12	0	0	48
	Total	142	52	0	0	208
Representative
Years	Team	Pld	T	G	FG	P
2000–04	Wales	11	6	0	0	24
- Education: Trinity Anglican School
- Relatives: Brad Tassell (brother); Jason Tassell (brother)

Kris Tassell (born 16 September 1973) is a former Wales international rugby league footballer who played in the 1990s and 2000s. fullback, wing, or centre, he played for the Canberra Raiders, Canterbury-Bankstown Bulldogs, North Queensland Cowboys, Salford City Reds, Wakefield Trinity and the Swinton Lions.

== Background ==
Born in Mount Isa, Tassell, who is of Welsh descent through his grandparents, played his junior rugby league for the Cairns Kangaroos and attended Trinity Anglican School before being signed by the Canberra Raiders.

== Playing career ==
In 1990, Tassell started at fullback for the Queensland under-17 side in their 14–all draw with New South Wales. In Round 10 of the 1992 NSWRL season, he made his first grade in the Raiders' 31–12 loss to the Parramatta Eels.

In 1995, Tassell joined the Canterbury-Bankstown Bulldogs, playing four first grade games, spending the majority of the season in reserve grade. In 1996, he returned to Queensland, signing with the North Queensland Cowboys. That season, he scored eight tries in nine games before a knee injury against the Newcastle Knights in Round 11 ended his season. He finished the year as the club's equal-top try scorer. In 1998, after just three games in 1997, Tassell became a regular starter for the Cowboys, playing 18 games on the wing. In 1999, his final year at the club, he played 12 games.

In 2000, Tassell joined the Salford City Reds in the Super League. He played 26 games that season, mainly at centre, scoring seven tries. Later the year, he represented Wales at the Rugby League World Cup. In their first group game against the Cook Islands, he scored a hat trick and was named Man of the Match. In their semi-final loss to Australia, he scored a try in the 22–46 defeat.

In 2002, after two seasons with Salford, Tassell moved to Wakefield Trinity, where he scored 10 tries in 24 games. In 2003, Tassell played for the Swinton Lions in the National League Two. In November 2003, he once again scored a try against Australia in Wales' 4–76 loss on the 2003 Kangaroo tour of Great Britain and France.

== Statistics ==
=== NSWRL/ARL/Super League/NRL ===
Season	Team	Matches	T	G	GK %	F/G	Pts
1992	Canberra	2	0	0	—	0	0
1995	Canterbury-Bankstown	4	0	0	—	0	0
1996	North Queensland	9	8	0	—	0	32
1997	North Queensland	3	1	0	—	0	4
1998	North Queensland	18	6	0	—	0	24
1999	North Queensland	12	3	0	—	0	12
Career totals		48	18	0	–	0	72

=== Super League ===
Season	Team	Matches	T	G	GK %	F/G	Pts
2000	Salford City	26	7	0	—	0	28
2001	Salford City	19	5	0	—	0	20
2002	Wakefield Trinity	24	10	0	—	0	40
Career totals		69	22	0	–	0	88

=== International ===
Season	Team	Matches	T	G	GK %	F/G	Pts
2000	Wales	5	4	0	—	0	16
2002	Wales	1	1	0	—	0	4
2003	Wales	3	1	0	—	0	4
2004	Wales	2	0	0	—	0	0
Career totals		11	6	0	–	0	24

== Personal life ==
Tassell's older brothers, Brad and Jason, were both professional rugby league players.
