= Luke Blake =

English rugby league footballer

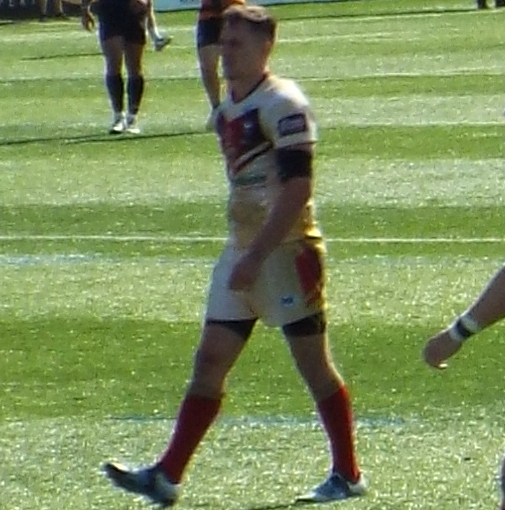

Personal information
- Full name: Luke Blake
- Born: 10 August 1989 (age 36)

Playing information
- Position: Hooker
Club
Years	Team	Pld	T	G	FG	P
2006–08	Hunslet Hawks	5	0	0	0	0
2009	Wakefield Trinity Wildcats	2	0	0	0	0
2009–13	Dewsbury Rams	61	8	0	0	12
2014–16	Batley Bulldogs	78	7	0	0	28
2021–25	Batley Bulldogs	17	1	0	0	4
	Total	163	16	0	0	44
- Source: As of 2 February 2023
- Relatives: Leon Walker (cousin)

Luke Blake is a former English professional rugby league player who last played as a hooker for the Batley Bulldogs.

He has also played for the Hunslet Hawks, Wakefield Trinity Wildcats, Dewsbury Rams and Batley Bulldogs in the Betfred Championship.

== Playing career ==
Blake returned to Batley Bulldogs in 2021 after a five-year absence.

== Personal ==
Luke Blake is the cousin of former teammate of Leon Walker.
