= Todd Byrne =

Australian rugby league footballer

Personal information
- Full name: Todd Byrne
- Born: 16 July 1978 (age 47) Sydney, New South Wales, Australia

Playing information
- Height: 187 cm (6 ft 2 in)
- Weight: 89 kg (14 st 0 lb)
- Position: Fullback, Wing, Centre
Club
Years	Team	Pld	T	G	FG	P
2001–04	Sydney Roosters	61	30	0	0	120
2005–07	New Zealand Warriors	43	21	0	0	84
2008–09	Hull FC	24	6	0	0	24
	Total	128	57	0	0	228

Todd Byrne (born 16 July 1978), also known by the nicknames of "Bones", "The Big Pretzel", and "Skinny", is an Australian former professional rugby league footballer who played in the 2000s. He played at club level in the National Rugby League for the Sydney Roosters and New Zealand Warriors, and in 2008's Super League XIII and 2009's Super League XIV for Hull FC, as a fullback, wing or centre.

== Early life ==
Byrne was born in Sydney, New South Wales, Australia.

== National Rugby League ==
Byrne as a youngster played his junior rugby league for Coogee Randwick Wombats. He then played for the Sydney Roosters and New Zealand Warriors in the National Rugby League. Byrne played a leading role in the Roosters late season charge to the 2002 premiership, playing at centre, and scoring or playing a role in many memorable Roosters tries during their 9 match unbeaten run to win the premiership. Having won the 2002 NRL Premiership, the Roosters traveled to England to play the 2003 World Club Challenge against Super League champions, St Helens R.F.C. Byrne played on the wing and scored a try in Easts victory. Byrne is best remembered for being the player that Scott Sattler cover tackled in the memorable turning point of the 2003 NRL Grand Final.

== Super League ==
Byrne moved to Super League side Hull for the 2008 season. At the end of 2009, Byrne retired from rugby league.

=== Career highlights ===
- First Grade Debut: Round 7, Sydney Roosters v Penrith at Sydney Football Stadium, 2 April 2001
