= Jason Tassell =

Australian rugby league footballer

Personal information
- Full name: Jason Tassell
- Born: 17 July 1969 (age 55); Mount Isa, Queensland, Australia

Playing information
- Position: Second-row, Lock, Hooker
Club
Years	Team	Pld	T	G	FG	P
1990–94	Eastern Suburbs	48	2	0	0	8
1995–97	South Sydney	31	0	0	0	0
	Total	79	2	0	0	8
- Source: As of 7 June 2019
- Relatives: Brad Tassell (brother); Kris Tassell (brother)

Jason Tassell is an Australian former professional rugby league footballer who played in the 1990s. He played for Eastern Suburbs and the South Sydney Rabbitohs in the New South Wales Rugby League (NSWRL) competition and ARL competition.

== Background ==
Tassell is the brother of the rugby league footballer; Kris Tassell. His other brother Brad, was the former CEO of the PNG Hunters.

== Playing career ==
Tassell made his first grade debut for Eastern Suburbs against Parramatta in Round 14 1990 which ended in a 42–12 loss at Henson Park.

Tassell played with Easts until the end of the 1994 season before departing to join arch rivals South Sydney. Tassell played a total of 3 seasons at South Sydney as the club struggled towards the bottom of the ladder. Tassell's final game in the top grade came against North Sydney in Round 6 1997 at North Sydney Oval.
