= Brad Tassell =

Australian rugby league player

Personal information
- Born: 12 November 1967 (age 58) Mount Isa, Queensland, Australia

Playing information
- Position: Wing
Club
Years	Team	Pld	T	G	FG	P
1987–89	Eastern Suburbs	9	1	0	0	4
- Relatives: Jason Tassell (brother); Kris Tassell (brother)

Brad Tassell is a former Australian professional rugby league player and executive. A winger, he played nine games in the NSWRL for the Eastern Suburbs between 1987 and 1989. Tassell also served as the chief executive officer of the Papua New Guinea Hunters until his resignation in 2015.

Born in Mount Isa, Queensland, Tassell's brothers, Jason and Kris, also played rugby league.

In 2016, Tassell unsuccessfully stood as a candidate in the Division of Leichhardt for Katter's Australian Party.
