= Danny Cowling =

English rugby league footballer (born 1991)

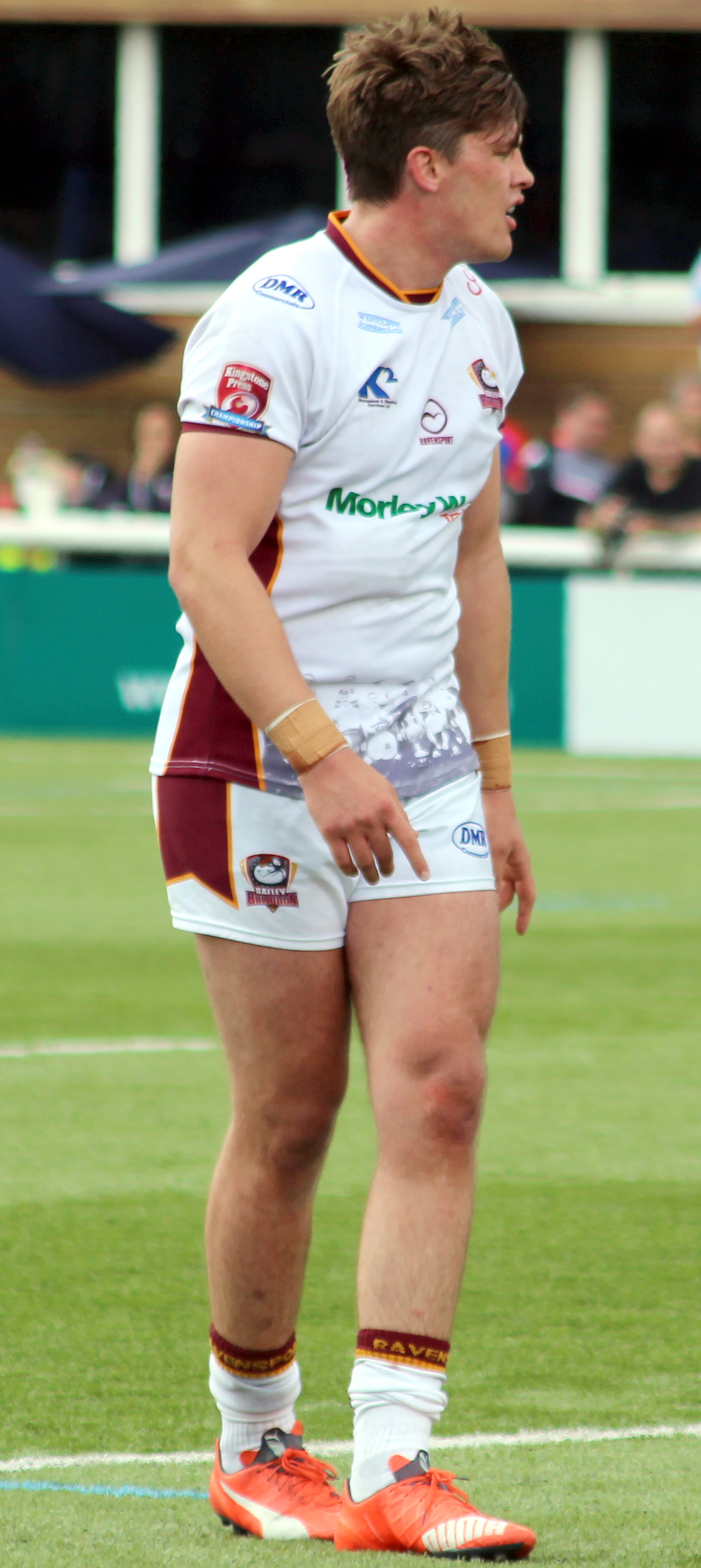

Personal information
- Full name: Daniel Cowling
- Born: 7 December 1991 (age 34) Pontefract, West Yorkshire, England

Playing information
- Position: Centre
Club
| Years | Team | Pld | T | G | FG | P |
|---|---|---|---|---|---|---|
| 2012–13 | Wakefield Trinity | 3 | 0 | 0 | 0 | 0 |
| 2012(loan) | → Doncaster | 11 | 4 | 0 | 0 | 16 |
| 2013(loan) | → Doncaster | 27 | 9 | 0 | 0 | 36 |
| 2014 | Halifax | 15 | 4 | 0 | 0 | 16 |
| 2015 | Doncaster | 16 | 2 | 0 | 0 | 8 |
| 2016– | Batley Bulldogs | 28 | 5 | 0 | 0 | 20 |
| 2018(loan) | → Hunslet | 1 | 0 | 0 | 0 | 0 |
| | Total | 101 | 24 | 0 | 0 | 96 |
- Source: As of 15 April 2018

Danny Cowling (born 7 December 1991) is a retired English rugby league footballer who played for the Batley Bulldogs in the Championship.

He also played for Halifax, Wakefield Trinity in the Super League, and was dual-registered with Doncaster.

He was previously signed with Doncaster.
