= Dimitri Pelo =

France international rugby league footballer

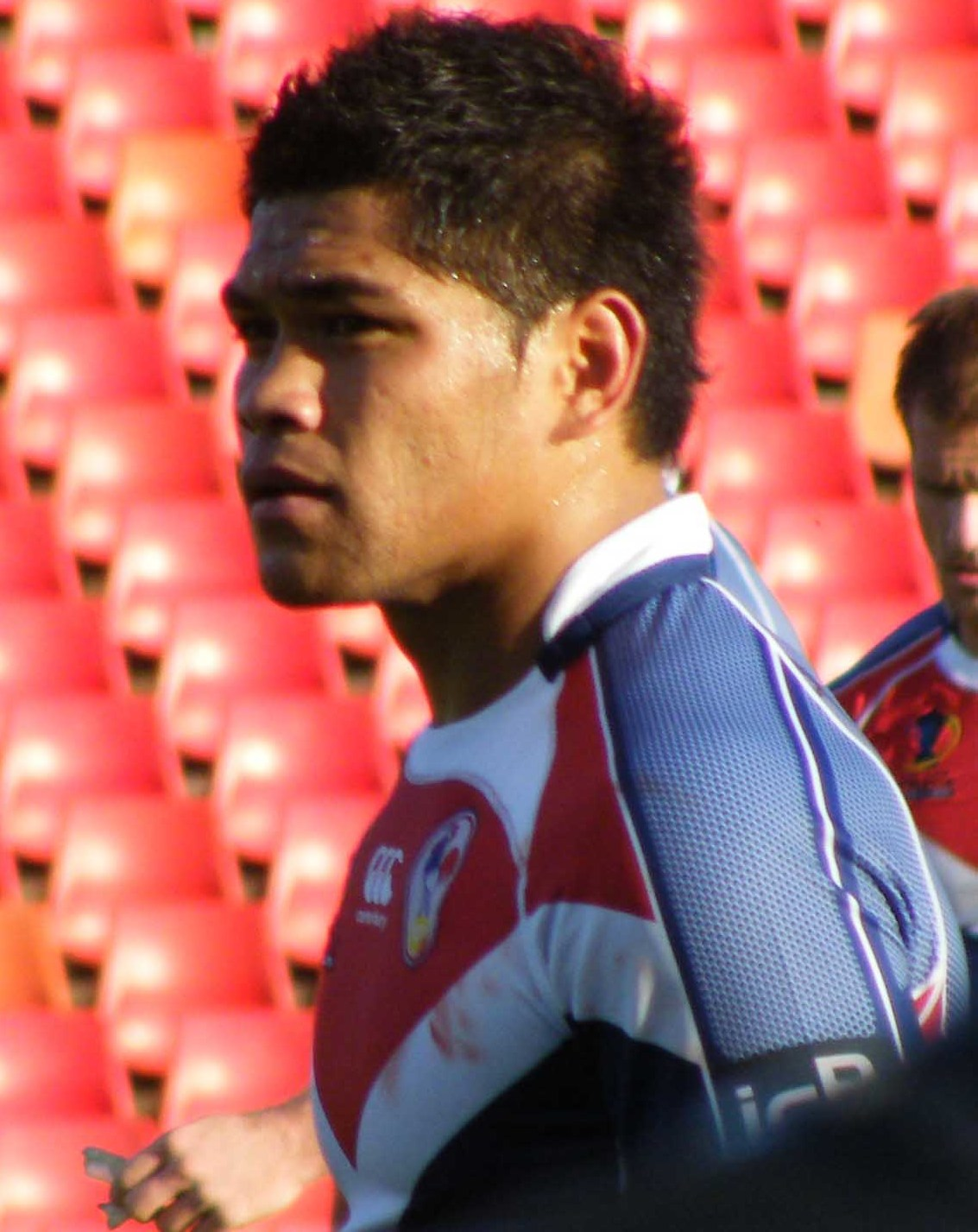

Personal information
- Born: 17 April 1985 (age 41) Nouméa, New Caledonia
- Height: 181 cm (5 ft 11 in)
- Weight: 89 kg (14 st 0 lb)

Playing information

Rugby league
- Position: Wing, Fullback
Club
| Years | Team | Pld | T | G | FG | P |
|---|---|---|---|---|---|---|
| 2007–10 | Catalans Dragons | 87 | 38 | 0 | 0 | 152 |
| 2012 | Canberra Raiders | 5 | 0 | 0 | 0 | 0 |
| | Total | 92 | 38 | 0 | 0 | 152 |
Representative
| Years | Team | Pld | T | G | FG | P |
| 2005–08 | France | 4 | 1 | 0 | 0 | 0 |

Rugby union
Club
| Years | Team | Pld | T | G | FG | P |
|---|---|---|---|---|---|---|
| 2010–11 | Montpellier Herault | 14 | 5 | 0 | 0 | 15 |
- Source: As of 3 February 2018

Dimitri Pelo (born 17 April 1985) is a French former professional rugby league footballer who last played for the Canberra Raiders in the NRL. He has previously played for Montpellier Herault RC after switching codes in 2010 and for the Catalans Dragons club of the Super League. He plays as a wing or fullback.

== Career ==
Pelo was born in Nouméa, New Caledonia, an overseas territory of France. He emigrated to Australia with his parents while still in his adolescence, originally settling in the north-eastern state of Queensland. While living there, Pelo began playing junior rugby league, catching the eye of Cronulla-Sutherland Sharks scouts who signed him to the Sydney club for several years.

While at Cronulla-Sutherland, Pelo went on to represent the Australian Schoolboys team for whom he scored two tries in a Test match defeat against the England Academy in 2002, but he could not make his way into the Cronulla first-grade side, instead being relegated to the reserves and lower competitions.

During the 2005 season, Pelo was called up by French national team along with fellow clubman Daniel Dumas; during this time his contract with the Cronulla club expired and he left the club. Pelo then moved back to Queensland, originally signing a short-term deal with the Burleigh Bears club in the Queensland Cup in the hope of securing a longer-term deal with the Gold Coast Titans in the National Rugby League (NRL).

During the end of the 2006 season, the Gold Coast club displayed interest in Pelo, selecting him in several early trial matches and a sevens competition but ultimately he was unsuccessful in securing any deal with the club so began to look abroad. For the beginning of the 2007 season Pelo signed a deal with the French club Catalans Dragons.

He was named in the France training squad for the 2008 Rugby League World Cup.

He was named in the France squad for the 2008 Rugby League World Cup.

He switched codes for the 2010/11 season, playing for Montpellier Hérault RC.

In December 2011 he trialled with the Canberra Raiders with the hope of gaining a first-grade contract after the departure of Daniel Vidot to the St. George Illawarra Dragons. His trial successfully earned him a one-year contract with the Canberra club. He made his debut in the Round 12 36–18 defeat against South Sydney on 12 May 2012.

=== Career highlights ===
- 1999-2001: Played for Queensland Juniors
- 2001: Signed with the Bull Dogs
- 2002: Represented Australian School Boys
- 2002–2004: Played for Burleigh Bears – Queensland Cup
- 2003: Represented France – Mediterranean Cup - 4 appearances, 1 try
- 2004–2006: Played for reserves Cronulla Sharks
- 2005: Represented France – Rugby Sevens Cup - 4 appearances, 2 tries
- 2006: Played for Burleigh Bears (Gold Coast Titans Reserves)
- 2007–2010: Played for Catalans Dragons (Super League)
- 2007 – 12 appearances, 5 tries
- 2008- 20 appearances, 10 tries
- 2009 -24 appearances, 17 tries
- 2010- 17 appearances, 4 tries
- 2008- (play offs) 2 tries
- 2009 – (play-offs) 3 tries
- 2008- Carnegie challenge cup – 4 appearances, 1 try
- 2009- carnegie challenge cup – 5 appearances, 2 tries
- 2010- carnegie challenge cup - 6 appearances, 2 tries
- 2008: Represented France – World Cup - 2 appearances
- 2009: Represented France – 4 Nations - 2 appearances
- 2010- 2011: Played for Montpellier MHR (top 14 rugby union) - 9 appearances, 5 tries
  - Amlin challenge cup – 5 appearances, 2 tries
- 2012: Played for Canberra Raiders (NRL) – 5 appearance

== Career playing statistics ==
=== Point scoring summary ===
| Games | Tries | Goals | F/G | Points |
|---|---|---|---|---|
| 79 | 35 | - | - | 140 |

=== Point scoring summary ===
| Games | Tries | Goals | F/G | Points |
|---|---|---|---|---|
| 9 | 5 | - | - | 20 |

=== Matches played ===
| Team | Matches | Years |
|---|---|---|
| Catalans Dragons | 79 | 2007–2010 |

=== Matches played ===
| Team | Matches | Years |
|---|---|---|
| Montpellier | 9 | 2011 |
