= Craig Fitzgibbon =

Australian rugby league footballer and coach

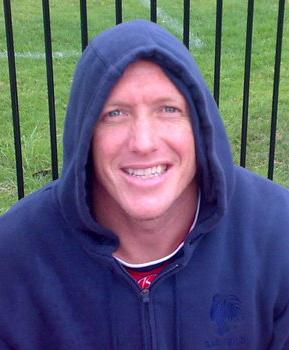

Personal information
- Born: 16 June 1977 (age 49) Wollongong, New South Wales, Australia
- Height: 191 cm (6 ft 3 in)
- Weight: 104 kg (16 st 5 lb)

Playing information
- Position: Second-row, Lock, Prop
Club
| Years | Team | Pld | T | G | FG | P |
|---|---|---|---|---|---|---|
| 1998 | Illawarra Steelers | 20 | 2 | 38 | 0 | 84 |
| 1999 | St. George Illawarra | 15 | 4 | 25 | 0 | 66 |
| 2000–09 | Sydney Roosters | 229 | 37 | 664 | 0 | 1476 |
| 2010–11 | Hull F.C. | 44 | 9 | 9 | 0 | 54 |
| | Total | 308 | 52 | 736 | 0 | 1680 |
Representative
| Years | Team | Pld | T | G | FG | P |
| 2001–08 | NSW Country | 5 | 0 | 5 | 0 | 10 |
| 2002–08 | Australia | 19 | 3 | 50 | 0 | 112 |
| 2003–08 | New South Wales | 11 | 1 | 20 | 0 | 44 |
| 2011 | Exiles | 1 | 0 | 0 | 0 | 0 |

Coaching information
Club
| Years | Team | Gms | W | D | L | W% |
| 2022– | Cronulla Sharks | 131 | 81 | 0 | 50 | 62 |
Representative
| Years | Team | Gms | W | D | L | W% |
| 2016–17 | NSW Country | 2 | 0 | 0 | 2 | 0 |
- Source: As of 31 March 2024
- Father: Allan Fitzgibbon

Craig Fitzgibbon (born 16 June 1977) is an Australian professional rugby league coach who is the head coach of Cronulla-Sutherland Sharks in the NRL and a former professional rugby league footballer who played in the 1990s, 2000s and 2010s.

A New South Wales State of Origin and Australia international representative goal-kicking forward, he played in the NRL for the Illawarra Steelers and St. George Illawarra Dragons as well as for the Sydney Roosters, with whom he won the 2002 NRL Premiership. Fitzgibbon then played in the Super League for Hull FC. He was also the last coach of the Country New South Wales rugby league team.

== Early years ==
The son of former professional rugby league footballer and coach Allan Fitzgibbon, Craig Fitzgibbon played his first game of junior football with the Dapto under-9Bs. His heroes as a child were Gavin Miller, Bradley Clyde and Andrew Ettingshausen.

== Playing career ==
=== National Rugby League ===
Fitzgibbon began his playing career for the Illawarra Steelers in 1998. In his first season, he was the Steelers' top point-scorer and was named rookie of the year. Following the Steelers' joint-venture with St. George, he played for the joint-venture club St. George Illawarra Dragons. Fitzgibbon played from the bench in the 1999 NRL Grand Final, scoring the first try in St. George Illawarra's 20–18 loss.

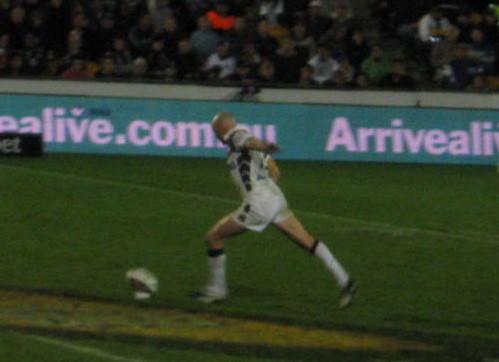
Roosters forward Craig Fitzgibbon kicking a conversion in a finals match against the Warriors, 2008.

Fitzgibbon subsequently transferred to the Sydney Roosters in 2000. He played at second-row forward and scored a try in the Roosters' 2000 NRL Grand Final loss to the Brisbane Broncos. Eventually, Fitzgibbon won a premiership with the Roosters, playing at second-row forward in their 2002 NRL grand final victory over the New Zealand Warriors and winning the Clive Churchill Medal for his best-on-ground performance.

Having won the 2002 NRL Premiership, the Sydney Roosters travelled to England to play the 2003 World Club Challenge against Super League champions, St Helens R.F.C. Fitzgibbon played at second-row forward, scoring a try and kicking nine goals in Sydney's victory. In the 2003 NRL grand final Fitzgibbon played in the second row and was the Roosters' goal-kicker in their loss to the Penrith Panthers. After that he was selected to go on the 2003 Kangaroo tour. Fitzgibbon played for the Roosters at second-row forward in their 2004 NRL grand final loss to cross-Sydney rivals, Canterbury-Bankstown. Fitzgibbon was selected in the Australian team to go and compete in the end of season 2004 Rugby League Tri-Nations tournament. In the final against Great Britain he played from the interchange bench and kicked two goals in the Kangaroos' 44–4 victory.

In 2006, Fitzgibbon succeeded Luke Ricketson as captain of the Sydney Roosters. On 12 August 2006, he became the highest scoring forward in premiership history, surpassing ex-Canberra Raiders back-rower David Furner. Fitzgibbon passed the previous record of 1218 points by converting winger Sam Perrett's third try in the 64th minute after beginning the match four points behind the Canberra forward. In August 2008, Fitzgibbon was named in the preliminary 46-man Kangaroos squad for the 2008 Rugby League World Cup, and in October 2008 he was selected in the final 24-man Australia squad. On 16 May 2009 it was announced that Craig had signed a one-year deal, with the option of a second year, with Super League side Hull F.C. for the 2010 season.

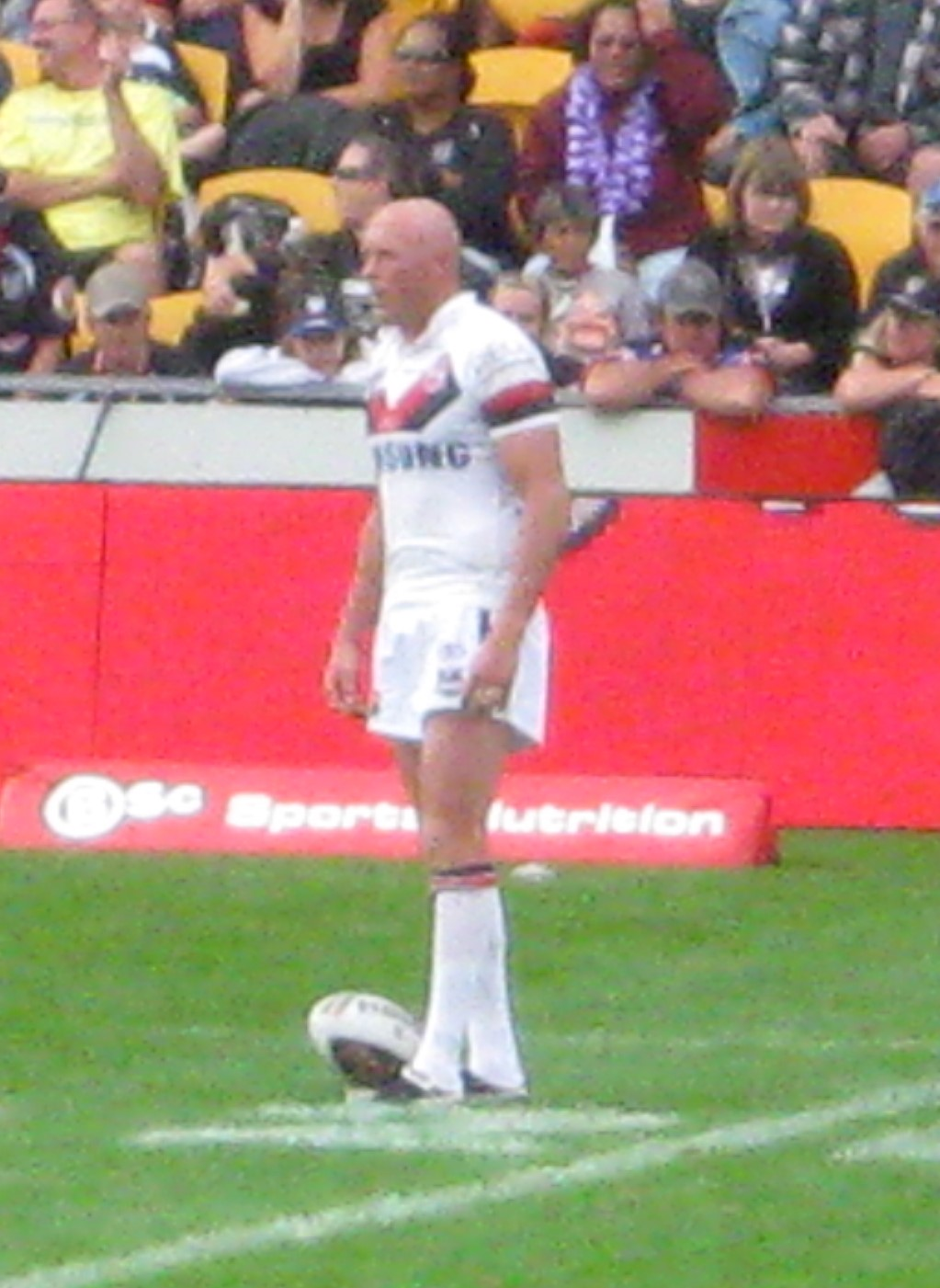
Craig Fitzgibbon lining up a conversion in 2009

=== Super League ===
Craig Fitzgibbon was selected for the Exiles squad for the International Origin match against England at Headingley on 10 June 2011. On 3 September 2011 Fitzgibbon suffered a fracture and ligament damage to his ankle and announced his retirement at the age of 34. On the 26 September announced he would return to the Sydney Roosters in 2012 as a part of its Coaching Staff.

=== Highlights ===
- Played in the 1999, 2000, 2002, 2003 & 2004 Grand Finals (scored 3 tries & kicked 9 goals for 30 points)
- Won the Clive Churchill Medal in the 2002 Grand Final
- Played 8 games for New South Wales 2003–2005 (scored one try & kicked 16 goals for 36 points)
- Played 15 games for Australia 2002–2005 (scored 3 tries & kicked 39 goals for 90 points)
- Played 4 games for Country vs. City 2002, 2004, 2005 & 2006
- Craig Fitzgibbon is the highest point scoring forward (1560 points)
- Has played 239 first grade games (scored 39 tries & kicked 700 goals for 1560 Points)
- Has kicked over 600 goals for the Sydney Roosters
- One of the last remaining Illawarra Steelers players (Along with Trent Barrett and Luke Patten)

== Coaching career ==
On 24 August 2015, Fitzgibbon was named as coach for the Country New South Wales rugby league team, replacing Trent Barrett for 2016. Fitzgibbon announced in April 2021 that he had signed a three-year contract to coach the Cronulla-Sutherland Sharks from 2022 onwards. Fitzgibbon was forced to miss coaching the Sharks' first game of the 2022 NRL season as he was in isolation due to contracting COVID-19. Assistant coach Steve Price deputized for him, with Fitzgibbon working remotely. In Fitzgibbon's first year as Cronulla head coach, he guided the club to a second place finish on the table which qualified the club for the finals. However, Cronulla would exit the finals series in disappointing fashion, going out in straight sets after losing to North Queensland in extra-time and then to South Sydney the following week.

On 14 February 2023, Fitzgibbon signed a five-year contract extension to remain as Cronulla's head coach until the end of the 2027 season. Fitzgibbon guided Cronulla to a sixth place finish in the 2023 NRL season. Cronulla would go on to be eliminated in the first week of the finals being upset by the Sydney Roosters 13-12. Fitzgibbon would lead Cronulla to a 4th place finish in the 2024 NRL season. Cronulla would lose the Qualifying Final against the Melbourne Storm 37-10. They would later win their semi final match against the North Queensland Cowboys 26-18. Cronulla would progress to the preliminary finals before losing to the Penrith Panthers 26-6. In the 2025 NRL season, Fitzgibbon guided Cronulla to 5th place on the table. Cronulla would then defeat the Sydney Roosters in week one of the finals before defeating the minor premiers Canberra to set up a preliminary final match against Melbourne. Cronulla would lose the game 22-14 falling short of the grand final for a second consecutive season. In the 2026 NRL season, Fitzgibbon guided Cronulla to a 5th placed finish on the table. The club would reach the semi-final stage before being eliminated by eventual premiers the Sydney Roosters.

| Preceded by Andrew Johns (Newcastle Knights) | Clive Churchill Medallist; 2002 | Succeeded by Luke Priddis (Penrith Panthers) |
| Preceded by Luke Ricketson | Sydney Roosters Captain; 2006–2008 | Succeeded by Braith Anasta |
