= Mark Edmondson (rugby league) =

English rugby league footballer

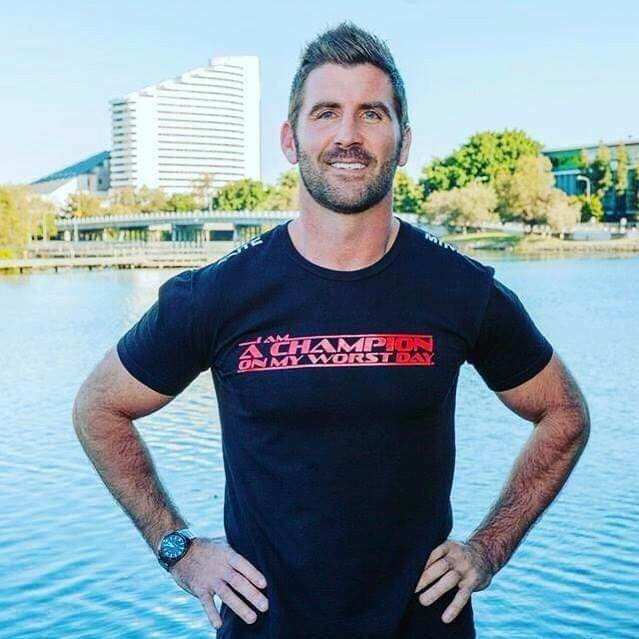
- A portrait photograph of Mark Edmondson

Personal information
- Born: 3 November 1979 (age 46) Lancaster, Lancashire, England

Playing information
- Position: Prop, Second-row
Club
Years	Team	Pld	T	G	FG	P
1999–05	St. Helens	119	16	0	0	64
2006	Sydney Roosters	2	0	0	0	0
2007	Salford City Reds	13	0	0	0	0
	Total	134	16	0	0	64
Representative
Years	Team	Pld	T	G	FG	P
2002	England A

Mark Edmondson (born 3 November 1979), also known by the nickname of "Edmo", is an English former rugby league footballer who played in the 1990s and 2000s.

== Background ==
Edmondson was born in Lancaster, Lancashire, England. He attended Morecambe Community High School.

== Career ==
Edmondson signed as a professional for Super League champions St. Helens at the age of 17 and played with the club until 2005 before leaving to play in Australia for the Sydney Roosters in the NRL.

Edmondson's time at St Helens coincided with one of the most successful periods in the history of the club. He was a member of the team that won the Grand Final against Bradford in October 1999. The club retained their Super League title in 2000 beating Wigan 29–16. They won the Challenge Cup in 2001; 13–6 over Bradford, with the final held at Twickenham Stadium for the first time, and the 2001 World Club Challenge, earning a 20–18 win over the Broncos. The club regained the Super League title in the 2002 Grand Final, Sean Long snatching a last minute 19–18 win over the Bradford with a drop—goal. In 2004, St Helens defeated Wigan 32–16 at the Millennium Stadium, Cardiff in front of a capacity crowd of 73,734 people to win the Challenge Cup,.

Edmondson played alongside some of Britain's greatest players such as Paul Sculthorpe, Sean Long, Keiron Cunningham, Paul Newlove, Chris Joynt, Tommy Martyn and Paul Wellens.

Edmondson represented the England International rugby league team and toured South Africa, Tonga, Fiji and Australia in 2002.

Edmondson was selected for the England team in 2005 but withdrew to undergo shoulder corrective surgery.

In 2006, Edmondson moved to Australia to join the Sydney Roosters coached by Ricky Stuart.

After pre-season shoulder reconstruction, Edmondson made his début for the Sydney Roosters against the Brisbane Broncos at Aussie Stadium, Sydney. Edmondson suffered further injuries and his contract with the Sydney Roosters was terminated in 2007.

After a period of rehabilitation for his injuries, Edmondson returned to England and signed for the Salford City Reds. He made his début against the Leeds Rhinos in round one of the Super League in 2007.

After further time out of the game with injury, Edmondson signed for the Castleford Tigers on 30 October 2007. He failed the club's medical and he retired from rugby league at the age of 28.

After retirement, Edmondson pursued courses in sport performance and established a consultancy to service high performance sport.
