= Daniel Dumas =

Australian rugby league footballer

Personal information
- Full name: Daniel Dumas
- Born: 17 February 1983 (age 42); Taree, New South Wales, Australia
- Height: 187 cm (6 ft 2 in)
- Weight: 96 kg (15 st 2 lb)

Playing information
- Position: Lock, Five-eighth, Second-row
Club
Years	Team	Pld	T	G	FG	P
2003–04	Cronulla Sharks	15	1	0	0	4
- Source: As of 21 January 2019

Daniel Dumas (born 17 February 1983) is an Australian former professional rugby league footballer who last played for the Sydney Roosters in the National Rugby League. His position of choice is in the second row though he has also played at lock and five-eighth.

== Biography ==
=== Early life ===
Dumas was born in Taree, New South Wales, Australia.

=== 2003 ===
Dumas originally was signed to the Cronulla side and gradually worked his way through the grades at the club, making his first grade debut in 2003.

=== 2004–2005 ===
Dumas played several games in the 2004 season impressing many with his hard hitting tackles and shoulder charges similar in nature to Sonny Bill Williams, his aggressive defence earned him a call up to the French international sevens side with teammate Dimitri Pelo. After an impressive start to his 2004 season he became injured with a serious season ending neck injury and he never was able to retain his spot in first grade for Cronulla-Sutherland. Mid-way through the 2005 season he left the club and signed for the Sydney Roosters.

=== 2006 ===
Dumas played in the 2006 NSW Cup grand final for Newtown who were the Sydney Roosters feeder club at the time against Parramatta. Newtown would lose the grand final 20–19 at Stadium Australia.

=== Later career ===
Since then, Dumas sacrificed his first grade career to raise a family. He spent several years as a player-coach in the Group Three competition on the Mid North Coast playing for clubs Port City Breakers and Taree City Bulls

=== Career highlights ===
- Junior Club: Taree Red Rovers
- First Grade Debut: Round 13, Cronulla v Warriors at Ericsson Stadium; 7 June 2003
- First Grade Record: 15 appearances scoring 1 try
- played 1 test for France in the 2003 rugby league Ashes series
