= Jon Aston =

Wales international rugby league footballer

Personal information
- Full name: Jon Aston
- Born: 5 June 1976 (age 48); Newport, Isle of Wight, England

Playing information
- Height: 6 ft 0 in (1.83 m)
- Weight: 16 st 7 lb (105 kg)
- Position: Prop, Second-row
Club
Years	Team	Pld	T	G	FG	P
1994–98	Hull FC	50	5	0	0	20
1998–00	Rochdale Hornets	49	7	0	0	28
2000–05	Hull Kingston Rovers	102	13	0	0	52
2006–07	Sheffield Eagles	11	0	0	0	0
	Total	212	25	0	0	100
Representative
Years	Team	Pld	T	G	FG	P
2003	Wales	2	0	0	0	0

Jon Aston (born 5 June 1976) is an English-born professional rugby league footballer who played in the 1990s and 2000s. He played at representative level for Wales, and at club level for Hull FC, Rochdale Hornets, Hull Kingston Rovers and Sheffield Eagles, as a prop, or second-row.

== Background ==
Jon Aston was born in Newport, Isle of Wight.

== International honours ==
Jon Aston won caps for Wales while at Hull Kingston Rovers 2003 1-cap + 1-cap (interchange/substitute).
