= Matt Blaymire =

English rugby league footballer

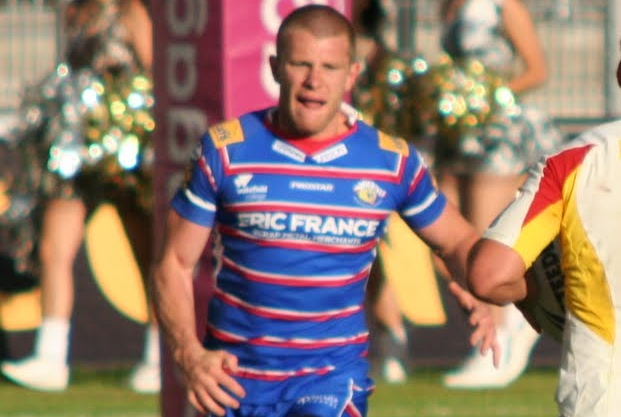

Personal information
- Full name: Matthew Blaymire
- Born: 4 June 1982 (age 44) Leeds, England

Playing information
- Height: 182 cm (6 ft 0 in)
- Weight: 94 kg (14 st 11 lb)
- Position: Fullback
Club
| Years | Team | Pld | T | G | FG | P |
|---|---|---|---|---|---|---|
| 2003–06 | York City Knights | 50 | 22 | 0 | 0 | 88 |
| 2007–11 | Wakefield Trinity | 106 | 30 | 0 | 1 | 121 |
| | Total | 156 | 52 | 0 | 1 | 209 |

Matt "Matty" Blaymire (born 4 June 1982) is an English former professional rugby league footballer who played in the 2000s and 2010s. He played at club level for York City Knights and Wakefield Trinity Wildcats as a fullback.

Blaymire was born in Leeds, West Yorkshire, England on 4 June 1982. He started his rugby league career in the Wakefield Trinity Wildcats academy before joining York City Knights in 2003, where he scored 22 tries in 50 appearances. After impressing for York, Blaymire returned to the Wakefield Trinity Wildcats at the end of the 2006's Super League XI. He spent five seasons at Wakefield Trinity Wildcats, making over 100 appearances for the club before being forced to retire in 2011 due to a knee injury.
