= Danny Sculthorpe =

English rugby league footballer

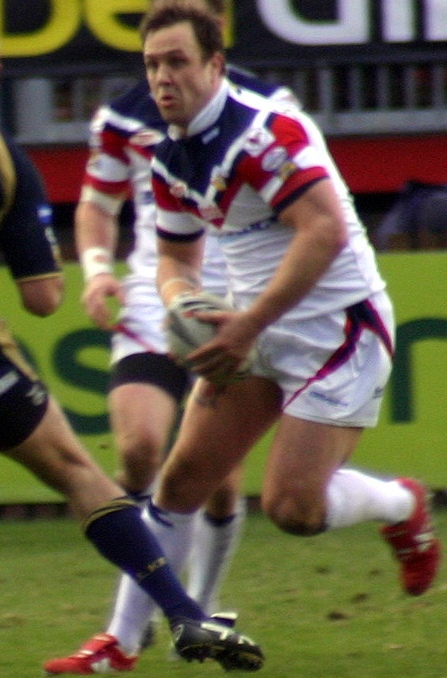

Personal information
- Full name: Daniel Sculthorpe
- Born: 8 September 1979 (age 45); Oldham, England

Playing information
- Height: 6 ft 3 in (1.91 m)
- Weight: 16 st 10 lb (106 kg)
- Position: Prop
Club
Years	Team	Pld	T	G	FG	P
1996–97	Leeds Rhinos	0	0	0	0	0
1997–98	Warrington Wolves	0	0	0	0	0
1998–01	Rochdale Hornets	83	6	0	2	26
2001–06	Wigan Warriors	72	8	0	0	32
2006–07	Castleford Tigers	19	4	0	1	17
2007–09	Wakefield Trinity Wildcats	48	2	0	0	8
2009(loan)	→ Huddersfield Giants	13	0	0	0	0
2011	Widnes Vikings	11	0	0	0	0
	Total	246	20	0	3	83
Representative
Years	Team	Pld	T	G	FG	P
2003	England A	3	0	0	0	0
2003	Lancashire	1	0	0	0	0
- Relatives: Paul Sculthorpe (brother)

Daniel Sculthorpe (born 8 September 1979), also known by the nickname "Scully", is an English former professional rugby league footballer. He last played as a prop for the Widnes Vikings. He also played for the Rochdale Hornets, Wigan Warriors, Castleford Tigers, Wakefield Trinity Wildcats, and the Huddersfield Giants.

== Background ==
Sculthorpe was born in Oldham, Greater Manchester, England. He is the younger brother of former player Paul Sculthorpe.

== Career ==
Sculthorpe started his career as an academy player at Leeds. In 1997, he was sold to Warrington as part of the £350,000 transfer of Iestyn Harris from Warrington to Leeds. In 1998, after being deemed surplus to requirements by Warrington, he was signed by Rochdale Hornets on a free transfer.

Sculthorpe was signed by Wigan Warriors in December 2001. He injured his back training with weights in January 2002, keeping him out of the Wigan first team squad. He returned to fitness with a four-week loan spell at his former club, Rochdale. Wigan coach Stuart Raper commented: "Danny is fit, but we've nowhere to play him. At Rochdale he's in an environment he'll be comfortable in and it will enable us to assess his return to fitness. It is another step on his road back to match action."

Raper's confidence in Sculthorpe was confirmed when he was recalled from Rochdale in September 2002. He made his first team début on his 23rd birthday, helping the Warriors to crush St Helens, a team that contained his brother Paul, 48-8 at the JJB Stadium. He consolidated his position as a first team regular during 2003. In 2004 Danny signed a new 3-year contract with Wigan despite speculation linking him with a move to St Helens. Assistant coach Denis Betts said: "I never had any doubt that Danny would stay here. He has developed into a top-quality player and we are pleased he has committed his future to us." He spent 2006's Super League XI on loan at Castleford Tigers from Wigan, before joining Wakefield Trinity Wildcats for 2007's Super League XII.

Sculthorpe joined Huddersfield Giants in a swap loan deal with Michael Korkidas, before moving on to Bradford. He failed to make a single appearance for Bradford after his diabetes forced him into taking a year off from the sport. His contract with Bradford ended and he quickly moved onto the Widnes Vikings in the Championship before leaving the club at the end of the 2011 season.

== International career ==
Danny toured South Africa in 2001 with the U21 England squad, coached by Wigan assistant coach John Kear. He was later named in the 2003 England A squad to face Australia, and to play in the European Nations Cup.

Sculthorpe was also picked to play for Lancashire in the 2003 Origin match.

== Personal life ==
Sculthorpe was diagnosed with diabetes as a teenager.

In 2015, Sculthorpe was awarded compensation for a training injury he suffered while at Bradford Bulls.
