= Paul Sculthorpe =

Former Great Britain & England international rugby league footballer

Paul Sculthorpe MBE
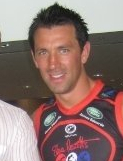

Personal information
- Full name: Paul Sculthorpe
- Born: 22 September 1977 (age 48) Burnley, Lancashire, England

Playing information
- Height: 6 ft 3 in (1.91 m)
- Weight: 15 st 12 lb (101 kg)
- Position: Loose forward, Stand-off, Second-row
Club
Years	Team	Pld	T	G	FG	P
1995–97	Warrington Wolves	78	17	0	1	69
1997–08	St Helens	261	113	392	10	1246
	Total	339	130	392	11	1315
Representative
Years	Team	Pld	T	G	FG	P
1996–01	England	4	4	0	0	16
1996–06	Great Britain	26	5	3	2	28
2001–02	Lancashire	3	1	0	0	4
- Education: Counthill School
- Relatives: Danny Sculthorpe (brother)

Paul Sculthorpe MBE (born 22 September 1977) is an English former professional rugby league footballer who played as a loose forward, stand-off or second-row forward in the 1990s and 2000s. He began his club career at the Warrington Wolves before joining St Helens, with whom he won four Grand Finals, four Challenge Cups and two World Club Challenges, as well as becoming the first player to win the Man of Steel Award in two consecutive seasons. He played for England and Great Britain at international level, as well as representing Lancashire. He is the older brother of former player Danny Sculthorpe.

== Early years ==
Sculthorpe was born on 22 September 1977 in Burnley, Lancashire, England. He grew up in Oldham, and was educated at Thorp County Primary School, Royton until the age of 10, completing his primary education at Watersheddings Primary School and then Counthill School. He played junior rugby league for Royton Tigers, then Oldham Juniors, Mayfield and Waterhead. He moved to Ince Rosebridge after a disagreement with his teammates regarding a Southern Hemisphere tour. He played for the Wigan club for two years, then started his professional career with Warrington, making his debut in 1995.

In 1996, he was named in the inaugural Super League Dream Team, and in the post season he went on the 1996 Great Britain Lions tour of Oceania.

Sculthorpe moved to St Helens in 1997 for £375,000, at the time a record transfer fee for a forward (based on increases in average earnings, this would be approximately £745,690.28 in 2025).

In the 1997 post season, Sculthorpe was selected to play for Great Britain at loose forward in all three matches of the Super League Test series against Australia.

== St Helens ==
Sculthorpe played for St Helens as a stand-off in their 1999 Super League Grand Final victory over Bradford Bulls. Having won the 1999 Championship, St Helens contested in the 2000 World Club Challenge against National Rugby League Premiers Melbourne Storm, with Sculthorpe playing as a loose forward in the loss. He also played at loose forward and kicked a drop goal in their 2000 Super League Grand Final victory over Wigan. As Super League V champions, St Helens played against 2000 NRL Premiers Brisbane Broncos in the 2001 World Club Challenge. Sculthorpe played at loose forward, scoring a try and kicking a drop goal in Saints' victory.

Sculthorpe was named as Man of Steel in 2001 and 2002. He was Saints’ sole representative in the 2002 Super League Dream Team, a feat he repeated in 2004. Sculthorpe played for St Helens at stand-off in their 2002 Super League Grand Final victory against Bradford. Having won Super League VI, St Helens contested the 2003 World Club Challenge against 2002 NRL Premiers Sydney Roosters. Sculthorpe played at loose forward in Saints' 38–0 loss.

Sculthorpe was named St Helens captain in 2004, and led the team to victory over Wigan in the 2004 Challenge Cup Final at the Millennium Stadium, Cardiff. That year he also joined a select band of players to have scored 100 tries and 100 goals in Super League. In the end of season 2004 Rugby League Tri-Nations tournament, in the final against Australia he played at loose forward in the Lions' 44–4 loss.

In 2005 Sculthorpe scored his 1,000th point for Saints.He was named as Great Britain captain in 2005, although injury ruled out for the most of 2005's Super League X and prevented him from leading the side in the 2005 Tri-Nations tournament.

As one of the stars of the world game, Sculthorpe secured a lucrative sponsorship deal as the face of Gillette, which at the time was the most lucrative sponsorship deal made by any rugby league player worldwide. In March 2006, Sculthorpe signed a deal with Random House to publish his autobiography, Man of Steel, which was published in August 2007. Sculthorpe captained St Helens as a second-row in their 2006 Challenge Cup Final victory against Huddersfield. However his time as Great Britain captain was less successful, as he only ever captained the side for 18 minutes. This came in the one-off test game at Knowsley Road in 2006 between Great Britain and New Zealand, in which he was forced off after injuring his knee. Sculthorpe returned from the injury and was named man-of-the-match in St Helens' win over Brisbane Broncos in the 2007 World Club Challenge. In September 2007 he signed a new 12-month contract with St Helens which saw him celebrate his testimonial season at the club.

Sculthorpe's final game for St Helens was in the 2008 Challenge Cup Final, where he injured his shoulder in the opening minutes. After being injury hit in 2008's Super League XIII with only a handful of games played, St. Helens announced they would release Sculthorpe at the end of the season. He was touted as a potential signing for Salford, or joining up with brother Danny at Wakefield Trinity in time for the 2009 Super League season. However, Sculthorpe announced his retirement from the game on 19 September 2008.

He was awarded the honour of MBE in the 2013 New Year's Honours List, for "services to Rugby League and to charity". On 9 September 2024, Sculthorpe was inducted into the Rugby Football League Hall of Fame.
