= Brick Community Stadium =

Stadium in Greater Manchester, England

The Brick Community Stadium
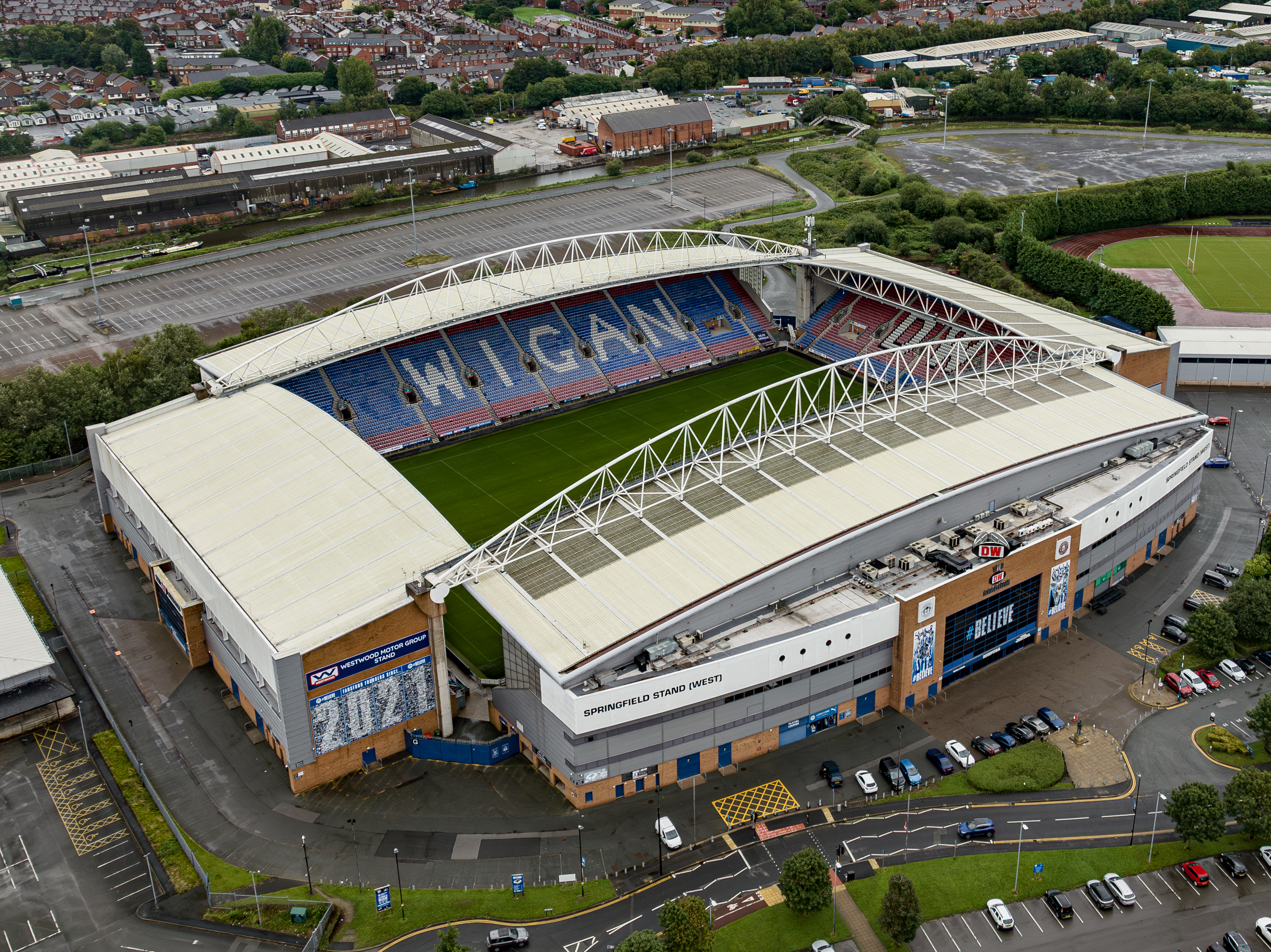
- Interactive map of The Brick Community Stadium
- Full name: The Brick Community Stadium
- Former names: JJB Stadium (1999–2009); DW Stadium; (2009–2024)
- Location: Loire Drive, Robin Park, Wigan WN5 0UH
- Coordinates: 53°32′52″N 2°39′14″W
- Owner: Wigan Sporting Events Limited
- Operator: Wigan Sporting Events Limited
- Capacity: 25,138
- Surface: Grass
- Record attendance: Football: 25,133 vs. Manchester United in 2008; Rugby League: 25,011 Great Britain vs. Australia in 2001
- Field size: 105 by 68 metres (115 yd × 74 yd)

Construction
- Built: 1999
- Opened: 6 August 1999
- Cost: £30m
- Builder: Alfred McAlpine

Tenants
- Wigan Athletic (1999–present); Wigan Warriors (1999–present); Orrell (1999–2000)

The Brick Community Stadium is a multi-use stadium in Robin Park in Wigan, Greater Manchester, England. It is used by Wigan Warriors rugby league club and Wigan Athletic football club. The stadium is owned by local businessman, Mike Danson, who owns both Wigan Athletic and the Wigan Warriors.

Built and opened in 1999, it was initially the JJB Stadium after its main sponsor. In UEFA matches, it was called Wigan Athletic Stadium due to UEFA regulations on sponsorship. From 2009 to 2024, it was renamed the DW Stadium, and from 13 May 2024, it was again renamed, this time as the Brick Community Stadium, reflecting a partnership with a local charity.

The stadium was built by Alfred McAlpine. Wigan Athletic and Wigan Warriors moved into it from their long-term homes of Springfield Park and Central Park respectively. International rugby league matches have also taken place at the venue.

Its current capacity is 25,138—seated in four single-tier stands—and its record attendance was on 11 May 2008 when 25,133 people watched Wigan Athletic play Manchester United in the final match of the 2007–08 Premier League season.

== History ==
=== JJB Stadium era ===
The stadium was built by Alfred McAlpine and completed in August 1999.

Wigan Athletic had spent the previous 67 years playing at Springfield Park, and their first match at what was initially called the JJB Stadium was a friendly against Morecambe, just before the stadium's official opening.

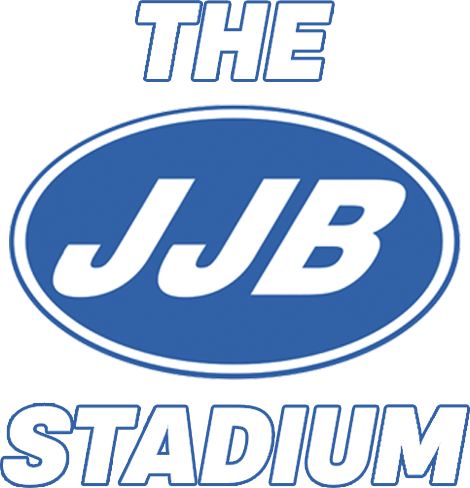
The JJB Stadium logo (1999–2009)

The stadium's inauguration was marked with a friendly between Wigan Athletic and neighbours Manchester United – who were then reigning European champions, Premier League champions and FA Cup holders – with United's manager Sir Alex Ferguson officially opening the stadium.

The first competitive football match there took place on 7 August 1999, with Wigan Athletic facing Scunthorpe United in a Second Division match. Simon Haworth scored twice, including the first competitive goal at the new stadium, as Athletic won 3–0.

Wigan Warriors moved to the stadium a month after it opened, once they had played their final home game of the 1999 regular season at Central Park, which had been the club's home since 1902. After their former ground was sold, the possibility of ground sharing with Bolton Wanderers at the Reebok Stadium (Now the Toughsheet Community Stadium) was presented, but the new stadium in Wigan was chosen instead. Their first game there was a play-off match against Castleford Tigers, which they lost, on 19 September. The Warriors did not lose a competitive match at the stadium in 2001 and 2020.

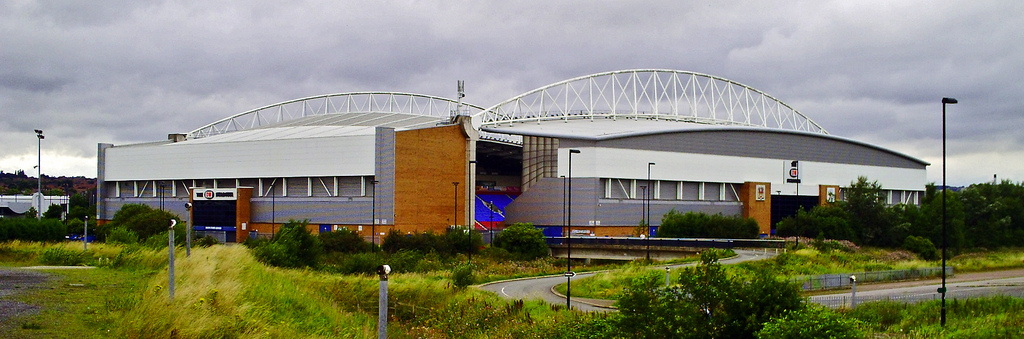
A view of the DW Stadium, from the bridge crossing the Leeds and Liverpool Canal

The first away team to win a competitive football match at the stadium was Wigan Athletic. A first round FA Cup tie against non-league Cambridge City was played there due to City's ground being deemed unsuitable to host the tie. Wigan played in their changed strip and used the away dressing room since it was technically a 'home' game for Cambridge City. A Stuart Barlow brace secured the win for Wigan.

On 7 March 2005, Greater Manchester police announced that they would stop policing Wigan Athletic matches at the stadium from 2 April. This move would almost certainly have resulted in the stadium's safety certificate being revoked, effectively forcing the team to play behind closed doors. The move was part of an ongoing dispute between the police force and Dave Whelan surrounding £300,000 in unpaid policing costs. The police's decision would not have affected Wigan Warriors, whose games are stewarded instead of policed. The situation was temporarily resolved on 8 March with both sides reaching an agreement that would allow Athletic to play at the ground until the end of the season. Four months later, Wigan Athletic, facing the prospect of playing their home games in the Premier League in an empty stadium, grudgingly paid the money they owed to the police. The club successfully appealed against the payments in court and won damages from the police.

On 7 September 2008, Wigan Warriors revealed plans to take their Super League Play-Off against Bradford Bulls to a neutral venue. The controversial relocation was forced due to a fixture clash, with a match between football clubs Wigan Athletic and Sunderland to take place less than 24 hours after the Super League match. Whelan, who controlled Wigan Athletic, refused permission for the Warriors to stage their elimination at the stadium, citing concerns over the playing surface. The game was relocated to Widnes Vikings home ground, the Stobart Stadium. In the same season, JJB Sports announced they would not continue to sponsor Wigan Warriors, leaving them without a main shirt sponsor.

The stadium's average attendance has increased significantly since its opening in 1999. The Wigan Warriors' average attendance has increased by 32.5% from its first full season at the stadium in 2000, and Wigan Athletic's average attendance has increased by 181.2% from the 2000–01 season. The highest recorded attendance for a rugby league match is shared between three fixtures; the Wigan Warriors' fixture against St Helens R.F.C. on 25 March 2005; Game 4 of the 2005 Tri-Nations series between Great Britain and Australia on 6 November; and Game 5 of the 2004 Tri-Nations series between Great Britain and Australia on 13 November at 25,004 each. The highest recorded football attendance at the stadium was Wigan Athletic's home fixture against Manchester United on 11 May 2008—the final day of the 2007–08 Premier League season—with 25,133 fans attending. This is the stadium's highest recorded overall attendance to date, and was the match where Manchester United were crowned Premier League champions for that season.

=== DW Stadium era ===
The DW Stadium logo 2009–2018

In March 2009, Dave Whelan acquired a chain of fitness clubs from JJB Sports. In the process, Whelan used the business to set up a new venture, DWSportsfitness and announced that the stadium name would change to the DW Stadium in August. Whelan also announced that at the same time the stadium was renamed, its ownership would pass from himself to Wigan Athletic. Concerns about the future of Wigan Warriors were arrested in the same announcement, as Whelan extended the lease on the stadium by 50 years for the rugby league team. Before their match against Leeds Rhinos in July 2009, both clubs were given the opportunity to rename one stand, with the intention of renaming them in honour to a recognised player from each club's history. The rugby league club were granted the East Stand, which they renamed 'The Boston Stand' in tribute to the Welsh wing Billy Boston, As Wigan Athletic had spent many years in the lower leagues it was recognised that most of their players were not known, so the West Stand was renamed 'The Springfield Stand' after the club's former ground.

In August 2020 it announced that DW Sports was to enter administration. Later that month it was announced that Frasers Group would buy "certain" assets from DW Sports Fitness for £37m, but would not be using the firm's brand name.

The match of 8 October 2022 against Cardiff City was controversial when it turned out one goal was bigger than the other. The match went ahead when officials ruled that there was no advantage to either team as they changed ends at half-time. Cardiff won 3–1.

=== The Brick Community Stadium era ===
From 13 May 2024, the stadium was renamed The Brick Community Stadium, following a partnership with a local Wigan charity, The Brick, which works to address poverty and homelessness. The name will remain in place until the end of 2025; Wigan Athletic and Wigan Warriors committed to securing a long-term commercial stadium partner for 2026 and beyond.

== Structure and facilities ==
The stadium design is based on cantilevered, prefabricated steel roof and terrace structuring. It is an all-seater arena with a seating capacity of 25,138. The stands are rectangular and both the northern and southern stands have supporting steel girders suspended from beneath the roof. The four stands are of approximately the same height, however the stadium is not totally enclosed, leaving four exposed corners.

The seats are a mixture of both resident teams' main colours of red and blue. The stadium is fully compliant with safety guidelines for a sports ground.

The stadium also has facilities and access for up to 90 fans with disabilities, with facilities for partially sighted fans.

The pitch is large enough to conform with both FIFA and the standard rugby league requirements, at 6,110 by 5,460 metres (6,680 yd × 5,970 yd). This leaves an in-goal area just 5 metres (5.5 yd) deep for rugby matches. It is mostly made of natural grass, with 2% of the pitch composed of synthetics to provide stability. The ground has irrigation, and an under-heating system to resist icy weather.

=== Boston Stand (east) ===
Capacity – 8,238
The Boston Stand, named after Wigan Warriors legend Billy Boston, runs parallel to the western 'Springfield Stand' along the side of the pitch. The Boston Stand is the largest stand in the stadium, holding an electronic scoreboard and has WIGAN spelt out in the seats and has been occupied by the home fans since 2005.

=== Springfield Stand (west) ===
Capacity – 6,100
The Springfield Stand, named after Wigan Athletic's former ground Springfield Park contains the stadium's vital facilities; four dressing rooms, benches, a doping control room and a treatment room for the players, as well as four executive boxes, ten radio commentary points and a designated TV studio.

=== Heatable South Stand (south) ===
Capacity – 5,400
The South Stand was named the "Leam Richardson stand" in November 2021, after Wigan Athletic striker Charlie Wyke collapsed during training after suffering a cardiac arrest. Following his discharge from hospital Wyke praised Richardson's swift initiation of CPR saying: "...my life has been saved by the actions of the gaffer [Leam Richardson] and the club doctor Jonathan Tobin...". It is used to seat the home fans behind the goal, opposite to the away fans in the North Stand. In January 2024, the stand was renamed as the "Heatable South Stand", for the remainder of the 2023/24, and 2024/25 seasons, as part of a multi year deal.

=== North Stand ===
Capacity- 5,400
At both Wigan Athletic and Wigan Warriors matches, away supporters are situated in the North Stand behind the goal. Occasionally, during rugby games which attract low away support, the 5,400 capacity North Stand is closed altogether, and the away fans who attend are put into an alternative stand.

== Attendances ==
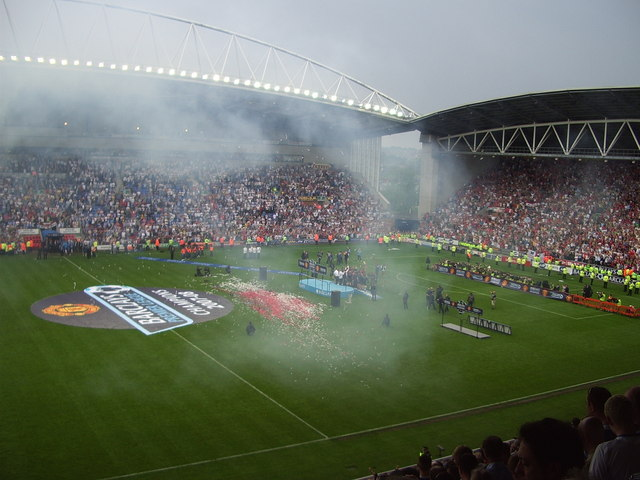
The record attendance at the DW Stadium was on the final day of the 2007–08 Premier League, where Manchester United were crowned champions after beating Wigan Athletic in front of a crowd of 25,133

=== Wigan Athletic FC ===
Wigan Athletic's success has improved considerably since their move to the stadium from Springfield Park in 1999. The club subsequently climbed up two divisions to play in the Premier League from 2005 until 2013.

Year	Attendance	
Year	Average	Highest
2000–01 [D3]	6,861	10,048 (vs. Bristol City)
2001–02 [D3]	5,771	7,783 (vs. Tranmere Rovers)
2002–03 [D2]	7,288	12,783 (vs. Oldham Athletic)
2003–04 [D1]	9,526	20,669 (vs. West Ham United)
2004–05 [C]	11,155	20,745 (vs. Sunderland)
2005–06 [PL]	20,610	25,023 (vs. Liverpool)
2006–07 [PL]	18,159	24,726 (vs. West Ham United)
2007–08 [PL]	19,046	25,133 (vs. Manchester United)
2008–09 [PL]	18,413	22,954 (vs. Arsenal)
2009–10 [PL]	18,006	22,113 (vs. Arsenal)
2010–11 [PL]	16,812	22,043 (vs. West Ham United)
2011–12 [PL]	18,633	22,187 (vs. Newcastle United)
2012–13 [PL]	19,359	24,001 (vs. Aston Villa)
2013–14 [C]	15,177	19,226 (vs. Bolton Wanderers)
2014–15 [C]	12,882	16,347 (vs. Middlesbrough)
2015–16 [L1]	9,467	18,730 (vs. Barnsley)
2016–17 [C]	11,722	15,280 (vs. Leeds United)
2017–18 [L1]	9,152	19,242 (vs. Manchester City)
2018–19 [C]	11,661	15,665 (vs. Norwich City)
2019–20 [C]	10,592	14,819 (vs. Leeds United)
2020–21 [L1]	0	0
2021–22 [L1]	10,397	20,136 (vs. Sunderland)
2022–23 [C]	11,939	17,788 (vs. Rotherham United)
2023–24 [L1]	10,955	22,870 (vs. Manchester United)
2024-25 [L1]	9,946	15,445 (vs. Bolton Wanderers)
2025-26 [L1]	9,974	16,710 (vs. Bradford City)
PL = Premier League, C = EFL Championship, L1 = EFL League One D1 = Football League First Division, D2 = Football League Second Division, D3 = Football League Third Division

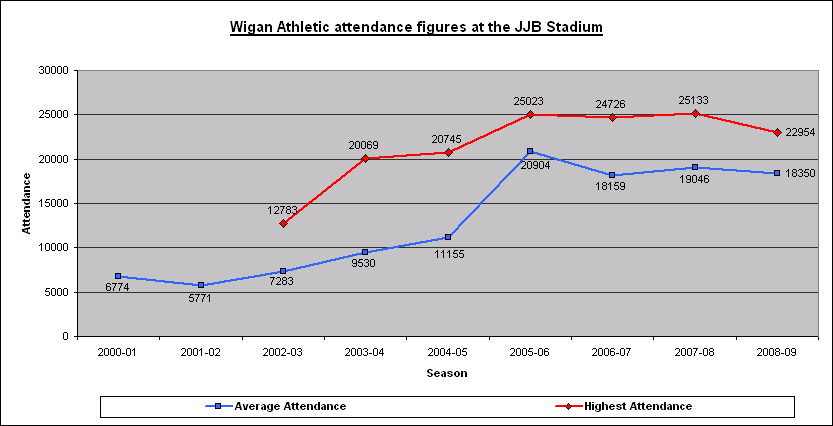
Average and highest attendances for Wigan Athletic at the stadium between the 2000–01 and 2008–09 seasons

Rising success on the pitch has been met with increased attendances. Promotion into the Premier League meant that in their first season of English top-flight football, Wigan Athletic's average home attendance almost doubled from the season before. Over three times more fans attended matches at the stadium during Wigan's 2007–08 season in the Premier League than had attended in the 2001–02 season when Wigan Athletic were in the Football League Second Division. Wigan Athletic's average home attendance for 2007–08 was the lowest out of all 20 teams in the Premier League, failing to make the top 30 English clubs in terms of attendance. The same season saw the highest ever attendance at the stadium, when 25,133 people witnessed Wigan play Manchester United on the final day of the season.

Wigan Athletic's average attendance was again the lowest in the league for the 2008–09 Premier League season. Premier League attendances fell on average by around 426 per club during the 2008–09 season. Wigan Athletic's home attendance fell by more than this, with their average attendance for the 2008–09 season falling by 633 from the season before. The highest attendance at the stadium for this season was a match between Wigan Athletic and Arsenal F.C., in which 22,954 people were counted. This attendance was 2,357 fans lower than the highest attendance in the season before.

=== Wigan Warriors R.L.F.C. ===
Wigan Warriors moved from Central Park to the stadium in 1999 after the end of Super League IV's regular season. Since moving to the new stadium, Wigan Warriors' success in rugby league has seen them win the Super League Grand Final on 6 occasions, the World Club Challenge on 2 occasions at this stadium and the Challenge Cup on 4 occasions.

Year	Attendance	
Year	Average	Highest
1999 [SL]^{[A]}	13,374	13,374 (vs. Castleford Tigers)
2000 [SL]	11,329	19,186 (vs. St Helens R.F.C.)
2001 [SL]	11,803	21,073 (vs. St Helens R.F.C.)
2002 [SL]	10,480	18,789 (vs. St Helens R.F.C.)
2003 [SL]	11,217	21,790 (vs. St Helens R.F.C.)
2004 [SL]	13,333	20,052 (vs. St Helens R.F.C.)
2005 [SL]	13,894	25,004 (vs. St Helens R.F.C.)
2006 [SL]	14,464	18,358 (vs. St Helens R.F.C.)
2007 [SL]	16,040	24,028 (vs. St Helens R.F.C.)
2008 [SL]	13,955	19,958 (vs. St Helens R.F.C.)
2009 [SL]	14,080	22,232 (vs. St Helens R.F.C.)
2010 [SL]	15,181	22,701 (vs. Warrington Wolves)
2011 [SL]	17,193	24,268 (vs. St George-Illawarra; WCC)
2012 [SL]	16,042	21,522 (vs. St Helens R.F.C.)
2013 [SL]	14,544	23,861 (vs. St Helens R.F.C.)
2014 [SL]	14,101	20,265 (vs. Leeds Rhinos)
2015 [SL]	13,980	24,054 (vs. St Helens R.F.C.)
2016 [SL]	13,281	20,049 (vs. St Helens R.F.C.)
2017 [SL]	13,669	23,390 (vs. St Helens R.F.C.)
2018 [SL]	11,648	16,047 (vs. St Helens R.F.C.)
2019 [SL]	11,432	22,050 (vs. St Helens R.F.C.)
2020 [SL]	12,222	15,040 (vs. Warrington Wolves)
2021 [SL]	8,536*	16,390 (vs. St Helens R.F.C.)
2022 [SL]	12,278	19,210 (vs. St Helens R.F.C.)
2023 [SL]	13,497	24,275 (vs. St Helens R.F.C.)
2024 [SL]	14,910	24,091 (vs. Penrith Panthers)
2025 [SL]	17,088	24,294 (vs. St Helens)
SL = Super League |*Covid restricted attendances

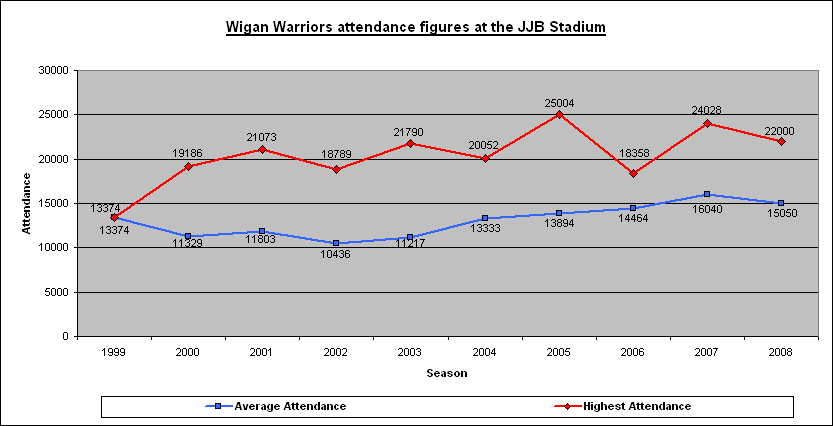
Average and highest attendances for the Wigan Warriors at the stadium between 1999 and 2008

Attendances have generally risen for the Wigan Warriors since the start of the 2002 season, averaging around 14,000 over the three seasons from 2006 to 2009. Aside from Grand Finals, the largest Super League attendance was recorded at the stadium in 2005 when Wigan Warriors played their local rivals, St Helens R.F.C.

This match is also the highest home attendance in the Wigan Warriors' history at the stadium. The twenty thousand mark has been broken 17 times since moving to the new stadium, 12 times against St Helens RLFC, once against local rivals Warrington Wolves in the opening round of the 2008 Super League XIII season, and once in July 2009 against the Leeds Rhinos following a campaign advertising the game as the 'Big One'. The 20,000 attendance mark has also been surpassed in World Club Challenge fixtures against NRL clubs St George-Illawarra in 2011, Cronulla Sharks in 2017, and Sydney Roosters in 2019. In 2010, the Warriors were officially the biggest supported team in the Super League.

== Other events ==
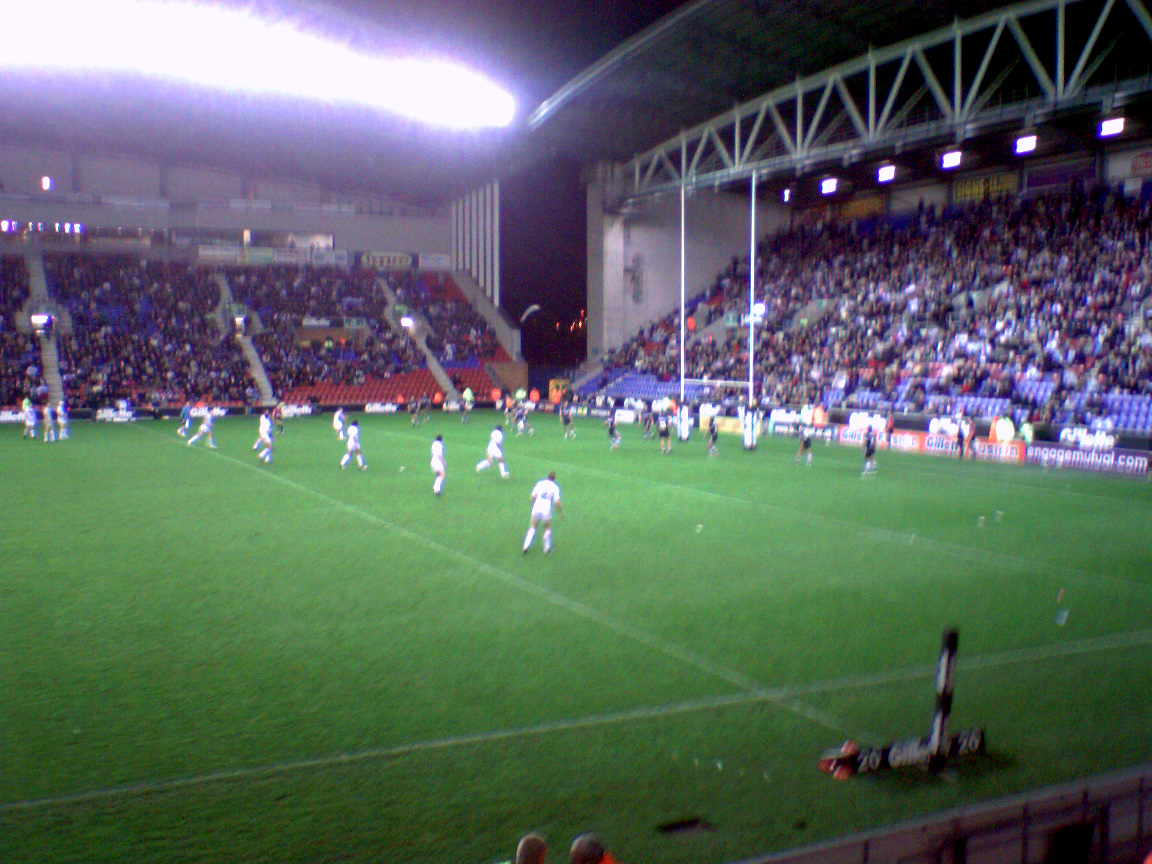
The final home Test for Great Britain against New Zealand, played at the stadium in 2007

As well as the fixtures for the two domestic teams, the stadium is a venue for international rugby league. Since the stadium's construction in 1999, it has been an ever-present venue whenever International series have been played in England.

Its first involvement came during the 2004 series, where the home Great Britain and Ireland national team defeated the Australians 24–12, with Terry Newton and Andy Farrell both scoring in their home town of Wigan. The venue was again selected for the 2005 series, and again the match was between Great Britain and Australia—this time the home team lost 6–20—with Greater Manchester born Adrian Morley scoring Great Britain's solitary try. Both matches were complete sell-outs, each having attendances above 25,000. The match in 2004 was the third highest attendance of the series, coming behind a match at the City of Manchester Stadium between Great Britain and Australia, and the series final between the same two teams at Elland Road.

In addition to the Tri-Nations, the stadium has also played host to visiting nations during their European tours. Australia played Great Britain in front of a sell-out crowd during the 2001 Kangaroo tour, with the home side losing 8–28. Australia narrowly defeated Great Britain again in 2003 at the stadium, winning by a margin of four points during their 2003 European Tour. New Zealand have also played at the stadium during their tours. In 2002, a try scored in his home town by Martin Gleeson helped Great Britain to defeat the 'Kiwis' 16–10. The visitors lost again during their 2007 tour, this time 28–22 in a closely fought game in which Wigan-born second-row Sean O'Loughlin featured.

The stadium has hosted the World Club Challenge four times, in 2000, between St. Helens and the Melbourne Storm in 2011 when Wigan took on St. George Illawarra Dragons. and in 2015 and 2016 when Wigan Warriors hosted the Brisbane Broncos.

In 2025, the stadium hosted the Women's Super League Grand Final between Wigan Warriors and St Helens.

=== Rugby league test matches ===
Since its opening in 1999, the stadium has hosted a number of rugby league internationals.

Date	Team 1	Result	Team 2	Event	Attendance
24 November 2001	Great Britain	8–28	Australia	2001 Kangaroo tour	25,011
23 November 2002	Great Britain	16–10	New Zealand	2002 Kiwi tour	22,247
8 November 2003	Great Britain	18–22	Australia	2003 Kangaroo tour	24,614
13 November 2004	Great Britain	24–12	Australia	2004 Tri-Nations	25,004
6 November 2005	Great Britain	6–20	Australia	2005 Tri-Nations	25,004
10 November 2007	Great Britain	28–22	New Zealand	2007 All Golds tour	21,235
9 November 2009	England	16–26	Australia	2009 Four Nations	23,122
1 November 2013	England	34–6	France	2013 World Cup quarter-final	22,276
14 November 2015	England	20–14	New Zealand	2015 Kiwi tour	24,741
5 November 2022	England Women	54–4	Canada Women	2021 World Cup group stage	23,179 (double header)
5 November 2022	England	46–6	Papua New Guinea	2021 World Cup quarter-final	23,179 (double header)
27 October 2024	England	34–18	Samoa	2024 Samoa tour	15,137

== Surroundings ==
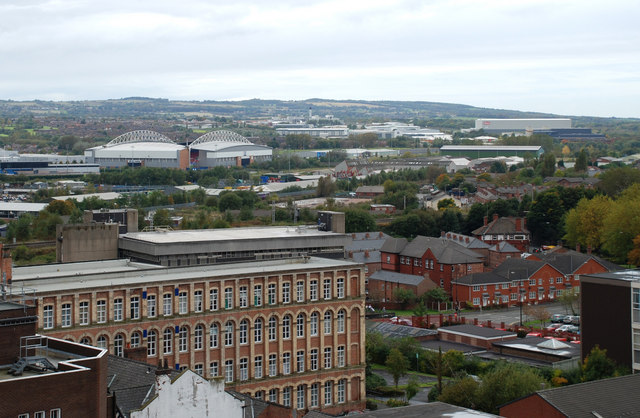
The Wigan skyline, featuring the stadium

The stadium's surroundings are mostly urban, as it is located in the north of Wigan's Robin Park retail complex in the western suburb of Newtown, on the south bank of the River Douglas, west of the Miry Lane industrial estate. The stadium's car parks are situated around the canal, and can hold up to 2,500 cars.

The main road serving the complex is the A49, running east-bound from the M6 motorway, junction 26, 750 metres (820 yd) south of the stadium. Both of the Wigan railway stations, Wigan Wallgate and Wigan North Western lie 1.3–1.6 kilometres (0.8–1.0 mi) east of the stadium.

=== Robin Park Arena and Sports Centre ===
Robin Park Arena and Sports Centre consists of two facilities; Robin Park Arena, an outdoor football/rugby and athletics stadium, and Robin Park Sports Centre, an indoor multi-sports facility.

==== Robin Park Arena ====
Robin Park Arena
- Interactive map of Robin Park Arena
- Location: Wigan, Greater Manchester
- Coordinates: 53°32′47″N 2°39′05″W
- Capacity: 1,000

Tenants
- Wigan Warriors (training base; 2019–present); Wigan Warriors Reserves (2019–present); Wigan Warriors Women (2019–2025); Wigan Robin Park F.C. (2005–2015); Wigan Harriers Athletics Club (????–present)

Located adjacent to the Brick Community Stadium's South Stand lies the Robin Park Arena, which is operated by Wigan Warriors and has a seating capacity of 1,000 spectators. The arena is mainly used as the indoor and outdoor training ground for Wigan Warriors and also athletics. It also houses Wigan Warriors club shop, selling merchandise. The ground hosted the club's women's fixtures until their move to Edge Hall Road in 2026.

The ground was formerly used as a home venue for North West Counties Football League side Wigan Robin Park, and Wigan Athletic Reserves.

In May 2026, the ground hosted an RFL 1895 Cup quarter-final between Widnes Vikings and Newcastle Thunder.

==== Robin Park Sports Centre ====
Robin Park Sports Centre
- Interactive map of Robin Park Sports Centre
- Location: Wigan, Greater Manchester
- Coordinates: 53°32′46″N 2°39′18″W

Tenant
- Wigan Warriors Wheelchair (2022–present)

Located across the road from the Brick Community Stadium, The Robin Park Sports Centre is home to Wigan Warriors Wheelchair team and has hosted the 2024 wheelchair rugby league European Club Challenge, in addition to a 2024 international between England and France. The arena hosted the 2026 Wheelchair Challenge Cup final.

Wheelchair rugby league test matches

Date	Team 1	Result	Team 2	Event	Attendance
26 October 2024	England	66–33	France	Fassolette-Kielty Trophy	598

== See also ==
- List of English football stadia by capacity
- List of English rugby league stadia by capacity

== Notes ==
^{A} Wigan Warriors played one match in 1999 at the new stadium after moving from their former Central Park ground—an elimination play-off match against the Castleford Tigers.
