= 2011 Penrith Panthers season =

- NRL rank: 12th
- 2011 record: Wins: 8; draws: 0; losses: 16
- Points scored: For: 430; against: 517

Team information
- CEO: Michael Leary
- Coach: Matthew Elliott -> Steve Georgallis
- Captain: Petero Civoniceva
- Stadium: Centrebet Stadium
- Avg. attendance: 12,299

Top scorers
- Tries: Lachlan Coote – 12; David Simmons – 12
- Goals: Michael Gordon – 25
- Points: Michael Gordon – 66
← 2010	2012 →

The 2011 Penrith Panthers season is the 45th in the club's history. They are competing in the NRL's 2011 Telstra Premiership. This year saw Phil Gould appointed as the Penrith Panthers' new football operations manager.

== 2011 Players and Coaching staff ==
= Injured
(SE) – Season Ending Injury

No.

Position
Player

416 Luke Lewis – LK 431 Trent Waterhouse – SR 456 Michael Gordon – WG (GK) (SE) 457 Matthew Bell – PR 461 Nathan Smith – LK 463 Michael Jennings – CE 464 Tim Grant – PR 472 Petero Civoniceva (captain) – PR 473 Brad Tighe – CE 476 Joseph Paulo – LK 477 Sam McKendry – PR 480 Masada Iosefa – HK 481 Lachlan Coote – FB (GK) 506 Luke Walsh – HB (GK) 513 Adrian Purtell – WG

No.

Position
Player

514 Travis Burns – FE (GK) 515 Kevin Kingston – HK 518 Sandor Earl – WG (SE) David Simmons – WG Arana Taumata – FE Nafe Seluini – HK Yileen Gordon – CE Michael Worrincy – SR Timana Tahu – CE (SE) Sarafu Fatiaki – CE Nigel Plum – SR Brendon Gibb – SR Tim Winitana – CE Dayne Weston – PR

- Panthers Group CEO: Glenn Matthews
- Rugby League CEO: Unknown
- Head coach: Steve Georgallis
- Rugby League Marketing Manager: Shannon Donato
- Media Manager: Andrew Farrell
- Coaching, Development and Recruitment Manager: Jim Jones
- Stadium Operations Manager: Tamara Van Antwerpen

== Transfers ==
Gains

Player	Previous club
Arana Taumata	North Queensland Cowboys
Michael Worrincy	Bradford Bulls
Dayne Weston	North Queensland Cowboys
Nafe Seluini	New Zealand Warriors
Yileen Gordon	Canterbury-Bankstown Bulldogs
Brendon Gibb	Norths Devils
Junior Paulo	St. George Illawarra Dragons
Tim Winitana	Canterbury-Bankstown Bulldogs
Timana Tahu	Parramatta Eels
Junior Vaivai	South Sydney Rabbitohs

Losses

Player	New club
Shane Elford	Retired
Wade Graham	Cronulla-Sutherland Sharks
Gavin Cooper	North Queensland Cowboys
Frank Pritchard	Canterbury-Bankstown Bulldogs
Maurice Blair	Melbourne Storm
Frank Puletua	Retired
Daine Laurie	Released mid season

== Jersey and Sponsors ==
2011 Heritage Jersey

In 2011 the Panthers jerseys were again made by ISC. They retained their predominantly black home jerseys from 2010, but instead only was near fully black (Faint claw marks on either sides) with only teal on the collar and sleeves. The teal jersey of last year was to be used as the away jersey again, but was dumped in Round 4, for a white jersey with teal and black stripes and the same claw marks from the home jersey. The heritage jersey used was from their 1991 jersey. The "Pink Panthers" jersey used was based on the new away jersey, except absolutely everything on the jersey was made of different shades of pink.

Sanyo were again the major sponsor of the Panthers in 2011. Titan Warehousing Solutions were dropped as the sleeve sponsor with the club opting to go with no sponsor at all, until 17 April, when the club announced that Onsite Cleaning would be the 2011 sleeve sponsor.

== Fixtures ==
The Panthers again used Centrebet Stadium as their home ground in 2011, their home ground since they entered the competition in 1967.

=== Pre-season ===
Date	Round	Opponent	Venue	Score	Tries	Goals	Attendance	Report
19 February	Trial 1	Newcastle Knights	Port Macquarie Regional Stadium, Port Macquarie	28–22	Kingston (2), Earl, Purtell, Jesse Sene-Lefao	Gordon (2/3), Harry Seijka (2/2)	???	
26 February	Trial 2	Parramatta Eels	Centrebet Stadium, Penrith	0–30			13,228	
Legend: Win Loss Draw

=== Regular season ===
Date	Round	Opponent	Venue	Score	Tries	Goals	Attendance	Report
13 March	Round 1	Newcastle Knights	Centrebet Stadium, Penrith	8–42	Coote	Gordon (2/2)	12,431	
18 March	Round 2	Parramatta Eels	Parramatta Stadium, Parramatta	20–6	Coote, Gordon, Simmons	Gordon (4/5)	15,974	
26 March	Round 3	Cronulla-Sutherland Sharks	Centrebet Stadium, Penrith	12–44	Simmons, Coote	Gordon (2/2)	9,275	
1 April	Round 4	Brisbane Broncos	Suncorp Stadium, Brisbane	18–10	Gordon, Kevin Kingston	Gordon (1/2)	25,263	
9 April	Round 5	Canberra Raiders	Centrebet Stadium, Penrith	36–10	Simmons (3), Burns, Gordon, Civoniceva	Gordon (6/7)	10,229	
17 April	Round 6	Melbourne Storm	Centrebet Stadium, Penrith	10–25	Earl, Tahu	Gordon (1/2)	11,137	
22 April	Round 7	Manly-Warringah Sea Eagles	Brookvale Oval, Brookvale	22–16	Simmons, Tahu, Plum	Gordon (2/3)	14,623	
1 May	Round 8	New Zealand Warriors	Mt Smart Stadium, Auckland	26–18	Grant, Waterhouse, Seluini	Gordon (3/3)	11,412	
	Round 9	Bye						
13 May	Round 10	Brisbane Broncos	Centrebet Stadium, Penrith	33–10	Tighe (2), Kingston, Lewis, Tahu, Gordon	Gordon (4/5), Walsh (0/1), FG (1)	11,336	
21 May	Round 11	Wests Tigers	Campbelltown Stadium, Campbelltown	20–18	Iosefa, Simmons, Coote	Walsh (3/3)	16,172	
30 May	Round 12	South Sydney Rabbitohs	Centrebet Stadium, Penrith	22–10	Lewis, Waterhouse, Purtell, Coote	Walsh (3/4)	5,703	
4 June	Round 13	Gold Coast Titans	Skilled Park, Robina	23–10	Jennings, Kingston, Purtell, Burns	Burns (3/3), Walsh (0/1), FG (1)	12,262	
	Round 14	Bye						
18 June	Round 15	Newcastle Knights	EnergyAustralia Stadium, Newcastle	16–12	Iosefa (2)	Burns (2/2)	16,652	
26 June	Round 16	North Queensland Cowboys	Centrebet Stadium, Penrith	30–20	Civoniceva, Coote, Lewis, McKendry	Burns (7/7)	14,090	
2 July	Round 17	Canterbury-Bankstown Bulldogs	Centrebet Stadium, Penrith	20–6	Burns (2), Purtell	Burns (4/4)	15,383	
10 July	Round 18	Sydney Roosters	Sydney Football Stadium, Sydney	34–26	Coote (2), Lewis, Kingston	Burns (5/5)	9,713	
16 July	Round 19	Parramatta Eels	Centrebet Stadium, Penrith	23–22	Coote (2), Simmons (2)	Burns (3/4), Walsh FG (1)	17,323	
24 July	Round 20	Manly-Warringah Sea Eagles	Centrebet Stadium, Penrith	8–12	Simmons, Coote	Burns (0/1) (Note: Travis Burns would forgo the shot at goal after the second try in a bid to save time with the possible chance of scoring another try with 31 seconds left)	13,832	
30 July	Round 21	North Queensland Cowboys	Dairy Farmers Stadium, Townsville	18–30	Walsh, Purtell, Tighe	Walsh (2/2), Seijka (1/1)	12,349	
6 August	Round 22	Melbourne Storm	AAMI Park, Melbourne	26–6	Purtell	Walsh (1/1)	12,162	
12 August	Round 23	Wests Tigers	Centrebet Stadium, Penrith	18–32	Purtell, Walker, Waterhouse	Walsh (3/3)	15,192	
20 August	Round 24	New Zealand Warriors	Centrebet Stadium, Penrith	12–26	Simmons, Tighe	Walsh (2/3)	11,644	
27 August	Round 25	Canberra Raiders	Canberra Stadium, Canberra	18–19	Simmons, Tighe, Walsh	Walsh (3/3), FG (1)	10,085	
2 September	Round 26	St George Illawarra Dragons	WIN Stadium, Wollongong	32–12	Austin, Coote	Walsh (2/2)	13,621	
Legend: Win Loss Draw Bye

== Milestones and achievements ==
- Round 2 – (18 March): the Panthers notched up their first win of the season
- Round 5 – (7 April): against the Canberra Raiders, Winger David Simmons would bag the first hat trick of the season for the Panthers. In the same round, Sarafu Fatiaki made his debut for the club.
- Round 6 – (17 April): Timana Tahu would score his first try for the club since signing with the Panthers in Round 6
- Round 7 – (22 April): the board decided that they club would part ways with coach Matthew Elliott at the end of the season after a poor start to the season which sees them in 14th
- Round 8 – (1 May): Nafe Seluini scored his first try for the Panthers against his former team, the New Zealand Warriors. In the same match, new recruit Yileen Gordon would make his debut for the club as well as Trent Waterhouse scoring 150 career points. The match also saw Michael Gordon and Travis Burns notch up 100 career matches, all of Michael Gordon's coming with the Panthers
- Round 10 – (12–17 May) Phil Gould signed on as Coaching Manager for next season. Dayne Weston made his debut for the club off the bench. The match was also the first Drop Goal scored by the club this season. It was confirmed on the 14th, the day after the match, that fullback Michael Gordon had ruptured his Anterior Cruciate Ligament and will miss the rest of the season. It was announced by FoxSports that new recruit Timana Tahu had ruptured his Pectoral Muscle and would be out for the rest of the season
- Round 11 – (19–22 May) It was announced by both the NRL and Newcastle Knights that injured player Timana Tahu will link up next season with the Knights for 2 seasons. Lachlan Coote made his return from Osteitis pubis, marking the return with a try. Prior to the match during warm up, Travis Burns would have to withdraw after the team doctor gave him a pain injection, accidentally hitting the nerve causing Burn's leg to go numb.
- Round 12 – (23–30 May) Round 12 couldn't have got off to a worse start with CEO Mick Leary would resign from his position effective immediately.
- Round 13 – (4 June) Michael Jennings would play his 100th game in a bitter sweet win against Gold Coast Titans. Although it was a milestone in games, he would hobble off in the 60th minute after getting his leg stuck under a Titans player. He was ruled out for 4 weeks and missed Origin II and Origin III
- Round 15 – (20 June) Matthew Elliott stepped down as Coach for the rest of the season, Steve Georgallis was named caretaker coach for the rest of the season. Daine Laurie was also released midweek due to behaviour. New signing Arana Taumata was also investigated by police after using a script pad he stole from the club doctor. Star centre Michael Jennings was also fined $10,000 for drinking whilst being injured
- Round 15 – (20 June) Steve Georgallis would coach his first match as head coach in NRL by beating the North Queensland Cowboys 30–20 on a day that would see a new maximum crowd for the season of 14,090. The game would also mark the 100th game for Adrian Purtell.
- Round 16 – (2 July) Steve Georgallis would notch up his second win in as many games as the Panthers beat the Bulldogs 20–6. It was announced earlier in the week that Trent Waterhouse would leave the club for a 3-year deal at Warrington Wolves in the Super League. It was also announced during the week that Ivan Cleary would take the head coach role with the club from next season.
- Round 21 – (26 July) Petero Civoniceva would announce his return to the Brisbane Broncos in 2012, citing it was for his family. The Panthers would grant him a release with 1 year left on his contract.

== Ladder ==
2011 NRL Telstra Premiership
Pos.	Team	Pld	W	D	L	B	PF	PA	PD	Pts
1	Melbourne Storm	24	19	0	5	2	521	308	213	42
2	Manly Warringah Sea Eagles (P)	24	18	0	6	2	539	331	208	40
3	Brisbane Broncos	24	18	0	6	2	511	372	139	40
4	Wests Tigers	24	15	0	9	2	519	430	89	34
5	St. George Illawarra Dragons	24	14	1	9	2	483	341	142	33
6	New Zealand Warriors	24	14	0	10	2	504	393	111	32
7	North Queensland Cowboys	24	14	0	10	2	532	480	52	32
8	Newcastle Knights	24	12	0	12	2	478	443	35	28
9	Canterbury-Bankstown Bulldogs	24	12	0	12	2	449	489	-40	28
10	South Sydney Rabbitohs	24	11	0	13	2	531	562	-31	26
11	Sydney Roosters	24	10	0	14	2	417	500	-83	24
12	Penrith Panthers	24	9	0	15	2	430	517	-87	22
13	Cronulla-Sutherland Sharks	24	7	0	17	2	428	557	-129	18
14	Parramatta Eels	24	6	1	17	2	385	538	-153	17
15	Canberra Raiders	24	6	0	18	2	423	623	-200	16
16	Gold Coast Titans	24	6	0	18	2	363	629	-266	16
