= Penrith Panthers honours =

Rugby league team awards

The following is a list of titles and awards won by National Rugby League club, the Penrith Panthers.

== Team honours ==
=== Premierships ===
| Year | Opponent | Competition | Score |
|---|---|---|---|
| 1991 | Canberra Raiders | NSWRL | 19-12 |
| 2003 | Sydney Roosters | NRL | 18-6 |
| 2021 | South Sydney Rabbitohs | NRL | 14-12 |
| 2022 | Parramatta Eels | NRL | 28-12 |
| 2023 | Brisbane Broncos | NRL | 26-24 |
| 2024 | Melbourne Storm | NRL | 14-6 |

=== Runners-up ===
| Year | Opponent | Competition | Score |
|---|---|---|---|
| 1990 | Canberra Raiders | NSWRL | 14-18 |
| 2020 | Melbourne Storm | NRL | 20-26 |

=== Minor Premierships ===
| Year | Competition | Wins |
|---|---|---|
| 1991 | NSWRL | 17 |
| 2003 | NRL | 18 |
| 2020 | NRL | 18 |
| 2022 | NRL | 20 |
| 2023 | NRL | 18 |

=== Wooden Spoon ===
| Year | Competition | Wins |
|---|---|---|
| 1973 | NSWRL | 5 |
| 1980 | NSWRL | 2 (1 draw) |
| 2001 | NRL | 7 |
| 2007 | NRL | 8 |

=== World Club Challenges ===
| Year | Opponent | Result | Score |
|---|---|---|---|
| 1991 | Wigan Warriors | Loss | 4-21 |
| 2004 | Bradford Bulls | Loss | 4-22 |
| 2022 | St Helens | Not held | |
| 2023 | St Helens | Loss | 12-13 |
| 2024 | Wigan Warriors | Loss | 12-16 |

=== Finals appearances ===
1985, 1988, 1989, 1990, 1991, 1997, 2000, 2003, 2004, 2010, 2014, 2016, 2017, 2018, 2020, 2021, 2022, 2023, 2024, 2025.

== Individual awards ==
=== Club awards ===
The Player of the Year award is named the Merv Cartwright Medal. The Rookie of the Year award is named after Ben Alexander.

| Year | Merv Cartwright Medal | John Farragher Award | Ben Alexander Rookie of the Year | Club Person of the Year | Members' Player of the Year | Reserve Grade Player of the Year | NYC / Jersey Flegg Player of the Year | NSW Women's Player of the Year | Senior Education Award | Junior Education Award |
|---|---|---|---|---|---|---|---|---|---|---|
| 2005 | Craig Gower | Preston Campbell | Unknown | | | | | | | |
| 2006 | Rhys Wesser | Luke Priddis | Paul Aiton | Preston Campbell | Unknown | David McLean | Jaye Marleitner | Unknown | | |
| 2007 | Michael Jennings | Nathan Smith | Michael Jennings | Frank Puletua | Unknown | Brendan Worth & Craig Trindall | Masada Iosefa & Brendan Hlad | Unknown | | |
| 2008 | Petero Civoniceva | Luke Lewis | Lachlan Coote | Petero Civoniceva | Unknown | Andrew Pearn | Jamie Theoharous | Unknown | | |
| 2009 | Trent Waterhouse | Luke Walsh | Junior Tia-Kilifi | Petero Civoniceva | Trent Waterhouse | Ben McFadgean | Joel Romelo | Unknown | | |
| 2010 | Luke Lewis | Lachlan Coote | Sandor Earl | Unknown | | | | | | |
| 2011 | Luke Walsh | Travis Burns | Nafe Seluini | John Lawford | Michael Gordon | Jesse Sene-Lefao | Kurt Horton | Unknown | | |
| 2012 | Kevin Kingston | Kevin Kingston | Josh Mansour | Jim Jones | Lachlan Coote | Arana Taumata | Vaipuna Tia-Kilifi | Unknown | | |
| 2013 | David Simmons | Nigel Plum | Matt Moylan | Kevin Kingston | David Simmons | Sam Anderson | Daniel Foster | Unknown | | |
| 2014 | Matt Moylan | Adam Docker | Bryce Cartwright & Dallin Watene-Zelezniak | Jamie Soward | Jamie Soward | Ryan Simpkins | Brendan Attwood | Unknown | | |
| 2015 | Tyrone Peachey | Bryce Cartwright | Reagan Campbell-Gillard | Krystal Sharp | Reagan Campbell-Gillard | Will Smith | Moses Leota | Unknown | | |
| 2016 | Trent Merrin | Peter Wallace | Nathan Cleary & James Fisher-Harris | Glen Liddiard | Peter Wallace | Zach Dockar-Clay | Corey Waddell | Unknown | | |
| 2017 | Reagan Campbell-Gillard | Isaah Yeo | Dylan Edwards & Corey Harawira-Naera | Trent Merrin | Nathan Cleary | Mitch Rein | Wayde Egan | Unknown | | |
| 2018 | Isaah Yeo | Josh Mansour | Jack Hetherington | Peter Wallace | Viliame Kikau | Caleb Aekins | Daine Laurie | Unknown | | |
| 2019 | James Fisher-Harris | James Fisher-Harris | Brian To'o | Kevin Kingston | James Fisher-Harris | Billy Burns | Charlie Staines | Unknown | | |
| 2020 | Nathan Cleary | James Fisher-Harris | Stephen Crichton | Jason Wrigley | Nathan Cleary | Not awarded | | Unknown | | |
| 2021 | Nathan Cleary | Dylan Edwards | Izack Tago | Darren Micallef | Brian To'o | Not awarded | | Unknown | | |
| 2022 | Dylan Edwards | James Fisher-Harris | Taylan May | Alan Mair | Dylan Edwards | J'maine Hopgood | Not awarded | Unknown | | |
| 2023 | Isaah Yeo | Moses Leota | Sunia Turuva | Henry Ward | Dylan Edwards | Liam Henry | Sam Lane | Unknown | | |
| 2024 | Isaah Yeo | Mitch Kenny | Liam Henry | Matt Eisenhuth | Isaah Yeo | Isaiah Iongi | Nick Murphy | Unknown | | |
| 2025 | Nathan Cleary | Thomas Jenkins | Luron Patea | Scott Sorensen | Thomas Jenkins | Luke Sommerton | Jenson Tuaoi | Unknown | | |
| 2026 | Dylan Edwards | Liam Henry | Billy Phillips | Brian To'o | Thomas Jenkins | Jaxen Edgar | Haami Loza | Chloe Pallisier | Liam Henry | Julie Tauafao |
