= Luron =

Luron can be both a masculine given name and a surname. Notable people with the name include:

- Luron Patea, Samoan-Australian rugby league football prop
- Kevin Luron (born 1991), French triple jumper
- Thierry Le Luron (1952–1986), French impressionist and comedian
