= Matt Sing =

Australia international rugby league footballer

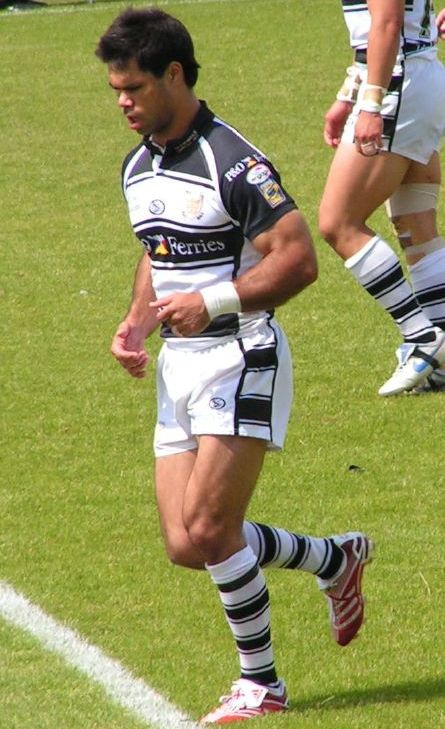
- Sing playing for Hull FC in 2007

Personal information
- Full name: Matthew Charles Sing
- Born: 13 March 1975 (age 51) Winton, Queensland, Australia

Playing information
- Height: 175 cm (5 ft 9 in)
- Weight: 86 kg (13 st 8 lb)
- Position: Wing, Centre
Club
Years	Team	Pld	T	G	FG	P
1993–95	Penrith Panthers	36	14	0	0	56
1996–01	Sydney Roosters	135	72	0	0	288
2002–06	North Qld Cowboys	104	73	0	0	292
2007–08	Hull FC	48	17	0	0	68
	Total	323	176	0	0	704
Representative
Years	Team	Pld	T	G	FG	P
1995–05	Queensland	24	5	0	0	20
1995–05	Australia	14	5	0	0	20

Matthew Charles Sing (born 13 March 1975) is an Australian former professional rugby league footballer who played in the 1990s and 2000s. An Australian and Queensland representative, Sing played his club football for the Penrith Panthers, Sydney Roosters and North Queensland Cowboys in the National Rugby League (NRL) and for Hull FC in the Super League.

Sing was the sixth player in Australian first grade history to score 150 tries and, as of 2025, is equal tenth on the all-time try scorers list.

== Background ==
Born in Winton, Queensland, Sing is of Indigenous Australian descent. He grew up in Dysart, playing his junior rugby league for the Dysart Bulls and later attending North Rockhampton State High School In 1992, Sing was selected for the Queensland under-17 side, coming off the bench in their 14–22 loss to New South Wales.

== Playing career ==
=== Penrith Panthers ===
Sing joined the Penrith Panthers in 1993, originally as a halfback. After poor form for the Panthers' lower grade sides, he was dropped to the local Penrith competition, where former Panthers' coach Len Stacker moved him to centre. The move kick-started his career, as he returned to the Panthers' reserve grade side after just one game, was selected for the Junior Kangaroos and made his first grade debut in Round 13 of the 1993 NSWRL season. He finished his debut season playing four games off the bench. In 1994, he locked down a starting centre spot for Penrith, playing 17 games, scoring six tries and being named the club's Rookie of the Year.

In 1995, Sing made his State of Origin debut for Queensland, starting on the wing in all three games in their 3–0 series victory over New South Wales. In July 1995, he made his Test debut for Australia, starting on the wing in their 20–10 win over New Zealand. Sing left the Panthers at the end of the 1995 season as the club sided with the rebel Super League competition. Sing stayed loyal to the Australian Rugby League, signing with the ARL-aligned Sydney City Roosters. In Sing's final season for the Panthers, he scored 8 tries in 15 games.

=== Sydney Roosters ===
In 1996, in his first season for the Roosters, Sing scored 12 tries in 21 games. In his first five seasons with the club, Sing scored 10 or more tries each year. He played in all three games for Queensland in their 1996 State of Origin series loss to New South Wales and in October, represented Australia in their 52–6 win over Papua New Guinea. In 1997, he scored 11 tries in 22 games as the Roosters came within one game of the Grand Final. In June 1997, he scored his first try for Queensland in their 14–15 loss to New South Wales. In July 1997, he scored for Australia in their 28–8 win over the Rest of the World. In 1998, Sing scored 15 tries in 27 games for the Roosters and once again played all three games for Queensland in their series win over New South Wales. In Round 21 of the 1998 season, he played his 100th first grade game in the Roosters' 20–32 loss to the Melbourne Storm.

In 1999, he earned a recall to the Australian side, coming off the bench in their Anzac Test win over New Zealand. In 2000, he was awarded the Australian Sports Medal for his contribution to Australia's international standing in the sport of rugby league. On 27 August 2000, he started on the wing for the Roosters in their Grand Final loss to the Brisbane Broncos. In Round 5 of the 2001 NRL season, he played his 150th first grade in the Roosters' 30–31 loss to the Northern Eagles.

=== North Queensland Cowboys ===
In 2002, Sing joined the struggling North Queensland Cowboys. In his first season with the club, he scored 16 tries in 23 games and won their Player of the Year and Players' Player awards. In Round 22 of the 2002 season, he scored his 100th first grade try in the Cowboys' 30–40 loss to the Melbourne Storm. In 2003 NRL season, he scored 21 tries in 20 games and again won the club's Players' Player award. That season he earned recalls to the Queensland and Australian sides. In the third game of the 2003 State of Origin series, he scored a hat-trick in a 36–6 win over New South Wales and was named man of the match. In November 2003, he started two games on the wing in Australia's Ashes series win over Great Britain. In 2004, Sing played just 12 games due to jaw and knee injuries. He returned in time for the finals, scoring a hat trick in a 30–22 win over the Canterbury Bulldogs, the club's first ever finals game. In October and November 2004, he represented Australia in their victorious Tri-Nations campaign, starting on the wing in all five games. Following the Tri-Nations, he announced his retirement from representative football.

In 2005, Sing reversed his retirement decision, starting all three games for Queensland in the 2005 State of Origin series and playing for Australia in the 2005 Anzac Test. In the 2005 NRL season, he played 25 games, scoring 16 tries. He played his 250th first grade game in the Cowboys' 29–0 preliminary final win over the Parramatta Eels. On 2 October 2005, he started on the wing in the Cowboys' Grand Final loss to the Wests Tigers. In 2006, Sing played his final season for the Cowboys, playing 24 games and finishing as the side's top try scorer with 13 tries. In Round 2 of the 2006 NRL season, he scored his 150th first grade try, the sixth player to do so. On 6 June 2006, he signed a two-year deal with Hull F.C.

=== Hull F.C. ===
In 2007, Sing scored 11 tries in 23 Super League games for Hull F.C. On 30 August 2008, he started on the wing in Hull's 2008 Challenge Cup Final loss to St Helens. He retired from professional rugby league at the end of the 2008 season. He played 48 games for Hull over two seasons, scoring 17 tries.

== Achievements and accolades ==
=== Individual ===
Penrith Panthers Rookie of the Year: 1994
North Queensland Cowboys Player of the Year: 2002
North Queensland Cowboys Players' Player: 2002, 2003

== Statistics ==
=== NRL ===
Statistics are correct to the end of the 2008 season

Season	Team	Matches	T	G	GK %	F/G	Pts
1993	Penrith	4	0	0	—	0	0
1994	Penrith	17	6	0	—	0	24
1995	Penrith	15	8	0	—	0	32
1996	Sydney City	21	12	0	—	0	48
1997	Sydney City	22	11	0	—	0	44
1998	Sydney City	27	15	0	—	0	60
1999	Sydney City	20	13	0	—	0	52
2000	Sydney	19	13	0	—	0	52
2001	Sydney	26	8	0	—	0	32
2002	North Queensland	23	16	0	—	0	64
2003	North Queensland	20	21	0	—	0	84
2004	North Queensland	12	7	0	—	0	28
2005	North Queensland	25	16	0	—	0	64
2006	North Queensland	24	13	0	—	0	159
Career totals		275	159	0	–	0	636

=== Super League/Challenge Cup ===
Season	Team	Matches	T	G	GK %	F/G	Pts
2007 Super League	Hull F.C.	23	11	0	—	0	44
2007 Challenge Cup	Hull F.C.	3	1	0	—	0	4
2008 Super League	Hull F.C.	18	3	0	—	0	12
2008 Challenge Cup	Hull F.C.	4	2	0	—	0	8
Career totals		48	17	0	–	0	68

=== International ===
Season	Team	Matches	T	G	GK %	F/G	Pts
1995	Australia	1	0	0	—	0	0
1996	Australia	1	0	0	—	0	0
1997	Australia	1	1	0	—	0	4
1999	Australia	1	0	0	—	0	0
2003	Australia	4	2	0	—	0	8
2004	Australia	5	1	0	—	0	4
2005	Australia	1	1	0	—	0	4
Career totals		14	5	0	—	0	20

=== State of Origin ===
†	Denotes seasons in which Sing won a State of Origin Series

Season	Team	Matches	T	G	GK %	F/G	Pts
1995†	Queensland	3	0	0	—	0	0
1996	Queensland	3	0	0	—	0	0
1997	Queensland	3	1	0	—	0	4
1998†	Queensland	3	1	0	—	0	4
1999	Queensland	2	0	0	—	0	0
2000	Queensland	2	0	0	—	0	0
2003	Queensland	3	3	0	—	0	12
2004	Queensland	2	0	0	—	0	0
2005	Queensland	3	0	0	—	0	0
Career totals		24	5	0	—	0	20

== Post-playing career ==
In 2009, Sing joined the Central Comets Queensland Cup side as an assistant and backs coach. In June 2009, he briefly came out of retirement to play for the Comets.

On 17 May 2015, Sing was named on the wing in the Cowboys 20-year team and, alongside Paul Bowman, was an inaugural inductee into the Cowboys' Hall of Fame.
