= Ryan O'Hara =

Australian former professional rugby league footballer

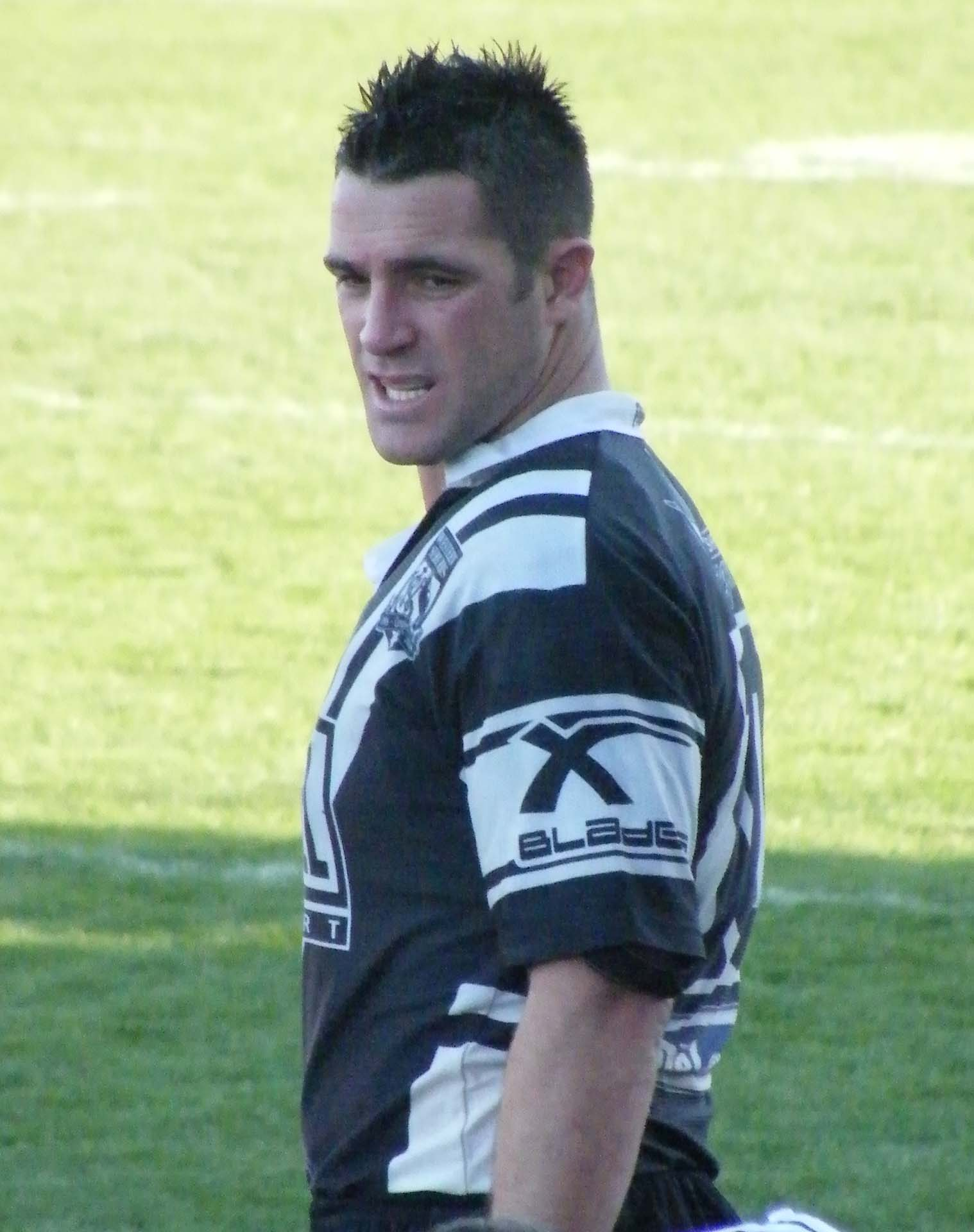

Personal information
- Full name: Ryan Anthony O'Hara
- Born: 18 August 1980 (age 46) Sydney, New South Wales, Australia

Playing information
- Height: 188 cm (6 ft 2 in)
- Weight: 101 kg (15 st 13 lb)
- Position: Prop
Club
| Years | Team | Pld | T | G | FG | P |
|---|---|---|---|---|---|---|
| 2001–05 | Canberra Raiders | 95 | 7 | 0 | 0 | 28 |
| 2006–08 | Wests Tigers | 30 | 1 | 0 | 0 | 4 |
| 2009–11 | Celtic Crusaders | 78 | 7 | 0 | 0 | 28 |
| 2012–14 | Hull Kingston Rovers | 15 | 1 | 0 | 0 | 4 |
| 2014 | FC Lézignan XIII |
| 2014 | The Entrance Tigers |
| | Total | 218 | 16 | 0 | 0 | 64 |
Representative
| Years | Team | Pld | T | G | FG | P |
| 2003–04 | NSW Country | 2 | 0 | 0 | 0 | 0 |
| 2004 | New South Wales | 1 | 0 | 0 | 0 | 0 |

Ryan O'Hara (born 18 August 1980) is an Australian former professional rugby league footballer who played for the Jacksonville Axemen in the USA Rugby League. A New South Wales State of Origin representative forward, he previously played in the NRL for the Canberra Raiders and the Wests Tigers. He played as a prop.

== Background ==
O'Hara was born in Sydney, New South Wales, Australia.

== Playing career ==
A Hunter Mariners junior, O'Hara made his NRL début as a 20-year-old and won the Canberra Raiders' Rookie of the Year award in 2001. He made his representative début for Country in the City v Country Origin match of 2003. The following year he was selected to represent New South Wales in Game I of the 2004 State of Origin series. In his first four seasons with the Raiders, he played in 92 games, but only made 3 appearances in 2005.

Having joined the premiership-winning Wests Tigers at the close of the 2005 NRL season, O'Hara first played for them in the 2006 World Club Challenge loss to Bradford Bulls in England. He was bought by coach Tim Sheens to add some size to the small Wests Tigers pack and was a regular in first grade in 2006, playing in 22 games. For the next two seasons he managed just eight appearances, and was later described as one of the worst buys in NRL history. He played four games straight in 2007, all victories, before having his jaw broken. He returned to lower grades towards the end of the season, before having his jaw broken again at the start of 2008, and didn't return to first grade until round 22.

At the end of the 2008 NRL season O'Hara moved to Wales to play in the Super League for the Crusaders. He spent three seasons at the club before joining Hull KR. O'Hara played 15 games for Hull in 2012, but suffered an Achilles tendon injury in the 2013 pre-season. Months later he was still described as being out indefinitely, and made no further appearances for the club. Announcing his departure to Lézignan Sangliers, O'Hara said, "I've had a good time in England and Wales for the last five seasons. My two years here at Hull KR have been quite upsetting for me though because of the injuries I've had. That’s nobody’s fault, just bad luck really."

Later in 2014, O'Hara joined The Entrance Tigers in the Ron Massey Cup, co-captaining them to a grand final victory.

=== Highlights ===
- First Grade Debut: Round 3, Canberra v Cronulla at Toyota Park, 3 March 2001.
- State of Origin: Selected for New South Wales, in game I of the 2004 State of Origin series.
