= 1996 State of Origin series =

Australian rugby league series

- Won by: New South Wales (7th title)
- Series margin: 3 - 0
- Points scored: 73
- Attendance: 119,520 (ave. 39,840 per match)
- Player of the series: Geoff Toovey
- Top points scorer(s): Andrew Johns (16)
- Top try scorer(s): Brett Mullins (3)

The 1996 State of Origin series saw the 15th time that the annual three-game series between the Queensland and New South Wales representative rugby league football teams was contested entirely under 'state of origin' selection rules. This series saw the return to representative football of players who had signed with Super League, after a court decision had delayed the beginning of Super League until at least 2000. As a result, both teams were back to full strength, and a new record was set for the highest State of Origin crowd at the Sydney Football Stadium.

New South Wales were able to bounce back from the 3 - 0 whitewash of the 1995 Series and win the 1996 series 3 - 0, reversing the result of the previous year. The first send off in Origin history occurred in 1996 and New South Wales made further history as the first side to go through a complete series without a player change.

== Game I ==
Monday, 20 May, 1996

Queensland	6 – 14	New South Wales
Tries: Allan Langer (47') 1 Goals: Wayne Bartrim 1/1 (49')	1st: 0 - 10; 2nd: 6 - 4 (Report)	Tries: Andrew Ettingshausen (36') 1 Steve Menzies (64') 1 Goals: Andrew Johns 3/3 (8' pen, 19' pen, 37'); Rod Wishart 0/1

Suncorp Stadium, Brisbane
Attendance: 39,348
Referee: David Manson
Player of the Match: Geoff Toovey

The Blues came out in the opener at Suncorp Stadium with all guns blazing, as the Maroons were overwhelmed all over the park and went down 14-6. If everything had gone their way though, the Blues would have finished streets ahead.

The decision by the selectors to go in with the 1995 World Cup halfback and hooker combination of Andrew Johns and Geoff Toovey was the spark that ignited the Blues. Up front New South Wales simply out muscled their opponents with Glenn Lazarus putting in an extraordinary performance. Despite the fact unlimited interchange was in force for the first time in Origin, Lazarus stayed on the paddock for the full 80 minutes.

Wendell Sailor was brilliant for the Maroons on debut, their most attacking player, but the partnership of Allan Langer and Jason Smith in the halves didn't work and the Queenslanders' ball control was poor. Tim Brasher, chosen at fullback with Brett Mullins forced to the wing, justified his selection with a brilliant performance, while Paul Harragon was inspirational up front with Lazarus.

== Game II ==
Monday, 3 June, 1996

New South Wales	18 – 6	Queensland
Tries: Brett Mullins (44', 51') 2 Rod Wishart (39') 1 Goals: Andrew Johns 3/7 (22' pen, 40', 76' pen)	1st: 8 - 6; 2nd: 10 - 0 (Report)	Tries: Steve Renouf (27') 1 Goals: Julian O'Neill 1/1 (29'); Sin Bin: Steve Walters (25') 1 Send Off: Craig Greenhill (63') 1

Sydney Football Stadium, Sydney
Attendance: 41,955
Referee: David Manson
Player of the Match: Andrew Johns

The Blues comfortably wrapped up the series with an 18-6 win in game II at the Sydney Football Stadium, with Laurie Daley and Andrew Ettingshausen demonstrating repeatedly all the skills and speed that stamped them as Origin greats.

The game was marred by the first send-off in State of Origin history when Queensland replacement forward Craig Greenhill was marched for a high tackle on Blues prop Paul Harragon. A specially convened State of Origin judiciary suspended him for four matches.

Blues coach Phil Gould said after the game that New South Wales could make some history of their own by being the first side to go through an entire Origin series unchanged. His prediction proved correct.

== Game III ==
Monday, 17 June, 1996

Queensland	14 – 15	New South Wales
Tries: Mark Coyne (72') 1 Brett Dallas (75') 1 Goals: Willie Carne 3/4 (3' pen, 73', 76')	1st: 2 - 6; 2nd: 12 - 9 (Report)	Tries: Andrew Ettingshausen (23') 1 Brett Mullins (45') 1 Goals: Rod Wishart 2/2 (46', 52' pen); Andrew Johns 1/1 (25'); Field Goals: Brad Fittler 1/1 (66'); Sin Bin: Tim Brasher (61') 1

Suncorp Stadium, Brisbane
Attendance: 38,217
Referee: David Manson
Player of the Match: Steve Menzies

The Blues skipped away to a 15-2 lead halfway through game III and with only eight minutes remaining it appeared all was lost for the Langer-led Queenslanders. Blues captain Brad Fittler had earlier potted a field goal which seemed to be almost an indulgence at the time, though in the end it proved crucial as the Maroons came storming home.

First Mark Coyne managed to somehow produce a try after the ball ricocheted off his boot, then Matt Sing made a break to put speedy winger Brett Dallas over. At 15-14 the Queenslanders suddenly had a full head of steam. With seconds remaining Langer put on a cross-field kick which was pounced on by Coyne. The Suncorp Stadium crowd went into a frenzy thinking that Coyne had pulled off another miracle Origin try but referee David Manson looked to this touch judge who ruled that Coyne had been in front of the kicker.

== New South Wales teams ==
Position	Game 1	Game 2	Game 3
Fullback	Tim Brasher		
Wing	Rod Wishart		
Centre	Andrew Ettingshausen		
Centre	Laurie Daley		
Wing	Brett Mullins		
Five-Eighth	Brad Fittler (c)		
Halfback	Geoff Toovey		
Prop	Glenn Lazarus		
Hooker	Andrew Johns		
Prop	Paul Harragon		
Second Row	David Furner		
Second Row	Dean Pay		
Lock	Adam Muir		
Interchange	Jim Dymock		
Interchange	Jason Croker		
Interchange	Jamie Ainscough		
Interchange	Steve Menzies		
Coach	Phil Gould		

== Queensland teams ==
Position	Game 1	Game 2	Game 3
Fullback	Robbie O'Davis	Wendell Sailor	
Wing	Brett Dallas		
Centre	Steve Renouf		
Centre	Matt Sing	Mark Coyne	
Wing	Wendell Sailor	Matt Sing	Willie Carne
Five-Eighth	Jason Smith	Julian O'Neill	Dale Shearer
Halfback	Allan Langer	Allan Langer (c)	
Prop	Tony Hearn		
Hooker	Wayne Bartrim	Steve Walters	
Prop	Gary Larson	Andrew Gee	
Second Row	Trevor Gillmeister (c)	Gary Larson	
Second Row	Brad Thorn		
Lock	Billy Moore		
Interchange	Adrian Lam		
Interchange	Michael Hancock	Kevin Walters	Matt Sing
Interchange	Alan Cann	Jason Smith	
Interchange	Craig Greenhill		Owen Cunningham
Coach	Paul Vautin		

== See also ==
- 1996 ARL season

== Sources ==
- Big League's 25 Years of Origin Collectors' Edition, News Magazines, Surry Hills, Sydney
