= Luke Lewis =

Australia international rugby league footballer

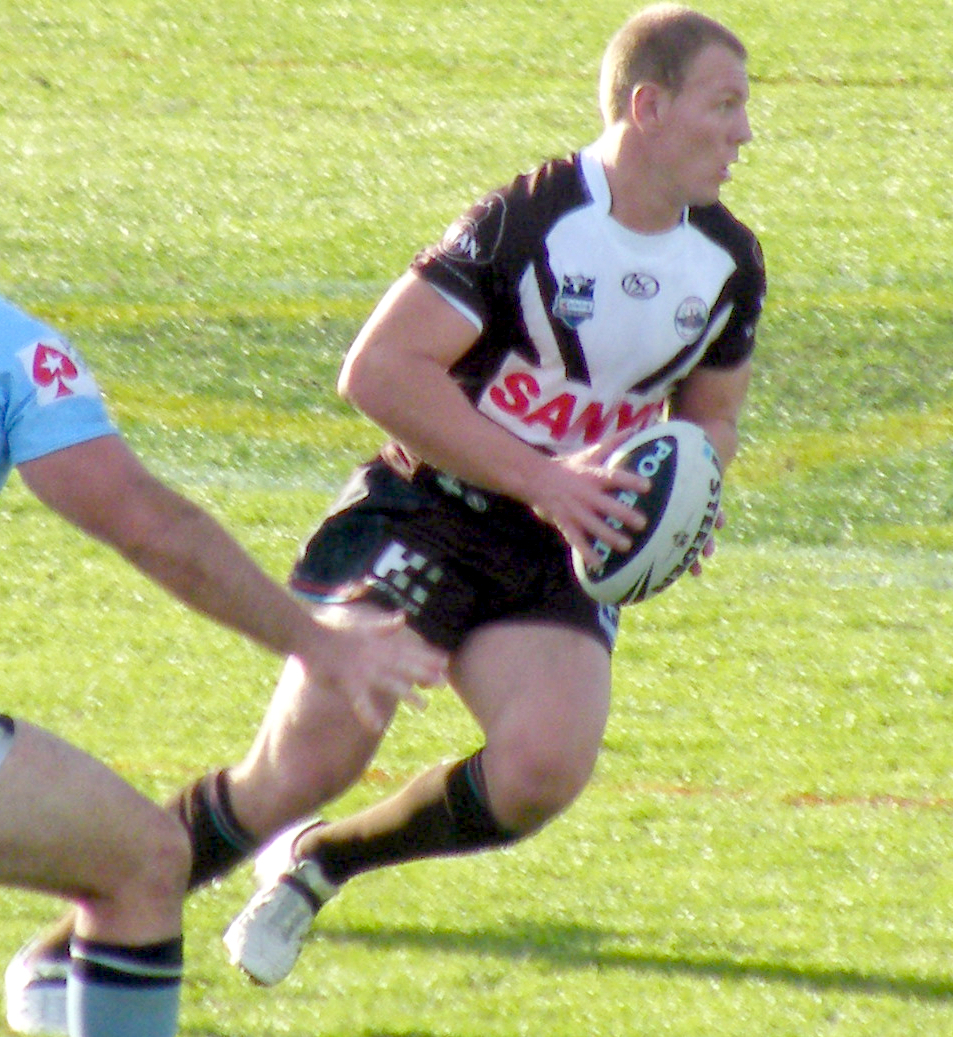

Personal information
- Born: 11 August 1983 (age 43) Sydney, New South Wales, Australia

Playing information
- Height: 188 cm (6 ft 2 in)
- Weight: 105 kg (16 st 7 lb)
- Position: Second-row, Centre, Wing, Five-eighth
Club
Years	Team	Pld	T	G	FG	P
2001–12	Penrith Panthers	208	89	0	0	356
2013–18	Cronulla Sharks	116	33	0	0	132
	Total	324	122	0	0	488
Representative
Years	Team	Pld	T	G	FG	P
2004–08	City Origin	5	2	0	0	8
2004–14	New South Wales	17	1	0	0	4
2003–15	Australia	16	6	0	0	24
2012	NRL All Stars	1	1	0	0	4

Luke Lewis (born 11 August 1983) is an Australian rugby league commentator and former professional rugby league footballer who played for the Cronulla-Sutherland Sharks and the Penrith Panthers in the National Rugby League (NRL) and Australia at international level.

He played for the Penrith Panthers between 2001 and 2012, winning the 2003 NRL Premiership with them. He played at representative level for the City Origin side, New South Wales and the NRL All Stars. A versatile player, Lewis played (but not necessarily started) in every position in first grade football. Lewis also played representative football as a winger, centre, lock and second row, and won first grade Man of the Match awards as a centre, lock, second row, five-eighth and halfback.

== Background ==
Luke Lewis was educated at Plumpton High school before moving to Patrician Brothers' College Blacktown, and spent his junior career with the Lalor Park Kooka’s Junior Rugby League Football Club in the Parramatta district and Blacktown City Junior Rugby League Football Club in the Penrith district. In early 2011, Lewis married his partner, Sonia Di Loreto. The couple welcomed their first child in April 2016, and their second in March 2018.

== Early career ==
=== 2001 ===
In Round 25 of the 2001 NRL season, Lewis made his first grade NRL debut for the Penrith Panthers against the Melbourne Storm off the interchange bench in the Penrith club's 28–24 loss at Etihad Stadium. Lewis finished his debut year in the NRL with him playing in three matches.

=== 2002 ===
In Round 3 against the Cronulla-Sutherland Sharks, Lewis scored his first NRL try in the 18–10 loss at Remondis Stadium. He finished the season with 17 tries from 23 matches, including two hat tricks.

=== 2003 ===
In the 2003 NRL grand final, Lewis played on the wing in Penrith's 18–6 win over the Sydney Roosters. Lewis played in 25 matches and scored 18 tries for the Penrith club in the 2003 NRL season. He was selected for the Kangaroos 2003 Tour squad, but did not play.

=== 2004 ===
As 2003 NRL premiers, the Penrith club travelled to England to face Super League VIII champions, the Bradford Bulls in the 2004 World Club Challenge, playing at centre in the Panthers 22–4 loss. Lewis played for NSW City Origin at centre and scored a try in the 22–18 loss to NSW Country Origin at Central Coast Stadium. Lewis was selected to play all three games of the 2004 State of Origin series on the wing and in the centres for New South Wales. Lewis finished the 2004 NRL season with him playing in 21 matches and scored 11 tries for the Penrith Panthers. Lewis was again selected for the 2004 Kangaroo tour but was not able to tour due to undergoing surgery for a shoulder reconstruction.

=== 2005 ===
Lewis played for NSW City at centre and scored a try in the 29–22 win at Lismore. He finished the 2005 NRL season with him played in 19 matches and scoring 12 tries.

=== 2006 ===
Lewis played for City at centre in the 12–10 loss in Dubbo. In Round 11 against the Parramatta Eels, Lewis played his 100th NRL match in the Penrith Panthers 30–20 win at Penrith Stadium. Lewis finished the 2006 NRL season with him playing in 16 matches and scoring four tries.

=== 2007 ===
Lewis played for City at centre in the 12–6 loss at Coffs Harbour. Lewis finished the 2007 NRL season with him playing 21 matches and scoring six tries for the Penrith club.

== Breakthrough ==
=== 2008 ===
In May, Lewis almost joined the South Sydney Rabbitohs on a four-year deal but reneged on an unofficial deal. Lewis played for City at second-row in the 22-all draw against Country at WIN Stadium. Lewis finished the season with 17 matches and five tries for the Penrith club.

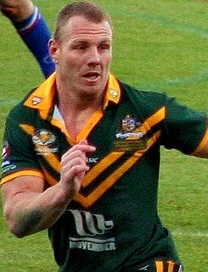
Lewis playing for Australia in 2009

=== 2009 ===
Lewis was picked as 18th man for the Australian side to play in the 2009 Anzac Test, but did not play. Lewis was named as 18th man for the squad to represent New South Wales in the opening State of Origin match on 3 June, in Melbourne. He was subsequently called into the team following the suspension of Glenn Stewart, his first appearance in Origin since 2004. Lewis played 15 matches and scored 5 tries for the Penrith club. At the end of the season, he travelled to Europe with Australia for the 2009 Four Nations tournament, and was selected to play and made his debut against England off the interchange bench in the 26–16 win at JJB Stadium. Lewis played in 3 matches and scored a try for the Kangaroos including playing at second-row in the 46–16 Final win against England.

=== 2010 ===
For the 2010 Anzac Test, Lewis played second-row in the 12–8 victory against New Zealand. In the 2010 State of Origin series, Lewis played in Games 1 and 3, with a one match suspension ruling him out of Game 2. Lewis played alongside Penrith teammates Michael Gordon, Trent Waterhouse and Michael Jennings during the series, which Queensland won for the fifth consecutive time. Lewis was named Penrith's best player in a successful season for the club, finishing second on the NRL ladder. Lewis also won the 2010 Dally M Lock of the Year award. Lewis played 21 matches and scored 5 tries for the Penrith club in the season.

Lewis was selected for the Australia's 2010 Four Nations. He scored his first try against England, and another minutes later, before unselfishly giving up a hat-trick, setting up Willie Tonga. He was awarded Man of the Match, despite succumbing to an injury in the three-quarter mark of the match. Lewis played at second-row in the Kangaroos 16–12 Final loss to New Zealand at Suncorp Stadium.

=== 2011 ===
Lewis was included in the 2011 State of Origin series, selected in Game 2 and 3 off the interchange bench. Under the new Blues coach, Ricky Stuart, Lewis was interchanged on the field in the 28th minute of the second game, and scored a try on his first touch of the ball in the 30th minute. The NSW Blues went on to win 18–8. Again, Lewis joined teammate, Jennings in Origin camp. However, despite NSW winning Game 2, Queensland won the State of Origin series for the sixth consecutive time. Lewis finished the 2011 NRL season with him playing in 14 matches and scoring 4 tries for the Penrith Panthers. Lewis was also selected to represent Australia in the 2011 Four Nations tournament which was held in the United Kingdom. In Round 2 of the Four Nations, Lewis scored for Australia, diving over the line (playing wing) in the 17th minute, where the Kangaroos beat England, 36–20 at Wembley Stadium.

=== 2012 ===
In February, Lewis played for the NRL All Stars team off the interchange bench in the 28–12 win over the Indigenous All Stars. In Round 5 against the club Lewis signed with, the Cronulla-Sutherland Sharks, Lewis played his 200th NRL match. For the 2012 Anzac Test, Lewis was selected to play for Australia at lock in the Kangaroos 20–12 win against New Zealand at Eden Park. The 2012 State of Origin series came with plenty of controversy for Lewis, with Penrith club coach Ivan Cleary stripping the captaincy off Lewis, and giving it to hooker Kevin Kingston for what Cleary promised to be temporary and only for the duration of the Origin period. Kingston was retained as captain for the remainder of year, and many suggest that this was a catalyst for Lewis' defection from Penrith to Cronulla. Lewis featured in all three Origin games, starting the opening match in the position of second-row, and was considered one of NSW's best in a losing series. Lewis had been contracted to Penrith until the end of 2014, however, on 9 July 2012, Lewis was granted a release from the remaining two years of his contract at the Penrith Panthers, prompting scenes of shock, confusion and outrage in the rugby league world, with many suggesting the stripping of the captaincy by coach, Ivan Cleary, being a major catalyst in Lewis' defection. On 20 July 2012, Lewis signed a 4-year contract with the Cronulla-Sutherland Sharks, rejecting contracts from the Wests Tigers, Newcastle Knights and Parramatta Eels – joining teammate Michael Gordon in reuniting with former Penrith teammates Ben Pomeroy and Wade Graham. Lewis was the final member of Penrith's 2003 Grand Final squad to play at Penrith, with season 2012 being his final year at the club. Lewis finished the 2012 NRL season with him playing in 13 matches and scoring two tries.

== Transfer to Cronulla-Sutherland Sharks ==
=== 2013 ===
For the 2013 NRL season, Lewis joined the Cronulla-Sutherland Sharks who were in turmoil due to an ASADA investigation into the use of banned substances at the club over previous seasons. In Round 1, he made his club debut against the Gold Coast Titans at second-row in Cronulla-Sutherland's 12–10 win at Remondis Stadium. In Round 7 against the Canterbury-Bankstown Bulldogs, Lewis scored his first club try in the 24–8 loss at Central Coast Stadium.

Lewis was selected for Australia in the 2013 Anzac Test and played from the interchange bench, scoring a try in the 32–12 victory over New Zealand at Canberra Stadium. Lewis' form was also impressive enough to earn him a spot in the New South Wales team for the 2013 State of Origin series. Lewis finished his first year with Cronulla-Sutherland scoring four tries from 20 matches. At the end of the year, he was selected for the Australian squad to travel to Europe for the World Cup tournament. In Australia's match against Fiji, Lewis suffered a dislocated shoulder after crashing into an advertising sign while scoring a try.

=== 2014 ===
After Lewis recovered from his shoulder injury, he returned to the Cronulla-Sutherland squad in Round 9 against the Parramatta Eels filling in at five-eighth for the injured Todd Carney.

Lewis was selected on the interchange bench for New South Wales in Game 1 of the 2014 State of Origin series at Suncorp Stadium on the 100th State of Origin match in the Blues 12–8 win. Lewis was selected for the interchange bench in Game 2 in the 6–4 win, resulting in the Blues breaking their 8-year losing streak to Queensland.

Lewis played off the interchange bench in the Game 3 in the 32–8 loss. In Round 21, Lewis suffered a season ending leg injury. He finished the season with one try from 8 appearances.

=== 2015 ===
Named as the captain of Cronulla's 2015 Auckland Nines squad, Lewis later withdrew due to injury. For the 2015 Anzac Test, Lewis was selected for Australia, playing off the interchange bench in the Kangaroos 26–12 loss.

In Round 13 against the Sydney Roosters, Lewis scored his 100th NRL career try in Cronulla's 10–4 win at Remondis Stadium. In Round 18 against the St George Illawarra Dragons, Lewis played his 250th NRL career match and scored a try in Cronulla-Sutherland's 28–8 win at Remondis Stadium. Lewis finished the 2015 NRL season with him playing in 22 matches and scoring 11 tries for Cronulla-Sutherland.

=== 2016 ===
On 28 January, Lewis was named as one of the co-captains alongside Chris Heighington of Cronulla's 2016 Auckland Nines squad. On 2 October he won the NRL Premiership with the Cronulla-Sutherland Sharks. Lewis won the 2016 Clive Churchill Medal as best on ground in the Grand Final.

On 24 November, Lewis signed a one-year contract with Cronulla-Sutherland to remain at the club until 2017.

=== 2017 ===
Lewis became the second Cronulla-Sutherland Sharks player, the other being Chris Heighington (in round 5) to join the 300 games club when Cronulla hosted the South Sydney Rabbitohs on Friday 21 July 2017.

=== 2018 ===
Lewis spent the majority of the 2018 NRL season with a calf injury, Lewis was expected to sign a contract extension with the Sharks because of his consistent form when playing. He decided not to renew his current contract saying "I ended up pumping it out but when I started questioning myself, I just knew that it was time to make the decision to hang them up."

Lewis played 17 games for Cronulla in his last season at the club. His final game before retirement was the 22-6 preliminary final loss against Melbourne at AAMI Park in which Lewis scored a try.

== Statistics ==
Year	Team	Games	Tries	Pts
2001	Penrith Panthers	3		
2002	Penrith Panthers	23	17	68
2003	Penrith Panthers	25	18	72
2004	Penrith Panthers	21	11	44
2005	Penrith Panthers	19	12	48
2006	Penrith Panthers	16	4	16
2007	Penrith Panthers	21	6	24
2008	Penrith Panthers	17	5	20
2009	Penrith Panthers	15	5	20
2010	Penrith Panthers	21	5	20
2011	Penrith Panthers	14	4	16
2012	Penrith Panthers	13	2	8
2013	Cronulla-Sutherland Sharks	20	4	16
2014	Cronulla-Sutherland Sharks	8	1	4
2015	Cronulla-Sutherland Sharks	22	11	44
2016	Cronulla-Sutherland Sharks	26	7	28
2017	Cronulla-Sutherland Sharks	23	6	24
2018	Cronulla-Sutherland Sharks	17	4	16
	Totals	324	122	488

== Commentary career ==
Since his retirement from NRL, Lewis has been part of the ABC Radio Grandstand NRL commentary team.
