= Arana Taumata =

NZ rugby league footballer

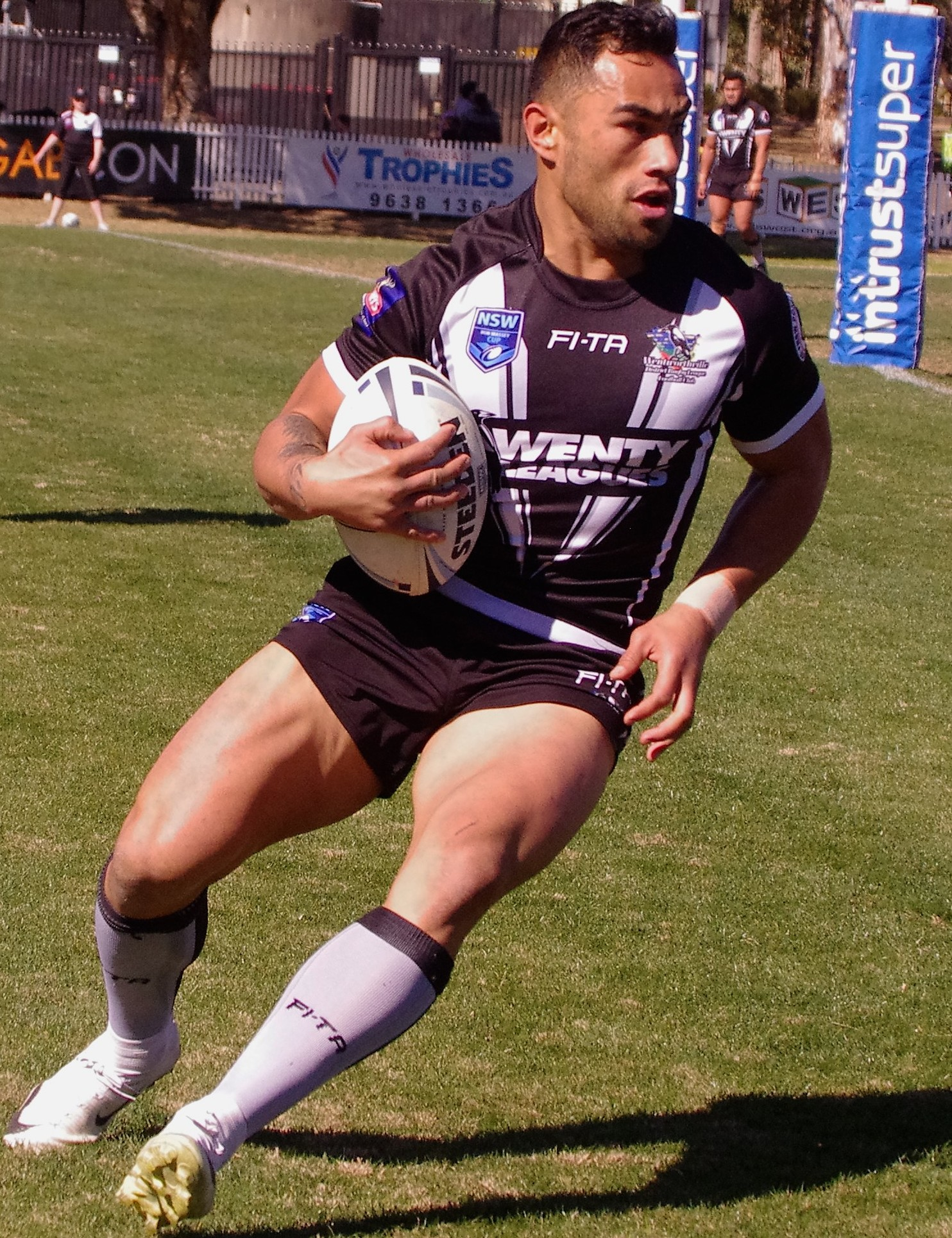

Personal information
- Born: 15 April 1989 (age 37) Wellington, New Zealand
- Height: 184 cm (6 ft 0 in)
- Weight: 87 kg (13 st 10 lb)

Playing information
- Position: Halfback, Five-eighth, Centre
Club
Years	Team	Pld	T	G	FG	P
2008	Canterbury Bulldogs	5	3	0	0	12
2010	North Qld Cowboys	7	2	0	0	8
2012	Penrith Panthers	2	1	0	0	4
	Total	14	6	0	0	24
Representative
Years	Team	Pld	T	G	FG	P
2008–10	New Zealand Māori	2	1	0	0	4
- Source: As of 25 February 2018

Arana Taumata (born 15 April 1989) is a New Zealand former professional rugby league footballer, who played primarily in the five-eighth position.

== Background ==
Taumata was born in Wellington, New Zealand to Māori parents. He has four brothers and three sisters.

== Playing career ==
Originally from Wellington, Taumata of Māori descent was brought to Australia as a 15-year-old to join the Brisbane Broncos. He was sacked by the Brisbane Broncos for disciplinary breaches and also spent time at the Sydney Roosters before making his first grade debut with Canterbury-Bankstown in round 16 of the 2008 NRL season, against his former club the Sydney Roosters.

In January 2009, Melbourne coach Craig Bellamy announced his plan to promote Taumata to a playmaking role with the Storm. In early February however, Taumata was dismissed by the Storm after a "physical altercation" off-field, his fourth dismissal in four years. It was stated that the NRL was unlikely to register a contract for Taumata for the 2009 season, even if he found another club.

Taumata signed with the Wests Tigers for the 2010 season. In June 2010, Taumata was released mid-season from his contract with the Wests Tigers after spending most of the year in the New South Wales Cup, to sign with the North Queensland Cowboys. He made his debut for the North Queensland club that weekend, coming off the bench in their 20–19 loss to the Cronulla-Sutherland Sharks. It was his first NRL game in almost two years. In October 2010 he played for the New Zealand Māori in their 18–18 draw with England prior to the 2010 Four Nations tournament.

After being released by the North Queensland club at the end of the 2010 NRL season, Taumata signed by the Penrith Panthers on a one-year deal for 2011. He played for Penrith's feeder club, the Windsor Wolves, in the NSW Cup. In June 2011 he was involved in a police investigation into prescription fraud.

After the police investigations, Taumata was found guilty of stealing a prescription pad from the Panthers club doctor, and using it to attempt to buy Valium. As a result, Taumata had to comply with an 18-month good behaviour bond. However Penrith General Manager Phil Gould offered Taumata a lifeline in the off-season and signed Taumata for another year, stating that it was his final chance to stake a claim for a first-grade jumper, with the condition that he undergo intensive counselling and labouring work.

After a stint in the Penrith Panthers feeder club, the Windsor Wolves in 2012, with the team reaching second on the NSW Cup ladder, Taumata played his first rugby league game at the top grade level in almost two years, on 17 June 2012, for the Penrith Panthers against the Gold Coast Titans. Taumata scored a try in the 59th minute of the Round 15 game - his first try at the top grade level for the Penrith club. This was also Taumata's debut appearance for the club at first grade level.

In 2013, Taumata said that he left the Penrith club and was not playing rugby league. He said had received, "no support from the club... I felt let down in many ways." Phil Gould said of Taumata's period with the Panthers, "At the time I feared he would kill himself or kill someone else the way he was living his life. That's why I stepped in to get him the help he needed. Thankfully I think those days are now well behind him. I have not heard from Arana for some time."

Taumata played for Newtown in 2014 before moving to Tumut in 2015.

Taumata was removed as Captain Coach of Tumut after round 10 of the group 9 season for disciplinary reasons. Taumata had broken the clubs '3 strike policy' and was told his services were no longer required.

Taumata was mentioned in July 2017 to be playing with Moore Park Broncos in a local Sydney A-Grade competition, in an article comparing State of Origin players to local competitors.

In 2018, Taumata joined Intrust Super Premiership NSW side the Wentworthville Magpies.

Taumata finished his NRL career as one of the least successful players in the history of the game. Taumata collected the wooden spoon with Canterbury in 2008 and ran second last with both North Queensland and Penrith in 2010 and 2012 respectively. Most recently Taumata took to representing NSW Central Coast Rugby Union side the Terrigal Trojans. Taumata failed to gain selection in the sides 2020 premiership.

== Controversy ==
In October 2024, Taumata was arrested outside the Coogee Pavillon and remanded on charges relating to outstanding domestic violence warrants, as well as resisting arrest. In January 2025, Taumata again faced court for a ponzi scheme and was sentenced to a 18-month correction order which will allow Taumata to repay his victims.
