= Yileen Gordon =

Australian rugby league footballer

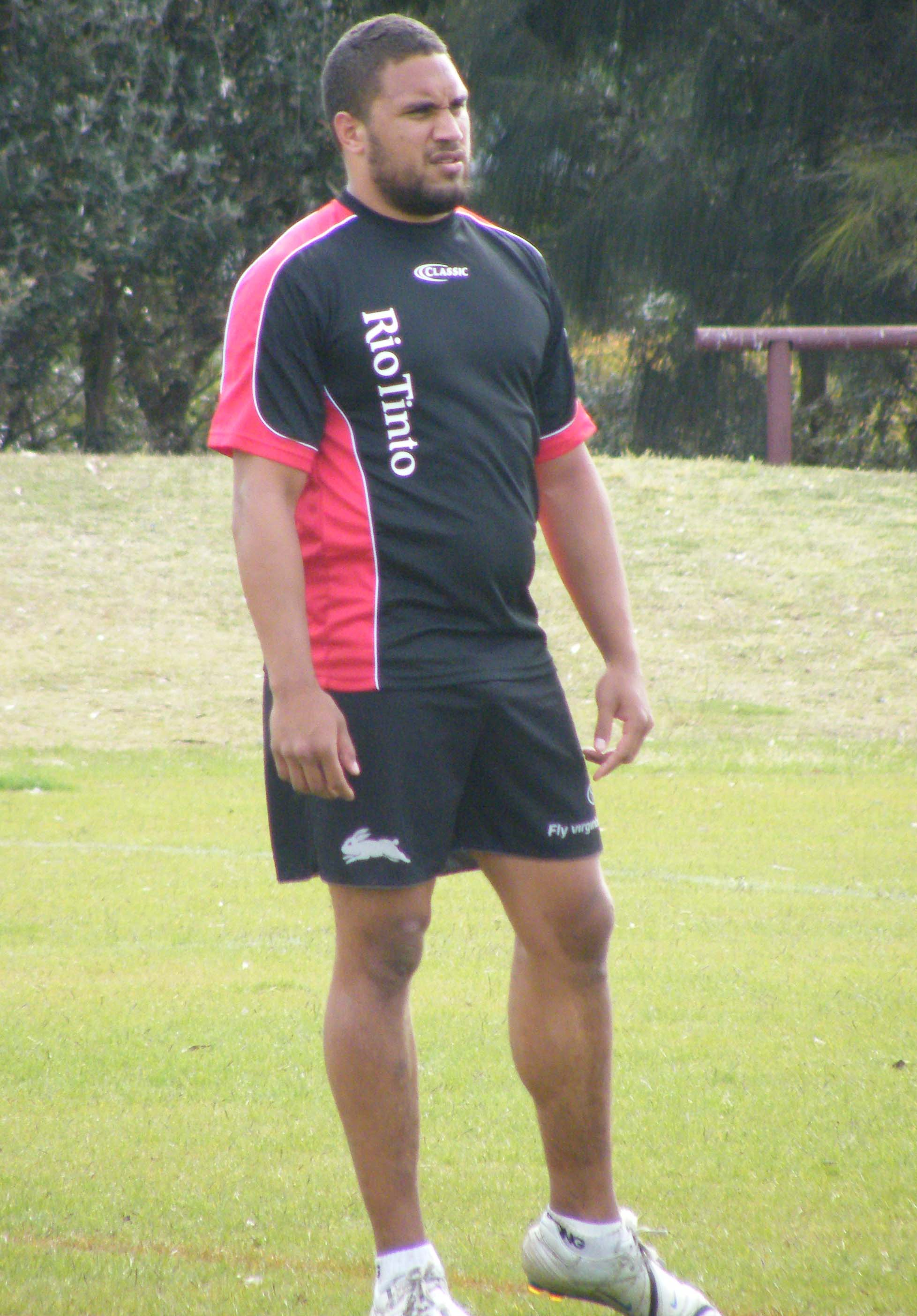

Personal information
- Born: 3 April 1987 (age 39) Sydney, New South Wales, Australia
- Height: 6 ft 2 in (1.88 m)
- Weight: 16 st 6 lb (106 kg)

Playing information
- Position: Prop, Second-row, Centre
Club
Years	Team	Pld	T	G	FG	P
2005–08	South Sydney	34	11	0	0	44
2009–10	Canterbury Bulldogs	34	0	0	0	0
2011	Penrith Panthers	3	0	0	0	0
	Total	71	11	0	0	44
Representative
Years	Team	Pld	T	G	FG	P
2008–10	Indigenous All Stars	2	1	0	0	4

Yileen "Buddy" Gordon (also known as Yilleen Gordon) (born 3 April 1987) is an Australian rugby league footballer who played for the South Sydney Rabbitohs in the NSW Cup. Gordon formerly played for the Canterbury-Bankstown Bulldogs and Penrith Panthers. He was sacked by the West Tigers in February, 2014 for breach of contract. He played in the Centres and has previously played in the back-row or at centre.

== Playing career ==
Yileen Gordon started his career at the South Sydney Rabbitohs in 2005. He made his debut for the South Sydney Rabbitohs against the Canterbury-Bankstown Bulldogs in round 13 of the 2005 NRL season, Gordon spent most of his time when not playing for Souths with the North Sydney Bears Souths feeder side in the Intrust Super Premiership NSW. Gordon played for Norths in their 2007 Intrust Super Premiership NSW grand final loss to Parramatta where he scored a try in the first half of the match.

Gordon made a total of 31 appearances for Norths and scored 17 tries. In 2008 he signed with the Canterbury-Bankstown Bulldogs, the team he played against in his debut. Gordon signed with the Penrith Panthers for the 2011 season, and his Penrith debut was a 26 - 18 loss against the New Zealand Warriors in round 8.

Gordon played the majority of the 2011 season for the Panthers' NSW Cup feeder club, the Windsor Wolves.

== Post NRL ==
After being released by Penrith, he spent 2012 playing for Moore Park in the South Sydney local league and was working at the National Centre of Indigenous Excellence, where he was part of the healthy lifestyle team and delivered anti-smoking workshops as well as educating Indigenous youth and the wider community on cost effective, healthier meal choices.

In 2013 he was signed to Newtown Jets, the feeder club for the Sydney Roosters, in the NSWRL competition.

In November, 2014 Gordon was signed to a one-year secondary tier contract with the West Tigers, but was sacked by the club before making an appearance. The club refused to reveal the reason behind the sacking, but said the termination of his contract was for "a breach of his playing terms and conditions".

He spent the 2014 season with Thirlmere before joining the Wyong Roos for 2015. Gordon scored two tries in his debut for the Wyong Roos.

Gordon's most significant achievements were representing the Indigenous team in the inaugural Indigenous All Stars Match in 2010 and scoring the winning try in the Indigenous Dreamtime vs. New Zealand Maori game in 2008.

On 16 February 2017, Gordon was announced as one of the squad players for the Mount Pritchard Mounties in the NSW Cup.

In 2018, Gordon joined Intrust Super Premiership NSW side Wentworthville.

At the end of 2018, Gordon was released by Wentworthville. On 7 March 2019, it was revealed that Gordon had signed with one of his former clubs South Sydney and played for the Souths reserve grade side during the 2019 season. On 24 September 2023, Gordon played for South Sydney in their 2023 NSW Cup grand final victory over North Sydney.

On 30 August, Gordon would play in his final match for the Rabbitohs in their 32-28 loss to the Panthers in NSW cup. The Rabbitohs would confirm Gordon's retirement at the end of the match.

Gordon works as the program mentor for Souths Cares program run by the Souths team.
