= Luron Patea =

Australian rugby league footballer

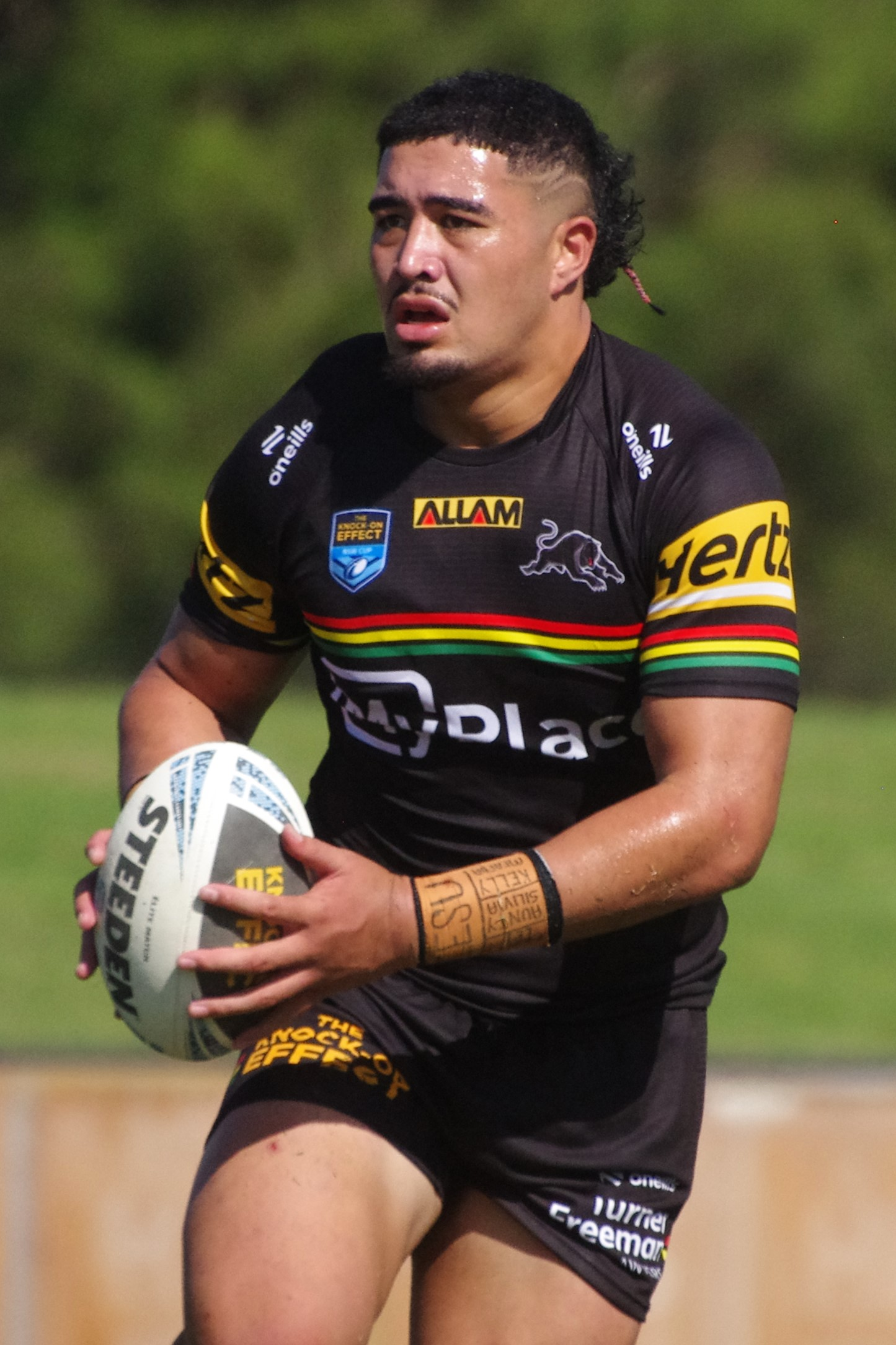

Personal information
- Full name: Luron Patea
- Born: Auckland, New Zealand

Playing information
- Position: Prop
Club
Years	Team	Pld	T	G	FG	P
2024–	Penrith Panthers	21	1	0	0	4
- Source: As of 6 September 2026

Luron Patea is a Samoan-Australian rugby league footballer who plays as a prop for the Penrith Panthers in the National Rugby League (NRL). He is contracted to the Panthers until 2027.

== Playing career ==
=== Junior ===
Patea played both rugby league and union as a junior. He played for the Penrith RSL Rugby Union club, and was selected as part of the 2022 Australian Schoolboys team that toured Japan. Patea played for Penrith in the Harold Matthews, SG Ball and Jersey Flegg competitions. In 2023, he was selected to play for the Blues in the Under-19s State of Origin match.

=== 2024 ===
Patea made his first grade debut in round 17 against the North Queensland Cowboys off the bench.

=== 2025 ===
Patea played 13 games for Penrith in the 2025 NRL season; the club finished 7th on the table. In Magic Round, he scored his first try in the NRL. He was not named in the Panthers' preliminary final team. Patea was the recipient of the Ben Alexander Rookie of the Year award in 2025.

=== 2026 ===
In September, Patea played for Penrith's NSW Cup team in their Grand Final victory over Newtown.
