= David Simmons (rugby league) =

Australian rugby league footballer

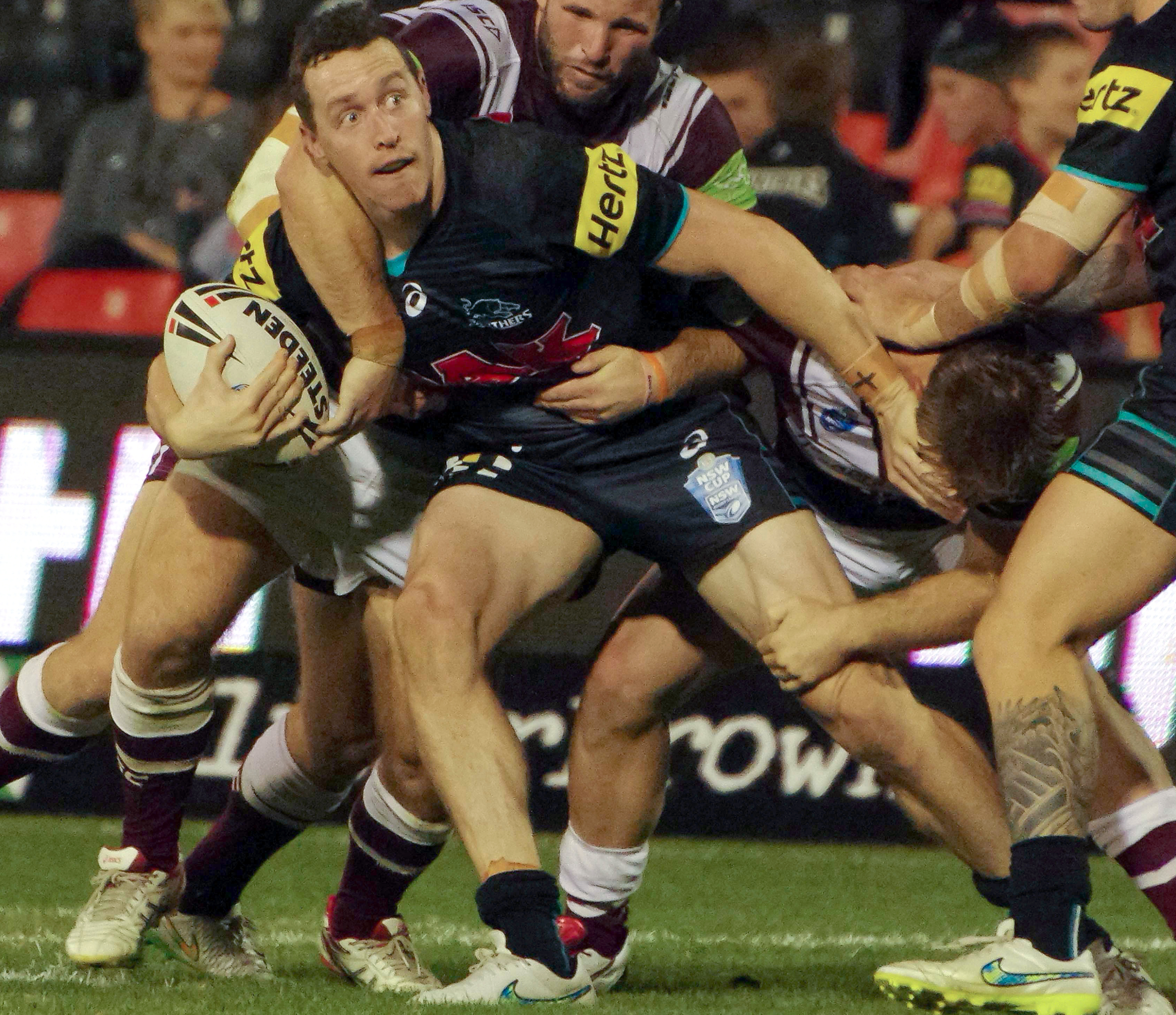

Personal information
- Born: 6 December 1984 (age 40) Sutherland, New South Wales, Australia

Playing information
- Height: 186 cm (6 ft 1 in)
- Weight: 93 kg (14 st 9 lb)
- Position: Wing, Fullback, Centre
Club
Years	Team	Pld	T	G	FG	P
2003–09	Cronulla Sharks	112	54	0	0	216
2010–15	Penrith Panthers	88	49	2	0	200
	Total	200	103	2	0	416
Representative
Years	Team	Pld	T	G	FG	P
2006	NSW City	1	1	0	0	4

David Simmons (born 6 December 1984) is an Australian former professional rugby league footballer. He played for the Cronulla-Sutherland Sharks and Penrith Panthers in the National Rugby League. He primarily played as a wing, fullback and centre.

== Playing career ==
=== Cronulla-Sutherland Sharks ===
Simmons a De La Salle junior made his debut for Cronulla in the 2003 NRL season. In 2008, Simmons was part of the Cronulla side which made the preliminary final but lost to Melbourne 28–0.

=== Penrith Panthers ===
Simmons entered the Penrith Panthers camp in 2010 with high expectations to be a new attacking weapon for the team, but once again Simmons injured his left shoulder in the trial match which resulted in him being sidelined until round 14. Simmons was finally able to represent Penrith in Round 15 of the NSW Cup, playing for the Windsor Wolves. Simmons made his Penrith first grade debut against St. George Illawarra in round 17 of the 2010 NRL season scoring a try in Penrith's victory.

In 2011, Simmons became a regular first grader for the Penrith Panthers, playing mostly left wing, though occasionally filled in the fullback position. Simmons played 23 games and was Penrith's top try scorer with Lachlan Coote, scoring 12 tries.

Simmons played 16 games for the Penrith Panthers in 2012, but only scored two tries.

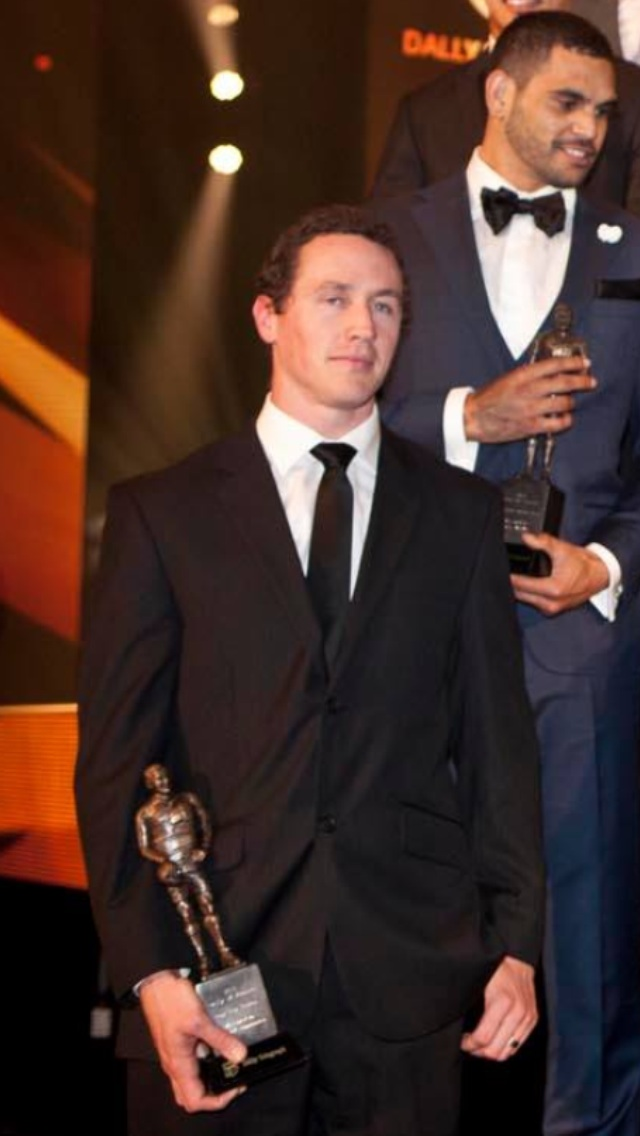
Simmons at the 2013 Dally M Awards

Simmons finished the 2013 NRL season as the leagues equal leading try scorer for the regular season, having crossed for 19 tries for the Penrith club. He shared the award with David Williams of the Manly-Warringah Sea Eagles and James McManus of the Newcastle Knights.

=== Retirement ===
On 31 August, Simmons announced his retirement from rugby league at the end of the 2015 NRL season. On 28 June 2015, Simmons scored four tries in Penrith's 35–12 victory over the Wests Tigers at Leichhardt Oval.

== Personal life ==
Simmons is a Christian, becoming one after attending a youth group. He has been ordained as an Anglican minister, after completing a Bachelor of Theology part-time at Moore Theological College, Sydney (2010-2015) and as a full-time student in 2015–2016. Simmons commenced as the Assistant Minister at Emu Plains Anglican Church in 2018, where he is currently serving the people of Western Sydney.
