= Sandor Earl =

NZ former professional rugby league footballer

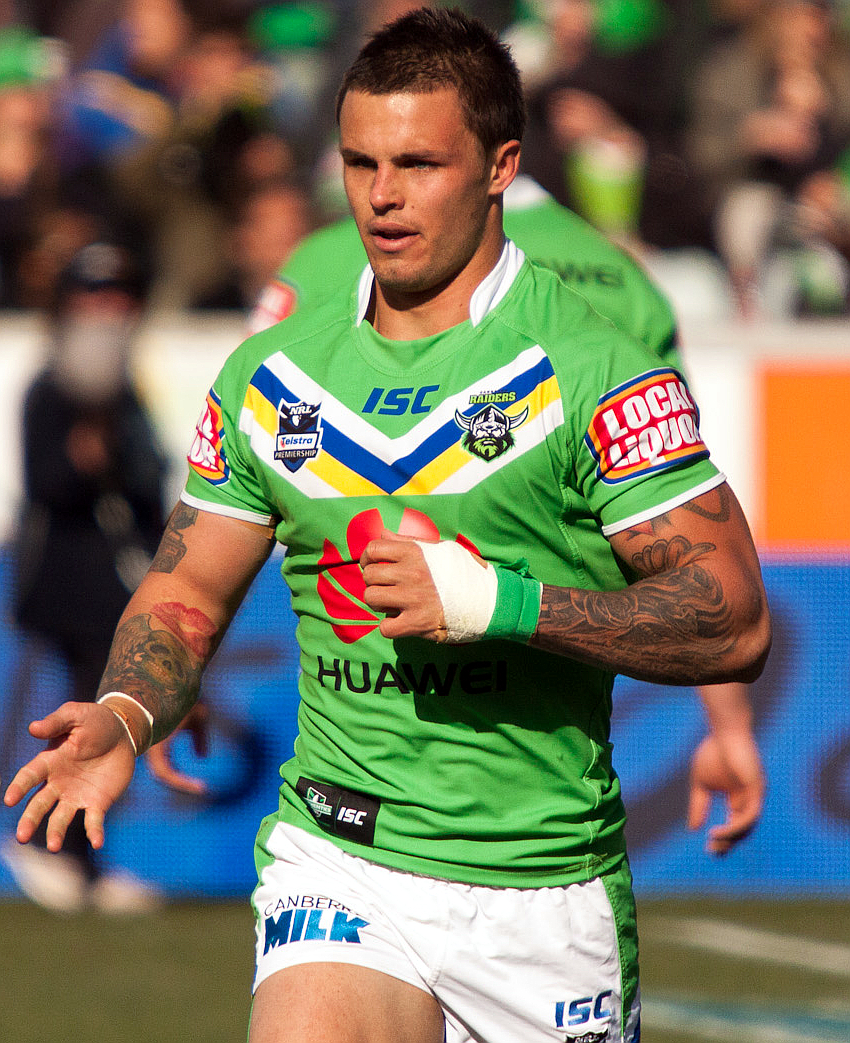

Personal information
- Born: 21 September 1989 (age 37) Wellington, New Zealand

Playing information
- Height: 190 cm (6 ft 3 in)
- Weight: 99 kg (15 st 8 lb)
- Position: Wing
Club
Years	Team	Pld	T	G	FG	P
2009	Sydney Roosters	3	0	0	0	0
2010–12	Penrith Panthers	16	6	0	0	24
2012–13	Canberra Raiders	29	17	0	0	68
2018–20	Melbourne Storm	8	3	0	0	12
	Total	56	26	0	0	104
Representative
Years	Team	Pld	T	G	FG	P
2010	New Zealand Māori	1	0	0	0	0

Sandor Earl (/ˈɜːrl/; born 21 September 1989) is a former New Zealand Māori international rugby league footballer who played on the wing for the Sydney Roosters, Penrith Panthers, Canberra Raiders and the Melbourne Storm in the National Rugby League (NRL). He was banned for four years for a doping violation in 2013.

== Early life ==
Earl was born in Wellington, New Zealand and is of Hungarian, Māori and English descent. He was raised in Sydney's eastern suburbs.

Earl played for the Paddington-Woollahra Tigers in the Sydney Roosters' junior district. Sandor as a junior also played for Fairfield Patrician Brothers and Hills District Bulls in the Parramatta Eels Junior District.

Earl was educated at the famous Rugby League nursery St Gregory's College, Campbelltown, New South Wales from year 7–11 before injuring his knee and undergoing a knee reconstruction. After recovering from the operation, Earl changed to Matraville Sports High School in 2007 where he was a member of the Arrive Alive Cup winning team, scoring a try in the final against Patrician Brothers Blacktown.

== Playing career ==
=== Sydney Roosters ===
Earl subsequently entered the NRL for the Sydney Roosters, making his debut in round 16 of the 2009 NRL season against Cronulla-Sutherland. However, the Roosters let him go at the end of the season, after he and teammate Jake Friend were charged with assault (for which he was found not guilty) on 20 July, for "sustained concussion, bruising to face, pain to neck and back", the victim being 31-year-old Queensland woman believed to be Kristy Bradley, the niece of ABC rugby league radio commentator David Morrow.

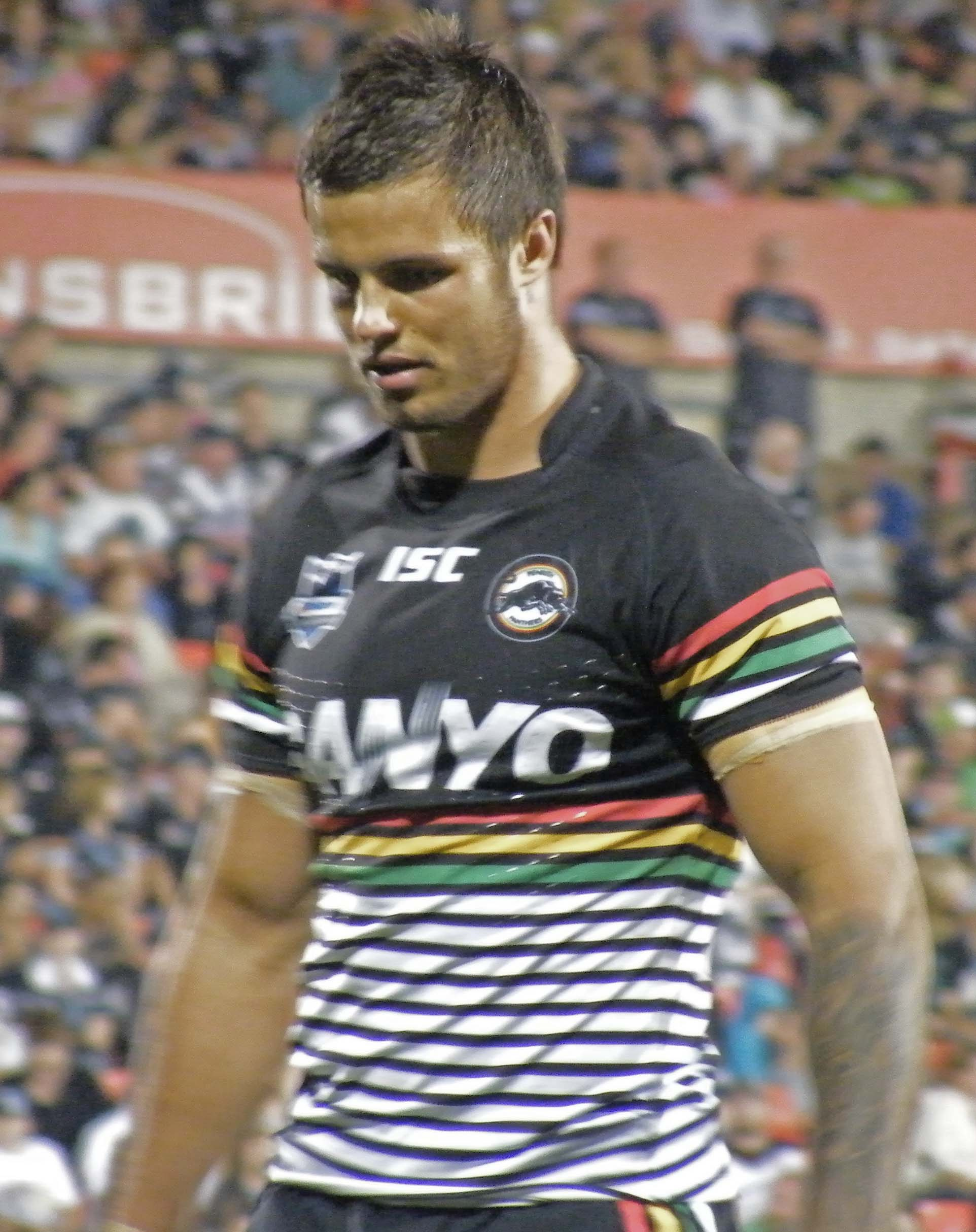
Earl playing for the Penrith Panthers

=== Penrith Panthers ===
The following season, he signed for the Penrith Panthers and was named the club's top rookie player. His 2010 season was capped by scoring a spectacular try in the finals against the Canberra Raiders, cartwheeling towards the try line and planting the ball over it while his body was suspended over the sideline. However, Penrith lost the match and were knocked out of the finals the following week, losing to Earl's old club, the Sydney Roosters.

Earl played for Penrith's feeder club the Windsor Wolves in the New South Wales Cup Grand Final which they lost to Canterbury-Bankstown.

In 2011, Earl played few games before being ruled out for the season with a shoulder injury. There was then talk that he had signed a contract with the Melbourne Storm. This was later proved false and that he had resigned with the Penrith club for two years.

=== Canberra Raiders ===
As of June, 2012 Earl has been released by Penrith to join the Canberra Raiders. In October, 2012 Earl signed to stay with the Canberra club until the end of 2013. On 29 August 2013, Earl was removed from the NRL competition and the Canberra Raiders after he was issued with an infraction notice for the use and trafficking of drugs to which he has admitted to and assisted the Australian Sports Anti-Doping Authority with their investigation.

=== Melbourne Storm ===
On 24 October 2017, it was announced Earl had signed a one-year deal to return to rugby league with the Melbourne Storm after completing his four-year drug ban. On 16 January 2019 Melbourne Storm announced that Earl had signed a two-year Deal with the club. On 22 November 2017, it was revealed that Earl had suffered a torn anterior cruciate ligament (ACL) knee injury at pre-season training with Melbourne, which ruled him out for the entire 2018 NRL season.

After over two thousand days since his last first grade NRL game. Earl made his Melbourne Storm debut in the 2019 NRL season round 5 clash against North Queensland. He had his Melbourne Storm jersey (cap 194) presented to him by Melbourne Storm coach Craig Bellamy.

On 4 December 2020, Earl announced his immediate retirement from the NRL.

== Representative career ==
In 2010 he was named in the New Zealand Māori team that played against England.

== Outside rugby league ==
In 2008, Earl was featured in the "Gods" calendar as a fund raising activity for the breast cancer charity alongside other sportsman of Australia.

In 2024, Earl appeared as "Phoenix" in Gladiators on Channel 10.

== Personal life ==
Earl is currently living in Melbourne, Australia and is Director of Performance at Air Locker Training.

== Doping investigation ==
On 29 August 2013, Earl was stood down from the NRL competition after he was issued with an infraction notice for the use and trafficking of the performance-enhancing drug CJC-1295, a synthetic growth hormone analogue. He admitted the charges and assisted ASADA with their investigation. On 2 June 2014, Sandor's charges of the use of peptides were dropped by ASADA. 18 days after ASADA dropped the charges he won an injunction against the anti-doping investigation, delaying the NRL doping hearing. Earl and his lawyer, Tim Unsworth, fought against the NRL and ASADA. Earl's hearing at the NRL's anti-doping tribunal was postponed in July 2014.

In October 2015, the NRL announced that the Australian Anti-Doping Tribunal had handed Earl a 4-year ban for the following anti-doping rule violations; use of CJC-1295 (eight violations), possession of CJC-1295, trafficking in somatropin, trafficking in clenbuterol, attempted trafficking in SARMS and attempted trafficking in testosterone. The ban was set to run from the date when Earl was provisionally suspended, 29 August 2013, and to end 29 August 2017.
