= Kevin Kingston =

Australian rugby league footballer (born 1983)

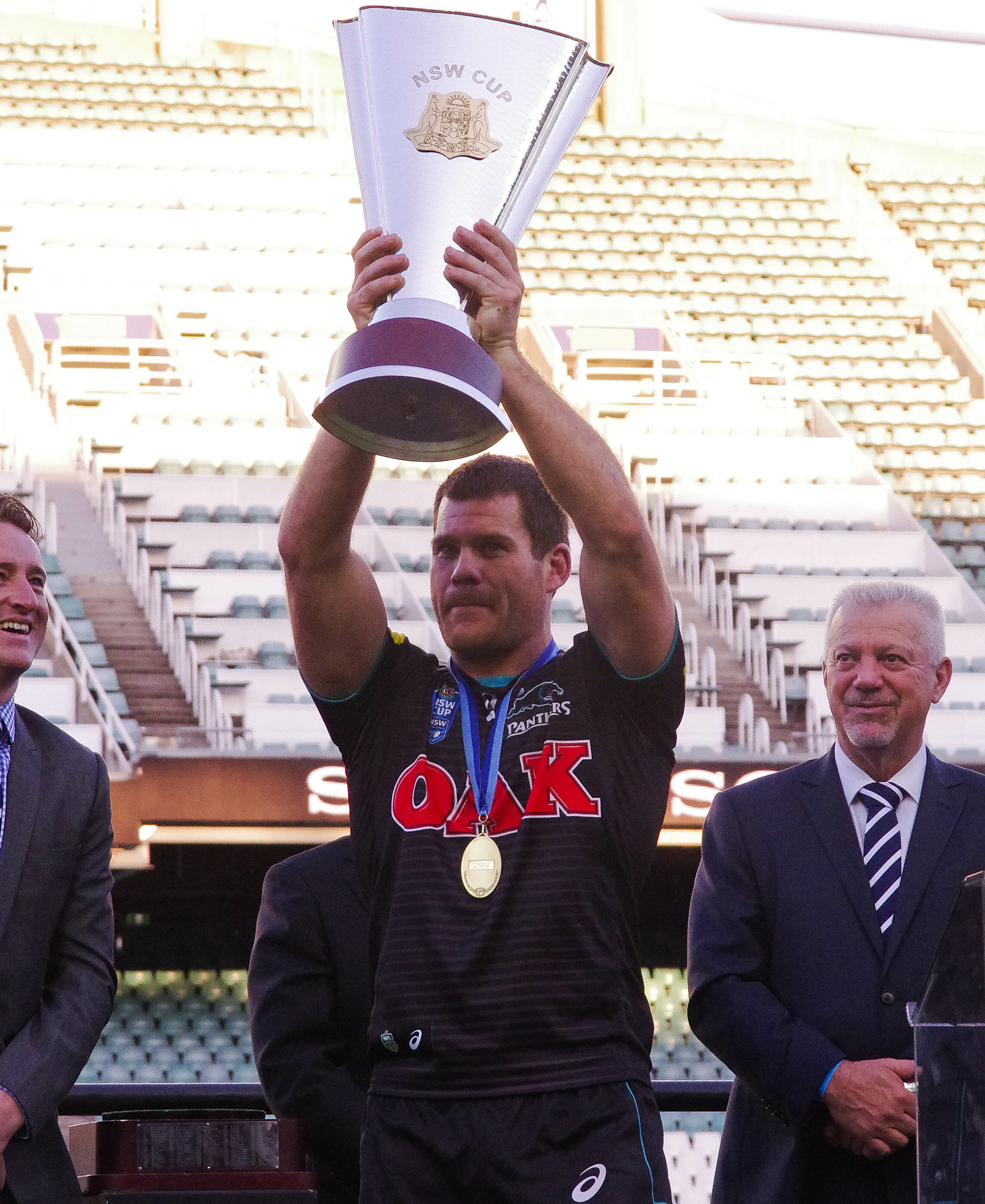

Personal information
- Born: 17 May 1983 (age 41); Babinda, Queensland, Australia

Playing information
- Height: 178 cm (5 ft 10 in)
- Weight: 92 kg (14 st 7 lb)
- Position: Hooker
Club
Years	Team	Pld	T	G	FG	P
2005–08	Cronulla Sharks	59	4	0	0	16
2009	Parramatta Eels	19	2	0	0	8
2010–14	Penrith Panthers	105	18	0	0	72
	Total	183	24	0	0	96
Representative
Years	Team	Pld	T	G	FG	P
2012	Prime Minister's XIII	1	0	0	0	0

Kevin Kingston (born 17 May 1983) is an Australian former professional rugby league footballer who played as a hooker for the Cronulla-Sutherland Sharks, Parramatta Eels and the Penrith Panthers in the National Rugby League (NRL) in the 2000s and 2010s.

He played in Parramatta's 2009 NRL Grand Final loss to Melbourne. Kingston played at representative level for the Prime Minister's XIII in 2012.

== Playing career ==
=== 2005 ===
Kingston made his first grade debut for Cronulla against the Newcastle Knights at Shark Park in round 19 of the 2005 NRL season. Kingston played in the club's elimination final loss to St. George in the same year.

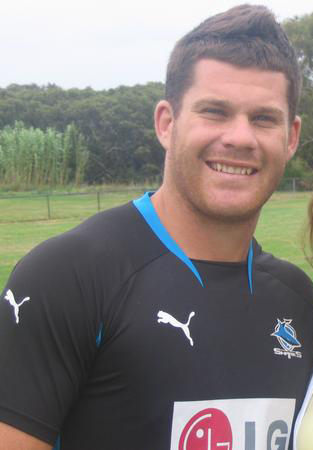
Kingston in 2008

=== 2006–2008 ===
From 2006 through 2008, Kingston was a regular part of the Cronulla-Sutherland Sharks side at hooker or off the bench.

=== 2009 ===
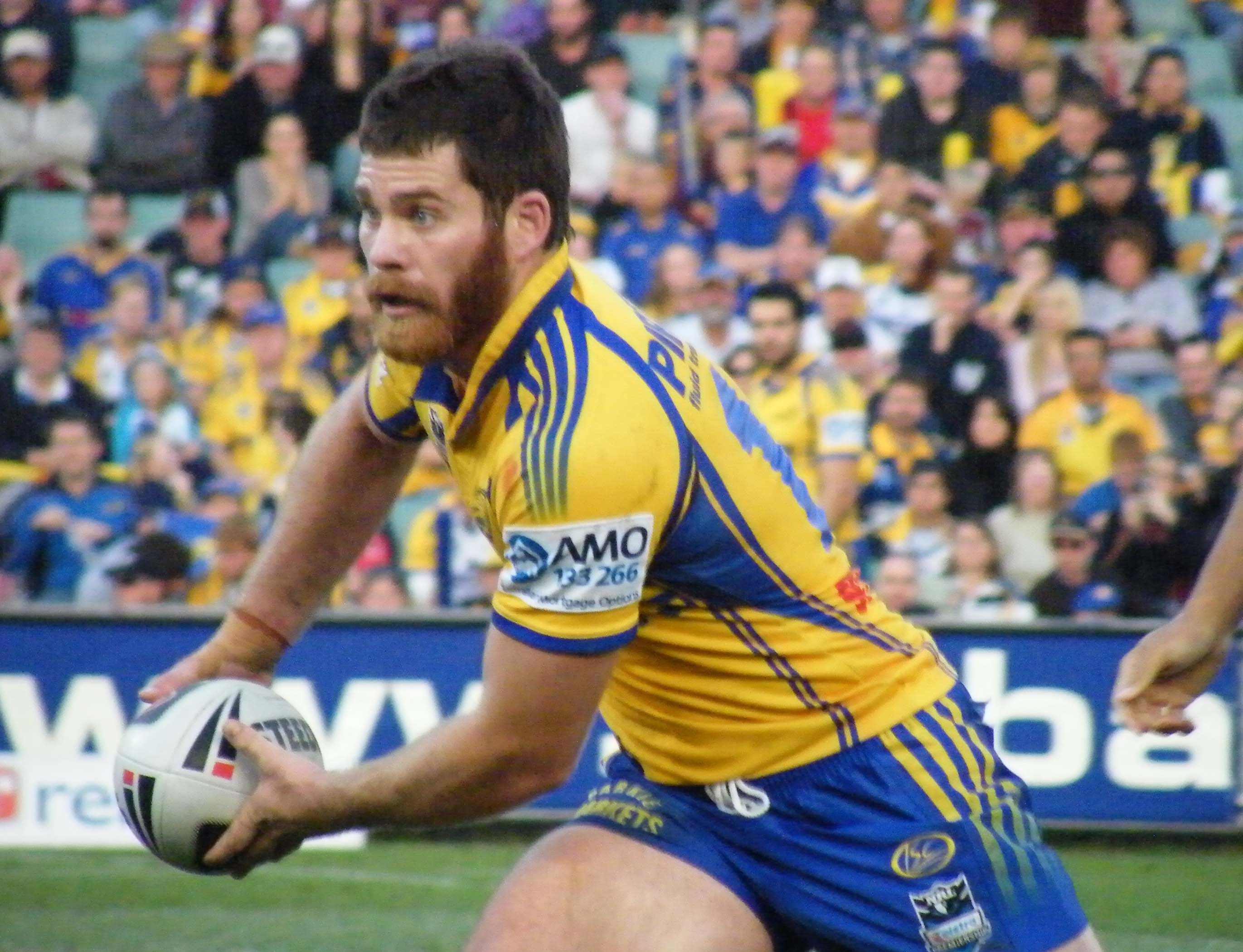
Kingston in 2009

Kingston was signed by the Parramatta Eels for the 2009 NRL season. In round 11 he became a regular part of the Parramatta squad coming off the bench to replace Matt Keating.

Kingston was a major contributor in the club's late-season streak that saw them make it to the 2009 NRL Grand Final. Kingston was not re-signed by the club in 2010 due to salary cap restrictions. Kingston signed with the Penrith Panthers on 20 October 2009 on a one-year contract.

=== 2010 ===
In 2010 Kingston made 24 appearances for the club scoring 6 times. He was an important part of Penrith finishing second. He extended his stay with the club signing until 2013 along with Travis Burns.

=== 2011 ===
Kingston was Penrith's first choice Hooker in the 2011 NRL season. In round 4 though, Kingston was selected to play Half-Back by coach Matthew Elliot while Luke Walsh was out with a shoulder injury. Kingston returned to hooker in the round 5 Heritage Round victory over the Canberra Raiders 36–10.

=== 2012 ===
During 2012, Kingston had a breakthrough season, making the second most tackles in the NRL, as well as scoring three tries. In round 12, when Luke Lewis was stripped of Penrith's captaincy during the State Of Origin period, Kingston was awarded the role and remained there for the rest of the season, following Lewis's announcement of moving to the Cronulla club.

=== 2013 ===
Kingston was announced as captain of the Penrith Panthers for the 2013 NRL season on 2 December 2012.

=== 2014 ===
In 2014, Kingston captained Penrith's reserve grade side as they won the Intrust Super Premiership NSW competition defeating Newcastle 48–12 in the final.

== Career statistics ==
- First Grade Record: 105 appearances scoring 12 tries
