= Travis Burns (rugby league) =

Australian rugby league footballer

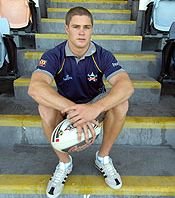

Personal information
- Born: 6 February 1984 (age 42) Texas, Queensland, Australia

Playing information
- Height: 176 cm (5 ft 9 in)
- Weight: 86 kg (13 st 8 lb)
- Position: Five-eighth, Hooker, Halfback
Club
Years	Team	Pld	T	G	FG	P
2005–07	Manly Sea Eagles	38	3	17	0	46
2008–09	North Qld Cowboys	34	7	0	0	28
2010–12	Penrith Panthers	55	13	25	1	103
2013–14	Hull Kingston Rovers	49	9	80	2	198
2015–16	St Helens	34	4	28	0	72
2016(loan)	→ Leigh Centurions	8	3	4	0	20
	Total	218	39	154	3	467
Representative
Years	Team	Pld	T	G	FG	P
2013	Exiles	1	0	0	0	0

Travis Burns (born 6 February 1984) is an Australian former professional rugby league footballer. He formerly played for St Helens in the Super League and the Penrith Panthers in the NRL. He now plays and coaches for the Wattles Rugby league club in Clifton Queensland

== Playing career ==
Burns made his first grade debut for Manly-Warringah in round 18 of the 2005 NRL season against Penrith at Penrith Park.

Burns was the rookie of the year in 2006 for the Manly-Warringah Sea Eagles. Burns played both finals games for Manly-Warringah that year as the club were eliminated by St. George Illawarra. In the 2007 NRL season, he played 12 games for Manly but did not feature in the club's finals campaign or the 2007 NRL Grand Final loss to Melbourne.

Burns signed a three-year deal to play five-eighth for the North Queensland Cowboys, starting in 2008. Burns missed numerous games in his first season due to injuries and suspension.

After only two years at the North Queensland club, Burns signed a two-year contract with the Penrith Panthers prior to the 2010 NRL season.

Burns made his début for the Penrith Panthers in round 1, 2010, against the Canberra Raiders alongside Adrian Purtell, Kevin Kingston and Nigel Plum. Burns scored his first try for the club in round 6 against the New Zealand Warriors with the Panthers winning 40–12. Burns played 19 games for the Panthers in 2010 scoring 4 times. Burns alongside Kevin Kingston both signed extensions with the Penrith club until the 2013 NRL season.

Burns played for Hull KR, and was their regular kicker, having scored 48 goals in 14 appearances during the 2014 season.

In September 2014, Burns signed a three-year contract to play for St Helens RLFC. St Helens paid in the region of £60,000 to secure his services from Hull KR.
