= Phil Gould (rugby league) =

Australian rugby league footballer, coach, administrator, broadcaster and journalist

Phil Gould AM
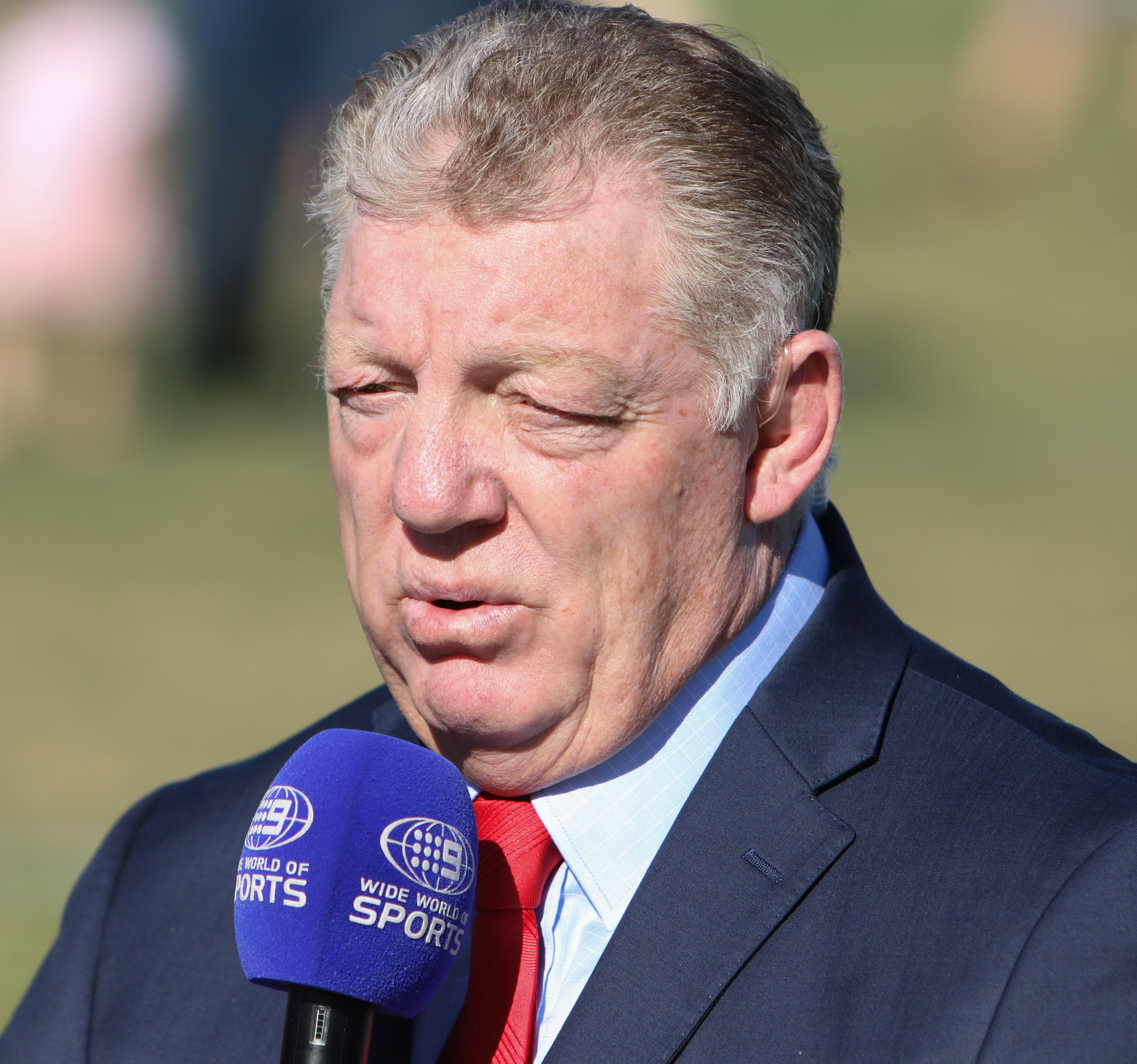

Personal information
- Full name: Phillip Ronald Gould
- Born: 24 January 1958 (age 68) Sydney, New South Wales, Australia

Playing information
- Height: 180 cm (5 ft 11 in)
- Position: Second-row
Club
Years	Team	Pld	T	G	FG	P
1976–80	Penrith Panthers	23	2	49	1	105
1981–82	Newtown Jets	17	2	7	0	20
1983–85	Canterbury Bulldogs	40	3	1	0	13
1986	South Sydney	23	1	0	0	4
	Total	103	8	57	1	142

Coaching information
Club
Years	Team	Gms	W	D	L	W%
1988–89	Canterbury Bulldogs	47	29	2	16	62
1990–94	Penrith Panthers	109	61	4	44	56
1995–99	Sydney Roosters	124	76	2	46	61
	Total	280	166	8	106	59
Representative
Years	Team	Gms	W	D	L	W%
1992–96	New South Wales	15	9	0	6	60
2002–04	New South Wales	9	5	1	3	56

Phillip Ronald Gould AM (born 24 January 1958), also nicknamed "Gus", is an Australian rugby league broadcaster, journalist, administrator and formerly a player and coach. He works as the General Manager of Football for the Canterbury-Bankstown Bulldogs in the National Rugby League (NRL).

== Background ==
Gould was born in Sydney, New South Wales in January 1958. He played junior rugby league with Wentworthville Magpies.

== Playing career ==
Graded by Penrith in 1976, he spent two years in the lower grades, before becoming a regular first-grader in 1979. Following the retirement of Penrith's British import star Mike Stephenson, Gould was selected as captain of the Panthers at the age of 20, becoming the youngest New South Wales Rugby League premiership captain since Dave Brown led Easts in the 1930s. The 1979 season marked the beginning of injury troubles for Gould which ultimately kept him on the sidelines for most of 1980 and which recurred later in his career. Specifically Gould suffered an eye injury which posed a risk of separation of the retina.

Gould moved to Newtown in 1981, where Warren Ryan was still honing his innovative coaching approach that transformed the way that top-grade rugby league was played in Australia throughout the next decade. After being also-rans for many years, a turnaround was achieved when Newtown made the 1981 Grand Final against Parramatta, though losing 20–11.

Gould signed with Canterbury in 1983 under Ted Glossop, losing in the final to Parramatta 18–4. By now Gould had become regarded as an astute ball-playing forward. Years of playing "smart" to avoid further eye damage had tuned his ball distribution and organising skills. In 1984, under Warren Ryan at Canterbury, Gould was expected to be selected for City Firsts. However, he broke his ankle the afternoon before the selections were announced and did not get back to first grade before season's end, taking no part in the club's 6–4 Grand Final win over Parramatta.

Injuries also took a toll on Gould's 1985 season with Canterbury. He played only 14 first-grade games that year and captained the reserve-grade side into the semi-finals.

After leaving Canterbury at the end of that season, Gould played the final year of his career with South Sydney in 1986, taking the field in 23 first-grade games. It was a springboard to his coaching career as Souths coach George Piggins – himself in his inaugural coaching year – welcomed Gould's opinion and insight on tactics and encouraged Gould to take a leadership role. Souths finished as runner-up in the minor premiership and Piggins was awarded Dally M coach of the year.

Overall, in his playing career, Gould made 103 first-grade appearances across four clubs.

== Coaching career ==
=== National Rugby League ===
A successful coaching career followed for Gould. His first five coaching seasons brought two premierships (with Canterbury in 1988 and Penrith in 1991) and a loss in a Grand Final (with Penrith in 1990). Following their 1991 grand final victory, Gould travelled with the Panthers to England for the 1991 World Club Challenge which was lost to Wigan.

While coach of the Panthers, during a 1994 match Gould was sent from his seat on the sideline to the dressing room by referee Bill Harrigan. Gould left Penrith for the Sydney City Roosters in 1995 (officially coaching the Roosters for the final game of the 1994 season after having departed Penrith mid-season), at a stage when the once high-flying Roosters club was continually dwelling at the bottom of the ladder. Before joining Easts, the Roosters had made the finals only once since 1983. A long rebuilding phase followed under Gould, enabling them to make some quality signings, one of the most important being Brad Fittler, the champion five-eighth/centre who had a close association with Gould at Penrith and with the NSW Blues. The Roosters were consistent semi-finalists from 1996 to 2004, though no Grand Final appearances came until 2000, the year after Gould had stepped down as coach and had been replaced in the top job by Graham Murray. Further Grand Final appearances followed in 2002, 2003 and 2004 under Ricky Stuart, who won a premiership in 2002, the Roosters' first since 1975.

=== State of Origin ===
In 1992, Gould took over as coach of New South Wales in the State of Origin series. The Blues were victorious for the next three series. In 1995, at the start of the Super League war, Gould's NSW side lost 3–0 to the Paul Vautin-coached team of relative unknowns patched together from the ranks of Queenlanders loyal to the ARL. The following year, NSW completed a series whitewash of its own with the Brad Fittler-captained Blues becoming the first and only team to go through a series with the same unchanged squad of 17 players. Gould then stood down, having inspired four NSW series wins in five years.

Gould returned to State of Origin coaching New South Wales from 2002 to 2004, winning two series and drawing the third. To date, he has been the most successful New South Wales coach.

== Coaching director ==
During Ricky Stuart's tenure as coach at the Sydney Roosters Gould filled a role as Coaching Director at the club.

In May 2011, it was announced that Gould would take up the role of General Manager with the Penrith Panthers. The role was said by club chairman Don Feltis to include direct involvement in all aspects of the football club management particularly the coaching and team support operation. He left the club in 2019. During his time at Penrith, Gould stated that it would be a five-year plan in order to turn the clubs fortunes around.

On 6 September 2019 it was announced that Phil Gould had joined the St. George Illawarra club as part of the end of season review and would take up a permanent spot at the club in 2020 He would not end up fulfilling this role.

In August 2020, Gould was announced to be joining the New Zealand Warriors as a club-wide consultant.

It was announced on 16 July 2021 that Phil Gould had been released from his official role with the Warriors to become the General Manager of the Canterbury-Bankstown Bulldogs. Gould would continue to have a link with the Warriors to provide assistance to their pathways staff.

On 2 May 2024, Gould was fined $20,000 and given a breach notice by the NRL following comments he made around the state of the game and refereeing decisions. In the 2025 NRL season, Gould came under scrutiny by sections of the media and by supporters for the recruitment of Wests Tigers player Lachlan Galvin. Gould initially told the media that he had never spoken to Galvin and that the club had no interest in signing him but later announced his signature weeks afterwards. Galvin's inclusion in the squad was reported to have caused disharmony as he had been earmarked to take over from starting halfback Toby Sexton with Sexton being demoted to the interchange bench or out of the team. Some sections of the media labelled this the "Galvin Effect" as after Galvin's inclusion of the team was confirmed, the club slid from first on the table to fourth before being eliminated from the finals in straight sets.

== Commentary ==
Gould currently works as an expert for Channel 9 and Triple M radio during rugby league telecasts, including NRL, State of Origin and International rugby league contests. He also does a weekly podcast called ‘Six Tackles with Gus’ co-hosted by Mathew Thompson. He also writes for the Sydney Morning Herald. He is considered controversial within rugby league fan circles for his blunt opinions about the playing and administration of the game, as well as his catchphrases including "dear oh dear oh dear", "no no no no no" and "let the ball bounce, you invite disappointment into your life".

== Honours ==
In the 2014 Queen's Birthday Honours List, Gould was appointed as a Member of the Order of Australia (AM), for "significant service to rugby league football as an administrator, commentator, coach and player, and to the community".

== Gambling ==
In 2011, Gould spoke at a rally in favour of poker machines in which he called Julia Gillard "the worst prime minister in Australia's history" in part because of her proposed gambling reforms. The same year while commenting on a game for Channel Nine Gould announced "the proposed mandatory pre-commitment that they’ve put forward is rubbish policy. It won’t work, it won’t solve the problem they say they’re going to target, and it will do irreparable damage to the hospitality industry. It won’t work, and it will hurt. You’re 100 per cent right. I’ve never seen a more stupid policy in my life.” This comment was the subject of a complaint to the ACMA who ruled it was not political comment.

Sporting positions
Preceded by Mike Stephenson; 197?–1978	Captain; Penrith Panthers; 1979	Succeeded by Darryl Brohman; 1980
