= 1998 Melbourne Storm season =

- NRL Rank: 3rd
- Play-off result: Semi-final Loss
- 1998 record: Wins: 17; draws: 1; losses: 6
- Points scored: For: 546; against: 372

Team information
- Chairman: John Ribot
- Coach: Chris Anderson
- Captain: Glenn Lazarus (18 matches) Tawera Nikau (9 matches)
- Stadium: Olympic Park
- Avg. attendance: 12,716 (Note: Regular season home matches in Melbourne only)
- High attendance: 20,522 (Round 4) (Note: Regular season home matches in Melbourne only)

Top scorers
- Tries: Scott Hill (14), Marcus Bai (14)
- Goals: Craig Smith (51)
- Points: Craig Smith (110)
List of seasons	1999 →

The 1998 Melbourne Storm season was the first in the club's history. They competed in the NRL's inaugural Premiership with the new team reaching the top of the ladder in round 15 and finishing the regular season in third place, only one win behind minor premiers Brisbane.

Their first season was a major surprise to many, with critics such as The Sydney Morning Herald's rugby league writer Paul Kent saying in March of their prospects: "with their purple chests, the slash of gold, the Storm form one of the more strikingly visible outfits in the competition. Kind of like a Violet Crumble. Their performances won't be nearly as tasty."

Adopting coach Chris Anderson's new "flat-line" attack, the big Storm forwards laid a platform for their young halves Scott Hill and Brett Kimmorley to wreak havoc on opposing teams. Melbourne's front-rowers Glenn Lazarus, Robbie Kearns and Rodney Howe were all selected to play for New South Wales in the 1998 State of Origin series. A late season injury to captain Lazarus combined with a lack of finals experience saw the Storm knocked out in the play-offs. The club though had proven they were to be taken seriously, and they had easily produced the best debut season of any new team in the game's history.

== Season summary ==
- 11 January – Melbourne sign former Hunter Mariners players Brett Kimmorley, Scott Hill, John Carlaw, and Paul Marquet to mostly complete their roster ahead of the season. Melbourne had previously signed two former Mariners players Robbie Ross and Richard Swain. The signature of Kimmorley was particularly crucial for the new club, with the Illawarra Steelers keen to sign the former Super League Australia test halfback.
- 21 January – Captain Glenn Lazarus was officially ruled out of playing in the pre-season fixtures. Lazarus had broken his ankle in July 1997 and was not able to return for his former club during the 1997 season.
- 25 January – Bookmakers install Melbourne as the $2.50 favourite to win the inaugural NRL wooden spoon.
- 7 February – Wearing white jerseys, Melbourne win their first preseason trial match against Adelaide Rams in Hobart in front of 2,500 fans at the North Hobart Oval. Brett Kimmorley scored the first try in club colours. In the absence of Glenn Lazarus, New Zealand international Tawera Nikau captained the Storm squad. Ahead of the match, the team visited the site of the Port Arthur massacre to pay their respects to the victims.

This is an historic occasion for rugby league.
Everybody in rugby league believed the game would one day come to Melbourne and I'm just proud to be part of the organisation which finally made that hope come through.

— John Ribot, Melbourne Storm launch, 1998
- 12 February – At the club's season launch, John Ribot reveals the official uniform of navy blue jerseys with a stylised white and purple chevron design, worn with navy blue shorts and socks. It was reported that Ribot was looking to sell up to 51% of his ownership in the club back to News Limited in order to "share around the bills." Ribot later said that his intention was always to form a consortium to run the club. At the launch, former News Limited chairman Ken Cowley was appointed the Storm's foundation chairman.
- 28 February – In their final preseason match in front of 6,000 spectators at Albury, Melbourne were level at 12-all against the Canberra Raiders at half time, before the experienced Raiders team scored a 34–16 victory. Five-eighth Scott Hill suffered an arm injury in the match, but was later cleared of serious injury.
- Round 1 – Melbourne upset Illawarra Steelers to record their inaugural premiership victory, with Scott Hill scoring the club's first tries. Hill's second try, converted by winger Craig Smith with two minutes remaining in the match, gave Melbourne their first lead of the match. The Storm were only the fourth non-foundation team to win on debut, and only the second to win away from home. Brett Kimmorley would later receive a warning letter from the NRL Judiciary following a high tackle on Illawarra's Craig Wilson, while Aaron Moule suffered a dislocated shoulder which kept him out for two months.
- Round 3 – Melbourne extend their undefeated start to the season, earning a 26–18 win against the 1997 Super League runners-up Cronulla Sharks. Interchange forward Russell Bawden scored two tries in the match, while hooker Danny Williams was reported for a reckless tackle on Dean Treister. Williams was later suspended for three matches.
- Round 4 – A record crowd of 20,522 watch unbeaten Melbourne play their first home game at Olympic Park. With chaotic scenes outside the ground, fans are allowed to sit on the running track after half time due to overcrowding. Paul Marquet scored the first try for the club at their redeveloped home venue.
- Round 5 – On Good Friday, the Auckland Warriors inflict the Storm's first defeat of the season in a 16–12 victory in New Zealand. Melbourne had led early after referee Bill Harrigan missed a forward pass from Tawara Nikau to Marcus Bai for the Storm's first try. The Storm had a chance late in the match to steal the win after the Warriors were penalised, only for Melbourne to lose possession.
- Round 6 – Late tries to Marcus Bai and Rodney Howe saw Melbourne break a 22–all tie after 65 minutes, to defeat Parramatta 32–22. Following the match, prop forwards Glenn Lazarus and Rodney Howe were selected in the Australia squad for the match against New Zealand.
- Round 7 – Returning to Olympic Park, Melbourne hold out against a depleted Penrith team, scoring a 22–14 victory. John Carlaw scored two tries in the first half, while both Rodney Howe and Glenn Lazarus backed up from their appearances for Australia against New Zealand the previous evening's test match in Auckland. Howe had been rushed to hospital following the test match with suspected broken ribs, but played through the pain.
- Round 8 – Melbourne thrash the lowly Western Suburbs Magpies 54–16 at Olympic Park, with Robbie Ross scoring two tries and Craig Smith converting all nine tries to score 18 points. The Storm led 30–4 at half time after the visitors scored the opening try of the match.
- Round 9 – In the last of three straight home matches, two length of the field intercept tries to Dragons winger Nathan Blacklock helped St George to an upset 18–14 win over Melbourne to end the club's unbeaten run at Olympic Park. Melbourne led 14–12 at half time after tries to Russell Bawden and Danny Williams, but were shut out in the second half. Disappointed club executives later meeting with broadcaster Nine Network after the match was not shown live or replayed on either free-to-air or pay television.
- Round 10 – Aaron Moule returned from injury, scoring a try in the club's 14–6 win over South Sydney.
- Round 11 – Melbourne and Illawarra Steelers play out a 14–all draw, with Melbourne denied four second half tries after leading 14–4 at half time. Illawarra goalkicker Rod Wishart had a chance to win the match in the dying minutes, but his conversion attempt was waved away. Glenn Lazarus scored his first try of the season, meaning every member of the club's inaugural team had scored at least one try during the season. Steelers player Shaun Timmins was sent off for a high tackle on Melbourne fullback Robbie Ross during the second half. Referee Paul Simpkins was later dropped from the next weekend of matches after a number of errors, including denying Melbourne a late try to Danny Williams, instead ruling that Williams was held up over the line without consulting his in-goal touch judge.
- Round 12 – Melbourne record the biggest win by a debut team in premiership history, thrashing Gold Coast Chargers 62–6 in that club's heaviest defeat in their history. Melbourne running in 11 tries to one in the match, with Robbie Ross and Scott Hill both scoring two tries. In a bid for more television coverage, Melbourne moved the start time of the match forward to 12:30pm after the club's previous four matches were not broadcast.
- Round 13 – Missing key forwards Rodney Howe and Glenn Lazarus after their efforts for NSW in State of Origin, Brett Kimmorley kicks the club's first field goal, in a 25–16 win over Balmain Tigers at Leichhardt Oval. Anthony Bonus became the twenty-second player used by the club, the former Parramatta Eels player last played first grade in 1996. Bonus had been living in Brisbane and playing for Norths Devils and only met the bulk of the Storm squad the day before the match. Forward Robbie Kearns had spent a day in hospital in the lead-up to the match after suffering a bout of tonsillitis.
- Round 14 – Melbourne take home the "Southern States Cup," defeating the Adelaide Rams 24–4. Playing into a strong breeze in the first half, Scott Hill scored two tries, with Marcus Bai adding another for an 18–0 lead at the break. Papua New Guinea rookie John Wilshere made his debut for the club after impressing for Norths Devils where he was the leading points scorer in the Queensland Cup competition.
- Round 15 – After defeating North Queensland Cowboys 10–8 in Townsville, Melbourne finish the weekend on top of the NRL ladder for the first time. Melbourne led 8–6 at halftime, with both teams only adding penalty goals in the second half. Craig Smith slotting a pressure penalty goal to break an 8–8 score with 10 minutes to go.
- 26 June – Rodney Howe is revealed as the third NRL player in 1998 to test positive to a banned substance.
- Round 16 – A controversial try after the final siren to Tony Tatupu hands the Auckland Warriors a 24–21 victory at Olympic Park. Video referee Peter Filmer watched the replay more than eight times, taking five minutes to make the decision, missing two offside Warriors players and a forward pass in the movement. The Warriors had led 14–4 at half time, after referee Moghseen Jadwat denied Melbourne a try to Robbie Ross due to a supposed forward pass.
- Round 17 – Brisbane Broncos defeat Melbourne 34–16 in front of a crowd of 35,119 — the highest attendance to watch Melbourne, and the second highest crowd in the 1998 regular season. Brisbane scored three tries in the final 10 minutes to put away the Storm after the match had been evenly poised for much of the contest.
- 7 July – It's confirmed that Aaron Moule will miss the remainder of the season after he was forced to have surgery on his injured shoulder. Moule had missed two months of matches earlier in the season with the injury, returning to play seven matches through the middle of the season.
- 9 July – Rodney Howe is suspended for 22 matches by the ARL drugs tribunal for taking two performance-enhancing drugs. Howe received the maximum penalty available under the ARL policy. Howe was accused of taking the anabolic steroid stanozolol to aid the recovery of a knee injury.
- Round 18 – After back-to-back losses, Melbourne bounce back with a 22–12 win against Manly. In the face of a lopsided amount of possession and penalties, the Storm were able to walk off with the two competition points, though Robbie Kearns (arm) and Glenn Lazarus (groin) both picked up injuries in the match. Kearns was also put on report by referee Brian Grant for a high tackle on Manly's Russell Gartner. Kearns was later cleared by the match reviewers. Earlier, the match had started over 20 minutes later than advertised due to heavy traffic delaying fans access to Olympic Park. Following the match, club CEO Chris Johns was assaulted by a Manly supporter while celebrating the result at Crown Casino while talking with Manly players.
- Round 19 – Missing six players through injury or suspension, Melbourne suffered their worst defeat of the season so far, losing 34–10 to the North Sydney Bears. The match had been tied 10–all at half time, before the Bears ran away with it in the second half, scoring six tries to none.
- July 23 – Melbourne were forced to deny that a second player had tested positive to performance-enhancing drugs in the lead up to their match against the Newcastle Knights. The club had come under fire for allowing Rodney Howe to continue training with the playing group and paying him while suspended.
- Round 20 – Marcus Bai scores the first hat-trick in club history in a 32–16 win against 1997 ARL premiers the Newcastle Knights, to cement a top four spot on the NRL ladder. Bai scoring two tries in the second half as the fog rolled in at Olympic Park with temperatures dropping. Unfortunately for the Storm, both Robbie Ross and Glenn Lazarus picked up hamstring injuries in the match. Following the match, the club received a warning from the NRL after suspended forward Rodney Howe was seen sitting with the Storm players and officials on the bench.
- 26 July – Storm physiotherapist Tony Ayoub confirms that both Robbie Ross and Glenn Lazarus had undergone hyperbaric compression chamber treatment on their injured hamstrings, with Lazarus' injury confirmed as more serious than first suspected.

They just recruited very, very well.
They picked some very good players and recruited an excellent coach, Chris Anderson. I rate him very highly.
The other thing is — and I know this sounds strange in light of recent events — but the fact they signed Rodney Howe was also a key. With him, and Lazarus and Robbie Kearns, who also played rep football last year, they had the front-rowers who could go forward all day.
And their halves, Scotty Hill and Brett Kimmorley, were also very highly rated.

— Former Australian coach Arthur Beetson discussing the Storm's first season success, 1 August 1998
- Round 21 – Ignored by key broadcasters with the match between two top eight teams not broadcast on free-to-air television or radio, Melbourne exhibit a level of control against the Sydney City Roosters, comfortably winning 32–20 at the Sydney Football Stadium. Robbie Kearns scored a try on fulltime to seal the result. Melbourne were without injured captain Glenn Lazarus and moved to equal first on the ladder with Brisbane and Newcastle following the result.
- 3 August – Marcus Bai met with Australian Prime Minister John Howard to hand over $15,000 worth of donations raised by the club and supporters in aid of the Papua New Guinea earthquake which had caused devastation to Bai's home country in July.
- Round 22 – Storm players sitting on the bench controversially hold up a paper mask of suspended prop forward Rodney Howe during the club's 20–10 win over the Cronulla Sharks at Olympic Park. John Ribot later apologising for the "childish stunt," with NRL board member and Parramatta CEO Denis Fitzgerald calling for A$5,000 fines for each of the players. The NRL later took no action against the club or the players involved.
- Round 23 – In diabolical weather conditions including torrential rain, and the Belmore Sports Ground field resembling a swimming pool, Melbourne were almost held scoreless for the first time, with a late try to stand-in captain Tawera Nikau the only points for the Storm. Halfback Brett Kimmorley was injured in the first half, not returning to the field after half time.
- Round 24 – Melbourne secure a home final by finishing third on the NRL ladder, ending the regular season with a 16–12 win over Canberra Raiders. Brett Kimmorley, who was in doubt with concussion for the match, scored a try in the second half, leading the Storm around the field in a man of the match performance. Matt Geyer, filling in for the suspended Robbie Ross was also a key performer, fielding a number of kicks from Ricky Stuart in the windy conditions.
- 23 August – In a poll conducted of 100 NRL players, Melbourne coach Chris Anderson received 83 votes to be the clear choice as the coach of the year.
- 27 August – Chris Anderson wins the Dally M Coach of the Year award, with Marcus Bai (wing) and Tawera Nikau (lock forward) making the Team of the Year. Brett Kimmorley finished second behind Newcastle halfback Andrew Johns in the count for the Dally M Medal.
- Preliminary qualifying final – Without captain Glenn Lazarus due to injury, a second half masterclass from Brad Fittler hands Melbourne a 26–12 loss in their NRL finals debut. The Storm had led 12–8 at half time, but struggled to contain Fittler in the second half. Before the game, Melbourne announce their first ever jersey sponsorship deal with the Honda logo appearing on player's sleeves, the deal reported to be worth A$1.5m over three years.
- Elimination quarter final – Melbourne win their first finals game, defeating Canberra Raiders 24–10 to advance to the third week of the five-week finals series. The Storm were again without captain Glenn Lazarus, with the veteran unable to shake a troublesome hamstring injury. Melbourne jumped out to a 16–0 lead during the first half, and extended their advantage early in the second half. Young centre Tony Martin scored two tries, fresh off signing a new contract to stay with the club.
- 6 September – Despite the first year successes, it was revealed the club was poised to lose A$15m due to start-up costs. The club was not expected to be profitable for some time.
- Elimination semi final – Eventual premiers Brisbane Broncos knock Melbourne out of the 1998 NRL finals, in a game played at the Sydney Football Stadium. Melbourne putting in their worst performance of the season were down 10–2 at half time and were never in the contest, Matt Geyer crossing for a late consolation try. Glenn Lazarus was still unavailable for the match, despite hope that he would be play when named in the team before the match. Also unavailable was first choice goalkicker Craig Smith.
- 19 September – Storm feeder team Norths Devils win the 1998 Queensland Cup Grand Final, featuring a number of players who played for Melbourne in 1998.

=== Milestone games ===
Round	Player	Milestone
Round 1	See inaugural team	Storm debuts
Round 1	Ben Roarty	NRL debut
Round 2	Robbie Ross	50th game
Round 2	Matt Geyer	Storm debut
Round 4	Wayne Evans	Storm debut
Round 4	Ben Anderson	NRL debut
Round 7	Tony Martin	Storm debut
Round 13	Anthony Bonus	Storm debut
Round 13	Wade Fenton	NRL debut
Round 14	John Wilshere	Storm debut
Round 15	Daniel Frame	NRL debut
Round 16	Matt Rua	NRL debut
Round 19	Chris Anderson	200th NRL game coached
Round 20	Tristan Brady-Smith	Storm debut
Preliminary qualifying final	Paul Marquet	150th game

=== Jerseys ===
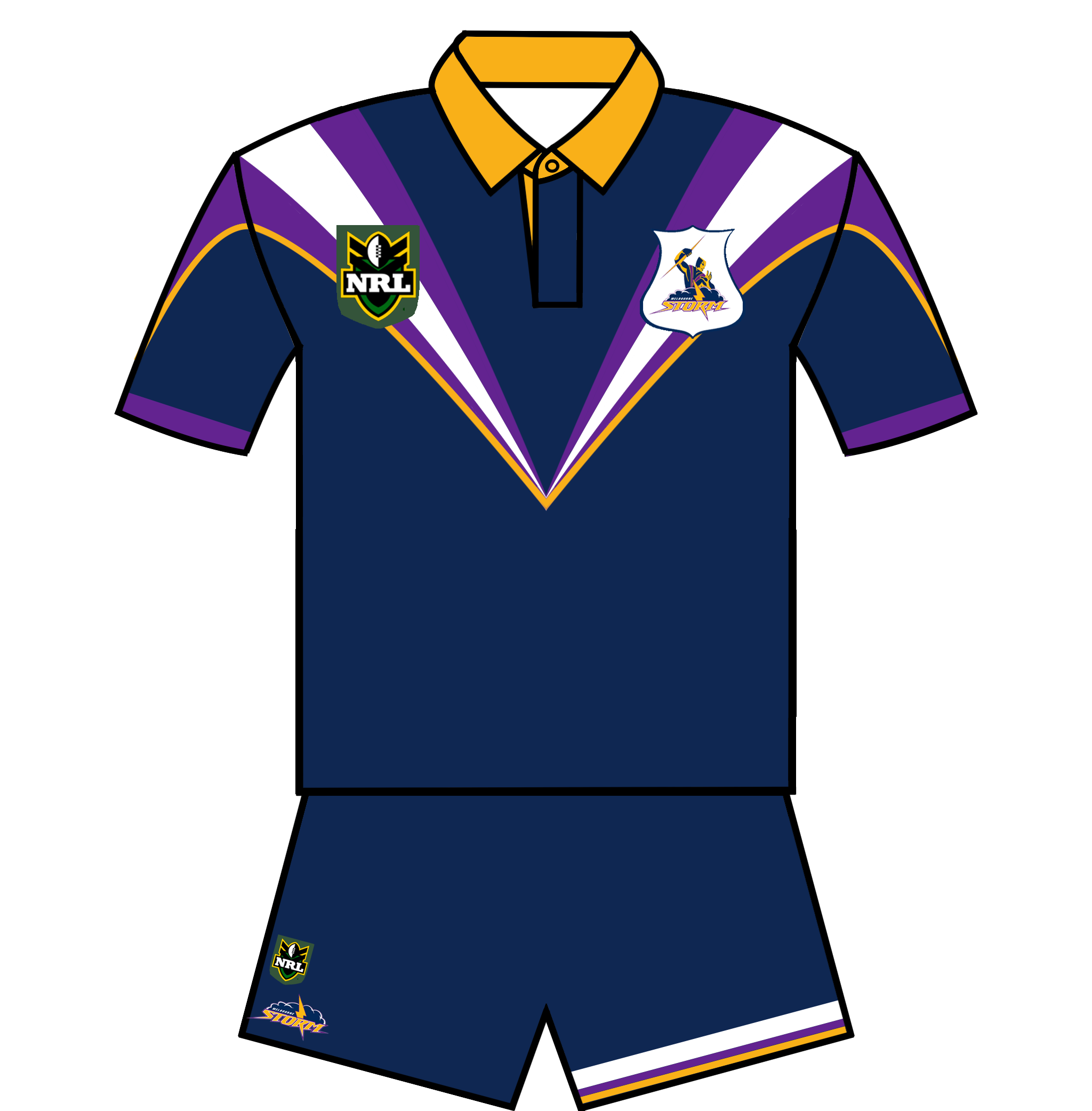
1998 home jersey

Melbourne's inaugural jerseys were navy blue jerseys with a stylised white and purple chevron design, with gold trim and collars, worn with navy blue shorts and socks. Until late in the season, there were no advertising logos, except that of manufacturer Nike. Unusually, Melbourne carried on the Super League innovation of having player names on the back of jerseys, ostensibly to assist new fans to identify players. The team wore the predominately blue jerseys in every game in 1998, except for the round 15 game against North Queensland Cowboys, when a predominately white jersey was worn with white shorts and socks. Midway through the season, the club signed a sponsorship deal with Fila worth an estimated A$1.5m over three years.

== Fixtures ==
=== Preseason ===
Date	Rd	Opponent	Venue	Result	Mel.	Opp.	Tries	Goals	Field goals	Ref
7 February	Trial	Adelaide Rams	North Hobart Oval, Hobart	Won	26	22	J Wilshere (2), T Brady-Smith, B Kimmorley, M Bai	M Geyer 3/5		
28 February	Trial	Canberra Raiders	Lavington Sports Ground, Albury	Lost	16	34	S Hill, R Swain, P Marquet	M Geyer 2/3		

=== Regular season ===
==== Result by round ====
Round	1	2	3	4	5	6	7	8	9	10	11	12	13	14	15	16	17	18	19	20	21	22	23	24
Ground	A	A	A	H	A	A	H	H	H	A	H	H	A	H	A	H	A	H	A	H	A	H	A	H
Result	W	W	W	W	L	W	W	W	L	W	D	W	W	W	W	L	L	W	L	W	W	W	L	W
Position	10	5	4	4	4	4	3	2	4	3	3	3	2	2	1	2	2	2	4	3	2	2	4	3
Points	2	4	6	8	8	10	12	14	14	16	17	19	21	23	25	25	25	27	27	29	31	33	33	35

Source: Rugby League Tables
A = Away; H = Home; N = Neutral; B = Bye; W = Win; D = Draw; L = Loss

==== Matches ====
Date	Rd	Opponent	Venue	Result	Mel.	Opp.	Tries	Goals	Field goals	Ref
14 March	1	Illawarra Steelers	WIN Stadium, Wollongong	Won	14	12	S Hill (2)	C Smith 3/3		
22 March	2	Western Suburbs Magpies	Campbelltown Stadium, Sydney	Won	26	16	M Bai, P Bell, R Kearns, R Ross, D Williams	C Smith 3/8		
28 March	3	Cronulla-Sutherland Sharks	Shark Park, Sydney	Won	26	18	R Bawden (2), M Bai, S Hill, R Swain	C Smith 3/5		
3 April	4	North Sydney Bears	Olympic Park, Melbourne	Won	24	16	M Bai, S Hill, P Marquet, C Smith	C Smith 4/5		
10 April	5	Auckland Warriors	Ericsson Stadium, Auckland	Lost	12	16	M Bai, P Bell	C Smith 2/2		
19 April	6	Parramatta Eels	Parramatta Stadium, Sydney	Won	32	22	M Bai, J Carlaw, R Howe, B Kimmorley, T Nikau, R Ross	C Smith 4/6		
25 April	7	Penrith Panthers	Olympic Park, Melbourne	Won	22	14	J Carlaw (2), P Bell, R Kearns	C Smith 3/6		
1 May	8	Western Suburbs Magpies	Olympic Park, Melbourne	Won	54	16	R Ross (2), R Bawden, J Carlaw, S Hill, R Kearns, P Marquet, B Roarty, D Williams	C Smith 9/10		
8 May	9	St George Dragons	Olympic Park, Melbourne	Lost	14	18	R Bawden, D Williams	C Smith 3/4		
15 May	10	South Sydney Rabbitohs	Sydney Football Stadium, Sydney	Won	14	6	P Bell, A Moule	C Smith 3/3		
24 May	11	Illawarra Steelers	Olympic Park, Melbourne	Draw	14	14	G Lazarus, R Ross	C Smith 3/3		
31 May	12	Gold Coast Chargers	Olympic Park, Melbourne	Won	62	6	S Hill (2), R Ross (2), M Bai, R Bawden, B Kimmorley, P Marquet, T Martin, T Nikau, D Williams	T Martin 6/8, B Kimmorley 2/3		
7 June	13	Balmain Tigers	Leichhardt Oval, Sydney	Won	25	16	R Bawden (2), A Moule, B Roarty	B Kimmorley 2/4, T Martin 2/2	B Kimmorley	
13 June	14	Adelaide Rams	Olympic Park, Melbourne	Won	24	4	S Hill (2), M Bai, B Roarty	J Wilshere 3/4, B Kimmorley 1/1		
20 June	15	North Queensland Cowboys	Malanda Stadium, Townsville	Won	10	8	R Bawden	C Smith 3/4		
27 June	16	Auckland Warriors	Olympic Park, Melbourne	Lost	21	24	S Hill, T Martin, T Nikau, R Ross	C Smith 2/5	B Kimmorley	
3 July	17	Brisbane Broncos	ANZ Stadium, Brisbane	Lost	16	34	M Bai, B Kimmorley, R Ross	C Smith 2/3		
10 July	18	Manly Warringah Sea Eagles	Olympic Park, Melbourne	Won	22	12	P Bell, W Evans, T Martin, C Smith	C Smith 2/2, B Kimmorley 1/2		
17 July	19	North Sydney Bears	North Sydney Oval, Sydney	Lost	10	34	J Carlaw, R Swain	B Kimmorley 1/2		
24 July	20	Newcastle Knights	Olympic Park, Melbourne	Won	32	16	M Bai (3), S Hill, B Kimmorley, R Swain	B Kimmorley 4/7		
2 August	21	Sydney City Roosters	Sydney Football Stadium, Sydney	Won	32	20	P Bell, T Brady-Smith, J Carlaw, S Hill, R Kearns, P Marquet	B Kimmorley 4/6		
7 August	22	Cronulla-Sutherland Sharks	Olympic Park, Melbourne	Won	20	10	D Williams (2), M Bai, P Bell	B Kimmorley 2/4		
14 August	23	Canterbury-Bankstown Bulldogs	Belmore Sports Ground, Sydney	Lost	4	8	T Nikau	T Martin 0/1		
21 August	24	Canberra Raiders	Olympic Park, Melbourne	Won	16	12	S Hill, B Kimmorley, T Martin	B Kimmorley 2/3		

=== Finals ===
Preliminary qualifying final

Sunday, 30 August
15:00 AEST (UTC+10)

Melbourne Storm	12 – 26	Sydney City Roosters
Tries: 2 Marquet 24'; Bai 34'; Goals: 2 Smith 25', 35' (2/3)	1st: 12–8; 2nd: 0–18; Report	Tries: 4 Fittler 17'; Gourley 42'; Elsegood 58'; Barnett 64'; Goals: 5 Cleary pen 3', 18', 43', 59', 65' (5/6)

Olympic Park, Melbourne
Attendance: 18,247
Referee: Paul McBlane

Elimination quarter final

Saturday, 5 September
15:00 AEST (UTC+10)

Melbourne Storm	24 – 10	Canberra Raiders
Tries: 5 Martin 24', 74'; Geyer 2'; Hill 17'; Bai 35'; Goals: 2 Kimmorley pen 5', 17' (2/6)	1st: 20–0; 2nd: 4–10; Report	Tries: 2 Mullins 56'; Stuart 76'; Goals: 1 Furner 57' (1/1); McNamara (0/1)

Olympic Park, Melbourne
Attendance: 12,592
Referee: Steve Clark

Elimination semi final

Sunday, 13 September
15:00 AEST (UTC+10)

Brisbane Broncos	30 – 6	Melbourne Storm
Tries: 6 Renouf 50', 64'; Campion 26'; Lockyer 28'; Carroll 59'; Lee 73'; Goals: 3 Lockyer 29', 60', 74' (3/6)	1st: 10–2; 2nd: 20–4; Report	Tries: 1 Geyer 77'; Goals: 1 Kimmorley pen 14' (1/2)

Sydney Football Stadium, Sydney
Attendance: 20,354
Referee: Bill Harrigan

== Ladder ==
1998 NRL season
Pos	Team	Pld	W	D	L	PF	PA	PD	Pts
1	Brisbane Broncos (P)	24	18	1	5	688	310	+378	37
2	Newcastle Knights	24	18	1	5	562	381	+181	37
3	Melbourne Storm	24	17	1	6	546	372	+174	35
4	Parramatta Eels	24	17	1	6	468	349	+119	35
5	North Sydney Bears	24	17	0	7	663	367	+296	34
6	Sydney City Roosters	24	16	0	8	680	383	+297	32
7	Canberra Raiders	24	15	0	9	564	429	+135	30
8	St. George Dragons	24	13	1	10	486	490	−4	27
9	Canterbury-Bankstown Bulldogs	24	13	0	11	489	411	+78	26
10	Manly Warringah Sea Eagles	24	13	0	11	503	473	+30	26
11	Cronulla-Sutherland Sharks	24	12	1	11	438	387	+51	25
12	Illawarra Steelers	24	11	1	12	476	539	−63	23
13	Balmain Tigers	24	9	1	14	381	463	−82	19
14	Penrith Panthers	24	8	2	14	525	580	−55	18
15	Auckland Warriors	24	9	0	15	417	518	−101	18
16	North Queensland Cowboys	24	9	0	15	361	556	−195	18
17	Adelaide Rams	24	7	0	17	393	615	−222	14
18	South Sydney Rabbitohs	24	5	0	19	339	560	−221	10
19	Gold Coast Chargers	24	4	0	20	289	654	−365	8
20	Western Suburbs Magpies	24	4	0	20	371	802	−431	8

(P) Premiers

== 1998 Coaching Staff ==
- Head coach: Chris Anderson
- Assistant coaches: Greg Brentnall & Steve Anderson
- Football Manager: Michael Moore
- Head physiotherapist: Tony Ayoub
- Head Trainer: Steve Litvensky
- Trainer: Aaron Salisbury

== 1998 squad ==
List current as of 21 July 2021

Cap (Note: Players are listed with the cap number as they appear on the Melbourne Storm honour board. Additional squad members do not have a cap number.)	Nat.	Player name	Position	First Storm Game	Previous First Grade RL club (Note: This column denotes the previous RL club the player was signed to and played first grade RL for. If they are yet to debut then this is stipulated. If they were merely signed to the club but did not play then it is not counted.)
1	(Australia)	Robbie Ross	FB	1998	(Australia) Hunter Mariners
2	(Australia)	Craig Smith	WG	1998	(Australia) Canterbury-Bankstown Bulldogs (Note: Reserve grade 1997, previous first grade experience with North Sydney Bears in 1994)
3	(Australia)	Aaron Moule	WG, CE	1998	(Australia) South Queensland Crushers
4	(Australia)	Paul Bell	CE	1998	(Australia) Perth Reds
5	(Papua New Guinea)	Marcus Bai	WG	1998	(Australia) Gold Coast Chargers
6	(Australia)	Scott Hill	FE	1998	(Australia) Hunter Mariners
7	(Australia)	Brett Kimmorley	HB	1998	(Australia) Hunter Mariners
8	(Australia)	Rodney Howe	PR	1998	(Australia) Perth Reds
9	(Australia)	Danny Williams	LK, SR, HK	1998	(Australia) North Sydney Bears
10	(Australia)	Robbie Kearns	PR	1998	(Australia) Perth Reds
11	(Australia)	Paul Marquet	PR, SR	1998	(Australia) Hunter Mariners
12	(Australia)	Ben Roarty	PR, SR, LK	1998	(Australia) Melbourne Storm (Note: Canterbury-Bankstown Bulldogs reserve grade 1997)
13	(New Zealand)	Tawera Nikau	LK	1998	(Australia) Cronulla Sharks
14	(Australia)	Glenn Lazarus	PR	1998	(Australia) Brisbane Broncos
15	(New Zealand)	Richard Swain	HK	1998	(Australia) Hunter Mariners
16	(Australia)	Russell Bawden	PR	1998	(England) London Broncos
17	(Australia)	John Carlaw	CE	1998	(Australia) Hunter Mariners
18	(Australia)	Matt Geyer	WG	1998	(Australia) Perth Reds
19	(Australia)	Wayne Evans	SR	1998	(Australia) Perth Reds
20	(Australia)	Ben Anderson	FE	1998	(Australia) Melbourne Storm (Note: Canterbury-Bankstown Bulldogs juniors 1997)
21	(Australia)	Tony Martin	WG, CE	1998	(England) London Broncos
22	(Australia)	Anthony Bonus	PR	1998	(Australia) Illawarra Steelers (Note: Previously released at the end of the 1996 ARL season by Parramatta, played reserve grade for Illawarra in 1997.)
23	(Australia)	Wade Fenton	SR, PR	1998	(Australia) Melbourne Storm
24	(Papua New Guinea)	John Wilshere	CE	1998	(Australia) Perth Reds
25	(Australia)	Daniel Frame	PR, SR	1998	(Australia) Melbourne Storm (Note: Woy Woy Roosters)
26	(New Zealand)	Matt Rua	PR, SR	1998	(Australia) Melbourne Storm (Note: Manly Warringah Sea Eagles reserve grade 1997)
27	(Australia)	Tristan Brady-Smith	WG	1998	(Australia) Perth Reds
—N/a	(Australia)	Ryan Baker	SR	Yet to debut	– (Note: Perth junior, played for Australian Schoolboys rugby league team in 1997)
—N/a	(Australia)	Ryan Gundry	PR	Yet to debut	– (Note: Perth Reds junior in 1997)
—N/a	(New Zealand)	Chris McCausland	FE	Yet to debut	–
—N/a	(Tonga)	David Palavi	HK	Yet to debut	– (Note: Canberra Raiders junior, former Australian Schoolboys rugby union team player)

=== Inaugural Team ===
The first Melbourne Storm team to take to the field in Round 1 of the 1998 NRL season

Melbourne Storm
Inaugural Team	Interchange	Coach
1 Robbie Ross – FB; 2 Craig Smith – WG; 3 Aaron Moule – CE; 4 Paul Bell – CE; 5 Marcus Bai – WG; 6 Scott Hill – FE; 7 Brett Kimmorley – HB; 8 Rodney Howe – PR; 9 Danny Williams – HK; 10 Robbie Kearns – PR; 11 Paul Marquet – SR; 12 Ben Roarty – SR; 13 Tawera Nikau – LK	14 Glenn Lazarus (c); 15 Richard Swain; 16 Russell Bawden; 17 John Carlaw	Head coach: Chris Anderson; Legend: (c) Captain(s); (vc) Vice-captain(s); Updated: 23 July 2020; Source(s): NRL 1998 Round 1

== Representative honours ==
This table lists all players who have played a representative match in 1998.

Player	1998 ANZAC Test	State of Origin 1	State of Origin 2	State of Origin 3	October Test Matches
Rodney Howe	Australia	New South Wales	New South Wales	—N/a	—N/a
Robbie Kearns	—N/a	—N/a	—N/a	New South Wales	Australia
Glenn Lazarus	Australia	—N/a	New South Wales	New South Wales	—N/a

== Statistics ==
This table contains playing statistics for all Melbourne Storm players to have played in the 1998 NRL season.

- Statistics sources:

Name	Appearances	Tries	Goals	Field goals	Points
Ben Anderson	4	0	0	0	0
Marcus Bai	27	14	0	0	56
Russell Bawden	27	8	0	0	32
Paul Bell	25	7	0	0	28
Anthony Bonus	1	0	0	0	0
Tristan Brady-Smith	3	1	0	0	4
John Carlaw	24	6	0	0	24
Wayne Evans	17	1	0	0	4
Wade Fenton	2	0	0	0	0
Daniel Frame	7	0	0	0	0
Matt Geyer	11	2	0	0	8
Scott Hill	26	14	1	0	58
Rodney Howe	12	1	0	0	4
Robbie Kearns	26	4	0	0	16
Brett Kimmorley	27	5	22	2	66
Glenn Lazarus	18	1	0	0	4
Paul Marquet	27	5	0	0	20
Tony Martin	21	6	8	0	40
Aaron Moule	8	2	0	0	8
Tawera Nikau	27	4	0	0	16
Ben Roarty	25	3	0	0	12
Robbie Ross	21	9	0	0	36
Matt Rua	6	0	0	0	0
Craig Smith	17	2	51	0	110
Richard Swain	25	3	0	0	12
Danny Williams	20	6	0	0	24
John Wilshere	1	0	3	0	6
27 players used	–	104	85	2	588

=== Scorers ===
Most points in a game: 18 points

- Round 4 – Craig Smith (9 Goals) vs Western Suburbs Magpies

Most tries in a game: 3

- Round 20 – Marcus Bai vs Newcastle Knights

=== Winning games ===
Highest score in a winning game: 62 points

- Round 12 vs Gold Coast Chargers

Lowest score in a winning game: 10 points

- Round 15 vs North Queensland Cowboys

Greatest winning margin: 54 points

- Round 12 vs Gold Coast Chargers

Greatest number of games won consecutively: 4

- Round 1 – Round 4
- Round 12 – Round 15

=== Losing games ===
Highest score in a losing game: 21 points

- Round 16 vs Auckland Warriors

Lowest score in a losing game: 4 points

- Round 23 vs Canterbury-Bankstown Bulldogs

Greatest losing margin: 24 points

- Round 19 vs North Sydney Bears
- Elimination Preliminary Final vs Brisbane Broncos

Greatest number of games lost consecutively: 2

- Round 16 – Round 17

=== NRL Judiciary ===
A number of Melbourne players were cited by the match review committee for incidents through the 1998 season, with the following results from the NRL Judiciary.

Round	Player	Offence & grade	Result (Note: 100 demerit points equals one match suspension.)	Ref
Round 1	Brett Kimmorley	High tackle	Warning	
Round 3	Danny Williams	Reckless tackle (Grade 3)	3 matches (375 demerit points)	
Round 12	Glenn Lazarus	Careless tackle (Grade 3)	0 matches (99 demerit points)	
Round 15	Danny Williams	Careless tackle	4 matches (425 demerit points)	
Round 16	Scott Hill	Careless tackle (Grade 3)	1 match (150 demerit points)	
Round 18	Ben Roarty	Careless tackle (Grade 2)	2 matches (250 demerit points)	
Round 23	Robbie Ross	Dangerous throw (Grade 1)	1 match (125 demerit points)	
Elimination semi final	Tawera Nikau	Striking (Grade 2)	1 match	
N/A	Rodney Howe	Doping	22 matches	

== Feeder team ==
Upon entry to the NRL, Melbourne Storm signed an affiliation agreement with Queensland Cup team Norths Devils to act as a feeder club and to provide Melbourne players who were not selected to play first grade a match each weekend. Players would fly to Brisbane each week after training in Melbourne to play Queensland Cup, with a number of other junior players also moving to Brisbane to play with the club. The arrangement bore immediate results as the side coached by Mark Murray won the minor premiership. Featuring a number of players who had played for Melbourne in 1998, Norths Devils would go on to win the 1998 Queensland Cup Grand Final 35–18 against Wests Panthers, with Matt Geyer scoring three tries in the match.

1998 Queensland Cup
Pos	Team	Pld	W	D	L	PF	PA	PD	Pts
1	Norths Devils (P)	22	16	1	5	872	394	+478	33

== Awards and honours ==
=== Melbourne Storm Awards Night ===
Held on Friday, 2 October:

- Melbourne Storm Player of the Year: Robbie Kearns
- Melbourne Storm Rookie of the Year: Ben Roarty
- Clubman of the Year: Robbie Kearns
- Mick Moore Chairman's Award: Chris Anderson
- Hit of the Year: Marcus Bai

=== Dally M Awards Night ===
Held at Fox Studios Australia on Thursday, 27 August.

- Dally M Coach of the Year: Chris Anderson
- Dally M Winger of the Year: Marcus Bai
- Dally M Lock of the Year: Tawera Nikau

=== Additional Awards ===
- Rugby League Annual – Players of the Year: Marcus Bai
- Rugby League Annual – Team of the Year: Marcus Bai (Wing)
