= 1999 Melbourne Storm season =

- 1999 NRL premiers
- NRL Rank: 3rd
- Play-off result: Premiers
- 1999 record: Wins: 16; draws: 0; losses: 8
- Points scored: For: 639; against: 392

Team information
- Executive Director: John Ribot
- Coach: Chris Anderson
- Captain: Glenn Lazarus (26 matches) Tawera Nikau (2 matches)
- Stadium: Olympic Park Stadium
- Avg. attendance: 12,902 (Note: Regular season home matches in Melbourne only)
- High attendance: 16,473 (Round 9) (Note: Regular season home matches in Melbourne only)

Top scorers
- Tries: Matt Geyer (20), Robbie Ross (20)
- Goals: Matt Geyer (81)
- Points: Matt Geyer (242)
← 1998	List of seasons	2000 →

The 1999 Melbourne Storm season was the second in the club's history. Coached by Chris Anderson and captained by Glenn Lazarus, they competed in the National Rugby League's 1999 season, finishing the regular season in 3rd out of 17 teams. Melbourne reached the 1999 NRL Grand Final and defeated the St George Illawarra Dragons, claiming their first premiership.

Stability in playing talent and continued off-field support from Melbourne's core supporters, produced a continued improvement in 1999. Injury took away Scott Hill and Robbie Kearns for much of the season. Melbourne's fullback Robbie Ross, winger Matt Geyer and front-row forwards Rodney Howe and Glenn Lazarus were all selected to play for New South Wales in the 1999 State of Origin series.

In their final home game at Olympic Park, the Storm lost to the North Sydney Bears and having had a bye in the last round and they had no opportunity to lift their form before fronting the St. George Illawarra Dragons in their first final. The Storm ultimately lost this game to the Dragons by 34-10 and looked set for a repeat of the 1998 exit.

Despite lacking confidence, Melbourne Storm outlasted the Canterbury Bulldogs by 24–22 to reach the preliminary final against Parramatta Eels. The Eels had let a place in the Grand Final slip out of their grasp in the same match in 1998, and were tipped to be much hungrier for a win than the Storm. Parramatta took a hold on the match, but the Storm did not relent and thanks to some last-ditch tackling stayed in the game. A late try to the Storm saw them win by 18-16 and secure a re-match against the Dragons for the title.

The Storm had lost twice to the Dragons already in 1999 and by the time Melbourne was behind by 0–14 at half time, it was more than apparent that St. George – Illawarra were going to take the premiership in their first ever season. There was nothing in the Storm's performance to indicate that a comeback was possible.

But Melbourne Storm recovered from their poor start with inspiring efforts from Paul Marquet, Brett Kimmorley and Tawera Nikau. Into the final minutes of the game the Dragons led 18-14 but were forced to drop out from their own line. On the fifth tackle Kimmorley kicked high into the Dragons' corner. As the Storm's winger Craig Smith caught the ball over the try-line he was knocked unconscious in a head-high tackle by Jamie Ainscough and lost the ball.

Referee Bill Harrigan deferred to the video referee and the replay clearly showed that if not for the illegal tackle Smith would have scored a try. A penalty try was awarded giving the Storm's Matt Geyer a conversion from in front of the posts to take Melbourne Storm to a 20–18 lead and the title.

== Season summary ==
- 12 February – Melbourne open their season with a trial match against the Auckland Warriors at Brisbane's Lang Park. Using their entire squad, the Storm had led 14–4, before a spirited fourth quarter comeback lifted the Warriors to a 16–14 win in front of 5,000 fans.
- 14 February – Despite their successes in 1998, Melbourne were not quoted among the favourites among bookmakers to win the 1999 premiership, with NSW SportsTAB spokesperson Wayne Cross saying: "I reckon they over-achieved last season and will find the going harder in 1999. They've got some good players but a couple of injuries and they'll crash right out of contention." Melbourne were quoted by bookmakers at the start of the season as 12/1 chances to win the premiership.
- 20 February – Melbourne then made their second trip to Albury to take on the Canberra Raiders in front of over 7,000 fans. The Storm finished strongly to win 24–18, after trailing 14–8 at half time. The club again courted controversy and a potential fine of A$10,000 with suspended forward Rodney Howe seen on the sideline and carrying drinks onto the field.
- 25 February – Melbourne were fined A$10,000 for the second time in a week for allowing suspended forward Rodney Howe to be on the player's bench during the trial match against the Raiders in Albury. The first fine also related to Howe sitting on the bench during a match during the 1998 season following Howe's 22-match suspension for taking performance enhancing drugs. Storm coach Chris Anderson later saying: "It is time the persecution of Rodney Howe stopped. Howe has been fined by the club and the NRL. He has been made an example of and humiliated at every level. As far as I'm concerned he is part of the club and, for the sake of his rehabilitation, it is important he knows that."
- Round 1 – Melbourne open the 1999 NRL season, winning the first game of the season 32–10. Matt Geyer scored the first try of the season in front of 12,056 fans at Olympic Park. Big-name signing Stephen Kearney made his debut for the club in the match, setting up a number of attacking moves.
- Round 2 – Former Melbourne winger John Carlaw scored a try against the club in Balmain Tigers 16–6 victory. Carlaw said he "just wanted to prove a point." Melbourne had two tries disallowed in the defeat, with the Storm attack unable to break the Tigers defence.
- 16 March – It was reported that Melbourne Storm officials were considering legal action against broadcaster Alan Jones who had claimed on his 2UE radio show that players were "fairly inebriated" on the Friday evening before the match against Balmain. Jones later apologised to Melbourne Storm CEO Chris Johns, with the club not pursuing the matter further.
- Round 3 – Storm thrash Brisbane Broncos 48–6 to inflict (what was then) Brisbane's heaviest defeat in their history. It was Melbourne's first win against the Broncos, after losing both matches during the 1998 season. During the second half, Aaron Moule became the first Melbourne player to be sent to the sin bin.
- 22 March – Melbourne coach Chris Anderson was appointed Kangaroos coach.
- 23 March – At the NRL Judiciary, Stephen Kearney was suspended for five matches for a grade one dangerous throw charge from an incident in the match against the Broncos, the suspension also ruling him out of the 1999 Anzac Test.
- Round 4 – Melbourne run the risk of censure from the NRL after introducing "Skirt Man" to the Olympic Park crowd before the game against Canterbury-Bankstown Bulldogs. Storm CEO Chris Johns claimed the NRL Judiciary's decision to suspend Stephen Kearney for five matches would see players "all wearing skirts". Melbourne were behind 17–10 with less than 20 minutes remaining in the match, scoring three late tries to seal a 26–17 win.
- 29 March – The NRL take no further action against the Storm for the "Skirt Man" stunt.
- 31 March – NRL Judiciary chairman Justice Greg Woods rejected Melbourne's appeal against Stephen Kearney's five match suspension after the club presented additional video replays.
- Round 5 – An out of sorts Melbourne had their winning streak snapped by the Cronulla Sharks in a 20–16 loss at Olympic Park. The Sharks defence holding out the Storm late in the match, with Robbie Kearns held up over the line with seven minutes remaining.
- Round 6 – In his first game back following a 22-match suspension for steroid use, Rodney Howe is charged with a grade two careless high tackle in a tackle that broke the jaw of Auckland Warriors hooker Jason Death. Howe was later suspended for one match. Melbourne won the match 38–10 against the Warriors, for their first win in New Zealand.
- Round 8 – Matt Geyer sets a new club record for points in a game with 24 (two tries, eight goals) against South Sydney Rabbitohs, eclipsing Craig Smith's mark of 18 points against Western Suburbs Magpies.Geyer had practised his goalkicking with former Socceroos forward Scott Ollerenshaw in the leadup to the match after landing only three of ten attempts at goal during the last two matches. Melbourne won the match 52–6, scoring nine tries in the match.
- Round 9 – Robbie Ross scored two tries as Melbourne defeated the Brisbane Broncos for the second time in the season, taking a 28–18 win that kept the reigning premiers on the foot of the NRL ladder. The crowd of 16,473 was the highest announced crowd at Olympic Park for the season, with a tribute to the recently retired Allan Langer featuring at halftime.
- Round 10 – In the club's first ever game in Western Australia, Melbourne thrash Western Suburbs Magpies 62–6 at Lathlain Park. Matt Geyer sets two new club records – most points in a game (34); tries in a game (four). He also equalled Craig Smith's club record nine goals in a game. Geyer's 34 points was the sixth highest individual scoring effort in league history.
- 18 May – Robbie Kearns is thrown from a horse during a NSW Blues Origin "bonding camp" in the Megalong Valley organised by coach Wayne Pearce. Kearns suffers a broken collarbone, and is ruled out of action for months. Melbourne coach Chris Anderson later blasts Pearce in his newspaper column: "As far as I'm concerned, any coach who puts blokes on horses mid-season, let alone before an important representative clash, is off their rocker."
- Round 13 – Melbourne lose to joint venture club St George Illawarra Dragons in the first meeting between the clubs. Backing up after the first State of Origin match, captain Glenn Lazarus blamed himself for the loss, apologising for three errors with the ball. Scores were level at 12–all at half time, Melbourne unable to contain the Dragons after the break.
- Round 14 – Missing three players due to State of Origin selection, Melbourne lose 26–6 to the Canberra Raiders. The Storm fell behind early in chilly conditions, looking out of sorts and sluggish while lacking discipline.
- 8 June – Scott Hill undergoes surgery on a shoulder injury ruling him out for the rest of the season, while club officials call for State of Origin players to be released back to their clubs on the weekend before any dead rubber games.
- Round 15 – Melbourne lose three matches in a row for the first time, losing by one point to the Andrew Johns inspired Newcastle Knights in an entertaining match. The halfback scored a try and kicked the winning field goal in a 27–26 result.
- 17 June – Paul Rauhihi is released from his contract with Melbourne to sign with Newcastle Knights. Rauhihi never played a first grade game for Melbourne.
- Round 16 – The Storm snap a three-match losing streak with a gritty 26–8 win over the Sydney City Roosters at Olympic Park. Brett Kimmorley and Tawera Nikau both having strong matches, while teenage fullback Brad Watts was brought into the team to make his NRL debut.
- 23 June – Chairman John Ribot confirms Melbourne has been investigating a possible move to the under construction Docklands Stadium in 2000.
- Round 17 – Stephen Kearney was reported again for a high tackle on Terry Hill in Melbourne's 19–18 win against Manly at Brookvale Oval. Brett Kimmorley scored two tries and the winning field goal three minutes from fulltime.Coach Chris Anderson praising Kimmorley as among the "best five or six players" in the world.
- 29 June – Melbourne endure a double blow at the NRL Judiciary with prop forward Rodney Howe suspended for two matches for striking and Stephen Kearney receiving a one match suspension for his high tackle on Terry Hill. The Storm successfully arguing for a reduction in the grading of the Kearney tackle from grade two to grade one.
- Round 18 – In wet conditions at Olympic Park, Parramatta blew out Melbourne in the first half to lead 18–0 to score the most points in the first half against the Storm. Robbie Ross scored a late consolation try in the 20–6 loss. Brett O'Farrell made his debut for the Storm in the match.
- 6 July – The NSWRL tell Melbourne that under no circumstances will they pay compensation to Robbie Kearns for the horse riding accident.
- Round 19 – In Melbourne's first visit to Stadium Australia, the team bounced back from their loss to Parramatta to beat the Bulldogs 24–14. Aaron Moule scored a double, while Brad Watts almost scored two tries himself, his second try denied by the video referee.
- Round 20 – A 30–10 win over the Raiders entrenched the Storm in the top eight and put them on track for a potential home final. Playing off the bench, Brad Watts scored two tries in the win after Marcus Bai had opened the scoring, latching onto a cross-field kick from Ben Anderson.
- 19 July – Tony Martin suffers serious facial injuries after a cycling accident. Martin would end up missing three matches from the incident for which he required plastic surgery and extensive dental work. Martin later admitting "it's scary to think what would have happened had I not been wearing a helmet."
- 20 July – Brad Watts signed a two-year contract extension with the club, the 19-year-old becoming the first player to be signed past the end of the 2000 season.
- Round 21 – Melbourne inflict Cronulla-Sutherland Sharks first home defeat of the season, winning 26–18 in windy conditions. Steve Kearney scored two tries and set up another for Robbie Ross in the 26–18 victory. Melbourne holding off the Sharks after taking a 16–2 half time lead.
- 28 July – Melbourne captain Glenn Lazarus announces he will retire at the end of the 1999 season to take up a coaching role with Canberra Raiders.
- Round 22 – Leading 16–2 at halftime, Melbourne hold on for a 16–14 win against the Auckland Warriors at Olympic Park, a take from Matt Geyer in the final minutes that forced Warriors winger Nigel Vagana into touch a key moment. Warriors halfback Matthew Ridge was sent off during the match for tripping Geyer earlier in the match.
- 3 August – New Zealand international hooker Richard Swain extended his contract with the club for another three years.
- 5 August – Storm lodge an official claim for compensation with the ARL on behalf of Robbie Kearns for income lost due to the horse riding accident.
- 6 August – Melbourne lose front-row forward Wayne Evans for the remainder of the season with the 24-year-old suffering from two bulging discs in his back which had him in considerable pain.
- Round 23 – Melbourne moved into second place on the NRL ladder following a 30–24 win against the North Queensland Cowboys. The Storm were in front 20–8 at halftime and 30–14 before the Cowboys scored two late tries. An angry Chris Anderson was quoted post-match "we can't afford to drop off when we are leading, the good sides just don't do that. At 20–0 we should have gone on with it. We dropped the ball, slipped off tackles, took bad options and generally went to sleep."
- 14 August – Scott Hill suffers serious head injuries after being assaulted outside a nightclub on the NSW north coast. A 22-year-old woman was later charged with assault for using a steel fence post to hit Hill.
- Round 24 – Melbourne win their sixth straight match to set a new club record, winning the final home match of the season 44–14 against Western Suburbs, in what was the final meeting between the teams before the Magpies merger with Balmain Tigers to form the Wests Tigers. In his 250th game, Glenn Lazarus kicked the only goal of his first grade career, converting a late try in his farewell to the Olympic Park crowd.
- 18 August – Two Melbourne Storm cheerleaders were sacked by the company who organised the group for dating players. Sophia Triantafillou, the cheer squad's choreographer saying "all the girls understood that if they did conduct relationships with the players, their services would no longer be required."
- Round 25 – North Sydney Bears upset Melbourne 20–24 at North Sydney Oval in was the Bears last ever NRL match at the venue. As a result, Melbourne end the season third on the NRL ladder. Before the match, Robbie Kearns failed a fitness test on a thigh injury which had also kept him out of the round 24 match. Kearns would eventually miss the rest of the season with the injury, despite extensive treatment through September.
- 29 August – Halfback Brett Kimmorley ends speculation he was leaving the club by signing a new two-year contract to stay in Melbourne.
- 2 September – At the Dally M Awards, Brett Kimmorley finished fourth with 25 points, six points behind winner Andrew Johns for the Dally M Medal.
- Qualifying Final – Sixth-placed St. George Illawarra Dragons upset Melbourne 34–10 at Olympic Park in the first week of the 1999 NRL finals, with Nathan Blacklock scoring a hat trick for the visitors. In poor weather, 15,653 people were at Olympic Park for the match, with Chris Anderson saying after the match "whatever we did didn't pan out. Why, I don't know. Whether we wanted it too much I don't know. We were in a good frame of mind. I'm at a loss to explain why we played that bad."
- 8 September – Chris Johns announced that Melbourne had extended the contract of forward Matt Rua for a further three seasons.

It's time to stop talking and just do it. This is our season, we don't want it to end here. Personally, I didn't want to end on that sort of a note. I'd like to go another week, possibly two. I think we were a little bit embarrassed into playing like we did today. To play like we did [last week] at Olympic Park was atrocious.

— Glenn Lazarus, following the semi final against the Bulldogs
- Semi Final – Melbourne advance to the preliminary finals with a tight 24–22 win over Canterbury-Bankstown Bulldogs at the Sydney Football Stadium, with Matt Geyer scoring the winning try after replacing Ben Anderson who had been dropped after the loss to St. George Illawarra. Geyer ran 90 metres to score after picking up a kick from Bulldogs playmaker Ricky Stuart. Craig Smith returned for his first match of the year, converting three tries and kicking a penalty goal in the match.
- Preliminary Final – Coming from 6–16 down midway through the second half, Melbourne stun Parramatta Eels to win 18–16 to progress to the 1999 NRL Grand Final. Melbourne hit the lead with 15 minutes left in the match, with neither team able to score in a frenetic finish. Glenn Lazarus saying in the post match "The faces of the young blokes say it all. They are jubilant. It is a fantastic effort, but there is still one more big game to go."Melbourne scored three tries from the boot of Brett Kimmorley — two from grubber kicks and one from a high kick that caused a knock-on from the Parramatta defence. Victorian viewers are left angry as extended coverage of the 1999 Victorian state election results delays live television coverage of the game on GTV-9.
- 21 September – Stephen Kearney is cleared to play in the Grand Final by the NRL Judiciary, despite NRL Commissioner Jim Hall saying Kearney had "established contact" with the head of Parramatta's Jason Smith's head and neck during the Preliminary Final. Hall was quoted as saying: "I cannot prove there was deliberate contact, and a striking charge must be deliberate."
- 22 September – Melbourne name an unchanged team for the Grand Final, with the injured Robbie Kearns and youngster Brad Watts named as the travelling reserves. In a bid to prove his fitness in recovering from a torn quadriceps muscle, Kearns admitted "if I was to play, it would break someone's heart in taking his spot, so I will really have to weigh things up before making a final decision." Three Storm players — Robbie Ross (corked thigh), Craig Smith (shoulder and knee) and Ben Roarty (shoulder) all spent time in recovery in the week leading up to the Grand Final, missing some training sessions, but made it through to take their places in the team.
- 23 September – At the annual Grand Final breakfast, both teams faced off at the Westin Hotel in Sydney. Meanwhile, Robbie Kearns ruled himself out of the Grand Final team, making the call to sit out of the match due to his persistent thigh injury. The Dragons were installed as favourites with the bookmakers, Melbourne given a 5.5 points start on FootyTAB, with the head-to-head odds of $1.45 for the Dragons and the Storm at $2.55.

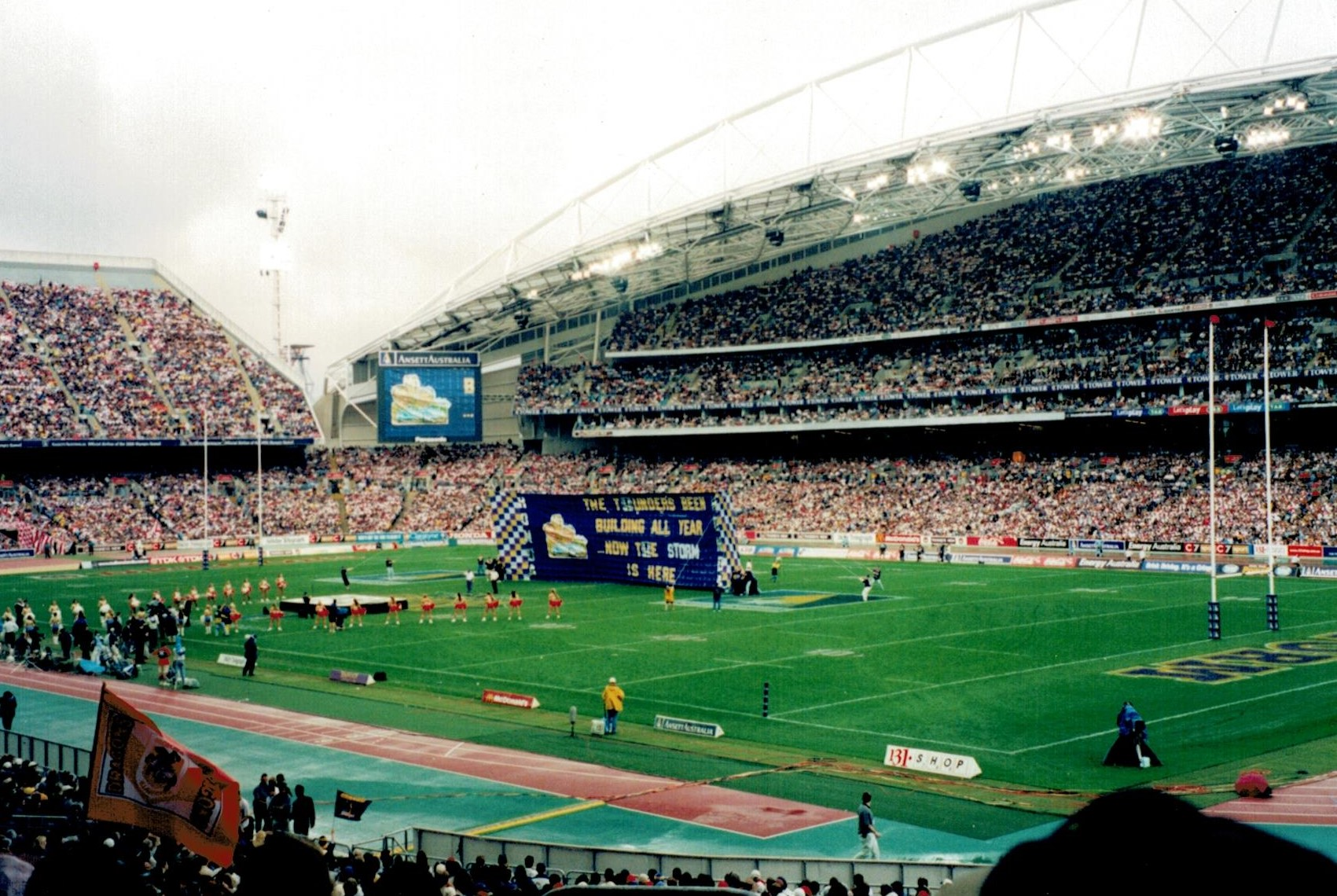
Stadium Australia before the 1999 NRL Grand Final

- Grand Final – In front of a rugby league world record crowd of 107,999, Melbourne Storm staged a comeback 20–18 victory over St. George Illawarra Dragons to win the club's first premiership in just their second season. A penalty try to winger Craig Smith awarded by referee Bill Harrigan and video referee Chris Ward decides the outcome. Smith was concussed in the tackle, leaving Matt Geyer to kick the goal to give the Storm the lead. Melbourne had fallen behind by 14 points, failing to score in the first half. Second half tries to Tony Martin and Ben Roarty brought the Storm back into the contest. Brett Kimmorley was awarded the Clive Churchill Medal, with Tawera Nikau unlucky not to receive the award, which was voted on by the ARL Kangaroos selectors. Danny Williams celebrated his 100th match in the win. In his final match before retirement, Glenn Lazarus won his fifth Grand Final, saying on the television broadcast "this is just unbelievable. I mean, 14–0 down at half-time, it wasn't looking too good mate. But, ahh... this is meant to be." Thousands of fans greeted the team back to Melbourne after turning Olympic Park into a celebration party. The club had hosted a "grand final village" at Gosch's Paddock for fans to watch the match.

Melbourne have won it! Melbourne have won the Grand Final! A sporting miracle. Melbourne... from 14–nil have won the Grand Final 20 points to 18.

— Commentator Ray Warren at fulltime in the Grand Final
- 4 October – Tawera Nikau signs a two-year contract with Warrington Wolves, while Craig Smith rejects Melbourne's offer to stay with the club.
- 19 October – Ben Anderson is released by the club. Anderson was told of the club's decision by CEO Chris Johns while Chris Anderson was on international duty with the Kangaroos, angering the premiership coach.
- 11 November – It's announced that Melbourne will take on Super League champions St Helens in the return of the World Club Challenge at Wigan on Saturday, 22 January 2000.
- 30 November – The club is awarded the Team of the Year (national competition) at the Australian Sport Awards.

=== Milestone games ===
Round	Player	Milestone
Round 1	Stephen Kearney	Storm debut
Round 1	Scott Hill	50th game
Round 5	Marcus Bai	50th game
Round 7	Brett Kimmorley	50th game
Round 10	Richard Swain	50th game
Round 11	Aseri Laing	Storm debut
Round 13	Tasesa Lavea	NRL debut
Round 15	Tawera Nikau	100th game
Round 16	Brad Watts	NRL debut
Round 18	Brett O'Farrell	NRL debut
Round 22	Robbie Kearns	150th game
Round 23	Russell Bawden	50th game
Round 24	Melbourne Storm	50th game
Round 25	Glenn Lazarus	250th game
Grand Final	Danny Williams	100th game

=== Jerseys ===
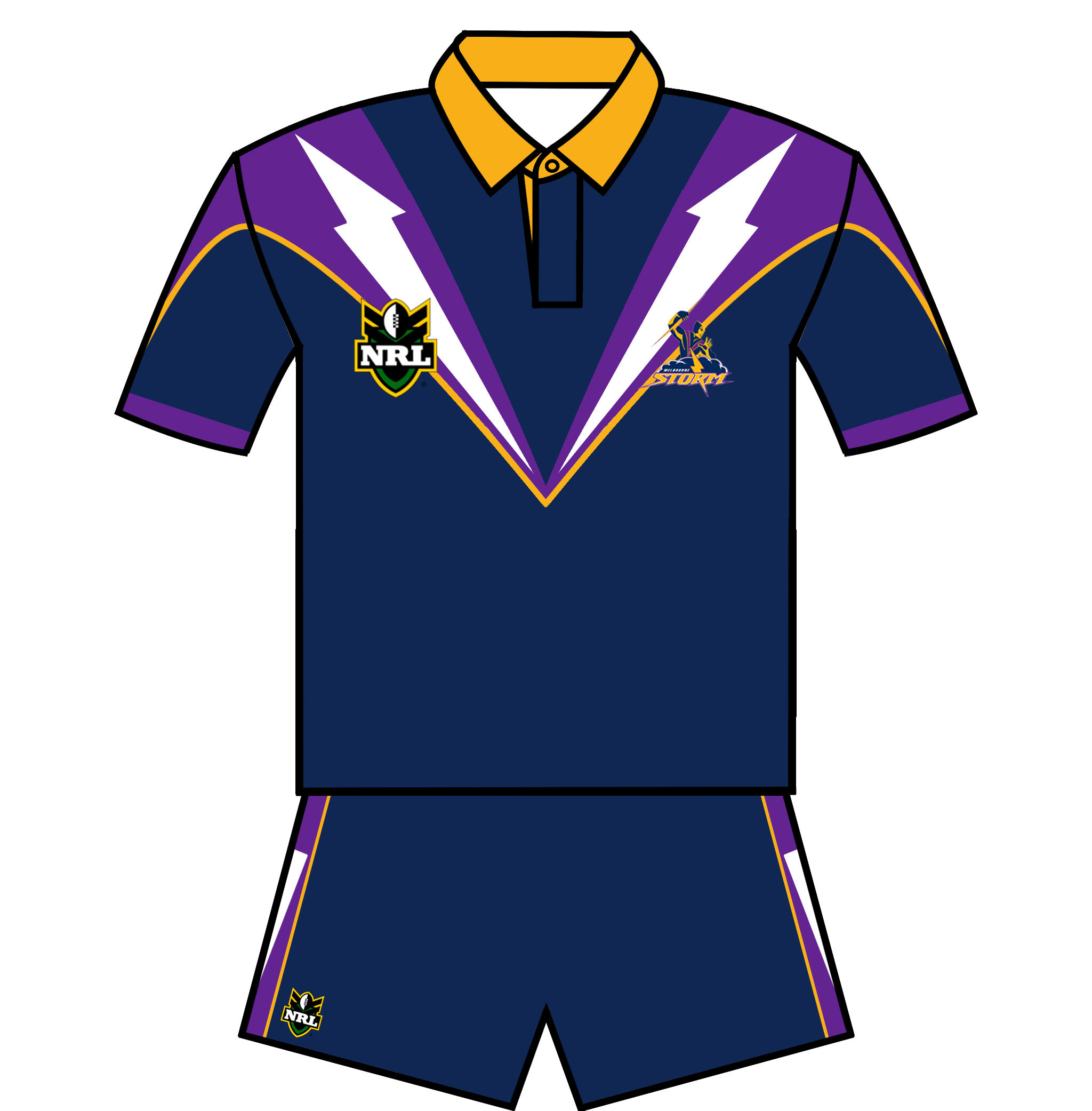
1999 home jersey

During the 1998 season, Melbourne struck an apparel sponsorship agreement with Fila to manufacture and merchandise a range of club apparel. The home jersey was redesigned, maintaining the same colours as the 1998 version, but with white thunderbolts in a purple chevron. The gold trim and collars remained, and Honda continued with their sleeve advertisement.

A striking gold jersey was also designed as the club's clash colours; with that jersey worn in rounds 10, 15 and 23.

== Fixtures ==
=== Pre season ===
Date	Rd	Opponent	Venue	Result	Mel.	Opp.	Tries	Goals	Field goals	Ref
12 February	Trial	Auckland Warriors	Lang Park, Brisbane	Lost	14	16	C Smith, R Ross, S Hill	C Smith 1/3		
20 February	Trial	Canberra Raiders	Lavington Sports Ground, Albury	Won	24	18	S Kearney (2), C Smith, M Bai, S Hill	C Smith, B Kimmorley		

=== Regular season ===
==== Result by round ====
Round	1	2	3	4	5	6	7	8	9	10	11	12	13	14	15	16	17	18	19	20	21	22	23	24	25	26
Ground	H	A	A	H	H	A	A	H	H	A	H	–	H	A	A	H	A	H	A	H	A	H	A	H	A	–
Result	W	L	W	W	L	W	L	W	W	W	W	B	L	L	L	W	W	L	W	W	W	W	W	W	L	B
Position	3	7	4	3	6	5	5	4	4	4	3	3	3	4	6	5	4	7	6	6	5	4	3	2	4	3
Points	2	2	4	6	6	8	8	10	12	14	16	18	18	18	18	20	22	22	24	26	28	30	32	34	34	36

Source: Rugby League Tables
A = Away; H = Home; N = Neutral; B = Bye; W = Win; D = Draw; L = Loss

==== Matches ====
Date	Rd	Opponent	Venue	Result	Mel.	Opp.	Tries	Goals	Field goals	Ref
5 March	1	Penrith Panthers	Olympic Park, Melbourne	Won	32	10	R Bawden, M Geyer, A Moule, R Ross, R Swain	M Geyer 6/9		
13 March	2	Balmain Tigers	Leichhardt Oval, Sydney	Lost	6	16	P Bell	M Geyer 1/3		
21 March	3	Brisbane Broncos	ANZ Stadium, Brisbane	Won	48	6	R Ross (2), P Bell, W Evans, S Hill, B Kimmorley, T Martin, T Nikau	M Geyer 8/9		
26 March	4	Canterbury-Bankstown Bulldogs	Olympic Park, Melbourne	Won	26	17	M Bai (2), S Hill, R Kearns, B Kimmorley	M Geyer 3/6		
4 April	5	Cronulla-Sutherland Sharks	Olympic Park, Melbourne	Lost	16	20	S Hill, P Marquet, B Roarty	M Geyer 2/3		
9 April	6	Auckland Warriors	Ericsson Stadium, Auckland	Won	38	10	M Bai (2), P Bell (2), M Geyer (2), R Kearns, B Roarty	M Geyer 2/7, B Kimmorley 1/1		
17 April	7	Parramatta Eels	Parramatta Stadium, Sydney	Lost	14	26	M Bai, M Geyer, S Hill	M Geyer 1/3		
24 April	8	South Sydney Rabbitohs	Olympic Park, Melbourne	Won	52	16	M Bai (2), M Geyer (2), R Bawden, B Kimmorley, T Martin, B Roarty, R Ross	M Geyer 8/10		
2 May	9	Brisbane Broncos	Olympic Park, Melbourne	Won	28	18	R Ross (2), S Hill, M Rua, D Williams	M Geyer 4/6		
8 May	10	Western Suburbs Magpies	Lathlain Park, Perth	Won	62	6	M Geyer (4), R Ross (3), R Bawden, B Kimmorley, T Martin, A Moule	M Geyer 9/13		
15 May	11	Manly Warringah Sea Eagles	Olympic Park, Melbourne	Won	28	6	R Ross (2), M Geyer, T Nikau, R Swain	M Geyer 4/5		
21 May	12	Bye								
28 May	13	St George Illawarra Dragons	Olympic Park, Melbourne	Lost	16	28	R Ross (2), M Geyer	M Geyer 2/3		
4 June	14	Canberra Raiders	Bruce Stadium, Canberra	Lost	6	26	A Laing	B Kimmorley 1/2		
12 June	15	Newcastle Knights	Marathon Stadium, Newcastle	Lost	26	27	M Geyer (2), M Bai, T Martin, T Nikau	M Geyer 3/5		
18 June	16	Sydney City Roosters	Olympic Park, Melbourne	Won	26	8	S Kearney, T Martin, A Moule, T Nikau, M Rua	B Kimmorley 3/6		
27 June	17	Manly Warringah Sea Eagles	Brookvale Oval, Sydney	Won	19	18	B Kimmorley (2), B Roarty	M Geyer 3/5	B Kimmorley	
2 July	18	Parramatta Eels	Olympic Park, Melbourne	Lost	6	20	R Ross	M Geyer 1/1		
10 July	19	Canterbury-Bankstown Bulldogs	Stadium Australia, Sydney	Won	20	24	A Moule (2), M Bai, M Geyer, B Watts	M Geyer 2/6		
16 July	20	Canberra Raiders	Olympic Park, Melbourne	Won	30	10	B Watts (2), M Bai, T Martin, R Ross	M Geyer 5/7		
25 July	21	Cronulla-Sutherland Sharks	Shark Park, Sydney	Won	26	18	S Kearney (2), B Anderson, M Geyer, R Ross	M Geyer 3/5		
1 August	22	Auckland Warriors	Olympic Park, Melbourne	Won	16	14	M Geyer, P Marquet, A Moule	M Geyer 2/3		
7 August	23	North Queensland Cowboys	Dairy Farmers Stadium, Townsville	Won	30	24	M Bai, R Bawden, P Bell, B Kimmorley, R Ross, M Rua	M Geyer 3/7		
15 August	24	Western Suburbs Magpies	Olympic Park, Melbourne	Won	44	14	M Rua (2), R Howe, B Kimmorley, G Lazarus, T Martin, R Ross, B Watts	M Geyer 5/7, G Lazarus 1/1		
22 August	25	North Sydney Bears	North Sydney Oval, Sydney	Lost	20	24	R Bawden, M Geyer, A Moule, R Ross	M Geyer 2/5		
28 August	26	Bye								

=== Finals ===
Qualifying final

Saturday, 4 September
14:30 AEST (UTC+10)

Melbourne Storm	10 – 34	St. George Illawarra Dragons
Tries: 2 Moule 20'; Kearney 48'; Goals: 1 Geyer 48' (1/3)	1st: 4–10; 2nd: 6–24; Report	Tries: 6 Blacklock 63', 70', 78'; McGregor 15'; Wishart 27'; Ainscough 43'; Goals: 5 Bartrim 15', 43', 70', 78' (4/4); Mackay 63' (1/2)

Olympic Park, Melbourne
Attendance: 15,653
Referee: Bill Harrigan

Semi final

Sunday, 12 September
14:30 AEST (UTC+10)

Melbourne Storm	24 – 22	Canterbury Bulldogs
Tries: 4 Geyer 29', 69'; Bai 3'; Ross 13'; Goals: 4 Smith 14', 30', pen 39', 70' (4/5)	1st: 18–12; 2nd: 6–10; Report	Tries: 4 Silva 7'; El Masri 24'; S Hughes 55'; Sherwin 61'; Goals: 3 Halligan 8', 24', 62' (3/4)

Sydney Football Stadium, Sydney
Attendance: 20,075
Referee: Steve Clark

Preliminary final

Saturday, 18 September
19:30 AEST (UTC+10)

Parramatta Eels	16 – 18	Melbourne Storm
Tries: 2 Wagon 10'; Kelly 37'; Goals: 4 Schifcofske pen 7', 11', pen 32', 38' (4/5)	1st: 16–6; 2nd: 0–12; Report	Tries: 3 Kimmorley 22'; Moule 55'; Swain 63'; Goals: 3 Smith 23', 56', 64' (3/3)

Sydney Football Stadium, Sydney
Attendance: 27,555
Referee: Bill Harrigan

1999 NRL Grand Final

Sunday, 26 September
15:00 AEST (UTC+10)

Melbourne Storm	20–18	St. George-Illawarra Dragons
Tries: 3 Martin 53'; Roarty 57'; Smith (penalty) 75'; Goals: 4 Smith pen 42', 59', pen 64' (3/4); Geyer 77' (1/1)	1st: 0–14; 2nd: 20–4; Report	Tries: 3 Fitzgibbon 13'; Blacklock 29'; McGregor 56'; Goals: 3 Bartrim 15', 31' (2/3); Fitzgibbon pen 23' (1/1)

Stadium Australia, Sydney
Attendance: 107,999
Referee: Bill Harrigan
Video referee: Chris Ward
Touch judges: Colin White, John McCormack
Clive Churchill Medal: Brett Kimmorley (Melbourne)

== Ladder ==
1999 NRL season
Pos	Team	Pld	W	D	L	B	PF	PA	PD	Pts
1	Cronulla-Sutherland Sharks	24	18	0	6	2	586	332	+254	40
2	Parramatta Eels	24	17	0	7	2	500	294	+206	38
3	Melbourne Storm (P)	24	16	0	8	2	639	392	+247	36
4	Sydney City Roosters	24	16	0	8	2	592	377	+215	36
5	Canterbury-Bankstown Bulldogs	24	15	1	8	2	520	462	+58	35
6	St. George Illawarra Dragons	24	15	0	9	2	588	416	+172	34
7	Newcastle Knights	24	14	1	9	2	575	484	+91	33
8	Brisbane Broncos	24	13	2	9	2	510	368	+142	32
9	Canberra Raiders	24	13	1	10	2	618	439	+179	31
10	Penrith Panthers	24	11	1	12	2	492	428	+64	27
11	Auckland Warriors	24	10	0	14	2	538	498	+40	24
12	South Sydney Rabbitohs	24	10	0	14	2	349	556	-207	24
13	Manly Warringah Sea Eagles	24	9	1	14	2	454	623	-169	23
14	North Sydney Bears	24	8	0	16	2	490	642	-152	20
15	Balmain Tigers	24	8	0	16	2	345	636	-291	20
16	North Queensland Cowboys	24	4	1	19	2	398	588	-190	13
17	Western Suburbs Magpies	24	3	0	21	2	285	944	-659	10

== 1999 Coaching Staff ==
- Head coach: Chris Anderson
- Assistant coaches: Greg Brentnall & Steve Anderson
- Football Manager: Michael Moore
- Head physiotherapist: Tony Ayoub
- Head Trainer: Steve Litvensky
- Trainer: Aaron Salisbury

== 1999 squad ==
List current as of 27 July 2021

Cap (Note: Players are listed with the cap number as they appear on the Melbourne Storm honour board. Additional squad members do not have a cap number.)	Nat.	Player name	Position	First Storm Game	Previous First Grade RL club (Note: This column denotes the previous RL club the player was signed to and played first grade RL for. If they are yet to debut then this is stipulated. If they were merely signed to the club but did not play then it is not counted.)
1	(Australia)	Robbie Ross	FB	1998	(Australia) Hunter Mariners
2	(Australia)	Craig Smith	WG	1998	(Australia) Canterbury-Bankstown Bulldogs (Note: Reserve grade 1997, previous first grade experience with North Sydney Bears in 1994)
3	(Australia)	Aaron Moule	WG, CE	1998	(Australia) South Queensland Crushers
4	(Australia)	Paul Bell	CE	1998	(Australia) Perth Reds
5	(Papua New Guinea)	Marcus Bai	WG	1998	(Australia) Gold Coast Chargers
6	(Australia)	Scott Hill	FE	1998	(Australia) Hunter Mariners
7	(Australia)	Brett Kimmorley	HB	1998	(Australia) Hunter Mariners
8	(Australia)	Rodney Howe	PR	1998	(Australia) Perth Reds
9	(Australia)	Danny Williams	LK, SR, HK	1998	(Australia) North Sydney Bears
10	(Australia)	Robbie Kearns	PR	1998	(Australia) Perth Reds
11	(Australia)	Paul Marquet	PR, SR	1998	(Australia) Hunter Mariners
12	(Australia)	Ben Roarty	PR, SR, LK	1998	(Australia) Melbourne Storm
13	(New Zealand)	Tawera Nikau	LK	1998	(Australia) Cronulla Sharks
14	(Australia)	Glenn Lazarus	PR	1998	(Australia) Brisbane Broncos
15	(New Zealand)	Richard Swain	HK	1998	(Australia) Hunter Mariners
16	(Australia)	Russell Bawden	PR	1998	(Australia) Brisbane Broncos
18	(Australia)	Matt Geyer	WG	1998	(Australia) Perth Reds
19	(Australia)	Wayne Evans	SR	1998	(Australia) Perth Reds
20	(Australia)	Ben Anderson	FE	1998	(Australia) Melbourne Storm
21	(Australia)	Tony Martin	WG, CE	1998	(England) London Broncos
23	(Australia)	Wade Fenton	SR, PR	1998	(Australia) Melbourne Storm
24	(Papua New Guinea)	John Wilshere	CE	1998	(Australia) Perth Reds
25	(Australia)	Daniel Frame	PR, SR	1998	(Australia) Melbourne Storm
26	(New Zealand)	Matt Rua	PR, SR	1998	(Australia) Melbourne Storm
28	(New Zealand)	Stephen Kearney	SR	1999	(New Zealand) Auckland Warriors
29	(Fiji)	Aseri Laing	WG	1999	(Australia) Western Suburbs Magpies
30	(New Zealand)	Tasesa Lavea	FE	1999	(Australia) Melbourne Storm
31	(Australia)	Brad Watts	FB	1999	(Australia) Melbourne Storm
32	(Australia)	Brett O'Farrell	PR	1999	(Australia) Melbourne Storm
—N/a	(New Zealand)	Tai Lavea	FB	Yet to debut	(Australia) Melbourne Storm
—N/a	(New Zealand)	Paul Rauhihi	PR	Yet to debut	(Australia) Melbourne Storm (Note: Released mid-season)
—N/a	(Australia)	Peter Robinson	SR	Yet to debut	(Australia) Melbourne Storm

== Player movements ==
Losses

- John Carlaw to Balmain Tigers
- Paul Rauhihi to Newcastle Knights
- John Wilshere to Released

Gains

- Stephen Kearney from Auckland Warriors
- Aseri Laing from Western Suburbs Magpies
- Tasesa Lavea from Junior All Blacks
- Tai Lavea from Junior All Blacks
- Peter Robinson from Cobar Roosters

== 1999 Premiership Team ==
Melbourne Storm
1999 Premiership Team	Interchange	Coach
1 Robbie Ross – FB; 2 Craig Smith – WG; 3 Aaron Moule – CE; 4 Tony Martin – CE; 5 Marcus Bai – WG; 6 Matt Geyer – FE; 7 Brett Kimmorley – HB; 8 Glenn Lazarus (c) – PR; 9 Richard Swain – HK; 10 Rodney Howe – PR; 11 Stephen Kearney – SR; 12 Paul Marquet – SR; 13 Tawera Nikau – LK	14 Matt Rua; 15 Russell Bawden; 16 Ben Roarty; 17 Danny Williams	Head coach: Chris Anderson; Legend: (c) Captain(s); (vc) Vice-captain(s)

== Representative honours ==
This table lists all players who have played a representative match in 1999.

Player	1999 ANZAC Test	State of Origin 1	State of Origin 2	State of Origin 3	1999 Tri-Nations
Matt Geyer	—N/a	New South Wales	New South Wales	New South Wales	—N/a
Rodney Howe	—N/a	New South Wales	New South Wales	New South Wales	Australia
Glenn Lazarus	Australia	New South Wales	—N/a	—N/a	—N/a
Stephen Kearney	—N/a	—N/a	—N/a	—N/a	New Zealand
Robbie Kearns	Australia	—N/a	—N/a	—N/a	Australia
Brett Kimmorley	—N/a	—N/a	—N/a	—N/a	Australia
Robbie Ross	—N/a	New South Wales	New South Wales	New South Wales	Australia
Matt Rua	—N/a	—N/a	—N/a	—N/a	New Zealand
Richard Swain	—N/a	—N/a	—N/a	—N/a	New Zealand

== Statistics ==
This table contains playing statistics for all Melbourne Storm players to have played in the 1999 NRL season.

- Statistics sources:

Name	Appearances	Tries	Goals	Field goals	Points
Ben Anderson	13	1	0	0	4
Marcus Bai	28	12	0	0	48
Russell Bawden	27	5	0	0	20
Paul Bell	14	5	0	0	20
Wayne Evans	12	1	0	0	4
Matt Geyer	26	20	81	0	242
Scott Hill	12	5	0	0	20
Rodney Howe	17	1	0	0	4
Stephen Kearney	22	4	0	0	16
Robbie Kearns	13	2	0	0	8
Brett Kimmorley	28	9	5	1	47
Aseri Laing	5	1	0	0	4
Tasesa Lavea	1	0	0	0	0
Glenn Lazarus	26	1	1	0	6
Paul Marquet	28	2	0	0	8
Tony Martin	25	8	0	0	32
Aaron Moule	25	9	0	0	36
Tawera Nikau	26	4	0	0	16
Brett O'Farrell	1	0	0	0	0
Ben Roarty	22	5	0	0	20
Robbie Ross	25	20	0	0	80
Matt Rua	26	5	0	0	20
Craig Smith	3	1	10	0	24
Richard Swain	28	3	0	0	12
Brad Watts	9	4	0	0	16
Danny Williams	14	1	0	0	4
26 players used	—	129	97	1	711

=== Scorers ===
Most points in a game: 34 points (Note: New club record)

- Round 10 – Matt Geyer (4 tries, 9 Goals) vs Western Suburbs Magpies

Most tries in a game: 4

- Round 10 – Matt Geyer vs Western Suburbs Magpies

=== Winning games ===
Highest score in a winning game: 62 points

- Round 10 vs Western Suburbs Magpies

Lowest score in a winning game: 16 points

- Round 22 vs Auckland Warriors

Greatest winning margin: 54 points

- Round 10 vs Western Suburbs Magpies

Greatest number of games won consecutively: 6

- Round 19 – Round 24

=== Losing games ===
Highest score in a losing game: 26 points

- Round 15 vs Newcastle Knights

Lowest score in a losing game: 6 points

- Round 2 vs Balmain Tigers
- Round 14 vs Canberra Raiders
- Round 18 vs Parramatta Eels

Greatest losing margin: 24 points

- Qualifying Final vs St George Illawarra Dragons

Greatest number of games lost consecutively: 3

- Round 13 – Round 15

=== NRL Judiciary ===
A number of Melbourne players were cited by the match review committee for incidents through the 1999 season, with the following results from the NRL Judiciary.

Round	Player	Offence & grade	Result (Note: 100 demerit points equals one match suspension.)	Ref
Round 3	Stephen Kearney	Dangerous throw (grade 1)	5 matches (515 demerit points)	
Round 4	Tawera Nikau	Careless high tackle (grade 3)	2 matches (251 demerit points)	
Round 5	Wayne Evans	Careless high tackle (grade 2)	No matches (93 demerit points)	
Round 6	Rodney Howe	Careless high tackle (grade 2)	1 match (140 demerit points)	
Round 17	Stephen Kearney	Careless high tackle (grade 2) (Note: Successfully downgraded to grade 1.)	1 match (141 demerit points)	
Round 17	Rodney Howe	Striking (grade 2)	2 matches (204 demerit points)	
Round 22	Stephen Kearney	Contrary conduct (grade 1)	Not guilty	

== Feeder team ==
Melbourne Storm reserve players again travelled to Brisbane each week to play with Queensland Cup team Norths Devils. Backing up the successful 1998 season by finishing second on the ladder, Norths Devils fell one game short of the 1999 Queensland Cup Grand Final, losing to eventual runners-up Redcliffe Dolphins in the Preliminary Final. Kevin Carmichael won his second straight player of the year award, in a tie with Matt Bickerstaff.

In February it was reported that the club were lobbying the New South Wales Rugby League (NSWRL) for approval to establish a sister club for Melbourne to populate a team in the NSWRL junior representatives competitions. Melbourne had been talking to several clubs, including Cabramatta, who would be renamed the Cabramatta Storm if the arrangement was approved.

1999 Queensland Cup
Pos	Team	Pld	W	D	L	PF	PA	PD	Pts
2	Norths Devils	22	17	0	5	791	393	+398	34

== Awards and honours ==
=== Trophy Cabinet ===
- 1999 Provan-Summons Trophy
- Australian Sport Awards Team of the Year (National)

=== Melbourne Storm Awards Night ===
Held on Friday, 1 October:

- Melbourne Storm Player of the Year: Brett Kimmorley
- Melbourne Storm Rookie of the Year: Matt Rua
- Melbourne Storm Members' Player of Year: Brett Kimmorley
- Melbourne Storm Clubman of the Year: Paul Marquet
- Mick Moore Chairman's Award: Glenn Lazarus

=== Dally M Awards Night ===
Held at Horden Pavilion on Thursday, 2 September:

- Dally M Top Pointscorer: Matt Geyer

=== Additional Awards ===
- Clive Churchill Medal: Brett Kimmorley
- Rugby League Annual – Players of the Year: Brett Kimmorley
- Rugby League Annual – Team of the Year: Glenn Lazarus (Prop)
- Rugby League Annual – Team of the Year: Stephen Kearney (Second-row)
- 2UE Player of the Year: Brett Kimmorley
