= 1998 Queensland Cup =

- Duration: March 14 – September 19, 1998
- Teams: 16
- Premiers: Norths Devils (1st title)
- Minor premiers: Norths Devils (1st title)
- Matches played: 185
- Points scored: 9,184
- Top points scorer: John Wilshere (276)
- Player of the year: Shane Perry
- Top try-scorer: George Wilson (27)

The 1998 Queensland Cup season was the 3rd season of top-level statewide rugby league competition in Queensland, Australia.

The competition was contested by sixteen teams over a 27-week long season (including finals), with the Norths Devils defeating the Wests Panthers 35–16 in the Grand Final at Suncorp Stadium. Logan halfback Shane Perry was named the competition's Player of the Year.

== Teams ==
The competition returned to a 16-team format in 1998 with the Bundaberg Grizzlies returning to the competition after a year's absence and the admission of the Townsville Stingers and Gold Coast Vikings. The Port Moresby Vipers withdrew after two seasons in the competition after they were unable to continue to pay their travel and accommodation costs. Also in 1998, the Pine Rivers Brothers played as the Brisbane Brothers, while the Logan City Scorpions became the Logan Scorpions.

In 1998, a number of NRL clubs partnered with Queensland Cup sides, sending players not selected in first grade to play in the competition. The Brisbane Broncos were affiliated with Brisbane Brothers, the Gold Coast Chargers with the Gold Coast Vikings, the Melbourne Storm with the Norths Devils, the North Queensland Cowboys with the Townsville Stingers and the Adelaide Rams with the Wests Panthers.

Colours	Club	Home ground(s)
	Brisbane Brothers	Crosby Park
	Bundaberg Grizzlies	Salter Oval
	Burleigh Bears	Pizzey Park
	Cairns Cyclones	Barlow Park
	Central Capras	Browne Park
	Easts Tigers	Langlands Park
	Gold Coast Vikings	Carrara Stadium
	Ipswich Jets	North Ipswich Reserve
	Logan Scorpions	Meakin Park
	Norths Devils	Bishop Park
	Redcliffe Dolphins	Dolphin Oval
	Souths Magpies	Davies Park
	Toowoomba Clydesdales	Athletic Oval
	Townsville Stingers	Malanda Stadium
	Wests Panthers	Purtell Park
	Wynnum Seagulls	Kougari Oval

== Results ==
In 1998, the Queensland Cup became a full 22-round competition, unlike the previous two seasons which had 17 and 18 regular season rounds.

== Ladder ==
1998 Queensland Cup
Pos	Team	Pld	W	D	L	PF	PA	PD	Pts
1	Norths Devils (P)	22	16	1	5	872	394	+478	33
2	Brisbane Brothers	22	16	0	6	731	364	+367	32
3	Wests Panthers	22	16	0	6	748	408	+340	32
4	Redcliffe Dolphins	22	16	0	6	647	314	+333	32
5	Gold Coast Vikings	22	15	0	7	673	423	+250	30
6	Wynnum Seagulls	22	15	0	7	531	382	+149	30
7	Townsville Stingers	22	13	3	6	686	435	+251	29
8	Burleigh Bears	22	14	0	8	604	442	+162	28
9	Easts Tigers	22	12	1	9	522	497	+25	25
10	Cairns Cyclones	22	8	2	12	500	642	-142	18
11	Central Capras	22	8	0	14	497	701	-204	16
12	Logan Scorpions	22	6	1	15	488	694	-206	13
13	Ipswich Jets	22	6	0	16	350	606	-256	12
14	Souths Magpies	22	6	0	16	381	763	-382	12
15	Toowoomba Clydesdales	22	5	0	17	310	755	-445	10
16	Bundaberg Grizzlies	22	0	0	22	286	1006	-720	0

== Finals series ==
Home	Score	Away	Match Information
Home	Score	Away	Date	Venue
Week 1 Semi-finals
Gold Coast Vikings	30 – 10	Wynnum Seagulls	22 August 1998	Carrara Stadium
Wests Panthers	10 – 20	Redcliffe Dolphins	22 August 1998	Purtell Park
Norths Devils	28 – 10	Brisbane Brothers	23 August 1998	Kougari Oval
Week 2 Semi-finals
Wests Panthers	18 – 16	Gold Coast Vikings	29 August 1998	Pizzey Park
Brisbane Brothers	24 – 28	Redcliffe Dolphins	29 August 1998	Purtell Park
Week 3 Semi-finals
Norths Devils	16 – 12	Redcliffe Dolphins	5 September 1998	Dolphin Oval
Brisbane Brothers	16 – 18	Wests Panthers	6 September 1998	Crosby Park
Preliminary Final
Redcliffe Dolphins	14 – 27	Wests Panthers	12 September 1998	Dolphin Oval
Grand Final
Norths Devils	35 – 18	Wests Panthers	19 September 1998	Suncorp Stadium

== Grand Final ==
Sunday, 19 September

Norths Devils	35 – 16	Wests Panthers
Tries: 6 Geyer (3); Bonus; Carmichael; O'Dwyer; Goals: 5 Wilshere (4); Carmichael (1); Field goals: 1 Hamilton	1st: 6–16; 2nd: 29–0; Report	Tries: 3 Twist (2); Maguire; Goals: 2 Devlin (2)

Suncorp Stadium
Attendance: 4,283
Referee: Tony Maksoud

Norths Devils	Position	Wests Panthers
Paul Hubbard	FB	Tony Devlin
Matthew Dux	WG	Mark Maguire
Steven Bell	CE	Shaun Valentine
Matt Geyer	CE	Craig Smith
John Wilshire	WG	Scott Williamson
Craig O'Dwyer	FE	Craig Bowen (c)
Kevin Carmichael (c)	HB	Jason Twist
Anthony Bonus	PR	David Asplin
Dale Williams	HK	Jason Campbell
Wade Fenton	PR	Robert Campbell
Andrew Hamilton	SR	Cameron Roper
Daniel Frame	SR	Alan Wieland
Mark Protheroe	LK	Joel Twohill
Ricky Paul	Bench	David Fuller
Matt Rua	Bench	Peter Liddell
Ryan Gundry	Bench	Sam Faalafi
Tristan Brady-Smith	Bench	David Liddell
Mark Murray	Coach	Wayne Treleaven

Norths, who finished the season as minor premiers, qualified for their first Grand Final after defeating Brothers and Redcliffe in the finals series. Wests, who finished third, had a tougher road to their first Grand Final appearance, losing in Week 1 to Redcliffe. From there, the Panthers won three straight elimination games to qualify for the decider. When the two sides met in the regular season, Norths defeated the Panthers 42–22 in Round 5 at Purtell Park.

=== First half ===
Wests halfback Jason Twist scored the first points of the game after four minutes with a try close the posts. 15 minutes later, Wests added four more points when winger Mark Maguire crossed in the corner. The Panthers added to their tally soon after when Twist crossed for his second, backing up Shaun Valentine who made a break down the field. Trailing 16–0, Norths finally got on the board when centre Matt Geyer scored the first of his three tries.

=== Second half ===
The second half was all Norths, as they ran in 29 unanswered points to secure their maiden premiership. Devils' prop Anthony Bonus crashed over right next to the posts to cut the lead to four, before Geyer scored his second to level the scores. John Wilshire's sideline conversion put Norths in front by two, their first lead of the game coming in the 60th minute. Captain Kevin Carmichael was the next to score for Norths, with second-rower Andrew Hamilton kicking a field goal 10 minutes later to extend Norths' lead to seven. Norths finished with two late tries to Craig O'Dwyer and Geyer to cap a remarkable 19-point win. The 16–0 deficit they overcame is (as of 2019), the biggest comeback in a Queensland Cup Grand Final.

Geyer and Matt Rua would go onto play in the Melbourne Storm's NRL Grand Final win over the St George Illawarra Dragons a year later, while Steven Bell would win an NRL premiership with the Manly Sea Eagles in 2008.

== Player statistics ==
=== Leading try scorers ===
Pos	Player	Team	Tries
1	George Wilson	Redcliffe Dolphins	27
2	Justin Murphy	Brisbane Brothers	26
3	Heath Egglestone	Central Capras	23
4	Chris Walker	Brisbane Brothers	20
5	Ricky Hewinson	Redcliffe Dolphins	18
5	Mark Maguire	Wests Panthers	18

=== Leading point scorers ===
Pos	Player	Team	T	G	FG	Pts
1	John Wilshere	Norths Devils	16	106	-	276
2	Glen Godbee	Gold Coast Vikings	14	59	-	174
3	Tony Devlin	Wests Panthers	4	66	-	148
4	Aaron Durrant	Easts Tigers	6	59	-	142
5	Brian Hamilton	Logan Scorpions	5	57	1	135

== End-of-season awards ==
- Courier Mail Medal: Shane Perry ( Logan Scorpions)
- Rookie of the Year: Jamie Tomlinson ( Redcliffe Dolphins)

== See also ==
- Brisbane Rugby League
- Queensland Cup
- Queensland Rugby League
- Winfield State League
