= Tristan Smith =

Tristan Smith may refer to:

- Tristan Brady-Smith (born 1977), Australian former professional rugby league footballer
- Tristan Smith, a character from the novel The Unusual Life of Tristan Smith

== See also ==
- Tristan Smyth
