= Robbie Ross (rugby league) =

Australia international rugby league footballer

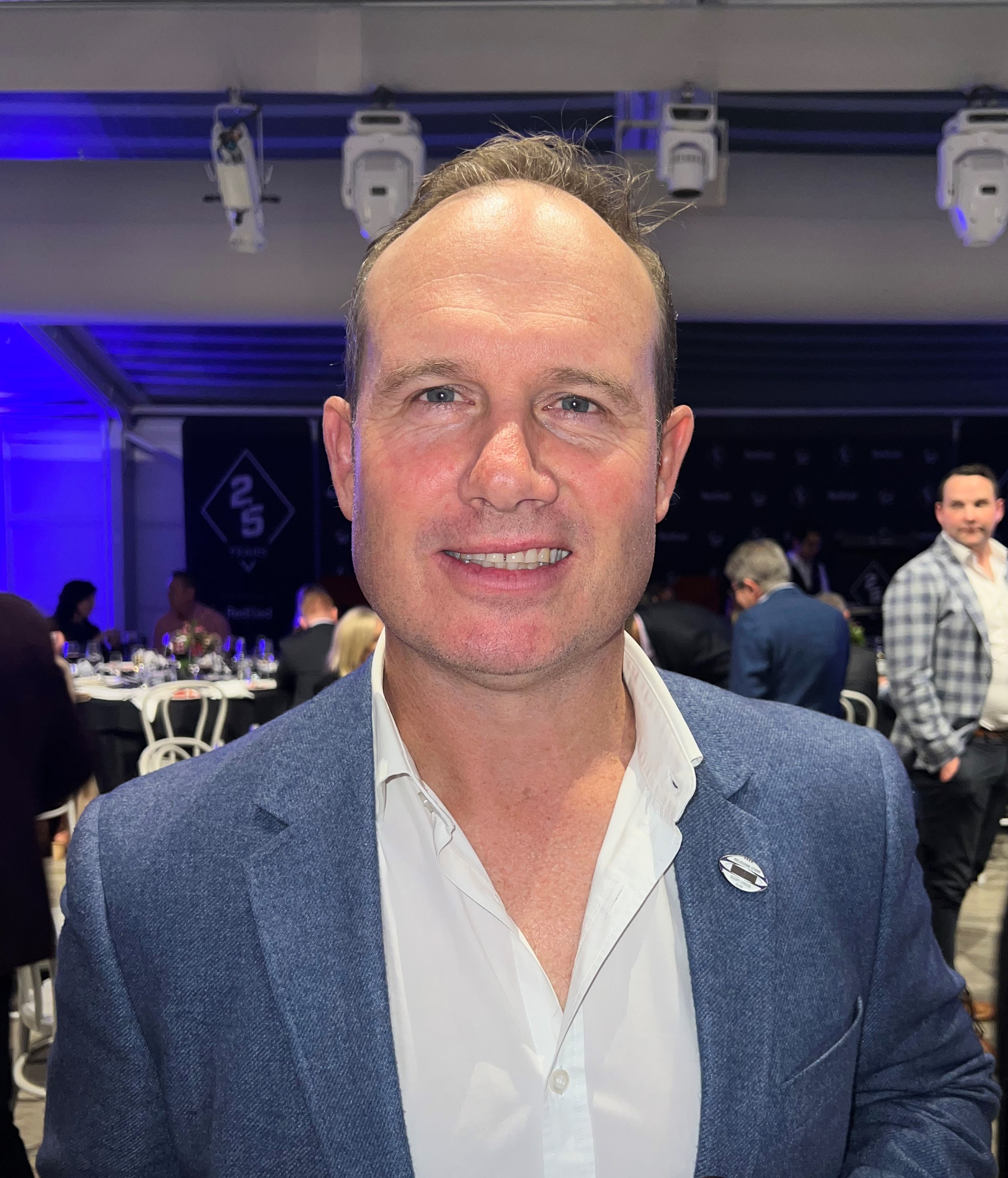
- Ross in 2023

Personal information
- Born: 24 January 1975 (age 51) Griffith, New South Wales, Australia

Playing information
- Height: 182 cm (6 ft 0 in)
- Weight: 84 kg (13 st 3 lb)
- Position: Fullback
Club
Years	Team	Pld	T	G	FG	P
1994–95	Newcastle Knights	20	4	0	0	16
1996	Brisbane Broncos	12	8	0	0	32
1997	Hunter Mariners	16	5	0	0	20
1998–03	Melbourne Storm	89	53	0	0	212
	Total	137	70	0	0	280
Representative
Years	Team	Pld	T	G	FG	P
1997	New South Wales (SL)	2	0	0	0	0
1999	New South Wales	3	1	0	0	4
1999	Australia	1	0	0	0	0

Robbie Ross (born 24 January 1975) is an Australian former rugby league footballer who played in the 1990s and 2000s. An Australian international and New South Wales State of Origin representative fullback, he played his club football with the Newcastle Knights, Brisbane Broncos and Hunter Mariners before settling at the Melbourne Storm with whom he won the 1999 Premiership.

== Early life ==
Born on 24 January 1975 in Griffith, New South Wales. Ross was educated at Swansea High School, where he represented 1992 Australian Schoolboys. Robbie is a local Newcastle Knights junior.

== Playing career ==
Ross forced clubmate Robbie O'Davis onto the wing during the 1995 season. Ross, who signed a Super League contract that year, joined Brisbane while News Ltd fought a battle through the courts to stage its rebel competition.

The potent attacking fullback later honoured his contract with the newly formed Hunter Mariners in 1997. Ross represented New South Wales in the Super League Tri-series competition, but following the demise of the Mariners and the re-unification of the game, quickly secured a contract with another newly formed club, the Melbourne Storm as the first player signed by the club.

A great start to the 1999 season saw Ross chosen for the New South Wales rugby league team. In the second match of 1999 State of Origin series, Ross scored the fastest try in Origin history when Ryan Girdler sent him over in the corner from the second tackle of the match. Later that year, Ross played at fullback for Melbourne in their historic 1999 NRL Grand Final victory and was catapulted into the Australian Test team. After making his debut in the first match of the 1999 Tri-nations series, a 24–22 loss to New Zealand, he was replaced by Darren Lockyer for the remainder of the tournament.

Having won the 1999 premiership, Melbourne Storm contested in the 2000 World Club Challenge against Super League Champions St Helens R.F.C., with Ross playing at fullback and scoring two tries in the victory. Ross started the 2000 NRL season in superlative form. He scored nine tries in 13 matches and retained his position as New South Wales fullback, but was ruled out with a knee injury that was more serious than first thought. He was also awarded the Australian Sports Medal for his contribution to Australia's international standing in rugby league. After being sidelined for the season, Ross returned in 2001 only to be hampered by chronic hamstring trouble. During the 2002 and 2003 seasons, Ross spent lengthy amounts of time on the sidelines with hamstring, knee and back injuries.

He retired just before the start of the 2004 season at only 29 years of age, after it was revealed he had a bulging disc in his back.

== Statistics ==
=== NRL ===
Statistics are correct to the end of career

†	Denotes seasons in which Ross won an NRL Premiership

Season	Team	Matches	T	G	GK %	F/G	Pts	W	L	D	W-L %
1994	Newcastle	8	1	0	—	0	4	2	6	0	25.0
1995	Newcastle	12	3	0	—	0	12	8	4	0	66.7
1996	Brisbane	12	8	0	—	0	32	8	4	0	66.7
1997	Hunter	16	5	0	—	0	20	6	10	0	37.5
1998	Melbourne	21	9	0	—	0	36	13	7	1	64.3
1999†	Melbourne	25	20	0	—	0	80	18	7	0	72.0
2000	Melbourne	13	9	0	—	0	36	7	5	1	57.7
2001	Melbourne	14	6	0	—	0	24	6	7	1	46.4
2002	Melbourne	11	6	0	—	0	24	1	9	1	13.6
2003	Melbourne	5	3	0	—	0	12	2	3	0	40.0
Career totals		137	70	0	—	0	280	71	62	4	53.28

=== State of Origin ===
Season	Team	Matches	T	G	GK %	F/G	Pts	W	L	D	W-L %
1999	New South Wales	3	1	0	—	0	4	1	1	1	50.0
Career totals		3	1	0	—	0	4	1	1	1	50.00

=== Australia ===
Season	Team	Matches	T	G	GK %	F/G	Pts	W	L	D	W-L %
1999	Australia	1	0	0	—	0	0	0	1	0	0.0
Career totals		1	0	0	—	0	0	0	1	0	0.00
