= Craig Smith (rugby league, born 1973) =

Australian rugby league player

Personal information
- Born: 26 February 1973 (age 52) Armidale, New South Wales, Australia

Playing information
- Height: 184 cm (6 ft 0 in)
- Weight: 96 kg (15 st 2 lb)
- Position: Wing
Club
Years	Team	Pld	T	G	FG	P
1995	North Sydney Bears	2	1	0	0	4
1998–99	Melbourne Storm	20	3	61	0	134
	Total	22	4	61	0	138
- Source: Craig Smith at the Rugby League Project

Craig Smith (born 26 February 1973) is an Australian former professional rugby league footballer who played in the 1990s.

== Biography ==
Smith made his first grade rugby league debut for North Sydney Bears in 1995, playing two games late in the season, including the Bears' qualifying final defeat. Joining Canterbury-Bankstown Bulldogs during Super League, Smith scored 20 points in the Bulldogs' 1997 reserve grade premiership win over Auckland Warriors, before signing a two-year contract to play with Melbourne Storm, who entered the NRL in 1998.

Smith was Melbourne Storm's leading point-scorer in the club's debut year (110 points), but had to sit on the sidelines for much of 1999 due to the good form of Matt Geyer. Smith trained in Melbourne, but flew back to Brisbane on weekends to play with the Storm's feeder club, Norths Devils, in the Queensland Cup competition.

Smith was re-instated on the wing before the 1999 semi-final series when coach Chris Anderson dropped his son Ben and moved Geyer to five-eighth. Anderson also made Smith the primary goal-kicker. Smith's boot proved the difference in three sudden-death victories, culminating in his three goals and penalty try from the wing in the 1999 NRL Grand Final, despite playing with knee injuries and a broken rotator cuff in his shoulder.

Smith rejected Melbourne's offer for the 2000 NRL season and retired. After moving to Perth where he lived for many years, he now lives back in Melbourne.

In 2017, Smith spoke about his time in rugby league saying "We were walking around in Melbourne and were three times the size of everyone else, that is how they knew who the rugby league players were back then, nobody knew anything about the sport. At our first game they were cheering and I don’t think they knew what they were cheering about".

== Statistics ==
=== NRL ===
Statistics are correct to the end of career

†	Denotes seasons in which Smith won an NRL Premiership

Season	Team	Matches	T	G	GK %	F/G	Pts	W	L	D	W-L %
1995	North Sydney	2	1	0	0	0	4	0	1	1	0.0
1998	Melbourne	17	2	51	71.8	0	110	11	5	1	67.6
1999†	Melbourne	3	1	10	83.3	0	24	3	0	0	100
Career totals		22	4	61	72.6	0	138	14	6	2	63.64
