= Brett O'Farrell (rugby league) =

Australian rugby league footballer

Personal information
- Born: 20 March 1980 (age 46) Warwick, Queensland, Australia

Playing information
- Height: 186 cm (6 ft 1 in)
- Weight: 104 kg (16 st 5 lb)
- Position: Prop
Club
Years	Team	Pld	T	G	FG	P
1999–01	Melbourne Storm	20	0	0	0	0
2005	Baroudeurs de Pia XIII	3	0	0	0	0
	Total	23	0	0	0	0

Brett O'Farrell (born 23 March 1980) is an Australian former professional rugby league footballer who played in the 1990s and 2000s. He played for the Melbourne Storm in the National Rugby League (NRL) from 1999 to 2001.

== Early life ==
Played junior rugby league with Collegians Dragons before moving to the Warwick Cowboys, representing Queensland schoolboys at the 1997 national carnival.

== Playing career ==
Moving to Brisbane, O'Farrell played with Norths Devils and was a member of the Devils' 1998 Queensland Cup Colts premiership. O'Farrell represented Australia in 1998 and 1999 playing for the Junior Kangaroos against the Junior Kiwis. He also represented Queensland in the under-19s fixture in 1998.

O'Farrell made his NRL debut for Melbourne Storm in round 14 of the 1999 NRL season, playing a total of 20 games for Melbourne.

Suffering a serious ankle injury in round 19 of the 2001 season, O'Farrell was ruled out for the rest of that season. After not agreeing to a new contract with Melbourne at the end of the 2001 NRL season, After attempting to gain a contract with the North Queensland Cowboys, the 22-year-old O'Farrell played reserve grade for the Wests Magpies (2002), and later with the South Sydney Rabbitohs (2004), and Cronulla-Sutherland Sharks (2005), before heading to France to play with the Pia Donkeys.

In 2006 he played some Queensland Cup matches with the Burleigh Bears He would return to France in 2007, but featured again for the Bears from 2008 through the 2010 season.

He was part of a minor controversy in 2008 when he claimed that the Melbourne Storm had been trained on the "chicken wing" and "grapple tackle" techniques under coach Craig Bellamy and wresting consultant coach John Donehue, having spent part of preseason training with the Storm before the start of the 2004 season. O'Farrell claimed that he had been put in a "sleeper hold" from Donehue that left him unconscious as "punishment for skylarking at training."

Following his retirement, O'Farrell was an assistant coach at the Burleigh Bears, and later became a contact and tackle coach and worked with the Gold Coast Titans, New Zealand Warriors, Parramatta Eels, Brisbane Broncos, North Queensland Cowboys, the Australia national rugby union team and Brisbane Lions. He has been trained in Brazilian jiu-jitsu.
