= Tristan Brady-Smith =

Australian rugby league footballer

Personal information
- Full name: Tristan Brady-Smith
- Born: 28 August 1977 (age 48)

Playing information
- Position: Wing, Fullback
Club
| Years | Team | Pld | T | G | FG | P |
|---|---|---|---|---|---|---|
| 1997 | Perth Reds | 7 | 2 | 0 | 0 | 8 |
| 1998 | Melbourne Storm | 3 | 1 | 0 | 0 | 4 |
| | Total | 10 | 3 | 0 | 0 | 12 |
- Source: As of 4 February 2019

Tristan Brady-Smith (born 28 August 1977) is a former professional rugby league footballer who played in the 1990s. He played for the Western Reds in 1997 and the Melbourne Storm in 1998.

== Playing career ==
Brady-Smith made his first grade debut for the Western Reds against Canberra in round 9 of the 1997 Super League season. Brady-Smith went on to play in the club's final ever game which was against the same opponents and ended in a 36–16 loss. Brady-Smith also scored a try in the match.

At the end of 1997, the Super League war was finished and the Western Reds became one of the casualties of the war as they were not included in the reformed NRL competition for 1998 and were liquidated.

In 1998, Brady-Smith signed on with the newly formed Melbourne Storm. Brady-Smith made his debut for the club in round 20 1998 against Newcastle. He would make two further appearances in 1998, starting at fullback and scoring a try against Sydney City Roosters in round 21.

While with Melbourne, he played for the Norths Devils in the Queensland Cup, playing in the Devils 1998 Queensland Cup premiership team.

Brady-Smith was released by Melbourne after the 1999 season, later playing in the Queensland Cup competition with Souths Magpies.

== Statistics ==
=== NRL ===
Statistics are correct to the end of career

| Season | Team | Matches | T | G | GK % | F/G | Pts | W | L | D | W-L % |
|---|---|---|---|---|---|---|---|---|---|---|---|
| 1997 | Perth | 7 | 2 | 0 | — | 0 | 8 | 1 | 6 | 0 | 14.3 |
| 1998 | Melbourne | 3 | 1 | 0 | — | 0 | 4 | 3 | 0 | 0 | 100 |
| Career totals | | 10 | 3 | 0 | — | 0 | 12 | 4 | 6 | 0 | 40.00 |
