= Kevin Carmichael =

Australian rugby league footballer

Personal information
- Born: 30 December 1970 (age 54)

Playing information
- Position: Halfback
Club
Years	Team	Pld	T	G	FG	P
1995–96	South Queensland Crushers	6	0	0	0	0
2000	Melbourne Storm	3	0	0	0	0
	Total	9	0	0	0	0

Coaching information
Representative
Years	Team	Gms	W	D	L	W%
2011	Queensland Residents	1	1	0	0	100
- As of 5 January 2024

Kevin Carmichael (born 30 December 1970), is an Australian former professional rugby league footballer who played in the 1990s and 2000s. He played for the South Queensland Crushers from 1995 to 1996 and then the Melbourne Storm in 2000. Carmichael was Norths Devils player of the year in 1993, 1998–99, and 2001. He was a member of the Norths 1998 Queensland Cup premiership team, scoring a try in the Grand Final win over Wests Panthers.

As of 2010, he was a coach for the Norths Devils, guiding the team to the 2010 Queensland Cup Grand Final, where they lost 30–20 to Northern Pride. In 2019, he was awarded life membership of Norths.
