= Robbie Kearns =

Australia international rugby league footballer

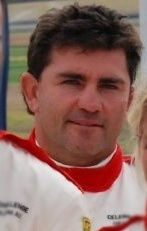

Personal information
- Full name: Robert Kearns
- Born: 12 December 1971 (age 54) Sydney, New South Wales, Australia

Playing information
- Height: 185 cm (6 ft 1 in)
- Weight: 100 kg (15 st 10 lb)
- Position: Prop
Club
Years	Team	Pld	T	G	FG	P
1992–95	Cronulla-Sutherland	76	9	2	0	40
1996–97	Western Reds	37	4	0	0	16
1998–05	Melbourne Storm	169	18	0	0	72
	Total	282	31	2	0	128
Representative
Years	Team	Pld	T	G	FG	P
1998–03	New South Wales	8	0	0	0	0
1998–03	Australia	20	0	0	0	0
2002–03	City NSW	2	0	0	0	0
1997	Australia (SL)	3	1	0	0	4
1997	New South Wales (SL)	1	0	0	0	0

Robbie Kearns (born 12 December 1971) is an Australian former professional rugby league footballer who played in the 1990s, and 2000s. An Australia international and New South Wales State of Origin representative forward, he played for the Cronulla-Sutherland Sharks, Western Reds and the Melbourne Storm.

== Early life ==
Born in Sydney, New South Wales. Kearns was educated at St John Bosco College, Engadine.

Robbie played junior football for the Engadine Dragons and St John Bosco Bulldogs. He then signed with the Cronulla-Sutherland Sharks.

== Playing career ==
In March 1992, Kearns made his first grade debut for Cronulla-Sutherland Sharks in round 1 against the Brisbane Broncos at Lang Park, becoming a regular in the Cronulla side during the 1992 season. He was a member of the Sharks reserve grade premiership victory in 1993.

Kearns signed with the Western Reds for the 1996 ARL season. He would go on to win Player of the Year honours for the Reds in 1996, also taking out the club Chairman's Player of the Year award in both 1996 and 1997.

Selected by New South Wales for the Super League Tri-series final against Queensland during the 1997 Super League season, Kearns would make his international representative debut after he was selected to play for Australia from the interchange bench in all three matches of the Super League Test series against Great Britain.

Kearns signed on with the newly created Melbourne Storm for the 1998 NRL season. That year he was named the club's Player of the Year award, also winning the Chairman's Award. He would also make his State of Origin debut for New South Wales, playing in game 3 of the 1998 State of Origin series. Kearns would be selected again for NSW in 1999, but fell off a horse at a training camp, breaking his collarbone in three places. He would be ruled out of the entire 1999 State of Origin series and would be restricted to only 13 matches for the entire 1999 season, with a thigh injury keeping him out of the Storm team that would go on to win the 1999 NRL Grand Final.

Having won the 1999 Premiership, the Melbourne Storm travelled to England to contest the 2000 World Club Challenge against Super League Champions St Helens R.F.C., with Kearns captaining at prop forward in the victory. In 2000 Kearns was awarded the Australian Sports Medal for his contribution to Australia's international standing in rugby league. Kearns captained the Melbourne Storm from 2000 to 2002 and again in 2005. At the end of the 2001 NRL season, he went on the 2001 Kangaroo tour. He was again named the Storm's player of the season in 2003 and he went on the 2003 Kangaroo tour of Great Britain and France, helping Australia to victory over Great Britain in what would be the last time the two nations contested an Ashes series.

He retired at the conclusion of the 2005 season after a 13-year career, but remained with the Melbourne Storm in a marketing and business development capacity.

Melbourne Storm released a 'team of the decade' as part of their 10-year celebrations in 2007, with Kearns named at prop.

== Representative career ==
- State of Origin: Played 8 games in total for New South Wales between 1998 and 2003
- International: Played 23 tests for Australia including the 2000 World Cup

== Honours ==
- Western/Perth Reds Player of the Year: 1996, 1997
- Melbourne Storm Player of the Year: 1998, 2003
