= Steven Bell =

Australian rugby league footballer

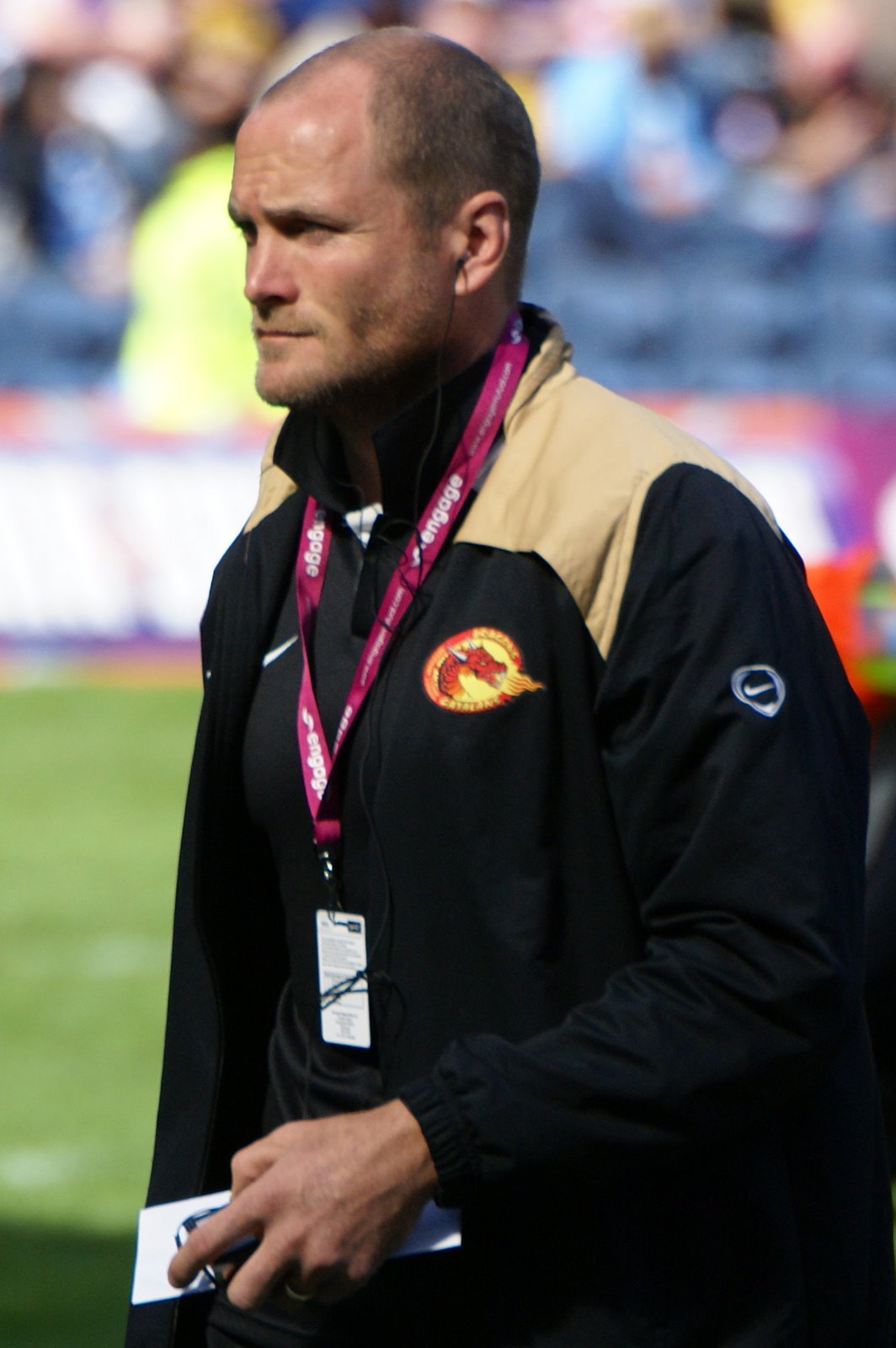

Personal information
- Full name: Steven Bell
- Born: 28 May 1976 (age 50) Rockhampton, Queensland, Australia

Playing information
- Height: 186 cm (6 ft 1 in)
- Weight: 74 kg (11 st 9 lb)
- Position: Centre, Wing
Club
Years	Team	Pld	T	G	FG	P
2001–05	Melbourne Storm	107	63	0	0	252
2006–08	Manly Sea Eagles	65	31	0	0	124
2009–10	Catalans Dragons	49	17	0	0	68
	Total	221	111	0	0	444
Representative
Years	Team	Pld	T	G	FG	P
2006–07	Queensland	5	2	0	0	8

Steven "Steve" Bell (born 28 May 1976) is an Australian former professional rugby league footballer who last played for the Catalans Dragons in the Super League. A Queensland State of Origin representative three-quarter, he previously played club football in the NRL for the Melbourne Storm, then the Manly-Warringah Sea Eagles (with whom he won the 2008 NRL Grand Final).

== Early life ==
Bell was born in Rockhampton, Queensland and was raised in Emerald, Queensland.

He played junior rugby league for Emerald Tigers, winning premierships in under-15s and under-17s. Crossing to Emerald Seagulls, he also represented the Central Queensland side in 1996.

== Playing career ==
=== Early career ===
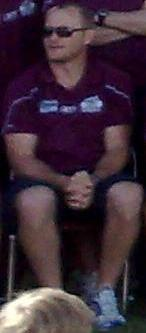
Steven Bell at the celebration of the winning of the 2008 NRL Grand Final

Bell moved to Norths Devils in 1998, playing in the 1998 Queensland Cup Premiership for Norths.

In 2000, he scored a club high 18 tries from 22 games, earning representative selection for the Queensland City and Queensland Residents rugby league team. Bell was named the Norths Player of the Year in 2000 and scored 45 tries for the club in the Queensland Cup.

=== Melbourne Storm 2001-2005 ===
Bell earned a contract with Melbourne Storm for the 2001 season, winning Melbourne's Rookie of the Year Award.

=== Manly-Warringah Sea Eagles 2006-2008 ===
Leaving Melbourne at the end of the 2005 NRL season Bell played 64 first grade games for the Manly-Warringah Sea Eagles, scoring 31 tries. In 2006, he played only 17 out of 26 games for the club as he earned selection for the Queensland rugby league team. Bell was part of the winning Queensland team in the 2007 State of Origin series, scoring the try that won the series.

Bell was on the losing team in the 2007 NRL Grand Final won by his old team Melbourne Storm. A year later, in his last game for Manly, Bell was on the winning side in the 2008 NRL Grand Final defeating Melbourne 40–0.

=== Catalans Dragons 2009-2010 ===
Bell joined French Super League side Catalans Dragons on a two-year contract from the 2009 season.
