= Wade Fenton =

Australian rugby league footballer

Personal information
- Full name: Wade Fenton
- Born: 31 July 1971 (age 55)

Playing information
- Position: Prop, Second-row
Club
Years	Team	Pld	T	G	FG	P
1998–00	Melbourne Storm	5	0	0	0	0

Wade Fenton (born 31 July 1971), is an Australian former professional rugby league footballer who played in the 1990s and 2000s. He played for the Melbourne Storm in 1998 and 2000.

Starting his career at Norths Banyo, Fenton later played for Valleys and Redcliffe.

A rugged prop forward Fenton played 114 games in the Queensland Cup with Norths Devils, and had decided to retire at the end of the 2002 Queensland Cup season after battling injury, but made a comeback during the 2003 season.

He was a member of the Norths Devils 1998 Queensland Cup premiership team.

During his playing career, Fenton dabbled in player management, at one point managing teammate Steven Bell through contract negotiations.
