= Geoff McNamara =

Australian rugby league footballer

Personal information
- Full name: Geoff McNamara
- Born: 27 July 1973 (age 51)

Playing information
- Position: Wing
Club
Years	Team	Pld	T	G	FG	P
1997–98	Canberra	25	8	3	0	38
- Source: As of 30 January 2023

Geoff McNamara is an Australian former professional rugby league footballer who played in the 1990s. He played for Canberra in the Super League/NRL competitions.

== Playing career ==
McNamara made his first grade debut for round 3 of the 1997 Super League season against Canterbury at Belmore Sports Ground. In the 1998 NRL season, McNamara played 19 games as Canberra qualified for the finals. He played in both finals matches against Manly and Melbourne.
