= Andrew Hamilton (rugby league) =

Australian rugby league footballer

Personal information
- Full name: Andrew Hamilton
- Born: 17 October 1971 (age 54) Bundaberg, Queensland, Australia

Playing information
- Position: Lock, Second-row
Club
| Years | Team | Pld | T | G | FG | P |
|---|---|---|---|---|---|---|
| 1997 | South Qld Crushers | 7 | 3 | 0 | 0 | 12 |
| 1997–03 | London Broncos | 30 | 3 | 0 | 0 | 12 |
| | Total | 37 | 6 | 0 | 0 | 24 |

Andrew Hamilton (born 17 October 1971 in Bundaberg, Queensland) is an Australian former professional rugby league footballer who played as a lock and second-row forward in the 1990s and 2000s.

He played for the London Broncos in the Super League and also for the South Queensland Crushers, the Ipswich Jets, the Norths Devils and Queensland Residents in Australia. He played 30 Super League Games and 7 ARL First Grade Games at the top level. He was chosen in the Queensland Cup team of the decade 1995-2005 along with Fans Queensland Cup team of the decade 1995-2005
