= Purtell Park =

Rugby league ground in Bardon, Queensland

- Interactive map of Purtell Park
- Location: Bardon, Queensland
- Coordinates: 27.46410°S 152.97387°E
- Surface: Grass

Tenant
- Wests Brisbane Junior Rugby League Club

Purtell Park is a rugby league ground in Bardon, a suburb in Brisbane's west, in Queensland, Australia. It is now the home of Wests Brisbane Juniors Rugby League Football Club (catering for approximately 300 young players), Voices of Birralee (catering for approximately 400 young singers), Western Districts Gymnastics, and a venue for Premier Touch Football and TRL. A community arts centre which provides meeting rooms for community organisations has been set up in what used to be the football clubhouse.

It was the home ground for the Western Suburbs Panthers, who played in the Queensland Rugby League South East Queensland Division's Mixwell Cup and Mixwell Colts Challenge, and who played in the Queensland Cup until the end of 2003. The venue is now used by the Wests Brisbane Junior Rugby League Club.

== See also ==
- Sport in Queensland
