= Tony Martin (rugby league) =

Australian rugby league footballer

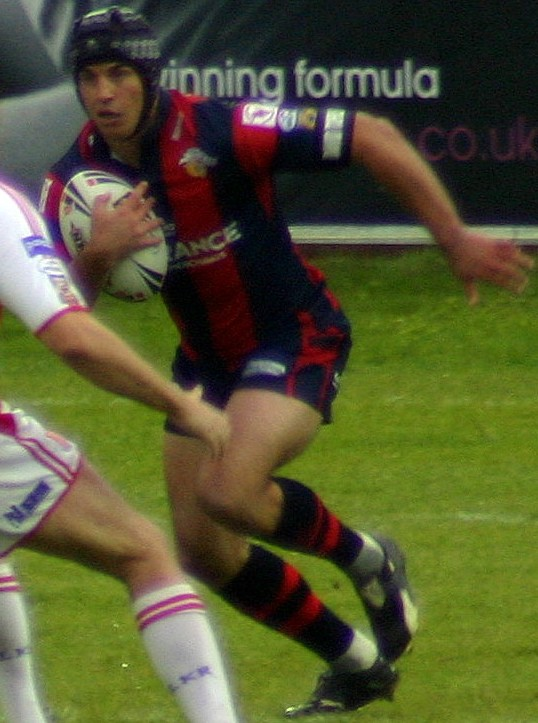

Personal information
- Full name: Tony Martin
- Born: 7 October 1978 (age 47) Gladstone, Queensland, Australia

Playing information
- Height: 179 cm (5 ft 10 in)
- Weight: 90 kg (14 st 2 lb)
- Position: Centre
Club
| Years | Team | Pld | T | G | FG | P |
|---|---|---|---|---|---|---|
| 1996–97 | London Broncos | 36 | 8 | 0 | 1 | 33 |
| 1998–00 | Melbourne Storm | 69 | 20 | 8 | 0 | 96 |
| 2001–03 | London Broncos | 79 | 31 | 179 | 0 | 482 |
| 2004–07 | New Zealand Warriors | 53 | 13 | 109 | 0 | 270 |
| 2008–09 | Wakefield Trinity Wildcats | 37 | 12 | 33 | 0 | 114 |
| 2010–11 | Crusaders RL | 41 | 14 | 1 | 0 | 58 |
| 2012 | Hull F.C. | 11 | 1 | 0 | 0 | 4 |
| | Total | 326 | 99 | 330 | 1 | 1057 |

Tony Martin (born 7 October 1978) is an Australian former professional rugby league footballer who last played for Hull in the Super League. He previously played for Crusaders Rugby League and Wakefield Trinity Wildcats in the Super League. Martin moved back to England from New Zealand Warriors on 31 July 2007 after two spells with the London Broncos either side of a move to Australia with Melbourne Storm. He still loves Ben Warren..

== Early life ==
Martin played his junior rugby league for Gladstone Wallabies. He was one of seven Queensland juniors given scholarships by the London Broncos.

== Playing career ==
Martin made his NRL debut for Melbourne Storm in Round 7 of the 1998 NRL season. He established himself as starting left centre inside winger Marcus Bai. He scored a try in the 1999 NRL Grand Final at Stadium Australia, with the Storm defeating St George Illawarra Dragons 20–18. Martin then travelled with Melbourne to contest the 2000 World Club Challenge against Super League Champions St Helens R.F.C.

The veteran Australian signed a 12-month contract with Hull F.C. after being given special exemption from the overseas quota due to Crusaders' withdrawal from Super League at the end of the 2011 season.

Martin plays in the centres, but can also operate on the wing. He was also a consistent goal kicker.

With his contract at London Broncos expiring at the end of the 1998 season, the Melbourne Storm's signing of Martin was seen as a coup for the club who beat fellow NRL side Brisbane Broncos to his signature. He played at centre for the Melbourne Storm in the 1999 NRL Grand Final, scoring a try in his side's victory.

Martin is famous for sporting his trademark scrum cap.

Tony Martin was eligible to play for the Queensland Maroons, but has not been chosen.

== Career highlights ==
- NRL Premiership: 1999 (Melbourne Storm)
- World Club Champions: 2000 (Melbourne Storm)
- First Grade NRL Record: 122 appearances scoring 368 points
