= Russell Bawden =

Australian rugby league footballer

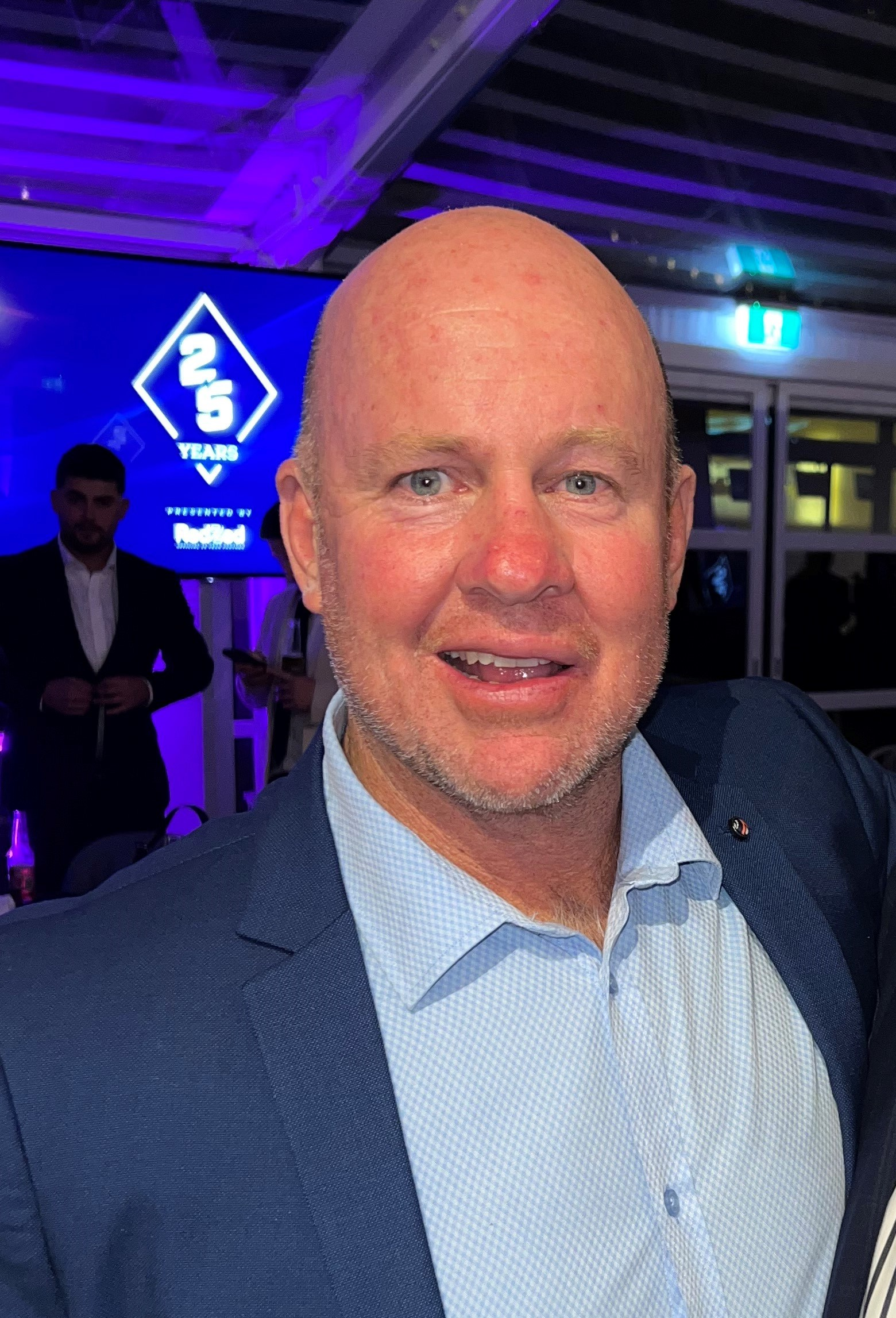
- Bawden in 2023

Personal information
- Born: 24 July 1973 (age 53) Ingham, Queensland, Australia

Playing information
- Height: 183 cm (6 ft 0 in)
- Weight: 104 kg (16 st 5 lb)
- Position: Second-row, Prop
Club
Years	Team	Pld	T	G	FG	P
1994	Brisbane Broncos	2	0	0	0	0
1996–97	London Broncos	4	7	0	0	28
1998–01	Melbourne Storm	101	23	0	0	92
2002–04	London Broncos	58	8	0	0	32
	Total	165	38	0	0	152
Representative
Years	Team	Pld	T	G	FG	P
2000–01	Queensland	3	0	0	0	0

Russell Bawden (born 24 July 1973 in Queensland) is an Australian former professional rugby league footballer who played in the 1990s and 2000s. A Queensland State of Origin representative forward, he played in the National Rugby League for the Brisbane Broncos and Melbourne Storm (with whom he won the 1999 NRL Premiership), as well as in the Super League for the London Broncos.

== Playing career ==
Nicknamed "Rusty," Bawden grew up playing rugby league in Mount Isa, making his first grade debut for Brisbane Broncos in 1994. Failing to crack the Brisbane first grade team, Bawden moved to London Broncos in the 1995-96 off season. He was signed by the newly formed Melbourne side from the London club and helped Melbourne to a premiership in their second ever season, playing from the bench in their 1999 NRL Grand Final victory. The following pre-season he travelled with the Storm to England to play in the 2000 World Club Challenge which they also won. During the 2000 NRL season, while playing for Melbourne, he was selected to make his State of Origin debut for Queensland.

Bawden played three Origin matches across 2000 and 2001, initially selected after going on a self-imposed alcohol ban during the 2000 season.

In 2020, Bawden spoke to NRL.com about his time at Melbourne winning the premiership saying "I wanted it so bad that I swore off the grog for three months – and anyone who knows me knows what a massive sacrifice that was. And my mates didn't help. At the pub, they would dip their fingers in beer and smear it on my lips. I tried not to lick it... not easy. The week itself just goes so quickly, but it was great". Bawden then spoke about his departure from Melbourne saying "Mark Murray took over as coach. He didn't like blokes having a good time – so he and I didn't get on. He dropped me to Brisbane club footy a few weeks after Origin. But he did recall me so I could play my 100th game for the Storm, for which I was very grateful. But after that, he pushed me out".
