= Anthony Bonus =

Australian rugby league footballer

Personal information
- Full name: Anthony Bonus
- Born: Bundaberg, Queensland, Australia

Playing information
- Position: Prop
Club
Years	Team	Pld	T	G	FG	P
1994–95	Illawarra Steelers	4	0	0	0	0
1996	Parramatta Eels	7	0	0	0	0
1998	Melbourne Storm	1	0	0	0	0
	Total	12	0	0	0	0
- Source: As of 18 January 2019

Anthony Bonus is a former rugby league footballer who played in the 1990s. Bonus played for the Illawarra Steelers from 1994–95, then the Parramatta Eels in 1996 and finally the Melbourne Storm in 1998.

== Playing career ==
Originally from Bundaberg, Bonus made his first grade debut for Illawarra in 1994 against Canterbury-Bankstown. In 1996, Bonus joined Parramatta and made seven appearances for the club before being released at the end of the season. He would rejoin Illawarra without adding to his first grade appearances in 1997, playing in the club's second grade team.

In June 1998, Bonus played for Melbourne in the club's inaugural season making one appearance against Balmain. Bonus, who was living in Brisbane, was called into the Storm squad to replace Glenn Lazarus. While with Melbourne, Bonus played for the Norths Devils in the 1998 Queensland Cup, scoring a first half try in the Devils 35–16 win in the Grand Final. He would win the club's best forward award for his efforts across the season.
