= Paul Bell (rugby league) =

Australian rugby league footballer

Personal information
- Born: 14 January 1969 (age 56)

Playing information
- Position: Centre
Club
Years	Team	Pld	T	G	FG	P
1991–94	Cronulla-Sutherland	58	7	0	0	28
1995–96	Western Suburbs	28	6	0	0	24
1997	Western Reds	14	4	0	0	16
1998–99	Melbourne Storm	39	12	0	0	48
2000	Leeds	4	0	0	0	0
	Total	143	29	0	0	116

Paul Bell (born 14 January 1969), is an Australian former professional rugby league footballer who played in the 1990s and 2000s. He played for the Cronulla-Sutherland Sharks from 1991–94, the Western Suburbs Magpies from 1995–96, the Perth Reds in 1997 and finally the Melbourne Storm in 1998-99. After his Australian career finished, he went over to England to play with the Leeds Rhinos in 2000.

== Playing career ==
An Engadine Dragons junior, Bell made his first grade debut for Cronulla-Sutherland in round 5 1991 against Penrith at Penrith Park. Bell spent four years at Cronulla as the club failed to reach the final series. He then spent two years at Western Suburbs. In his final year at the club, Western Suburbs reached the finals and Bell scored a try in their 20-12 elimination final loss against his old club Cronulla at Parramatta Stadium. This was Western Suburbs last finals appearance.

Bell then moved to the Perth Reds, at times deputising as captain for Mark Geyer. Bell played in Perth's last ever season before signing with Melbourne.

Bell played in Melbourne's inaugural game in 1998 against Illawarra at WIN Stadium. Bell played with Melbourne until the end of the 1999 NRL season, but was not included in the grand final winning team. He then spent one season in England with Leeds before retiring.
