= Paul Marquet =

Australian rugby league footballer

Personal information
- Born: 26 September 1969 (age 56) Newcastle, New South Wales, Australia

Playing information
- Height: 180 cm (5 ft 11 in)
- Weight: 92 kg (14 st 7 lb)
- Position: Second-row
Club
Years	Team	Pld	T	G	FG	P
1990–96	Newcastle Knights	110	8	0	0	32
1997	Hunter Mariners	15	3	0	0	12
1998–00	Melbourne Storm	79	9	0	0	36
2001	Newcastle Knights	27	1	0	0	4
2002	Warrington Wolves	26	1	0	0	4
	Total	257	22	0	0	88

Paul Marquet (born 26 September 1969 in Newcastle, New South Wales) is an Australian former professional rugby league footballer who played in the 1990s and 2000s. He played primarily as a second-row for Australian clubs the Newcastle Knights, Hunter Mariners and Melbourne Storm, and for English club, the Warrington Wolves.

== Early life ==
Born in Newcastle, New South Wales. Paul played junior rugby league for Raymond Terrace, New South Wales.

== Playing career ==
A resilient second-row forward, Marquet has the honour of scoring the first try for the Hunter Mariners in their first game of the 1997 Super League season. He would also score the first try for the Melbourne Storm on their first home game of the 1998 NRL season against the North Sydney Bears.

Marquet participated in seven finals series and two NRL Grand Finals, the most memorable being his appearance as a second-row forward for the Melbourne Storm in the 1999 NRL Grand Final, played on his 30th birthday. Having won the 1999 Premiership, the Melbourne Storm traveled to England to contest the 2000 World Club Challenge against Super League Champions St Helens R.F.C., with Marquet again starting as a second-rower in the victory. He played for the Newcastle Knights from the interchange bench in their 2001 NRL Grand Final victory over the Parramatta Eels.

=== Highlights ===
- First Grade Debut:

1990 – Round 1, Newcastle Knights vs North Sydney Bears at EnergyAustralia Stadium, 18 March

- Premierships: (2)

1999 – Melbourne Storm
2001 – Newcastle Knights

- World Club Challenge Champions: (1)

2000 – Melbourne Storm
