= Ben Roarty =

Australian rugby league footballer

Personal information
- Born: 5 February 1975 (age 51) Sydney, New South Wales, Australia

Playing information
- Height: 186 cm (6 ft 1 in)
- Weight: 106 kg (16 st 10 lb)
- Position: Second-row, Prop
Club
Years	Team	Pld	T	G	FG	P
1998–01	Melbourne Storm	94	18	0	0	72
2002–03	Penrith Panthers	32	4	0	0	16
2003–05	Huddersfield Giants	57	10	0	0	40
2006	Castleford Tigers	17	2	0	0	8
	Total	200	34	0	0	136

Ben Roarty (born 5 February 1975) is an Australian former professional rugby league footballer who played in the 1990s and 2000s. He played for the Melbourne Storm, Penrith Panthers, Huddersfield Giants and the Castleford Tigers, as a prop, second-row or lock.

== Early life ==
Started playing rugby league with St Christophers Junior Rugby League Club at age five, later playing junior representative games for Canterbury-Bankstown Bulldogs.

== Playing career ==
Roarty played reserve grade football for Canterbury-Bankstown Bulldogs, winning the reserve grade player of the year in 1996. While with Canterbury, he was a member of Canterbury's reserve grade premiership team, but missed the grand final due to injury.

Signed by Melbourne Storm, Roarty played in their first game on 14 March 1998, winning against Illawarra Steelers, 14–12. That year he was named the club's rookie of the year.

In 1999, Roarty started on the bench in the 1999 NRL Grand Final between Melbourne and St. George Illawarra Dragons. Roarty scored a try in the match and Melbourne won the game, 20–18.

Seeking a regular first-grade starting position, Roarty joined the Penrith Panthers in 2002 but he was again primarily used as an interchange player. After being offered a place at the Huddersfield Giants in the Super League, Penrith granted Roarty a release and he left the Panthers half-way into their 2003 premiership winning season.

In 2007, Roarty became the head coach of the Sunbury United Tigers first-grade team in the Victorian Rugby League competition.

In 2009, Roarty linked up as a player with the Hay Magpies Rugby League Club in Group 20 of the NSW Country Rugby League. He also won a reserve grade premiership with Hay, which was their first ever premiership in any grade since joining Group 20 in 2007.

== Post playing ==
Since 2009, he has owned a strawberry farm north of Echuca.

He is the head of Charity organisation Camp 4 Cancer; the biggest donator of Peter Mac institute.
