= Matt Rua =

New Zealand international rugby league footballer

Personal information
- Full name: Matthew James Rua
- Born: 20 July 1977 (age 49) Auckland, New Zealand

Playing information
- Height: 187 cm (6 ft 2 in)
- Weight: 105 kg (16 st 7 lb; 231 lb)
- Position: Second-row
Club
Years	Team	Pld	T	G	FG	P
1998–02	Melbourne Storm	100	14	0	0	56
2007	Melbourne Storm	1	0	0	0	0
	Total	101	14	0	0	56
Representative
Years	Team	Pld	T	G	FG	P
1999–01	New Zealand	11	2	0	0	8

Matthew Rua (born 20 July 1977) is a New Zealand former professional rugby league footballer who played in the 1990s and 2000s. A New Zealand international representative forward, he played in the National Rugby League for the Melbourne Storm, winning the 1999 NRL Premiership with them.

He attended High School at Kelston Boys High School and Waitākere College.

== Playing career ==
Rua was a Manly-Warringah Sea Eagles junior in 1996 and played for the Junior Kiwis. He never made any first grade appearances for Manly.

Rua signed for the Melbourne Storm in 1998 and played for the Norths Devils in the Queensland Cup. In 1999 he was named the Melbourne club's rookie of the year, playing from the interchange bench in the Storm's 1999 NRL Grand Final victory. Rua was selected for the New Zealand team to compete in the end of season 1999 Rugby League Tri-Nations tournament. In the final against Australia he played at second-row forward in the Kiwis' 22–20 loss.

Having won the 1999 Premiership, the Melbourne Storm traveled to England to contest the 2000 World Club Challenge against Super League Champions St Helens R.F.C., with Rua playing at lock forward in the victory. Rua represented New Zealand eleven times between 1999 and 2001, including the 2000 World Cup. Rua had played 100 games for the club before being released at the end of the 2002 NRL season. He signed with the Canberra Raiders for the 2003 season, but walked out of his contract before the season started for personal reasons. In 2006 he played for the Waitakere Rangers in the Bartercard Cup before being signed by the Central Comets in the Queensland Cup. This was enough to get him signed by the Melbourne Storm in 2007. However he only played one first grade game that season, his first since 2002, in Melbourne's round 13 win over the New Zealand Warriors at Mount Smart Stadium in Auckland. He retired at the end of the year.

Rua is of Cook Islands heritage and has been involved with the Cook Islands national team as a coach.
