= John Wilshere =

Former PNG international rugby league footballer

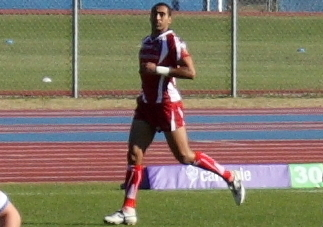

Personal information
- Full name: John Wilshere
- Born: 5 May 1978 (age 48) Port Moresby, Papua New Guinea

Playing information
- Height: 187 cm (6 ft 2 in)
- Weight: 96 kg (15 st 2 lb)
- Position: Fullback, Wing
Club
Years	Team	Pld	T	G	FG	P
1997	Perth Reds	4	1	0	0	4
1998	Melbourne Storm	1	0	3	0	6
2003	St. George Illawarra	10	3	0	0	12
2004	Warrington Wolves	8	5	6	0	32
2005	Leigh Centurions	29	10	8	0	56
2006–09	Salford City Reds	110	51	269	0	742
	Total	162	70	286	0	852
Representative
Years	Team	Pld	T	G	FG	P
1997–09	Papua New Guinea	20	5	60	0	140

John Wilshere (born 5 May 1978) is a Papua New Guinean former professional rugby league footballer who last played for the Salford City Reds.

== Playing career ==
Wilshere made his first grade rugby league debut with the Western Reds during the 1997 Super League season. He scored one try from four appearances with the Reds, before moving to the Melbourne Storm for the 1998 season. He would later spent time at the Penrith Panthers before joining the St George Illawarra Dragons in 2003, where he made 10 NRL appearances.

Wilshere had represented Papua New Guinea many times and was a key player in their squad at the 2008 Rugby League World Cup in Australia.

Wilshere scored 538 points for the Norths Devils in the Queensland Cup.

Wilshere scored 358 points for the Easts Tigers in the Queensland Cup.

Continuing his career in England, Wilshere played with the Warrington Wolves, Leigh Centurions, and Salford City Reds in the Super League competition.

== Representative career ==
Wilshere was captain of the Papua New Guinea national rugby league team for the 2008 Rugby League World Cup. Wilshere was named as part of the Papua New Guinea squad for the 2009 Pacific Cup.

On 7 November 2009, Wilshere announced his retirement from the Kumuls.
