= 2000 Melbourne Storm season =

- NRL Rank: 6th
- Play-off result: Qualifying Final Loss
- 2000 record: Wins: 14; draws: 1; losses: 11
- Points scored: For: 672; against: 529

Team information
- Executive Director: John Ribot
- Coach: Chris Anderson
- Captain: Robbie Kearns (24 matches) Richard Swain (2 matches) Stephen Kearney (1 matches)
- Stadium: Olympic Park Stadium (11 matches); Melbourne Cricket Ground (2 matches)
- Avg. attendance: 14,622 (Note: Regular season home matches in Melbourne only)
- High attendance: 23,239 (Round 5) (Note: Regular season home matches in Melbourne only)

Top scorers
- Tries: Matt Geyer (14)
- Goals: Tasesa Lavea (81)
- Points: Tasesa Lavea (190)
← 1999	List of seasons	2001 →

The 2000 Melbourne Storm season was the third in the club's history. They competed in the NRL's 2000 Premiership and finished the regular season in sixth place, being eliminated in the first week of the finals.

The Storm began 2000 with an easy win over St. Helens in the World Club Challenge. It was a great start for Melbourne, but overall the 2000 season was a disappointment. Major injuries to Marcus Bai and Robbie Ross, along with a lengthy suspension to Stephen Kearney, seriously disrupted the season.

It was made worse when the club was forced to negotiate its way through the trials and tribulations of 12 players coming off contract by the end of the year. Most distracting was the contractual saga of Brett Kimmorley as he travelled between Melbourne, Sydney and Brisbane in search of his future (much to the bewilderment of the Victorian public who were not used to rugby league's mid-season mayhem).

With respectable home crowds averaging over 14,000 the Storm finished the 2000 season in sixth place, earning themselves a semi-final against the Newcastle Knights in Newcastle. However, the defending premiers exited with a 30–16 loss on a wet and miserable afternoon. The season's undoubted highlight was the grand final rematch against the Dragons at the MCG where the Storm won by an incredible scoreline of 70–10.

Summing up the season, Robbie Ross admitted "as players you get to the stage where you win a grand final, and you start to get a little bit cocky. We got found out a little bit in areas where guys probably thought they were a little bit better than the way they had been playing and had to pull their heads in a little bit. There was a lot of controversy over Brett (Kimmorley) leaving and all the players going, and also over the death of (football manager) Mick Moore earlier in the year. We had a lot of outside contributors that didn't do us favors. The year before it was all smooth sailing. Now we've dealt with a bit of difficulty and we can learn from that."

Tony Martin (to London) and Brett Kimmorley (to Northern Eagles) were key losses for the club in the lead up to 2001 which were slightly off-set by the arrival of half-back Matt Orford and winger Junior Langi.

== Season summary ==
- Preseason – 1999 NRL Grand Final winger Craig Smith announces his retirement. When the season draw was announced, it was revealed that Melbourne were denied access to the new Colonial Stadium to play their first home match of the season in round 5, a rematch against the St George Illawarra Dragons. The match is eventually scheduled to be played at the Melbourne Cricket Ground after an offer had been made to host the match at Stadium Australia, the site of the 1999 Grand Final. New recruit Setariki Rakabula was injured in a cycling accident during the preseason, injurying his collar bone and elbow during a team bike ride. The club signed former North Queensland Cowboys forward John Lomax on a one-year contract as a replacement for the retired Glenn Lazarus.
- 14 January – In the club's only trial match before heading to England for the World Club Challenge, an inexperienced Melbourne team lost 36–18 against the Brisbane Broncos at Toowoomba. Both Scott Hill and Robbie Kearns returned from injury in the match, played in front of over 6,000 fans.
- 21 January – Melbourne appoint Robbie Kearns as club captain, following the retirement of inaugural captain Glenn Lazarus and the departure of vice-captain Tawera Nikau. Kearns quoted as saying "I am just the guy who gets the 'c' next to my name in the program, but it is something I am honored to have."
- World Club Challenge – Melbourne thrash St Helens 44–6 in frigid conditions. Robbie Kearns captains the team, while Dane Morgan scores a try in his first official game for the club. Halfback Brett Kimmorley wins the man of the match award. Melbourne led 20–2 at half time, with Robbie Ross and Scott Hill each scoring their second tries of the match in the second half. St Helens player Tommy Martyn lodged a complaint that he had been eye gouged in a tackle by Danny Williams and Morgan, but neither player was subsequently charged. Despite the scoreline, St Helens coach Ellery Hanley insisted Melbourne "were no better than us at all. They didn't do anything spectacular to beat us. We let ourselves down with our defence." Melbourne coach Chris Anderson was happy with the result, but said "I would have liked a harder hitout. I was after something a little more competitive. But our blokes were great tonight."
- 3 February – The NRL fine Melbourne A$30,000 for a minor breach of the league's salary cap, with CEO Chris Johns saying after the NRL's audit "we had probably one of the most thorough investigations I have ever seen. We were a smidgen over, but we are still talking to them at the moment to clarify a few issues. We still think we might be able to squeeze under the cap if they agree to the way we have arrived at our calculations."
- Round 1 – Melbourne lose their season opener against the Auckland Warriors 14–6, with Robbie Kearns suggesting the team "were just too full of confidence from last year's [premiership] win I think," while Brett Kimmorley saying "there was a bit of cockiness. We weren't ready to play. We weren't ready to do any hard work. There was nobody prepared to do anything hard. The first 40 minutes were just rubbish."
- 7 February – Team manager Mick Moore dies in tragic circumstances in Auckland on the evening after Melbourne's loss against the Auckland Warriors. Moore was socialising with team officials when he fell from a wharf. Moore's funeral is held in Brisbane on 10 February.
- Round 2 – Melbourne suffer a 38–6 loss against the Newcastle Knights, eclipsing the club's heaviest defeat. The Storm conceded seven tries before scoring a late try when Russell Bawden finished off a passing play from Brett Kimmorley.
- Round 3 – Melbourne lose three matches in a row for the first time in club history, losing 16–12 to the Canberra Raiders, despite an improved performance in the second half after falling behind 8–2 at half time. The defeat had Melbourne placed last on the NRL ladder.
- 25 February – Coach Chris Anderson is reappointed Kangaroos coach for 2000.
- Round 4 – Storm lose their fourth match in a row, again struggling in the first half of their match against Penrith. Down 18–8 at half time, Melbourne got within two points in the second half, before the Panthers steadied to win 30–22. A frustrated Chris Anderson saying "it was the dumbest loss we've ever had." Rookie goalkicker Tasesa Lavea missed his first four shots at goal in the loss, finally landing his first goal on his fifth attempt after the fulltime siren. The loss, combined with North Queensland's first win of the season, left the Storm anchored at the bottom of the NRL ladder.
- 29 February – St George Illawarra Dragons' five-eighth Anthony Mundine trash talks Melbourne ahead of the 1999 Grand Final rematch at the MCG by declaring "I don't feel the Storm deserved to win the grand final."
- 3 March – In a further provocation, Mundine writes in a weekly newspaper column that "I think they (the Storm) are nothing but pretenders. Many critics are saying some of the statements I make do nothing but fire up the opposition. That's exactly what I want to do. I don't want Melbourne to come up with any excuses. I want them to be at their best. I want them to be fired up and I want St George Illawarra to crush them because nothing is sweeter than revenge."
- Round 5 – Snapping a four-game losing streak to start the season, Melbourne humiliate St George Illawarra 70–10 at the MCG in a stunning rebuttal against Anthony Mundine. The 70 points sets a new club record, and the 60-point margin also is a new club record. Melbourne became only the fourth team in Australian rugby league history to score 70+ points. Despite heavy rain, the attendance of 23,239 was also the highest for a Storm match in Melbourne. Glenn Lazarus parades the NRL premiership trophy before the game, having retired at the end of the 1999 season. Fullback Robbie Ross played his 100th match, scoring two tries in the victory. Tasesa Lavea scored 24 points in the match from two tries and eight goals.
- 9 March – Chris Anderson signs a new contract to stay with Melbourne until the end of the 2002 season.
- Round 6 – A second successive first half blitz sees Melbourne lead 30–0 against Sydney Roosters, before going on to win 42–10. The Storm opened the scoring in the third minute when Robbie Ross crunched Sydney Roosters halfback Adrian Lam with a shoulder charge, gathering the loose ball to pass to Marcus Bai, with the winger able to pass back inside for Ross to score the try.
- Round 7 – Marcus Bai suffers a serious arm laceration in a collision with the advertising signage at Olympic Park. Bai was rushed to hospital as a result of the incident with the cut deep enough to expose bone. John Lomax made his first appearance for the Storm in the match, coming into the team as a late change in place of Danny Williams. Melbourne came from 12–4 down at half time to take the win against Parramatta, when Scott Hill set up a try to Robbie Ross late in the match. In the lead-up to the fixture, it was thought that the match would either have to be rescheduled or moved with Olympic Park double-booked with the Little Athletics Australia state championships. That issue was only resolved when the athletics carnival agreed to finish earlier, with the Storm match rescheduled to start an hour later than normal. The injury to Bai kept him out of the Storm squad until the middle of the season, after an initial prognosis of six weeks. It is later revealed that a protective rubber coating was missing from the signage that caused the injury.
- Round 8 – Cronulla-Sutherland Sharks forward Jason Stevens accuses Ben Roarty of biting him during the match. Three players, including Storm forwards Stephen Kearney and Rodney Howe were sent to the sin bin by referee Bill Harrigan following an all-in brawl at a scrum in the second half. Cronulla won the match 24–16, with Melbourne unable to win their first away match for the season. NRL Judiciary Commissioner Jim Hall later dismisses the biting charge against Roarty due to a lack of evidence after Stevens refuses to advance with the allegations.Roarty vehemently denied the claim by Stevens.
- Round 9 – Melbourne maintained its unbeaten record in Victoria for the season, beating North Queensland 28–6, holding the visitors scoreless in the second half.
- Round 10 – A converted try midway through the second half by the Brisbane Broncos levelled the scores at 18–all in their match against Melbourne at ANZ Stadium. A missed penalty goal by Tasesa Lavea and missed field goal attempts in the final five minutes saw the teams deadlocked at full time. The draw was Melbourne's first since the 1998 season.
- 14 April – With up to 11 players off contract at the end of the season, it's reported that the Storm would offer "lifetime" contracts to key players Robbie Kearns, Stephen Kearney and Rodney Howe to keep them from leaving the club. CEO Chris Johns saying "We would like to think all three of them could finish their careers here."
- Round 11 – Melbourne continued their unbeaten record at home by thrashing the Northern Eagles 44–18 at Olympic Park. Ahead of the Anzac Test, Brett Kimmorley was instrumental in the win, with Matt Geyer scoring a hat-trick of tries. Tasesa Lavea had a personal points total of 18 points, scoring two tries and five of his six conversion attempts. Following the match, Kimmorley was named at halfback in the Australian team for their test match against New Zealand, picked ahead of Andrew Johns who then withdrew from the squad.
- 16 April – Chairman John Ribot tells the media that the absence of a fixed schedule of matches costs each club in excess of A$4m annually.
- 20 April – Wayne Evans was ruled out for the remainder of the season after it was revealed he required neck surgery after injuring himself making a tackle while playing for Norths Devils. Evans was considered lucky that further damage had not been done as he has continued to train with the squad.
- 21 April – In the Anzac Test, Melbourne suffers a dual injury blow with Matt Rua sent to hospital for scans on a neck injury, while Richard Swain suffered a low-grade hamstring injury. Both players did not miss any Storm matches though, recovering enough to take their places in the team for the next match.
- Round 12 – Leading 20–16 at half time, Melbourne pile on the points in the second half to take a comfortable 44–22 win over the Bulldogs in the club's first match at Stadium Australia since the 1999 NRL Grand Final. The Storm had seven players backing up following the Anzac Test, with only Rodney Howe ruled out with a injury — the win took the club to fourth on the NRL ladder following their winless month to start the season.
- Round 13 – After an even first half where the scores were level at 4–4 at half time, Melbourne put in a dominant second half performance to defeat the Newcastle Knights 40–4. Brett Kimmorley scored a hat-trick of tries in the win, the third match in a row where the Storm had score 40 or more points.
- 2 May – Russell Bawden becomes the first Storm player picked for the Queensland State of Origin team, joining five teammates selected in the NSW team. Robbie Ross was forced to withdraw from the NSW squad after scans revealed a knee injury picked up in the match against the Knights would keep him sidelined for up to two months.
- Round 14 – Missing 11 players through Origin selection and injury, Melbourne hand debuts to a number of players, including drafting in Brook Martin from Queensland Cup team Easts Tigers. The team is defeated 18–8 by the Parramatta Eels, their first loss since round 8. Melbourne had got close to stealing a win before the Eels scored late in the match.
- Round 15 – Melbourne score 40 points again, crossing for seven tries against the Wests Tigers to win 40–10 at Olympic Park. It was a second half blitz again, after the Storm fell behind 4–0 at half time. Stephen Kearney and Marcus Bai were placed on report for a dangerous spear tackle on Wests Tigers forward Jarrod McCracken. The tackle inflicted a serious neck injury on McCracken. Kearney is later suspended for eight matches, with Bai receiving a one match suspension, after pleading guilty at the NRL Judiciary. Melbourne were also sanctioned by the NRL after the superstitious Bai wore number 55 in the match, a breach of NRL policy that all jersey numbers must not be higher than 25.
- 12 May – Fullback Robbie Ross is ruled out for the rest of the season with a serious knee injury, undergoing a knee reconstruction.
- 21 May – It's announced that the club had inked new contracts with forwards Rodney Howe, Robbie Kearns, and Stephen Kearney. Howe signed on until the end of the 2024 season, while Kearns and Kearney signing until the end of the 2003 season.

Even if we had been beaten I was rapt in the effort. The defence was just so good all day...to come in here for the week and do that, for me the result was immaterial. But to win, it was a four-pointer for us. Either way it was a tremendous effort from blokes who are still finding out who's who.

— Chris Anderson, following the round 16 win against the Broncos
- Round 16 – Again depleted by Origin selection, Melbourne score a famous last-second win of 16–12 over a similarly depleted Brisbane Broncos. Halfback Kevin Carmichael threw the final pass to Peter Robinson to score a try next to the posts, in what fans dubbed the Norths Devils win over the Toowoomba Clydesdales after both teams' feeder clubs in the Queensland Cup competition. The win was Melbourne's eighth in Victoria for the season.
- Round 17 – With Marcus Bai given leave to participate in the 2000 Summer Olympics torch relay in Port Moreseby, Melbourne lose their first home match of the season, going down 23–20 against the Penrith Panthers. The visitors were up 10–0 early, but the Storm levelled after half time, before the Panthers pulled away again — Melbourne came back in the final five minutes, but their charge fell short. Following the match, Rodney Howe was cited with a careless high tackle charge and suspended for two matches by the NRL Judiciary, ruling him out of the second Origin match.
- 28 May – Despite being under contract, it is reported in The Sun-Herald that Melbourne has granted Brett Kimmorley permission to negotiate with rival clubs.
- 2 June — Melbourne also give permission to Marcus Bai, Matt Geyer, Aaron Moule and Tony Martin to test their market value, with the club remaining hopeful that each player would sign new contract with the Storm.
- 4 June – Marcus Bai signs a new three-year deal to stay with Melbourne.
- Round 18 – St George Illawarra inflict Melbourne's worst defeat and highest score conceded, thrashing Storm 50–4 in Wollongong. The reversal of fortunes coming just 13 weeks after the 70–10 game at the MCG. Melbourne again were missing a number of players due to Origin selection.
- Round 19 – Following a third straight loss, Melbourne drop out of the top eight for the first time since round 10. Their 41–6 loss to the Sydney Roosters coming after the Roosters led 33–0 at half time with coach Chris Anderson lamenting his team "played like 13 strangers."Interchange forward Danny Williams came into criticism from Roosters captain Brad Fittler, accused of throwing an uppercut while defending. The incident was missed by the match officials and Williams was not cited by the match review.
- Round 20 – Matt Geyer equals his own club record with four tries in a game, as Melbourne thrash Auckland 56–10 to win the Michael Moore Trophy.The result snapped the club's losing streak was boosted by the return of the suspended Rodney Howe and the return to form of Brett Kimmorley. Melbourne ran in ten tries in the match, five of them from inside their own half. Danny Williams, filling in at centre after Tony Martin left the field with a neck injury, scored a double, with Russell Bawden also scoring two tries.
- 21 June – The club confirms the signing of Wests Tigers prop forward Brenton Pomery for the remainder of the season after releasing Dane Morgan to join the Wests Tigers. Pomery was brought in as cover for John Lomax who was ruled out of the rest of the season after undergoing surgery on a calf injury.
- Round 21 – In the club's second match at the MCG, it was goalkicking that proved the difference in the Storm's 22–16 win against the Sharks. It was four tries each, with Tasesa Lavea's three goals from five attempts the winning margin. Melbourne officials were disappointed with the final attendance figure of 15,535 as they had hoped for a larger crowd.
- 26 June – Centre Tony Martin announces he will be leaving Melbourne at the end of the 2000 season to play with the London Broncos. It is also revealed that despite announcing in August 1999 that Brett Kimmorley had been signed until the end of the 2002 season, Melbourne had not finalised a contract extension with the halfback.
- Round 22 – North Queensland almost cause an upset coming from 26–6 down with less than 15 minutes to play to fall just four points short of Melbourne. The Storm winning their third match in a row 26–22.
- 4 July – Coach Chris Anderson accuses Brett Kimmorley of betrayal after Kimmorley announces he has signed a two-year deal with Northern Eagles. Kimmorley had previously been linked with deals to join the Brisbane Broncos, Sydney Roosters or switch to rugby union.
- Round 23 – Days after the death of Canterbury-Bankstown Bulldogs patriarch Peter "Bullfrog" Moore the father-in-law of both coaches; Melbourne lose to Canterbury 31–22 in what Chris Anderson called the "worst performance in the three years we've been here." In a unique milestone, Danny Williams becomes the first player to register 100 games starting from the interchange bench in Australian rugby league history.
- Round 24 – Rodney Howe becomes the first Melbourne player to be sent off. Howe is sent from the field for a high tackle on Geoff Toovey by referee Sean Hampstead, but has the charges dropped by the NRL Judiciary. The Storm able to cover Howe's absence in the final quarter of the match to hold on to win 38–26. Marcus Bai scored a hat-trick, while Brad Watts scored two tries.
- 19 July – Matt Geyer rejects contract offers from Northern Eagles to re-sign with Melbourne.
- Round 25 – An injury depleted Canberra Raiders line-up upset Melbourne 20–16 at Olympic Park, closing the door on Melbourne's hopes of a top-four finish. The defeat had left the Storm needing a win from their final match of the season to make the finals, until other results made it impossible for Melbourne to drop out of the finals spots.
- 26 July – Northern Eagles halfback Matt Orford signs a two-year contract with Melbourne to replace Brett Kimmorley for the 2001 season.
- Round 26 – Melbourne secure sixth spot on the NRL ladder with a 36–26 win over Wests Tigers. In the first meeting between the teams since the spear tackle incident earlier in the season, Stephen Kearney is jeered by the Tigers' fans, but scores a late try to give Storm the lead. Wests Tigers Wing John Hopoate is cited in the match for contrary conduct relating to 10 separate incidents, including a head slam tackle on Scott Hill.
- 1 August — At the Dally M Awards, Tasesa Lavea won the Rookie of the Year Award, while Brett Kimmorley was named Dally M Halfback of the Year. For the second year in a row, Brett Kimmorley finished second in the Dally M Medal count, five points behind winner Trent Barrett.
- 5 August – Robbie Ross signs a four-year contract to stay with the club.

We gave ourselves a tough task going into the finals and they're a good bunch of blokes and they work hard, but it just wasn't our year.

— Chris Anderson, following the qualifying final loss against the Knights
- Qualifying Final – Melbourne are defeated by Newcastle Knights 30–16 at a packed Marathon Stadium. In wet conditions, Melbourne took the lead just seconds before the half time break, but their 10–8 lead did not last long into the second half. The result was Melbourne's third straight loss at the venue. Melbourne were then eliminated from the finals after seventh placed Parramatta Eels beat Sydney Roosters under the McIntyre final eight system. The result happens as Storm are on their flight back to Melbourne.
- 9 August – Brett Kimmorley is named Rugby League Week's player of the year.
- 16 August – Wayne Evans is released by the club as midseason signing Brenton Pomery is signed for the 2001 season.
- 23 August – Melbourne sign former Australian Schoolboys centre Junior Langi to a two-year contract. Langi had made his NRL debut with the Dragons during the season.
- 28 August – It is revealed that Melbourne and Canterbury-Bankstown Bulldogs plan to play their first match of the 2001 season in Hong Kong.
- 24 September – Paul Marquet announces he has signed a one-year contract to return to Newcastle Knights.
- 3 November – Melbourne strike a deal with Colonial Stadium management to play all 2001 season home games at the venue, leaving Olympic Park. Plans to play the club's opening game in Hong Kong are cancelled.
- 6 December – It was reported that Melbourne Storm might need to provide substantial financial assistance to feeder club Norths Devils. Straddled with debts, the Brisbane club was reportedly considering a "takeover" proposal from the Storm.
- 8 December – The club was issued with a breach notice by the NRL for exceeding the A$3.25m salary cap. It was rumoured that the excessive payments totalled less than A$100,000. It was believed Melbourne were one of eight clubs issued noticed. Melbourne were set to argue their case to the NRL that their calculations were incorrect. It was thought that Melbourne had wrongly paid a player for public appearances outside the salary cap.
- 12 December – After weeks of speculation, the Australian Football League officially cancelled a proposed cross-code gaelic football match that was proposed between the Western Bulldogs and Melbourne Storm which would have been played at Colonial Stadium in late January 2001.
- 19 December – Adecco sign a three-year $4m sponsorship agreement with Melbourne to have their logo on the front of Storm jerseys beginning with the 2001 season.

=== Milestone games ===
Round	Player	Milestone
Round 3	Stephen Kearney	150th game
Round 4	Tony Martin	50th game
Round 4	Ben Roarty	50th game
Round 5	Robbie Ross	100th game
Round 7	Matt Geyer	50th game
Round 7	John Lomax	Storm debut
Round 8	Aaron Moule	50th game
Round 13	Fifita Moala	NRL debut
Round 14	Brook Martin	NRL debut
Round 14	Kevin Carmichael	Storm debut
Round 14	Glen Turner	NRL debut
Round 14	Peter Robinson	NRL debut
Round 14	Dane Morgan	Storm debut (Note: Morgan also played in the 2000 World Club Challenge game which is his official Storm debut.)
Round 16	Chris Essex	NRL debut
Round 18	Matt Rua	50th game
Round 22	Paul Marquet	200th game
Round 23	Brenton Pomery	Storm debut
Qualifying Final	Rodney Howe	100th game

=== Jerseys ===
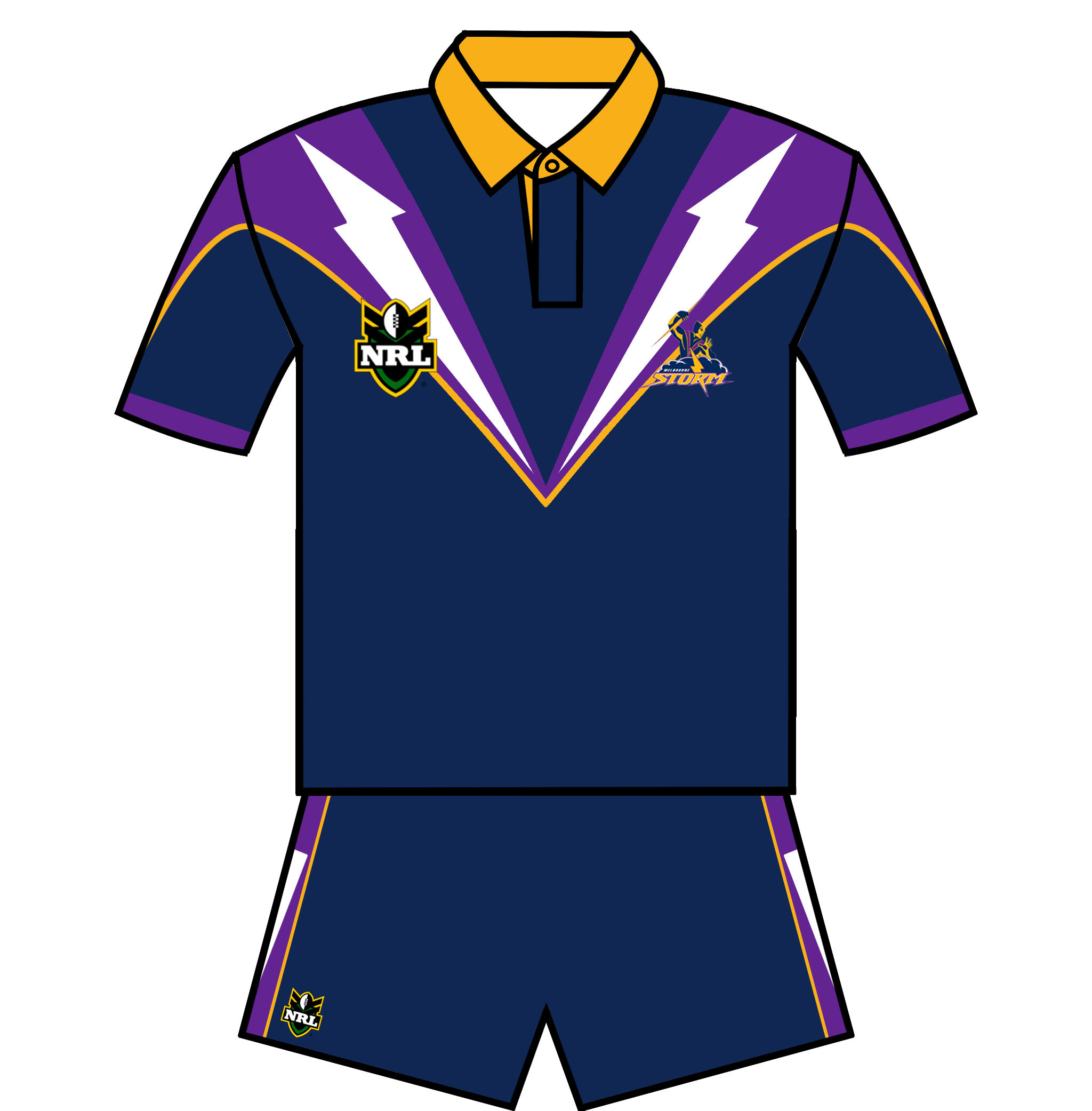
2000 home jersey

Melbourne's jerseys were again manufactured by Fila and carried the same designs as the 1999 home and away jerseys. A special "Millennium" jersey design was worn in the 2000 World Club Challenge and again in round 5 against St George Illawarra Dragons. Using the home design as a template, the jersey featured reflective silver thunderbolts. The gold away jersey was only worn in rounds 19, 22, and 26.

It was later reported that Melbourne were fined A$10,000 for wearing their home jerseys in the qualifying final against the Newcastle Knights after the NRL had requested that the club wear their clash jerseys.

== Fixtures ==
=== Preseason ===
Date	Rd	Opponent	Venue	Result	Mel.	Opp.	Tries	Goals	Field goals	Ref
14 January	Trial	Brisbane Broncos	Athletic Oval, Toowoomba	Lost	18	38	M Dux, G McKellar, F Moala	B Watts 2/2, T Lasea 1/1		

2000 World Club Challenge

Saturday, 22 January
18:00 GMT (UTC+0)

St. Helens	6 – 44	Melbourne Storm
Tries: 1 Hoppe 72'; Goals: 1 Long pen 20' (1/2)	1st: 2–20; 2nd: 4–24; Report	Tries: 8 Hill 39', 57'; Ross 66', 75'; Moule 5'; Evans 11'; Bai 30'; Morgan 50'; Goals: 6 Watts 11', 40', 51', 57', 66', 75' (6/8)

JJB Stadium, Wigan
Attendance: 13,394
Referee: Stuart Cummings (England)
Player of the Match: Brett Kimmorley

=== Regular season ===
==== Result by round ====
Round	1	2	3	4	5	6	7	8	9	10	11	12	13	14	15	16	17	18	19	20	21	22	23	24	25	26
Ground	A	A	A	A	H	H	H	A	H	A	H	A	H	A	H	H	H	A	A	H	H	A	H	A	H	A
Result	L	L	L	L	W	W	W	L	W	D	W	W	W	L	W	W	L	L	L	W	W	W	L	W	L	W
Position	10	14	14	14	11	10	9	9	8	9	7	4	4	4	3	3	3	7	9	7	5	3	6	3	6	6
Points	0	0	0	0	2	4	6	6	8	9	11	13	15	15	17	19	19	19	19	21	23	25	25	27	27	29

Source: Rugby League Tables
A = Away; H = Home; N = Neutral; B = Bye; W = Win; D = Draw; L = Loss

==== Matches ====
Date	Rd	Opponent	Venue	Result	Mel.	Opp.	Tries	Goals	Field goals	Ref
6 February	1	Auckland Warriors	Erisson Stadium, Auckland	Lost	6	14	S Hill	B Watts 1/2		
12 February	2	Newcastle Knights	Marathon Stadium, Newcastle	Lost	6	38	R Bawden	M Geyer 1/1		
19 February	3	Canberra Raiders	Bruce Stadium, Canberra	Lost	12	16	M Geyer, R Ross	M Geyer 1/2, T Lavea 1/1		
19 February	4	Penrith Panthers	Penrith Stadium, Sydney	Lost	22	30	B Roarty (2), M Bai, S Kearney, A Moule	T Lavea 1/5		
3 March	5	St George Illawarra Dragons	MCG, Melbourne	Won	70	10	B Kimmorley (2), T Lavea (2), R Ross (2), M Bai, S Hill, A Moule, B Roarty, R Swain, D Williams	T Lavea 8/9, M Geyer 3/3		
10 March	6	Sydney Roosters	Olympic Park, Melbourne	Won	42	10	M Bai (2), T Martin (2), A Moule (2), R Ross (2)	T Lavea 5/8		
18 March	7	Parramatta Eels	Olympic Park, Melbourne	Won	16	12	A Moule, R Ross, M Rua	T Lavea 2/4		
25 March	8	Cronulla Sharks	Toyota Park, Sydney	Lost	14	26	S Hill, R Kearns, B Kimmorley	T Lavea 1/3		
1 April	9	North Queensland Cowboys	Olympic Park, Melbourne	Won	28	6	A Moule (2), R Kearns, B Kimmorley, M Rua	T Lavea 4/8		
7 April	10	Brisbane Broncos	ANZ Stadium, Brisbane	Draw	18	18	B Kimmorley, T Lavea, R Ross	T Lavea 3/4		
15 April	11	Northern Eagles	Olympic Park, Melbourne	Won	44	18	M Geyer (3), T Lavea (2), R Bawden, S Kearney, R Ross	T Lavea 5/6, M Geyer 1/2		
25 April	12	Canterbury-Bankstown Bulldogs	Stadium Australia, Sydney	Won	22	44	M Geyer, S Hill, S Kearney, P Marquet, T Martin, A Moule, B Roarty, R Ross	T Lavea 6/8		
30 April	13	Newcastle Knights	Olympic Park, Melbourne	Won	40	4	B Kimmorley (3), M Geyer (2), A Moule, B Roarty	T Lavea 6/9		
5 May	14	Parramatta Eels	Parramatta Stadium, Sydney	Lost	8	18	F Moala	B Watts 2/3		
12 May	15	Wests Tigers	Olympic Park, Melbourne	Won	40	10	T Lavea (2), M Bai, M Geyer, B Kimmorley, M Rua, B Watts	T Lavea 6/7		
21 May	16	Brisbane Broncos	Olympic Park, Melbourne	Won	16	12	P Marquet, F Moala, P Robinson	T Lavea 2/6		
27 May	17	Penrith Panthers	Olympic Park, Melbourne	Lost	20	23	B Kimmorley, M Rua, B Watts, D Williams	T Lavea 2/4		
4 June	18	St George Illawarra Dragons	WIN Stadium, Wollongong	Lost	4	50	T Martin	M Geyer 0/1		
11 June	19	Sydney Roosters	Sydney Football Stadium, Sydney	Lost	6	41	M Bai	T Lavea 1/1		
18 June	20	Auckland Warriors	Olympic Park, Melbourne	Won	56	10	M Geyer (4), R Bawden (2), D Williams (2), M Bai, R Howe	T Lavea 8/10		
24 June	21	Cronulla-Sutherland Sharks	MCG, Melbourne	Won	22	16	M Bai, B Kimmorley, F Moala, B Watts	T Lavea 3/5		
1 July	22	North Queensland Cowboys	Dairy Farmers Stadium, Townsville	Won	26	22	R Bawden, M Geyer, A Moule, D Williams	T Lavea 5/6		
8 July	23	Canterbury-Bankstown Bulldogs	Olympic Park, Melbourne	Lost	22	31	M Geyer, S Hill, F Moala, B Roarty	T Lavea 3/6		
15 July	24	Northern Eagles	NorthPower Stadium, Gosford	Won	38	26	M Bai (3), B Watts (2), S Hill, B Kimmorley	B Watts 5/8		
21 July	25	Canberra Raiders	Olympic Park, Melbourne	Lost	16	20	M Bai, A Moule, M Rua	B Watts 2/4		
29 July	26	Wests Tigers	Campbelltown Stadium, Sydney	Won	36	26	A Moule (2), M Bai, R Bawden, S Kearney, T Martin	T Lavea 6/9		

=== Finals ===
Qualifying final

Saturday, 5 August
14:40 AEST (UTC+10)

Newcastle Knights	30 – 16	Melbourne Storm
Tries: 5 Hughes 22'; Gidley 48'; McDougall 58'; Buderus 66'; Tahu 72'; Goals: 5 A Johns pen 18', 23', 49', 59', 67' (5/7)	1st: 8–10; 2nd: 22–6; Report	Tries: 2 Martin 40'; Kimmorley 79'; Goals: 4 Lavea pen 30', 40', 80' (3/3); Watts pen 2' (1/1)

Marathon Stadium, Newcastle
Attendance: 20,597
Referee: Tim Mander

== Ladder ==
2000 NRL season
Pos	Team	Pld	W	D	L	PF	PA	PD	Pts	Qualification
1	Brisbane Broncos (P)	26	18	2	6	696	388	+308	38	Advance to finals series
2	Sydney Roosters	26	16	0	10	601	520	+81	32	Advance to finals series
3	Newcastle Knights	26	15	1	10	686	532	+154	31	Advance to finals series
4	Canberra Raiders	26	15	0	11	506	479	+27	30	Advance to finals series
5	Penrith Panthers	26	15	0	11	573	562	+11	30	Advance to finals series
6	Melbourne Storm	26	14	1	11	672	529	+143	29	Advance to finals series
7	Parramatta Eels	26	14	1	11	476	456	+20	29	Advance to finals series
8	Cronulla-Sutherland Sharks	26	13	0	13	570	463	+107	26	Advance to finals series
9	St George Illawarra Dragons	26	12	0	14	576	656	−80	24	
10	Wests Tigers	26	11	2	13	519	642	−123	24	
11	Canterbury-Bankstown Bulldogs	26	10	1	15	469	553	−84	21	
12	Northern Eagles	26	9	0	17	476	628	−152	18	
13	Auckland Warriors	26	8	2	16	426	662	−236	18	
14	North Queensland Cowboys	26	7	0	19	436	612	−176	12 (Note: North Queensland were stripped of two competition points due to a breach of the interchange rule in round 4.)	

Source: RLP
(P) Premiers

== 2000 Coaching Staff ==
- Head coach: Chris Anderson
- Assistant coaches: Greg Brentnall & Steve Anderson
- Physiotherapist: Greg Gibson
- Head trainer: Steve Litvensky
- Strength and conditioning Coach: Aaron Salisbury

== 2000 squad ==
List current as of 4 August 2021

Cap (Note: Players are listed with the cap number as they appear on the Melbourne Storm honour board. Additional squad members do not have a cap number.)	Nat.	Player name	Position	First Storm Game	Previous First Grade RL club (Note: This column denotes the previous RL club the player was signed to and played first grade RL for. If they are yet to debut then this is stipulated. If they were merely signed to the club but did not play then it is not counted.)
1	(Australia)	Robbie Ross	FB	1998	(Australia) Hunter Mariners
3	(Australia)	Aaron Moule	WG, CE	1998	(Australia) South Queensland Crushers
5	(Papua New Guinea)	Marcus Bai	WG	1998	(Australia) Gold Coast Chargers
6	(Australia)	Scott Hill	FE	1998	(Australia) Hunter Mariners
7	(Australia)	Brett Kimmorley	HB	1998	(Australia) Hunter Mariners
8	(Australia)	Rodney Howe	PR	1998	(Australia) Perth Reds
9	(Australia)	Danny Williams	LK, SR, HK	1998	(Australia) North Sydney Bears
10	(Australia)	Robbie Kearns	PR	1998	(Australia) Perth Reds
11	(Australia)	Paul Marquet	PR, SR	1998	(Australia) Hunter Mariners
12	(Australia)	Ben Roarty	PR, SR, LK	1998	(Australia) Melbourne Storm
15	(New Zealand)	Richard Swain	HK	1998	(Australia) Hunter Mariners
16	(Australia)	Russell Bawden	PR	1998	(Australia) Brisbane Broncos
18	(Australia)	Matt Geyer	WG	1998	(Australia) Perth Reds
19	(Australia)	Wayne Evans	SR	1998	(Australia) Perth Reds
21	(Australia)	Tony Martin	WG, CE	1998	(England) London Broncos
23	(Australia)	Wade Fenton	SR, PR	1998	(Australia) Melbourne Storm
26	(New Zealand)	Matt Rua	PR, SR	1998	(Australia) Melbourne Storm
28	(New Zealand)	Stephen Kearney	SR	1999	(Australia) New Zealand Warriors
30	(New Zealand)	Tasesa Lavea	FE	1999	(Australia) Melbourne Storm
31	(Australia)	Brad Watts	FB	1999	(Australia) Melbourne Storm
32	(Australia)	Brett O'Farrell	PR	1999	(Australia) Melbourne Storm
33	(New Zealand)	John Lomax	PR	2000	(Australia) North Queensland Cowboys
34	(Tonga)	Fifita Moala	WG	2000	(Australia) Melbourne Storm
35	(Australia)	Brook Martin	WG	2000	(Australia) Melbourne Storm
36	(Australia)	Kevin Carmichael	HB	2000	(Australia) South Queensland Crushers
37	(New Zealand)	Glen Turner	SR	2000	(Australia) Melbourne Storm
38	(Australia)	Peter Robinson	SR	2000	(Australia) Melbourne Storm
39	(Australia)	Dane Morgan	SR	2000	(Australia) North Sydney Bears
40	(Australia)	Chris Essex	PR	2000	(Australia) Melbourne Storm
41	(Australia)	Brenton Pomery	PR	2000	(Australia) Wests Tigers
—	(Australia)	Caan Chase	SR	Yet to Debut	(Australia) Melbourne Storm
—	(Australia)	Matthew Dux	WG	Yet to Debut	(Australia) Melbourne Storm
—	(New Zealand)	Tai Lavea	FB	Yet to Debut	(Australia) Melbourne Storm
—	(Fiji)	Setariki Rakabula	CE	Yet to Debut	(Australia) Melbourne Storm
—	(Australia)	Mark Shillington	PR	Yet to Debut	(Australia) Melbourne Storm

== Player movements ==
Losses

- Ben Anderson to Released
- Paul Bell to Leeds Rhinos
- Tristan Brady-Smith to Released
- Daniel Frame to Released
- Aseri Laing to Released
- Glenn Lazarus to Retirement
- Dane Morgan to Wests Tigers (Note: Released midseason)
- Tawera Nikau to Warrington Wolves
- Craig Smith to Retirement

Gains

- John Lomax from North Queensland Cowboys
- Dane Morgan from North Sydney Bears
- Brenton Pomery from Wests Tigers (Note: Midseason signing)
- Setariki Rakabula from Fiji

== 2000 World Club Challenge team ==
Melbourne Storm
2000 World Club Challenge Team	Interchange	Coach
1 Robbie Ross – FB; 2 Brad Watts – WG; 3 Aaron Moule – CE; 4 Tony Martin – CE; 5 Marcus Bai – WG; 6 Scott Hill – FE; 7 Brett Kimmorley – HB; 8 Wayne Evans – PR; 9 Richard Swain – HK; 10 Robbie Kearns (c) – PR; 11 Paul Marquet – SR; 12 Stephen Kearney – SR; 13 Matt Rua – LK	14 Danny Williams; 15 Tasesa Lavea; 16 Russell Bawden; 18 Dane Morgan	Head coach: Chris Anderson; Legend: (c) Captain(s); (vc) Vice-captain(s)

== Representative honours ==
This table lists all players who have played a representative match in 2000.

Player	2000 ANZAC Test	State of Origin 1	State of Origin 2	State of Origin 3	October Test	2000 Rugby League World Cup
Marcus Bai	—N/a	—N/a	—N/a	—N/a	Papua New Guinea	Papua New Guinea
Russell Bawden	—N/a	Queensland	Queensland	—N/a	—N/a	—N/a
Scott Hill	Australia	New South Wales	New South Wales	New South Wales	Australia	Australia
Rodney Howe	Australia	New South Wales	New South Wales	—N/a	—N/a	—N/a
Stephen Kearney	New Zealand	—N/a	—N/a	—N/a	—N/a	New Zealand
Robbie Kearns	Australia	New South Wales	New South Wales	New South Wales	Australia	Australia
Brett Kimmorley	Australia	New South Wales	New South Wales	New South Wales	Australia	Australia
Tasesa Lavea	New Zealand	—N/a	—N/a	—N/a	—N/a	New Zealand
Fifita Moala	—N/a	—N/a	—N/a	—N/a	—N/a	Tonga
Setariki Rakabula	—N/a	—N/a	—N/a	—N/a	—N/a	Fiji
Matt Rua	New Zealand	—N/a	—N/a	—N/a	—N/a	New Zealand
Richard Swain	New Zealand	—N/a	—N/a	—N/a	—N/a	New Zealand
Danny Williams	—N/a	—N/a	—N/a	—N/a	—N/a	Ireland

== Statistics ==
This table contains playing statistics for all Melbourne Storm players to have played in the 2000 NRL season.

- Statistics sources:

Name	Appearances	Tries	Goals	Field goals	Points
Marcus Bai	18	13	0	0	52
Russell Bawden	24	6	0	0	24
Kevin Carmichael	3	0	0	0	0
Chris Essex	1	0	0	0	0
Wayne Evans	3	0	0	0	0
Wade Fenton	3	0	0	0	0
Matt Geyer	27	14	6	0	68
Scott Hill	24	6	0	0	24
Rodney Howe	21	1	0	0	4
Stephen Kearney	19	4	0	0	16
Robbie Kearns	24	2	0	0	8
Brett Kimmorley	24	13	0	0	52
Tasesa Lavea	24	7	81	0	190
John Lomax	3	0	0	0	0
Paul Marquet	24	2	0	0	8
Brook Martin	1	0	0	0	0
Tony Martin	23	6	0	0	24
Fifita Moala	10	4	0	0	16
Dane Morgan	1	0	0	0	0
Aaron Moule	27	13	0	0	52
Brett O'Farrell	10	0	0	0	0
Brenton Pomery	5	0	0	0	0
Ben Roarty	24	6	0	0	24
Peter Robinson	6	1	0	0	4
Robbie Ross	13	9	0	0	36
Matt Rua	26	5	0	0	20
Richard Swain	27	1	0	0	4
Glen Turner	3	0	0	0	0
Brad Watts	20	5	11	0	42
Danny Williams	26	5	0	0	20
30 players used	—	123	98	0	688

=== Scorers ===
Most points in a game: 24 points

- Round 5 – Tasesa Lavea (2 tries, 8 Goals) vs St George Illawarra Dragons

Most tries in a game: 4 (Note: Equal club record)

- Round 20 – Matt Geyer vs Auckland Warriors

=== Winning games ===
Highest score in a winning game: 70 points (Note: New club record)

- Round 5 vs St George Illawarra Dragons

Lowest score in a winning game: 16 points

- Round 7 vs Parramatta Eels
- Round 16 vs Brisbane Broncos

Greatest winning margin: 60 points

- Round 5 vs St George Illawarra Dragons

Greatest number of games won consecutively: 3

- Round 5 – Round 7
- Round 11 – Round 13
- Round 20 – Round 22

=== Losing games ===
Highest score in a losing game: 22 points

- Round 4 vs Penrith Panthers
- Round 23 vs Canterbury-Bankstown Bulldogs

Lowest score in a losing game: 4 points

- Round 18 vs St George Illawarra Dragons

Greatest losing margin: 46 points

- Round 18 vs St George Illawarra Dragons

Greatest number of games lost consecutively: 4

- Round 1 – Round 4

=== NRL Judiciary ===
A number of Melbourne players were cited by the match review committee for incidents through the 2000 season, with the following results from the NRL Judiciary.

Round	Player	Offence & grade	Result (Note: 100 demerit points equals one match suspension.)	Ref
Round 3	Wayne Evans	Kicking (Grade 1)	3 matches (355 demerit points)	
Round 15	Stephen Kearney	Dangerous throw (Grade 3)	8 matches (884 demerit points)	
Round 15	Marcus Bai	Dangerous throw (Grade 1)	1 match (187 demerit points)	
Round 17	Rodney Howe	Careless high tackle (Grade 3)	2 matches (233 demerit points)	
Round 24	Rodney Howe	Careless high tackle	Charge withdrawn	
Round 25	Matt Rua	Careless high tackle (Grade 1)	1 match (131 demerit points)	

== Feeder Team ==
Melbourne Storm reserve players again travelled to Brisbane each week to play with Queensland Cup team Norths Devils. Making the finals for the third straight season, Norths Devils finished fifth and were eliminated in the first week of the 2000 Queensland Cup finals. Steven Bell won the Devils player of the year award, earning himself a contract with Melbourne for the 2001 season.

2000 Queensland Cup
Pos	Team	Pld	W	D	L	PF	PA	PD	Pts
5	Norths Devils	22	13	1	8	589	484	+105	27

== Awards and honours ==
=== Trophy Cabinet ===
- 2000 World Club Challenge Trophy
- Michael Moore Trophy (Round 20)

=== Melbourne Storm Awards Night ===
Held at Olympic Park on Friday, 1 September:

- Melbourne Storm Player of the Year: Rodney Howe
- Melbourne Storm Rookie of the Year: Tasesa Lavea
- Melbourne Storm Members' Player of the Year: Brett Kimmorley
- Melbourne Storm Clubman of the Year: Richard Swain
- Mick Moore Chairman's Award: Paul Marquet
- Hit of the Year: Robbie Ross (round 5)

=== Dally M Awards Night ===
Held at the Sydney Town Hall on Tuesday, 1 August:

- Dally M Halfback of the Year: Brett Kimmorley
- Dally M Rookie of the Year: Tasesa Lavea

=== Additional Awards ===
- World Club Challenge Medal: Brett Kimmorley
- Rugby League Annual – Players of the Year: Brett Kimmorley
- Rugby League Annual – Team of the Year: Robbie Kearns (Prop)
- Rugby League Annual – Team of the Year: Scott Hill (Lock)
