= 2000 Anzac Test =

Australia	New Zealand
52	0
	1	2	Total
AUS	22	30	52
NZL	0	0	0
- Date: 21 April 2000
- Stadium: Stadium Australia
- Location: Sydney, Australia
- Referee: Bill Harrigan (Australia)
- Attendance: 26,023

Broadcast partners
- Broadcasters: Nine Network (AUS) Sky Sport (NZ)
- Commentators: Ray Warren; Phil Gould; Peter Sterling

The 2000 Anzac test was a rugby league test match played between Australia and New Zealand at the Sydney Olympic Stadium 21 April 2000. It was the fourth Anzac test played between the two nations since the first was played under the Super League banner in 1997 and the third to be played in Sydney.

== Squads ==
Scott Hill and Chris McKenna made their test debuts for Australia, while Tasesa Lavea made his debut for New Zealand.

Australia	Position	New Zealand
Darren Lockyer	Fullback	Richie Barnett (c)
Mat Rogers	Wing	Nigel Vagana
Ryan Girdler	Centre	Richie Blackmore
Shaun Timmins	Centre	Henry Paul
Wendell Sailor	Wing	Lesley Vainikolo
Brad Fittler (c)	Five-eighth	Robbie Paul
Brett Kimmorley	Halfback	Stacey Jones
Shane Webcke	Prop	Joe Vagana
Jason Hetherington	Hooker	Richard Swain
Rodney Howe	Prop	Craig Smith
Gorden Tallis	Second-row	Matt Rua
Bryan Fletcher	Second-row	Stephen Kearney
Jason Smith	Lock	Tyran Smith
Jason Stevens	Interchange	Tony Puletua
Robbie Kearns	Interchange	Jason Lowrie
Scott Hill	Interchange	David Kidwell
Chris McKenna	Interchange	Tasesa Lavea
Chris Anderson	Coach	Frank Endacott

== Match Summary ==
Australia withstood an early challenge from the Kiwis before running in four tries in the first half with a further five tries after the break. The win set a then record winning margin and highest score for Australia in rugby league test matches against New Zealand. With two tries and eight goals, Mat Rogers set the individual points scoring record for Australia at 24 points in matches against New Zealand, breaking the record of Eric Simms.

New Zealand forward Matt Rua was rushed to hospital during the second half of the match, after suffering a neck injury during the first half. He was joined in hospital for x-rays by captain Richie Barnett who suffered a suspected fracture cheekbone after a collision with Australian winger Wendell Sailor late in the match.

Friday, 21 April 2000
19:30 AEST (UTC+10)

Australia	52 – 0	New Zealand
Tries: 9 Brad Fittler (2); Mat Rogers (2); Ryan Girdler; Chris McKenna; Wendell Sailor; Gorden Tallis; Shaun Timmins; Goals: 8 Mat Rogers 8/9	1st: 22–0; 2nd: 30–0; Report	Tries: 0 Goals: 0

Stadium Australia, Sydney
Attendance: 26,023
Referee: Bill Harrigan
