= Wayne Evans (rugby league) =

Australian rugby league footballer

Personal information
- Born: 3 October 1974 (age 52) West Wyalong, New South Wales, Australia

Playing information
- Height: 187 cm (6 ft 2 in)
- Weight: 105 kg (16 st 7 lb)
- Position: Prop, Second-row
Club
Years	Team	Pld	T	G	FG	P
1995–97	Western Reds	14	1	0	0	4
1998–00	Melbourne Storm	32	2	0	0	8
2001	Northern Eagles	25	1	0	0	4
2002	London Broncos	19	2	0	0	8
	Total	90	6	0	0	24

Wayne Evans (born 3 October 1974) is a former professional rugby league footballer who played in the 1990s, and 2000s. He played for the Melbourne Storm of the NRL. He also previously played for the Northern Eagles and Western Reds, as well as for the London Broncos in the Super League competition.

== Early life ==
Evans was educated at St Gregory's College, Campbelltown, where he represented 1993 Australian Schoolboys.

== Playing career ==
Recruited from South Tweed, Evans joined the Western Reds, making his debut in the 1995 ARL season. After the Reds were wound up at the end of the 1997 Super League season, Evans was signed by the newly formed Melbourne Storm.

Evans made his Melbourne Storm debut in round 4 of the 1998 NRL season against North Sydney Bears. Evans played just 12 games in the 1999 NRL season, missing the second half of the season due to back injuries, as the Storm went on to win the 1999 NRL Grand Final. Evans then travelled to England as part of the Melbourne Storm squad to contest the 2000 World Club Challenge against Super League Champions St Helens, with Evans playing as a prop and scoring a try in the victory.

Injured while making a tackle playing for Norths Devils in the Queensland Cup, Evans missed most of the 2000 season recovering from neck surgery.

At the end of the 2000 NRL season Evans signed to play with the Northern Eagles, joining Storm halfback Brett Kimmorley transferring to the joint venture club. Evans ended his rugby league with the London Broncos at the end of the 2002 Super League season.
