= Marcus Bai =

PNG international rugby league footballer

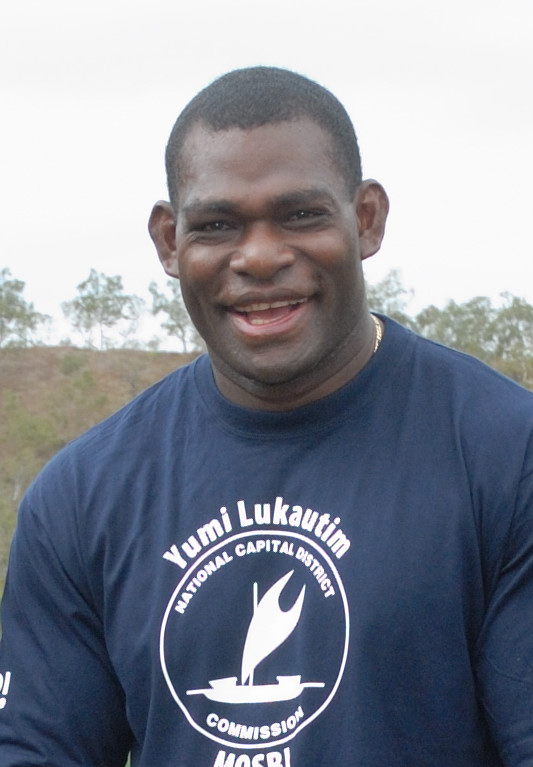

Personal information
- Born: 11 October 1972 (age 54) Ulamona, West New Britain, Papua New Guinea

Playing information
- Height: 5 ft 11 in (180 cm)
- Weight: 14 st 5 lb (91 kg)
- Position: Wing
Club
Years	Team	Pld	T	G	FG	P
1997	Hull FC	8	2	0	0	8
1997	Gold Coast Chargers	18	5	0	0	20
1998–03	Melbourne Storm	144	70	1	0	282
2004–05	Leeds Rhinos	63	45	0	0	180
2006	Bradford Bulls	26	12	0	0	48
	Total	259	134	1	0	538
Representative
Years	Team	Pld	T	G	FG	P
1995–06	Papua New Guinea	13	4	0	0	16
1997	Rest of the World	1	0	0	0	0
- Relatives: Cooper Bai (son)

Marcus "George" Bai (born 11 October 1972) is a Papua New Guinean former professional rugby league footballer who played in the 1990s and 2000s. An international representative winger, he represented Papua New Guinea on numerous occasions including at the 1995 Rugby League World Cup. Bai played club football for English clubs Hull FC, Leeds Rhinos and the Bradford Bulls, as well as Australian clubs the Gold Coast Chargers and Melbourne Storm. He became the first player to have won the World Club Challenge with three clubs. In 2005 he was minutes away from being the first person to win all of the major domestic competitions in both Australia and England (NRL Premiership, Super League, World Club Challenge, League Leaders Shield and Challenge Cup) however Hull F.C. struck with minutes to go in the Challenge Cup final to deny Leeds Rhinos the Challenge Cup and him a place in the history books.

== Early life ==
Bai was born in Ulamona, West New Britain Province of Papua New Guinea. He began playing rugby league for the Port Moresby Vipers, and represented Papua New Guinea at the 1995 Rugby League World Cup.

== Playing career ==
=== Hull ===
He began his professional career playing for Hull F.C. in England where he made eight appearances for them in 1997.

=== Gold Coast Chargers ===
Bai then moved to the Gold Coast Chargers in Australia. He played the final 18 games of the 1997 ARL season, scoring five tries. That year he was selected in the 'Rest of the World' side to play a match against an Australian Rugby League test side.

=== Melbourne Storm ===
The newly formed Melbourne Storm signed Bai for 1998, their inaugural season. He was named Dally M Winger of the Year in his first year at Melbourne Storm. In his second season for Melbourne he played in every game, culminating in his appearance on the wing in Melbourne's 1999 NRL Grand Final-winning side. Having won the 1999 Premiership, Melbourne Storm contested in the 2000 World Club Challenge against Super League Champions St. Helens, with Bai playing on the wing and scoring a try in the victory. Bai again represented Papua New Guinea, this time at the 2000 Rugby League World Cup playing in all four of Papua New Guinea's games and scoring three tries. That year for the Melbourne Storm, Bai was hampered by injuries, including being cut on his right arm by the steel advertising boards. In all he spent six years playing for the Melbourne Storm, playing 144 first grade games and scoring a total of 70 tries.

=== Leeds Rhinos ===
After displaying his ability with some impressive performances for Melbourne Storm, Bai transferred to English Super League club the Leeds Rhinos. His début for the club was against Castleford Tigers on the Boxing Day Festive Challenge during which he scored a try after coming off the bench. His full first team début came against the London Broncos on the opening day of the 2004 Super League season. He announced his arrival at the club in the best possible fashion, by scoring a hat-trick on his full début in front of the Leeds Rhinos home crowd. Marcus Bai had become an instant hit with the Leeds fans. Later that year in his first full season for Leeds, Marcus Bai scored a hat-trick in the grand final eliminator which helped Leeds on their way to booking their place at Old Trafford. He played for the Leeds Rhinos on the wing in their 2004 Super League Grand Final victory against the Bradford Bulls. As Super League IX champions, the Rhinos faced 2004 NRL season premiers, the Bulldogs in the 2005 World Club Challenge. Bai played on the wing in Leeds' 39-32 victory. Bai played for Leeds in the 2005 Challenge Cup Final on the wing and scored a try in their loss against Hull FC.

In 2005, Bai was again impressive making 32 appearances and scoring 19 tries in all competitions. In all he spent two full seasons with Leeds making 63 appearances and scoring 45 tries including four hat-tricks. He is currently just one of seven players to win a Grand Final in the premier Rugby League competitions in both Super League, and National Rugby League. He played for the Leeds Rhinos on the wing in their 2005 Super League Grand Final loss against the Bradford Bulls.

Bai left the Leeds Rhinos after spending two successful years with them. He penned a contract with the Bradford Bulls for the 2006 Super League season.

=== Bradford Bulls ===
Bai scored two tries in his Bradford Bulls début in the 2006 World Club Challenge match against the Wests Tigers in which the Bradford Bulls won 30–10. Although he missed two months of the season with a knee injury, Bai scored 12 tries in 26 appearances for the club, and he was awarded the club's Best Back of the Year Award at the end of the season. Bai signed a new one-year contract extension with Bradford Bulls in September 2006, but changed his mind a few months later and announced his retirement from the sport in December 2006.

=== Representative ===
He started as left wing for Rest of the World in the 11 July 1997 one-off 28-8 defeat to Australia, which was played at the Suncorp Stadium, Brisbane.

== Statistics ==
=== NRL ===
Statistics are correct to the end of career

†	Denotes seasons in which Bai won an NRL Premiership

Season	Team	Matches	T	G	GK %	F/G	Pts	W	L	D	W-L %
1997	Gold Coast	18	5	0	—	0	20	8	9	1	47.2
1998	Melbourne	27	14	0	—	0	56	18	8	1	68.5
1999†	Melbourne	28	12	0	—	0	48	19	9	0	67.9
2000	Melbourne	18	13	0	—	0	52	9	9	0	50.0
2001	Melbourne	21	11	0	—	0	44	8	13	0	38.1
2002	Melbourne	24	9	0	—	0	36	9	14	1	39.6
2003	Melbourne	26	11	1	100	0	46	16	10	0	61.5
Career totals		162	75	1	100	0	302	87	72	3	54.63

=== Super League ===
†	Denotes seasons in which Bai won a Super League Championship

Season	Team	Matches	T	G	GK %	F/G	Pts	W	L	D	W-L %
2004†	Leeds Rhinos	29	26	0	—	0	104	24	3	2	86.2
2005	Leeds Rhinos	28	16	0	—	0	64	21	7	0	75.0
2006	Bradford Bulls	24	9	0	—	0	36	15	8	1	64.6
Career totals		81	51	0	—	0	204	60	18	3	74.07

=== Papua New Guinea ===
Season	Team	Matches	T	G	GK %	F/G	Pts	W	L	D	W-L %
1995	Papua New Guinea	2	1	0	—	0	4	0	1	1	25.0
1996	Papua New Guinea	3	0	0	—	0	0	0	3	0	0.0
2000	Papua New Guinea	5	1	0	—	0	4	3	2	0	60.0
2001	Papua New Guinea	1	0	0	—	0	0	0	1	0	0.0
2007	Papua New Guinea	1	0	0	—	0	0	0	1	0	0.0
Career totals		12	2	0	—	0	8	3	8	1	29.17
