= Richie Barnett =

NZ and NZ Maori international rugby league footballer

Personal information
- Full name: Richard Rohan Barnett
- Born: 21 April 1972 (age 54) Auckland, New Zealand

Playing information
- Height: 184 cm (6 ft 0 in)
- Weight: 91 kg (14 st 5 lb)
- Position: Fullback, Centre
Club
Years	Team	Pld	T	G	FG	P
	Otahuhu Leopards
1994–97	Cronulla Sharks	67	29	0	0	116
1998–00	Sydney Roosters	51	17	0	0	68
2001–02	London Broncos	38	13	0	0	52
2003–04	Hull F.C.	38	23	0	0	92
	Total	194	82	0	0	328
Representative
Years	Team	Pld	T	G	FG	P
	Auckland
1992–93	New Zealand Māori
1995–00	New Zealand	12	1	0	0	4

Richie Barnett (born 21 April 1972) is a New Zealand former professional rugby league footballer who played in the 1990s and 2000s. A New Zealand international representative fullback, he also captained the side during his career, during which he played for clubs in New Zealand, Australia and England. Following his playing career he became a columnist for The New Zealand Herald. In August 2021, it was announced that he would feature in the 2021 Season of Celebrity Treasure Island 2021.

== Playing career ==
While playing in New Zealand Barnett was selected to play in the 1992 Pacific Cup for the New Zealand Māori side. He joined Sydney club, Cronulla-Sutherland Sharks in 1994. The following year Barnett was selected to represent New Zealand at the 1995 World Cup. He was selected for New Zealand in the 1996 Super League World Nines tournament. He was selected to play at fullback for the Kiwis in the 1997 ANZAC Test. He also played in the 1997 Super League World Nines.

Barnett left the Sharks for cross-town rivals, the Sydney Roosters for the 1998 season. That year he was selected to go on the 1998 New Zealand rugby league tour of Great Britain and played at fullback in all three Tests, scoring two tries. The following year he was selected for the New Zealand team to compete in the end of season 1999 Rugby League Tri-Nations tournament. In the final against Australia he captained the Kiwis at fullback in their 22–20 loss. Barnett's 2000 season was cut short by a facial fracture he suffered during the 2000 ANZAC Test. He recovered in time to be selected to captain New Zealand from fullback at the 2000 World Cup. Barnett was succeeded as captain of New Zealand by Nathan Cayless.

After his NRL career ended, he played for the London Broncos in the Super League until 2002, and later Hull F.C. in 2003-04.

== Later years ==
He currently works as a broadcaster for SKY Network Television.

== Health ==
In the early 21st century, Barnett developed ME/CFS and has said that the condition was the reason for his retirement. In July 2015, he described himself as 80% recovered. In 2000, he sustained a facial injury during a match and had to have surgery that involved having 10 plates inserted into his skull. He has stated that he would rather go through that surgery again, than live with ME/CFS once more. He is the face of the Associated New Zealand ME Society (ANZMES).
