= Michael Moore Trophy =

Rugby league award

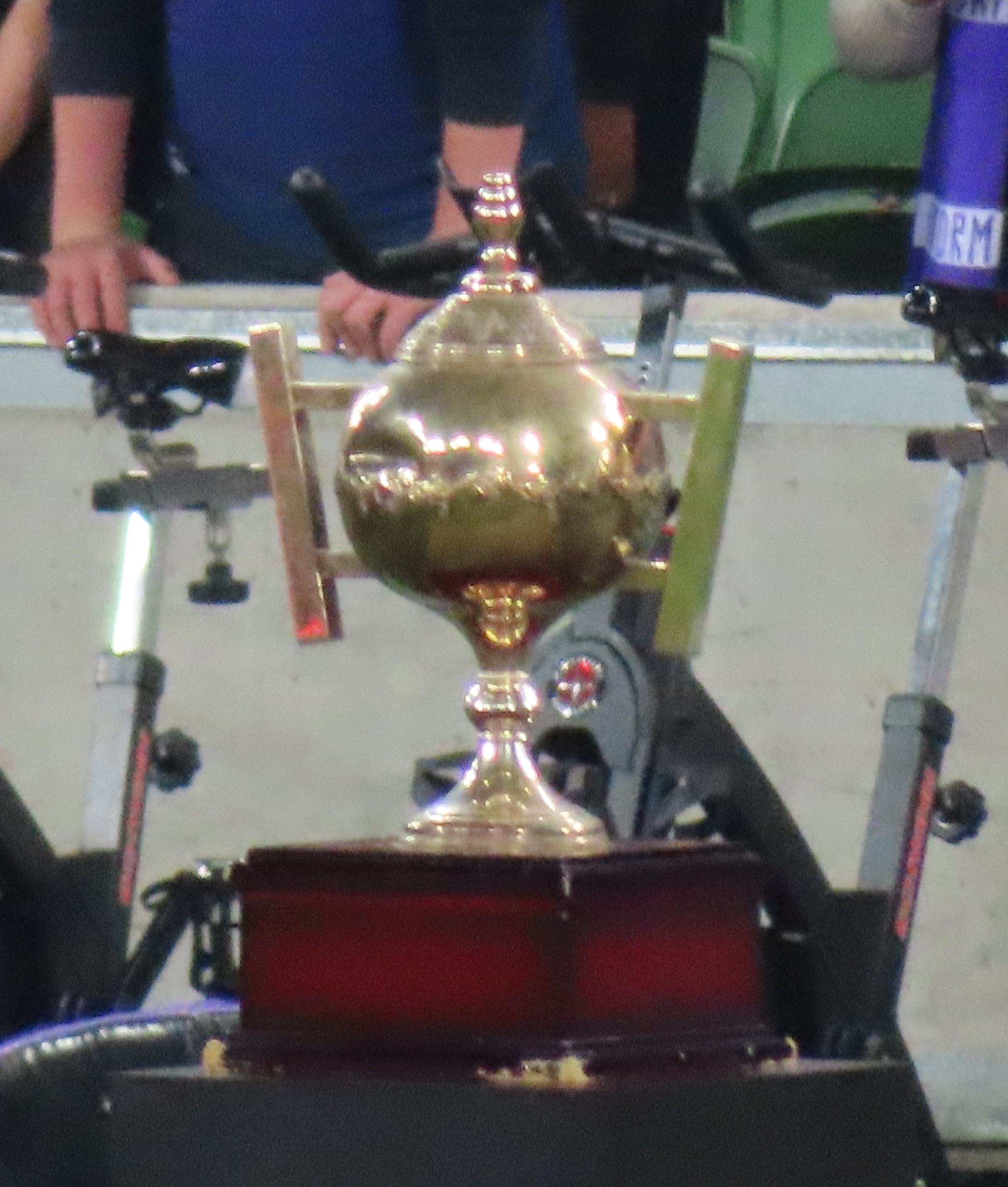
- A view of the back of the Michael Moore Trophy
- Sport: Rugby league
- Inaugural season: 2000
- Number of teams: Melbourne Storm; New Zealand Warriors
- Country: Australia (National Rugby League)
- Current holders: New Zealand Warriors (2026)

The Michael Moore Trophy is a rugby league trophy usually contested biannually during the National Rugby League season, in matches between the Melbourne Storm and the New Zealand Warriors. The Michael Moore Trophy was introduced in 2000 following the death of Melbourne Storm's inaugural football manager, Michael Moore, on 6 February 2000 in Auckland, New Zealand.

From 2009 to 2023, matches were regularly scheduled on 25 April, to coincide with ANZAC Day commemorations in Melbourne, with the game usually played in the evening at AAMI Park.

Melbourne held the trophy from 2016 through 2025, winning 17 matches in a row between the teams until the Warriors ended that streak in April 2026.

== Michael Moore ==
Michael Moore (1965–2000) was the inaugural football manager of the Melbourne Storm, controlling the day-to-day running of football operations. He joined Melbourne from the Brisbane Broncos, where he was part of that club's strength and conditioning program. Moore played rugby league in Queensland with Brisbane Brothers from 1984 to 1992, before finishing his playing career with Brisbane Souths in 1993. As well as his role with the Brisbane Broncos, he headed up the conditioning program for the Brisbane Bullets in 1996/97.

Outside of sport, Moore was a physical education teacher for two years in 1988–1989, and was a physical activities officer with the Queensland Police Service for nine years before moving to Victoria.

Moore had originally applied for the role of strength and conditioning coach at Melbourne, but was instead offered the role as football manager. Moore would be instrumental in setting up the club, making new players arriving at the club welcome, often acting as a father-figure for players and their families.

Moore's sudden death was devastating to the tight-knit Melbourne Storm club, with the Storm players jerseys carrying "Michael Moore 2000 Season" embroidery during 2000. Melbourne renamed the "Clubman of the Year" Medal in his honour, with the award combined with the Chairman's Award to become the Michael Moore Club Person of the Year trophy in 2005.

Michael Moore was survived by his wife Tracey, and children Harry, Meg, and Georgia.

== Results ==
=== 2000–2009 ===
2000

Round 1
6 February 2000

| Auckland Warriors | 14 – 6 | Melbourne Storm |
|---|---|---|
| Tries: Jason Death, Logan Swann, Tony Tuimavave; Goals: Ivan Cleary 1/2, Scott Pethybridge 0/1; Field Goal | | Tries: Scott Hill; Goals: Brad Watts 1/1; Field Goal |

Ericsson Stadium, Auckland
Attendance: 20,546
Referee: Sean Hampstead
Report:

Round 20
18 June 2000

| Melbourne Storm | 56 – 10 | Auckland Warriors |
|---|---|---|
| Tries: Matt Geyer (4), Russell Bawden (2), Danny Williams (2), Marcus Bai, Rodney Howe; Goals: Tasesa Lavea 8/10; Field Goal | | Tries: Henry Fa'afili, Lee Oudenryn; Goals: David Mulhall 1/3; Field Goal |

Olympic Park, Melbourne
Attendance: 13,028
Referee: Mark Oaten
Report:

2001

Round 12
12 May 2001
7:30pm local

| New Zealand Warriors | 20 – 40 | Melbourne Storm |
|---|---|---|
| Tries: Motu Tony (2), Monty Betham; Goals: Ivan Cleary 4/4; Field Goal | | Tries: Aaron Moule (2), Steven Bell, Scott Hill, Matt Orford, Robbie Ross, Danny Williams; Goals: Matt Orford 6/8; Field Goal |

Ericsson Stadium, Auckland
Attendance: 15,167
Referee: Tim Mander
Report:

Round 25
27 August 2001
7:30pm local

| Melbourne Storm | 24 – 24 | New Zealand Warriors |
|---|---|---|
| Tries: Steven Bell, Matt Geyer, Aaron Moule, Matt Orford, Henry Perenara; Goals: Matt Geyer 1/2, Matt Orford 1/3; Field Goal | | Tries: Shontayne Hape (2), Henry Fa'afili, David Myles; Goals: Stacey Jones 4/5; Field Goal |

Colonial Stadium, Melbourne
Attendance: 13,298
Referee: Tim Mander
Report:

2002

Round 7
27 April 2002
5:00pm local

| New Zealand Warriors | 20 – 10 | Melbourne Storm |
|---|---|---|
| Tries: Henry Fa'afili, Awen Guttenbeil, Francis Meli, Clinton Toopi; Goals: Ivan Cleary 2/4; Field Goal | | Tries: Scott Hill, Aaron Moule; Goals: Richard Swain 1/2; Field Goal |

Ericsson Stadium, Auckland
Attendance: 11,404
Referee: Steve Clark
Report:

Round 11
25 May 2002
3:00pm local

| Melbourne Storm | 12 – 28 | New Zealand Warriors |
|---|---|---|
| Tries: Matt Orford, Robbie Ross; Goals: Matt Orford 2/2; Field Goal | | Tries: Awen Guttenbeil, Lance Hohaia, Justin Murphy, Motu Tony; Goals: Ivan Cleary 6/6; Field Goal |

Olympic Park, Melbourne
Attendance: 8,873
Referee: Mark Oaten
Report:

2003

Round 21
2 August 2003

| New Zealand Warriors | 12 – 14 | Melbourne Storm |
|---|---|---|
| Tries: Vinnie Anderson, Clinton Toopi; Goals: Lance Hohaia 2/2; Field Goal | | Tries: Marcus Bai, Kirk Reynoldson; Goals: Matt Orford 3/4; Field Goal |

Ericsson Stadium, Auckland
Attendance: 15,207
Referee: Steve Clark
Report:

2004

Round 8
2 May 2004
2:00pm local

| New Zealand Warriors | 20 – 14 | Melbourne Storm |
|---|---|---|
| Tries: Sione Faumuina, Epalahame Luaki, Richard Villasanti; Goals: Sione Faumuina 4/4; Field Goal | | Tries: Steven Bell (2), Scott Hill; Goals: Cameron Smith 1/3; Field Goal |

Ericsson Stadium, Auckland
Attendance: 9,637
Referee: Tony Archer
Report:

Round 16
26 June 2004
7:30pm local

| Melbourne Storm | 42 – 6 | New Zealand Warriors |
|---|---|---|
| Tries: Matt King (3), Ben MacDougall (2), Steven Bell, David Kidwell, Billy Slater; Goals: Matt Orford 4/7, Dustin Cooper 1/1; Field Goal | | Tries: Tony Martin; Goals: Lance Hohaia 1/1; Field Goal |

Olympic Park, Melbourne
Attendance: 10,621
Referee: Steve Lyons
Report:

2005

Round 14
12 June 2005
4:30pm local

| New Zealand Warriors | 24 – 16 | Melbourne Storm |
|---|---|---|
| Tries: Todd Byrne (2), Francis Meli, Iafeta Palea'aesina, Jerome Ropati; Goals: Stacey Jones 2/5; Field Goal | | Tries: Matt Geyer (2), Cooper Cronk; Goals: Matt Orford 2/4; Field Goal |

Ericsson Stadium, Auckland
Attendance: 7,898
Referee: Jason Robinson
Report:

Round 23
13 August 2005
5:30pm local

| Melbourne Storm | 22 – 10 | New Zealand Warriors |
|---|---|---|
| Tries: Matt King (2), Matt Orford, Billy Slater; Goals: Matt Orford 3/4; Field Goal | | Tries: Nathan Fien, Francis Meli; Goals: Stacey Jones 1/2; Field Goal |

Olympic Park, Melbourne
Attendance: 11,072
Referee: Russell Smith
Report:

2006

Round 1
12 March 2006
2:00pm local

| New Zealand Warriors | 16 – 22 | Melbourne Storm |
|---|---|---|
| Tries: Wairangi Koopu, Jerome Ropati, Manu Vatuvei; Goals: Tony Martin 2/3; Field Goal | | Tries: Matt Geyer (2), Greg Inglis, Cameron Smith, Steve Turner; Goals: Greg Inglis 1/4, Cameron Smith 0/1; Field Goal |

Ericsson Stadium, Auckland
Attendance: 10,035
Referee: Steve Clark
Report:

Round 24
19 August 2006
7:30pm local

| Melbourne Storm | 20 – 24 | New Zealand Warriors |
|---|---|---|
| Tries: Matt Geyer, Greg Inglis, Matt King, Steve Turner; Goals: Cameron Smith 2/4; Field Goal | | Tries: Brent Webb (2), Simon Mannering, Manu Vatuvei; Goals: Lance Hohaia 4/5; Field Goal |

Olympic Park, Melbourne
Attendance: 13,477
Referee: Tony Archer
Report:

2007

Round 3
1 April 2007
12:00pm local

| Melbourne Storm | 30 – 12 | New Zealand Warriors |
|---|---|---|
| Tries: Israel Folau (2), Billy Slater (2), Ryan Hoffman, Matt King; Goals: Cameron Smith 3/6; Field Goal | | Tries: Sam Rapira, Manu Vatuvei; Goals: Tony Martin 2/2; Field Goal |

Olympic Park, Melbourne
Attendance: 12,874
Referee: Shayne Hayne
Report:

Round 13
10 June 2007
4:00pm local

| New Zealand Warriors | 2 – 4 | Melbourne Storm |
|---|---|---|
| Tries: Goals: Tony Martin 1/1; Field Goal | | Tries: Jeremy Smith; Goals: Steve Turner 0/1; Field Goal |

Mt Smart Stadium, Auckland
Attendance: 6,209
Referee: Ben Cummins
Report:

2008

Round 1
17 March 2008
7:00pm local

| Melbourne Storm | 32 – 18 | New Zealand Warriors |
|---|---|---|
| Tries: Billy Slater (3), Dallas Johnson, Sam Tagataese; Goals: Cameron Smith 5/6, Steve Turner 1/1; Field Goal | | Tries: Manu Vatuvei (2), Jerome Ropati; Goals: Michael Witt 3/3; Field Goal |

Telstra Dome, Melbourne
Attendance: 20,084
Referee: Ben Cummins
Report:

Round 20
27 July 2008
2:00pm local

| New Zealand Warriors | 8 – 6 | Melbourne Storm |
|---|---|---|
| Tries: Sonny Fai; Goals: Lance Hohaia 2/3; Field Goal | | Tries: Sika Manu; Goals: Cameron Smith 1/1; Field Goal |

Mt Smart Stadium, Auckland
Attendance: 8,700
Referee: Jared Maxwell
Report:

2009

Round 7
25 April 2009
5:45pm local

| Melbourne Storm | 14 – 14 | New Zealand Warriors |
|---|---|---|
| Tries: Will Chambers, Billy Slater, Steve Turner; Goals: Cameron Smith 1/3; Field Goal | | Tries: Manu Vatuvei (2), Patrick Ah Van; Goals: Denan Kemp 1/4; Field Goal |

Olympic Park, Melbourne
Attendance: 15,200
Referee: Tony Archer, Matt Cecchin

Report:

Spirit of ANZAC Medal: Adam Blair

Round 26
5 September 2009
5:30pm local

| New Zealand Warriors | 0 – 30 | Melbourne Storm |
|---|---|---|
| Tries: Goals: Field Goal | | Tries: Will Chambers (2), Ryan Hinchcliffe, Greg Inglis, Dane Neilsen, Billy Slater; Goals: Cameron Smith 3/5, Greg Inglis 0/1; Field Goal |

Mt Smart Stadium, Auckland
Attendance: 14,734
Referee: Ashley Klein, Alan Shortall
Report:

=== 2010–2019 ===
2010

Round 7
25 April 2010
6:00pm local

| Melbourne Storm | 40 – 6 | New Zealand Warriors |
|---|---|---|
| Tries: Matthew Duffie (2), Adam Blair, Willie Isa, Billy Slater, Cameron Smith, Ryan Tandy; Goals: Cameron Smith 6/7; Field Goal | | Tries: Ukuma Ta'ai; Goals: James Maloney 1/1; Field Goal |

Etihad Stadium, Melbourne
Attendance: 23,906
Referee: Gavin Badger, Brett Suttor

Report:

Spirit of ANZAC Medal: Cooper Cronk

Round 19
17 July 2010
7:30pm local

| New Zealand Warriors | 13 – 6 | Melbourne Storm |
|---|---|---|
| Tries: Jerome Ropati, Manu Vatuvei; Goals: James Maloney 2/5; Field Goal James Maloney | | Tries: Billy Slater; Goals: Cameron Smith 1/1; Field Goal |

Mt Smart Stadium, Auckland
Attendance: 13,118
Referee: Steve Lyons, Gerard Sutton
Report:

2011

Round 7
25 April 2011
7:00pm local

| Melbourne Storm | 14 – 18 | New Zealand Warriors |
|---|---|---|
| Tries: Beau Champion, Cooper Cronk; Goals: Cameron Smith 3/3; Field Goal | | Tries: Krisnan Inu, Jacob Lillyman, Michael Luck; Goals: James Maloney 3/4; Field Goal |

AAMI Park, Melbourne
Attendance: 22,694
Referee: Shayne Hayne, Gavin Morris

Report:

Spirit of ANZAC Medal: Krisnan Inu

Round 16
26 June 2011
2:00pm local

| New Zealand Warriors | 8 – 16 | Melbourne Storm |
|---|---|---|
| Tries: Lance Hohaia; Goals: James Maloney 2/2; Field Goal | | Tries: Billy Slater (2), Gareth Widdop; Goals: Cameron Smith 2/3; Field Goal |

Mt Smart Stadium, Auckland
Attendance: 13,362
Referee: Tony Archer, Brett Suttor
Report:

2012

Round 8
25 April 2012
7:00pm local

| Melbourne Storm | 32 – 14 | New Zealand Warriors |
|---|---|---|
| Tries: Will Chambers (3), Dane Nielsen (2), Justin O'Neill; Goals: Cameron Smith 4/6; Field Goal | | Tries: Bill Tupou (2), Lewis Brown; Goals: James Maloney 1/3; Field Goal |

AAMI Park, Melbourne
Attendance: 20,333
Referee: Tony Archer, Chris James

Report:

Spirit of ANZAC Medal: Kevin Proctor

Round 13
3 June 2012
4:00pm local

| New Zealand Warriors | 12 – 22 | Melbourne Storm |
|---|---|---|
| Tries: Konrad Hurrell, Manu Vatuvei; Goals: James Maloney 2/2; Field Goal | | Tries: Will Chambers, Jaiman Lowe, Cameron Smith, Gareth Widdop; Goals: Cameron Smith 3/5; Field Goal |

Mt Smart Stadium, Auckland
Attendance: 20,487
Referee: Matt Cecchin, Adam Devcich
Report:

2013

Round 7
25 April 2013
7:00pm local

| Melbourne Storm | 28 – 18 | New Zealand Warriors |
|---|---|---|
| Tries: Will Chambers (2), Mahe Fonua, Billy Slater, Sisa Waqa; Goals: Cameron Smith 4/5; Field Goal | | Tries: Ben Henry, Shaun Johnson, Bill Tupou; Goals: Shaun Johnson 3/4; Field Goal |

AAMI Park, Melbourne
Attendance: 25,480
Referee: Matt Cecchin, Henry Perenara

Report:

Spirit of ANZAC Medal: Ryan Hoffman

Round 20
28 July 2013
2:00pm local

| New Zealand Warriors | 30 – 22 | Melbourne Storm |
|---|---|---|
| Tries: Ngani Laumape (2), Konrad Hurrell, Thomas Leuluai, Kevin Locke; Goals: Shaun Johnson 5/6; Field Goal | | Tries: Maurice Blair, Cooper Cronk, Justin O'Neill, Billy Slater; Goals: Cameron Smith 3/5; Field Goal |

Mt Smart Stadium, Auckland
Attendance: 20,126
Referee: Ben Cummins, Henry Perenara
Report:

2014

Round 8
25 April 2014
6:00pm local

| Melbourne Storm | 10 – 16 | New Zealand Warriors |
|---|---|---|
| Tries: Kevin Proctor, Young Tonumaipea; Goals: Cameron Smith 1/2; Field Goal | | Tries: David Fusitu'a, Shaun Johnson, Feleti Mateo; Goals: Shaun Johnson 2/4; Field Goal |

AAMI Park, Melbourne
Attendance: 28,716
Referee: Ashley Klein, Adam Gee

Report:

Spirit of ANZAC Medal: Sebastine Ikahihifo

2015

Round 5
6 April 2015
5:00pm local

| Melbourne Storm | 30 – 14 | New Zealand Warriors |
|---|---|---|
| Tries: Marika Koroibete (2), Will Chambers, Mahe Fonua, Tim Glasby; Goals: Cameron Smith 5/5; Field Goal | | Tries: Nathan Friend, Sebastine Ikahihifo, Manu Vatuvei; Goals: Shaun Johnson 1/3; Field Goal |

AAMI Park, Melbourne
Attendance: 18,179
Referee: Adam Devcich, Gavin Reynolds
Report:

Round 18
12 July 2015
4:00pm local

| New Zealand Warriors | 28 – 14 | Melbourne Storm |
|---|---|---|
| Tries: Tuimoala Lolohea (2), David Fusitu'a, Shaun Johnson, Bodene Thompson; Goals: Shaun Johnson 4/7; Field Goal | | Tries: Kenny Bromwich (2), Marika Koroibete; Goals: Cameron Smith 1/3; Field Goal |

Mt Smart Stadium, Auckland
Attendance: 17,278
Referee: Gerard Sutton, Chris James
Report:

2016

Round 3
20 March 2016
4:00pm local

| New Zealand Warriors | 14 – 21 | Melbourne Storm |
|---|---|---|
| Tries: Solomone Kata, Tuimoala Lolohea, Jonathan Wright; Goals: Shaun Johnson 1/3; Field Goal | | Tries: Kenny Bromwich, Marika Koroibete, Cameron Munster; Goals: Cameron Smith 4/4; Field Goal Cooper Cronk |

Mt Smart Stadium, Auckland
Attendance: 16,214
Referee: Henry Perenara, David Munro
Report:

Round 8
25 April 2016
7:00pm local

| Melbourne Storm | 42 – 0 | New Zealand Warriors |
|---|---|---|
| Tries: Suliasi Vunivalu (2), Jesse Bromwich, Cooper Cronk, Tim Glasby, Tohu Harris, Marika Koroibete, Cameron Munster; Goals: Cameron Smith 5/8; Field Goal | | Tries: Goals: Field Goal |

AAMI Park, Melbourne
Attendance: 21,233
Referee: Matt Cecchin, Gavin Reynolds

Report:

Spirit of ANZAC Medal: Tohu Harris

2017

Round 2
10 March 2017
8:00pm local

| New Zealand Warriors | 10 – 26 | Melbourne Storm |
|---|---|---|
| Tries: Shaun Johnson, Tuimoala Lolohea; Goals: Shaun Johnson 1/2; Field Goal | | Tries: Cheyse Blair, Kenny Bromwich, Cooper Cronk, Suliasi Vunivalu; Goals: Cameron Smith 5/5; Field Goal |

Mt Smart Stadium, Auckland
Attendance: 9,811
Referee: Grant Atkins, Chris Butler
Report:

Round 8
25 April 2017
7:00pm local

| Melbourne Storm | 20 – 14 | New Zealand Warriors |
|---|---|---|
| Tries: Josh Addo-Carr, Nelson Asofa-Solomona, Cooper Cronk, Felise Kaufusi; Goals: Cameron Smith 2/5; Field Goal | | Tries: David Fusitu'a (2); Goals: Shaun Johnson 3/4; Field Goal |

AAMI Park, Melbourne
Attendance: 22,153
Referee: Ben Cummins, David Munro

Report:

Spirit of ANZAC Medal: Nelson Asafa-Solomona

2018

Round 8
25 April 2018
7:00pm local

| Melbourne Storm | 50 – 10 | New Zealand Warriors |
|---|---|---|
| Tries: Josh Addo-Carr (2), Ryley Jacks (2), Ryan Hoffman, Billy Slater, Young Tonumaipea, Christian Welch; Goals: Cameron Smith 9/9; Field Goal | | Tries: David Fusitu'a (2); Goals: Mason Lino 1/2; Field Goal |

AAMI Park, Melbourne
Attendance: 25,731
Referee: Gerard Sutton, Chris Sutton

Report:

Spirit of ANZAC Medal: Billy Slater

Round 19
22 July 2018
4:00pm local

| New Zealand Warriors | 6 – 12 | Melbourne Storm |
|---|---|---|
| Tries: Gerard Beale; Goals: Shaun Johnson 1/1; Field Goal | | Tries: Will Chambers, Suliasi Vunivalu; Goals: Cameron Smith 2/4; Field Goal |

Mt Smart Stadium, Auckland
Attendance: 17,695
Referee: Ben Cummins, Jon Stone
Report:

2019

Round 7
25 April 2019
7:50pm local

| Melbourne Storm | 13 – 12 | New Zealand Warriors |
|---|---|---|
| Tries: Jahrome Hughes, Cameron Munster; Goals: Cameron Munster 2/3; Field Goal Brodie Croft | | Tries: Adam Blair, Kem Maumalo; Goals: Chanel Harris-Tavita 2/3; Field Goal |

AAMI Park, Melbourne
Attendance: 21,539
Referee: Matt Cecchin, David Munro

Report:

Spirit of ANZAC Medal: Cameron Smith

Round 13
8 June 2019
3:00pm local

| New Zealand Warriors | 10 – 32 | Melbourne Storm |
|---|---|---|
| Tries: Ken Maumalo, Kodi Nikorima; Goals: Isaac Luke 1/2; Field Goal | | Tries: Jahrome Hughes, Jesse Bromwich, Marion Seve, Suliasi Vunivalu; Goals: Cameron Smith 6/7; Field Goal |

Mt Smart Stadium, Auckland
Attendance: 12,957
Referee: Henry Perenara, Jon Stone
Report:

=== 2020–present ===
2020

26 June 2020
Round 7
18:00 AEST (UTC+10)

| Melbourne Storm | 50 – 6 | New Zealand Warriors |
|---|---|---|
| Tries: 9 Suliasi Vunivalu 24', 55', 58'; Paul Momirovski 12', 31'; Ryan Papenhuyzen 27', 46'; Brandon Smith 62'; Josh Addo-Carr 73'; Goals: 7 Cameron Smith 25', 29', 33', 57', 59', 64', 75' (7/9) | 1st: 22–6; 2nd: 28–0; Report | Tries: 1 Patrick Herbert 42'; Goals: 1 Chanel Harris-Tevita 44' (1/1) |

Netstrata Jubilee Stadium, Sydney
Attendance: 90 (Note: Restricted attendance due to the COVID-19 pandemic in Australia)
Referee: Ben Cummins

2021

25 April 2021
Round 7
18:15 AEST (UTC+10)

| Melbourne Storm | 42 – 20 | New Zealand Warriors |
|---|---|---|
| Tries: 8 Reimis Smith 25', 31'; Josh Addo-Carr 64', 67'; George Jennings 3'; Felise Kaufusi 19'; Nicho Hynes 22'; Justin Olam 51'; Goals: 5 Cameron Munster 4', 20', 32', 65', 68' (5/8) | 1st: 26–4; 2nd: 16–16; Report | Tries: 4 Ken Maumalo 7', 73', 77'; Ben Murdoch-Masila 43'; Goals: 2 Kodi Nikorima 44', 78' (2/4) |

AAMI Park, Melbourne
Attendance: 20,320
Referee: Matt Cecchin
Spirit of ANZAC Medal: Jahrome Hughes (Melbourne)

13 June 2021
Round 14
14:00 AEST (UTC+10)

| New Zealand Warriors | 16 – 42 | Melbourne Storm |
|---|---|---|
| Tries: 3 Ken Maumalo 60', 76', 79'; Goals: 2 Kodi Nikorima pen 10', 79' (2/4) | 1st: 2–18; 2nd: 14–24; Report | Tries: 7 Dean Ieremia 22'; Brandon Smith 27'; Josh Addo-Carr 36'; Jahrome Hughes 44'; Justin Olam 56'; Harry Grant 66'; Tom Eisenhuth 72'; Goals: 7 Nicho Hynes pen 14', 23', 29', 44', 57', 68', 73' (7/8) |

Central Coast Stadium, Gosford
Attendance: 8,105
Referee: Matt Cecchin

2022

25 April 2022
Round 7
19:00pm AEST (UTC+10)

| Melbourne Storm | 70 – 10 | New Zealand Warriors |
|---|---|---|
| Tries: 13; Xavier Coates 22', 60', 66', 68'; Jahrome Hughes 7', 72'; Nick Meaney 26', 50'; Ryan Papenhuyzen 47', 52'; Harry Grant 58'; Jesse Bromwich 77'; Justin Olam 78'; Goals: 9 Ryan Papenhuyzen 28', pen 40', pen 42', 48', 51', 59', 67' (7/10); Nick Meaney 74', 78' (2/3); Harry Grant (0/1); Cameron Munster (0/1) | 1st: 16–10; 2nd: 54–0; Report | Tries: 2 Dallin Watene-Zelezniak 12'; Wayde Egan 29'; Goals: 1 Reece Walsh 31' (1/2) |

AAMI Park, Melbourne
Attendance: 22,696
Referee: Chris Sutton
Spirit of ANZAC Medal: Ryan Papenhuyzen

29 July 2022
Round 20
20:00 NZST (UTC+8)

| New Zealand Warriors | 12 – 24 | Melbourne Storm |
|---|---|---|
| Tries: 3 Edward Kosi 20', 33', 63'; Goals: 0 Reece Walsh (0/3) | 1st: 8–10; 2nd: 4–14; Report | Tries: 4 Justin Olam 6'; Harry Grant 26'; Jahrome Hughes 41'; Nick Meaney 53'; Goals: 4 Nick Meaney 7', 43', pen 57' (3/5); Cameron Munster pen 69' (1/1) |

Mt Smart Stadium, Auckland
Attendance: 18,395
Referee: Peter Gough

2023

25 April 2023
Round 8
19:00 AEST (UTC+10)

| Melbourne Storm | 30 – 22 | New Zealand Warriors |
|---|---|---|
| Tries: 5 Nick Meaney 47', 56'; Justin Olam 14'; Cameron Munster 34'; Harry Grant 75'; Goals: 5 Nick Meaney 16', 35', 49', 58', 76' (5/5) | 1st: 12–18; 2nd: 18–10; Report | Tries: 4 Dallin Watene-Zelezniak 10', 44'; Jackson Ford 4'; Addin Fonua-Blake 20'; Goals: 3 Shaun Johnson 5', 12', 21' (3/4) |

AAMI Park, Melbourne
Attendance: 23,469
Referee: Grant Atkins
Spirit of ANZAC Medal: Nick Meaney

2024

16 March 2024
Round 2
19:35 AEST (UTC+10)

| Melbourne Storm | 30 – 26 | New Zealand Warriors |
|---|---|---|
| Tries: 5 Ryan Papenhuyzen 22', 78'; Will Warbrick 4'; Nick Meaney 15'; Xavier Coates 80'; Goals: 5 Nick Meaney 5', 15', pen 18', 78', 80' (5/6) | 1st: 18–6; 2nd: 12–20; Report | Tries: 4 Dallin Watene-Zelezniak 11', 45'; Jackson Ford 49'; Marcelo Montoya 59'; Goals: 5 Luke Metcalf 12', 50', pen 59', pen 64', pen 71' (5/7) |

AAMI Park, Melbourne
Attendance: 21,927
Referee: Chris Butler

15 June 2024
Round 15
19:35 NZST (UTC+8)

| New Zealand Warriors | 24 – 38 | Melbourne Storm |
|---|---|---|
| Tries: 4 Marcelo Montoya 16', 75'; Adam Pompey 5'; Mitchell Barnett 46'; Goals: 4 Adam Pompey 6', pen 8', 18' (3/4); Chanel Harris-Tavita 76' (1/1); Sin bin: 2 Marcelo Montoya (yellow card) 54' to 64'; Dallin Watene-Zelezniak (yellow card) 61' to 71' | 1st: 14–20; 2nd: 10–18; Report | Tries: 7 Sualauvi Fa'alogo 55', 79'; Eliesa Katoa 20'; Grant Anderson 26'; Dean Ieremia 30'; Nick Meaney 35'; Xavier Coates 63'; Goals: 5 Nick Meaney 5', 15', pen 18', 78', 80' (5/6) |

Go Media Stadium, Auckland
Attendance: 24,465
Referee: Gerard Sutton

2025

13 April 2025
Round 6
14:00 AEST (UTC+10)

| Melbourne Storm | 42 – 14 | New Zealand Warriors |
|---|---|---|
| Tries: 7 Xavier Coates 3', 59'; Josh King 15'; Shawn Blore 21'; Trent Loiero 24'; Harry Grant 28'; Grant Anderson 31'; Goals: 7 Ryan Papenhuyzen 4', 16', 22', 25', 30', 32', 61' (7/7) | 1st: 36–0; 2nd: 6–14; Report | Tries: 3 Leka Halasima 55'; Rocco Berry 75'; Luke Metcalf 80'; Goals: 1 Luke Metcalf 56' (1/3); Sin bin: 1 Jackson Ford (yellow card) 23' to 33' |

AAMI Park, Melbourne
Attendance: 26,427
Referee: Ashley Klein

2026

11 April 2026
Round 6
19:35 AEST (UTC+10)

| Melbourne Storm | 14 – 38 | New Zealand Warriors |
|---|---|---|
| Tries: 2 Cooper Clarke 17'; Jack Howarth 24'; Goals: 3 Nick Meaney pen 4', 19', 24' (3/3) | 1st: 14–18; 2nd: 0–16; Report | Tries: 6 Dallin Watene-Zelezniak 31', 52'; Ali Leiataua 10'; Marata Niukore 15'; Roger Tuivasa-Sheck 44'; Jackson Ford 48'; Goals: 7 Tanah Boyd 12', 16', pen 40', 46', 49', 54', pen 59' (7/8) |

AAMI Park, Melbourne
Attendance: 26,467
Referee: Grant Atkins

== Head to Head ==
2000–2026

| | Played | Won | Lost | Draws | For | Against | Diff. |
|---|---|---|---|---|---|---|---|
| Melbourne Storm | 48 | 33 | 13 | 2 | 1246 | 723 | +523 |
| New Zealand Warriors | 48 | 13 | 33 | 2 | 723 | 1246 | -523 |

Overall 1998–2025 (including finals)

| | Played | Won | Lost | Draws | For | Against | Diff. |
|---|---|---|---|---|---|---|---|
| Melbourne Storm | 54 | 35 | 17 | 2 | 1360 | 825 | +535 |
| New Zealand Warriors | 54 | 17 | 35 | 2 | 825 | 1360 | -535 |

== Spirit of ANZAC Medal ==
In games played on ANZAC Day in Melbourne, a Spirit of ANZAC Medal is awarded to the player in the match considered to best exemplify the ANZAC spirit – skill, courage, self-sacrifice, teamwork and fair play.

=== Winners ===
- 2009 — Adam Blair (Melbourne Storm)
- 2010 — Cooper Cronk (Melbourne Storm)
- 2011 — Krisnan Inu (New Zealand Warriors)
- 2012 — Kevin Proctor (Melbourne Storm)
- 2013 — Ryan Hoffman (Melbourne Storm)
- 2014 — Sebastine Ikahihifo (New Zealand Warriors)
- 2015 — Daly Cherry-Evans (Manly Sea Eagles) (Note: Due to the 100 year anniversary of the Landing at ANZAC Cove, the New Zealand Warriors requested a home game (played against the Gold Coast Titans) on ANZAC Day 2015.)
- 2016 — Tohu Harris (Melbourne Storm)
- 2017 — Nelson Asofa-Solomona (Melbourne Storm)
- 2018 — Billy Slater (Melbourne Storm)
- 2019 — Cameron Smith (Melbourne Storm)
- 2020 — Not awarded
- 2021 — Jahrome Hughes (Melbourne Storm)
- 2022 — Ryan Papenhuyzen (Melbourne Storm)
- 2023 — Nick Meaney (Melbourne Storm)
- 2024 — Cameron Munster (Melbourne Storm) (Note: Awarded during the match between Melbourne Storm and the South Sydney Rabbitohs, due to the New Zealand Warriors requesting a home game (played against the Gold Coast Titans) on ANZAC Day 2024.)

== See also ==
- Rivalries in the National Rugby League
