= Glen Turner =

New Zealand rugby league footballer

Personal information
- Born: 22 February 1979 (age 47) Christchurch, New Zealand
- Height: 184 cm (6 ft 0 in)
- Weight: 100 kg (15 st 10 lb)

Playing information
- Position: Second-row
Club
Years	Team	Pld	T	G	FG	P
2000–05	Melbourne Storm	56	6	0	0	24
2007–09	Canberra Raiders	36	5	0	0	20
	Total	92	11	0	0	44
- Source: As of 20:36, 8 September 2008 (UTC)

Glen Turner (born 22 February 1979 in New Zealand) is a former professional rugby league footballer who played for the Melbourne Storm and Canberra Raiders. He played as a second row or lock.

== Playing career ==
Turner is from the Canterbury Rugby League and was a Junior Kiwi in 1998. He played for the Linwood club.

Turner played for the Melbourne Storm between 2000 and 2006 before moving to the Canberra Raiders where he stayed until 2009. In December 2009 he confirmed that he was retiring from professional rugby league.

Since retirement he has served as the Raiders' welfare officer.
