= Brook Martin =

Australian rugby league footballer

Personal information
- Full name: Brook Martin
- Born: 27 March 1981 (age 45) Southport, Queensland, Australia

Playing information
- Height: 185 cm (6 ft 1 in)
- Weight: 91 kg (14 st 5 lb)
- Position: Wing, Centre
Club
Years	Team	Pld	T	G	FG	P
2000	Melbourne Storm	1	0	0	0	0

Brook Martin (born 27 March 1981) is an Australian former professional rugby league footballer who played in the 2000s. He played in the National Rugby League (NRL) for the Melbourne Storm in 2000.

== Playing career ==
Martin did not play any junior club rugby league, instead playing for his school Christian Outreach College, where he excelled in athletics, especially hurdles. He was 110m hurdles Queensland schoolboys champion in 1997. In 1998, he finished third and decided to focus on rugby league, joining Easts Tigers, eventually making his senior debut in 2000.

He made his NRL debut in 2000 for the Melbourne Storm against Parramatta, playing on the wing. Martin was playing for Easts Tigers in 2000, but was drafted in by Melbourne to cover injuries and representative selections. He would go on to score 22 tries in 22 appearances for Easts in the Queensland Cup, transferring to Melbourne at the end of the 2000 season on a two-year contract.

Selected for the Junior Kangaroos at the end of the 2000 season, Martin's NRL career stalled as he didn't add to his single NRL appearance for Melbourne.
