= Dane Morgan =

Australian rugby league footballer

Personal information
- Born: 30 January 1979 (age 46); Sydney, New South Wales, Australia

Playing information
- Height: 194 cm (6 ft 4 in)
- Weight: 103 kg (16 st 3 lb)
- Position: Second-row
Club
Years	Team	Pld	T	G	FG	P
1999	North Sydney Bears	5	0	0	0	0
2000	Melbourne Storm	1	0	0	0	0
2000	Wests Tigers	1	0	0	0	0
2003–04	Oldham RLFC	2	2	0	0	8
2005	Batley Bulldogs	1	0	0	0	0
	Total	10	2	0	0	8

Dane Morgan (born 30 January 1979) is an Australian former rugby league footballer who played as a second-row forward in the 1990s and 2000s.

He played for the North Sydney Bears in 1999 and then for both the Wests Tigers and the Melbourne Storm in 2000.

== Early career ==
Morgan played schoolboy football with Holy Cross College and junior football with Leichhardt. He played junior representative games with Balmain Tigers, before transferring to Cronulla-Sutherland Sharks for under 17s.

== Playing career ==
Morgan played 5 games for the North Sydney Bears in the 1999 NRL season and was in the side for Norths final ever first grade game against the North Queensland Cowboys in Townsville.

Signed by Melbourne Storm, Morgan travelled to England as part of the Storm squad to contest the 2000 World Club Challenge against Super League Champions St Helens, with Morgan playing from the interchange bench and scoring a try the contributed to his team's victory. He made a solitary appearance for Melbourne in round 14 of the 2000 NRL season, before being released mid season.

Morgan then joined the Wests Tigers in the same year and played one game for the club which came in round 20 against the Brisbane Broncos which Wests lost 56–12 at ANZ Stadium.

Later in his career, Morgan played in England for two seasons with Oldham R.L.F.C.
