= Brenton Pomery =

Australian rugby league footballer

Personal information
- Full name: Brenton Pomery
- Born: 11 March 1973 (age 53) Sydney, New South Wales, Australia

Playing information
- Position: Prop, Second-row
Club
| Years | Team | Pld | T | G | FG | P |
|---|---|---|---|---|---|---|
| 1995–96 | North Sydney | 15 | 0 | 0 | 0 | 0 |
| 1998–99 | Western Suburbs | 6 | 0 | 0 | 0 | 0 |
| 2000 | Wests Tigers | 1 | 0 | 0 | 0 | 0 |
| 2000–01 | Melbourne Storm | 7 | 0 | 0 | 0 | 0 |
| | Total | 29 | 0 | 0 | 0 | 0 |

Brenton Pomery (born 11 March 1973), is an Australian former professional rugby league footballer who played in the 1990s and 2000s. He played for the North Sydney Bears from 1995 to 1996, the Western Suburbs Magpies from 1998 to 1999, the Wests Tigers in 2000 and finally the Melbourne Storm from 2000 to 2001.

== Playing career ==
Pomery made his first grade debut for Norths against Newcastle in the 1995 qualifying final which Newcastle won 20–10.

In 1996, Pomery played 14 games as Norths made the preliminary final against St George with Pomery playing in the match. St George went on to win 29–12 after narrowly leading 7–6 at half time. This was the club's third preliminary final defeat in six years.

In 1998, Pomery joined Western Suburbs and was part of the 1998 and 1999 sides which claimed back to back wooden spoons after coming last. In 2000, Pomery joined the Wests Tigers and played one game for the new club and then made a mid season switch joining defending premiers Melbourne Storm. Pomery was brought in by Melbourne as cover for John Lomax who was ruled out of the rest of the season after undergoing surgery on a calf injury.

Pomery's final game in first grade was a 32–28 loss against North Queensland in round 2 2001. He was released from the remainder of his Storm contract midway through the 2001 season, telling the media: "I'm an older style front-rower, just bash it up and get stuck in and play the game hard. They seem to be going for younger, quicker more mobile blokes these days." Pomery had a bad run with injuries through his career, having endured a broken arm and thumb, a serious groin injury, a shoulder reconstruction and two bad knee cartilage injuries.

Pomery is one of the few players to have gone his whole first grade career without scoring a try.
