= Scott Hill (rugby league) =

Australia international rugby league footballer

Scott "Bill" Hill
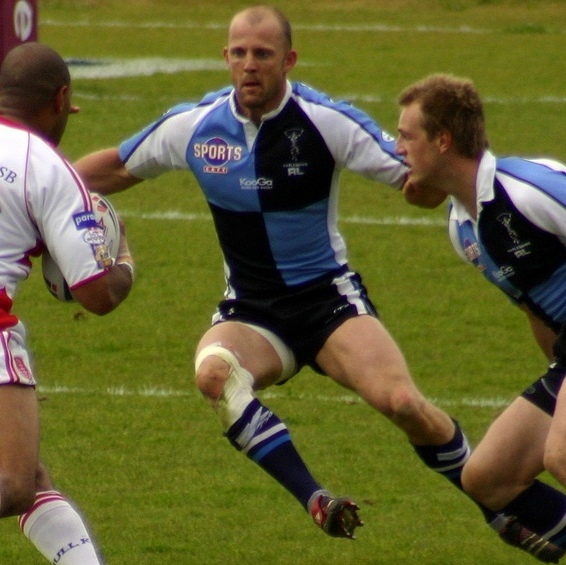

Personal information
- Full name: Scott Hill
- Born: 30 May 1977 (age 49) Dubbo, New South Wales, Australia

Playing information
- Height: 185 cm (6 ft 1 in)
- Weight: 93 kg (14 st 9 lb)
- Position: Five-eighth, Lock
Club
Years	Team	Pld	T	G	FG	P
1996	Canterbury Bulldogs	5	3	0	0	12
1997	Hunter Mariners	18	2	0	0	8
1998–06	Melbourne Storm	177	46	1	0	186
2007–08	Harlequins RL	45	14	0	0	56
	Total	245	65	1	0	262
Representative
Years	Team	Pld	T	G	FG	P
2000–02	New South Wales	5	1	0	0	4
2000–04	Australia	12	5	0	0	20
2001–05	NSW Country	3	2	0	0	8

Scott Hill (born 30 May 1977) is an Australian former professional rugby league footballer who played in the 1990s and 2000s. He was previously with the Harlequins RL club in the Super League. His usual position is at five-eighth. Hill previously played in Australia for the Melbourne Storm, Hunter Mariners (one of only two players to play in all the club's games in their lone season) and the Canterbury-Bankstown Bulldogs. Hill is a former New South Wales and Australian representative player.

== Playing career ==
=== Early career ===
Originally from Dubbo, Hill was playing with the Forster Tuncurry Hawks as a 15-year-old when he was spotted by Canterbury-Bankstown Bulldogs talent scouts. At the time he was undertaking a carpentry apprenticeship and opted to remain with his junior club, where he would play under the coaching of Dennis Tutty in the period when the Forster Tuncurry Hawks would win back-to-back Clayton Cup titles. In 1995, he would sign a Super League contract and was allocated to the new Hunter Mariners franchise ahead of the 1996 season. However, when Super League was banned from starting in 1997, he would join the Bulldogs, where he was set to replace the retiring Terry Lamb.

=== Canterbury-Bankstown Bulldogs ===
During the 1996 season, Hill was playing with the Bulldogs' junior squad where he was described as a "two iron with ears". He was elevated by head coach Chris Anderson, to make his first grade debut for Canterbury-Bankstown against South Sydney in round 18 of the 1996 ARL season scoring two tries in a 28–4 victory at the Sydney Football Stadium. He would play in five first grade matches for the Bulldogs, featuring on the winning side in all five occasions.

=== Hunter Mariners ===
With Super League commencing in 1997, Hill moved to the Hunter Mariners for the 1997 Super League season, completing his carpentry apprenticeship with teammate Robbie McCormack during the preseason. He would score a try in the Hunter Mariners final ever Super League match in round 18 against Cronulla-Sutherland at the Topper Stadium. Hill is one of just two players to have played in every game for the Mariners, including the 1997 World Club Championship final, which would prove to be the final Mariners game.

=== Melbourne Storm ===
Recruited by Melbourne, Hill was among several players from the club's inaugural season in 1998. He would miss Melbourne's 1999 NRL grand final win over the St. George Illawarra Dragons due to a knee reconstruction. Having won the 1999 Premiership, the Melbourne Storm travelled to England to contest the 2000 World Club Challenge against Super League Champions St. Helens, with Hill playing at five-eighth and scoring two tries in the victory.

Hill would play more than 170 matches for Melbourne, with his last match coming when he started at five-eighth in Melbourne's 2006 NRL Grand Final loss to the Brisbane Broncos.

=== Harlequins ===
Leaving at the end of that season, Hill moved to London to play for the Harlequins club of Super League, where he would play two seasons before retiring at the end of the 2008 season.

== Representative career ==
Hill was selected to represent Australia in the 2000 Anzac Test, coming off the bench in Australia's 52–0 whitewash of New Zealand. Following this selection, Hill would play for New South Wales in the 2000 State of Origin series. He would play all three games in NSW's 3–0 series victory.

At the end of the 2000 NRL season, Hill would be selected for the Australian squad for the 2000 Rugby League World Cup, scoring two tries in Australia's 66–10 win over Samoa in the quarter-finals. Hill was the starting lock in Australia's 40–20 win over New Zealand in the final. He would make three further appearances for Australia, with his final international match in 2004.

During his career, Hill also played four representative matches for NSW Country in the then annual City vs Country Origin match.

== Personal life ==
After retirement from professional rugby league, Hill would later be involved in a mentoring business for young rugby league athletes.
