= 2000 World Club Challenge =

Rugby League match

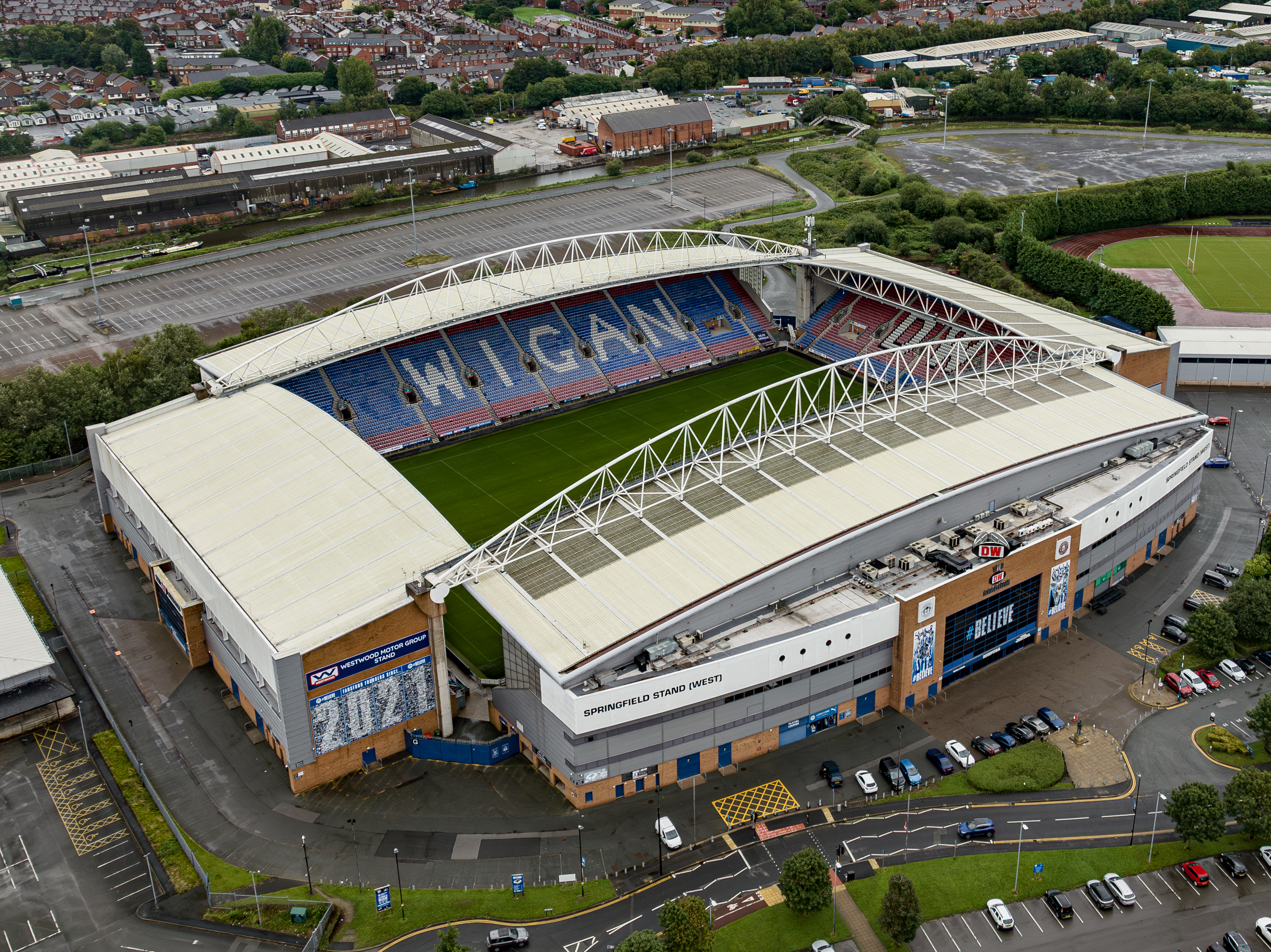
- The JJB Stadium hosted the match
St. Helens	Melbourne Storm
(SL)	(NRL)
6	44
	1	2	Total
ST H	2	4	6
MEL	20	24	44
- Date: 22 January 2000
- Stadium: JJB Stadium
- Location: Wigan, England
- Man of the Match: Brett Kimmorley
- Referee: Stuart Cummings (England)
- Attendance: 13,394

Broadcast partners
- Broadcasters: (United Kingdom) Sky Sports
- Commentators: Eddie Hemmings; Mike Stephenson

The 2000 World Club Challenge was contested by 1999 NRL season premiers, the Melbourne Storm and 1999's Super League IV champions, St. Helens. The match was played on 22 January at JJB Stadium, Wigan before a crowd of 13,394. The Melbourne Storm defeated St Helens 44 - 6. This was the first World Club Challenge since 1997 and the Super League war.

== Background ==
=== St Helens ===
The 1999 Super League Grand Final was the conclusive and championship-deciding game of the Super League IV season. The match was played between English clubs St. Helens and Bradford Bulls on Saturday 9 October 1999, at Old Trafford, Manchester, UK.

=== Melbourne Storm ===
The 1999 NRL Grand Final was the conclusive and premiership-deciding game of the 1999 NRL season. It was contested by the competition's two newest clubs: the Melbourne Storm, competing in only its second year (having finished the regular season in 3rd place); and the St George Illawarra Dragons, in their first year as a joint-venture club (having finished the regular season in 6th place), after both sides eliminated the rest of the top eight during the finals.

A new rugby league world record crowd of 107,999 was at Stadium Australia for the game. The attendance, which saw 67,142 more people attend than had done so for the 1998 NRL Grand Final at the Sydney Football Stadium, broke the record attendance for a Grand Final, eclipsing the previous record of 78,065 set in 1965. After trailing 0-14 at half time, the Melbourne Storm defeated the St George Illawarra Dragons 20-18.

== Venue ==
With the game set to be played in England, the Rugby Football League chose Wigan's home venue, the JJB Stadium which could hold 25,333, as the host venue in preference to St Helens' home ground of Knowsley Road which could only hold 17,500.

== Teams ==
Both teams were missing players following their 1999 victories. Anthony Sullivan, Vila Matautia and Keiron Cunningham were notable absences for St Helens through injury, with Melbourne missing their retired former captain Glenn Lazarus, and the injured Matt Geyer, Rodney Howe and Ben Roarty.

The match was played with four interchange players with a maximum of eight substitutions after agreement was reached between the two clubs. At the time the NRL competition had unlimited substitutions with four players on the interchange bench.

St Helens	Melbourne Storm

Team details
St Helens		Position	Melbourne Storm
Name	Number	Position	Number	Name
Paul Atcheson	1	Fullback	1	Robbie Ross
Chris Smith	2	Wing	2	Brad Watts
Paul Newlove	3	Centre	3	Aaron Moule
Kevin Iro	4	Centre	4	Tony Martin
Sean Hoppe	15	Wing	5	Marcus Bai
Tommy Martyn	20	Stand off/Five eighth	6	Scott Hill
Sean Long	7	Scrum half/Half back	7	Brett Kimmorley
Julian O'Neill	10	Prop forward	8	Wayne Evans
Paul Wellens	17	Hooker	9	Richard Swain
Sonny Nickle	12	Prop forward	10	Robbie Kearns (c)
Chris Joynt (c)	11	Second row	11	Paul Marquet
Bryan Henare	18	Second row	12	Stephen Kearney
Paul Sculthorpe	13	Loose forward/Lock forward	13	Matt Rua
Apollo Perelini	8	Interchange	14	Danny Williams
Fereti Tuilagi	14	Interchange	15	Tasesa Lavea
Anthony Stewart	19	Interchange	16	Russell Bawden
John Stankevitch	26	Interchange	18	Dane Morgan
(England) Ellery Hanley		Coach		(Australia) Chris Anderson

== Match summary ==
Melbourne started strongly with halfback Brett Kimmorley sending Aaron Moule into a gap in the St Helens defence to score a try in the fifth minute. The NRL premiers extending their lead to 10–0 in just the 11th minute following a try to Wayne Evans. St Helens lost centre Kevin Iro to a thigh injury during the first half, while captain Chris Joynt was feeling the effects of the flu and did not return after half time. The hosts first points coming via a penalty goal to Sean Long after a high tackle by Scott Hill.

The Storm would dominate the latter stages of the first half, scoring tries through Marcus Bai in the 30th minute, and Hill just before the break to take a 20–2 lead.

Storm forwards Danny Williams and Dane Morgan were forced to deny allegations of eye-gouging raised by Saints stand-off Tommy Martyn stemming from an incident in the 48th minute. Martyn lodged a formal complaint with referee Stuart Cummings, with both players later not charged by match officials.

Melbourne led by man of the match Brett Kimmorley ripped apart St Helens after the break, scoring a further try through Dane Morgan in his first game for the club, with Hill scoring his second try for the night, backing up some brilliant passing from Stephen Kearney and Robbie Ross. The fullback would score the first of his two tries soon after.

New Zealand international Sean Hoppe scored a late try for St Helens eight minutes from full time, but it was mere consolation, with Melbourne scoring their eighth try a few minutes later to take the final score to 44–6, the widest margin in the history of the previous editions of the World Club Challenge.

Despite the final margin, St Helens coach Ellery Hanley claimed after the match that Melbourne were "not a better side than us at all, although the scoreline says they were. We just didn't defend and stop their offloads." Melbourne coach Chris Anderson was quoted that he "expected a hard game. It was a new style of football for St Helens and they struggled."

=== Scoreboard ===
2000 World Club Challenge

Saturday, 22 January
18:00 GMT (UTC+0)

St. Helens	6 – 44	Melbourne Storm
Tries: 1 Hoppe 72'; Goals: 1 Long pen 20' (1/2)	1st: 2–20; 2nd: 4–24; Report	Tries: 8 Hill 39', 57'; Ross 66', 75'; Moule 5'; Evans 11'; Bai 30'; Morgan 50'; Goals: 6 Watts 11', 40', 51', 57', 66', 75' (6/8)

JJB Stadium, Wigan
Attendance: 13,394
Referee: Stuart Cummings (England)
Player of the Match: Brett Kimmorley
