= Aaron Moule =

Australian rugby league footballer

Personal information
- Born: 20 June 1977 (age 49) Redcliffe, Queensland, Australia

Playing information
- Height: 184 cm (6 ft 0 in)
- Weight: 93 kg (205 lb; 14 st 9 lb)
- Position: Centre
Club
Years	Team	Pld	T	G	FG	P
1997	South Queensland	9	3	0	0	12
1998–03	Melbourne Storm	104	58	0	0	232
2004–05	Widnes Vikings	29	12	0	0	48
2006–07	Salford City Reds	48	19	0	0	76
	Total	190	92	0	0	368

Aaron Moule (born 20 June 1977) is an Australian former professional rugby league footballer who played in the 1990s and 2000s. He played club football for the South Queensland Crushers and Melbourne Storm in Australasia's National Rugby League and Widnes Vikings and Salford City Reds in the Super League.

== Early life ==
Moule grew up in the Redcliffe, Queensland area of Brisbane, playing junior rugby league with Redcliffe Dolphins. He was later captain of the Sunshine Coast schoolboys representative team, leading the team to second place in the state carnival.

== Playing career ==
Moule made his first grade rugby league debut for South Queensland Crushers in the 1997 ARL season, winning the club's rookie of the year honour, before joining Melbourne Storm for the 1998 NRL season.

Moule played at centre for Melbourne in their 1999 NRL Grand Final victory against the St. George Illawarra Dragons. Having won the 1999 Premiership, Melbourne Storm contested in the 2000 World Club Challenge against Super League Champions St Helens R.F.C., with Moule playing at centre and scoring a try in the victory.

A consistent, but combative player, Moule was the leading try scorer for Melbourne Storm in 2001 and 2002.

Moule stunned Melbourne by announcing his retirement from the NRL in April 2003, revealing that a succession of injuries had taken away his enjoyment of the game. "At 25, three shoulder reconstructions, knee surgery and a severe case of osteitis pubis head my list of injuries," he said. "Put simply, the passion to play isn't there any more." After sitting out the rest of 2003, in November Moule had agreed to return to rugby league with Widnes Vikings.

Moule retired from the professional game at the end of the 2007 Super League season.

== Career highlights and honours ==
- First Grade Debut:

1997 – Round 11, South Queensland v Western Suburbs Magpies at Campbelltown Stadium, 18 May

- Rookie of the Year:

1997 – South Queensland Crushers

- Premierships:

1999 – Melbourne Storm

- World Club Challenge Champions

2000 – Melbourne Storm
