= Chris Essex =

Australian rugby league footballer

Playing information
- Position: Second-row, Lock
Club
Years	Team	Pld	T	G	FG	P
2000	Melbourne Storm	1	0	0	0	0
- Source: RLP As of 17 December 2020

Chris Essex is an Australian former professional rugby league footballer who played in the 2000s for the Melbourne Storm.

== Playing career ==
Educated at Hendra Secondary College, Essex came off the bench for the Redcliffe Dolphins in their Grand Final win over the Easts Tigers. In 1998, he represented the Queensland Residents team. In 1999, he came off the bench in the Dolphins' Grand Final loss to the Burleigh Bears.

In 2000, Essex joined the Norths Devils, the Melbourne Storm's Queensland Cup feeder club. In round 16 of the 2000 NRL season, Essex made his NRL debut for the Storm, coming off the bench in their 16–12 win over the Brisbane Broncos. He was only told to grab a jersey and get out on the field minutes before the match after an injury to Melbourne forward John Lomax.

Following his time at Norths, Essex would be captain of the ill-fated Brothers-Valleys club in the 2002 Brisbane Rugby League season. He would retire from rugby league during that season, but did return when the club returned to play in the Queensland Cup in 2004.

== Personal life ==
Essex is the founder of pet food company Big Dog Pet Foods.
