= Setariki Rakabula =

Fijian rugby league footballer

Personal information
- Born: 16 May 1973; Fiji
- Died: 29 May 2017 (aged 44); Bookara, Western Australia

Playing information
- Position: Centre
Representative
Years	Team	Pld	T	G	FG	P
2000	Fiji	1	0	0	0	0

Setariki Rakabula (16 May 1973 – 29 May 2017) was a Fijian rugby league footballer who represented Fiji in the 2000 World Cup.

Rakabula was contracted to the Melbourne Storm after the 1999 NRL season, but broke his collarbone in November 1999 after falling from his bicycle. He did not play any NRL games while with Melbourne, instead playing for Norths Devils in the Queensland Cup.

He would play in the Fiji team that lost to England 66-10 in the 2000 Rugby League World Cup.

In 2005, Rakabula would play in a friendly international for Fiji against the Cook Islands, scoring a try in a 20-all draw at Coffs Harbour.

Rakabula would later move to Geraldton, working as a scaffolder.

Rakabula died in a motor vehicle accident in May 2017. His former rugby club Geraldton Tiger Sharks play an annual match against Perth Bayswater in his honour.
