= Danny Williams (rugby league, born 1973) =

Ireland international rugby league footballer

Personal information
- Full name: Daniel Williams
- Born: 4 September 1973 (age 53) Hornsby, New South Wales, Australia

Playing information
- Height: 185 cm (6 ft 1 in)
- Weight: 97 kg (15 st 4 lb)
- Position: Second-row
Club
Years	Team	Pld	T	G	FG	P
1993–97	North Sydney Bears	66	3	0	0	12
1998–04	Melbourne Storm	146	24	1	0	98
2005–06	London Broncos	42	4	0	0	16
	Total	254	31	1	0	126
Representative
Years	Team	Pld	T	G	FG	P
2000	Ireland	4	0	0	0	0

Danny Williams (born 4 September 1973) is a former Ireland international rugby league footballer who played in the 1990s and 2000s. He retired from playing at the end of 2006's Super League XI following two seasons with London Broncos/Harlequins RL. He is an Ireland international.

== Early life ==
Williams was born in Hornsby, New South Wales, Australia.

Williams played junior rugby league with the Woy Woy Roosters, a highlight during that time was playing under 12's, and remaining undefeated the whole season and winning the premiership. He was educated at Umina High School, where he represented 1991 Australian Schoolboys.

== Playing career ==
=== North Sydney ===
Williams made his first grade debut with North Sydney Bears in 1993. He made a total of 66 appearances for the club including the 1996 preliminary final defeat against St George, scoring 3 tries and 1 goal. While with the Bears, Williams was part of back-to-back reserve grade premierships in 1992-93.

=== Melbourne ===
After his spell at Norths, Williams joined the newly formed Melbourne Storm in 1998. The following season Williams came off the bench in the Storm's 20-18 1999 NRL Grand Final victory over the St George Illawarra Dragons. Having won the 1999 Premiership, the Melbourne Storm traveled to England to contest the 2000 World Club Challenge against Super League Champions St Helens, with Williams playing from the interchange bench in the victory.

At the end of the 2000 NRL season, Williams represented Ireland at the 2000 Rugby League World Cup, by virtue of his grandfather's Irish heritage.

On 17 July 2004, during round 19 of the 2004 NRL season, Danny Williams was sent off for a coward-punch on Wests Tigers' player Mark O'Neill. Williams defended the incident, using four medical experts to argue on his behalf that he was suffering post traumatic amnesia when the incident occurred, which he claims was the result of a high tackle by O'Neill just prior to the incident. Despite Williams' claim he was suspended for eighteen weeks by the NRL Judiciary. Even if Williams decided to head overseas the ban would still apply. After the decision was made Williams stated that he was "obviously disappointed with the outcome". It was the longest suspension in Australian rugby league since Steve Linnane was suspended for twenty weeks for eye-gouging in 1987. In total he made 146 appearances for the club but was released after his ban, and signed for English club Harlequins of Super League.

=== Harlequins ===
After signing for the Harlequins, Williams missed the opening rounds of the 2005 season following the suspension given to him by the NRL Judiciary. He made his début for the club over the Easter period in 2005, and retired from playing at the end of the following year.

== Personal life ==
On 2 November 2022, Williams avoided jail after being previously charged for glassing a woman at a Sydney pub. William had originally pleaded guilty to assault occasioning actual bodily harm during the incident on 1 October 2022. It was alleged that Williams had thrown a glass back at the woman before smashing a glass on the back of her head, leaving her with a cut, although she didn't go to hospital. Williams then allegedly fled the bar but was later found and arrested. Williams was handed a $1000 fine and an 18-month correction order.
