= Tasesa Lavea =

NZ & Samoa dual-code rugby international player

- Lavea at a signing session in 2007
- Born: Tasesa James Lavea Levi; 10 January 1980 (age 46) Taihape, New Zealand
- Height: 1.75 m (5 ft 9 in)
- Weight: 87 kg (13 st 10 lb)
- School: Papatoetoe High School; St Kentigern College

Rugby union career
- Position(s): Fly-half, Centre
Senior career
Years	Team	Apps	(Points)
2009–2011	Clermont	16	(10)
2011–2012	Sale	2	(0)
Provincial / State sides
Years	Team	Apps	(Points)
2003–2007	Auckland	36	(35)
2008–2009	Counties Manukau	17	(13)
2011	Counties Manukau	6	(16)
Super Rugby
Years	Team	Apps	(Points)
2004–2006	Blues	19	(30)
2007–2008	Chiefs	7	(20)
2009	Blues	4	(0)
International career
Years	Team	Apps	(Points)
2010–2011	Samoa	7	(3)
Coaching career
- Years: Team
- 2012–: Saint Kentigern College
- Rugby league career

Playing information
- Position: Stand-off
Club
Years	Team	Pld	T	G	FG	P
1999–01	Melbourne Storm	44				226
2002	Northern Eagles	5				19
	Total	49	0	0	0	245
Representative
Years	Team	Pld	T	G	FG	P
2000–01	New Zealand	4				48

Tasesa James Lavea (born 10 January 1980) is a New Zealand rugby union coach and former professional rugby league and rugby union footballer. He is of Samoan and Māori descent and heritage, and he coaches the 1st XV for Saint Kentigern College.

== Early life ==
Although born in Taihape, Lavea grew up in Auckland and was educated at Papatoetoe High School, then St Kentigern College where he played for three seasons in the 1st XV. He was an age-group representative between the ages of 14 and 16, and played for both the Auckland and New Zealand Secondary Schools teams in 1998. He also excelled in cricket.

== Career ==
Lavea played fly-half for the Blues in Super Rugby from 2004 to 2006. He also played at inside centre for the Chiefs in the 2007 and 2008 seasons. In 2009 he rejoined the Blues.

At provincial level, Lavea played for Auckland in the National Provincial Championship from 2003 through to 2007. He joined Counties Manukau in 2008.

He played for French Top 14 team ASM Clermont Auvergne between 2009 and 2011. He was a replacement in the final as Clermont won the Top 14 title in 2009–10.

== Switch to Rugby League ==
Following secondary school, Lavea played for the Junior All Blacks and was then scouted by Melbourne Storm (despite never having played rugby league until signing), switching codes to play in Australia. Having won the 1999 Premiership, the Melbourne Storm travelled to England to contest the 2000 World Club Challenge against Super League Champions St Helens R.F.C., with Lavea playing from the interchange bench in the victory. Thanks to his prodigious goal-kicking skills, in 2000 he was the Melbourne Storm's leading points scorer (190 points) and was named the NRL Rookie of the Year.

After a quieter second season, in 2002 Lavea left Melbourne for the Northern Eagles but was hampered by injury and hardly featured in the team.

=== Test Matches and Rugby League World Cup ===
Lavea was a member of New Zealand's 2000 World Cup squad. Between 2000 and 2001, he played 4 test matches for the Kiwis in his usual rugby league position of stand-off. In the match against Cook Islands on 2 November 2000, Lavea's haul of 32 points (2 tries and 12 goals) broke the previous Kiwi record of 26 points (set by Henry Paul).

== Return to Rugby Union ==
Lavea returned to New Zealand in 2003 and switched codes once again to play rugby union, signing with Auckland. His NPC debut was in that year, against Waikato. He then made his Blues debut in 2004 against the Reds and was part of the Blues for three seasons. In 2007, Lavea joined the Chiefs through the player draft, with whom he played two seasons, and in 2008 moved provinces from Auckland to Counties. In 2009, he returned to the Blues, however he made only four more appearances for the side in his final season of Super Rugby. He played a final season for Counties in the Air New Zealand Cup before moving to France.

Following a mixed Super 14 season in 2006, Lavea was named in the New Zealand Māori rugby union team. Due to an injury sustained in club rugby, he had to withdraw from the team before the Churchill Cup tournament even began. The New Zealand Māori went on to take the title. Lavea was again selected as Auckland's principal fly-half as the province prepared to defend its Air New Zealand Cup title.

In September 2006, Lavea was named in the Pacific Islanders rugby union team (representing Samoa) to tour the United Kingdom and Ireland in November 2006. When the Pacific Islanders squad left for the UK on 2 November 2006, Lavea was not part of the squad. He withdrew from the team because Ian Foster, head coach of the Chiefs, requested for him to stay in New Zealand for pre-season training.

Lavea's played for Auckland in the 2007 Air NZ Cup, at the conclusion of which he moved to Counties Manukau. Since

Lavea signed for Clermont Auvergne in 2009. He mostly plays as a second choice at fly-half behind Brock James. He was called by Samoa national team for the first time in November 2010.

== Statistics ==
Super Rugby Caps: 26 (Blues 19, Chiefs 7)
Super Rugby Points: 50 (7 tries, 3 conversions, 3 penalties)
Blues: 30 (3 tries, 3 conversions, 3 penalties)
Chiefs: 20 (4 tries)

Blues Debut: 2004 vs Reds
Chiefs Debut: 2007 vs Brumbies

Provincial Caps: 35
Provincial Points: 35 (7 tries)

Auckland Debut: 2003 vs Waikato

Rugby League Test Caps: 4
Rugby League Test Points: 48 (3 tries, 18 goals)

== See also ==
- 2007 Air New Zealand Cup
