= Richard Swain =

New Zealand international rugby league footballer

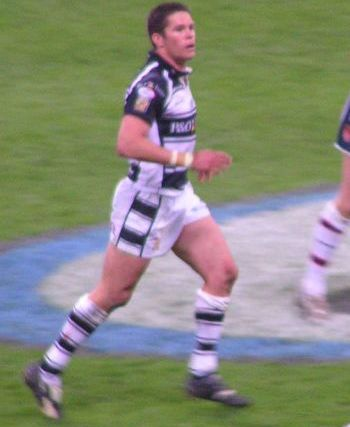
- Swain playing for Hull in 2007

Personal information
- Full name: Richard Gregory Swain
- Born: 2 July 1975 (age 51) Tamworth, New South Wales, Australia

Playing information
- Height: 179 cm (5 ft 10 in)
- Weight: 89 kg (14 st 0 lb)
- Position: Hooker
Club
| Years | Team | Pld | T | G | FG | P |
|---|---|---|---|---|---|---|
| 1997 | Hunter Mariners | 13 | 0 | 4 | 0 | 8 |
| 1998–02 | Melbourne Storm | 132 | 17 | 12 | 0 | 92 |
| 2003 | Brisbane Broncos | 21 | 0 | 2 | 0 | 4 |
| 2004–07 | Hull FC | 94 | 5 | 0 | 0 | 20 |
| | Total | 260 | 22 | 18 | 0 | 124 |
Representative
| Years | Team | Pld | T | G | FG | P |
| 1999–03 | New Zealand | 20 | 4 | 16 | 0 | 30 |

Richard Swain (born 2 July 1975) is a New Zealand former professional rugby league footballer who played in the 1990s and 2000s. A New Zealand international hooker, he played club football in Australia for the Hunter Mariners, Melbourne Storm (with whom he won the 1999 NRL premiership) and Brisbane Broncos and in England for Hull FC.

== Early years ==
Swain was born and raised in Tamworth, New South Wales, Australia, he went to Farrer Memorial Agricultural High School, Tamworth the same school as former Canberra Raiders captain Alan Tongue and Tom Learoyd-Lahrs.

== Playing career ==
=== Australia ===
Swain made his first grade début in 1997, playing for the new Hunter Mariners club. With the demise of the club at the end of the year he moved south, joining the Melbourne Storm. He was one of the last players signed by the Storm ahead of their first season.

Known for his durability, Swain never missed a game for the Melbourne Storm from the club's first ever match in round 1, 1998 up until his final game for the club in round 26, 2002. Swain declared his eligibility for New Zealand in 1999 and was selected for the New Zealand national rugby league team for that year's ANZAC Test.

Swain played at hooker in 1999 NRL Grand Final victory over St. George Illawarra. He was selected for the New Zealand team to compete in the end of season 1999 Rugby League Tri-Nations tournament. In the final against Australia he played at hooker in the Kiwis' 22–20 loss. Having won the 1999 Premiership, the Melbourne Storm traveled to England to contest the 2000 World Club Challenge against Super League Champions St Helens R.F.C., with Swain playing at hooker in the victory.

Swain went on to play in 19 tests for New Zealand, including at the 2000 World Cup.

Swain was named the Storm's player of the year in 2001. Swain also the first player in the National Rugby League to top 1,000 tackles in a season (2001) and was also Super League's "top tackler" in 2004 with 907 tackles for Hull. He went on the 2002 New Zealand rugby league tour of Great Britain and France and was the goal-kicker and leading point-scorer of the tour. Swain spent 2003 with the Brisbane Broncos before joining Hull F.C. for four years in the Super League.

=== England ===
Swain played at hooker and was a major part in Hull F.C. winning the 2005 Challenge Cup, as it was his last gasp charge-down of Kevin Sinfield's drop-goal attempt that ended the Leeds Rhinos' last chance of taking the game to extra-time. Kevin Sinfield was named Lance Todd Trophy winner 5-minutes from time, when at the time Leeds Rhinos were winning. Hull F.C. reached the 2006 Super League Grand final to be contested against St. Helens and Swain played at hooker in his side's 4-26 loss. Swain retired halfway through the 2007 season due to a back injury.
