= Brett Kimmorley =

Australia international rugby league footballer

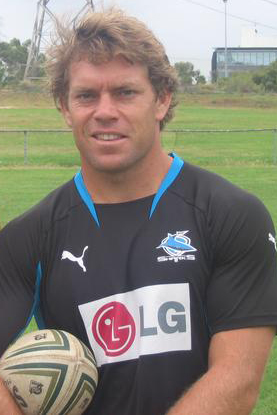

Personal information
- Full name: Brett Kimmorley
- Born: 15 September 1976 (age 50) Belmont, New South Wales, Australia
- Height: 172 cm (5 ft 8 in)
- Weight: 91 kg (14 st 5 lb)

Playing information
- Position: Halfback
Club
Years	Team	Pld	T	G	FG	P
1995–96	Newcastle Knights	6	1	0	0	4
1997	Hunter Mariners	10	2	4	0	16
1998–00	Melbourne Storm	79	27	27	3	165
2001	Northern Eagles	26	11	0	0	44
2002–08	Cronulla Sharks	140	33	165	5	467
2009–10	Canterbury Bulldogs	46	8	0	3	35
	Total	307	82	196	11	731
Representative
Years	Team	Pld	T	G	FG	P
1997	Australia (SL)	2	0	0	0	0
1999–05	Australia	20	5	1	1	31
2000–10	New South Wales	10	0	0	0	0
2001–10	Country NSW	5	1	3	0	10
2005	Prime Minister's XIII	1	0	0	0	0

Coaching information
Club
Years	Team	Gms	W	D	L	W%
2022	Wests Tigers	12	1	0	11	8
2023–25	Wests Tigers NRLW	19	4	0	15	21
2026	Manly Sea Eagles NSW CUP	21	2	0	19	10
	Total	52	7	0	45	13
- Source: As of 13 December 2023
- Relatives: Craig Kimmorley (brother)

Brett "Noddy" Kimmorley (born 15 September 1976) is an Australian rugby league coach and former professional rugby league footballer who played in the 1990s, 2000s, & early 2010s. A New South Wales interstate and Australian international representative halfback, he last played for the Canterbury-Bankstown Bulldogs of the NRL. He previously played for five other clubs: Newcastle Knights, Hunter Mariners, Melbourne Storm, Northern Eagles and the Cronulla-Sutherland Sharks. Kimmorley also represented Country NSW four times and New South Wales ten times as well as playing 15 times for his country including the 2000 World Cup. He also played two Super League Tests. He retired at the end of the 2010 NRL season.

== Early life ==
Brett played early football in the backyard with his brother, Craig, and then for the Lakes United Seagulls and Valentine-Eleebana Red Devils. His father Des Kimmorley played for Lakes United and also played representative football for NSW Country and NSW. Kimmorley was educated at Belmont High School, where he also represented 1994 Australian Schoolboys.

== Playing career ==
=== 1990s ===
Kimmorley made his first grade debut for the Newcastle Knights against Manly on 21 July 1995 at Energy Australia Stadium (then known as Marathon Stadium). In place of the injured Andrew Johns, Kimmorley got his first try in his second ever game. He would score two tries for the Knights in the club's 1995 reserve grade premiership victory.

After limited opportunities in first-grade at his favoured half-back position with the Knights (because of Andrew Johns), Kimmorley opted to sign for newly formed Super League club the Hunter Mariners who were also based out of Newcastle midway through the 1997 split season. Throughout 1997 the Mariners managed to make a seven win and reach the final of the 1997 World Club Championship. Kimmorley was the Mariners' only player selected to represent Australia in the three-test series against Great Britain at the end of the season.

With the shutting down of Super League in 1998 the Mariners were subsequently disbanded and with the newly formed National Rugby League starting up, Kimmorley was yet again on the move. He (along with several Mariners teammates) moved to newly formed entity the Melbourne Storm on a three-year deal. He played every game for the Storm in the 1998 season. His most memorable season for the Storm came in 1999 when he was named the club's player of the year He played at halfback for the Storm in the 1999 NRL Grand Final against the St George Illawarra Dragons. Melbourne claimed their maiden premiership, with Kimmorley leading a spirited Storm comeback and setting up the match-winning try with a chip-kick to earn the Clive Churchill medal for best on-ground. Kimmorley was selected for the Australian team to compete in the end of season 1999 Rugby League Tri-Nations tournament. In the final against New Zealand he played at halfback in the Kangaroos' 22–20 victory.

=== 2000s ===
Having won the 1999 Premiership, the Melbourne Storm travelled to England to contest the 2000 World Club Challenge against Super League Champions St Helens R.F.C., with Kimmorley playing at halfback in the victory. In 2000, Kimmorley made his State of Origin debut for New South Wales, helping the Blues to a clean sweep, and keeping Johns on the bench for Games II and III. The following year he left Victoria for the Northern Eagles. He had an unhappy season, however, and when the merged entity split at the end of the season, he decided to follow his former Melbourne Storm coach Chris Anderson to the Cronulla-Sutherland Sharks (the club where he would spend the majority of his career, playing seven seasons between 2002–08)

In his first season with his new club he somewhat flourished, setting a new club record for most points in a game against his former club, Newcastle, and led the Sharks to the preliminary final, although they lost (to eventual runners-up New Zealand Warriors). The season was marred by controversy as Chris Anderson dropped 2001 Dally M Medallist and club favourite Preston Campbell from the halfback position to accommodate Kimmorley, which resulted in Sharks fans' lukewarm reception of the Test halfback.

With the new season in 2003 looking promising, Kimmorley was awarded the captaincy of the team over David Peachey and was rewarded with a new five-year deal. At the end of the 2003 NRL season, he went on the 2003 Kangaroo tour of Great Britain and France, helping Australia to victory over Great Britain. Kimmorley was pivotal to Australia's whitewashing with last-minute field goals to secure the first two games in the three game series.

2004 was a disappointing season for Kimmorley, who failed to take his club to the finals for a second consecutive season. He was also plagued with several injuries which caused him to miss the annual State of Origin series fixtures, although he was selected in the Australian team to go and compete in the end of season 2004 Rugby League Tri-Nations tournament. In the final against Great Britain Kimmorley played at half back in the Kangaroos' 44–4 victory.

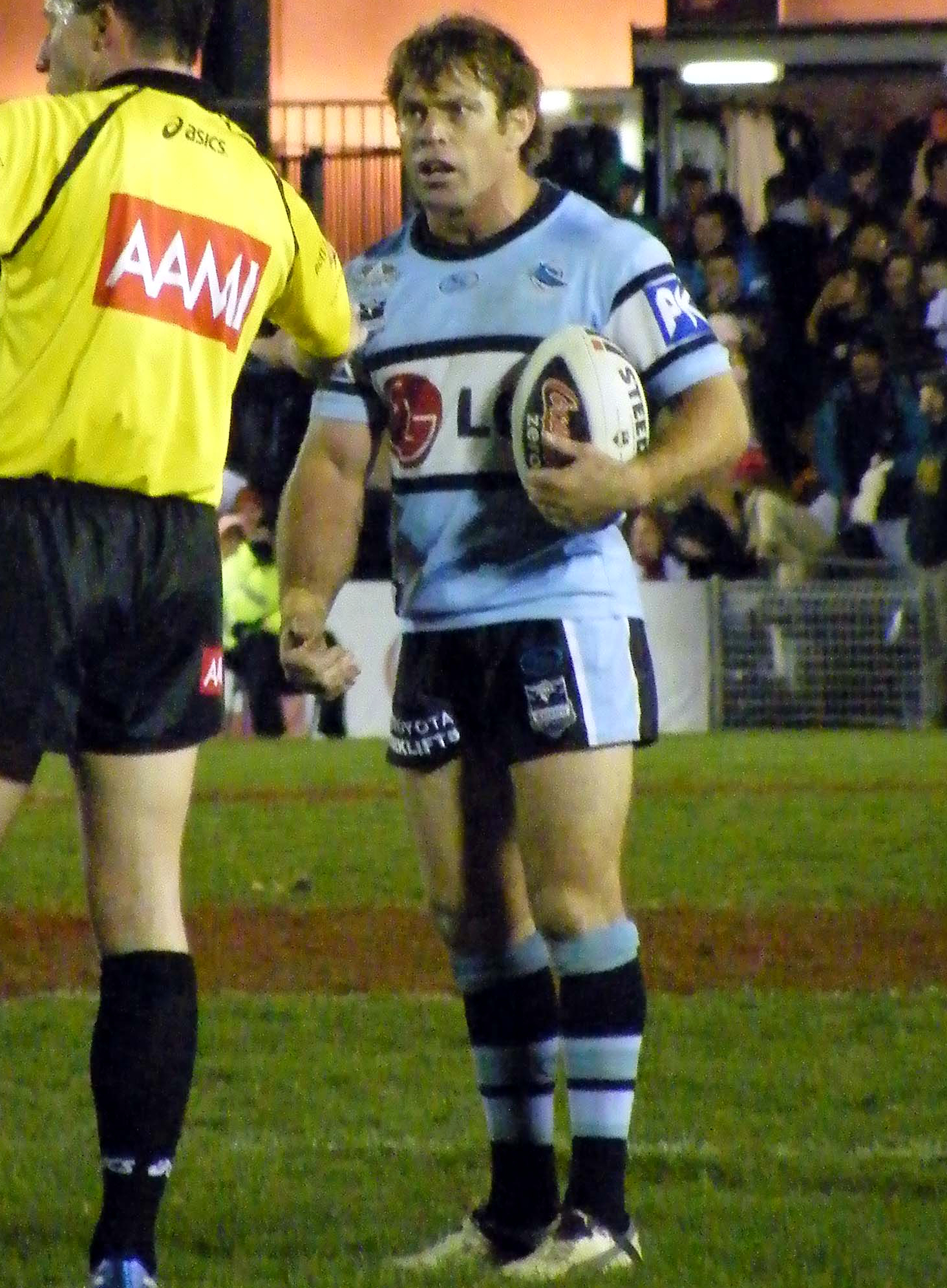
Kimmorley in 2008

The start of 2005 looked extremely promising for the club, with Cronulla and Kimmorley winning the first 6 games in a row to be on top of the NRL Ladder. However, after Kimmorley's selection for New South Wales Rugby League team in the first State of Origin match, in which he threw the fateful intercept ball to hand Queensland a victory, his confidence was seemingly shattered and his club form suffered badly. Only Cronulla's excellent first half of the season and favourable results prevented them from falling out of finals contention.

2006 was an unhappy one for Kimmorley, failing to regain his spot at halfback for both representative teams (New South Wales and Australia) the Sharks struggled to maintain their strong start to the season, plummeting from 2nd place on the ladder to lose 10 games in a row and finish 12th on the ladder.

In 2007, Kimmorley's chance for success improved mainly from the signing of new coach Ricky Stuart a former representative halfback himself. Kimmorley was selected as halfback for the 2007 New South Wales State of Origin team for games 2 and 3, after Jarrod Mullen was dropped due to injury.

Kimmorley agreed to move to the Canterbury-Bankstown Bulldogs on a two-year deal from the 2009 season. Kimmorley played a senior role at the club. Kimmorley was also in line for captain of the Bulldogs. On 26 August 2010, he announced his retirement from the NRL effective at the end of the season.

=== Playing statistics ===
- Played over 300 career first grade games with six clubs
- Has scored over 700 points including 82 career tries

== Personal accolades ==
Clive Churchill Medal: 1999

Dally M Halfback of The Year: 2000

== Coaching career ==
Following his retirement, Kimmorley signed on as an assistant coach with the Bulldogs for 2011–12. In December 2012, he announced his move to the Canberra Raiders, signing a two-year deal, as David Furner's right-hand man. Kimmorley was head coach of the Wests Tigers Under 20s in 2015, making the second week of the finals. He departed the club shortly afterwards.

In 2016, he would take up the head coach role of the Western Suburbs Red Devils getting them to the Grand Final in his maiden season. They lost 28-16 in the Grand Final to the Dapto Canaries who were captain-coached by former NRL player Michael Henderson (rugby league). In his second and final season with the club they finished 3rd in the regular season and did not make the final.

In 2022, following the termination of Michael Maguire at the Wests Tigers, Kimmorley was named as interim coach for the rest of the season. In round 20, Kimmorley earned his first win as interim head coach with a shock 32-18 victory over Brisbane. In round 23, Wests were beaten 72-6 by the Sydney Roosters which became the clubs heaviest ever defeat.

On 2 September 2025, the Tigers announced that Kimmorley would end his tenure as the NRLW coach.

In October 2025, Manly announced that Kimmorley would join the coaching staff.

In September 2026, it was announced Kimmorley had left the club for personal reasons after winning 2 games for the season.

== Media career ==
After retiring, Kimmorley joined Fox Sports as a commentator. As of 2017, Kimmorley normally commentated 1-2 matches per round as a sideline commentator. He also works as an NRL reporter for the Seven Network.

== Personal life ==
Brett Kimmorley's wife, Sharnie, had a brain tumour and died on 23 March 2017.
