= List of Melbourne Storm players =

This article lists all rugby league footballers who have played first-grade NRL games for the Melbourne Storm.

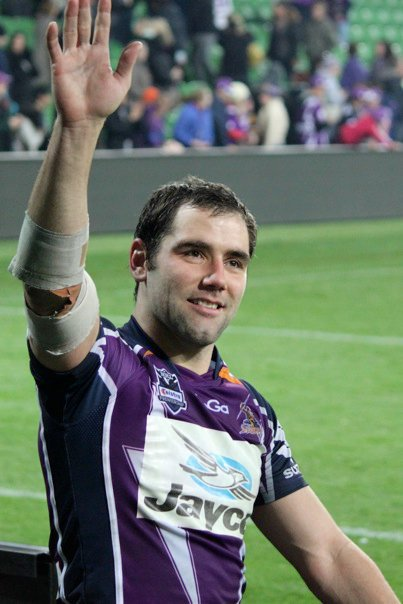
Cameron Smith made a record 430 appearances for Melbourne from 2002 to 2020.

Notes:

- Debut: Players are listed in order of player cap number as shown on Melbourne Storm honour board.
- Appearances: NRL games for Melbourne Storm only. This not a total of their career games and does not include World Club Challenge games. E.g. Marcus Bai has played a career total of 254 first grade games but of those 144 were at Melbourne.
- Previous club: refers to the previous first-grade rugby league club (NRL or Super League) the player played at and does not refer to any junior club, rugby union or rugby league club he was signed to but never played at.

== List of players ==
The statistics in this table are current as the end of the 2026 NRL season.

Key to list
Member of National Rugby League Hall of Fame
Players currently contracted for 2027

Cap No.	Name	Nationality	Storm career	Debut round	Previous club	Position	Appearances	Tries	Goals	Field goals	Points
1.	Robbie Ross	(Australia)	1998–2003	Rd. 1	Hunter Mariners	Fullback	89	53	0	0	212
2.	Craig Smith	(Australia)	1998–1999	Rd. 1	North Sydney Bears	Wing	20	3	61	0	134
3.	Aaron Moule	(Australia)	1998–2003	Rd. 1	South Queensland Crushers	Centre	104	58	0	0	232
4.	Paul Bell	(Australia)	1998–1999	Rd. 1	Perth Reds	Centre	39	12	0	0	48
5.	Marcus Bai	(Papua New Guinea)	1998–2003	Rd. 1	Gold Coast Chargers	Wing	144	70	1	0	282
6.	Scott Hill	(Australia)	1998–2006	Rd. 1	Hunter Mariners	Five-eighth	177	46	1	0	186
7.	Brett Kimmorley	(Australia)	1998–2000	Rd. 1	Hunter Mariners	Halfback	79	27	26	3	163
8.	Rodney Howe	(Australia)	1998–2004	Rd. 1	Perth Reds	Prop	106	4	0	0	16
9.	Danny Williams	(Australia) (Republic of Ireland)	1998–2004	Rd. 1	North Sydney Bears	Second-row	146	24	1	0	98
10.	Robbie Kearns	(Australia)	1998–2005	Rd. 1	Perth Reds	Prop	169	18	0	0	72
11.	Paul Marquet	(Australia)	1998–2000	Rd. 1	Hunter Mariners	Second-row	79	9	0	0	36
12.	Ben Roarty	(Australia)	1998–2001	Rd. 1	Debut	Second-row	94	18	0	0	72
13.	Tawera Nikau	(New Zealand)	1998–1999	Rd. 1	Cronulla-Sutherland Sharks	Lock	53	8	0	0	32
14.	Glenn Lazarus	(Australia)	1998–1999	Rd. 1	Brisbane Broncos	Prop	44	2	1	0	10
15.	Richard Swain	(Australia) (New Zealand)	1998–2002	Rd. 1	Hunter Mariners	Hooker	132	17	12	0	92
16.	Russell Bawden	(Australia)	1998–2001	Rd. 1	Brisbane Broncos	Second-row	101	23	0	0	92
17.	John Carlaw	(Australia)	1998	Rd. 1	Hunter Mariners	Centre	24	6	0	0	24
18.	Matt Geyer	(Australia)	1998–2008	Rd. 2	Perth Reds	Wing, Five-eighth	262	113	105	0	662
19.	Wayne Evans	(Australia)	1998–2000	Rd. 4	Perth Reds	Second-row	32	2	0	0	8
20.	Ben Anderson	(Australia)	1998–1999	Rd. 4	Debut	Five-eighth	17	1	0	0	4
21.	Tony Martin	(Australia)	1998–2000	Rd. 7	London Broncos	Centre	69	20	8	0	96
22.	Anthony Bonus	(Australia)	1998	Rd. 13	Parramatta Eels	Prop	1	0	0	0	0
23.	Wade Fenton	(Australia)	1998, 2000	Rd. 13	Debut	Prop	5	0	0	0	0
24.	John Wilshere	(Papua New Guinea)	1998	Rd. 14	Perth Reds	Wing	1	0	3	0	6
25.	Daniel Frame	(Australia)	1998	Rd. 15	Debut	Lock	7	0	0	0	0
26.	Matt Rua	(New Zealand) (Cook Islands)	1998–2002, 2007	Rd. 16	Debut	Second-row	101	14	0	0	56
27.	Tristan Brady-Smith	(Australia)	1998	Rd. 20	Perth Reds	Wing	3	1	0	0	4
28.	Stephen Kearney	(New Zealand)	1999–2004	Rd. 1	New Zealand Warriors	Second-row	139	20	0	0	80
29.	Aseri Laing	(Fiji)	1999	Rd. 11	Western Suburbs Magpies	Wing	5	1	0	0	4
30.	Tasesa Lavea	(New Zealand) (Samoa)	1999–2001	Rd. 13	Debut	Five-eighth	44	8	97	0	226
31.	Brad Watts	(Australia)	1999–2001	Rd. 16	Debut	Fullback	36	12	11	0	70
32.	Brett O'Farrell	(Australia)	1999–2001	Rd. 18	Debut	Prop	20	0	0	0	0
33.	John Lomax	(New Zealand)	2000	Rd. 7	North Queensland Cowboys	Prop	3	0	0	0	0
34.	Fifita Moala	(Tonga)	2000–2004	Rd. 13	Debut	Wing	39	20	0	0	80
35.	Brook Martin	(Australia)	2000	Rd. 14	Debut	Wing	1	0	0	0	0
36.	Kevin Carmichael	(Australia)	2000	Rd. 14	South Queensland Crushers	Halfback	3	0	0	0	0
37.	Glen Turner	(New Zealand)	2000, 2003–2005	Rd. 14	Debut	Second-row	56	6	0	0	24
38.	Peter Robinson	(Australia)	2000–2005	Rd. 14	Debut	Second-row	75	10	0	0	40
39.	Dane Morgan	(Australia)	2000	Rd. 14	North Sydney Bears	Second-row	1	0	0	0	0
40.	Chris Essex	(Australia)	2000	Rd. 16	Debut	Prop	1	0	0	0	0
41.	Brenton Pomery	(Australia)	2000–2001	Rd. 23	Wests Tigers	Prop	7	0	0	0	0
42.	Junior Langi	(New Zealand)	2001–2003	Rd. 1	St. George Illawarra Dragons	Centre	34	6	0	0	24
43.	Matt Orford	(Australia)	2001–2005	Rd. 1	Northern Eagles	Halfback	120	52	333	3	877
44.	Steven Bell	(Australia)	2001–2005	Rd. 1	Debut	Centre	107	63	0	0	252
45.	Paul Whatuira	(New Zealand) (Cook Islands)	2001	Rd. 4	New Zealand Warriors	Centre	6	2	0	0	8
46.	Henry Perenara	(New Zealand)	2001–2002	Rd. 5	New Zealand Warriors	Lock	33	8	0	0	32
47.	Paul Sheedy	(Australia) (Philippines)	2001	Rd. 14	Debut	Fullback	2	0	0	0	0
48.	Semi Tadulala	(Fiji)	2001–2003	Rd. 24	Debut	Wing	16	6	0	0	24
49.	Ian Sibbit	(England)	2002	Rd. 1	Warrington Wolves	Second-row	20	3	0	0	12
50.	Shane Walker	(Australia)	2002	Rd. 1	Wests Tigers	Prop	18	0	0	0	0
51.	Mitchell Sargent	(Australia)	2002–2003	Rd. 1	Debut	Prop	35	3	1	0	14
52.	William Leyshon	(Australia)	2002	Rd. 1	Northern Eagles	Lock	22	6	1	0	26
53.	Michael Russo	(Australia) (Italy)	2002	Rd. 2	Debut	Second-row	9	2	0	0	8
54.	Marty Turner	(New Zealand)	2002–2003	Rd. 3	Debut	Halfback	3	0	7	0	14
55.	Cameron Smith	(Australia)	2002–2020	Rd. 5	Debut	Hooker	430	48	1295	4	2786
56.	Kirk Reynoldson	(Australia)	2002–2004	Rd. 7	Debut	Second-row	63	6	0	0	24
57.	Keith Mason	(England) (Wales)	2002–2003	Rd. 11	Wakefield Trinity Wildcats	Prop	4	0	0	0	0
58.	Billy Slater	(Australia)	2003–2018	Rd. 1	Debut	Fullback	319	190	0	0	760
59.	David Kidwell	(New Zealand)	2003–2006	Rd. 1	Sydney Roosters	Second-row	103	18	0	0	72
60.	Dallas Johnson	(Australia)	2003–2009	Rd. 1	Debut	Lock	157	12	0	0	48
61.	Jake Webster	(Australia) (New Zealand)	2003–2006	Rd. 2	Debut	Wing	49	28	0	0	112
62.	Ryan Hoffman	(Australia)	2003–2010, 2012–2014, 2018	Rd. 6	Debut	Second-row	265	61	0	0	244
63.	Andrew McFadden	(Australia)	2003–2004	Rd. 7	Parramatta Eels	Halfback	3	0	0	0	0
64.	Robert Tanielu	(New Zealand)	2003–2004	Rd. 12	Brisbane Broncos	Prop	5	0	0	0	0
65.	Nathan Sologinkin	(Australia)	2003	Rd. 13	Canterbury-Bankstown Bulldogs	Second-row	1	0	0	0	0
66.	Dustin Cooper	(Australia)	2003–2004	Rd. 14	Debut	Wing	17	9	2	0	40
67.	Nathan Friend	(Australia)	2003–2006	Rd. 15	Brisbane Broncos	Hooker	34	0	0	0	0
68.	Antonio Kaufusi	(Tonga) (Australia)	2003–2008	Rd. 22	Debut	Prop	78	6	0	0	24
69.	Matt King	(Australia)	2003–2007	Rd. 24	Debut	Centre	91	60	1	0	242
70.	Ben MacDougall	(Australia) (Scotland)	2004	Rd. 2	Manly Warringah Sea Eagles	Centre	22	7	0	0	28
71.	Alex Chan	(New Zealand)	2004–2005	Rd. 2	Parramatta Eels	Prop	32	4	0	0	16
72.	Steve Turner	(Australia)	2004–2009	Rd. 3	Penrith Panthers	Wing	105	59	14	0	264
73.	Cooper Cronk	(Australia)	2004–2017	Rd. 9	Debut	Halfback	323	92	1	20	390
74.	Jeremy Smith	(New Zealand)	2004–2008	Rd. 23	Debut	Second-row	67	12	1	0	50
75.	Dennis Scott	(Australia)	2005 (Note: Dennis Scott was contracted to Melbourne for the 2006 NRL season, but retired in May 2006 due to injury.)	Rd. 1	Canterbury-Bankstown Bulldogs	Prop	19	3	0	0	12
76.	Brett White	(Australia) (Republic of Ireland)	2005–2010	Rd. 1	Debut	Prop	127	6	0	0	24
77.	Ian Donnelly	(Australia)	2005–2007	Rd. 3	Manly Warringah Sea Eagles	Prop	30	1	0	0	4
78.	Jamie McDonald	(Australia)	2005	Rd. 4	North Queensland Cowboys	Prop	2	0	0	0	0
79.	Greg Inglis	(Australia)	2005–2010	Rd. 6	Debut	Centre, Five-eighth	117	78	9	3	333
80.	Jamie Feeney	(Australia)	2005–2006	Rd. 7	Canterbury-Bankstown Bulldogs	Second-row	20	0	0	0	0
81.	Josh Graham	(Australia)	2005	Rd. 11	Debut	Centre	1	1	0	0	4
82.	Tevita Metuisela	(Australia) (Tonga)	2005	Rd. 14	Sydney Roosters	Prop	3	0	0	0	0
83.	Garret Crossman	(Australia)	2006–2007	Rd. 1	Penrith Panthers	Prop	35	0	0	0	0
84.	Michael Crocker	(Australia)	2006–2008	Rd. 1	Sydney Roosters	Second-row	44	7	0	0	28
85.	Chris Walker	(Australia)	2006	Rd. 3	Sydney Roosters	Wing	7	2	1	0	10
86.	Adam Blair	(New Zealand)	2006–2011	Rd. 4	Debut	Second-row	121	5	0	0	20
87.	Smith Samau	(New Zealand) (Samoa)	2006	Rd. 11	Debut	Wing	1	0	0	0	0
88.	Ben Cross	(Australia)	2006–2007	Rd. 12	Canberra Raiders	Prop	32	0	0	0	0
89.	Matthew Bartlett	(Australia)	2006–2007	Rd. 14	Debut	Second-row	3	0	0	0	0
90.	Jeff Lima	(New Zealand) (Samoa)	2006–2010	Rd. 24	Wests Tigers	Prop	96	8	1	0	34
91.	Anthony Quinn	(Australia)	2007–2012	Rd. 1	Newcastle Knights	Wing	103	38	0	0	152
92.	Israel Folau	(Australia) (Tonga)	2007–2008	Rd. 1	Debut	Wing, Centre	52	36	5	0	154
93.	James Aubusson	(Australia)	2007	Rd. 1	Debut	Hooker	16	1	0	0	4
94.	Ryan Shortland	(New Zealand)	2007	Rd. 2	Debut	Centre	1	0	0	0	0
95.	Sam Tagataese	(New Zealand) (Samoa)	2007–2008	Rd. 4	Debut	Second-row	18	2	0	0	8
96.	Russell Aitken	(Australia)	2007–2008	Rd. 5	Cronulla-Sutherland Sharks	Five-eighth	10	1	0	0	4
97.	Will Chambers	(Australia)	2007–2009, 2012–2019	Rd. 10	Debut	Centre	215	82	2	0	332
98.	Sika Manu	(New Zealand) (Tonga)	2007–2012	Rd. 10	Debut	Second-row	88	17	0	0	68
99.	Scott Anderson	(Australia)	2007–2009	Rd. 10	Debut	Prop	28	0	0	0	0
100.	Clint Newton	(United States) (Australia)	2007	Rd. 13	Newcastle Knights	Second-row	15	4	0	0	16
101.	Clifford Manua	(New Zealand) (Samoa)	2008	Rd. 3	Brisbane Broncos	Prop	4	0	0	0	0
102.	Aiden Tolman	(Australia)	2008–2010	Rd. 6	Debut	Prop	53	4	0	0	16
103.	Brett Anderson	(Australia)	2008–2009	Rd. 10	North Queensland Cowboys	Wing	8	4	0	0	16
104.	Dane Nielsen	(Australia)	2008–2012	Rd. 10	Cronulla-Sutherland Sharks	Centre	78	24	0	0	96
105.	Kevin Proctor	(New Zealand)	2008–2016	Rd. 10	Debut	Second-row	179	28	0	0	112
106.	Liam Foran	(New Zealand)	2008	Rd. 10	Debut	Halfback	3	0	0	0	0
107.	Joe Tomane	(New Zealand) (Samoa)	2008–2009	Rd. 13	Debut	Centre	18	11	17	0	78
108.	Sam Joe	(Australia) (Papua New Guinea)	2008	Rd. 13	Debut	Wing	2	0	0	0	0
109.	Sinbad Kali	(Australia) (Tonga)	2008	Rd. 16	Debut	Prop	1	0	0	0	0
110.	Ryan Hinchcliffe	(Australia)	2009–2015	Rd. 1	Canberra Raiders	Hooker	175	19	0	0	76
111.	Willie Isa	(New Zealand) (Samoa)	2009–2010	Rd. 1	Penrith Panthers	Centre	5	2	0	0	8
112.	Wairangi Koopu	(New Zealand)	2009	Rd. 1	New Zealand Warriors	Second-row	12	1	0	0	4
113.	James Maloney	(Australia)	2009	Rd. 5	Debut	Five-eighth	4	0	0	0	0
114.	Matthew Cross	(Australia)	2009	Rd. 5	Gold Coast Titans	Second-row	14	3	0	0	12
115.	Brett Finch	(Australia)	2009–2010, 2013	Rd. 7	Parramatta Eels	Five-eighth	54	6	1	2	28
116.	Luke Kelly	(Australia)	2009–2010, 2012	Rd. 19	Debut	Five-eighth	6	0	0	0	0
117.	Hep Cahill	(New Zealand)	2009–2010	Rd. 20	Debut	Second-row	8	0	0	0	0
118.	Ryan Tandy	(Australia) (Republic of Ireland)	2009–2010	Rd. 24	Wests Tigers	Prop	16	1	0	0	4
119.	Jesse Bromwich	(New Zealand)	2010–2022	Rd. 1	Debut	Prop	295	32	0	0	128
120.	Rory Kostjasyn	(Australia) (Republic of Ireland)	2010–2012	Rd. 1	Debut	Hooker	32	2	0	0	8
121.	Todd Lowrie	(Australia)	2010–2012	Rd. 2	Parramatta Eels	Lock	64	6	0	0	24
122.	Luke MacDougall	(Australia) (Scotland)	2010	Rd. 1	Newcastle Knights	Wing	10	4	0	0	16
123.	Bryan Norrie	(Australia)	2010–2014	Rd. 3	Cronulla-Sutherland Sharks	Prop	120	8	0	0	32
124.	Matt Duffie	(New Zealand)	2010–2013	Rd. 7	Debut	Wing	62	37	1	0	150
125.	Gareth Widdop	(England)	2010–2013	Rd. 7	Debut	Five-eighth	71	10	25	1	91
126.	Chase Stanley	(Australia) (New Zealand) (Samoa)	2010–2011	Rd. 12	St. George Illawarra Dragons	Centre	8	2	1	0	10
127.	Justin O'Neill	(Australia) (Vanuatu)	2010–2014	Rd. 14	Debut	Centre	67	34	0	0	136
128.	Robbie Rochow	(Australia)	2010–2011, 2017	Rd. 14	Debut	Second-row	3	0	0	0	0
129.	Sione Kite	(Australia) (Tonga)	2010–2011	Rd. 21	Canterbury-Bankstown Bulldogs	Prop	3	0	0	0	0
130.	Jaiman Lowe	(Australia)	2011–2012	Rd. 1	South Sydney Rabbitohs	Prop	38	1	0	0	4
131.	Troy Thompson	(Australia)	2011	Rd. 1	Canberra Raiders	Prop	7	0	0	0	0
132.	Beau Champion	(Australia)	2011	Rd. 2	South Sydney Rabbitohs	Centre	16	8	0	0	32
133.	Adam Woolnough	(Australia)	2011	Rd. 4	Penrith Panthers	Prop	21	0	0	0	0
134.	Atelea Vea	(Tonga)	2011	Rd. 4	Cronulla-Sutherland Sharks	Second-row	11	0	0	0	0
135.	Maurice Blair	(Australia)	2011–2013	Rd. 9	Penrith Panthers	Centre	36	13	1	0	54
136.	Sisa Waqa	(Fiji)	2011–2014	Rd. 9	Sydney Roosters	Wing	67	41	0	0	164
137.	Dane Chisholm	(Australia) (France)	2011	Rd. 10	Debut	Five-eighth	1	0	0	0	0
138.	Jack Afamasaga	(New Zealand) (Samoa)	2011	Rd. 26	Cronulla-Sutherland Sharks	Second-row	1	0	0	0	0
139.	Siosaia Vave	(Australia) (Tonga)	2012–2013	Rd. 1	Cronulla-Sutherland Sharks	Prop	23	1	0	0	4
140.	Jason Ryles	(Australia)	2012–2013	Rd. 2	Sydney Roosters	Prop	46	1	0	0	4
141.	Michael Greenfield	(Australia)	2012	Rd. 12	St. George Illawarra Dragons	Prop	1	0	0	0	0
142.	Richard Faʻaoso	(Australia) (Tonga)	2012	Rd. 20	Newcastle Knights	Prop	6	0	0	0	0
143.	Mahe Fonua	(Australia) (Tonga)	2012–2015	Rd. 23	Debut	Centre	50	24	0	0	96
144.	Tohu Harris	(New Zealand)	2013–2017	Rd. 1	Debut	Second-row	117	18	8	0	88
145.	Junior Moors	(New Zealand) (Samoa)	2013–2014	Rd. 1	Wests Tigers	Second-row	21	0	0	0	0
146.	Lagi Setu	(New Zealand) (Samoa)	2013	Rd. 1	Brisbane Broncos	Second-row	7	1	0	0	4
147.	Slade Griffin	(New Zealand)	2013–2017	Rd. 1	Debut	Hooker	25	0	0	0	0
148.	Junior Sa'u	(New Zealand) (Samoa)	2013	Rd. 3	Newcastle Knights	Centre	4	1	0	0	4
149.	Kenny Bromwich	(New Zealand)	2013–2022	Rd. 5	Debut	Prop	216	28	0	0	112
150.	Jordan McLean	(Australia) (New Zealand)	2013–2017	Rd. 11	Debut	Prop	86	4	0	0	16
151.	Mitch Garbutt	(Australia)	2013–2014	Rd. 14	Debut	Prop	9	0	0	0	0
152.	Ben Hampton	(Australia)	2013–2016	Rd. 15	Debut	Fullback	35	6	0	0	24
153.	Tim Glasby	(Australia)	2013–2018	Rd. 16	Debut	Prop	110	10	0	0	40
154.	Young Tonumaipea	(Samoa)	2014–2018, 2022–2024	Rd. 1	Debut	Wing, Centre	55	17	0	0	68
155.	Ben Roberts	(Australia) (Samoa) (New Zealand)	2014	Rd. 1	Parramatta Eels	Five-eighth	18	2	3	0	14
156.	George Rose	(Australia)	2014	Rd. 1	Manly Warringah Sea Eagles	Prop	9	0	0	0	0
157.	Dayne Weston	(Australia)	2014–2015	Rd. 5	Penrith Panthers	Prop	16	0	0	0	0
158.	Kurt Mann	(Australia)	2014–2015	Rd. 9	Debut	Centre	28	10	0	0	40
159.	Joel Romelo	(Australia) (Italy)	2014	Rd. 10	Canterbury-Bankstown Bulldogs	Hooker	2	0	0	0	0
160.	Cameron Munster	(Australia)	2014–	Rd. 12	Debut	Fullback, Five-eighth	255	65	47	4	358
161.	Marika Koroibete	(Fiji)	2014–2016	Rd. 18	Wests Tigers	Wing	58	34	0	0	136
162.	Blake Green	(Australia)	2015–2016	Rd. 1	Wigan Warriors	Five-eighth	50	10	0	0	40
163.	Dale Finucane	(Australia)	2015–2021	Rd. 1	Canterbury-Bankstown Bulldogs	Lock	152	15	1	0	62
164.	Felise Kaufusi	(Australia) (Tonga)	2015–2022	Rd. 1	Debut	Prop	173	29	0	0	116
165.	Tom Learoyd-Lahrs	(Australia)	2015	Rd. 2	Canberra Raiders	Prop	1	0	0	0	0
166.	Nelson Asofa-Solomona	(New Zealand) (Samoa)	2015–2025	Rd. 8	Debut	Second-row	215	35	0	0	140
167.	Christian Welch	(Australia)	2015–2024	Rd. 9	Debut	Prop	163	7	0	0	28
168.	Richard Kennar	(Samoa)	2015–2016	Rd. 13	Debut	Wing	9	2	0	0	8
169.	Hymel Hunt	(New Zealand)	2015	Rd. 14	Gold Coast Titans	Centre	3	1	0	0	4
170.	Curtis Scott	(Australia)	2016–2019	Rd. 1	Debut	Centre	48	18	0	0	72
171.	Suliasi Vunivalu	(Fiji)	2016–2020	Rd. 7	Debut	Wing	111	86	0	0	344
172.	Cheyse Blair	(Australia)	2016–2018	Rd. 9	Manly Warringah Sea Eagles	Wing	38	18	0	0	72
173.	Ryan Morgan	(Australia)	2016	Rd. 11	Parramatta Eels	Centre	8	2	0	0	8
174.	Brodie Croft	(Australia)	2016–2019	Rd. 15	Debut	Halfback	39	12	9	2	68
175.	Matthew White	(Australia)	2016	Rd. 19	Gold Coast Titans	Prop	3	0	0	0	0
176.	Josh Addo-Carr	(Australia)	2017–2021	Rd. 1	Wests Tigers	Wing	118	96	1	0	386
177.	Ryley Jacks	(Australia) (Canada)	2017–2018, 2020–2021	Rd. 1	Debut	Five-eighth	35	7	0	0	28
178.	Vincent Leuluai	(Australia) (Samoa)	2017	Rd. 2	Sydney Roosters	Second-row	2	0	0	0	0
179.	Joe Stimson	(Australia)	2017–2019	Rd. 2	Debut	Second-row	51 (Note: Joe Stimson was an unused interchange player in the 2019 Melbourne Storm season Round 10 match against Wests Tigers, he does not gain an official appearance for this match.)	9	3	0	42
180.	Mark Nicholls	(Australia)	2017	Rd. 5	Canberra Raiders	Second-row	9	0	0	0	0
181.	Tui Kamikamica	(Fiji)	2017–2026	Rd. 5	Debut	Prop	142	11	0	0	44
182.	Brandon Smith	(New Zealand)	2017–2022	Rd. 13	Debut	Hooker, Second-row	107	22	0	0	88
183.	Dean Britt	(Australia)	2017	Rd. 15	Debut	Second-row	1	0	0	0	0
184.	Jahrome Hughes	(New Zealand)	2017–	Rd. 16	North Queensland Cowboys	Halfback, Fullback	186	72	0	0	288
185.	Nate Myles	(Australia)	2017	Rd. 18	Manly Warringah Sea Eagles	Prop	3	0	0	0	0
186.	Sam Kasiano	(Samoa) (New Zealand)	2018	Rd. 1	Canterbury Bankstown Bulldogs	Prop	14	1	0	0	4
187.	Justin Olam	(Papua New Guinea)	2018–2023	Rd. 9	Debut	Centre, Wing	104	46	0	0	184
188.	Harry Grant	(Australia)	2018–2019, 2021–	Rd. 11	Debut	Hooker	126	44	6	0	188
189.	Patrick Kaufusi	(Tonga)	2018–2019	Rd. 16	North Queensland Cowboys	Prop	3	0	0	0	0
190.	Albert Vete	(Tonga)	2018–2020	Rd. 17	New Zealand Warriors	Prop	8	0	0	0	0
191.	Scott Drinkwater	(Australia)	2018 (Note: Scott Drinkwater was contracted to Melbourne until he was released during the 2019 NRL season, but did not play a game for Melbourne in 2019 due to injury.)	Rd. 25	Debut	Fullback	1	1	0	0	4
192.	Tom Eisenhuth	(Australia)	2019–2023	Rd. 1	Penrith Panthers	Second-row, Centre	58	5	0	0	20
193.	Marion Seve	(Australia) (Samoa)	2019–2026	Rd. 2	Debut	Centre	52	13	0	0	52
194.	Ryan Papenhuyzen	(Australia)	2019–2025	Rd. 4	Debut	Fullback	113	77	156	6 (Note: 5× 1 point field goals; 1× 2 point field goals)	635
195.	Sandor Earl	(New Zealand)	2019–2020	Rd. 5	Canberra Raiders	Wing	8	3	0	0	12
196.	Billy Walters	(Australia)	2019	Rd. 16	Debut	Five-eighth	2	0	0	0	0
197.	Tino Fa'asuamaleaui	(Samoa)	2019–2020	Rd. 16	Debut	Prop	27	7	0	0	28
198.	Nicho Hynes	(Australia)	2019–2021	Rd. 21	Debut	Fullback	36 (Note: Nicho Hynes was an unused interchange player in the 2020 NRL Grand Final, he does not gain an official appearance for this match.)	10	62	0	164
199.	Max King	(Australia) (England)	2019–2020 (Note: Max King was contracted to Melbourne until the end of the 2021 NRL season, but did not play a game in 2021 due to injury.)	Rd. 23	Gold Coast Titans	Prop	12	1	0	0	4
200.	Brenko Lee	(Australia) (Tonga)	2020 (Note: Brenko Lee was contracted to Melbourne until the end of the 2021 NRL season, but did not play a game in 2021 due to injury.)	Rd. 4	Gold Coast Titans	Wing, Centre	14	4	0	0	16
201.	Chris Lewis	(Australia)	2020–2024	Rd. 4	Debut	Second-row	45	4	0	0	16
202.	Paul Momirovski	(Australia) (Serbia)	2020	Rd. 7	Wests Tigers	Centre, Wing	6	4	0	0	16
203.	Darryn Schonig	(Australia)	2020–2021	Rd. 9	Debut	Prop	7	0	0	0	0
204.	Cooper Johns	(Australia) (Italy)	2020–2022	Rd. 15	Debut	Five-eighth, Halfback	11	1	0	0	4
205.	Isaac Lumelume	(Fiji)	2020–2021	Rd. 16	Debut	Wing	6	3	0	0	12
206.	Ricky Leutele	(Samoa)	2020	Rd. 20	Toronto Wolfpack	Centre	1	0	0	0	0
207.	Aaron Pene	(New Zealand)	2020–2021, 2023 (Note: Aaron Pene was released from his contract with Melbourne during the 2024 NRL season, but did not play an NRL game in 2024 for Melbourne)	Rd. 20	Debut	Prop	18	0	0	0	0
208.	Aaron Booth	(Australia)	2020–2021	Rd. 20	Debut	Hooker	6	0	0	0	0
209.	George Jennings	(Australia) (Tonga)	2021–2023	Rd. 1	Parramatta Eels	Wing	21	12	0	0	48
210.	Reimis Smith	(Australia) (New Zealand)	2021–2024	Rd. 1	Canterbury Bulldogs	Centre, Wing	68	25	0	0	100
211.	Tyson Smoothy	(Australia)	2021	Rd. 1	Debut	Hooker	4	0	3	0	6
212.	Trent Loiero	(Australia) (Italy)	2021–	Rd. 4	Debut	Second-row	121	12	0	0	48
213.	Dean Ieremia	(Australia) (Samoa)	2021–2024 (Note: Dean Ieremia was released at the end of the 2025 NRL season after missing the entire season due to injury)	Rd. 8	Debut	Wing	23	10	0	0	40
214.	Jordan Grant	(Australia) (Serbia)	2021–2023	Rd. 18	Debut	Prop	7	0	0	0	0
215.	Tepai Moeroa	(Cook Islands)	2021–2024	Rd. 21	Parramatta Eels	Second-row	21	1	0	0	4
216.	Daniel Atkinson	(Australia) (Italy)	2021	Rd. 25	Debut	Five-eighth, Halfback	1	0	0	0	0
217.	Xavier Coates	(Australia) (Papua New Guinea)	2022–	Rd. 1	Brisbane Broncos	Wing	76	63	0	0	252
218.	Nick Meaney	(Australia)	2022–2026	Rd. 1	Canterbury-Bankstown Bulldogs	Fullback	114	43	357	0	886
219.	Josh King	(Australia)	2022–	Rd. 1	Newcastle Knights	Prop	127	13	0	0	48
220.	Tyran Wishart	(Australia)	2022–2026	Rd. 1	Debut	Hooker	100 (Note: Tyran Wishart was an unused interchange player in the round 7 2024 match against the Roosters. He does not gain official appearances for this match.)	27	20	0	148
221.	Alec MacDonald	(New Zealand) (Australia)	2022–	Rd. 1	Debut	Second-row, Lock	85	5	0	0	20
222.	Grant Anderson	(Australia)	2022–2025	Rd. 14	Debut	Centre, Wing	48 (Note: Grant Anderson was an unused interchange player during two matches of the 2023 NRL season: the Round 5 match against South Sydney, and the Round 12 match against the Dolphins. He does not gain official appearances for these matches.)	23	0	0	92
223.	Jayden Nikorima	(New Zealand)	2022–2023	Rd. 16	Sydney Roosters	Five-eighth, Hooker	2	0	0	0	0
224.	David Nofoaluma	(Samoa)	2022	Rd. 21	Wests Tigers	Wing	6	4	0	0	16
225.	William Warbrick	(New Zealand)	2023–2026	Rd. 1	Debut	Wing	74	53	0	0	212
226.	Eliesa Katoa	(Tonga)	2023–	Rd. 1	New Zealand Warriors	Second-row	72	32	0	0	128
227.	Bronson Garlick	(Australia)	2023–2025	Rd. 1	Debut	Lock, Second-row	39	3	0	0	12
228.	Kane Bradley	(Australia)	2023–2025	Rd. 2	North Queensland Cowboys	Wing, Centre	11	5	0	0	20
229.	Jonah Pezet	(Australia)	2023–2025	Rd. 3	Debut	Halfback, Five-eighth	18	2	5	0	18
230.	Tariq Sims	(Fiji) (Australia)	2023	Rd. 3	St George Illawarra Dragons	Prop, Second-row	15	1	0	0	4
231.	Sualauvi Fa'alogo	(Australia) (Samoa)	2023–	Rd. 27	Debut	Fullback, Wing	46	32	11	0	150
232.	Jack Howarth	(Australia)	2023–	Rd. 27	Debut	Centre, Second-row	50	12	0	0	48
233.	Joe Chan	(France) (New Zealand)	2023–2026	Rd. 27	Catalans Dragons	Second-row	47	4	0	0	16
234.	Shawn Blore	(Australia) (Samoa)	2024–2026	Rd. 3	Wests Tigers	Second-row	61	4	0	0	16
235.	Lazarus Vaalepu	(Australia) (Samoa)	2024–2025 (Note: Lazarus Vaalepu was released during the 2026 NRL season after not making any appearances during that season.)	Rd. 20	Debut	Prop	11 (Note: Lazarus Vaalepu was an unused interchange player in the round 24 2024 match against the Panthers. He does not gain an official appearance for this match.)	1	0	0	4
236.	Keagan Russell-Smith	(Australia)	2024–2026	Rd. 26	Debut	Five-eighth, Halfback	2	0	0	0	0
237.	Ativalu Lisati	(New Zealand) (Samoa)	2024–	Rd. 26	Debut	Second-row	25	5	0	0	20
238.	Tristan Powell	(Australia)	2024	Rd. 26	Debut	Prop	1	0	0	0	0
239.	Stefano Utoikamanu	(Australia) (Samoa) (Tonga)	2025–	Rd. 1	Wests Tigers	Prop	49	5	0	0	20
240.	Moses Leo	(New Zealand)	2025–	Rd. 5	Debut	Centre, Wing	19	11	0	0	44
241.	Siulagi Tuimalatu-Brown	(Australia)	2025–	Rd. 18	Debut	Centre, Wing	13	6	0	0	24
242.	Davvy Moale	(Cook Islands)	2026	Rd. 1	South Sydney Rabbitohs	Second-row	10	0	0	0	0
243.	Cooper Clarke	(Australia) (New Zealand)	2026–	Rd. 1	Debut	Prop, Second-row	24	2	0	0	8
244.	Preston Conn	(Australia)	2026–	Rd. 1	Debut	Lock, Second-row	1	0	0	0	0
245.	Jack Hetherington	(Australia)	2026–	Rd. 2	Newcastle Knights	Prop	9	0	0	0	0
246.	Angus Hinchey	(Australia)	2026–	Rd. 2	Debut	Second-row	6	1	1	0	6
247.	Manaia Waitere	(New Zealand)	2026–	Rd. 4	Canberra Raiders	Centre, Wing	8	2	0	0	8
248.	Hugo Peel	(Australia)	2026–	Rd. 9	Debut	Fullback, Wing	3	1	0	0	4
249.	Trent Toelau	(New Zealand)	2026–	Rd. 9	Penrith Panthers	Five-eighth, Halfback, Hooker	11	1	0	0	4
250.	Stanley Huen	(Australia)	2026–	Rd. 10	Debut	Five-eighth, Second-row	4	0	0	0	0
251.	Gabriel Satrick	(Australia)	2026–	Rd. 12	Debut	Hooker	1	0	0	0	0
252.	Oryn Keeley	(Australia)	2026–	Rd. 19	Dolphins	Second-row, Lock	8	2	0	0	8
253.	Josiah Pahulu	(Australia) (New Zealand)	2026	Rd. 19	Gold Coast Titans	Prop, Second-row	1	0	0	0	0
254.	Hayden Watson	(Australia)	2026–	Rd. 22	Debut	Halfback, Five-eighth, Hooker	2	1	0	0	4
255.	Jai Bowden	(Australia)	2026–	Rd. 22	Debut	Hooker, Halfback, Five-eighth	1	0	0	0	0
Cap No.	Name	Nationality	Storm career	Debut round	Previous club	Position	Appearances	Tries	Goals	Field goals	Points

== NRL Nines players ==
Melbourne have fielded teams in each edition of the NRL Nines held in 2014–2017 and 2020.

Notes:

- Players are listed in debut order, with the first 17 correlating in jersey number worn in debut game in the 2014 Auckland Nines tournament.
- Player numbers in this list are unofficial.
- † indicates captain during tournament.

No.	Name	Nationality	Tournaments	BP tries	Tries	Goals	Field goals	Points
1.	Will Chambers	(Australia)	2014, 2015†	1	3	1	0	19
2.	Sisa Waqa	(Fiji)	2014	0	0	2	0	4
3.	Joel Romelo	(Australia)	2014	0	0	0	0	0
4.	Mahe Fonua	(Tonga)	2014	1	1	0	0	9
5.	Matt Duffie	(New Zealand)	2014	0	0	0	0	0
6.	Young Tonumaipea	(Samoa)	2014, 2015, 2016, 2017†	0	4	0	0	16
7.	Mitch Garbutt	(Australia)	2014	0	1	0	0	4
8.	Justin O'Neill	(Australia)	2014	0	0	0	0	0
9.	Tohu Harris	(New Zealand)	2014, 2015, 2016	0	1	0	0	4
10.	Matthew Lodge	(Australia)	2014	0	0	0	0	0
11.	Kevin Proctor	(New Zealand)	2014	0	0	0	0	0
12.	Ryan Hoffman	(Australia)	2014†	0	0	0	0	0
13.	Slade Griffin	(New Zealand)	2014	0	0	0	0	0
14.	Kurt Mann	(Australia)	2014, 2015	0	1	2	0	8
15.	Cameron Munster	(Australia)	2014, 2015, 2016, 2017, 2020	1	3	6	0	29
16.	Richard Kennar	(Samoa)	2014, 2015, 2016	1	3	0	0	17
17.	Jesse Bromwich	(New Zealand)	2014	0	0	0	0	0
18.	Kenny Bromwich	(New Zealand)	2015, 2016, 2017†	0	1	0	0	4
19.	Dayne Weston	(Australia)	2015	0	0	0	0	0
20.	Hymel Hunt	(New Zealand)	2015	0	1	0	0	4
21.	Marika Koroibete	(Fiji)	2015, 2016	0	1	0	0	4
22.	Travis Robinson	(Lebanon)	2015	0	0	0	0	0
23.	Christian Welch	(Australia)	2015	0	0	0	0	0
24.	Ben Hampton	(Australia)	2015, 2016	0	1	0	0	4
25.	Billy Brittain	(Australia)	2015	0	0	0	0	0
26.	Francis Tualau	(Tonga)	2015	0	0	0	0	0
27.	Nelson Asofa-Solomona	(New Zealand)	2015, 2016	0	1	0	0	4
28.	Suliasi Vunivalu	(Fiji)	2015	0	0	0	0	0
29.	Shaun Nona	(Australia)	2015	0	0	0	0	0
30.	Curtis Scott	(Australia)	2016	0	2	0	0	8
31.	Blake Green	(Australia)	2016†	0	1	0	0	4
32.	Brodie Croft	(Australia)	2016, 2017	0	2	4	0	16
33.	Mark Nicholls	(Australia)	2016, 2017	2	0	0	0	10
34.	Dale Finucane	(Australia)	2016	0	0	0	0	0
35.	Nafe Seluini	(Tonga)	2016	0	0	0	0	0
36.	Jeremy Hawkins	(New Zealand)	2016	0	0	0	0	0
37.	Dean Britt	(Australia)	2016	0	0	0	0	0
38.	Joe Stimson	(Australia)	2016, 2017	0	0	0	0	0
39.	Tony Tumusa	(New Zealand)	2016	0	0	0	0	0
40.	Josh Addo-Carr	(Australia)	2017	1	2	0	0	13
41.	Cheyse Blair	(Australia)	2017	0	0	0	0	0
42.	Linc Port	(Australia)	2017	0	0	0	0	0
43.	Tim Glasby	(Australia)	2017	0	0	0	0	0
44.	Felise Kaufusi	(Australia)	2017	0	1	0	0	4
45.	Scott Drinkwater	(Australia)	2017	0	0	1	0	2
46.	Ryley Jacks	(Canada)	2017	0	1	0	0	4
47.	Jake Turpin	(Australia)	2017	0	0	0	0	0
48.	Vincent Leuluai	(Australia)	2017	0	0	0	0	0
49.	Nicho Hynes	(Australia)	2020	0	0	0	0	0
50.	Dean Ieremia	(Australia)	2020	0	1	0	0	4
51.	Brenko Lee	(Australia)	2020	0	0	0	0	0
52.	Marion Seve	(Samoa)	2020	0	0	0	0	0
53.	Sandor Earl	(New Zealand)	2020†	0	0	0	0	0
54.	Cooper Johns	(Australia)	2020	0	0	0	0	0
55.	Tui Kamikamica	(Fiji)	2020†	0	0	0	0	0
56.	Harry Grant	(Australia)	2020	0	0	0	0	0
57.	Tino Fa'asuamaleaui	(Samoa)	2020	0	1	0	0	4
58.	Max King	(Australia)	2020	0	0	0	0	0
59.	Chris Lewis	(Australia)	2020	0	0	0	0	0
60.	Tom Eisenhuth	(Australia)	2020	0	0	0	0	0
61.	Judda Turahui	(Australia)	2020	0	0	0	0	0
62.	Trent Loiero	(Australia)	2020	0	0	0	0	0
63.	Justin Olam	(Papua New Guinea)	2020	0	0	0	0	0
64.	Darryn Schonig	(Australia)	2020	0	0	0	0	0
65.	Sitiveni Moceidreke	(Fiji)	2020	0	0	0	0	0

== NRL Under-20s players ==
The NRL Under-20s competition, known commercially as the Toyota Cup (2008–2012) and Holden Cup (2013–2017) was contested by the Melbourne Storm. Colloquially, the team was known as the Thunderbolts, a name which has carried through to the joint-venture Storm/VRL junior representative team, the Victoria Thunderbolts who compete in NSWRL competitions (and previously QRL competitions). The team was based in Melbourne (2008–2015), before playing out of the Sunshine Coast for the 2016–17 seasons, playing home games at Sunshine Coast Stadium, Suzuki Stadium with occasional games in Melbourne.

Notes:

- Players are listed in debut order, with the first 17 correlating in jersey number worn in debut game in Round 1, 2008.
- Player numbers in this list are unofficial.
- Statistics in this season are current as at the end of the 2017 season and the disbanding of the competition (source).
- Players highlighted in **bold** also played in the NRL for Melbourne.

No.	Name	Nationality	U20s Storm career	Debut round	Graduate to NRL (Debut year)	Position(s)	Appearances	Tries	Goals	Field goals	Points
1.	Michael Fa'amausili		2008	Rd. 1		Fullback	22	8	0	0	32
2.	Trent Walker	(Australia)	2008	Rd. 1		Wing	11	6	0	0	24
**3.**	Sam Joe	(Australia) (Papua New Guinea)	2008–2009	Rd. 1	Melbourne Storm (2008)	Centre, Wing	44	25	0	0	100
**4.**	Joe Tomane	(Australia) (Samoa)	2008–2009	Rd. 1	Melbourne Storm (2008)	Centre	15	15	9	0	78
5.	Malo Feterika	(New Zealand)	2008	Rd. 1		Wing	11	6	0	0	24
**6.**	Gareth Widdop	(England)	2008–2009	Rd. 1	Melbourne Storm (2010)	Fullback, Five-eighth	44	25	111	0	322
**7.**	Liam Foran	(Australia)	2008	Rd. 1	Melbourne Storm (2008)	Halfback	20	3	47	0	106
**8.**	Aiden Tolman	(Australia)	2008	Rd. 1	Melbourne Storm (2008)	Prop	13	0	0	0	0
9.	Jay Aston	(Australia) (Papua New Guinea)	2008	Rd. 1		Hooker	22	4	0	0	16
10.	Louis Fanene	(New Zealand)	2008	Rd. 1		Prop	23	4	0	0	16
11.	Aidan Guerra	(Australia)	2008	Rd. 1	Sydney Roosters (2010)	Second-row	6	0	0	0	0
12.	Lucas Miller	(Australia)	2008	Rd. 1		Second-row	15	5	2	0	24
13.	Will Naitoro	(Solomon Islands)	2008–2009	Rd. 1		Lock	24	2	0	0	8
14.	Zeb Tawha		2008	Rd. 1		Centre, Second-row	24	8	0	0	32
15.	Vili Faingaʻa	(Australia) (Tonga)	2008	Rd. 1		Prop	24	1	0	0	4
16.	Ryan Hansen	(Australia)	2008	Rd. 1		Prop	11	0	2	0	4
17.	Theodore Stuart	(New Zealand)	2008–2010	Rd. 1		Prop	33	1	0	0	4
18.	Mack Fawcett		2008	Rd. 2		Wing	16	5	0	0	20
**19.**	Kevin Proctor	(New Zealand)	2008–2009	Rd. 2	Melbourne Storm (2008)	Second-row	21	2	0	0	8
**20.**	Luke Kelly	(Australia)	2008–2009	Rd. 2	Melbourne Storm (2009)	Five-eighth	45	7	0	1	29
21.	Matt Crocker	(Australia)	2008–2009	Rd. 3		Prop	21	2	0	0	8
22.	Petera Tamarua	(New Zealand) (Australia)	2008	Rd. 4		Wing	1	0	0	0	0
23.	Pulou Vaituutuu	(New Zealand)	2008–2009	Rd. 4		Prop	46	3	0	0	12
24.	Russ Webber		2008	Rd. 6		Centre	4	2	0	0	8
25.	James Woolford	(Australia)	2008–2010	Rd. 7		Hooker	41	8	0	0	32
26.	Kruize Wilson		2008	Rd. 10		Second-row	4	0	0	0	0
27.	Josh Jerome	(Australia)	2008–2011	Rd. 13		Fullback, Centre	50	27	85	0	278
28.	David Etrich		2008	Rd. 16		Lock	5	1	0	0	4
**29.**	Robbie Rochow	(Australia)	2009–2010	Rd. 1	Melbourne Storm (2010)	Centre, Second-row	28	11	0	0	44
**30.**	Matt Duffie	(New Zealand)	2009	Rd. 1	Melbourne Storm (2010)	Wing	22	25	0	0	100
**31.**	Dane Chisholm	(Australia) (France)	2009–2010	Rd. 1	Melbourne Storm (2011)	Five-eighth	25	18	3	0	78
**32.**	Jesse Bromwich	(New Zealand)	2009	Rd. 1	Melbourne Storm (2010)	Prop	22	11	0	0	44
33.	Brendan Train	(Australia)	2009	Rd. 1		Second-row	7	1	0	0	4
34.	Fred Makimare	(Australia) (Cook Islands)	2009	Rd. 1		Second-row	27	8	0	0	32
35.	Billy Rogers	(Australia)	2009	Rd. 1	Parramatta Eels (2011)	Lock	24	3	0	0	12
36.	Jai Jones-Wiegold	(Australia)	2009	Rd. 1		Hooker	20	4	0	0	16
37.	Blake Leary	(Australia)	2009–2010	Rd. 1	North Queensland Cowboys (2012)	Lock	26	17	5	1	79
38.	Andrew Smith	(Australia)	2009	Rd. 1		Prop	8	1	0	0	4
39.	Grayson Goodwin		2009	Rd. 3		Five-eighth	1	0	0	0	0
40.	Pita Maile	(Tonga)	2009–2010	Rd. 3		Centre	29	12	0	0	48
41.	Keni Blair	(New Zealand)	2009	Rd. 4		Wing, Five-eighth	5	0	0	0	0
42.	Sam Martin	(Australia)	2009–2010	Rd. 4		Second-row	28	5	0	0	20
**43.**	Jordan McLean	(Australia) (New Zealand)	2009–2011	Rd. 4	Melbourne Storm (2013)	Prop	47	5	0	0	20
44.	James Barker	(Australia)	2009–2010	Rd. 7		Prop	14	1	0	0	4
45.	Jake Hawkins	(Australia)	2009–2010	Rd. 8		Five-eighth, Hooker	30	1	6	0	16
**46.**	Justin O'Neill	(Australia) (Vanuatu)	2009–2010	Rd. 11	Melbourne Storm (2010)	Fullback, Centre	17	16	0	0	64
**47.**	Kenny Bromwich	(New Zealand)	2009–2011	Rd. 15	Melbourne Storm (2013)	Second-row	51	15	0	0	60
**48.**	Slade Griffin	(New Zealand)	2009–2011	Rd. 17	Melbourne Storm (2013)	Centre, Hooker	46	13	0	0	52
**49.**	Willie Isa	(New Zealand) (Samoa)	2009	Rd. 21	Melbourne Storm (2009)	Wing	3	0	0	0	0
50.	Brayden Wiliame	(Australia) (Fiji)	2010–2012	Rd. 1	Parramatta Eels (2013)	Fullback, Centre	21	5	0	0	20
51.	Kirisome Auva'a	(Samoa)	2010–2012	Rd. 1	South Sydney Rabbitohs (2014)	Wing, Centre	67	33	0	0	132
52.	Eddie Fa'amausili		2010–2011	Rd. 1		Wing	26	15	0	0	64
53.	Jordan Meads	(New Zealand) (Greece)	2010	Rd. 1		Halfback	9	5	0	0	20
**54.**	Ben Hampton	(Australia)	2010–2012	Rd. 1	Melbourne Storm (2013)	Fullback, Halfback	52	26	0	0	104
**55.**	Tohu Harris	(New Zealand)	2010–2012	Rd. 1	Melbourne Storm (2013)	Second-row	49	25	0	0	100
56.	Bennett Leslie		2010	Rd. 2		Wing	13	4	0	0	16
57.	Jamie Ingram		2010	Rd. 3			3	1	0	0	4
58.	Lucas Grech		2010–2011	Rd. 4		Hooker	17	0	0	0	0
59.	Mitchel Johnson	(Australia)	2010	Rd. 4		Prop	12	4	0	0	16
60.	Ryan Marlin		2010	Rd. 6			7	1	0	0	4
61.	Robert Kurth		2010	Rd. 7		Wing	6	4	0	0	16
62.	Rulon Nutria	(New Zealand)	2010	Rd. 7		Prop	18	4	0	0	16
63.	Jarome Wilson		2010–2012	Rd. 8		Prop	60	7	0	0	28
64.	Maipele Morseu	(Australia)	2010	Rd. 10		Fullback, Halfback	13	5	0	0	20
**65.**	Mahe Fonua	(Australia) (Tonga)	2010–2012	Rd. 18	Melbourne Storm (2012)	Centre	47	33	1	0	134
66.	Matt Smith		2010–2011	Rd. 20			13	0	0	0	0
67.	Matt Constantinou	(Australia) (Greece)	2010–2012	Rd. 22		Second-row	36	2	0	0	8
68.	Jarome Henry		2010	Rd. 22			2	0	0	0	0
69.	Sean Loxley		2011	Rd. 1		Fullback	25	15	1	0	62
70.	Ryan Pooley		2011–2012	Rd. 1		Wing	38	15	0	0	60
71.	Matt McGahan	(Australia) (New Zealand)	2011–2013	Rd. 1		Five-eighth	54	19	172	1	421
72.	Karl Davies		2011–2012	Rd. 1		Prop	46	4	0	0	16
73.	Zac Moimoi		2011–2012	Rd. 1		Prop	25	0	0	0	0
74.	John Leiataua	(Australia)	2011	Rd. 1		Second-row	22	6	0	0	24
75.	Krys Freeman	(New Zealand)	2011	Rd. 1		Second-row	24	3	0	0	12
76.	Damian Sironen	(Australia)	2011–2012	Rd. 1		Lock	45	1	0	0	4
77.	Jesse Parete		2011	Rd. 2			5	0	0	0	0
**78.**	Young Tonumaipea	(Samoa)	2011–2012	Rd. 3	Melbourne Storm (2014)	Fullback, Wing	47	18	2	0	76
79.	Kurtis Ritchie		2011	Rd. 5			1	0	0	0	0
80.	Barnabas Tavu'i-Leota		2011–2012	Rd. 7		Hooker	9	1	0	0	4
81.	Joseph Kamana		2011	Rd. 12		Wing	1	0	0	0	0
82.	Herschel Gideon	(New Zealand)	2011–2012	Rd. 12		Halfback	38	7	0	0	28
83.	Steve Liki	(Australia)	2011–2013	Rd. 16		Lock	13	2	0	0	8
84.	Denny Solomona	(New Zealand)	2011–2013	Rd. 19		Fullback, Wing	39	30	2	0	124
85.	Alex Langbridge	(Australia)	2012–2013	Rd. 1		Hooker	43	2	0	0	8
86.	Cade Umaga	(New Zealand)	2012–2013	Rd. 1		Second-row	41	9	0	1	37
**87.**	Dean Britt	(Australia)	2012–2014	Rd. 1	Melbourne Storm (2017)	Second-row	52	5	0	0	20
88.	Sheldon Powe-Hobbs	(Australia) (Scotland)	2012	Rd. 1		Lock	11	1	0	0	4
**89.**	Richard Kennar	(Samoa)	2012-2014	Rd. 2	Melbourne Storm (2015)	Centre	40	18	0	0	72
90.	Jack Joass		2012	Rd. 4		Wing, Centre	16	6	41	0	106
91.	Waita Setu		2012	Rd. 5			1	0	0	0	0
92.	Dane Chang	(Australia)	2012–2013	Rd. 6		Wing	31	24	0	0	96
93.	Jay Lobwein	(Australia)	2012	Rd. 6		Hooker	15	0	0	0	0
94.	Tom Shearman		2012	Rd. 6		Lock, Second-row	5	0	0	0	0
95.	Ben Meehan	(Australia)	2012	Rd. 7		Halfback	15	3	0	0	12
96.	Rhys Kennedy	(Australia)	2012–2014	Rd. 9	South Sydney Rabbitohs (2019)	Prop	55	7	0	0	28
97.	James De Saxe		2012	Rd. 13			4	2	0	0	8
98.	Michael Butson	(New Zealand)	2012–2013	Rd. 15		Wing	9	3	0	0	12
99.	Pride Petterson-Robati	(New Zealand) (Cook Islands)	2012–2014	Rd. 15		Second-row	27	4	0	0	16
100.	Jordan Shepherd		2012	Rd. 24			1	0	0	0	0
**101.**	Kurt Mann	(Australia)	2013	Rd. 1	Melbourne Storm (2014)	Fullback	15	5	0	0	20
102.	Niua Finau Puaka	(Australia)	2013–2014	Rd. 1		Centre	35	8	14	0	60
103.	Una Mohi	(New Zealand)	2013–2014	Rd. 1		Centre, Second-row	29	5	0	0	20
104.	Cory McGrady	(Australia)	2013	Rd. 1		Five-eighth	6	4	0	0	16
105.	Billy Brittain	(Australia)	2013–2014	Rd. 1	South Sydney Rabbitohs (2019)	Halfback, Hooker	37	4	11	0	38
106.	Matthew Lodge	(Australia)	2013–2014	Rd. 1	Wests Tigers (2014)	Prop	21	6	0	0	24
107.	Aleki Falepaini		2013	Rd. 1		Second-row	4	1	0	0	4
**108.**	Christian Welch	(Australia)	2013–2014	Rd. 1	Melbourne Storm (2015)	Prop	38	4	0	0	16
109.	Brenden Treston	(Australia)	2013	Rd. 3		Second-row	22	2	0	0	8
110.	Francis Tualau	(Tonga)	2013–2014	Rd. 3	Canterbury Bulldogs (2017)	Prop	42	6	0	0	24
111.	Mitchell Moore	(Australia)	2013	Rd. 6		Hooker	3	0	0	0	0
112.	Brandon Manase		2013, 2015	Rd. 11		Centre	5	0	0	0	0
113.	Tremaine Jensen	(Cook Islands)	2013–2014	Rd. 15		Fullback	17	3	0	0	12
114.	Reubenn Rennie	(New Zealand) (Cook Islands)	2013–2014	Rd. 22		Centre	9	3	0	0	12
115.	Vincent Rennie	(New Zealand) (Cook Islands)	2013–2014	Rd. 25		Prop	13	0	0	0	0
116.	Max Fesolai		2013–2015	Rd. 26		Centre	18	2	5	0	18
117.	Tony Tumusa	(New Zealand)	2014–2015	Rd. 1		Wing	34	26	0	0	104
118.	Josh Cullen-Minhinnick	(Cook Islands)	2014–2015	Rd. 1		Centre	21	23	0	0	92
**119.**	Suliasi Vunivalu	(Fiji)	2014–2015	Rd. 1	Melbourne Storm (2016)	Wing	12	8	0	0	32
120.	Brayden Torpy	(Australia)	2014	Rd. 1		Five-eighth	21	0	16	0	32
121.	Jake Turpin	(Australia)	2014–2016	Rd. 1	Brisbane Broncos (2018)	Hooker, Halfback	43	9	0	1	37
122.	Aaron Teroi	(Australia) (Cook Islands)	2014–2015	Rd. 1		Hooker	17	0	0	0	0
**123.**	Nelson Asofa-Solomona	(New Zealand)	2014–2015	Rd. 1	Melbourne Storm (2015)	Prop	21	13	0	0	52
124.	Billy Kitt	(Australia)	2014	Rd. 1		Halfback	17	0	0	0	0
125.	John Filipo		2014–2015	Rd. 1		Second-row	20	2	0	0	8
**126.**	Cameron Munster	(Australia)	2014	Rd. 2	Melbourne Storm (2014)	Five-eighth	9	6	33	0	90
127.	Elias Vole		2014–2015	Rd. 2		Second-row	14	1	0	0	4
128.	Junior Kirisome		2014–2015	Rd. 3		Centre	34	16	0	0	64
129.	Charnze Nicoll-Klokstad	(New Zealand) (Cook Islands)	2014–2015	Rd. 3	New Zealand Warriors (2017)	Fullback, Centre	37	16	0	0	64
**130.**	Joe Stimson	(Australia)	2014–2015	Rd. 4	Melbourne Storm (2017)	Second-row	33	8	9	0	50
131.	Nathan Young		2014	Rd. 5			1	0	0	0	0
132.	Ellery Tusa		2014	Rd. 6		Centre	1	0	0	0	0
133.	Shae Ah Fook		2014	Rd. 7		Second-row	23	3	0	0	12
134.	Sheldon Pitama		2014	Rd. 8		Hooker	5	0	0	0	0
135.	Charlie Galo	(Australia)	2014–2016	Rd. 8		Prop, Second-row	53	16	0	0	64
136.	Ben Halfpenny		2014–2016	Rd. 9		Lock	14	0	0	0	0
137.	Kurt Bernard	(Niue)	2014–2015	Rd. 12		Prop	17	4	0	0	16
138.	Latrell Robinson		2014–2015	Rd. 13		Fullback, Wing	35	12	6	0	60
139.	Logan Houghton		2014–2015	Rd. 18		Second-row	15	4	0	0	16
140.	Aaron Presnell		2014	Rd. 23		Centre	1	1	0	0	4
141.	Chanel Seigafo		2015	Rd. 1		Wing	7	2	0	0	8
142.	Mack Mason	(Australia)	2015	Rd. 1		Five-eighth, Hooker	22	0	48	1	97
143.	Ben Nakubuwai	(Australia) (Fiji)	2015–2016	Rd. 1	Gold Coast Titans (2017)	Prop	42	3	0	0	12
144.	Connor Donehue	(United States)	2015–2016	Rd. 1		Hooker	34	7	0	0	28
145.	Jamayne Taunoa-Brown	(Australia)	2015	Rd. 1	New Zealand Warriors (2020)	Prop	19	0	0	0	0
146.	Brendan Frei	(Australia)	2015	Rd. 1		Lock	22	0	0	0	0
147.	Josh Kerr	(Australia)	2015–2016	Rd. 2	St George Illawarra Dragons (2019)	Prop	41	14	0	0	56
148.	Zion Ioka	(New Zealand)	2015	Rd. 3		Five-eighth	18	3	8	0	28
149.	Jerry Leasi		2015	Rd. 5		Wing	11	3	0	0	12
150.	Paula Fifita		2015	Rd. 15			2	1	0	0	4
151.	Melvin Fifita		2015	Rd. 15			1	0	0	0	0
152.	Aiden Taua		2015	Rd. 19			2	1	0	0	4
153.	George House		2015	Rd. 22		Halfback	2	0	0	0	0
154.	Angelo Leaupepe		2015–2016	Rd. 26		Centre	18	7	0	0	28
155.	Jesse Arthars	(New Zealand)	2016–2017	Rd. 1	Gold Coast Titans (2019)	Fullback	44	22	160	0	408
156.	Louis Geraghty	(Australia)	2016–2017	Rd. 1		Second-row	41	6	0	0	24
157.	Cory Parker		2016–2017	Rd. 1		Centre, Wing	32	21	0	0	84
158.	Joel Gittins		2016–2017	Rd. 1		Centre	15	5	0	0	20
159.	Nat McGavin	(Australia)	2016	Rd. 1		Wing	13	11	0	0	44
**160.**	Scott Drinkwater	(Australia)	2016–2017	Rd. 1	Melbourne Storm (2018)	Five-eighth, Fullback	29	23	8	0	108
**161.**	Brodie Croft	(Australia)	2016–2017	Rd. 1	Melbourne Storm (2016)	Halfback	12	5	0	0	20
162.	Jaiyden Hunt	(Australia)	2016–2017	Rd. 1	St George Illawarra Dragons (2021)	Second-row	29	4	0	0	16
163.	Jordan Remfrey		2016	Rd. 1		Second-row	10	1	0	0	4
164.	Jacob Elmore		2016–2017	Rd. 1		Lock	25	5	0	0	20
165.	Ben Henderson		2016	Rd. 1		Second-row	8	0	0	0	0
166.	Daymeric Pelo		2016	Rd. 1		Second-row	4	1	0	0	4
167.	Lachlan Timm	(Australia)	2016	Rd. 1		Second-row	23	3	0	0	12
168.	Matt Egan		2016–2017	Rd. 3		Halfback	35	7	0	0	28
169.	Jacob Tonge		2016–2017	Rd. 3		Centre, Second-row	33	22	0	0	88
170.	Riley Leota		2016	Rd. 3		Prop	17	1	0	0	4
171.	Beau Fermor	(Australia)	2016–2017	Rd. 3	Gold Coast Titans (2020)	Wing	27	11	0	0	44
172.	Jack Cornford		2016–2017	Rd. 4		Wing	12	2	2	0	12
173.	Sam Burns	(Australia)	2016	Rd. 5		Hooker	16	3	0	0	12
174.	Lachlan Foulds	(Australia)	2016–2017	Rd. 8		Prop	9	0	0	0	0
**175.**	Curtis Scott	(Australia)	2016–2017	Rd. 9	Melbourne Storm (2016)	Centre	2	1	0	0	4
176.	Taylor Walters		2016	Rd. 11		Wing	11	6	0	0	24
177.	Daniel Robinson		2016	Rd. 11			1	0	0	0	0
178.	Blake Mara		2016	Rd. 15			2	0	0	0	0
179.	Jack Cook		2016	Rd. 16		Five-eighth	3	0	0	0	0
180.	Caleb Daunt	(Australia)	2016–2017	Rd. 21		Hooker	18	0	0	0	0
181.	Jacob Boyce		2016	Rd. 22		Second-row	4	2	0	0	8
182.	Ishaq Lesa		2016	Rd. 26			1	0	0	0	0
**183.**	Harry Grant	(Australia)	2016-2017	Rd. 26	Melbourne Storm (2018)	Hooker	21	9	0	0	36
184.	Harlan Collins		2017	Rd. 1		Wing	20	9	0	0	36
185.	Sale Finau	(Samoa)	2017	Rd. 1		Centre	20	12	0	0	48
186.	Hayden Herbert		2017	Rd. 1		Five-eighth	10	2	2	0	12
187.	Clayton Dodt		2017	Rd. 1		Prop	18	0	0	0	0
188.	Taumautu Afemui-Nohotima		2017	Rd. 1		Prop	4	0	0	0	0
189.	Tevita Alifa		2017	Rd. 1		Lock	16	3	0	0	12
190.	Jirah Momoisea	(New Zealand)	2017	Rd. 1	Newcastle Knights (2021)	Prop	24	0	0	0	0
191.	Jake Ainsworth	(Australia)	2017	Rd. 1		Prop	19	0	0	0	0
192.	Isaak Pedersen	(New Zealand)	2017	Rd. 1		Prop	6	0	0	0	0
193.	Kea Pere		2017	Rd. 2		Wing	14	5	0	0	20
194.	Dale Madden		2017	Rd. 4		Second-row	17	3	0	0	12
195.	Braydon Trindall	(Australia)	2017	Rd. 5	Cronulla Sharks (2020)	Five-eighth	14	2	2	1	13
196.	William Toloi		2017	Rd. 6		Centre	8	3	0	0	12
197.	Dechlan Day		2017	Rd. 10		Prop	7	1	0	0	4
198.	Pio Nakubuwai		2017	Rd. 15		Wing	2	0	0	0	0
199.	Augustus Rangihuna		2017	Rd. 20		Fullback	4	1	0	0	4
**200.**	Tino Fa'asuamaleaui	(Australia) (Samoa)	2017	Rd. 24	Melbourne Storm (2019)	Prop	3	0	0	0	0
