= 2002 Melbourne Storm season =

- NRL Rank: 10th
- 2002 record: Wins: 9; draws: 1; losses: 14
- Points scored: For: 556; against: 586

Team information
- Executive Director: John Ribot
- Coach: Mark Murray
- Captain: Rodney Howe (11 matches) Robbie Kearns (8 matches) Stephen Kearney (5 matches)
- Stadium: Olympic Park
- Avg. attendance: 9,088 (Note: Regular season home matches in Melbourne only)
- High attendance: 12,044 (Round 1) (Note: Regular season home matches in Melbourne only)

Top scorers
- Tries: Aaron Moule (17)
- Goals: Matt Orford (62)
- Points: Matt Orford (156)
← 2001	List of seasons	2003 →

The 2002 Melbourne Storm season was the fifth in the club's history. They competed in the NRL's 2002 Telstra Premiership and finished the regular season in tenth place making it their lowest finishing position until 2010, when it was sentenced to finish that season last due to gross salary cap breaches. Until 2026, it was also the most recent time that the Storm missed the finals due to not winning enough matches. It was Mark Murray's final season as coach of the club.

In 2002 the Storm returned to Olympic Park. The club secured no big name player signings for the season as it kept under the NRL imposed salary cap. It was a "cosmopolitan" squad, with the top-25 list at the start of the season featuring 12 players from outside Australia, with players from England, Fiji, New Zealand, Papua New Guinea, Samoa, Tonga, and Wales.

In an effort to reignite its floundering success the return to its smaller home ground was seen by players and supporters as a positive move. Coach Mark Murray saying before the season: "The players are really pleased about the decision to go back there. I think they've got some really fond memories of the place. But, apart from that, they also missed the atmosphere that Olympic Park generates. I think we also lost our true home-ground advantage because the weather in Melbourne can be unpredictable. Teams coming down to play at Colonial knew the roof would be closed, knew the conditions would be firm and fast. You just lose that unpredictability of the conditions you're going to play in. I think that was a disadvantage for us. I think we're going to get some real spin-off from our home games at Olympic Park."

The club though continued to deliver hot and cold performances as the season progressed, leaving them on the fringe of the top eight (from only 15 competitors). The Storm suffered internal turmoil during the season, particularly when the captaincy was removed from Robbie Kearns and given to Rodney Howe. The Storm was also troubled over the renegotiation of club stalwart Richard Swain's contract — he reluctantly signed for Brisbane for 2003 when the Storm (citing salary cap issues) failed to make him an offer.

The Storm's season again came down to needing to win its final round game to reach the semi-finals. In a repeat of 2001, Melbourne appeared to lack enthusiasm when it mattered and again lost a crucial match.

== Season summary ==
- Preseason – Melbourne officials request to play most of their games at 3pm on Saturday afternoons, with matches broadcast live by Nine Melbourne.
- 1 February – Prop forward Rodney Howe was expected to miss the first ten weeks of the season due to complications following his knee and shoulder surgery.
- 16 February – Melbourne win a scrappy preseason trial match against Wests Tigers 30–18 at Gladstone, with triallist Alf Duncan scoring two tries. The club already had a growing injury list with Matt Orford, Robbie Ross, Aaron Moule, and Richard Swain all unavailable and struggling to be ready for the new season. Robbie Kearns was also added to the list after this match, sustaining a hip injury.
- 2 March – In their second trial match, the Storm lose 40–14 against the Dragons in Wagga Wagga.
- 12 March – Robbie Ross was ruled out for up to six weeks after needing surgery on a groin injury. Ross had been battling injury through the preseason and had developed osteitis pubis as a result of his troublesome hamstring and groin injuries.
- 13 March – Melbourne is fined A$90,000 for a breach of the 2001 NRL salary cap, with club officials vowing to fight the penalty. John Ribot arguing that the club had already been fined for the same breach.
- Round 1 – Storm defeat Canberra Raiders 16–12 in their return to Olympic Park, a disallowed try for obstruction causing consternation for Raiders' coach Matt Elliott. The match was originally scheduled for an afternoon kickoff, but was postponed until the unusual later time of 8:30pm due to athletics. Melbourne held a 14–12 half time lead, with the only points in the second half coming via a penalty goal in the final minutes of the match. New signings Mitchell Sargent, Shane Walker, Willie Leyshon, and Ian Sibbit all made their club debuts, with Sargent scoring Melbourne's first try of the season. Forward Peter Robinson was added to the club's injury list after x-ray scans revealed a badly broken thumb. Robinson had injured the same thumb before the start of the 2001 season.
- Round 2 – Up against former Storm coach Chris Anderson, Melbourne hand a debut to 18-year-old Michael Russo, but fell behind 20–6 against the Cronulla Sharks at half time. Melbourne recovered from 30–12 down during the second half, to set up a close finish, going down 30–24. Anderson saying his team "beat an average side today," with Stephen Kearney responding with saying: "that doesn't say too much for his side. That average side almost won."
- Round 3 – Without regular halfback Matt Orford, Melbourne thrash North Queensland Cowboys 38–10 with Scott Hill dangerous in attack to ease the pressure on debutant Marty Turner. Hill set up a number of tries, while Danny Williams made his 150th NRL appearance.
- 2 April – The thigh injury to Matt Orford was expected to keep him out until at least round 6.
- Round 4 – Melbourne stage a dramatic comeback to end Parramatta Eels 14-game undefeated run at Parramatta Stadium. Storm fight back from a 30–10 halftime deficit to win 32–30. The team scored three tries in the final 20 minutes of the match, with the winning try scored almost on full time as Danny Williams offloaded to Marcus Bai for the winger to score in the corner. Scott Hill injured his knee in the match, returning in the second half to play through the pain.
- 9 April – Michael Russo and Marty Turner are involved in a serious car accident near Geelong, returning from a surfing trip. Turner suffers fractured ribs, a ruptured spleen, severe concussion, and cuts and bruises. Russo escapes with an injured elbow and is able to return to play in round 6.
- Round 5 – With both Matt Orford and Marty Turner unavailable, Melbourne turn to 18-year-old hooker Cameron Smith to make his NRL debut at halfback in their match against the Bulldogs. In wet and slippery conditions, the team struggled against the visitors, looking disjointed in a 22–6 loss. Melbourne failed to score from a number of opportunities in the first half to fall behind 6–0. Only a late try to Ian Sibbit saving the Storm from being held pointless for the first time in club history. Willie Leyshon joined the club's injury list with a fractured checkbone. Before the match, CEO Chris Johns was involved in a heated discussion broadcast on Sydney radio station 2GB, with host Ray Hadley again suggesting that the Storm would fail in the long-term. In reply, Johns labelled the broadcaster a "peanut brain."
- Round 6 – Michael Russo scores a late try to seal a scrappy 12–4 win over St George Illawarra Dragons only 11 days after the car accident involving him and Marty Turner. Melbourne were forced to overcome more injuries with third-string halfback Cameron Smith injuring his knee during the game. The match marked Marcus Bai's 100th with the club, just the second player behind Richard Swain to reach that milestone.
- Round 7 – New Zealand Warriors claim the Michael Moore Trophy for the first time, beating Melbourne 20–10 in Auckland. The Storm fought back in the second half after they went to the break 14–0 down, but couldn't mount a come from behind victory.
- Round 8 – Newcastle Knights win their first match at Olympic Park, defeating Melbourne 36–28. The visitors raced to a 30–6 lead at halftime, but the returning Matt Orford narrowed the margin with two tries at the start of the second half. Victorian-born outside back Timana Tahu scored three tries for the Knights, with Mark Murray saying after the match "I'm pretty disappointed with the way we went about that first half, both in an effort-level sense and also our football. There was some really dumb stuff out there."
- 9 May – The NRL board confirms Melbourne's salary cap fine of A$90,000 will stand. The fine related to payments to Robbie Kearns and Rodney Howe after the appeared in an advertising campaign. John Ribot defended the club and criticised the NRL for a lack of support for the Storm and rugby league in Victoria, telling The Daily Telegraph: "I just want to know where the governing body is going with its expansion of the game. Because we are seen to be with News (Limited), everybody thinks everything is taken care of. That's not the case because News has a business to run too. I'm passionately committed to Melbourne and league down here and I've personally put more dollars into the club than I would care to think. We don't want money to spend on players under the A$3.5m salary cap. But there are other areas, like allowances for player location, that are vital to our survival. The AFL gives clubs up to A$500,000 to relocate players and for us, that sort of consideration would make the world of difference. This is not about a hand-out, it's about finding out if the NRL is fair dinkum about the game outside of Sydney and Brisbane."
- Round 9 – Missing Scott Hill and Robbie Kearns who had been injured in the previous evening's City vs Country Origin match, Melbourne struggled against the Sydney Roosters losing 34–6. Melbourne's only try came ten minutes before halftime through Junior Langi, but they were unable to hold off the home team in the second half.
- Round 10 – Trailing 22–20 with seconds remaining, referee Paul Simpkins awards a penalty against the Parramatta Eels for stripping the ball from Willie Leyshon, but Matt Orford missed a late penalty goal from 38m on a difficult angle, costing Melbourne a point. The loss, Melbourne's fourth in a row had the club teetering on the edge of the top eight.
- 24 May – Storm CEO Chris Johns admits spreading rumours that the club will relocate to Brisbane in order to extract further funding from the Victorian Government.
- Round 11 – Melbourne slump to a fifth straight defeat, the worst consecutive streak in club history. The Storm had led 12–8 at halftime, but faded badly in the second half against the New Zealand Warriors to lose 28–12, the club's third loss at Olympic Park for the season. Referee Mark Oaten put Willie Leyson in the sin bin for repeated ruck infringments during the second half, which added to Melbourne's problems missing both Stephen Kearney and Robbie Kearns through injury. The club was issued with a fine of A$10,000 following the match due to comments from Chris Johns about the referee.

I've had plenty of highs and lows throughout my career but this is easily the lowest point. I'm shattered, I know that I have always given 110 per cent as a player and a captain for this club, and no matter what I'll continue to do that.

— Robbie Kearns, after being dumped as club captain
- 31 May – Head coach Mark Murray makes the decision to dump captain Robbie Kearns, replacing him with Rodney Howe. Senior Melbourne players condemn the decision with Scott Hill suggesting that "senior players should have been consulted." Kearns later calls out the club for disloyalty at the decision to strip him of the captaincy, penning a four-page letter to the club. Storm officials were adament that the move would not destabilise the club, despite the decision coming in the midst of a losing streak, Chris Johns saying that "the players are there to play football games. I think the whole focus is that the football department makes the right decision and then, hopefully, the performances are going to justify the decisions that we've made." Mark Murray later conceding to the media "I played as much a role in the decision as anybody else. It was made at coaching level and discussed at the administrative level. It wasn't a decision taken lightly by the club but made in the best interests of the club. It is something we did and stand by. The time was right for a change and it is an in-house issue from here."
- Round 13 – With new captain Rodney Howe carried off with severe concussion in the first ten minutes, Melbourne fall to their sixth straight defeat, losing 37–16 against the Knights away at Newcastle. Mark Murray at odds with referee Mark Oaten's 15–6 penalty count and a number of crucial decisions during the match. The loss saw the club fall to 11th on the NRL ladder. Following the match, Mark Murray cleared the air with Mark Oaten and referee's boss Peter Louis, with the NRL officials "pretty helpful in tipping a couple (Storm) players that can work on their bad habits as well" after Oaten had penalised Melbourne players for ruck infringements and for being offside.
- 12 June – Matt Rua was ruled out for up to eight weeks following surgery on a dislocated finger. Rua sustained the injury in the club's round 11 loss and had tried to play with the injury strapped.
- 14 June – In a scathing editorial, The Daily Telegraph columnist Phil Rothfield called for the Melbourne Storm to be replaced by a Central Coast team based in Gosford. Writing that "the NRL refuses to give the Coast the priority it deserves and instead sticks with Melbourne Storm, despite terrible TV ratings in Victoria and an alarming slump in crowds."
- Round 14 – Prop forward Shane Walker is sent off for a high swinging arm tackle that knocks out St George Illawarra Dragons prop forward Jason Ryles. Melbourne gain their first competition point since April, holding out for a 30–all draw. Matt Orford scored two tries, but the Storm were lucky to escape with a point after the Dragons missed two field goal attempts in the final minutes.
- 16 June – Reports emerge that Melbourne are having difficulty in retaining hooker Richard Swain.
- Round 15 – Melbourne win their first match in two months, thrashing the South Sydney Rabbitohs 44–6 in the first match between the teams since 1999. Matt Orford had a stand-out performance in the match, setting up four of the Storm's seven tries. Melbourne led by just 12–6 at halftime, smashing Souths in the second half, with Robbie Kearns scoring a stirring try.
- 24 June – It's confirmed that Rodney Howe will be missing for at least a month of matches after having a plate installed to repair a shattered eye socket. Howe suffered the injury in round 13, but played in round 14 against medical advice.
- Round 16 – After was reported during the week that just 13 tickets were sold for Melbourne's match against the Northern Eagles at North Power Stadium, the match was relocated to Brookvale Oval. Melbourne unable to maintain their form, going down 36–22 even after leading 16–8 at halftime, with Richard Swain apologising to supporters "it felt terrible. I feel sorry for the people that had to watch it. We were embarrassing, we knew it. I think we went eight or nine weeks without a win. We win one game and we're straight back to where we were three weeks ago." Robbie Ross suffered a torn calf muscle in the first half, to be again on the club's injury list.
- 30 June – Negotiations break down between Melbourne and Richard Swain, with the hooker now free to entertain offers from rival clubs. His manager Daryl Mather had thought Swain was "99.9 per cent" certain he would stay in Melbourne colours beyond the end of the season, but was now "less certain."
- Round 17 – The Storm kept their finals hopes alive with a 26–20 win over the Wests Tigers. Melbourne held a 26–8 lead until two late tries brought the final margin back to six points.
- Round 18 – Melbourne stun fifth-placed Sydney Roosters 48–10 at Olympic Park, to score the club's highest score for the season. The team scored nine tries in the victory, with Marcus Bai and Aaron Moule each scoring twice. The Roosters scored first, but Melbourne scored 28 unanswered points with a stiff breeze behind them to take a commanding halftime lead. Halfback Matt Orford praised the team following a near faultless performance "it wasn't that big a deal, everyone just did their jobs like we plan to do every week and it came off. We clicked today and there's no reason why we can't do that every week, I think we're back for sure." Matt Geyer was injured in the match, suffering a broken collarbone after Roosters centre Justin Hodges landed awkwardly on top of Geyer. It was feared that the injury would keep Geyer out for the rest of the season.

Some people might not like the decisions we make but we can't cater for five or six senior players. We have to cater for the club's interests. If we had kept Richard (Swain) on his price, one or two senior players had to go and there would be no young kids being signed.

— John Ribot, July 2002
- 23 July – Melbourne announce that Richard Swain will not be at the club in 2003 after withdrawing any contract offer. Swain was said to be devasted by the announcement telling the media "I'm enormously disappointed. I never thought I'd be leaving. It's the loyalty thing; you expect to be treated a bit better," while Chris Johns called it "the toughest decision the club has had to make, Richard has been a role model. We've been in breach of the salary cap for the last two years trying to hold onto the talent fostered, we're determined not to be fined again." At the same time, the club announced the signing of Brisbane Broncos rookie Robert Tanielu for 2003, and re-signings of Junior Langi, Kirk Reynoldson, and Cameron Smith.
- 24 July – St Gregory's College schoolboys football star Ryan Hoffman signs with the Storm for two years.
- 25 July – Robbie Kearns was ruled out for the rest of the season after confirming that he would require surgery on his chronic ankle injury. Canberra Raiders confirm they have signed Storm forward Matt Rua for 2003. Rua had been offered a contract by Melbourne in June that was "well below" his previous contract value.
- Round 20 – Despite scoring the first try, Melbourne stumble badly against the Penrith Panthers falling behind 24–4 in the first half of their match at Penrith Stadium. Melbourne got within eight points during the second half, but a controversial decision from referee Bill Harrigan and some panic-ridden play saw the Panthers clear to a 36–16 win. The loss, and the club's position on the ladder led to speculation that coach Mark Murray was under pressure, with John Ribot saying: "I have no problems (with Murray) at the moment. Things are not great on the field but there are reasons for that, not least our worst injury toll in five years." Due to a jersey clash, Melbourne wore their 1999-2000 gold-coloured clash jersey, but were issued with a A$3,000 breach notice as the jerseys were missing the Telstra Premiership logos.
- 1 August – Brisbane Broncos sign Richard Swain to a one-year contract for 2003.
- Round 21 – The Brisbane Broncos hand Melbourne a humbling 48–20 defeat at Olympic Park, the Storm scoring two consolation tries late in the match. Robbie Ross (hamstring), Matt Orford (hip/thigh) and Rodney Howe (broken hand) all suffered injuries in the match. Howe saying: "I think it was just a pretty inept performance. It's the time of the year that we've got to perform and we're basically just not showing up to play." Before the match a fiery fan forum was held at Hisense Arena with over 500 Storm fans in attendance asking questions of John Ribot and NRL Chief Operating Officer Graham Annesley. Storm fans later holding up a banner inside Olympic Park: "Johns, how do U spell loyalty? We spell it SWAIN."
- 4 August – In an interview with the Courier Mail, Richard Swain criticised Chris Johns and John Ribot for the way they handled his contract negotiations. He revealed that it was left to senior players to tell him that he wouldn't be receiving a new contract after the club revoked their final offer, a claim that was denied by Johns.

This club had a lot of success early on and even with our results over the past few years we're still by far the most successful club to come into the competition in its first five years. Part of keeping that level of success is making some long-term plans for the future. This club is five years old and it's probably time we went through that sort of process to ensure the club is still competitive in the coming years

— Mark Murray, August 2002
- 10 August – Chris Johns accused rival clubs of trying to destabilise the Storm telling the media "I accept that there's probably some reason for people to talk about what's happened with Swainy, but the continual rumours about our viability and Scott Hill leaving are just totally unfounded. This seems to happen every year. We're rolling along all right and things are fine, and then all of a sudden the rumours begin about the club's viability and players wanting to leave and they're all unsubstantiated. It's coming from somewhere, and obviously because of what happened in Super League with John and myself there are agendas there to discredit us. I think some clubs in Sydney are trying to put pressure on us for reasons that are unbeknown to me maybe it's just a hangover [from the Super League war] or maybe we've achieved a little too much success too soon for some of the other clubs. But if they really don't want us in the competition, stand up and try and kick us out."
- Round 22 – Melbourne keep their finals hopes alive with a 40–30 win over the North Queensland Cowboys in Townsville. Steven Bell crossed for two tries in the match, played in hot and windy conditions. Rookie forward Kirk Reynoldson hoped the win would spur the team on: "We played as a team and helped each other in defence. It was good to win, but it was just more fun. There was a great feeling among the boys." Departing hooker Richard Swain was among Melbourne's best, showing his professionalism despite the turmoil of the previous few weeks.
- Round 23 – In the club's final home match of the season, Richard Swain said farewell to the Storm fans as the club offered discounted tickets to AFL members in an effort to increase crowd numbers. Swain was pivotal in Melbourne's 42–10 win over Penrith, with the club also celebrating 100 matches for both Scott Hill and Aaron Moule, with Moule scoring three tries in the match. The result had Melbourne inside the final eight with three away matches to come.
- 22 August – In the wake of the exposure of the Bulldogs breaches of the NRL salary cap, the NRL rebukes Storm coach Mark Murray who had commented that "I have no doubt they (the Bulldogs) are not alone. I think a few clubs are under a bit of pressure. It’s a tricky area" when discussing the matter with the media. NRL CEO David Gallop saying in response "I have spoken to Melbourne chief executive Chris Johns about Murray's unsubstantiated allegations. I have reminded him that anyone in the league could be held to be in breach of the rules by bringing the game into disrepute with such comments as those made by his coach. Murray should either provide substance to the claims or desist from making them. If that sort of thing persists we would have to consider sending breach notices to offending clubs."
- 23 August – With the Bulldogs fined A$500,000 and stripped 37 competition points, Melbourne moved to sixth on the ladder ahead of their final run of matches all away from Olympic Park.
- Round 24 – Down 12–10 at half time, Melbourne were unable to get in front of the Wests Tigers to fall to a 26–16 defeat at Leichhardt Oval. Only 5,287 fans attended the match played in poor weather, the fewest number of people to watch a Storm match since the club's inception. Mark Murry conceding the loss had "done our finals chances a hell of a lot of damage. We looked like our attitude was back over the past two weeks and to see that out there was very disappointing. I'm trying to work out what's going on."
- Round 25 – After making a number changes to the team to account for players returning from injury including Robbie Ross and Matt Geyer, Melbourne continued to struggle in their away matches for the season. In their only Friday night match of the season, the Storm were unable to hold off a fired-up Bulldogs team to lose 24–16 in an error-ridden match. Melbourne had the lead with 20 minutes remaining up 16–12, but conceded two tries to slip out of the top eight spots on the NRL ladder.
- Round 26 – Needing a win to sneak into the NRL finals, Melbourne fall short against Canberra Raiders for the second consecutive year in the final round of the season. The loss saw the club finish tenth, their worst finish in their fifth season in the competition.

His (Mark Murray) sacrifice should not be interpreted as the sole reason we have not done well the past two years. The players must put their hands up and take some responsibility, just as the management must do the same.

— Chris Johns, following the sacking of Mark Murray
- 11 September – Mark Murray is sacked as Melbourne coach after missing the finals for the second consecutive season. Former captain Robbie Kearns telling the media "we had different views on a number of things, especially the captaincy, and we weren't the best of mates but you don't like to see anyone get sacked. He was always up front, he didn't hide behind anything and you've got to respect that in a person. Towards the end we were starting to talk a bit and I feel sorry for the bloke."
- 12 September – Five-eighth Scott Hill claims former coach Mark Murray treated players like school children, saying "the way Muppet (Mark Murray) handled himself around the players was not as a coach but more as a school teacher. He got on the wrong side of a few of the players because of the way he went about things. We should have won more games but fellas' minds were elsewhere and you can't afford to have that sort of thing with the side we've got. My form's been down and I guess the style of Muppett's play just wasn't quite right for me."
- 18 September – Brisbane Broncos performance director Craig Bellamy is appointed new head coach of Melbourne, signing a two-year contract. Bellamy had been at the Broncos for five seasons as an assistant coach to Wayne Bennett. Following the announcement, Rodney Howe stood down as club captain to allow the club to have a fresh start under Bellamy.
- 4 October – Chris Johns resigns as Melbourne Storm CEO to return to Queensland, leaving the club after more than five years in Melbourne.
- 11 October – Up to 19 Melbourne players were fortunate not to be in Bali on their end of season trip when the Bali bombings occurred. The players were due to arrive in Bali before the bombings, but Danny Williams had changed their flight a month before "to save money."
- 12 November – Parramatta Eels CEO Denis Fitzgerald again calls for the Melbourne Storm to be axed from the NRL saying that the club had "not captured the imagination of the Victorian people. The club is costing News Limited a fortune to keep running. And I don't see any improvement as far as income or corporate support. John Ribot called Fitzgerald's comments stupid and ludicrous.

=== Milestone games ===
Round	Player	Milestone
Round 1	Ian Sibbit	Storm debut
Round 1	Shane Walker	Storm debut
Round 1	Mitchell Sargent	NRL debut
Round 1	William Leyshon	Storm debut
Round 2	Michael Russo	NRL debut
Round 3	Danny Williams	150th game
Round 3	Marty Turner	NRL debut
Round 4	Matt Geyer	100th game
Round 5	Cameron Smith	NRL debut
Round 7	Kirk Reynoldson	NRL debut
Round 8	Stephen Kearney	200th game
Round 11	Keith Mason	Storm debut
Round 13	Aaron Moule	100th game
Round 25	Matt Rua	100th game

=== Jerseys ===
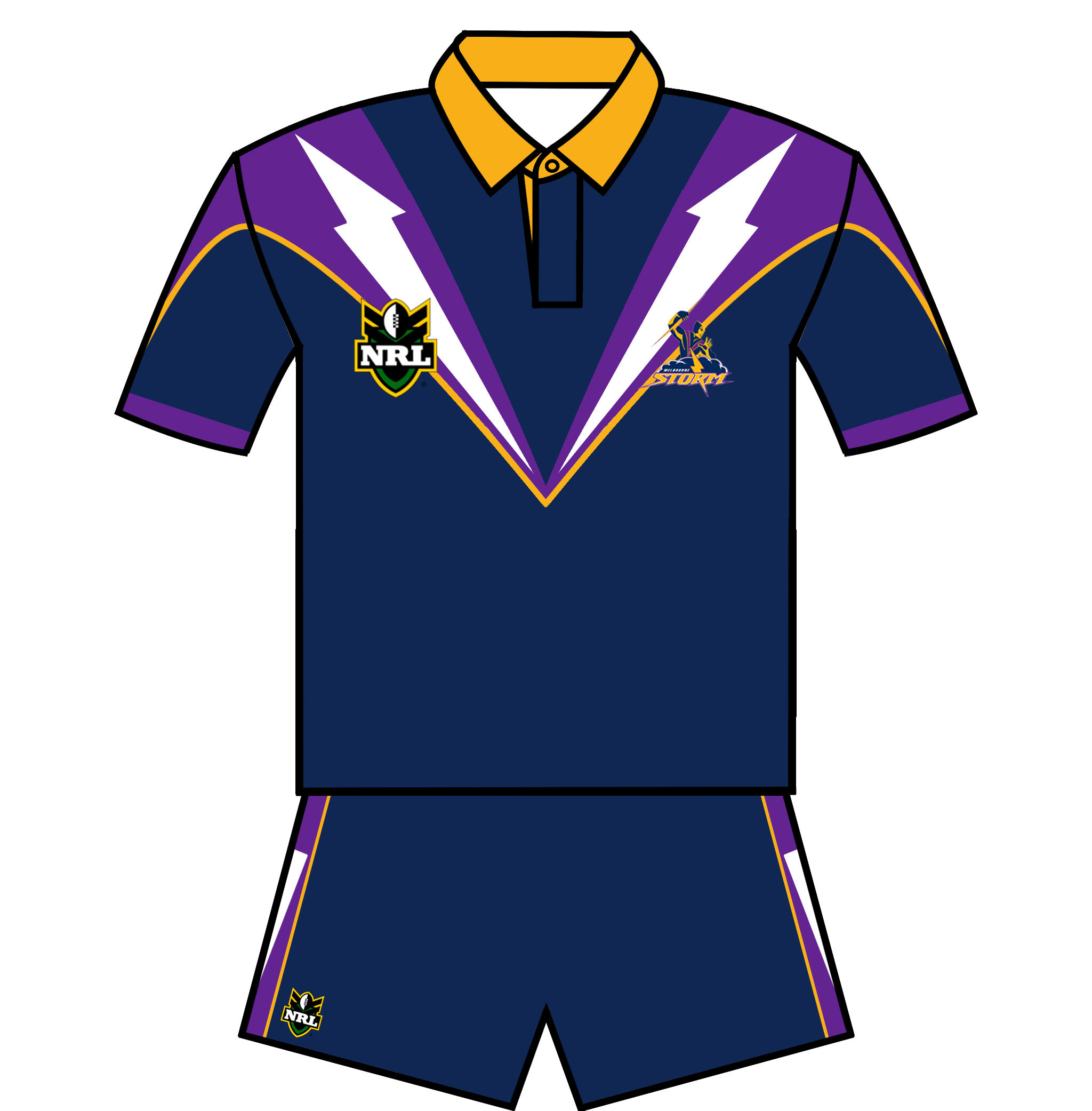
2002 home jersey

Melbourne's jerseys were again manufactured by Fila and unchanged from the designs worn in 2001. The player names on the backs of jerseys were dropped in favour of front of jersey advertiser Adecco. The quirk of the season came in both round 7 against the New Zealand Warriors and round 20 against Penrith Panthers as due to a jersey clashes, Melbourne wore the 1999–2000 gold clash jersey. However, the club was subsequently issued with a $3,000 breach notice after the match against Penrith, as the jerseys were missing the Telstra Premiership logos.

This was the last season Fila was associated with rugby league, after the company experienced financial difficulties.

== Fixtures ==
=== Preseason ===
Date	Rd	Opponent	Venue	Result	Mel.	Opp.	Tries	Goals	Field goals	Ref
16 February	Trial	Wests Tigers	Marley Brown Oval, Gladstone	Won	30	18	A Duncan (2), K Mason, P Whatuira, S Bell, S Walker	M Turner (1), M Geyer (2)		
2 March	Trial	St George Illawarra Dragons	Eric Weissel Oval, Wagga Wagga	Lost	14	40	S Bell (2), P Robinson	M Turner (1)		

=== Regular season ===
==== Result by round ====
Round	1	2	3	4	5	6	7	8	9	10	11	12	13	14	15	16	17	18	19	20	21	22	23	24	25	26
Ground	H	A	H	A	H	H	A	H	A	H	H	–	A	A	H	A	H	H	–	A	H	A	H	A	A	A
Result	W	L	W	W	L	W	L	L	L	L	L	B	L	D	W	L	W	W	B	L	L	W	W	L	L	L
Position	7	9	5	3	7	5	7	8	8	10	10	9	11	11	10	11	10	9	8	9	10	9	7	8	9	10
Points	2	2	4	6	6	8	8	8	8	8	8	10	10	11	13	13	15	17	19	19	19	21	23	23	23	23

Source: Rugby League Tables
A = Away; H = Home; N = Neutral; B = Bye; W = Win; D = Draw; L = Loss

==== Matches ====
Date	Rd	Opponent	Venue	Result	Mel.	Opp.	Tries	Goals	Field goals	Ref
16 March	1	Canberra Raiders	Olympic Park, Melbourne	Won	16	12	M Bai, M Sargent	M Orford 4/4		
23 March	2	Cronulla-Sutherland Sharks	Toyota Park, Sydney	Lost	24	30	S Bell (2), R Kearns, M Orford	M Orford 4/4		
30 March	3	North Queensland Cowboys	Olympic Park, Melbourne	Won	38	10	S Bell (2), M Bai, M Geyer, A Moule, H Perenara, M Rua, D Williams	M Turner 3/8		
6 April	4	Parramatta Eels	Parramatta Stadium, Sydney	Won	32	30	S Kearney (2), M Bai, S Hill, A Moule, R Swain	M Turner 4/6		
13 April	5	Canterbury-Bankstown Bulldogs	Olympic Park, Melbourne	Lost	6	22	I Sibbit	R Swain 1/1		
20 April	6	St George Illawarra Dragons	Olympic Park, Melbourne	Won	12	4	J Langi, M Russo	R Swain 2/2, C Smith 0/1		
27 April	7	New Zealand Warriors	Ericsson Stadium, Auckland	Lost	10	20	S Hill, A Moule	R Swain 1/2		
4 May	8	Newcastle Knights	Olympic Park, Melbourne	Lost	28	36	M Orford (2), S Kearney, A Moule, K Reynoldson	R Swain 4/5		
11 May	9	Sydney Roosters	Aussie Stadium, Sydney	Lost	6	34	J Langi	R Swain 1/1		
18 May	10	Parramatta Eels	Olympic Park, Melbourne	Lost	20	22	W Leyshon (2), A Moule, K Reynoldson	R Swain 2/4, M Orford 0/2		
25 May	11	New Zealand Warriors	Olympic Park, Melbourne	Lost	12	28	M Orford, R Ross	M Orford 2/2		
1 June	12	Bye								
8 June	13	Newcastle Knights	EnergyAustralia Stadium, Newcastle	Lost	16	37	A Moule, R Ross	M Orford 4/4		
15 June	14	St George Illawarra Dragons	WIN Stadium, Wollongong	Draw	30	30	M Orford (2), W Leyshon, R Swain, D Williams	M Orford 5/6		
22 June	15	South Sydney Rabbitohs	Olympic Park, Melbourne	Won	44	6	A Moule (2), R Kearns, J Langi, H Perenara, R Ross, M Russo	M Orford 8/9		
29 June	16	Northern Eagles	Brookvale Oval, Sydney (Note: Match originally scheduled to be played at NorthPower Stadium, Gosford)	Lost	22	36	J Langi, P Robinson, R Ross, R Swain	M Orford 3/4		
6 July	17	Wests Tigers	Olympic Park, Melbourne	Won	26	20	W Leyshon (2), S Bell, M Geyer, R Kearns	M Orford 3/5		
13 July	18	Sydney Roosters	Olympic Park, Melbourne	Won	48	10	M Bai (2), A Moule (2), S Kearney, W Leyshon, M Orford, P Robinson, S Tadulala	M Orford 5/8, W Leyshon 1/1		
20 July	19	Bye								
27 July	20	Penrith Panthers	Penrith Park, Sydney	Lost	16	36	A Moule, R Ross, S Tadulala	M Orford 2/3		
3 August	21	Brisbane Broncos	Olympic Park, Melbourne	Lost	20	48	M Bai, A Moule, R Ross, R Swain	M Orford 2/4		
10 August	22	North Queensland Cowboys	Dairy Farmers Stadium, Townsville	Won	40	30	S Bell (2), S Kearney, A Moule, M Orford, I Sibbit, R Swain	M Orford 6/8		
17 August	23	Penrith Panthers	Olympic Park, Melbourne	Won	42	10	A Moule (3), S Bell (2), S Hill, F Moala	M Orford 6/6, R Swain 1/1		
24 August	24	Wests Tigers	Leichhardt Oval, Sydney	Lost	16	26	M Bai, S Bell, S Hill	M Orford 2/3		
30 August	25	Canterbury-Bankstown Bulldogs	Sydney Showground, Sydney	Lost	16	24	M Geyer, I Sibbit	M Orford 4/4		
7 September	26	Canberra Raiders	Bruce Stadium, Canberra	Lost	16	25	M Bai (2), A Moule	M Orford 2/3		

== Ladder ==
2002 NRL season
Pos	Team	Pld	W	D	L	B	PF	PA	PD	Pts	Qualification
1	New Zealand Warriors	24	17	0	7	2	688	454	+234	38	Advance to finals series
2	Newcastle Knights	24	17	0	7	2	724	498	+226	38	Advance to finals series
3	Brisbane Broncos	24	16	1	7	2	672	425	+247	37	Advance to finals series
4	Sydney Roosters (P)	24	15	1	8	2	621	405	+216	35	Advance to finals series
5	Cronulla-Sutherland Sharks	24	15	0	9	2	653	597	+56	34	Advance to finals series
6	Parramatta Eels	24	10	2	12	2	531	440	+91	26	Advance to finals series
7	St. George Illawarra Dragons	24	9	3	12	2	632	546	+86	25	Advance to finals series
8	Canberra Raiders	24	10	1	13	2	471	641	−170	25	Advance to finals series
9	Northern Eagles	24	10	0	14	2	503	740	−237	24	
10	Melbourne Storm	24	9	1	14	2	556	586	−30	23	
11	North Queensland Cowboys	24	8	0	16	2	496	803	−307	20	
12	Penrith Panthers	24	7	0	17	2	546	654	−108	18	
13	Wests Tigers	24	7	0	17	2	498	642	−144	18	
14	South Sydney Rabbitohs	24	5	0	19	2	385	817	−432	14	
15	Canterbury-Bankstown Bulldogs	24	20	1	3	2	707	435	+272	8 (Note: The Bulldogs were deducted 37 premiership points due to gross salary cap breaches.)	

Source: National Rugby League RLP
Rules for classification: 1) competition points; 2) points differential
(P) Premiers

== 2002 Coaching Staff ==
- Head coach: Mark Murray
- Assistant coach: Anthony Griffin
- Football Manager: Greg Brentnall
- Physical Preparation Coach: Dave Darbyshire
- Physiotherapist: Greg Gibson
- Sports Trainer: Troy Thompson
- Recruitment manager: Peter O'Sullivan

== 2002 squad ==
List current as of 11 August 2021

Cap (Note: Players are listed with the cap number as they appear on the Melbourne Storm honour board. Additional squad members do not have a cap number.)	Nat.	Player name	Position	First Storm Game	Previous First Grade RL club (Note: This column denotes the previous RL club the player was signed to and played first grade RL for. If they are yet to debut then this is stipulated. If they were merely signed to the club but did not play then it is not counted.)
1	(Australia)	Robbie Ross	FB	1998	(Australia) Hunter Mariners
3	(Australia)	Aaron Moule	WG, CE	1998	(Australia) South Queensland Crushers
5	(Papua New Guinea)	Marcus Bai	WG	1998	(Australia) Gold Coast Chargers
6	(Australia)	Scott Hill	FE	1998	(Australia) Hunter Mariners
8	(Australia)	Rodney Howe	PR	1998	(Australia) Perth Reds
9	(Australia)	Danny Williams	LK, SR, HK	1998	(Australia) North Sydney Bears
10	(Australia)	Robbie Kearns	PR	1998	(Australia) Perth Reds
15	(New Zealand)	Richard Swain	HK	1998	(Australia) Hunter Mariners
18	(Australia)	Matt Geyer	WG	1998	(Australia) Perth Reds
26	(New Zealand)	Matt Rua	PR, SR	1998	(Australia) Melbourne Storm
28	(New Zealand)	Stephen Kearney	SR	1999	(Australia) New Zealand Warriors
34	(Tonga)	Fifita Moala	WG	2000	(Australia) Melbourne Storm
35	(Australia)	Brook Martin	WG	2000	(Australia) Melbourne Storm
37	(New Zealand)	Glen Turner	SR	2000	(Australia) Melbourne Storm
38	(Australia)	Peter Robinson	SR	2000	(Australia) Melbourne Storm
42	(New Zealand)	Junior Langi	CE	2001	(Australia) St George Illawarra Dragons
43	(Australia)	Matt Orford	HB	2001	(Australia) Northern Eagles
44	(Australia)	Steven Bell	CE	2001	(Australia) Melbourne Storm
46	(New Zealand)	Henry Perenara	LK	2001	(New Zealand) Auckland Warriors
48	(Fiji)	Semi Tadulala	WG	2001	(Australia) Melbourne Storm
49	(England)	Ian Sibbit	SR	2002	(England) Warrington Wolves
50	(Australia)	Shane Walker	PR	2002	(Australia) Wests Tigers
51	(Australia)	Mitchell Sargent	PR	2002	(Australia) Melbourne Storm
52	(Australia)	William Leyshon	LK	2002	(Australia) Northern Eagles
53	(Australia)	Michael Russo	SR	2002	(Australia) Melbourne Storm
54	(New Zealand)	Marty Turner	HB	2002	(Australia) Melbourne Storm
55	(Australia)	Cameron Smith	HK	2002	(Australia) Melbourne Storm
56	(Australia)	Kirk Reynoldson	SR	2002	(Australia) Melbourne Storm
57	(England)	Keith Mason	PR	2002	(England) Wakefield Trinity Wildcats
—	(Australia)	Alf Duncan	WG	Yet to Debut	(Australia) Manly Warringah Sea Eagles
—	(Australia)	Sam Fillery	SR	Yet to Debut	(Australia) Melbourne Storm
—	(Australia)	Dallas Johnson	LK	Yet to Debut	(Australia) Melbourne Storm
—	(Australia)	Nick Walker	PR	Yet to Debut	(Australia) Melbourne Storm

== Player movements ==
Losses

- Russell Bawden to London Broncos
- Tasesa Lavea to Northern Eagles
- Brett O'Farrell to Released
- Brenton Pomery to Released
- Ben Roarty to Penrith Panthers
- Paul Sheedy to New South Wales Waratahs (rugby)
- Brad Watts to South Sydney Rabbitohs
- Paul Whatuira to Penrith Panthers (midseason)

Gains

- Alf Duncan from Uncontracted (Note: Last played NRL with Manly Warringah Sea Eagles in 1999)
- William Leyshon from Northern Eagles
- Keith Mason from Wakefield Trinity Wildcats
- Mitchell Sargent from Parramatta Eels
- Ian Sibbit from Warrington Wolves
- Shane Walker from Wests Tigers

== Representative honours ==
This table lists all players who have played a representative match in 2002.

Player	City vs Country Origin	State of Origin 1	State of Origin 2	State of Origin 3	Midseason Test (Note: Test between Australia vs Great Britain)	October Tests (Note: Test between Australia vs New Zealand, forming part of the 2002 New Zealand rugby league tour)
Matt Geyer	City	—N/a	—N/a	—N/a	—N/a	—N/a
Scott Hill	Country	—N/a	New South Wales	New South Wales	Australia	Australia
Stephen Kearney	—N/a	—N/a	—N/a	—N/a	—N/a	New Zealand
Robbie Kearns	City (c)	—N/a	—N/a	—N/a	—N/a	—N/a
Keith Mason	—N/a	—N/a	—N/a	—N/a	—N/a	Wales
Richard Swain	—N/a	—N/a	—N/a	—N/a	—N/a	New Zealand

== Statistics ==
This table contains playing statistics for all Melbourne Storm players to have played in the 2002 NRL season.

- Statistics sources:

Name	Appearances	Tries	Goals	Field goals	Points
Marcus Bai	24	9	0	0	36
Steven Bell	15	10	0	0	40
Matt Geyer	19	3	0	0	12
Scott Hill	21	4	0	0	16
Rodney Howe	14	0	0	0	0
Stephen Kearney	23	5	0	0	20
Robbie Kearns	13	3	0	0	12
Junior Langi	22	4	0	0	16
William Leyshon	22	6	1	0	26
Keith Mason	1	0	0	0	0
Fifita Moala	6	1	0	0	4
Aaron Moule	21	17	0	0	68
Matt Orford	19	8	62	0	156
Henry Perenara	12	2	0	0	8
Kirk Reynoldson	17	2	0	0	8
Peter Robinson	17	2	0	0	8
Robbie Ross	11	6	0	0	24
Matt Rua	17	1	0	0	4
Michael Russo	9	2	0	0	8
Mitchell Sargent	12	1	0	0	4
Ian Sibbit	20	3	0	0	12
Cameron Smith	2	0	0	0	0
Richard Swain	24	5	12	0	44
Semi Tadulala	3	2	0	0	8
Marty Turner	2	0	7	0	14
Shane Walker	18	0	0	0	0
Danny Williams	23	2	0	0	8
27 players used	—	98	82	0	556

=== Scorers ===
Most points in a game: 18 points

- Round 14 - Matt Orford (2 tries, 5 goals) vs St George Illawarra Dragons

Most tries in a game: 3

- Round 20 - Aaron Moule vs Penrith Panthers

=== Winning games ===
Highest score in a winning game: 48 points

- Round 18 vs Sydney Roosters

Lowest score in a winning game: 12 points

- Round 6 vs St George Illawarra Dragons

Greatest winning margin: 38 points

- Round 15 vs South Sydney Rabbitohs
- Round 18 vs Sydney Roosters

Greatest number of games won consecutively: 2

- Round 3 - Round 4
- Round 17 - Round 18
- Round 22 - Round 23

=== Losing games ===
Highest score in a losing game: 28 points

- Round 8 vs Newcastle Knights

Lowest score in a losing game: 6 points

- Round 9 vs Sydney Roosters

Greatest losing margin: 28 points

- Round 9 vs Sydney Roosters
- Round 21 vs Brisbane Broncos

Greatest number of games lost consecutively: 6 (Note: New club record)

- Round 7 - Round 13

=== NRL Judiciary ===
A number of Melbourne players were cited by the match review committee for incidents through the 2002 season, with the following results from the NRL Judiciary.

Round	Player	Offence & grade	Result (Note: 100 demerit points equals one match suspension.)	Ref
Round 2	Danny Williams	Careless high tackle (Grade 2)	No matches (93 demerit points)	
Round 3	Mitchell Sargent	Careless high tackle (Grade 1)	No matches (56 demerit points)	
Round 4	Ian Sibbit	Careless high tackle (Grade 1)	No matches (56 demerit points)	
Round 6	Danny Williams	Careless high tackle (Grade 2)	Not guilty	
Round 14	Shane Walker	Reckless high tackle (Grade 2)	3 matches (393 demerit points)	
Round 25	Danny Williams	Careless high tackle (Grade 3)	2 matches (289 demerit points)	
Round 25	Junior Langi	Dangerous throw (Grade 1)	1 match (112 demerit points)	

== Feeder Team ==
Melbourne Storm reserve players again travelled to Brisbane each week to play with Queensland Cup team Norths Devils. Terry Matterson continued as coach after he took over the role in 2001. Making the finals for the fifth straight season, Norths Devils finished fifth, and won through to the preliminary final of the 2002 Queensland Cup. Melbourne Storm rookie Cameron Smith won the Devils Player of the Year Award.

2002 Queensland Cup
Pos	Team	Pld	W	D	L	PF	PA	PD	Pts
5	Norths Devils	22	14	0	8	774	441	+363	28

== Awards and honours ==
=== Melbourne Storm Awards Night ===
Held at Melbourne Park on Friday, 11 October:

- Melbourne Storm Player of the Year: Rodney Howe
- Melbourne Storm Rookie of the year: Michael Russo
- Melbourne Storm Clubman of the Year: Matt Geyer
- Mick Moore Chairman's Award: Chris Johns
- Hit of the Year: Willie Leyshon
