= Jayden Walker =

Italy international rugby league footballer (born 1996)

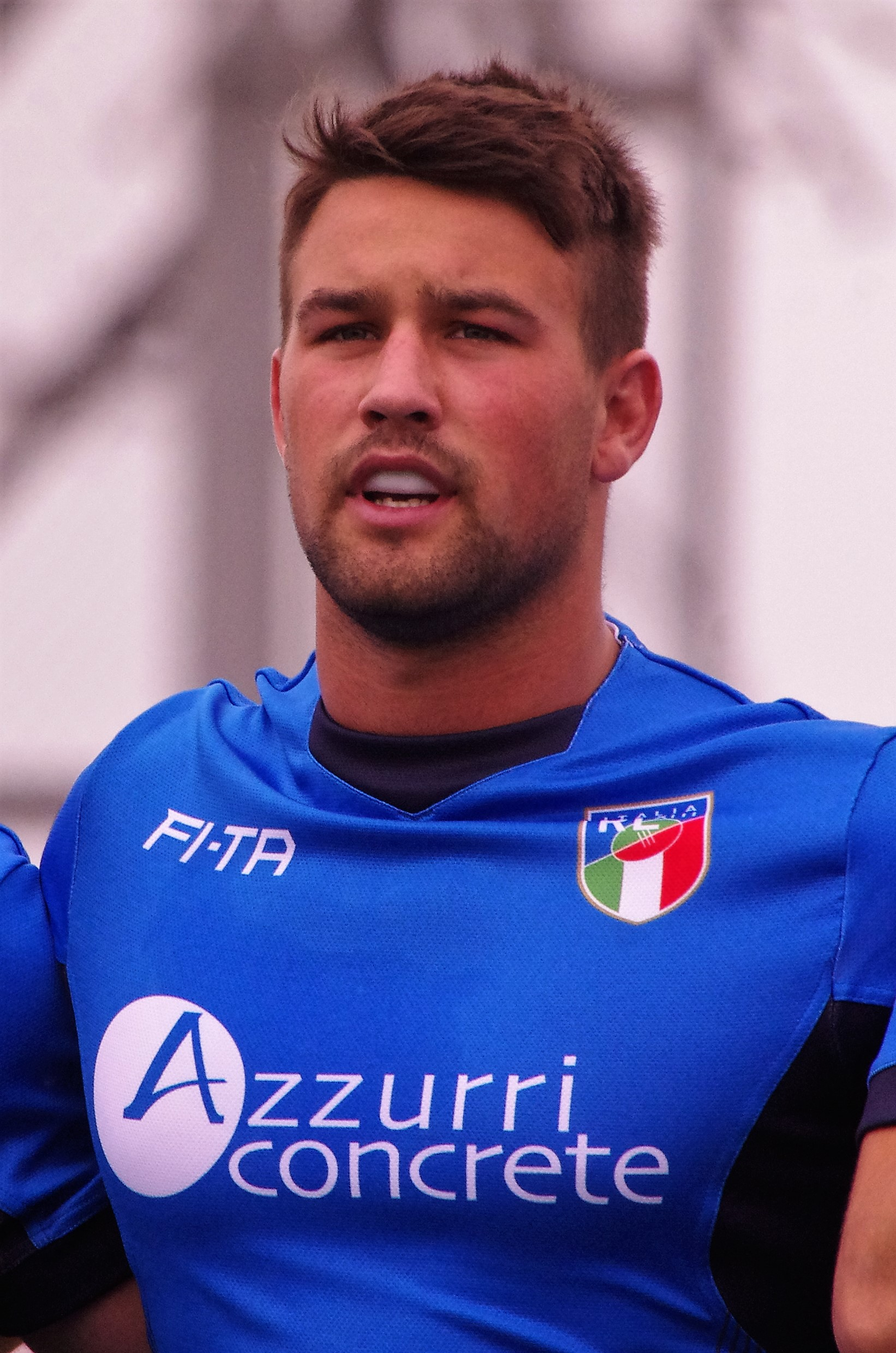

Personal information
- Born: 13 August 1996 (age 30) Sydney, Australia
- Height: 188 cm (6 ft 2 in)
- Weight: 101 kg (15 st 13 lb)

Playing information
- Position: Second-row, Lock
Club
| Years | Team | Pld | T | G | FG | P |
|---|---|---|---|---|---|---|
| 2018– | De La Salle Caringbah | 360 | 24 | 0 | 0 | 96 |
Representative
| Years | Team | Pld | T | G | FG | P |
| 2016–17 | Italy | 7 | 2 | 0 | 0 | 8 |
- Source: As of 18 May 2018
- Father: Shane Walker

Jayden Walker (born 13 August 1996) is an Italian international rugby league footballer who is contracted to the Penrith Panthers in the National Rugby League. He primarily plays as a second-row.

== Early life ==
The son of former professional rugby league footballer Shane Walker, Walker played his junior rugby league for De La Salle Caringbah. He is of Italian descent.

== Playing career ==
Walker was signed by the Cronulla-Sutherland Sharks to play for their S. G. Ball Cup side, before moving into their National Youth Competition side in 2014. On Australia Day in 2015, he was arrested for verbally abusing police and resisting arrest, having been initially approached by authorities for possessing alcohol in an alcohol-free zone. In May 2016, he admitted to using recreational drugs and was banned from playing by the Sharks for 12 weeks. Walker played 14 NYC games for the Sharks between 2014 and 2016.

Walker was selected to represent Italy at the 2017 World Cup qualifying tournament in late 2016. He played in all 3 of Italy's matches, scoring a try against Russia. In 2017, Walker played for the Sharks' feeder team, the Newtown Jets, in the New South Wales Cup. Walker scored a try for Italy in their 24–24 draw against Malta on 8 October, and was a member of Italy's squad for the 2017 World Cup.

In November 2017, Walker signed a one-year contract with the Penrith Panthers for 2018.

== International caps ==
| Cap | Date | Venue | Opponent | Competition | T | G | FG | Points |
|---|---|---|---|---|---|---|---|---|
| 1 | 22 October 2016 | Makiš Stadium, Belgrade | Serbia | 2017 World Cup qualifying | 0 | 0 | 0 | 0 |
| 2 | 29 October 2016 | Stadio Brianteo, Monza | Wales | 2017 World Cup qualifying | 0 | 0 | 0 | 0 |
| 3 | 4 November 2016 | Leigh Sports Village, Leigh | Russia | 2017 World Cup qualifying | 1 | 0 | 0 | 4 |
| 4 | 8 October 2017 | Marconi Stadium, Sydney | Malta | | 1 | 0 | 0 | 4 |
| 5 | 29 October 2017 | Barlow Park, Cairns | Ireland | 2017 World Cup | 0 | 0 | 0 | 0 |
| 6 | 5 November 2017 | Willows Sports Complex, Townsville | United States | 2017 World Cup | 0 | 0 | 0 | 0 |
| 7 | 10 November 2017 | Canberra Stadium, Canberra | Fiji | 2017 World Cup | 0 | 0 | 0 | 0 |
