= Alf Duncan =

Australian rugby league footballer

Personal information
- Full name: Alf Duncan
- Born: 7 September 1977 (age 47)

Playing information
- Position: Wing, Centre
Club
Years	Team	Pld	T	G	FG	P
1998–99	Manly Sea Eagles	20	14	5	0	66
Representative
Years	Team	Pld	T	G	FG	P
1999	Australian Aborigines	2	3	0	0	12
2000	United States	3	5	14	0	48
- Source: As of 25 January 2023

Alf Duncan (born 7 September 1977) is an Australian former professional rugby league footballer who played in the 1990s. He played for the Manly Warringah Sea Eagles in the National Rugby League competition.

== Playing career ==
Duncan made his first grade debut for Manly in round 10 of the 1998 NRL season against the Sydney City Roosters scoring a try during the clubs 44-24 loss. In round 21, Duncan scored a hat-trick in Manly's 20-18 victory over Balmain. Duncan would later play in Manly's 1998 elimination final loss to Canberra. He would finish the year as the clubs second highest try scorer behind Steve Menzies. In the 1999 NRL season, Duncan was limited to only four appearances. At the end of the year, Manly merged with arch-rivals North Sydney to form the Northern Eagles. Duncan was not offered a contract to play for the new side.

After being released by Manly, Duncan joined the Wests Tigers, but a serious knee injury saw him sidelined for most of the 2000 NRL season. He would then join Cronulla-Sutherland Sharks, but was released during 2001 due to a lack of opportunities, linking up with Newtown in the NSW Cup.

Duncan later joined the Melbourne Storm during preseason training and trial matches before the 2002 NRL season. He would feature in a trial match, but did not make the Storm's final squad, instead returning to Newtown.

== International career ==
Duncan played two games for the Australian Aborigines side in 1999 against Papua New Guinea. In 2000, Duncan played three games for the United States at the 2000 Emerging Nations World Cup, including scoring 20 points from two tries and six goals against Morocco.
