= Michael Russo (rugby league) =

Italy international rugby league footballer

Personal information
- Full name: Michael Russo
- Born: 17 October 1983 (age 43) Auburn, New South Wales, Australia

Playing information
- Height: 185 cm (6 ft 1 in)
- Weight: 96 kg (15 st 2 lb)
- Position: Five-eighth, Second-row
Club
Years	Team	Pld	T	G	FG	P
2002	Melbourne Storm	9	2	0	0	8
Representative
Years	Team	Pld	T	G	FG	P
2004	Italy	1	0	0	0	0

Michael Russo (born 17 October 1983), is an Australian former professional rugby league footballer who played in the 2000s for Melbourne Storm.

== Early life ==
Russo was educated at St Joseph's College, Nudgee, where he represented 2001 Australian Schoolboys. He played junior rugby league for the Maroochydore Swans and Nambour Crushers. Moving to Sydney, he played junior representative football for Sydney Roosters, but was homesick and returned to Brisbane to join the Norths Devils, where he was named Devils Colts Player of the Year.

== Playing career ==
He made his NRL debut in round 2 of the 2002 NRL season for the Melbourne Storm against the Sharks. He was awarded 2002 Melbourne Storm Rookie of the Year.

In April 2002, Russo and Melbourne teammate Marty Turner were involved in a serious car accident near Geelong, returning from a surfing trip. Turner suffered fractured ribs, a ruptured spleen, severe concussion, and cuts and bruises. Russo escaped with an injured elbow and was able to return to play in round 6 where he scored a late try to seal a 12–4 win over St George Illawarra Dragons. Russo was selected and played for the Queensland Emerging Origin team in October 2002, but suffered a serious anterior cruciate ligament injury in the match.

Released by Melbourne at the end of the 2003 season, Russo joined Cronulla-Sutherland Sharks in 2004, without adding to his nine NRL games.

Constant injuries cruelled Russo's rugby league career, retiring after the 2004 season. He did play one last game, representing Italy in an Ionio Cup match against Greece in October 2004. Russo was sent off for a high tackle in what was his final game of rugby league.
