= Matthew Lodge =

Australian rugby league footballer

Matt Lodge
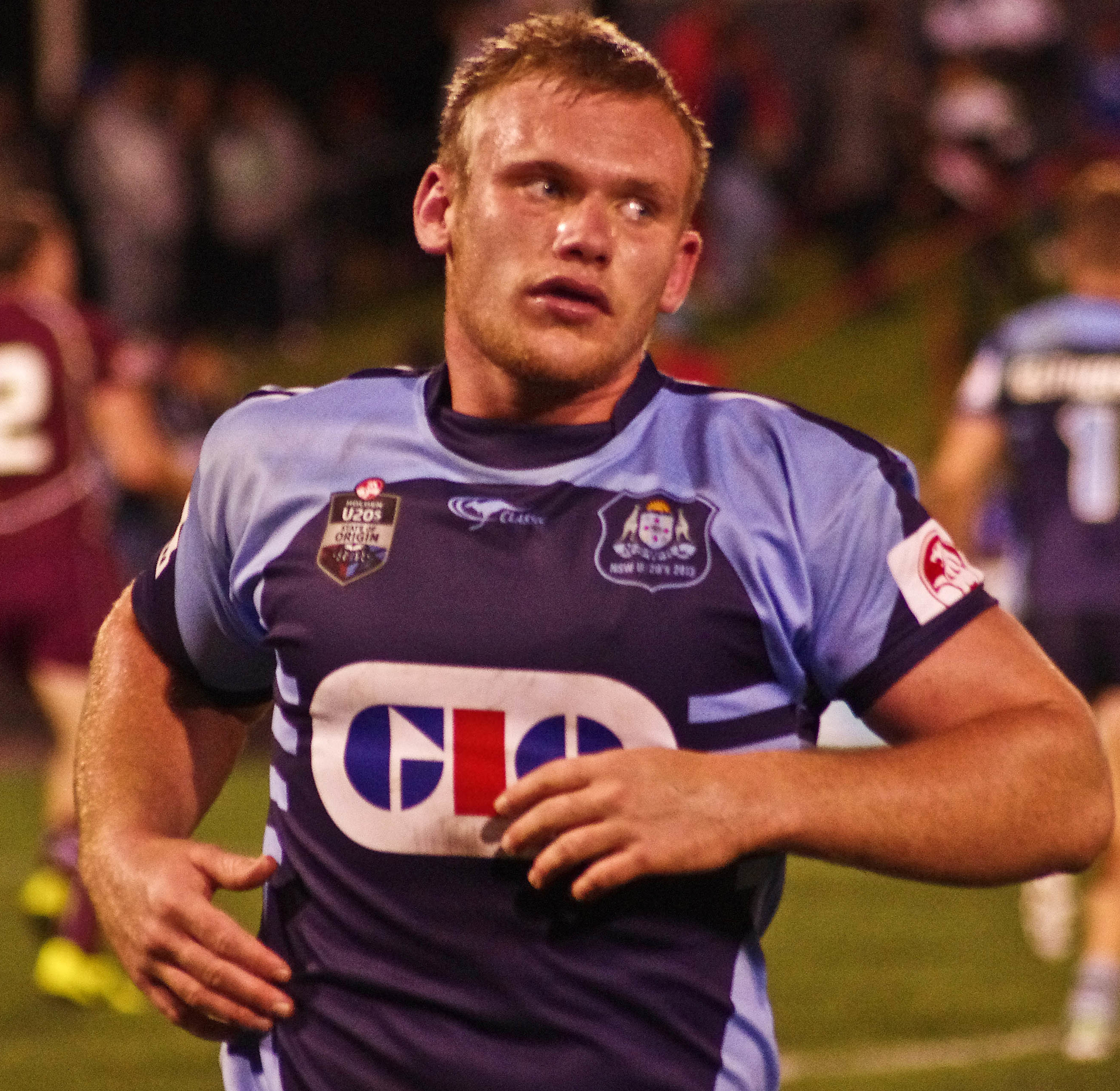

Personal information
- Full name: Matthew Lodge
- Born: 31 May 1995 (age 31) Sydney, New South Wales, Australia
- Height: 6 ft 4 in (1.93 m)
- Weight: 18 st 6 lb (117 kg)

Playing information
- Position: Prop
Club
Years	Team	Pld	T	G	FG	P
2014–15	Wests Tigers	12	0	0	0	0
2018–21	Brisbane Broncos	65	4	0	0	16
2021–22	New Zealand Warriors	14	0	0	0	0
2022–23	Sydney Roosters	18	2	0	0	8
2023–25	Manly Sea Eagles	24	2	0	0	8
2026	Nth Qld Cowboys	15	0	0	0	0
2026–	Leeds Rhinos	4	1	0	0	4
	Total	152	9	0	0	36
- Source: As of 20 November 2026
- Relatives: Sean O'Sullivan (brother-in-law)

Matthew Lodge (born 31 May 1995) is an Australian professional rugby league footballer who plays as a prop for the Leeds Rhinos in the Super League.

He previously played for the Wests Tigers, Brisbane Broncos, New Zealand Warriors, Sydney Roosters, Manly Warringah Sea Eagles and the North Queensland Cowboys in the NRL.

== Background ==
Lodge was born in Sydney, New South Wales, Australia.

He played his junior rugby league for St. Patricks Blacktown before being signed by the Penrith Panthers.

== Playing career ==
=== Early career ===
He played for Penrith's NYC team in 2012.

In September 2012, Lodge signed a contract with the Melbourne Storm starting in 2013. He played for the Storm's NYC team in 2013 and 2014. He was named at prop in the 2013 NYC Team of the Year.

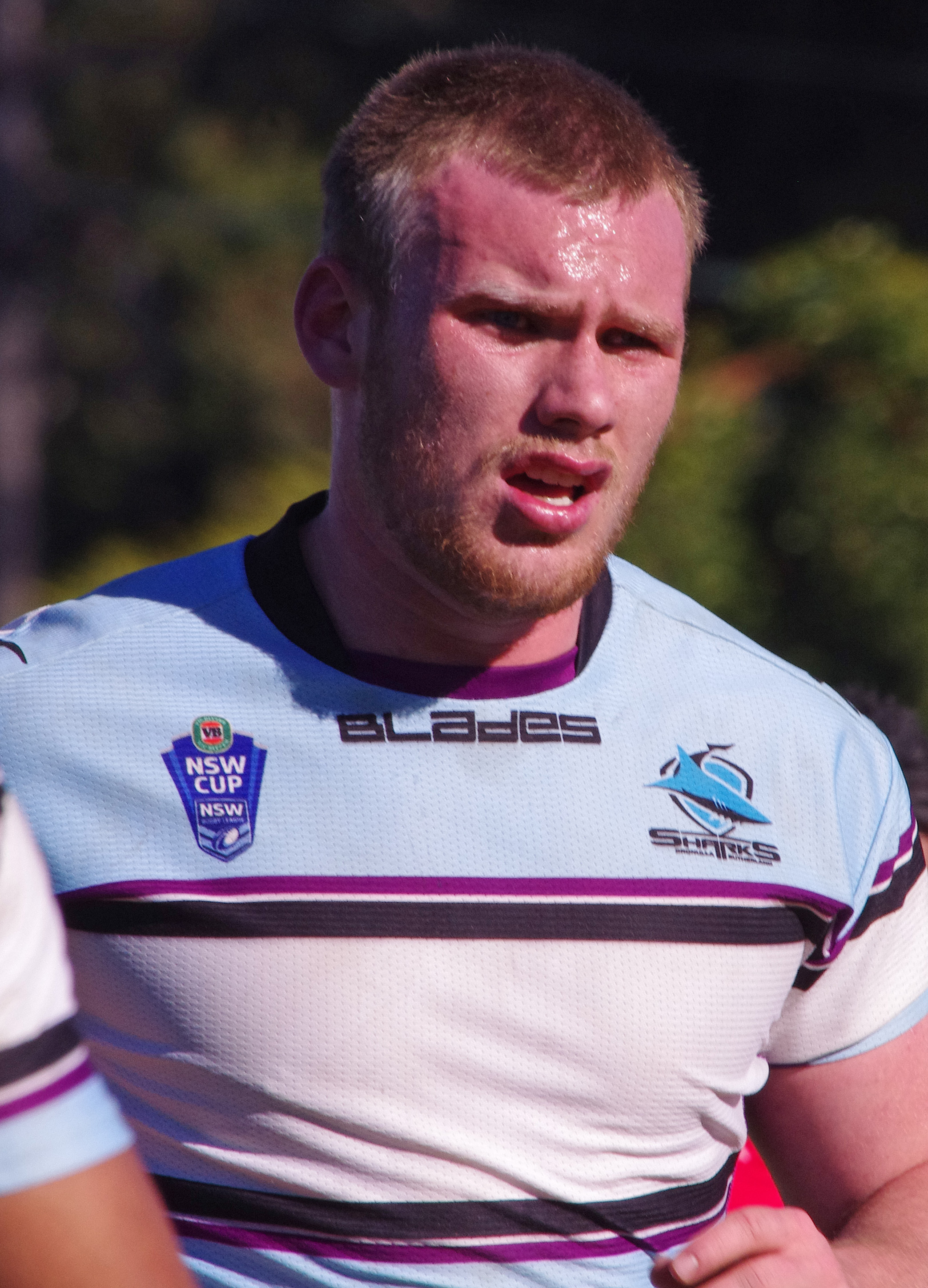
Lodge playing for the Storm-Sharks in 2013

=== Wests Tigers ===
In June 2014, Lodge joined the Wests Tigers mid-season for the remainder of the season, joining their NYC squad. In Round 17 of the 2014 NRL season, Lodge made his NRL debut for the Tigers against his former team, the Penrith Panthers. He made four first grade appearances for the year. He was described as a "110kg battering ram," who was "certain to feature in the regular squad next season." Later in the year, he was chosen to participate in the NSW under-20s pathway camp.

On 19 October 2015, Lodge was sacked by the Tigers after being arrested in New York City. He was due back in court for sentencing in December after entering a guilty plea.

=== Brisbane Broncos ===
After spending some time with the Redcliffe Dolphins in the Queensland Cup, Lodge signed a 1-year contract with the Brisbane Broncos starting in 2018.

Lodge made 22 appearances for Brisbane in the 2019 NRL season as the club finished 8th on the table and qualified for the finals. Lodge played in the club's elimination final against Parramatta which Brisbane lost 58-0 at the new Western Sydney Stadium. The defeat was the worst in Brisbane's history and also the biggest finals defeat in history.

On 19 February 2020, Lodge suffered an ACL injury during pre-season training for Brisbane and was ruled out for an extended period.

Lodge only featured in six games for Brisbane in the 2020 NRL season as the club finished last on the table.

=== New Zealand Warriors ===
Lodge agreed a midseason switch from Brisbane to the Warriors during the 2021 NRL season. In the final round of the 2021 NRL season, Lodge was sent to the sin bin for a dangerous high tackle in the club's 44-0 loss against the Gold Coast. In May 2022, Lodge was released from his New Zealand contract with immediate effect. Lodge was then paid out the remaining $700,000 of his contract in full by the club.

=== Sydney Roosters ===
Following his abrupt departure from the New Zealand Warriors, Lodge was signed to a short-term contract by the Sydney Roosters, joining the club in July 2022. Following the clubs opening round loss of the 2023 NRL season, it was revealed that Lodge would be ruled out for an extended period after suffering a facial fracture. On 19 June, it was reported that Lodge had been granted an immediate release from his Sydney Roosters contract.

=== Manly Warringah Sea Eagles ===
It was announced on 10 July 2023 that Lodge joined the Manly Warringah Sea Eagles on a train and trial deal. In round 21 of the 2023 NRL season, Lodge made his club debut for Manly in their 30-26 victory over rivals Cronulla in the battle of the beaches game. On 5 August 2023, it was announced Lodge would miss approximately nine months with an ACL injury. Lodge was limited to only nine games for Manly in the 2024 NRL season as they finished 7th on the table and qualified for the finals. Manly would be eliminated in the second week of the finals by the Sydney Roosters.

On 17 January 2025, Lodge had signed a train and trial contract with the St. George Illawarra Dragons for the 2025 season. Over the following hours, St. George coach Shane Flanagan had denied reports that Lodge had joined the team.

On 7 February 2025, Manly and Lodge agreed to terms for him to return to the squad as part of the extended team and will play for the Manly NSW Cup team. Lodge also said he will continue working on a building site while he prepares for his second professional fight in the mean time.

Lodge played 12 games for Manly in the 2025 NRL season as the club finished 10th on the table.

=== North Queensland Cowboys ===
On 2 December 2025, Lodge signed a one-year contract with the North Queensland Cowboys. On 13 August 2026, the North Queensland outfit announced that Lodge had been released from his contract and would take up an opportunity with English side Leeds for the remainder of 2026.

=== Leeds Rhinos ===
He made his Leeds Rhinos début in the 16-66 win over York Knights on 23 August 2026, coming off the bench after 37'

== Representative career ==
Lodge has played for the Australian Schoolboys.

In 2011, Lodge played for both the New South Wales Under 16s and Under 18s teams.

In 2013 and 2014, Lodge played for the New South Wales Under 20s team. Lodge was representing the NSW under-20s side when he was given a 3-week suspension after he was televised with the word "CUNT" clearly written on his wrist strapping.

On 2 May 2015, Lodge played for the Junior Kangaroos against Junior Kiwis.

== Statistics ==
*stats correct as of the end of round 10 2026

Year	Team	Games	Tries	Pts
2014	Wests Tigers	4		
2015	Wests Tigers	8		
2018	Brisbane Broncos	25	3	12
2019	Brisbane Broncos	22	1	4
2020	Brisbane Broncos	6		
2021	Brisbane Broncos	12		
2021	New Zealand Warriors	6		
2022	New Zealand Warriors	8		
2022	Sydney Roosters	9	2	8
2023	Sydney Roosters	9		
2023	Manly Warringah Sea Eagles	3		
2024	Manly Warringah Sea Eagles	9		
2025	Manly Warringah Sea Eagles	12	2	8
2026	North Queensland Cowboys	9		
2026	Leeds Rhinos	1		
	Totals	149	8	32

As of 23 August 2026

== Assault charge and lawsuit in New York and NRL controversy ==
On 16 October 2015, Lodge was arrested and charged with assault after he threatened two German tourists, chased them into a New York apartment building, and attacked a man who attempted to help. He proceeded to break into and smash furniture in the man's apartment, including punching a wall through the bathroom door where a nine-year-old boy was hiding, before being stopped by police. He was initially charged with felony burglary causing injury, but it was reduced to a misdemeanor charge of reckless assault as part of a plea deal. The victims then filed a civil lawsuit against Lodge for US$2 million in July 2016. In December 2016, Lodge avoided jail time, and was ordered to complete 200 hours of community service, quit drinking, and receive alcohol abuse and anger treatment. Lodge signed a 1-year contract worth an estimated AU$85,000 with Brisbane Broncos for the 2018 National Rugby League season. The NRL were scrutinised for supporting Lodge and allowing the deal to happen while the victims have not been legally compensated.
