= Junior Langi =

Australian rugby league footballer

Personal information
- Full name: Junior Langi
- Born: 2 August 1981 (age 44) Auckland, New Zealand

Playing information
- Height: 181 cm (5 ft 11 in)
- Weight: 100 kg (15 st 10 lb)
- Position: Centre
Club
Years	Team	Pld	T	G	FG	P
2000	St. George Illawarra	3	0	0	0	0
2001–03	Melbourne Storm	34	6	0	0	24
2004	Parramatta Eels	16	2	0	0	8
2005–06	Salford	37	7	0	0	28
	Total	90	15	0	0	60

Junior Langi (born 2 August 1981) is a former professional rugby league footballer who played in the 2000s for the St. George Illawarra, Melbourne Storm, Parramatta Eels and Salford Red Devils.

== Early life ==
Born in Auckland, New Zealand with Niuean and Tongan heritage. Langi moved to Australia, educated at Trinity Catholic College, Auburn, where he represented 1999 Australian Schoolboys.

== Playing career ==
Langi made his first grade debut for St. George against Canterbury in round 3 in the 2000 NRL season. Langi then joined Melbourne and played with the club between 2001 and 2003 before joining Parramatta in 2004. Langi became a regular starter for Parramatta and made 16 appearances for the club. Langi signed for Salford in 2005. He retired from the sport in December 2006 due to an eye condition and returned home.
