= Kirk Reynoldson =

Australian rugby league footballer

Personal information
- Full name: Kirk Reynoldson
- Born: 11 March 1979 (age 47) Brisbane, Queensland, Australia

Playing information
- Height: 188 cm (6 ft 2 in)
- Weight: 103 kg (16 st 3 lb)
- Position: Lock, Second-row, Prop
Club
Years	Team	Pld	T	G	FG	P
2002–04	Melbourne Storm	63	6	0	0	24
2005–07	Newcastle Knights	41	4	0	0	16
2008	St. George Illawarra	21	1	0	0	4
	Total	125	11	0	0	44

Kirk Reynoldson (born 11 March 1979) is an Australian former professional rugby league footballer who last played for the St. George Illawarra Dragons in the National Rugby League. He previously played for the Newcastle Knights and the Melbourne Storm. Reynoldson primarily played in the second row.

== Background ==
Reynoldson was born in Brisbane, Queensland, Australia.

== Playing career ==
Reynoldson played in the lower grades for Parramatta before being released where he signed with Melbourne.

Reynoldson made his first grade debut for Melbourne in round 7 of the 2002 NRL season against the New Zealand Warriors. In 2003, Reynoldson played 26 games for the club as they reached the finals but were eliminated in the second week against Canterbury losing 30–0. In 2004, Reynoldson made 20 appearances for Melbourne as they once again made it to week 2 of the finals.

Midway though 2004, Reynoldson agreed to a deal with the Newcastle Knights. Reynoldson played only 7 games for Newcastle in 2005 as the club finished last on the table claiming the wooden spoon. In 2006, Reynoldson became a regular starter for Newcastle as the club qualified for the finals but were eliminated in week 2 against Brisbane losing 50–6. On 13 November 2007, Reynoldson agreed to a one-year deal with the St. George Illawarra Dragons for the 2008 NRL season.

Renowned throughout his career for his trademark long, scraggly, "bushranger"-style beard, Reynoldson retired from professional rugby league following the conclusion of the 2008 NRL season. Reynoldson's last game in first grade was the 2008 38-6 qualifying final loss to Manly-Warringah. In 2012, Reynoldson signed with the Dalby Diehards.

== Career statistics ==
- Junior Club: Toowoomba Wattles
- First Grade Debut: Melbourne v Warriors at Ericsson Stadium, 27 April 2002 (Round 7)
- Career: Played 125 games in total
