= Shane Walker (rugby league, born 1971) =

Australian rugby league footballer

Personal information
- Full name: Shane Walker
- Born: 4 January 1971 (age 54) Rockdale, New South Wales, Australia

Playing information
- Position: Prop
Club
| Years | Team | Pld | T | G | FG | P |
|---|---|---|---|---|---|---|
| 1990–92 | St. George Dragons | 3 | 1 | 0 | 0 | 4 |
| 1993–94 | Eastern Suburbs | 14 | 0 | 3 | 0 | 6 |
| 1995–99 | Balmain | 100 | 2 | 1 | 0 | 10 |
| 2000–01 | Wests Tigers | 43 | 2 | 0 | 0 | 8 |
| 2002 | Melbourne Storm | 18 | 0 | 0 | 0 | 0 |
| | Total | 178 | 5 | 4 | 0 | 28 |
- Source: As of 23 January 2019
- Relatives: Jayden Walker (son)

Shane Walker (born 4 January 1971), is an Australian former rugby league footballer who played in the 1990s and early 2000s. Walker played for the St. George Dragons in 1990 and 1992, the Eastern Suburbs Roosters in 1993 and 1994, the Balmain Tigers between 1995 and 1999, the Wests Tigers in 2000 and 2001 and finally the Melbourne Storm in 2002.

== Playing career ==
Walker made his debut for St George in Round 21 1990 against South Sydney. In 1993, Walker moved to Eastern Suburbs and played there for 2 seasons before signing with Balmain. In 1995, Balmain changed their name to the "Sydney Tigers" at the beginning of the Super League war and relocated out to Parramatta Stadium. Walker made 20 appearances for the club in his first season with them as they finished outside the finals places.

In 1997, the "Sydney Tigers" changed their name back to Balmain and moved their home ground back to Leichhardt Oval. Walker played with the club up until the end of 1999 and played in the side's final ever game in first grade which was a 42–14 loss against Canberra.

At the end of 1999, Balmain merged with fellow foundation club Western Suburbs to form the Wests Tigers. Walker was one of the Balmain players signed with the new team and played in their inaugural game against Brisbane. At the end of 2001, Walker departed Wests and joined Melbourne. Walker played 1 season with Melbourne before retiring at the end of 2002.

His son, Jayden Walker, is an Italian rugby league representative.
