= William Leyshon =

Australian rugby league footballer

Willie Leyshon
Personal information
- Born: 15 July 1976 (age 50) Blacktown, New South Wales, Australia

Playing information
- Position: Second-row, Lock, Hooker
Club
Years	Team	Pld	T	G	FG	P
1995–99	North Sydney Bears	41	5	0	0	20
2000–01	Northern Eagles	11	0	0	0	0
2002	Melbourne Storm	22	6	0	0	24
2003	Parramatta Eels	2	0	0	0	0
	Total	76	11	0	0	44
- Source: As of 24 January 2019

William Leyshon is an Australian former professional rugby league footballer who played in the 1990s and 2000s. He played for North Sydney, Northern Eagles, Melbourne Storm and finally Parramatta.

== Playing career ==
Leyshon made his first grade debut as an 18-year-old for the North Sydney Bears against the Parramatta Eels in round 14 of the 1995 ARL season at North Sydney Oval. His career was impacted by injuries from then on, requiring a shoulder reconstruction a few weeks after his debut, missing the entire 1996 season and breaking a leg during the 1997 season.

In the 1998 NRL season, Leyshon made 24 appearances as Norths finished fifth on the table but were eliminated from the finals series after losing both matches against Parramatta and Canterbury-Bankstown. Injuries would strike again in 1999 – he tore his anterior cruciate ligament and required his first knee reconstruction.

Leyshon played with North Sydney up until their controversial merger with arch rivals Manly-Warringah to form the Northern Eagles. Leyshon was one of the few Norths players offered a contract to play for the new side. While with the Northern Eagles, Leyshon struggled with knee injuries and after further anterior cruciate ligament reconstruction surgeries, was limited to only 11 appearances over three seasons.

In 2002, Leyshon joined Melbourne and played one season with them before announcing his retirement from rugby league just before the start of the 2003 NRL season. Leyshon later blamed Melbourne Storm strength and conditioning coach Alex Corvo and physiotherapist Matt Natusch for ignoring his pleas for an altered training program due to his persistent knee injuries. Leyshon had four knee reconstructions and had been on a modified program during preseason training and had been forced to take a break during December 2002.

Leyshon would attempt a comeback joining Parramatta during the 2003 season, but managed only two appearances for the Eels, retiring again in July 2003 just after his 27th birthday.

Ahead of the 2004 NRL season, Leyshon again came out of retirement, signing an incentive-based contract with the St. George Illawarra Dragons. He would make limited appearances for the club in the NSWRL Premier League competition, after suffering multiple groin injuries. He retired again following the end of the 2004 season.

== Coaching career ==
Following his retirement from playing rugby league, Leyshon was hired as an assistant coach at the North Sydney Bears under Gary Freeman in 2005. He would later take over from Steve Carter as coach of the Bears team in the Jersey Flegg Cup competition in 2007.

On 11 October 2017, Leyshon was announced as the coach for the North Sydney Bears under-20s squad, after a stint as coach of the Penrith Panthers squad in the under-16s Harold Matthews Cup during 2017.
