= Marty Turner =

New Zealand rugby league footballer

Personal information
- Full name: Marty Turner
- Born: 7 May 1981 (age 45) Christchurch, New Zealand
- Height: 176 cm (5 ft 9 in)
- Weight: 85 kg (13 st 5 lb)

Playing information
- Position: Stand-off, Scrum-half
Club
Years	Team	Pld	T	G	FG	P
2002–03	Melbourne Storm	3	0	7	0	14
2005	Oldham RLFC	23	8	84	1	201
2006	Redcliffe Dolphins
	Total	26	8	91	1	215
- Source: As of 1 July 2021

Marty Turner (born 7 May 1981), is a New Zealand former professional rugby league footballer who played in the 2000s. He played for the Melbourne Storm from 2002 to 2003 and Oldham RLFC (Heritage No. 1159) in England.

Making his first grade rugby league debut during the 2002 NRL season for Melbourne, he replaced Matt Orford for two games early in the season. On 9 April 2002, Turner and teammate Michael Russo were involved in a motor vehicle accident, that resulted in Turner being rushed to intensive care, spending days in hospital with a ruptured spleen, fractured ribs, severe concussion and bruising.
