= 2005 Melbourne Storm season =

- NRL Rank: 6th
- Play-off result: Semi-final Loss
- 2005 record: Wins: 13; draws: 0; losses: 11
- Points scored: For: 640; against: 462

Team information
- CEO: Brian Waldron
- Coach: Craig Bellamy
- Captain: Robbie Kearns (25 Games) Matt Orford (1 Game)
- Stadium: Olympic Park
- Avg. attendance: 8,898
- High attendance: 12,149 (Round 4)

Top scorers
- Tries: Billy Slater (20)
- Goals: Matt Orford (63)
- Points: Matt Orford (172)
← 2004	List of seasons	2006 →

The 2005 Melbourne Storm season was the 8th in the club's history. They competed in the NRL's 2005 Telstra Premiership, finishing the regular season 6th out of 15 teams and making the finals. The season began with two big wins over the Knights and Dragons, each by more than 30 points. The form line followed a similar path to the previous season though as the team struggled to string consecutive wins together and hovered around the lower part of the eight for much of the season before ultimately finishing sixth once again. Future star Greg Inglis made his debut in Round 6. Storm finished the season with the second best defence in the competition and again went to Suncorp Stadium in Week One of the finals, producing the same result to defeat the Broncos.

However for the third straight season the side was unable to progress past the semi-final stage, losing to the Cowboys. At the end of the season, Storm legends Robbie Kearns and Matt Geyer were inducted as inaugural life members of the Club.

== Season summary ==
- 22 February – The Supreme Court of New South Wales finds Melbourne and former players Stephen Kearney and Marcus Bai responsible for the spear tackle that ended the career of Jarrod McCracken in the 2000 NRL season.
- Round 1 – Melbourne open their 2005 season at home with a resounding 48–10 win over Newcastle Knights. Leading 22–0 at half time, the Storm extend their lead on the back of a Billy Slater hat-trick. Former Melbourne winger Dustin Cooper scores a double for the visitors. Brett White makes his NRL debut.
- Round 4 – Storm thrash Brisbane Broncos 50–4 to inflict the heaviest defeat in the Broncos' 18-year history. The 50 point score against Brisbane also bested the 48 points scored by Melbourne in 1999. Before the game, the club honours 1999 premiership players Glenn Lazarus and Tawera Nikau; by renaming the eastern (Nikau) and western (Lazarus) grandstands.
- Round 5 – In their only Friday night game for the year, and also their only free-to-air match for the regular season, the Storm are defeated 36–16 by the Penrith Panthers at Penrith Stadium.
- 13 April – Melbourne is found to have breached the competition's salary cap in 2004 and are fined $120,000.
- Round 6 – Greg Inglis makes his NRL debut at just 18 years and 91 days, scoring a try in a 26–14 loss to a Parramatta Eels side that had been thrashed by the Brisbane Broncos 54–14 at Suncorp Stadium in Brisbane just six days earlier.
- 30 April – The Victoria State Government confirms that the Olympic Park precinct will undergo a $100m redevelopment, with a new stadium scheduled for completion in 2008. On the same day, the Storm suffer their second straight loss at home, going down to the Cronulla-Sutherland Sharks by 30–10.
- 2 May – Controversy over "grapple tackles" erupts with Cronulla prop claiming he was choked in a two-man Storm tackle.
- Round 12 – Melbourne breaks a three-game losing streak at home by beating St George Illawarra by 24–16. The Dragons' loss capped off a horror weekend for the two red-and-white teams in Melbourne; the other team, the Sydney Swans, were thrashed by St Kilda at Telstra Dome the previous evening.
- Round 13 – Melbourne win their first game at Leichhardt Oval since 1998, coming from 8–0 down at half time to win 30–14.
- Round 14 – Missing Origin players, Melbourne are awarded a controversial penalty try to Cooper Cronk early in the second half. It wasn't enough for the victory, as the New Zealand Warriors regained the Michael Moore Trophy win a 24–16 victory.
- Round 15 – Melbourne are defeated by the Penrith Panthers for the second time in the season, going down by 28–14.
- Round 16 – Melbourne return to form thrashing South Sydney Rabbitohs 48–6, with Billy Slater scoring another hat-trick.
- Round 17 – In their 200th premiership match, Melbourne win just their second game in 13 attempts against 2004 premiers Canterbury-Bankstown Bulldogs, with Slater and Inglis both scoring two tries in a 33–6 win. It was also the Storm's first win at Engie Stadium.
- Round 18 – In front of the lowest attended Olympic Park home game in club history (6,063), Melbourne hold Canberra Raiders scoreless for the first time.
- 20 July – After weeks of speculation, it's announced halfback Matt Orford has signed a four-year contract with Manly worth nearly $2m.
- Round 23 – Melbourne celebrate the 100th game at Olympic Park by regaining the Michael Moore Trophy, winning 22–10 over the Warriors. In a function before the match, former coach Chris Anderson returned to the club for the first time since his departure during the 2001 season, ending his bitter feud with management involved during the formation of the club.
- Round 25 – In his last home game for the club, Robbie Kearns is chaired from the field following a 34–22 win over Wests Tigers. Coach Craig Bellamy saying that Kearns "without a doubt is the heart and soul of this club."
- Round 26 – A penalty try awarded against Billy Slater in a 30–24 loss to the North Queensland Cowboys was part of a controversial night in Townsville with Cowboys forward Carl Webb suspended for punching Ryan Hoffman allegedly in retaliation for a "grapple tackle." The loss drops Melbourne to sixth on the ladder at the end of the regular season, behind the Cowboys in fourth.
- Qualifying Final – Travelling to Brisbane for the second year in a row, Melbourne hang on for a 24–18 win over the Broncos. Injuries to Robbie Kearns (shoulder) and Billy Slater (ankle) complicating things for the club for the remainder of the finals.
- 12 September – Melbourne and North Queensland spark a war of words over the "grapple tackle", with both clubs accusing the other of using the technique ahead of the semi-final between the teams. Melbourne later release video of 20 incidents in which they claim Cowboys players were putting opponents in headlocks.
- Semi-final – For the third year in a row, Melbourne are eliminated in the second week of the NRL finals, this time going down 24–16 to the Cowboys at Aussie Stadium. Down 16–0 at half time, Melbourne were gifted a try by referee Paul Simpkins who failed to consult the video referee when centre Steven Bell lost control of the ball while attempting to score. A frantic final flurry almost saw Melbourne level the scores led by fill-in captain Matt Orford.

=== Milestone games ===
Round	Player	Milestone
Round 1	Dennis Scott	Storm debut
Round 1	Brett White	NRL debut
Round 1	Cameron Smith	50th game
Round 2	Billy Slater	50th game
Round 3	Ian Donnelly	Storm debut
Round 4	Jamie McDonald	Storm debut
Round 4	Matt Geyer	500 points
Round 5	Alex Chan	50th game
Round 6	Greg Inglis	NRL debut
Round 7	Jamie Feeney	Storm debut
Round 11	Josh Graham	NRL debut
Round 12	Dallas Johnson	50th game
Round 14	Tevita Metuisela	Storm debut
Round 18	Glen Turner	50th game
Round 20	Steven Bell	100th game
Round 21	Ryan Hoffman	50th game

=== Jerseys ===
For the 2005 season, Melbourne signed a new apparel contract with Reebok. The home jersey remained largely unchanged from the 2003–04 design, but now with a simple navy blue T-shirt style collar. This meant the home jersey did not feature gold for the first time in team history.

A new white clash jersey was designed, featuring a large gold thunderbolt with purple block shadowing, which was partially obscured by the jersey advertiser Adecco. The clash jersey was worn with different navy blue shorts featuring the thunderbolt design on the right.

The clash jersey was worn on seven occasions during the regular season (rounds 5, 13, 14, 19, 21, 22, 26); with Melbourne only winning on one occasion against Wests Tigers. Both finals games were also played with Melbourne wearing the clash jersey.

== Fixtures ==
=== Pre Season ===
Date	Rd	Opponent	Venue	Result	Mel.	Opp.	Tries	Goals	Field goals	Ref
5 February	Trial	Central Comets	Browne Park, Rockhampton	Won	58	18	J Webster (2), M Brentnall (2), J Tatupu, R Shortland, T Metuisela, A Kaufusi, P Robinson	G Inglis (7)		
19 February	Trial	Brisbane Broncos	Carrara Stadium, Gold Coast	Won	24	10	S Turner, S Bell, J Smith, B Slater, G Inglis	S Turner (2)		
25 February	Trial	North Queensland Cowboys	Barlow Park, Cairns	Won	30	18	C Smith, R Kearns, B Slater, R Hoffman, J Webster	M Orford (3), C Smith, G Inglis		

=== Regular season ===
==== Result by round ====
Round	1	2	3	4	5	6	7	8	9	10	11	12	13	14	15	16	17	18	19	20	21	22	23	24	25	26
Ground	H	A	A	H	A	H	A	H	–	A	H	H	A	A	H	H	A	H	A	H	A	A	H	–	H	A
Result	W	W	L	W	L	L	W	L	B	W	L	W	W	L	L	W	W	W	L	W	L	L	W	B	W	L
Position	1	1	3	3	5	7	6	6	6	5	7	6	6	6	7	6	6	3	4	3	6	8	5	5	5	6
Points	2	4	4	6	6	6	8	8	10	12	12	14	16	16	16	18	20	22	22	24	24	24	26	28	30	30

Source: Rugby League Tables
A = Away; H = Home; N = Neutral; B = Bye; W = Win; D = Draw; L = Loss

==== Matches ====
- (g.p.) – Golden Point extra time
- (pen) – Penalty try

Date	Rd	Opponent	Venue	Result	Mel.	Opp.	Tries	Goals	Field goals	Ref
13 March	1	Newcastle Knights	Olympic Park, Melbourne	Won	48	10	B Slater (3), M Orford (2), C Cronk, R Hoffman, J Webster, B White	M Orford 4/5, M Geyer 2/2, C Smith 0/2		
19 March	2	St George Illawarra Dragons	WIN Stadium, Wollongong	Won	46	12	S Bell (2), M Orford (2), R Kearns, M King, B Slater, C Smith	M Orford 4/5, C Smith 3/4		
27 March	3	Manly Warringah Sea Eagles	Brookvale Oval, Sydney	Lost	18	25	S Bell, C Cronk, B Slater	C Smith 3/3		
2 April	4	Brisbane Broncos	Olympic Park, Melbourne	Won	50	4	M Geyer (2), M King (2), B Slater (2), J Webster (2), S Bell, R Hoffman	M Orford 4/7, C Smith 1/3		
8 April	5	Penrith Panthers	CUA Stadium, Sydney	Lost	16	36	S Bell, A Chan, M King	M Orford 1/3, C Smith 1/1		
16 April	6	Parramatta Eels	Olympic Park, Melbourne	Lost	14	26	G Inglis, M King, M Orford	C Smith 1/2, M Orford 0/1		
24 April	7	Canberra Raiders	Canberra Stadium, Canberra	Won	46	10	M King (2), B Slater (2), M Geyer, S Hill, R Hoffman, J Webster	M Orford 4/5, C Smith 3/4		
30 April	8	Cronulla-Sutherland Sharks	Olympic Park, Melbourne	Lost	10	30	P Robinson, D Scott	M Orford 1/2		
6 May	9	Bye								
14 May	10	South Sydney Rabbitohs	Aussie Stadium, Sydney	Won	38	12	G Turner (2), S Bell, A Chan, M Geyer, G Inglis, D Kidwell, M Orford	C Smith 3/8		
21 May	11	Canterbury-Bankstown Bulldogs	Olympic Park, Melbourne	Lost	16	26	J Graham, R Kearns, D Kidwell	M Orford 2/3		
29 May	12	St George Illawarra Dragons	Olympic Park, Melbourne	Won	24	16	M King, M Orford, C Smith, G Turner	M Orford 3/4, C Smith 1/1		
5 June	13	Wests Tigers	Leichhardt Oval, Sydney	Won	30	14	B Slater (2), S Bell, M Geyer, J Webster	M Orford 3/3, C Smith 2/2		
12 June	14	New Zealand Warriors	Ericsson Stadium, Auckland	Lost	16	24	M Geyer (2), C Cronk	M Orford 2/4		
18 June	15	Penrith Panthers	Olympic Park, Melbourne	Lost	14	28	S Bell, M Geyer, M King	M Orford 1/3		
25 June	16	South Sydney Rabbitohs	Olympic Park, Melbourne	Won	48	6	B Slater (3), M Geyer (2), S Bell, D Kidwell, G Turner, J Webster	M Orford 4/7, C Smith 2/2		
2 July	17	Canterbury-Bankstown Bulldogs	Sydney Showground, Sydney	Won	33	6	G Inglis (2), B Slater (2), G Turner	M Orford 6/7	M Orford	
9 July	18	Canberra Raiders	Olympic Park, Melbourne	Won	20	0	J Webster (2), S Bell	M Orford 2/3, C Smith 2/2		
17 July	19	Brisbane Broncos	Suncorp Stadium, Brisbane	Lost	15	28	D Johnson, M Orford	M Orford 3/4	M Orford	
24 July	20	Sydney Roosters	Olympic Park, Melbourne	Won	24	10	D Johnson, D Kidwell, M King, B Slater	M Orford 3/4, C Smith 1/1		
30 July	21	Newcastle Knights	EnergyAustralia Stadium, Newcastle	Lost	18	37	C Cronk, D Scott, B Slater	M Orford 2/2, C Smith 1/1		
6 August	22	Cronulla-Sutherland Sharks	Toyota Park, Sydney	Lost	16	40	S Bell, A Kaufusi, J Webster	M Orford 1/1, C Smith 1/2		
13 August	23	New Zealand Warriors	Olympic Park, Melbourne	Won	22	10	M King (2), M Orford, B Slater	M Orford 3/4		
20 August	24	Bye								
27 August	25	Wests Tigers	Olympic Park, Melbourne	Won	34	22	S Bell, M Geyer, G Inglis, A Kaufusi, M Orford, C Smith	M Orford 5/5, C Smith 0/1		
3 September	26	North Queensland Cowboys	Dairy Farmers Stadium, Townsville	Lost	24	30	S Bell, R Hoffman, G Inglis, D Scott	M Orford 2/2, C Smith 4/5		

=== Finals ===
Qualifying final
10 September 2005

Brisbane Broncos	18 - 24	Melbourne Storm
Tries: Scott Minto; Brett Seymour; Darren Smith; Goals: Brett Seymour 3/4		Tries: Greg Inglis; Matt King; Billy Slater; Jake Webster; Goals: Matt Orford 2/2; Cameron Smith 2/2

Suncorp Stadium
Attendance: 25,193
Referee: Steve Clark

Semi final
17 September 2005

Melbourne Storm	16 - 24	North Queensland Cowboys
Tries: Steven Bell; Matt King; Matt Orford; Goals: Matt Orford 1/2; Cameron Smith 1/1		Tries: Ty Williams (2); Matt Bowen; David Faiumu; Goals; Josh Hannay 2/3; Johnathan Thurston 2/2

Aussie Stadium
Attendance: 16,801
Referee: Paul Simpkins

== Ladder ==
2005 NRL season
Pos	Team	Pld	W	D	L	B	PF	PA	PD	Pts
1	Parramatta Eels	24	16	0	8	2	704	456	+248	36
2	St George Illawarra Dragons	24	16	0	8	2	655	510	+145	36
3	Brisbane Broncos	24	15	0	9	2	597	484	+113	34
4	Wests Tigers (P)	24	14	0	10	2	676	575	+101	32
5	North Queensland Cowboys	24	14	0	10	2	639	563	+76	32
6	Melbourne Storm	24	13	0	11	2	640	462	+178	30
7	Cronulla-Sutherland Sharks	24	12	0	12	2	550	564	-14	28
8	Manly-Warringah Sea Eagles	24	12	0	12	2	554	632	-78	28
9	Sydney Roosters	24	11	0	13	2	488	487	+1	26
10	Penrith Panthers	24	11	0	13	2	554	554	0	26
11	New Zealand Warriors	24	10	0	14	2	515	528	-13	24
12	Canterbury-Bankstown Bulldogs	24	9	1	14	2	472	670	-198	23
13	South Sydney Rabbitohs	24	9	1	14	2	482	700	-218	23
14	Canberra Raiders	24	9	0	15	2	465	606	-141	22
15	Newcastle Knights	24	8	0	16	2	467	667	-200	20

== 2005 Coaching Staff ==
- Head coach: Craig Bellamy
- Assistant coaches : Dean Lance, Michael Maguire & Peter Sharp
- Development coach: Marc Brentnall
- Strength and conditioning Coach: Alex Corvo
- Football Manager: Peter O'Sullivan

== 2005 squad ==
List current as of 28 September 2021

Cap (Note: Players are listed with the cap number as they appear on the Melbourne Storm honour board. Additional squad members do not have a cap number.)	Nat.	Player name	Position	First Storm Game	Previous First Grade RL club (Note: This column denotes the previous RL club the player was signed to and played first grade RL for. If they are yet to debut then this is stipulated. If they were merely signed to the club but did not play then it is not counted.)
6	(Australia)	Scott Hill	FE, LK	1998	(Australia) Hunter Mariners
10	(Australia)	Robbie Kearns	PR	1998	(Australia) Perth Reds
18	(Australia)	Matt Geyer	WG	1998	(Australia) Perth Reds
37	(New Zealand)	Glen Turner	SR	2000	(Australia) Melbourne Storm
38	(New Zealand)	Peter Robinson	SR	2000	(Australia) Melbourne Storm
43	(Australia)	Matt Orford	HB	2001	(Australia) Northern Eagles
44	(Australia)	Steven Bell	CE	2001	(Australia) Melbourne Storm
55	(Australia)	Cameron Smith (c)	HK	2002	(Australia) Melbourne Storm
58	(Australia)	Billy Slater	FB	2003	(Australia) Melbourne Storm
59	(New Zealand)	David Kidwell	SR, LK	2003	(Australia) Sydney Roosters
60	(Australia)	Dallas Johnson	SR, LK	2003	(Australia) Melbourne Storm
61	(New Zealand)	Jake Webster	WG	2003	(Australia) Melbourne Storm
62	(Australia)	Ryan Hoffman	SR, LK	2003	(Australia) Melbourne Storm
64	(New Zealand)	Robert Tanielu	PR	2003	(Australia) Brisbane Broncos
67	(Australia)	Nathan Friend	HK	2003	(Australia) Brisbane Broncos
68	(Australia)	Antonio Kaufusi	PR	2003	(Australia) Melbourne Storm
69	(Australia)	Matt King	CE	2003	(Australia) Melbourne Storm
71	(Australia)	Alex Chan	PR	2004	(Australia) Parramatta Eels
72	(Australia)	Steve Turner	FB, WG	2004	(Australia) Penrith Panthers
73	(Australia)	Cooper Cronk	HB	2004	(Australia) Melbourne Storm
74	(New Zealand)	Jeremy Smith	LK	2004	(Australia) Melbourne Storm
75	(Australia)	Dennis Scott	SR	2005	(Australia) Canterbury-Bankstown Bulldogs
76	(Australia)	Brett White	PR	2005	(Australia) Melbourne Storm
77	(Australia)	Ian Donnelly	PR	2005	(Australia) Manly Sea Eagles
78	(Australia)	Jamie McDonald	PR	2005	(Australia) North Queensland Cowboys
79	(Australia)	Greg Inglis	CE, FB	2005	(Australia) Melbourne Storm
80	(Australia)	Jamie Feeney	SR, LK	2005	(Australia) Canterbury-Bankstown Bulldogs
81	(Australia)	Josh Graham	CE	2005	(Australia) Melbourne Storm
82	(Australia)	Tevita Metuisela	PR	2005	(Australia) Sydney Roosters
-	(New Zealand)	Ryan Shortland	FE, CE	Yet to Debut	(Australia) Melbourne Storm
-	(Australia)	Scott Anderson	PR	Yet to Debut	(Australia) Melbourne Storm
-	(Samoa)	Sam Tagataese	SR, PR	Yet to Debut	(Australia) Melbourne Storm
-	(New Zealand)	Jeremiah Pai	FE, HB	Yet to Debut	New Zealand Warriors (Note: Signed from Parramatta Eels, last played NRL for Warriors in 2002.)

== Player movements ==
Losses

- Dustin Cooper to Newcastle Knights
- Rodney Howe to Retirement
- Stephen Kearney to Hull F.C.
- Ben MacDougall to Edinburgh Rugby
- Andrew McFadden to Retirement
- Fifita Moala to Released
- Kirk Reynoldson to Newcastle Knights
- Danny Williams to London Broncos

Gains

- Ian Donnelly from Manly Warringah Sea Eagles
- Jamie Feeney from Canterbury-Bankstown Bulldogs
- Jamie McDonald from North Queensland Cowboys
- Tevita Metuisela from Sydney Roosters
- Dennis Scott from Canterbury-Bankstown Bulldogs

== Representative honours ==
This table lists all players who have played a representative match in 2005.

Player	2005 ANZAC Test	City vs Country Origin	State of Origin 1	State of Origin 2	State of Origin 3	Tri-Nations (Note: Including additional test matches against France)
Scott Hill	–	Country	–	–	–	–
David Kidwell	New Zealand	–	–	–	–	New Zealand
Matt King	–	Country	New South Wales	New South Wales	New South Wales	Australia
Billy Slater	–	–	Queensland	Queensland	–	–
Cameron Smith	–	–	Queensland	Queensland	Queensland	–
Jake Webster	–	–	–	–	–	New Zealand

== Statistics ==
This table contains playing statistics for all Melbourne Storm players to have played in the 2005 NRL season.

- Statistics sources:

Name	Appearances	Tries	Goals	Field goals	Points
Steven Bell	26	14	0	0	56
Alex Chan	14	2	0	0	8
Cooper Cronk	20	4	0	0	16
Ian Donnelly	11	0	0	0	0
Jamie Feeney	12	0	0	0	0
Nathan Friend	3	0	0	0	0
Matt Geyer	26	11	2	0	48
Josh Graham	1	4	0	0	4
Scott Hill	18	1	0	0	4
Ryan Hoffman	23	4	0	0	16
Greg Inglis	13	7	0	0	28
Dallas Johnson	24	2	0	0	8
Antonio Kaufusi	11	2	0	0	8
Robbie Kearns	25	2	0	0	8
David Kidwell	25	4	0	0	16
Matt King	23	14	0	0	56
Jamie McDonald	2	0	0	0	0
Tevita Metuisela	3	0	0	0	0
Matt Orford	26	11	63	2	172
Peter Robinson	2	1	0	0	4
Dennis Scott	19	3	0	0	12
Billy Slater	21	20	0	0	80
Cameron Smith	23	3	30	0	72
Glen Turner	23	5	0	0	20
Jake Webster	24	10	0	0	40
Brett White	24	1	0	0	4
26 players used	—	122	95	2	680

=== Scorers ===
Most points in a game: 16 points

- Round 1 – Matt Orford (2 tries, 4 goals) vs Newcastle Knights
- Round 2 – Matt Orford (2 tries, 4 goals) vs St George Illawarra Dragons

Most tries in a game: 3

- Round 1 – Billy Slater vs Newcastle Knights
- Round 16 – Billy Slater vs South Sydney Rabbitohs

=== Winning games ===
Highest score in a winning game: 50 points

- Round 4 vs Brisbane Broncos

Lowest score in a winning game: 20 points

- Round 18 vs Canberra Raiders

Greatest winning margin: 46 points

- Round 4 vs Brisbane Broncos

Greatest number of games won consecutively: 3

- Round 16 - Round 18

=== Losing games ===
Highest score in a losing game: 24 points

- Round 26 vs North Queensland Cowboys

Lowest score in a losing game: 10 points

- Round 8 vs Cronulla-Sutherland Sharks

Greatest losing margin: 24 points

- Round 22 vs Cronulla-Sutherland Sharks

Greatest number of games lost consecutively: 2

- Round 5 - Round 6
- Round 14 - Round 15
- Round 21 - Round 22

== Feeder Teams ==
Under a new affiliation agreement, Melbourne split their reserve players between two feeder clubs during the 2005 season. The agreement with Norths Devils continued for an eighth season, with players who were dual-registered in Queensland travelling to Brisbane each week to play with in the Queensland Cup. Melbourne also formed an affiliation with foundation New South Wales Rugby League club North Sydney Bears for some players to play in the NSWRL Premier League.

In a repeat of the 2004 season, the Devils finished second on the ladder, but were bundled out of the finals in straight sets.

Coached by Gary Freeman, the Bears finished tenth and missed the finals, with Alex Chan, Ian Donnelly, Jamie Feeney and Tevita Metuisela attracting praise from Freeman for their efforts.

2005 Queensland Cup
Pos	Team	Pld	W	D	L	B	PF	PA	PD	Pts
2	Norths Devils	20	15	1	4	2	719	454	+265	31
2005 NSWRL Premier League
Pos	Team	Pld	W	D	L	B	PF	PA	PD	Pts
10	North Sydney Bears	24	9	1	14	2	604	686	-82	23

== Awards and honours ==
=== Melbourne Storm Awards Night ===
Held at Grand Hyatt on Friday, 7 October:

- Melbourne Storm Player of the Year: Cameron Smith
- Best Back: Matt King
- Best Forward: Dallas Johnson
- Most Improved: Jake Webster
- Rookie of the Year: Brett White
- Try of the Year: Matt King
- Greg Brentnall Trophy (Coterie Award): Matt King
- Mick Moore Club Person of the Year: Julie Cliff
- Life Member Inductees: Robbie Kearns & Matt Geyer

=== Dally M Awards Night ===
- Dally M Top Try Scorer (regular season only): Billy Slater 19 (with Shaun Berrigan)

=== Additional Awards ===
- QRL Ron McAuliffe Medal: Cameron Smith
- NSWRL Brad Fittler Medal: Matt King
- Petero Civoniceva Medal: Greg Inglis
