= 2003 Melbourne Storm season =

- NRL Rank: 5th
- Play-off result: Semi-final Loss
- 2003 record: Wins: 15; draws: 0; losses: 9
- Points scored: For: 564; against: 486

Team information
- Executive Director & CEO: John Ribot
- Coach: Craig Bellamy
- Captain: Stephen Kearney (25 matches) Robbie Kearns (1 match)
- Stadium: Olympic Park
- Avg. attendance: 9,626 (Note: Regular season home matches in Melbourne only)
- High attendance: 11,512 (Round 19) (Note: Regular season home matches in Melbourne only)

Top scorers
- Tries: Billy Slater (19)
- Goals: Matt Orford (74)
- Points: Matt Orford (180)
← 2002	List of seasons	2004 →

The 2003 Melbourne Storm season was the sixth in the club's history. They competed in the NRL's 2003 Telstra Premiership and finished the regular season fifth out of 15 teams, before reaching the semi-final where they were knocked out by Canterbury-Bankstown Bulldogs. It was Craig Bellamy's first season as head coach of the club.

Under new coach Craig Bellamy, the 2003 season for the Storm was one of regaining premiership credibility. Melbourne reached the finals for the first time since 2000 with evergreen Robbie Kearns and a confident Matt Orford showing the way.

Speaking before the season, Bellamy outlined the challenges that required attention: "Our defensive system. Last year they were very compressed and up and out very early. The new system we're putting in is a bit different to what these blokes have been used to and we've had a few teething problems with it. They talk about defence being attitude and it is. You can talk about systems and defensive techniques all you like, but at the end of a day if a bloke's going to go in and make a tackle, he'll go in and do it. Communication and confidence are also pretty important. I haven't spoken to any of the players about the coaching staff last season. Whatever happened happened and I can't change it. I didn't want to have pre-conceived ideas about anyone. Let last year lie and just look forward. It's not only about working hard physically, it's about being prepared to work on things like technique and working smart as well."

Bellamy won the players' respect and awarded the previously disputed club captaincy to New Zealand international Stephen Kearney, who was a popular choice among the fans and players.

An exit two weeks before the Grand Final was tempered by the rise of young Queenslanders Billy Slater and Cameron Smith. Largely unheard of at the start of 2003, the steady hooker and dummy-half Smith gave service to Orford and his forwards. He was rewarded with a place in the Maroons Origin side and was unlucky to miss the Kangaroos train-on squad.

The moves of Slater in the centres and at fullback drew attention from fans and keen judges of football talent alike. His debut season for the Storm realised a record 19 tries and talk of a big future in the game.

== Season summary ==
- Pre season – Melbourne are one of four clubs fined for salary cap breaches during the 2002 NRL season. Melbourne's fine was A$66,698 relating to previous contracts voluntarily disclosed to the NRL. It was the club's fourth fine for breaching the salary cap, with the club penalised for third-party deals involving players and sponsors. Michael Russo was ruled out for the season after suffering an anterior cruciate ligament injury playing for the Queensland Emerging Origin team in October 2002. In training during the summer heat, new head coach Craig Bellamy beat his squad in a running time trial of two laps of The Tan track around Melbourne's Royal Botanic Gardens. With Russo unavailable, as well as Fifita Moala and new recruit Robert Tanielu both likely out for the season, Melbourne invited almost a dozen players from Norths Devils to preseason training.
- World Sevens – Storm participate in the return of Rugby League World Sevens, losing all three of their matches at Aussie Stadium. Steven Bell captained the squad, which included a number of new recruits and players yet to make their NRL debut.
- 13 February – New recruit Andrew McFadden had surgery after struggling with chronic groin complaint osteitis pubis through the preseason. McFadden was set to miss more than the first month of the season.
- 14 February – Stephen Kearney was appointed as Melbourne captain.
- 20 February – Reports emerged that former trackwork jockey Billy Slater had secured a spot in Melbourne's squad ahead of the season. Slater had been part of the club's development squad at Norths Devils in 2002.
- 22 February – In the club's first trial match, Melbourne thrashed South Sydney 44–24 in wet and slippery conditions in Ipswich. Billy Slater scored two tries in the match, with Matt Orford key to the Storm's points blitz, scoring 14 points with a try and five goals.
- 27 February – Willie Leyshon announced his retirement from rugby league after a succession of serious knee injuries. Leyshon blamed strength and conditioning coach Alex Corvo and physiotherapist Matt Natusch for ignoring his pleas for an altered training program due to his persistent knee injuries. Leyshon had four knee reconstructions and had been on a modified program during the preseason, forced to take a break during December 2002.
- 5 March – A number of Sydney NRL clubs voice their opposition to the NRL's decision to grant salary cap concessions to Melbourne to help support relocated players.
- 12 March – NRL CEO David Gallop throws his support behind the proposal to allow Melbourne salary cap concessions to cover relocation expenses for players. Melbourne had put forward a proposal asking the NRL for a $265,000 concession on top of the $3.25m salary cap.
- Round 1 – Recovering from a 22–0 deficit, Melbourne stage an amazing comeback victory 36–32 over Cronulla-Sutherland Sharks at Toyota Park. On his NRL debut, Billy Slater scores a stunning try to spark the comeback, with Steven Bell scoring a hat-trick.
- 18 March – Melbourne Executive Director John Ribot withdraws Melbourne's application for salary cap concessions for players living away from home, saying "Melbourne don't want to be the source of division among the other clubs." Parramatta Eels boss Denis Fitzgerald and Penrith Panthers boss Shane Richardson had been outspoken in the days since the proposal was first mooted, with Canberra Raiders also requesting salary cap concessions.
- Round 2 – Prop forward Rodney Howe suffers a serious knee injury as an understrength Melbourne thrash Penrith 42–16. Head coach Craig Bellamy praises rookie Billy Slater who scored two tries in the win, saying "he's got something special about him. I wasn't quite sure when he was going to actually show it, but he's showed it pretty early. He's a special talent." Jake Webster becomes the first Melbourne-born player to debut with the club, but it would be his only appearance for the season after injurying his anterior cruciate ligament the following week playing for Norths Devils in the Queensland Cup.
- 23 April – Aaron Moule announces his retirement from rugby league due to niggling injury problems.
- Round 7 – In his Storm debut, Andrew McFadden is injured again, succumbing to a groin injury in the first half. McFadden's injuries keep him out of the line-up for the rest of the season.
- Round 8 – Returning after a two-week injury break, Matt Orford scores 16 points in Melbourne's dominate 46–6 victory over a depleted Newcastle Knights.
- 9 May – Robbie Ross undergoes surgery on a bulging disc injury, after playing five of the opening eight games of the season.
- Round 9 – Melbourne inflict Canberra Raiders' first defeat of the season 30–10, despite an injury in the warm-up to Junior Langi.
- Round 10 – In the last game of rugby league at Brisbane's ANZ Stadium, an injury to Matt Orford cruels Melbourne's quest for a first win over the Broncos since 2001.
- 6 June – Matt Geyer signs a two-year contract extension, to keep him in Melbourne until the end of the 2005 NRL season.
- 7 June – Scott Hill re-signs with Melbourne, inking a new five-year contract.
- Round 13 – South Sydney Rabbitohs beat Melbourne for the first time, with the league cellar-dwellers stunning Melbourne 41–14.
- Round 14 – Ending a two-game winless streak, Melbourne defeat Penrith 32–12 to end the Panthers' eight-game winning streak.
- Round 15 – Five-eighth Scott Hill suffers a shoulder injury in Melbourne's loss to Canterbury-Bankstown Bulldogs. Hill had feared his season was over, but subsequent scans cleared him of a serious injury.
- Round 17 – 0–4 at the venue, Melbourne upset Canberra 18–8 to win their first game ever at Bruce Stadium.
- 9 July – Melbourne sign promising fullback Steve Turner to a three-year contract from 2004.
- 11 July – John Ribot is forced to deny rumours the club would merge with Collingwood saying, "I don't think you'll see us merging. I've got more chance of flying to the moon."
- 19 July – Robbie Kearns signs on with Melbourne for a further two seasons.
- Round 19 – Brisbane Broncos pip Melbourne 26–22 in the club's first ever golden point game, after scores were tied 22–all after 80 minutes. Broncos winger Scott Minto scores the winning try three minutes into extra time.
- 27 July – Fan-favourite Marcus Bai announces he will be leaving Melbourne at the end of the season, taking up a two-year contract with Leeds Rhinos.
- Round 21 – Melbourne reclaim the Michael Moore Trophy, winning 14–12 over New Zealand Warriors with a 41-metre penalty goal from Matt Orford the difference.
- Round 23 – After his first game back from injury since June, Scott Hill is ruled out for the rest of the season after re-injuring his troublesome shoulder.
- 4 September – In a dispute with the RLPA, the NRL cancel the annual Dally M Awards. Both Billy Slater and Cameron Smith were among the favourites for the Rookie of the Year Award.
- Round 26 – In a rousing farewell, Marcus Bai scores and converts a try in his farewell appearance at Olympic Park. Melbourne thrash Manly Warringah Sea Eagles 40–10 to finish the season in fifth place, securing the club's first finals appearance since the 2000 NRL season.
- Qualifying Final – In a controversial 30–18 upset win over Canberra, referee Tim Mander cracks down on Melbourne players employing so-called 'grapple tackles' to slow down the play-the-ball. Coach Craig Bellamy accuses Canberra of making complaints to the NRL about the tackling style, claims rejected by both the NRL and Canberra coach Matt Elliott. The controversy overshadows Melbourne's first finals win since the 1999 NRL Grand Final, causing much media talk in the days after the game between Melbourne officials, referee's boss Robert Finch and league pundits.
- Semi Final – Melbourne are eliminated from the finals in a whitewash by Canterbury-Bankstown Bulldogs, held scoreless in a 30–0 defeat. It is the first time in 158 NRL games that Melbourne had failed to score.

=== Milestone games ===
Round	Player	Milestone
Round 1	Billy Slater	NRL debut
Round 1	David Kidwell	Storm debut
Round 1	Dallas Johnson	NRL debut
Round 2	Jake Webster	NRL debut
Round 6	Ryan Hoffman	NRL debut
Round 7	Andrew McFadden	Storm debut
Round 8	Peter Robinson	50th game
Round 12	Robert Tanielu	Storm debut
Round 13	Nathan Sologinkin	Storm debut
Round 14	Dustin Cooper	NRL debut
Round 15	Marcus Bai	150th game
Round 15	Nathan Friend	Storm debut
Round 20	Steven Bell	50th game
Round 22	Antonio Kaufusi	NRL debut
Round 24	Matt King	NRL debut

=== Jerseys ===
Melbourne signed up a new apparel partner for the 2003 season, with Canterbury of New Zealand the new manufacturer of club jerseys. The home jersey design was unchanged from the 2001-02 jersey, but for a white collar replacing the gold. The club's clash colours was changed to a mostly white design with a purple chevron and gold thunderbolts, worn with navy shorts.

== Fixtures ==
=== Pre Season ===
Date	Round	Opponent	Venue	Result	Mel.	Opp.	Source
1 February	Rugby League World Sevens (Pool D)	Brisbane Broncos	Aussie Stadium, Sydney	Lost	18	38	
1 February	Rugby League World Sevens (Pool D)	Canberra Raiders	Aussie Stadium, Sydney	Lost	8	24	
2 February	Rugby League World Sevens (Bowl Quarter final)	Lebanon	Aussie Stadium, Sydney	Lost	10	20	

Date	Rd	Opponent	Venue	Result	Mel.	Opp.	Tries	Goals	Field goals	Ref
22 February	Trial	South Sydney Rabbitohs	North Ipswich Reserve, Ipswich	Won	44	24	B Slater (2), R Ross, R Kearns, D Johnson, S Bell, S Tadulala, M Orford	M Orford (5), M Geyer		
1 March	Trial	Canberra Raiders	Morwell Recreation Reserve, Morwell	Lost	4	6	R Ross			

=== Regular season ===
==== Result by round ====
Round	1	2	3	4	5	6	7	8	9	10	11	12	13	14	15	16	17	18	19	20	21	22	23	24	25	26
Ground	A	H	–	A	H	A	A	H	H	A	A	H	A	A	H	H	A	H	H	H	A	A	H	A	–	A
Result	W	W	B	L	W	L	L	W	W	L	W	L	L	W	L	W	W	W	L	W	W	L	W	W	B	W
Position	7	2	3	6	5	5	7	4	4	7	5	5	8	7	8	8	6	6	8	7	6	7	6	5	5	5
Points	2	4	6	6	8	8	8	10	12	12	14	14	14	16	16	18	20	22	22	24	26	26	28	30	32	34

Source: Rugby League Tables
A = Away; H = Home; N = Neutral; B = Bye; W = Win; D = Draw; L = Loss

==== Matches ====
- (g.p.) – Golden Point extra time
- (pen) – Penalty try

Date	Rd	Opponent	Venue	Result	Mel.	Opp.	Tries	Goals	Field goals	Ref
16 March	1	Cronulla-Sutherland Sharks	Toyota Park, Sydney	Won	36	32	S Bell (3), M Geyer (2), M Orford, B Slater	M Orford 4/7		
22 March	2	Penrith Panthers	Olympic Park, Melbourne	Won	42	16	B Slater (2), S Tadulala (2), M Geyer, P Robinson, C Smith, D Williams	M Geyer 5/9		
29 March	3	Bye								
5 April	4	Newcastle Knights	EnergyAustralia Stadium, Newcastle	Lost	28	44	A Moule (2), M Bai, M Orford, R Ross	M Orford 4/5		
12 April	5	Cronulla-Sutherland Sharks	Olympic Park, Melbourne	Won	18	12	B Slater (2), M Bai	M Orford 2/2, C Smith 1/1		
20 April	6	Manly Warringah Sea Eagles	Brookvale Oval, Sydney	Lost	14	20	R Ross, B Slater, S Tadulala	C Smith 1/1, M Turner 0/2		
26 April	7	North Queensland Cowboys	Dairy Farmers Stadium, Townsville	Lost	12	32	M Bai, M Sargent	C Smith 2/2		
3 May	8	Newcastle Knights	Olympic Park, Melbourne	Won	46	6	B Slater (2), S Bell, S Kearney, D Kidwell, M Orford, R Ross, C Smith	M Orford 6/8, C Smith 1/1		
10 May	9	Canberra Raiders	Olympic Park, Melbourne	Won	30	10	S Bell, M Geyer, K Reynoldson, P Robinson	M Orford 7/7		
18 May	10	Brisbane Broncos	ANZ Stadium, Brisbane	Lost	16	36	M Geyer, D Kidwell, B Slater	M Orford 1/2, C Smith 1/1		
24 May	11	Parramatta Eels	Parramatta Stadium, Sydney	Won	12	10	S Kearney, S Tadulala	M Orford 2/4		
1 June	12	Sydney Roosters	Olympic Park, Melbourne	Lost	20	27	S Bell (2), M Orford	M Orford 4/4		
8 June	13	South Sydney Rabbitohs	Aussie Stadium, Sydney	Lost	14	41	M Bai, M Geyer, K Reynoldson	M Orford 1/3		
14 June	14	Penrith Panthers	Penrith Park, Sydney	Won	32	12	M Bai, M Geyer, R Kearns, D Kidwell, M Orford	M Orford 6/6		
22 June	15	Canterbury-Bankstown Bulldogs	Olympic Park, Melbourne	Lost	12	26	B Slater	M Orford 4/4		
28 June	16	Wests Tigers	Olympic Park, Melbourne	Won	16	8	B Slater (2), D Cooper	M Orford 2/3		
6 July	17	Canberra Raiders	Bruce Stadium, Canberra	Won	18	8	S Bell, M Geyer, F Moala	M Orford 2/2, C Smith 1/1		
12 July	18	North Queensland Cowboys	Olympic Park, Melbourne	Won	22	16	M Geyer, R Hoffman, F Moala, M Orford	M Orford 3/6		
20 July	19	Brisbane Broncos	Olympic Park, Melbourne	Lost (g.p.)	22	26	M Bai, R Hoffman, F Moala, B Slater	M Orford 3/5		
26 July	20	South Sydney Rabbitohs	Olympic Park, Melbourne	Won	24	6	B Slater (2), M Geyer, R Kearns	M Orford 4/5		
2 August	21	New Zealand Warriors	Ericsson Stadium, Auckland	Won	14	12	M Bai, K Reynoldson	M Orford 3/4		
10 August	22	Canterbury-Bankstown Bulldogs	Sydney Showground, Sydney	Lost	4	50	M Geyer	M Orford 0/1		
17 August	23	Parramatta Eels	Olympic Park, Melbourne	Won	50	12	B Slater (3), M Bai, S Bell, F Moala, M Orford, C Smith, D Williams	M Orford 6/8, C Smith 1/2		
22 August	24	St George Illawarra Dragons	WIN Stadium, Wollongong	Won	22	14	F Moala (2), M Sargent, B Slater	M Orford 3/5		
30 August	25	Bye								
6 September	26	Manly Warringah Sea Eagles	Olympic Park, Melbourne	Won	40	10	M Geyer (2), M Bai, S Bell, M King, F Moala, D Williams	M Orford 4/5, M Bai 1/1, M Sargent 1/1		

=== Finals ===
First qualifying final

Friday, 12 September
19:30 AEST (UTC+10)

Canberra Raiders	18 – 30	Melbourne Storm
Tries: 3 J Monaghan 15'; Lolesi 21'; M Monaghan 80'; Goals: 3 Schifcofski pen 11', 22', 80' (3/4)	1st: 12–16; 2nd: 6–14; Report	Tries: 6 Bai 26', 68'; Orford 29'; Moala 32'; Geyer 48'; Smith 63'; Goals: 3 Orford 30', 33', 64' (3/6)

Bruce Stadium, Canberra
Attendance: 14,094
Referee: Tim Mander

Second semi final

Sunday, 21 September
15:00 AEST (UTC+10)

Melbourne Storm	0 – 30	Canterbury-Bankstown Bulldogs
	1st: 0–13; 2nd: 0–17; Report	Tries: 5 Vagana 9', 69'; C Hughes 29'; Mason 46'; Perry 76'; Goals: 4 El Masri pen 28', 30', pen 58', 77'(4/7); Field goals: 2 Braith Anasta 39', 80'

Aussie Stadium, Sydney
Attendance: 19,367
Referee: Bill Harrigan

== Ladder ==
2003 NRL season
Pos	Team	Pld	W	D	L	B	PF	PA	PD	Pts
1	Penrith Panthers (P)	24	18	0	6	2	659	527	+132	40
2	Sydney Roosters	24	17	0	7	2	680	445	+235	38
3	Canterbury-Bankstown Bulldogs	24	16	0	8	2	702	419	+283	36
4	Canberra Raiders	24	16	0	8	2	620	463	+157	36
5	Melbourne Storm	24	15	0	9	2	564	486	+78	34
6	New Zealand Warriors	24	15	0	9	2	545	510	+35	34
7	Newcastle Knights	24	14	0	10	2	632	635	-3	32
8	Brisbane Broncos	24	12	0	12	2	497	464	+33	28
9	Parramatta Eels	24	11	0	13	2	570	582	-12	26
10	St George Illawarra Dragons	24	11	0	13	2	548	593	-45	26
11	North Queensland Cowboys	24	10	0	14	2	606	629	-23	24
12	Cronulla-Sutherland Sharks	24	8	0	16	2	497	704	-207	20
13	Wests Tigers	24	7	0	17	2	470	598	-128	18
14	Manly-Warringah Sea Eagles	24	7	0	17	2	557	791	-234	18
15	South Sydney Rabbitohs	24	3	0	21	2	457	758	-301	10

== 2003 Coaching Staff ==
- Head coach: Craig Bellamy
- Assistant coach: Dean Lance
- Football manager: Greg Brentnall
- Physical Preparation Coach: Alex Corvo
- Physiotherapist: Matt Natusch
- Head trainer: Troy Thompson

== 2003 squad ==
List current as of 6 September 2021

Cap (Note: Players are listed with the cap number as they appear on the Melbourne Storm honour board. Additional squad members do not have a cap number.)	Nat.	Player name	Position	First Storm Game	Previous First Grade RL club (Note: This column denotes the previous RL club the player was signed to and played first grade RL for. If they are yet to debut then this is stipulated. If they were merely signed to the club but did not play then it is not counted.)
1	(Australia)	Robbie Ross	FB	1998	(Australia) Hunter Mariners
3	(Australia)	Aaron Moule	WG, CE	1998	(Australia) South Queensland Crushers
5	(Papua New Guinea)	Marcus Bai	WG	1998	(Australia) Gold Coast Chargers
6	(Australia)	Scott Hill	FE	1998	(Australia) Hunter Mariners
8	(Australia)	Rodney Howe	PR	1998	(Australia) Perth Reds
9	(Australia)	Danny Williams	LK, SR, HK	1998	(Australia) North Sydney Bears
10	(Australia)	Robbie Kearns	PR	1998	(Australia) Perth Reds
18	(Australia)	Matt Geyer	WG	1998	(Australia) Perth Reds
28	(New Zealand)	Stephen Kearney	SR	1999	(Australia) New Zealand Warriors
34	(Tonga)	Fifita Moala	WG	2000	(Australia) Melbourne Storm
37	(New Zealand)	Glen Turner	SR	2000	(Australia) Melbourne Storm
38	(Australia)	Peter Robinson	SR	2000	(Australia) Melbourne Storm
42	(New Zealand)	Junior Langi	CE	2001	(Australia) St George Illawarra Dragons
43	(Australia)	Matt Orford	HB	2001	(Australia) Northern Eagles
44	(Australia)	Steven Bell	CE	2001	(Australia) Melbourne Storm
48	(Fiji)	Semi Tadulala	WG	2001	(Australia) Melbourne Storm
51	(Australia)	Mitchell Sargent	PR	2002	(Australia) Melbourne Storm
53	(Australia)	Michael Russo	SR	2002	(Australia) Melbourne Storm
54	(New Zealand)	Marty Turner	HB	2002	(Australia) Melbourne Storm
55	(Australia)	Cameron Smith	HK	2002	(Australia) Melbourne Storm
56	(Australia)	Kirk Reynoldson	SR	2002	(Australia) Melbourne Storm
57	(England)	Keith Mason	PR	2002	(England) Wakefield Trinity Wildcats
58	(Australia)	Billy Slater	FB	2003	(Australia) Melbourne Storm
59	(New Zealand)	David Kidwell	SR	2003	(Australia) Sydney Roosters
60	(Australia)	Dallas Johnson	LK	2003	(Australia) Melbourne Storm
61	(New Zealand)	Jake Webster	WG	2003	(Australia) Melbourne Storm
62	(Australia)	Ryan Hoffman	SR	2003	(Australia) Melbourne Storm
63	(Australia)	Andrew McFadden	HB	2003	(Australia) Parramatta Eels
64	(New Zealand)	Robert Tanielu	PR	2003	(Australia) Brisbane Broncos
65	(Australia)	Nathan Sologinkin	SR	2003	(Australia) Canterbury-Bankstown Bulldogs
66	(Australia)	Dustin Cooper	WG	2003	(Australia) Melbourne Storm
67	(Australia)	Nathan Friend	HK	2003	(Australia) Brisbane Broncos
68	(Australia)	Antonio Kaufusi	PR	2003	(Australia) Melbourne Storm
69	(Australia)	Matt King	CE	2003	(Australia) Melbourne Storm
—	(Australia)	Marc Brentnall	HB	Yet to debut	(Australia) Melbourne Storm (Note: Brentnall played in the 2003 World Sevens tournament)
—	(Australia)	Cooper Cronk	HB	Yet to debut	(Australia) Melbourne Storm
—	(Australia)	Brett Finn	HK	Yet to debut	(Australia) Melbourne Storm (Note: Finn played in the 2003 World Sevens tournament, and the trial game against South Sydney Rabbitohs. He was later released and played for Souths in the 2004 World Sevens tournament.)

== Player movements ==
Losses

- William Leyshon to Parramatta Eels
- Keith Mason to St Helens (mid season)
- Henry Perenara to St George Illawarra Dragons
- Ian Sibbit to Warrington Wolves
- Richard Swain to Brisbane Broncos
- Shane Walker to Retirement

Gains

- Nathan Friend from Brisbane Broncos
- David Kidwell from Sydney Roosters
- Andrew McFadden from Parramatta Eels
- Nathan Sologinkin from Canterbury-Bankstown Bulldogs
- Robert Tanielu from Brisbane Broncos

== Representative honours ==
This table lists all players who have played a representative match in 2003.

Player	City vs Country Origin	State of Origin 1	State of Origin 2	State of Origin 3	Midseason Test (Note: Test between Australia vs New Zealand)	2003 Kangaroo tour
Robbie Kearns	City (c)	New South Wales	New South Wales	New South Wales	—N/a	Australia
Stephen Kearney	—N/a	—N/a	—N/a	—N/a	New Zealand	—N/a
Cameron Smith	—N/a	—N/a	—N/a	Queensland	—N/a	—N/a

== Statistics ==
This table contains playing statistics for all Melbourne Storm players to have played in the 2003 NRL season.

- Statistics sources:

Name	Appearances	Tries	Goals	Field goals	Points
Marcus Bai	26	11	1	0	46
Steven Bell	22	10	0	0	40
Dustin Cooper	4	1	0	0	4
Nathan Friend	7	0	0	0	0
Matt Geyer	26	14	5	0	66
Scott Hill	8	0	0	0	0
Ryan Hoffman	13	2	0	0	8
Rodney Howe	2	0	0	0	0
Dallas Johnson	22	0	0	0	0
Antonio Kaufusi	1	0	0	0	0
Stephen Kearney	25	2	0	0	8
Robbie Kearns	23	2	0	0	8
David Kidwell	26	3	0	0	12
Matt King	4	1	0	0	4
Junior Langi	2	0	0	0	0
Andrew McFadden	1	0	0	0	0
Keith Mason	3	0	0	0	0
Fifita Moala	12	8	0	0	32
Aaron Moule	2	2	0	0	8
Matt Orford	24	8	74	0	180
Kirk Reynoldson	26	3	0	0	12
Peter Robinson	24	2	0	0	8
Robbie Ross	5	3	0	0	12
Mitchell Sargent	23	2	1	0	10
Billy Slater	26	19	0	0	76
Cameron Smith	24	4	8	0	32
Nathan Sologinkin	1	0	0	0	0
Semi Tadulala	12	4	0	0	16
Robert Tanielu	2	0	0	0	0
Glen Turner	20	0	0	0	0
Marty Turner	1	0	0	0	0
Jake Webster	1	0	0	0	0
Danny Williams	25	3	0	0	12
33 players used	—	104	89	0	594

=== Scorers ===
Most points in a game: 16 points

- Round 8 – Matt Orford (1 try, 6 goals) vs Newcastle Knights
- Round 14 – Matt Orford (1 try, 6 goals) vs Penrith Panthers
- Round 23 – Matt Orford (1 try, 6 goals) vs Parramatta Eels

Most tries in a game: 3

- Round 1 – Steven Bell vs Cronulla-Sutherland Sharks
- Round 23 – Billy Slater vs Parramatta Eels

=== Winning games ===
Highest score in a winning game: 50 points

- Round 23 vs Parramatta Eels

Lowest score in a winning game: 12 points

- Round 11 vs Parramatta Eels

Greatest winning margin: 40 points

- Round 8 vs Newcastle Knights

Greatest number of games won consecutively: 4

- Round 23 - Qualifying Final

=== Losing games ===
Highest score in a losing game: 28 points

- Round 4 vs Newcastle Knights

Lowest score in a losing game: 0 points

- Semi Final vs Canterbury-Bankstown Bulldogs

Greatest losing margin: 46 points

- Round 22 vs Canterbury-Bankstown Bulldogs

Greatest number of games lost consecutively: 2

- Round 6 – Round 7
- Round 12 – Round 13

=== NRL Judiciary ===
A number of Melbourne players were cited by the match review committee for incidents through the 2003 season, with the following results from the NRL Judiciary.

Round	Player	Offence & grade	Result (Note: 100 demerit points equals one match suspension.)	Ref
Round 10	Cameron Smith	Dangerous throw (Grade 1)	Not guilty	
Round 13	Mitchell Sargent	Dangerous throw (Grade 1)	1 match (135 demerit points)	
Round 14	Danny Williams	Striking (Grade 1)	1 match (167 demerit points)	
Round 18	Glen Turner	Careless high tackle (Grade 2)	No matches (93 demerit points)	
Round 19	Dallas Johnson	Dangerous throw (Grade 1)	1 match (150 demerit points)	
Round 21	Cameron Smith	Dangerous throw (Grade 1)	1 match (112 demerit points)	
Round 21	Mitchell Sargent	Dangerous throw (Grade 1)	2 matches (290 demerit points)	

== Feeder Team ==
Melbourne Storm reserve players again travelled to Brisbane each week to play with Queensland Cup team Norths Devils. Former Storm coach Mark Murray returned to the club as CEO, with the team coached by Gary Greinke. Norths missed the finals for the first time under the affiliation with Melbourne, with Cooper Cronk winning club's player of the year award.

2003 Queensland Cup
Pos	Team	Pld	W	D	L	PF	PA	PD	Pts
8	Norths Devils	22	10	1	11	615	589	+26	21

== Awards and honours ==
=== Melbourne Storm Awards Night ===
Held at the Regent Theatre on Friday, 10 October:

- Melbourne Storm Player of the Year: Robbie Kearns
- Melbourne Storm Rookie of the Year: Cameron Smith
- Melbourne Storm Clubman of the Year: Marcus Bai
- Mick Moore Chairman's Award: Danny Williams
- Hit of the Year: Danny Williams
