= Ian Donnelly =

Australian rugby league footballer

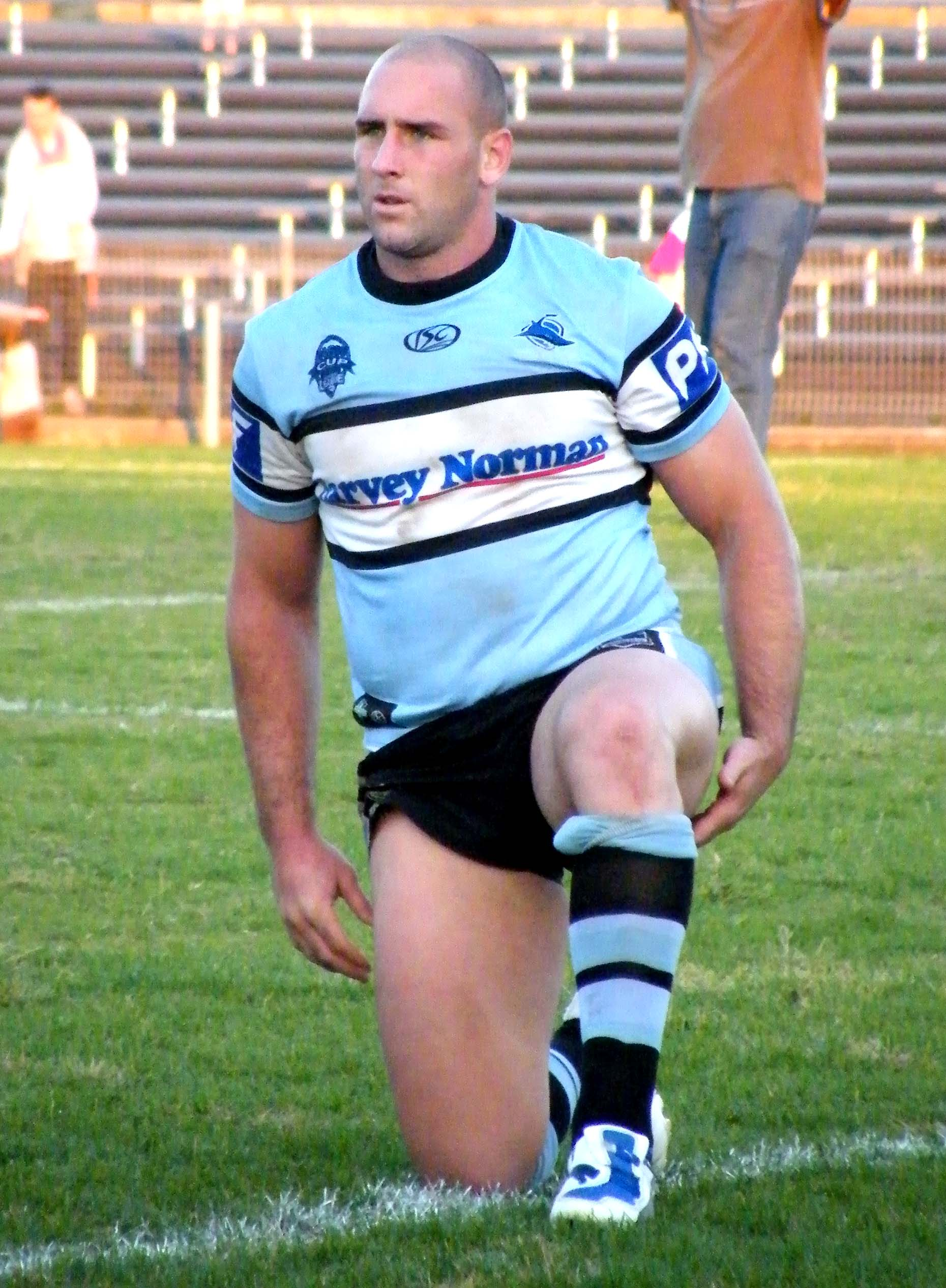

Personal information
- Born: 28 January 1981 (age 45) Newcastle, New South Wales, Australia

Playing information
- Height: 185 cm (6 ft 1 in)
- Weight: 110 kg (17 st 5 lb)
- Position: Prop
Club
Years	Team	Pld	T	G	FG	P
2003	St George Illawarra	17	0	0	0	0
2004	Manly Sea Eagles	14	1	0	0	4
2005–07	Melbourne Storm	30	1	0	0	4
2007	Gold Coast Titans	12	1	0	0	4
2009	Cronulla Sharks	7	0	0	0	0
	Total	80	3	0	0	12

Ian Donnelly (born 28 January 1981) is an Australian former professional rugby league footballer who played as a prop in the 2000s. He played in the National Rugby League for the Cronulla-Sutherland Sharks, Gold Coast Titans, Melbourne Storm, Manly-Warringah Sea Eagles and the St George Illawarra Dragons.

== Early life ==
Born in Newcastle, New South Wales, Donnelly was educated at St John's College, Woodlawn.

Ian played his junior rugby league for Marist Brothers Rams, Lismore.

== Playing career ==
Donnelly played for St George Illawarra Dragons, Manly Sea Eagles and Gold Coast Titans.

He made his Melbourne Storm debut in round 3 of the 2005 NRL season against the Sea Eagles. Donnelly played over 30 first grade games for Melbourne Storm, before moving to the Titans.
