= Nathan Sologinkin =

Australian rugby league footballer

Personal information
- Full name: Nathan Sologinkin
- Born: 1 June 1978 (age 48) Mackay, Queensland, Australia

Playing information
- Position: Second-row
Club
Years	Team	Pld	T	G	FG	P
1997	South Queensland	10	1	0	0	4
1998–99	Canberra Raiders	13	0	0	0	0
2000–02	Canterbury Bankstown	8	1	0	0	4
2003	Melbourne Storm	1	0	0	0	0
	Total	32	2	0	0	8

Nathan Sologinkin (born 1 June 1978) is a former rugby league footballer of the 1990s and 2000s. He played for the South Queensland Crushers in 1997, the Canberra Raiders from 1998 to 1999, the Canterbury-Bankstown Bulldogs in 2000 and 2002 and finally the Melbourne Storm in 2003.

In December 2020, Sologinkin lost his appeal against a conviction for indecent assault dating from July 2017.
