= 2001 Melbourne Storm season =

- NRL Rank: 9th
- 2001 record: Wins: 11; draws: 1; losses: 14
- Points scored: For: 704; against: 725

Team information
- Executive Director: John Ribot
- Coach: Chris Anderson; Mark Murray
- Captain: Robbie Kearns (23 matches) Rodney Howe (2 matches) Robbie Ross (1 match)
- Stadium: Docklands Stadium
- Avg. attendance: 11,969 (Note: Regular season home matches in Melbourne only)
- High attendance: 15,470 (Round 21) (Note: Regular season home matches in Melbourne only)

Top scorers
- Tries: Matt Orford (15), Aaron Moule (15)
- Goals: Matt Orford (78)
- Points: Matt Orford (216)
← 2000	List of seasons	2002 →

The 2001 Melbourne Storm season was the fourth in the club's history. They competed in the NRL's 2001 Telstra Premiership and finished the regular season in ninth place.

The 2001 season was the least successful in the Storm's history, missing the play-offs for the first time. After making a decision to move base from Olympic Park to the larger Colonial Stadium, the club seemed to lack the support, atmosphere and composure they had built up. It reflected in the team's on field performances, losing four of their first six homes games and seven from their opening ten overall. Amidst this time the Storm was rocked when coach Chris Anderson quit the club after the 42–18 loss to Parramatta in round 7.

Speaking to the media following the coaching change, Executive Director John Ribot said that Anderson "has helped write a fantastic chapter in rugby league at Melbourne. Winning the competition (in 1999) was one of those magic moments in sport. It is a great springboard for our future. We have to make sure we don't waste those first years. We have to build on that. We've got a taste of success and want more."

Along with captain Robbie Kearns, hooker Richard Swain, and halfback Matt Orford, replacement coach Mark Murray lifted the Storm from their bad beginning. Murray's disciplined approach to training and adjusted defensive structure put the club back on track through the middle of the season. After his appointment, Melbourne won seven of their next ten games to reach as high as sixth place on the NRL ladder by round 18. But the bad start to the season had taken its toll, and with the 2001 finals in sight they won only two more games. A last round loss to Canberra saw the Storm finish outside the final eight places.

The 2001 season continued to mark the endurability of Kiwi Test hooker Swain. He was on the field for every minute of the Storm's season and had yet to miss a game for Melbourne in the club's history.

== Season summary ==
- 10 January – Melbourne appoint new assistant coach Anthony Griffin following the departure of Steve Anderson. Griffin had previously been the coach of the Norths Devils junior team.
- 27 January – In their first preseason match, Melbourne defeated Penrith 40–18 in Albury. Before the match, five friends of Storm rookie Nic Henderson were killed when their car was hit by the New South Wales XPT at a level crossing near Albury on their way to the match from Wagga Wagga.
- 1 February – The club confirms its 25-man squad for the season with Jason Wrigley, Marty Turner, Glen Turner, Nic Henderson and Tai Lavea set to head to Norths Devils after missing out on the final cut to the squad. Chris Anderson quoted as saying "it's a very good, strong squad with a good blend of young blokes and senior players and we'll be very competitive. We didn't achieve what we wanted to achieve last season and I'm really looking forward to the year ahead."
- 2 February – In the club's final preseason match, former Storm halfback Brett Kimmorley got one back against his old teammates, leading the Northern Eagles to a 40–30 win at Brookvale Oval. Matt Orford scored two tries for Melbourne in the match.
- 13 February – Melbourne were fined A$23,500 for breaches of the NRL Salary Cap rules for the 2000 season.
- Round 1 – 15,070 fans watch the first ever Australian rugby league game played indoors, as Melbourne go down 14–10 against Canterbury-Bankstown Bulldogs at Colonial Stadium. The Bulldogs led 8–2 at half time, but surrendered that advantage after the break, before scoring a try through Willie Mason in the final ten minutes to take the win. Storm officials were disappointed with the attendance under the roof, with high summer temperatures a contributing factor. Referee Tim Mander, the touch judges and video referees are dropped after the round for failing to send off Storm prop forward Rodney Howe for a reckless high tackle on Steve Price. Howe is suspended for six games after pleading guilty to the charge.
- Round 2 – Continuing their poor start to the season, Melbourne fell behind 22–6 during the first half of their match against the North Queensland Cowboys. The Storm attempted a comeback late in the second half, scoring 22 points, but fell to a second successive defeat, losing 32–28 at their new home ground. There was a complaint from the Cowboys about the banner displayed by the Storm before the match which described the Cowboys as the weakest link. Cowboys CEO Rabieh Krayem contacting the NRL to complain saying: "humour has a place in rugby league but the banner the Storm came up with wasn't funny. I think you'll find that the NRL has a bit to say to the Storm about the issue."
- 1 March – Chris Anderson takes to the media to deny reports that he was set to quit the club after being linked to other head coaching roles. There were also rumours that Anderson had fallen out with club management during contract negotiations.
- Round 3 – Melbourne notch their first win of the season, defeating the St. George Illawarra Dragons 20–16 in Wollongong. Halfback Matt Orford scored the winning try with eight minutes remaining. Brad Watts scored two tries in the match.
- 4 March – Chris Anderson admits that he is in conflict with the club, writing in his weekly newspaper column: "obviously with me, there is a conflict with the place I am working at. But that is no one's problem but mine. It is something I will have to work out with my club and my players. To be linked with other jobs is a process that the media takes on, and I understand that."
- Round 4 – Melbourne defeat the Cronulla Sharks 34–24, breaking through for their first win at Colonial Stadium for the season. The Storm had the benefit of a couple of contentious referee decisions during the match. Matt Geyer scored a try on the fulltime siren, touching down following a break from Matt Orford. Referees boss Peter Louis later backing the referee and video referee's decisions and that they had followed the correct procedures.
- Round 5 – Against a depleted Wests Tigers at Leichhardt Oval, Melbourne are humbled 40–10 to slump to their worst loss of the season so far. Centre Aaron Moule was reported by the referee for kicking during a sideline melee late in the match. Moule was not be charged by the match review.
- Round 6 – Despite a ruling from the NRL, the Colonial Stadium roof stays open due to a "technical glitch" for Melbourne's game against the Newcastle Knights. The match was played a day after the venue hosted a disaster relief concert, with parts of the much-maligned turf having been relaid before the match. Melbourne suffered another defeat at the venue, falling behind 30–0 in the first half. They recovered in the second half, to lose 36–28 after scoring five tries. Chris Anderson calling the team "atrocious," with the team missing 35 tackles in the match, double that of the Knights. Robbie Ross suffered his second hamstring injury of the season in the loss. He had previously missed two matches with the injury. It was also reported that Rodney Howe and Danny Williams were involved in a punch-up at training before the match during an informal game of cricket.
- Round 7 – Melbourne lost their third match in a row, falling 42–18 against the Parramatta Eels. The Storm were behind 18–0 at half time as the home team rode their luck to score three tries. After half time, Melbourne reduced the margin to six points, but the Eels ran in four tries in eight minutes to cruise to victory. Despite the loss, Chris Anderson was pleased with the team's performance "for the first time this year I think I can see a little bit of light at the end of the tunnel. But every time we got into the game we kept shooting ourselves in the foot. I hadn't seen any light until now so there was some improvement."

Things weren't working out between myself and the club and it was better that we end it now. We were coming at it from different backgrounds. I come from a traditional club and (Chris Johns) and Ribot come from the Brisbane Broncos and we all got fed up. There were three strong personalities and we all had different ways of going about things and it was starting to affect my performance and that of the team.

— Chris Anderson following his resignation as head coach
- 2 April – Head coach Chris Anderson quits after the club's poor start to the season and rumours of a falling out with club management. It had been reported that Anderson had already been signed as the replacement for the outgoing Cronulla-Sutherland Sharks coach John Lang. Norths Devils coach Mark Murray was installed as caretaker coach, with captain Robbie Kearns hearing the news about Anderson from the media. Another sticking point in the breakdown in the relationship between Anderson and Storm management was the difference in coaching philosophy, and the way Ben Anderson was released by the Storm at the end of the 1999 season.

At the back of everybody's mind is the fear that Mark Murray might have a few ideas of his own and we hope that he won't upend us. We have a good structure. No one thought (Anderson) would go during the season. The earliest we thought something might happen was at the end of the season. There are a few players very disappointed because Chris was a great guy and a terrific coach to us and we would have liked him to stick with us.

— Robbie Kearns, after receiving the news of the departure of Chris Anderson
- 5 April – It's revealed that the club had approached former Brisbane Broncos captain Kevin Walters to take over from Mark Murray as coach at the Norths Devils. Walters eventually stayed with the Broncos after the Brisbane club offered him a new role in their coaching structure. Murray meanwhile would be coach of the Storm without a formal contract, having only a "handshake agreement" with John Ribot.
- Round 8 – In the club's first match under new coach Mark Murray, Melbourne push defending premier Brisbane to a close 18–16 loss, the Storm's fourth straight defeat. Marcus Bai had scored a late try to bring the Storm within two points, but the sideline conversion attempt from Matt Orford missed with three minutes remaining. Melbourne were then unable to steal the victory in the final minutes. Rodney Howe returned from suspension in the match after missing the previous six matches through suspension. It was the Broncos first win against Melbourne since the 1998 season.
- 9 April – Storm owners News Limited indicate that the company was willing to sell its 50% share of the North Queensland Cowboys, but had no intention of deserting Melbourne. News Limited assuring the club, of which it was the 70% major shareholder. CEO Malcolm Noad saying: "we still fund Melbourne, but they are a reasonably young club. They, too, will be expected to stand on their feet in the reasonably near future."
- Round 9 – On Good Friday, halfback Matt Orford outpoints former Melbourne halfback Brett Kimmorley in the former Storm halfback's first game in Northern Eagles colours against Melbourne. Aaron Moule equals the club record with four tries in the game. Scores had been tied at 12–all at half time before Melbourne scored seven tries in the second half to take a confidence building victory.
- Round 10 – After building a 16–6 lead in the first half, Melbourne are run down by the Sydney Roosters to lose 23–22 with Paul Green slotting a field goal two minutes from the fulltime. In a physical match, costly errors from Melbourne were noted by the Storm players following the match, while Mark Murray said after the match that "we didn't play as well as we should have in the first half with the ball and didn't play as well as we should have in the second half without the ball." Referee Steve Clark came under criticism from club CEO Chris Johns for not using the video referee on a decision not to award a potential try to Russell Bawden early in the second half after the forward looked to have grounded the ball over the line.
- 24 April – Former head coach Chris Anderson is appointed head coach of Cronulla-Sutherland Sharks from the 2002 season.
- Round 11 – The Storm bounce back to score eight tries in a 58–14 thrashing of the Penrith Panthers. Melbourne had led 14–4 at half time, with both Danny Williams and Matt Orford each scoring two tries. Robbie Ross returned from injury in the match, while both Rodney Howe and Robbie Kearns impressed ahead of Origin selection.
- Round 12 – In the club's first trip back to Auckland since the death of football manager Mick Moore in 2000, Melbourne continued their good form to take a 40–20 victory to retain the Michael Moore Trophy. The Storm shot out to an early advantage, leading 24–2 at half time, extending that advantage to 40–8 before the home team scored two consolation tries.
- Round 13 – Missing captain Robbie Kearns through a minor rib injury, Robbie Ross was named as stand-in captain for the Storm in their thrilling 32–28 win over the Canberra Raiders at Colonial Stadium. Matt Geyer had scored two tries in the match, but with scores level at 28–all, Peter Robinson scored a solo try three minutes from fulltime to win the match. Robinson diving over from dummy half after fooling the Raiders with a dummy pass. The club's third win in a row took Melbourne into the top eight for the first time since round 4.The win was soured by another injury concern for Ross, who left the field during the second half with a reoccurance of his hamstring injury.
- 24 May – Fullback Robbie Ross undergoes surgery on a chronic hamstring injury that is expected to sideline him for six weeks. In his place, Melbourne select former Australian Schoolboys rugby union halfback Paul Sheedy.
- 25 May – Melbourne poach St. George Illawarra Dragons junior coach Peter O'Sullivan to work as a talent scout for the club.
- Round 14 – Richard Swain played his 100th consecutive first grade game. Swain had played every minute of the season to date, the only forward across the NRL to do so. With both Robbie Kearns and Robbie Ross injured, Rodney Howe is appointed as acting captain for the match after impressing coach Mark Murray. A hoodoo team for Melbourne, the Bulldogs beat the Storm 28–26 with centre Nigel Vagana scoring three tries. Melbourne almost stole the result late in the match, falling short after trailling by 12 points with Matt Orford unable to convert a try by Marcus Bai in the final minutes to force a draw.
- Round 15 – Without Robbie Kearns again, Melbourne made hard work of a 38–24 victory over the North Queensland Cowboys, almost letting go of a 22–6 half time lead. The Cowboys got to within four points of the Storm, before late tries to Stephen Kearney and Henry Perenara sealed the win. Stand-in captain Rodney Howe was injured in the match, as was Aaron Moule. Howe would miss one match after surgery on his left knee.
- Round 16 – Tasesa Lavea becomes the first Melbourne player to be an unused interchange player in club history. Fifita Moala makes his first appearance for the season after injuring his knee during the 2000 Rugby League World Cup.Moala scored a try in a high-scoring match, as Melbourne defeated the Dragons 34–28 at Colonial Stadium. Matt Geyer scored the match-winning try following a 90-metre run, one of two very long-range tries Melbourne scored in the match.
- 19 June – Melbourne release prop forward Brenton Pomery from the remainder of his contract with the club, the 28-year-old had not played at NRL level since round 2.
- Round 17 – Mark Murray drops Queensland Origin forward Russell Bawden from the team, while despite a hand injury that threatened to keep him out of the team, Richard Swain continues his streak of consecutive matches for the club. In a disappointing 40–18 loss against the Sharks, Scott Hill suffered a knee injury that saw him stretched off the field in the second half. Melbourne conceded seven tries in the match, with Mark Murray suggesting that the players "attitude and not matching the opposition's intensity in the game" where the Storm were beaten. The injury to Hill would keep him out of action for six weeks, while there were also fears that Fifita Moala had also injured the knee that had kept him out for much of the season. After scans, both Hill and Moala escaped surgery on their injuries.
- 1 July – The Sunday Mail reports that the Queensland Government has confirmed that it held talks with the Melbourne Storm about relocating to Brisbane and basing itself at Lang Park. John Ribot admitted he had spoken to the Queensland Government "but we're not going anywhere."

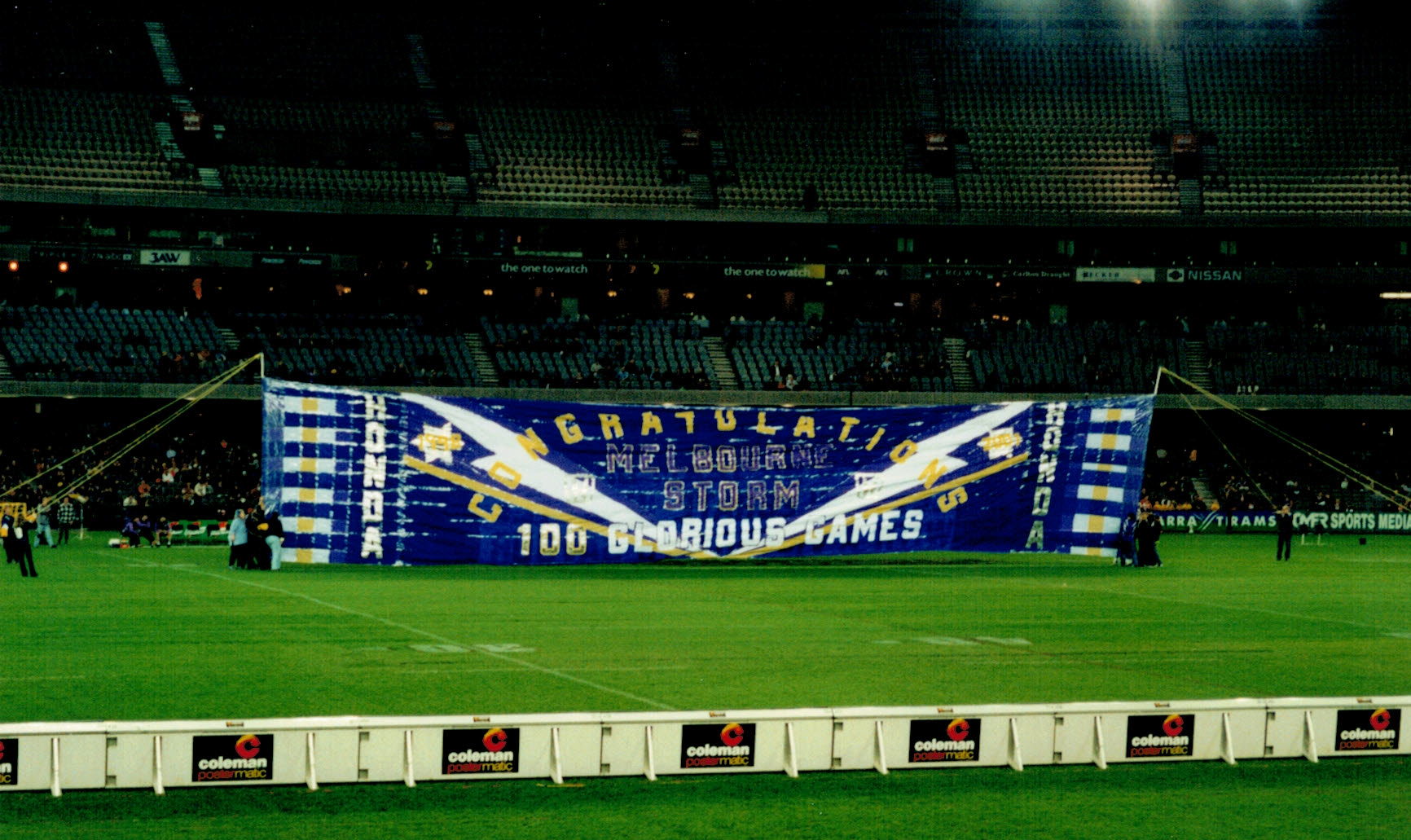
Mebourne Storm 100th game banner unfurled before the round 18 match against Wests Tigers

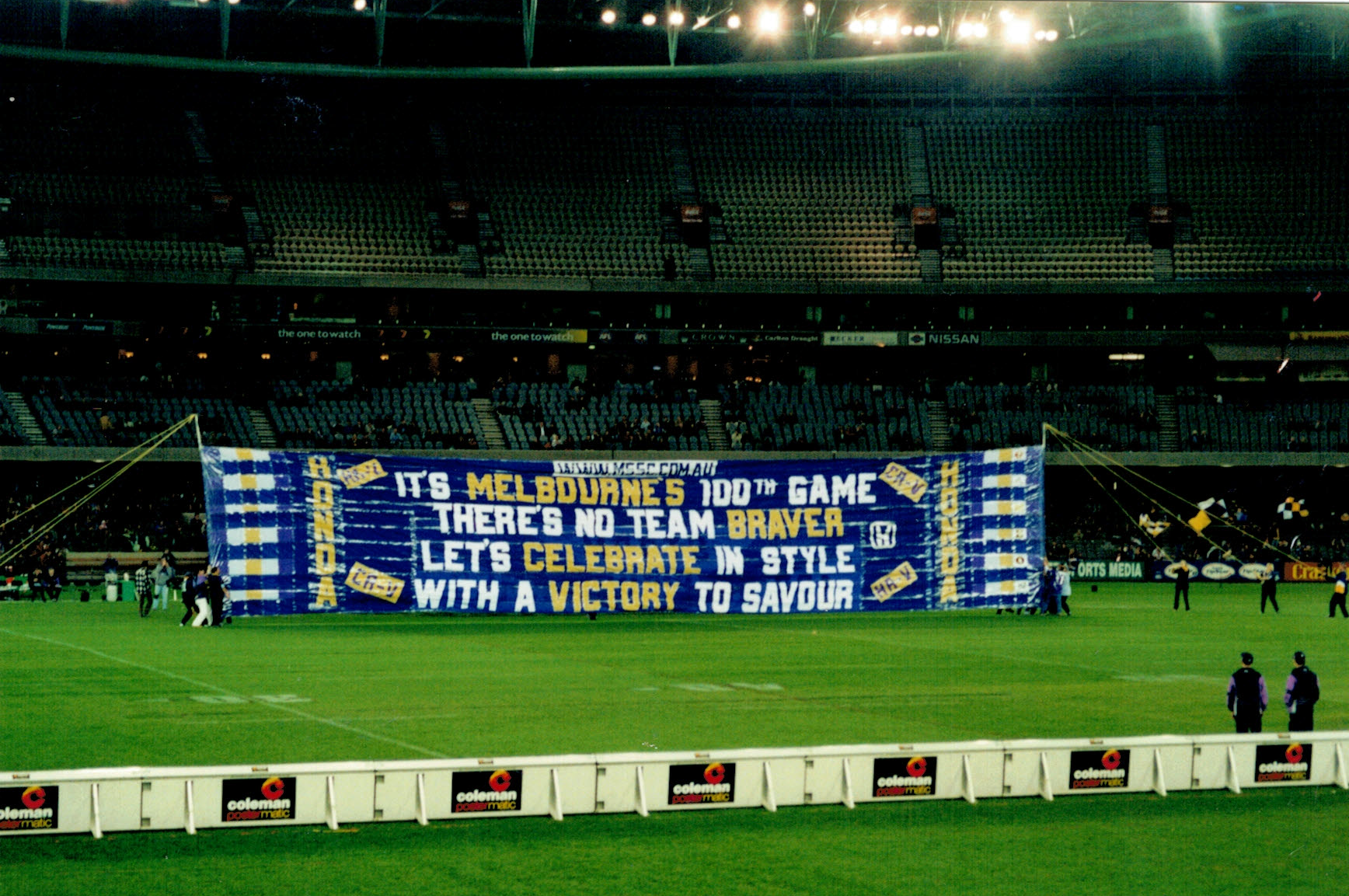
Inverse side of the Mebourne Storm 100th game banner

- Round 18 – Melbourne celebrate their 100th game of premiership football with a record-breaking 64–0 win over Wests Tigers at Colonial Stadium. The 64 points is Melbourne's greatest winning margin, and it was the first time holding the opposition to nil; while Matt Orford set a new club record with 10 goals in the match. Richard Swain becomes the first player to have played in 100 games for the club, featuring in every game played since 1998. The match was played on a Thursday night due to international rugby league rules ahead of a test match between Australia and New Zealand, after it was originally scheduled to be played on a Monday night due to availability issues at Colonial Stadium.
- 12 July – Penrith Panthers sign Storm forward Ben Roarty on a two-year contract from the 2002 NRL season.
- Round 19 – Melbourne lose their fourth straight match away at Marathon Stadiumto continue their winless run at the Knights home ground. The Storm conceded eight tries in the 48–16 loss against the Knights, losing Brett O'Farrell late in the match to an ankle injury in the defeat. O'Farrell was later ruled out for the rest of the season. Mark Murray saying that the team's "attitude to our defence was very poor and it got progressively worse as the game went on" also conceding that the Storm would not make the finals until they addressed their defence.
- 17 July – After announcing they were moving to the Cronulla Sharks ahead of the 2002 season, training staff Steve Litvensky (head trainer) Aaron Salisbury (strength and conditioning coach) immediately left the club with John Ribot denying that the pair were sacked, telling the media "they weren't sacked, they elected to leave. We're talking about a few weeks until the end of the season, so it's just a timing thing." Both staff members had been with the club since the club's inaugural season.
- Round 20 – Conceding a new club record of 54 points, Melbourne were thrashed by premiership fancy Parramatta Eels 54–10, with Jason Taylor equalling the Australian rugby league points scoring record of Daryl Halligan. Captain Robbie Kearns apologetic about the defeat saying it was the club's worst performance: "it was the worst because it was at home and I want to apologise to all the fans that came along and had to watch that. I feel like a real idiot after I said in the paper we had to win this one and then we go out and play like that. They just outmuscled us, outplayed us, outdid us in every part of the game and we've got to have a good look at ourselves. I hate to think what our missed-tackle count was."
- 28 July – Melbourne extend the contracts of Steve Bell and Peter Robinson — both players staying with the club for a further two seasons.
- Round 21 – The retractable seats at Colonial Stadium are brought in for the first time for a Storm match. It is rumoured that the costs to bring the seats in and replace damaged turf is in excess of A$100,000. In a comeback 32–28 win against the Brisbane Broncos, Marcus Bai scores his 50th try for the club, the first player to reach that milestone. Melbourne had fell behind 12–0 in the first half, and 28–14 down in the second half before mounting a comeback to keep their finals hopes alive.
- 1 August – In a wide-ranging interview, CEO Chris Johns declared that the club would not be moving to Queensland and that the move to Colonial Stadium was not a mistake, although it might have been a little "impetuous, a bit eager and we probably tried to run before we could walk." A few days later Gold Coast Mayor Gary Baildon said that he would contact the club after rumours persisted that the club could leave Victoria as early as 2003.
- 2 August – After rumours had linked him with a move, Brad Watts signed a two year deal to play with the South Sydney Rabbitohs when they rejoined the competition in 2002.
- Round 22 – Despite admitting his team "had no chance" to beat Melbourne, Peter Sharp sees his Northern Eagles team upset the Storm 20–12 in Gosford. Melbourne led 12–0 after 25 minutes, but failed to post any further points. Robbie Ross called the effort from the team "soft."
- 7 August – With speculation increasing, John Ribot said of the offer to relocate the club to the Gold Coast "I've got a lot of respect for Gary Baildon, but there is no way we'll be going to the Gold Coast. Why would we? We've got the best supporters in the world here and we're totally committed to Melbourne. Why would we want to go to the Gold Coast and play second fiddle to Brisbane?"
- Round 23 – Amid controversial calls by the officials, Melbourne fall to another heavy defeat, losing 50–28 against the Sydney Roosters. Melbourne were leading 28–22 before video referee Graeme West awarded a try to the Roosters in the 63rd minute, despite an apparent knock-on in the lead-up. The loss left the Storm outside the top eight in tenth position.
- Round 24 – Melbourne maintain slim hopes of a place in the top eight with a narrow 28–24 victory over last-placed Penrith in a Monday night match at Colonial Stadium. Robbie Ross scored two tries in the match, with the Storm coming from 24–18 down during the second half. Melbourne were missing Marcus Bai, Rodney Howe and Aaron Moule who were all injured, but did have late inclusions Scott Hill and Tasesa Lavea make important contributions. Lavea scoring the last try of the match with five minutes remaining.
- 23 August – Rodney Howe, who was thought to have an exit clause in his contract that was tied to former coach Chris Anderson, turned his back on offers on a big money move to Super League club Leeds Rhinos.
- Round 25 – A controversial 24–all draw with New Zealand Warriors seals the top eight door shut for Melbourne, meaning the club missed the NRL finals for the first time. Melbourne had fallen behind 22–4 at halftime, then scored 20 points in a stirring late comeback. Referee Tim Mander is admonished for directing Matt Geyer to take a conversion kick two metres closer to the sideline than from where the Storm's final try was scored. Mander had also sent Storm halfback to the sin bin for a professional foul with just over ten minutes remaining.
- 1 September – The club signed Wests Tigers prop forward Shane Walker on a one-year contract for the 2002 season.
- Round 26 – Richard Swain becomes the first player to make 1000 tackles in a NRL season, making a club record 52 tackles in Melbourne's final match of the season against the Canberra Raiders. Swain also completes the marathon achievement of being the only forward to have played every minute of every game throughout the season. Melbourne lose the final match of the season against the Canberra Raiders 32–6 with Mark Murray calling the Storm's perfmance "80 minutes of crap really and although we were out of the finals I think we were entitled to finish the season off a bit better than that." Defying a hamstring injury, Robbie Kearns played his 200th NRL match, setting up Melbourne's only try with an offload to Danny Williams.
- 6 September – The club advised Russell Bawden he would not be signed for the 2002 season, moving on from the forward who had played 101 matches with the club. Melbourne had signed both Mitchell Sargent and Willie Leyshon for the next season.
- 15 September – Danny Williams signs a one-year contract to stay in Melbourne. John Ribot reveals that he is confident that Melbourne would play a match in Shanghai, despite resistance from NRL CEO David Moffett.
- 21 October – On an end of season trip in Hawaii, Danny Williams and Ben Roarty are involved in a fist fight that leaves Roarty requiring 30 stitches under his eye. Roarty suffered a cracked orbital socket, with teammate Russell Bawden labelling Williams "an idiot."
- 20 November – Melbourne turn their back on Colonial Stadium, making the move back to Olympic Park for the 2002 season. The Storm had complained during the season that they were unable to train or practice at the ground and that the moveable seating setup had not been used as often as they had been promised. The move to the indoor stadium had not proven popular with fans, with Melbourne's average attendance significantly decreasing in 2001.

=== Milestone games ===
Round	Player	Milestone
Round 1	Junior Langi	Storm debut
Round 1	Matt Orford	Storm debut
Round 1	Steven Bell	NRL debut
Round 4	Paul Whatuira	Storm debut
Round 5	Richard Swain	100th game
Round 5	Henry Perenara	Storm debut
Round 11	Marcus Bai	100th game
Round 14	Paul Sheedy	NRL debut
Round 15	Scott Hill	100th game
Round 18	Melbourne Storm	100th game
Round 23	Russell Bawden	100th game
Round 24	Semi Tadulala	NRL debut
Round 26	Robbie Kearns	200th game

=== Jerseys ===
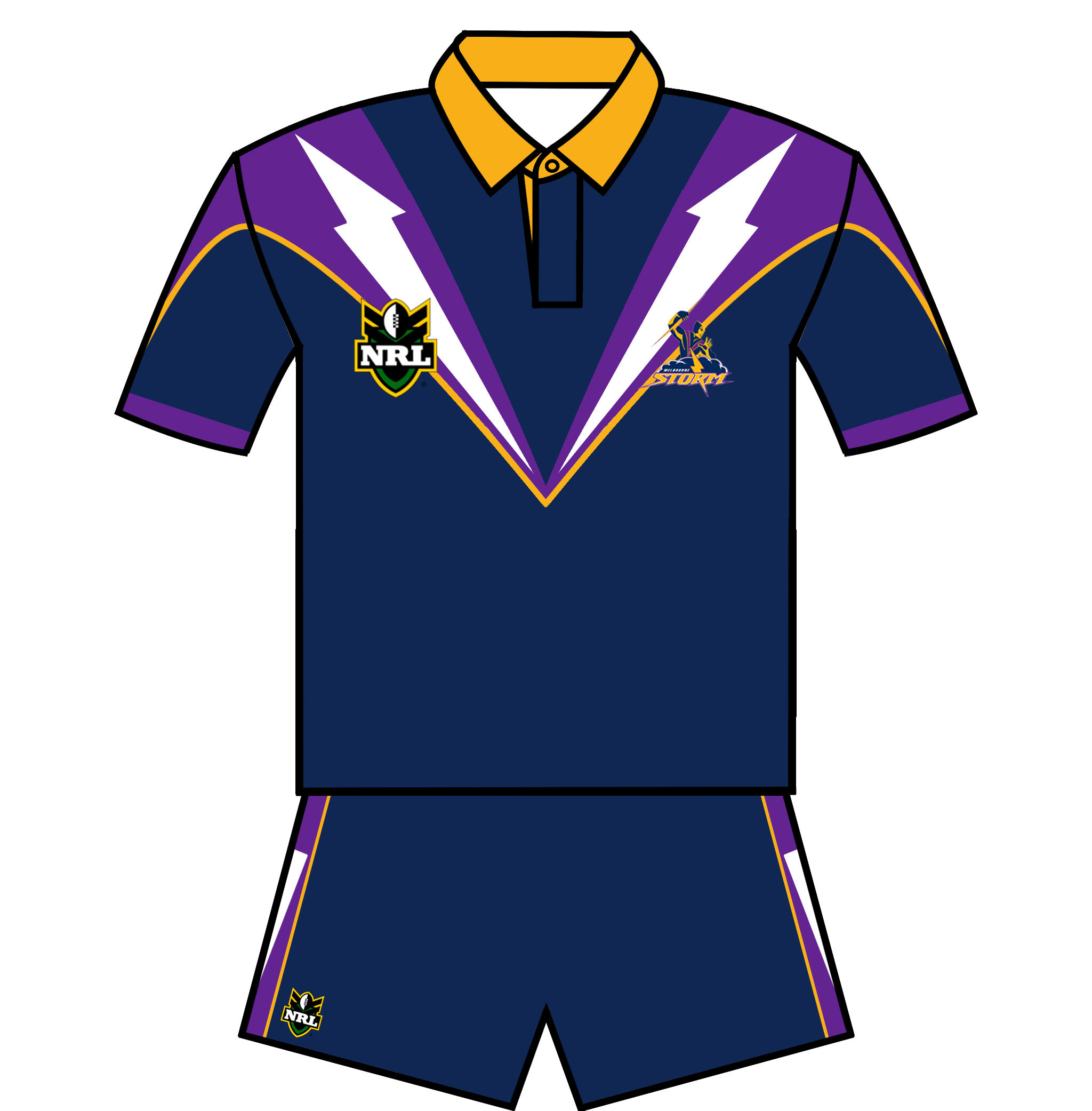
2001 home jersey

Melbourne's jerseys were again manufactured by Fila and carried the same design as the 1999-2000 home jersey. A new purple away jersey design with white and silver thunderbolts was worn in select games, with navy shorts and purple socks. For the first time, the jerseys displayed a front sponsor, with a white Adecco logo in a red box on the home jersey, with just the white logo on the purple away jersey.

== Fixtures ==
=== Pre Season ===
Date	Rd	Opponent	Venue	Result	Mel.	Opp.	Tries	Goals	Field goals	Ref
27 January	Trial	Penrith Panthers	Lavington Sports Ground, Albury	Won	40	18	B Roarty (2), B Martin, P Robinson, T Whatuira, M Bai, D Williams, B Watts	M Orford (3), T Lavea		
2 February	Trial	Northern Eagles	Brookvale Oval, Sydney	Lost	30	40	M Orford (2), B Roarty, J Langi, B Watts, R Ross	T Lavea (3)		

=== Regular season ===
==== Result by round ====
Round	1	2	3	4	5	6	7	8	9	10	11	12	13	14	15	16	17	18	19	20	21	22	23	24	25	26
Ground	H	H	A	H	A	H	A	A	H	H	A	A	H	A	A	H	A	H	A	H	H	A	A	H	H	A
Result	L	L	W	W	L	L	L	L	W	L	W	W	W	L	W	W	L	W	L	L	W	L	L	W	D	L
Position	10	13	11	6	11	13	12	13	12	12	10	9	7	9	7	6	8	7	8	8	8	9	10	10	9	9
Points	0	0	2	4	4	4	4	4	6	6	8	10	12	12	14	16	16	18	18	18	20	20	20	22	23	23

Source: Rugby League Tables
A = Away; H = Home; N = Neutral; B = Bye; W = Win; D = Draw; L = Loss

==== Matches ====
Date	Rd	Opponent	Venue	Result	Mel.	Opp.	Tries	Goals	Field goals	Ref
18 February	1	Canterbury-Bankstown Bulldogs	Colonial Stadium, Melbourne	Lost	10	14	M Bai	T Lavea 3/3		
24 February	2	North Queensland Cowboys	Colonial Stadium, Melbourne	Lost	28	32	B Roarty (2), M Bai, B Watts, D Williams	T Lavea 2/3, M Orford 2/3		
3 March	3	St George Illawarra Dragons	WIN Stadium, Wollongong	Won	20	16	B Watts (2), M Bai, M Orford	T Lavea 2/5		
11 March	4	Cronulla-Sutherland Sharks	Colonial Stadium, Melbourne	Won	34	24	M Geyer, S Hill, J Langi, M Orford, M Rua, P Whatuira	T Lavea 5/7		
18 March	5	Wests Tigers	Leichhardt Oval, Sydney	Lost	10	40	R Kearns, R Swain	T Lavea 1/2		
25 March	6	Newcastle Knights	Colonial Stadium, Melbourne	Lost	28	36	S Hill, A Moule, M Orford, R Ross, R Swain	T Lavea 3/4, M Geyer 1/1		
31 March	7	Parramatta Eels	Parramatta Stadium, Sydney	Lost	18	42	J Langi, A Moule, H Perenara	M Orford 3/3		
8 April	8	Brisbane Broncos	ANZ Stadium, Brisbane	Lost	16	18	M Bai, M Orford, H Perenara	M Orford 2/3		
13 April	9	Northern Eagles	Colonial Stadium, Melbourne	Won	52	18	A Moule (4), M Bai (2), R Bawden, S Hill, S Kearney	M Orford 8/10		
22 April	10	Sydney Roosters	Colonial Stadium, Melbourne	Lost	22	23	M Bai, M Orford, M Rua, P Whatuira	M Orford 3/5		
29 April	11	Penrith Panthers	Penrith Park, Sydney	Won	58	14	M Orford (2), D Williams (2), S Bell, M Geyer, S Hill, B Roarty, R Ross, M Rua, R Swain	M Orford 7/11		
12 May	12	New Zealand Warriors	Ericsson Stadium, Auckland	Won	40	20	A Moule (2), S Bell, S Hill, M Orford, R Ross, D Williams	M Orford 6/8		
19 May	13	Canberra Raiders	Colonial Stadium, Melbourne	Won	32	28	M Geyer (2), R Bawden, A Moule, P Robinson, R Ross	M Orford 4/7		
27 May	14	Canterbury-Bankstown Bulldogs	Sydney Showground, Sydney	Lost	28	26	M Bai, R Bawden, S Bell, M Geyer, P Robinson	M Orford 3/6		
2 June	15	North Queensland Cowboys	Dairy Farmers Stadium, Townsville	Won	24	38	S Bell (2), M Geyer (2), S Kearney, A Moule, H Perenara	M Orford 5/8		
17 June	16	St George Illawarra Dragons	Colonial Stadium, Melbourne	Won	34	28	M Bai, S Bell, M Geyer, S Hill, F Moala, H Perenara	M Orford 5/6		
23 June	17	Cronulla-Sutherland Sharks	Toyota Park, Sydney	Lost	18	40	S Bell, M Geyer, A Moule, M Orford	M Orford 1/4		
5 July	18	Wests Tigers	Colonial Stadium, Melbourne	Won	64	0	M Geyer (3), A Moule (2), R Howe, F Moala, M Orford, H Perenara, B Roarty, R Swain	M Orford 10/11		
15 July	19	Newcastle Knights	Marathon Stadium, Newcastle	Lost	16	48	M Bai, F Moala, M Orford	M Orford 2/4		
20 July	20	Parramatta Eels	Colonial Stadium, Melbourne	Lost	10	54	A Moule, M Orford	M Orford 1/2		
29 July	21	Brisbane Broncos	Colonial Stadium, Melbourne	Won	32	28	M Bai, S Bell, M Geyer, F Moala, M Orford, R Swain	M Orford 4/6		
4 August	22	Northern Eagles	NorthPower Stadium, Gosford	Lost	12	20	F Moala, M Orford	M Orford 2/4		
12 August	23	Sydney Roosters	Sydney Football Stadium, Sydney	Lost	28	50	S Kearney (2), S Bell, F Moala, P Robinson	M Orford 4/5		
20 August	24	Penrith Panthers	Colonial Stadium, Melbourne	Won	28	24	R Ross (2), R Bawden, S Bell, T Lavea	M Orford 4/6		
27 August	25	New Zealand Warriors	Colonial Stadium, Melbourne	Draw	24	24	S Bell, M Geyer, A Moule, M Orford, H Perenara	M Geyer 1/2, M Orford 1/3		
1 September	26	Canberra Raiders	Bruce Stadium, Canberra	Lost	6	32	D Williams	M Orford 1/1		

== Ladder ==
2001 NRL season
Pos	Team	Pld	W	D	L	PF	PA	PD	Pts
1	Parramatta Eels	26	20	2	4	839	406	+433	42
2	Canterbury-Bankstown Bulldogs	26	17	3	6	617	568	+49	37
3	Newcastle Knights (P)	26	16	1	9	782	639	+143	33
4	Cronulla-Sutherland Sharks	26	15	2	9	594	513	+81	32
5	Brisbane Broncos	26	14	1	11	696	511	+185	29
6	Sydney Roosters	26	13	1	12	647	589	+58	27
7	St. George Illawarra Dragons	26	12	2	12	661	573	+88	26
8	New Zealand Warriors	26	12	2	12	638	629	+9	26
9	Melbourne Storm	26	11	1	14	704	725	-21	23
10	Northern Eagles	26	11	1	14	603	750	-147	23
11	Canberra Raiders	26	9	1	16	600	623	-23	19
12	Wests Tigers	26	9	1	16	474	746	-272	19
13	North Queensland Cowboys	26	6	2	18	514	771	-257	14
14	Penrith Panthers	26	7	0	19	521	847	-326	14

== 2001 Coaching Staff ==
- Head coach: Chris Anderson until 2 April 2001
- Head coach: Mark Murray from 2 April 2001
- Assistant coach: Anthony Griffin
- Football Manager: Greg Brentnall
- Physiotherapist: Greg Gibson
- Head Trainer: Steve Litvensky until 17 July 2001
- Head Trainer: Troy Thompson from 17 July 2001
- Strength and conditioning Coach: Aaron Salisbury until 17 July 2001
- Strength and conditioning Coach: Dave Derbyshire from 17 July 2001

== 2001 Squad ==
List current as of 10 August 2021

Cap (Note: Players are listed with the cap number as they appear on the Melbourne Storm honour board. Additional squad members do not have a cap number.)	Nat.	Player name	Position	First Storm Game	Previous First Grade RL club (Note: This column denotes the previous RL club the player was signed to and played first grade RL for. If they are yet to debut then this is stipulated. If they were merely signed to the club but did not play then it is not counted.)
1	(Australia)	Robbie Ross	FB	1998	(Australia) Hunter Mariners
3	(Australia)	Aaron Moule	WG, CE	1998	(Australia) South Queensland Crushers
5	(Papua New Guinea)	Marcus Bai	WG	1998	(Australia) Gold Coast Chargers
6	(Australia)	Scott Hill	FE	1998	(Australia) Hunter Mariners
8	(Australia)	Rodney Howe	PR	1998	(Australia) Perth Reds
9	(Australia)	Danny Williams	LK, SR, HK	1998	(Australia) North Sydney Bears
10	(Australia)	Robbie Kearns	PR	1998	(Australia) Perth Reds
12	(Australia)	Ben Roarty	PR, SR, LK	1998	(Australia) Melbourne Storm
15	(New Zealand)	Richard Swain	HK	1998	(Australia) Hunter Mariners
16	(Australia)	Russell Bawden	PR	1998	(Australia) Brisbane Broncos
18	(Australia)	Matt Geyer	WG	1998	(Australia) Perth Reds
26	(New Zealand)	Matt Rua	PR, SR	1998	(Australia) Melbourne Storm
28	(New Zealand)	Stephen Kearney	SR	1999	(Australia) New Zealand Warriors
30	(New Zealand)	Tasesa Lavea	FE	1999	(Australia) Melbourne Storm
31	(Australia)	Brad Watts	FB	1999	(Australia) Melbourne Storm
32	(Australia)	Brett O'Farrell	PR	1999	(Australia) Melbourne Storm
34	(Tonga)	Fifita Moala	WG	2000	(Australia) Melbourne Storm
35	(Australia)	Brook Martin	WG	2000	(Australia) Melbourne Storm
37	(New Zealand)	Glen Turner	SR	2000	(Australia) Melbourne Storm
38	(Australia)	Peter Robinson	SR	2000	(Australia) Melbourne Storm
41	(Australia)	Brenton Pomery	PR	2000	(Australia) Wests Tigers
42	(New Zealand)	Junior Langi	CE	2001	(Australia) St George Illawarra Dragons
43	(Australia)	Matt Orford	HB	2001	(Australia) Northern Eagles
44	(Australia)	Steven Bell	CE	2001	(Australia) Melbourne Storm
45	(New Zealand)	Paul Whatuira	CE	2001	(New Zealand) Auckland Warriors
46	(New Zealand)	Henry Perenara	LK	2001	(New Zealand) Auckland Warriors
47	(Australia)	Paul Sheedy	FB	2001	(Australia) Melbourne Storm
48	(Fiji)	Semi Tadulala	WG	2001	(Australia) Melbourne Storm
—	(Australia)	Nic Henderson	SR	Yet to Debut	(Australia) Melbourne Storm
—	(New Zealand)	Tai Lavea	FB	Yet to Debut	(Australia) Melbourne Storm
—	(New Zealand)	Marty Turner	HB	Yet to Debut	(Australia) Melbourne Storm
—	(New Zealand)	Jason Wrigley	PR	Yet to Debut	(Australia) Melbourne Storm

== Player movements ==
Losses

- Kevin Carmichael to Norths Devils
- Chris Essex to Released
- Wayne Evans to Northern Eagles
- Wade Fenton to Released
- Brett Kimmorley to Northern Eagles
- John Lomax to Retirement
- Paul Marquet to Newcastle Knights
- Tony Martin to London Broncos

Gains

- Junior Langi from St George Illawarra Dragons
- Matt Orford from Northern Eagles
- Henry Perenara from Auckland Warriors
- Paul Whatuira from Auckland Warriors

== Team of the Century ==
In conjunction with the celebrations for Melbourne's 100th game in round 18 against Wests, Melbourne ran a "team of the century" promotion to honour the best 17 players over the first 100 games of the club's existence. The team was announced during half time of the round 21 game against Brisbane.

Melbourne Storm
Team of the Century	Interchange	Coach
1 Robbie Ross – FB; 2 Matt Geyer – WG; 3 Aaron Moule – CE; 4 Tony Martin – CE; 5 Marcus Bai – WG; 6 Scott Hill – FE; 7 Brett Kimmorley – HB; 8 Glenn Lazarus – PR; 9 Richard Swain – HK; 10 Rodney Howe – PR; 11 Robbie Kearns – SR; 12 Stephen Kearney – SR; 13 Tawera Nikau – LK	14 Paul Marquet; 15 Matt Rua; 16 Russell Bawden; 17 Danny Williams	Head coach: Chris Anderson; Legend: (c) Captain(s); (vc) Vice-captain(s); Updated: 14 September 2021; Source(s):

== Representative honours ==
This table lists all players who have played a representative match in 2001.

Player	City vs Country Origin	State of Origin 1	State of Origin 2	State of Origin 3	Midseason Tests (Note: Tests between Australia vs NZ, NZ vs France)	October Test (Note: Tests between Australia vs PNG)	2001 Kangaroo tour
Marcus Bai	—N/a	—N/a	—N/a	—N/a	—N/a	Papua New Guinea	—N/a
Russell Bawden	—N/a	—N/a	Queensland	—N/a	—N/a	—N/a	—N/a
Scott Hill	Country	—N/a	—N/a	—N/a	—N/a	—N/a	—N/a
Rodney Howe	—N/a	New South Wales	—N/a	—N/a	—N/a	—N/a	—N/a
Stephen Kearney	—N/a	—N/a	—N/a	—N/a	New Zealand	—N/a	—N/a
Robbie Kearns	—N/a	New South Wales	—N/a	—N/a	Australia	Australia	Australia
Tasesa Lavea	—N/a	—N/a	—N/a	—N/a	New Zealand	—N/a	—N/a
Matt Orford	City	—N/a	—N/a	—N/a	—N/a	—N/a	—N/a
Henry Perenara	—N/a	—N/a	—N/a	—N/a	New Zealand	—N/a	—N/a
Matt Rua	—N/a	—N/a	—N/a	—N/a	New Zealand	—N/a	—N/a
Richard Swain	—N/a	—N/a	—N/a	—N/a	New Zealand	—N/a	—N/a

== Statistics ==
This table contains playing statistics for all Melbourne Storm players to have played in the 2001 NRL season.

- Statistics sources:

Name	Appearances	Tries	Goals	Field goals	Points
Marcus Bai	21	11	0	0	44
Russell Bawden	23	4	0	0	16
Steven Bell	20	11	0	0	44
Matt Geyer	26	14	2	0	60
Scott Hill	20	6	0	0	24
Rodney Howe	17	1	0	0	4
Stephen Kearney	26	4	0	0	16
Robbie Kearns	23	1	0	0	4
Junior Langi	10	2	0	0	8
Tasesa Lavea	19	1	16	0	36
Fifita Moala	10	6	0	0	24
Aaron Moule	21	15	0	0	60
Brett O'Farrell	9	0	0	0	0
Matt Orford	26	15	78	0	216
Henry Perenara	21	6	0	0	24
Brenton Pomery	2	0	0	0	0
Ben Roarty	23	4	0	0	16
Peter Robinson	20	3	0	0	12
Robbie Ross	14	6	0	0	24
Matt Rua	25	3	0	0	12
Paul Sheedy	2	0	0	0	0
Richard Swain	26	5	0	0	20
Semi Tadulala	1	0	0	0	0
Brad Watts	7	3	0	0	12
Paul Whatuira	6	2	0	0	8
Danny Williams	21	5	0	0	20
26 players used	—	128	96	0	704

=== Scorers ===
Most points in a game: 24 points

- Round 18 - Matt Orford (1 try, 10 Goals) vs Wests Tigers

Most tries in a game: 4 (Note: Equal club record)

- Round 9 - Aaron Moule vs Northern Eagles

=== Winning games ===
Highest score in a winning game: 64 points

- Round 18 vs Wests Tigers

Lowest score in a winning game: 20 points

- Round 3 vs St George Illawarra Dragons

Greatest winning margin: 64 points (Note: New club record)

- Round 18 vs Wests Tigers

Greatest number of games won consecutively: 3

- Round 11 - Round 13

=== Losing games ===
Highest score in a losing game: 28 points

- Round 2 vs North Queensland Cowboys
- Round 6 vs Newcastle Knights
- Round 23 vs Sydney Roosters

Lowest score in a losing game: 6 points

- Round 26 vs Canberra Raiders

Greatest losing margin: 44 points

- Round 20 vs Parramatta Eels

Greatest number of games lost consecutively: 4

- Round 5 - Round 8

=== NRL Judiciary ===
A number of Melbourne players were cited by the match review committee for incidents through the 2001 season, with the following results from the NRL Judiciary.

Round	Player	Offence & grade	Result (Note: 100 demerit points equals one match suspension.)	Ref
Round 1	Rodney Howe	Reckless high tackle (Grade 3)	6 matches (633 demerit points)	
Round 3	Aaron Moule	Careless high tackle (Grade 4)	1 match (168 demerit points)	
Round 4	Richard Swain	Careless high tackle (Grade 2)	No matches (93 demerit points)	
Round 20	Ben Roarty	Careless high tackle (Grade 1)	No matches (56 demerit points)	
Round 25	Rodney Howe	Careless high tackle (Grade 1)	1 match (145 demerit points)	
Round 26	Tasesa Lavea	Careless high tackle (Grade 1)	No matches (56 demerit points)	

== Feeder Team ==
Melbourne Storm reserve players again travelled to Brisbane each week to play with Queensland Cup team Norths Devils. Making the finals for the fourth straight season, Norths Devils finished fourth, but were eliminated in the first week of the 2001 Queensland Cup finals.

Before the start of the season, Melbourne had provided additional funding to Norths in order to guarantee the club's survival for at least two seasons. That support including payments of A$125,000 and waiving debts of A$65,000.

Following Mark Murray's appointment as caretaker coach to the Storm, the club poached Terry Matterson to takeover as coach of the Devils, Matterson leaving the Toowoomba Clydesdales to take the role.

2001 Queensland Cup
Pos	Team	Pld	W	D	L	B	PF	PA	PD	Pts
4	Norths Devils	20	11	3	6	2	558	446	+112	29

== Awards and honours ==
=== Melbourne Storm Awards Night ===
Held at Crown Palladium on Monday, 1 October:

- Melbourne Storm Player of the Year: Richard Swain
- Melbourne Storm Members' Player of the Year: Matt Orford
- Melbourne Storm Rookie of the Year: Steven Bell
- Melbourne Storm Clubman of the Year: Stephen Kearney
- Mick Moore Chairman's Award: Richard Swain
- Hit of the Year: Matt Rua (round 3)

=== Other Awards ===
- The Weakest Link Sports Special Winner; Rodney Howe.
