= Tevita Metuisela =

Australian rugby footballer

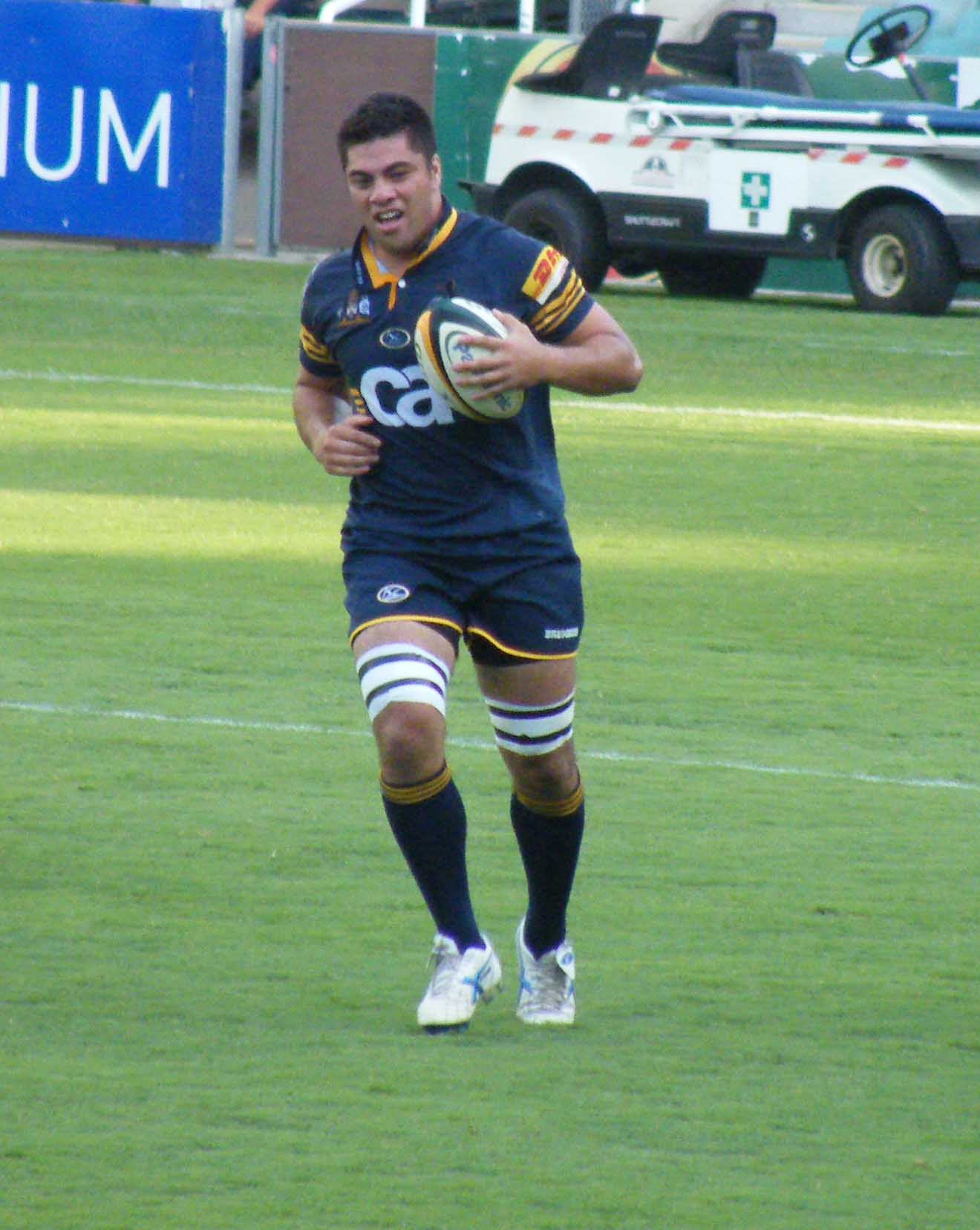

Personal information
- Full name: Tevita Metuisela
- Born: 16 October 1983 (age 43) Manly, New South Wales, Australia
- Height: 187 cm (6 ft 2 in)
- Weight: 103 kg (16 st 3 lb)

Playing information

Rugby league
- Position: Prop, Second-row
Club
| Years | Team | Pld | T | G | FG | P |
|---|---|---|---|---|---|---|
| 2003 | Sydney Roosters | 2 | 0 | 0 | 0 | 0 |
| 2005 | Melbourne Storm | 3 | 0 | 0 | 0 | 0 |
| 2006–08 | Wests Tigers | 4 | 0 | 0 | 0 | 0 |
| | Total | 9 | 0 | 0 | 0 | 0 |
Representative
| Years | Team | Pld | T | G | FG | P |
| 2005 | Tonga | 1 | 0 | 0 | 0 | 0 |
| 2006 | NSW Residents | 1 | 1 | 0 | 0 | 4 |

Rugby union
- Position: Back row
Club
| Years | Team | Pld | T | G | FG | P |
|---|---|---|---|---|---|---|
| 2011 | Western Force | 7 | 0 | 0 | 0 | 0 |
| 2012 | NSW Waratahs | 2 | 0 | 0 | 0 | 0 |
| | Total | 9 | 0 | 0 | 0 | 0 |
- Source: As of 8 January 2024

Tevita Metuisela (born 16 October 1983) is an Australian professional rugby union and rugby league footballer.

== Rugby League ==
In rugby league Metuisela played as a prop or second row forward, and appeared for the Sydney Roosters, Melbourne Storm and Wests Tigers teams. He was named in the Tonga training squad for the 2008 Rugby League World Cup.

== Rugby Union ==
In 2009 Metuisela made the switch to rugby union where he plays as a back row forward, either flanker or Number Eight. He was a part of the ACT Brumbies Academy and has also played for the Manly club in Sydney. Metuisela played Super Rugby for the Western Force in 2011. He played for the Waratahs in 2012.
