= Jason Wrigley =

New Zealand rugby league player

Personal information
- Born: 30 April 1980 (age 45); Wellington, New Zealand

Playing information
Club
Years	Team	Pld	T	G	FG	P
2004	Penrith Panthers	2	0	0	0	0

Jason Wrigley (born 30 April 1980) is a former New Zealand-born professional rugby league player. During the 2004 NRL season, he made two appearances off the bench for the Penrith Panthers.

Born in Wellington, as of 2017, Wrigley is a member of the coaching staff of the Panthers, serving as the side's football manager.
