= Peter Robinson (rugby league) =

Australian rugby league footballer and commentator

Personal information
- Full name: Peter Robinson
- Born: 5 January 1976 (age 50) Parramatta, New South Wales, Australia

Playing information
- Height: 185 cm (6 ft 1 in)
- Weight: 102 kg (16 st 1 lb)
- Position: Second-row, Prop
Club
Years	Team	Pld	T	G	FG	P
2000–05	Melbourne Storm	75	10	0	0	40

Peter Robinson (born 5 January 1976), is an Australian former professional rugby league footballer who played in the 2000s. He played for the Melbourne Storm from 2000 to 2005. Robinson is also a rugby league commentator for the ABC.

== Early life ==
Robinson played junior rugby league for Cobar Roosters, winning premierships and individual honours in both junior and senior football for the Roosters, who were then playing in the Group 11 Rugby League competition.

== Playing career ==
Moving to Brisbane in 1999, Robinson played with Norths Devils and made his National Rugby League debut for Melbourne Storm during the 2000 NRL season. With regular players absent through representative duties, Robinson scored a last-second try against Brisbane Broncos in round 16, going on to make six appearances for Melbourne in 2000.

Establishing himself as a regular first grade player during the 2001 Melbourne Storm season, Robinson went on to make 75 appearances for Melbourne, before retiring at the end of the 2005 NRL season.

== Post-playing career ==
Robinson later joined the club administration in a player welfare and development role, and has continued in that role for many years.
