= Dustin Cooper =

Australian rugby footballer & coach

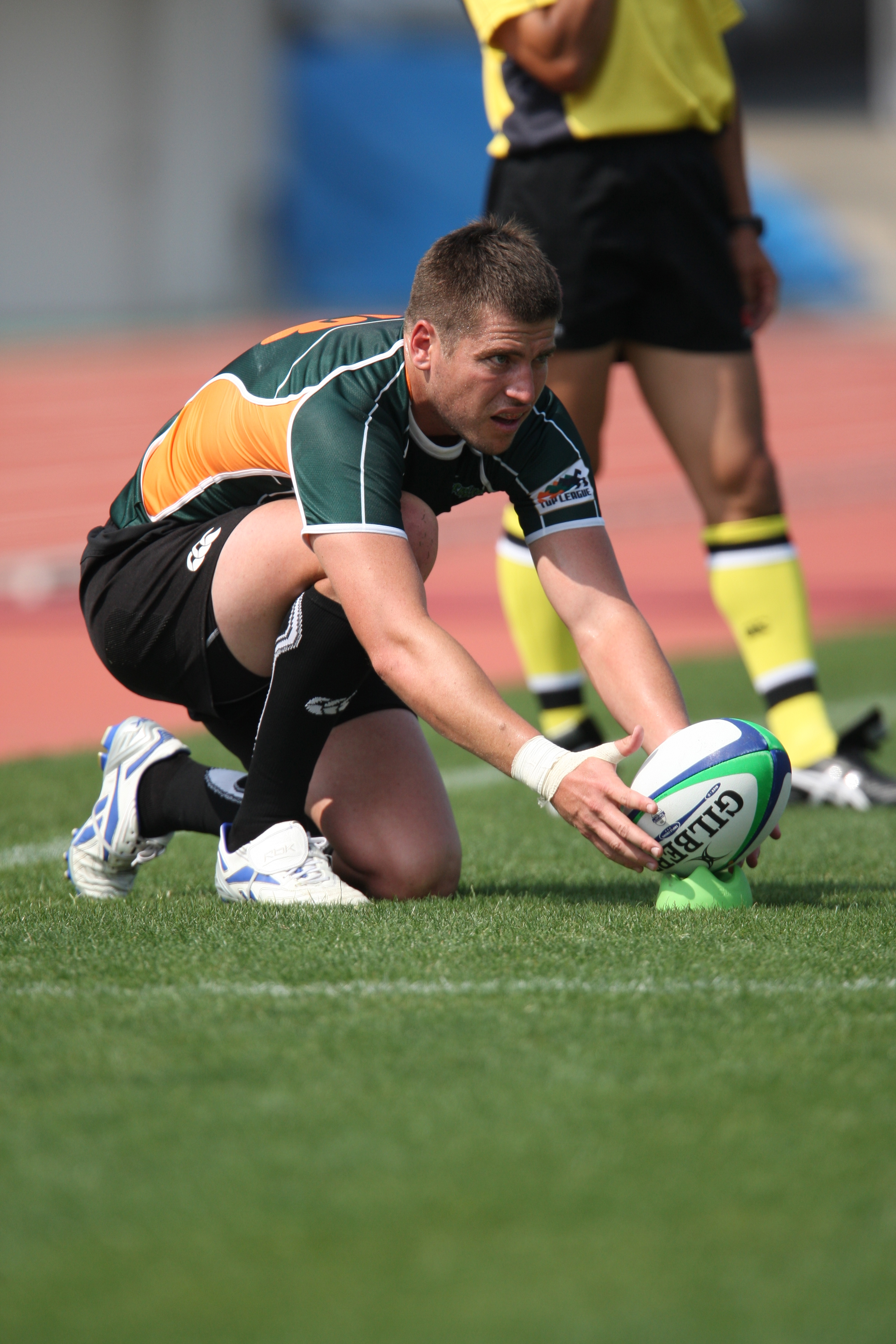

Personal information
- Full name: Dustin Wade Cooper
- Born: 8 May 1981 (age 45) Murgon, Queensland, Australia

Playing information
- Height: 193 cm (6 ft 4 in)
- Weight: 102 kg (16 st 1 lb)

Rugby league
- Position: Wing, Centre, Fullback, Second-row
Club
Years	Team	Pld	T	G	FG	P
2003–04	Melbourne Storm	17	9	2	0	40
2005–06	Newcastle Knights	14	3	0	0	12
2007–08	Cronulla Sharks	6	0	0	0	0
2011–12	Pia Donkeys	10	2	0		8
2012–15	Boston Thirteens	11	1	8		20
2014	Lézignan Sangliers	3	1	5		20
	Total	61	16	15	0	100

Rugby union
Club
Years	Team	Pld	T	G	FG	P
2009–11	Toyota Verblitz	14	7	7	0	49

Coaching information
Representative
Years	Team	Gms	W	D	L	W%
2016–17	United States	1	1	0	0	100

Dustin Cooper (born 8 May 1981) is an Australian former professional rugby league footballer who last played for Lézignan Sangliers in the French Elite One Championship, the Boston 13s in the USA Rugby League. He returned to league after a two-year stint in rugby union with Toyota Verblitz in the Japan Top League.

== Early life ==
Cooper was educated at Murgon State High School. He played junior rugby league for Murgon Mustangs, before moving to Brisbane. Before joining the Melbourne Storm, Cooper played with Redcliffe Dolphins in the Brisbane Rugby League A-Grade competition, ending the 2002 season as the leading points scorer.

== Rugby League career ==
Cooper made his debut in the NRL with the Melbourne Storm where he played the 2003 and 2004 seasons on the wing. He then moved to Newcastle Knights in 2005-2006, starting as a fullback but eventually filling the utility role.

In 2005, Cooper was one of 11 players fined by Newcastle for misconduct after a pre-season game in Bathurst.

It was alleged that some of the Newcastle players had broken curfew to visit dormitories at Charles Sturt University. It was reported that one of the players had jumped on a student as she slept in her bed and touched her inappropriately. One of the Newcastle players Dane Tilse was deregistered by the NRL for 12 months. Cooper played 14 games for Newcastle in the 2005 NRL season as the club finished last on the table.

In 2007 and 2008, Cooper played with Cronulla-Sutherland Sharks in the second row, finishing his NRL career at the end of the 2008 NRL season. He returned to league in 2011 with the Pia Donkeys, where he played in the second row. In 2012, Cooper began playing five-eighth for the Boston Thirteens in the USARL and helped them to win a national championship in 2015.

== Rugby Union career ==
Cooper played as a centre/winger for Toyota Verblitz 2009-2011, in the Japan Top League, and was selected in the Japan Top League All Stars match 2011. He is also an inaugural member of the Asia Pacific Barbarians, participating in the annual Hong Kong rugby tens tournament in 2011.
