= Fifita Moala =

Tonga international rugby league footballer

Personal information
- Full name: Fifita Moala
- Born: 30 August 1980 (age 46) Tonga

Playing information
- Height: 180 cm (5 ft 11 in)
- Weight: 85 kg (13 st 5 lb)
- Position: Wing
Club
Years	Team	Pld	T	G	FG	P
2000–04	Melbourne Storm	39	20	0	0	80
Representative
Years	Team	Pld	T	G	FG	P
2000	Tonga	3	3	9	0	30

Fifita Moala (born 30 August 1980), is a Tongan former professional rugby league footballer who played in the 2000s. He played for the Melbourne Storm from 2000-04. In 2000, Moala played for the Tonga national rugby league team in the 2000 Rugby League World Cup.

== Playing career ==
Moala never played junior rugby league, instead playing rugby union at school in Auckland with Kelstrom Boys. Moving to Brisbane, he played with Norths Devils and was a member of Norths' 1998 Queensland Cup Colts Grand Final winning team.

In 2000, Moala made his National Rugby League debut for Melbourne Storm in round 13. He made 10 appearances for Melbourne for the 2000 NRL season and was selected to represent Tonga in the 2000 Rugby League World Cup. His international career was curtailed by a serious knee injury sustained during that tournament, which led to Moala missing much of the 2001 Melbourne Storm season.

Moala suffered a second serious knee injury in late 2002, but regained his place in the Melbourne Storm side during the 2003 NRL season. His last NRL game was in round 2 of the 2004 Melbourne Storm season.
