= Robert Tanielu =

New Zealand rugby league footballer

Personal information
- Born: 9 June 1982 (age 44) Christchurch, New Zealand

Playing information
- Height: 197 cm (6 ft 6 in)
- Weight: 114 kg (17 st 13 lb)
- Position: Prop
Club
Years	Team	Pld	T	G	FG	P
2002	Brisbane Broncos	1	1	0	0	4
2003–04	Melbourne Storm	5	0	0	0	0
2006	North Qld Cowboys	3	0	0	0	0
	Total	9	1	0	0	4
Representative
Years	Team	Pld	T	G	FG	P
2005	Queensland Residents	1	0	0	0	0

Robert Tanielu (born 19 June 1982) is a New Zealand former professional rugby league footballer. He previously played with the Brisbane Broncos, Melbourne Storm and North Queensland Cowboys. He retired in January 2007 following medical advice after sustaining his second serious neck injury.

== Background ==
Robert Tanielu was born in Christchurch, New Zealand. As a teenager, he played both rugby league and rugby union at Aranui High School.

A prop forward, he was a Sydenham Swans junior in the Canterbury Rugby League and represented the Junior Kiwis in 2001. Moving to Queensland to play for Wests Panthers in the Queensland Cup in 2001, he represented Queensland under-19s in their match against New South Wales.

== Rugby league career ==
Tanielu was signed by the Brisbane Broncos on a one-year contract ahead of the 2002 NRL season. At 19-years-old he made his NRL debut for Brisbane in round 12 of the 2002 NRL season, scoring the first try of the match in a 28–14 win for the "Baby Broncos" against the Wests Tigers. That was Tanielu's only NRL match of the season as he played out the season for Brisbane's feeder club Toowoomba Clydesdales in the Queensland Cup competition. During the season he represented both Queensland Country and Queensland Residents.

Chased by both the North Queensland Cowboys and Melbourne Storm, Tanielu signed with the Storm ahead of the 2003 season, confirming a two-year deal to move to Melbourne. Before he could join the Storm, Tanielu suffered a serious neck injury playing for Toowoomba, when he was dropped onto his head in a tackle. That injury looked to have sidelined Tanielu for most of the 2003 season, after he underwent surgery on a bulging disc in his neck, with doctors also finding that he had suffered spinal cord damage. Tanielu later told the media about the tackle that caused his injury, saying that he "lost a bit of sensation for about five minutes, which was a bit scary," with his manager Jim Banaghan adding that "his orthopedic surgeon in Sydney told me Robert would be very lucky to ever play football again. The neurosurgeon in Melbourne told me that he was only 1mm from disaster -- if the bones had slipped just that much more on to his spinal column, he would have been a paraplegic. He only needed a millimetre of a miracle to play again. That was what he got."

Tanielu eventually made his first NRL appearance for Melbourne in round 12 of the 2003 NRL season after being cleared to play rugby league in May. His second NRL appearance coming a full year after his debut in 2002. Tanielu's return only lasted nine minutes after he suffered a concussion in that match, with fears he might have suffered another neck injury. He would make one further NRL appearance for Melbourne during the 2003 season.

In 2004, Tanielu would make a number of appearances for Storm feeder club Norths Devils in the Queensland Cup, as he was limited to just three NRL appearances with the forward often named as a reserve.

While playing for Norths Devils, he would again represent the Queensland Residents in their match against New South Wales Residents in 2005. Unable to break into the Storm squad during the 2005 season, Tanielu signed with the North Queensland Cowboys for the 2006 and 2007 seasons.

Starting the 2006 season with North Queensland Young Guns, Tanielu eventually made his Cowboys debut in round 10 against the Melbourne Storm, his first NRL appearance since 2004. That match was one of just three NRL appearances for Tanielu for the season, after he again suffered a serious neck injury against the Brisbane Broncos in round 20. Tanielu was rushed to Townsville Hospital after a collision with Scott Minto left him sprawling on the field. Tanielu was reported to have no feeling in his arms or legs following the incident just after half time, with doctors fearing he had suffered a serious spinal injury.

Following that incident, Tanielu was urged to retire from rugby league even as he was told he would make a full recovery. Speaking from hospital, Tanielu reflected on the injury saying "It (retirement) hasn't entered my mind. I am just staying really positive and waiting to get my neck right. I'll see where I go from there. It was pretty scary at the time. But the last couple of days it's just been getting better and better. I'm making a good recovery. No-one from the club has spoken about retirement. All the club is worried about is making sure I'm healthy and my family is looked after."

Tanielu would undergo light rehabilitation therapy in the weeks following his release from hospital, and returned to Cowboys training following the end of the 2006 season, but medical advice in January 2007 forced his retirement from the sport.

At his retirement press conference, Tanielu said that:

"I had a lot more dreams for rugby league but I'm proud and lucky to have accomplished what I have. This has been the hardest decision I've had to make but ultimately my family and health are what's more important in my life. The doctors and specialists pretty much said I'd be at a higher risk than every other NRL player because the injury that occurred has happened to me twice. They sort of said if I continued to play I'd be like a ticking time bomb. It wasn't 'if' it was 'when', one knock and I could have been paralysed and ended up in a wheelchair."

— Robert Tanielu, 2007

Tanielu would later coach junior rugby league teams at both Aspley and the Norths Devils, and was part of the Devils coaching panel that won the 2022 Queensland Cup grand final. He would later transfer to the Redcliffe Dolphins, also acting as an assistant coach of the Samoa women's national rugby league team in the lead-up to the 2026 Rugby League World Cup.
