= List of Penrith Panthers records =

The Penrith Panthers were officially introduced to the New South Wales Rugby League (NSWRL – now known as NRL) – the premier Rugby League competition in Australia – in 1967. They have had an eventful history, winning four wooden spoons and six premierships (finishing runners-up twice). The following are club match records:

== Team ==
=== Biggest wins ===
| Margin | Score | Opponent | Venue | Date |
|---|---|---|---|---|
| 68 | 68-0 | West Tigers | Commbank Stadium | 7 June 2026 |
| 60 | 72–12 | Manly-Warringah Sea Eagles | Penrith Football Stadium | 7 August 2004 |
| 56 | 62–6 | New Zealand Warriors | Penrith Football Stadium | 18 May 2013 |

Biggest losses

| Margin | Score | Opponent | Venue | Date |
|---|---|---|---|---|
| 62 | 12–74 | Canberra Raiders | Canberra Stadium | 10 August 2008 |
| 59 | 7–70 | Manly-Warringah Sea Eagles | Penrith Park | 29 July 1973 |
| 58 | 6–64 | Parramatta Eels | Parramatta Stadium | 17 March 2002 |
| 54 | 5–59 | South Sydney Rabbitohs | Penrith Park | 11 May 1980 |

=== Longest winning streaks ===
- 17 games: 19 June – 17 October 2020
- 12 games: 13 March – 29 May 2021
- 11 games: 18 September 2021 – 29 April 2022
- 10 games: 1 June 2025 - 8 August 2025
- 8 games: 19 April – 7 June 2003

=== Longest losing streaks ===
- 12 games: 1 June – 24 August 1980
- 10 games: 23 April – 2 July 1972

=== Longest winning home streak ===
Penrith Panthers

| Wins | First win | Last win |
|---|---|---|
| 21 | Round 19, 2019 | Round 7, 2022 |

=== Longest winning away streak ===
Penrith Panthers

| Wins | First win | Last win |
|---|---|---|
| 14 | Round 8, 2020 | Round 11, 2021 |

=== Biggest comebacks ===
Recovered from a 23-point deficit

- Trailed Wests Tigers 31–8 after 57 minutes to win 32–31 at Penrith Football Stadium (4 June 2000).

Recovered from a 22-point deficit

- Trailed New Zealand Warriors 28–6 after 46 minutes to win 36–28 at Pepper Stadium (13 May 2017).

Recovered from a 18-point deficit

- Trailed Manly-Warringah Sea Eagles 24–6 after 67 minutes to win 28–24 at Brookvale Oval (28 July 2018).

Recovered from a 8-point deficit with 2 minutes remaining

- Trailed Canberra Raiders 12–20 with only 2 minutes remaining to win 24–20 at Carrington Park (10 June 2017).

Partially recovered from a 26-point deficit

- Trailed New Zealand Warriors 32–6 at halftime to draw 32–32 at CUA Stadium (2009).

Recovered from a 16-point deficit In 2023 Grand Final

Trailed Brisbane Broncos 24–8 after 60 minutes in the 2023 Grand Final, with Isaah Yeo off for a HIA and Jerome Luai sidelined by a shoulder injury, before Nathan Cleary led Penrith to a 26–24 victory at Accor Stadium (1 October 2023).

Recovered from a 14-point deficit

In his return from injury, Nathan Cleary led Penrith from 26–12 down after 60 minutes to a 28–26 golden point win over the Dolphins, sealing victory with a 43-metre field goal at BlueBet Stadium (21 July 2024).

=== Worst collapse ===
Surrendered a 26-point lead.

- Led North Queensland Cowboys 26–0 at halftime to lose 36–28 at Penrith Football Stadium (29 May 1998) ^.

^ denotes premiership record.

== Coaches ==
There have been 19 coaches of the Panthers since their first season in 1967. The current coach is Ivan Cleary.

| No | Name | Seasons | Games | Wins | Draws | Losses | Win % | Premiers | Runners-up | Minor premiers | Wooden spoons | Notes |
|---|---|---|---|---|---|---|---|---|---|---|---|---|
| 1 | Leo Trevena | 1967, 1973 | 44 | 10 | 2 | 32 | 22.7 | — | — | — | 1973 | — |
| 2 | Bob Boland | 1968–1972 | 110 | 39 | 3 | 68 | 35.5 | — | — | — | — | — |
| 3 | Jack Clare | 1974 | 22 | 9 | 0 | 13 | 40.9 | — | — | — | — | — |
| 4 | Mike Stephenson | 1975 | 16 | 6 | 0 | 10 | 37.5 | — | — | — | — | As captain-coach |
| 5 | Barry Harris | 1975–76 | 28 | 9 | 2 | 17 | 32.1 | — | — | — | — | — |
| 6 | Don Parish | 1977–78 | 44 | 10 | 3 | 31 | 22.7 | — | — | — | — | — |
| 7 | Len Stacker | 1979–81 | 66 | 16 | 3 | 47 | 24.2 | — | — | — | 1980 | — |
| 8 | John Peard | 1982–83 | 52 | 16 | 1 | 35 | 30.8 | — | — | — | — | — |
| 9 | Tim Sheens | 1984–87 | 98 | 43 | 4 | 51 | 43.9 | — | — | — | — | Club's first finals appearance in 1985 |
| 10 | Ron Willey | 1988–89 | 47 | 31 | 0 | 16 | 66.0 | — | — | — | — | — |
| 11 | Phil Gould | 1990–94 | 109 | 61 | 4 | 44 | 56.0 | 1991 | 1990 | 1991 | — | — |
| 12 | Graham Rogers | 1992 | 1 | 0 | 0 | 1 | 0.0 | — | — | — | — | Caretaker coach |
| 13 | Royce Simmons | 1994–2001 | 177 | 76 | 4 | 97 | 42.9 | — | — | — | 2001 | — |
| 14 | John Lang | 2002–06 | 125 | 65 | 0 | 60 | 52.0 | 2003 | — | 2003 | — | — |
| 15 | Matthew Elliott | 2007–11 | 111 | 49 | 2 | 60 | 44.1 | — | — | — | 2007 | Sacked mid-season 2011 |
| 16 | Steve Georgallis | 2011 | 11 | 4 | 0 | 7 | 36.4 | — | — | — | — | Caretaker coach |
| 17 | Ivan Cleary | 2012–15, 2019–present | 210 | 128 | 1 | 81 | 61.0 | 2021, 2022, 2023, 2024 | 2020 | 2020, 2022, 2023 | - | Incumbent |
| 18 | Anthony Griffin | 2016–2018 | 72 | 42 | 0 | 30 | 58.3 | — | — | — | — | Contract terminated 6 August 2018 |
| 19 | Cameron Ciraldo | 2018 | 6 | 3 | 0 | 3 | 50.0 | — | — | — | — | Caretaker coach |

== Individual ==
=== Most games for club ===
- 283, Isaah Yeo (2014–present)
- 243, Steve Carter (1988–2001)
- 238, Craig Gower (1996–2007)
- 238, Royce Simmons (1980–1991)
- 228, Greg Alexander (1984–1994, 1997–1999)
- 217, Moses Leota (2016-present)
- 211, Tony Puletua (1997–2008)
- 208, Luke Lewis (2001–2012)
- 206, Nathan Cleary (2016-present)
- 206, Brad Izzard (1982–1992)

=== Most tries for club ===
- 113, Rhys Wesser (1998–2008)
- 102, Brian To'o (2019-present)
- 101, Ryan Girdler (1993–2004)
- 101, Greg Alexander (1984–1994, 1997–1999)
- 89, Luke Lewis (2001–2012)
- 74, Josh Mansour (2012–2020)
- 73, Brad Izzard (1982–1992)
- 71, Michael Jennings (2007–2012)
- 66, Robbie Beckett (1994–2001)
- 65, Steve Carter (1988–2001)

=== Most points for club ===
- 1,914 (73 tries, 800 goals, 18 field goals), Nathan Cleary (2016–present)
- 1,572 (101 tries, 582 goals, 6 field goals), Ryan Girdler (1993–2004)
- 1,104 (101 tries, 343 goals, 14 field goals), Greg Alexander (1984–1994, 1997–1999)
- 798 (55 tries, 289 goals), Michael Gordon (2006–2012)
- 613 (43 tries, 220 goals, 1 field goal), Preston Campbell (2003–2006)
- 454 (113 tries, 1 goal), Rhys Wesser (1998–2008)

=== Most points in a season ===
- 270 by Michael Gordon in 2010
- 231 by Nathan Cleary in 2021
- 229 by Ryan Girdler in 1999

=== Most tries in a season ===
- 28 by Thomas Jenkins in 2026
- 25 by Rhys Wesser in 2003
- 23 by Amos Roberts in 2004
- 21 by Brian To'o in 2023
- 19 by Rhys Wesser in 2006

=== Most points in a match ===
- 34 by Nathan Cleary in Round 25 of the 2019 NRL season

== State of Origin Representatives ==
=== New South Wales ===
- Brad Izzard (1982, 1991)
- Royce Simmons (1984, 1986, 1987, 1888)
- Greg Alexander (1989, 1990, 1991)
- John Cartwright (1989, 1991, 1992)
- Mark Geyer (1989, 1991)
- Chris Mortimer (1989)
- Peter Kelly (1989)
- Brad Fittler (1990, 1991, 1992, 1993, 1994, 1995)
- Graham Mackay (1992, 1993,1994)
- Steve Carter (1992)
- Ryan Girdler (1999-01)
- Craig Gower (2001, 2004, 2005, 2006)
- Matt Adamson (2001)
- Trent Waterhouse (2004, 2009, 2010)
- Luke Rooney (2004)
- Luke Lewis (2004, 2009, 2010)
- Michael Jennings (2009–16)
- Michael Gordon (2010)
- Tim Grant (2012)
- Matt Moylan (2016)
- Josh Mansour (2016)
- James Maloney (2018, 2019)
- Nathan Cleary (2018, 2019, 2020, 2021, 2022, 2023, 2025, 2026)
- Reagan Campbell-Gillard (2018)
- Tyrone Peachey (2018)
- Isaah Yeo (2020, 2021, 2022, 2023, 2024, 2025, 2026)
- Brian To'o (2021, 2022, 2023, 2024, 2025, 2026)
- Jarome Luai (2021, 2022, 2023, 2024)
- Liam Martin (2021, 2022, 2023, 2024, 2025)
- Apisai Koroisau (2021, 2022, 2023)
- Stephen Crichton (2022, 2023)
- Dylan Edwards (2024, 2025)
- Casey McLean (2026)

=== New South Wales (SL) ===
- Craig Gower (1997)
- Ryan Girdler (1997)
- Greg Alexander (1997)

=== Queensland ===
- Darryl Brohman (1983, 1984, 1985, 1986)
- Alan McIndoe (1989, 1990)
- Matt Sing (1995)
- Craig Greenhill (1999, 2000)
- Scott Sattler (2003)
- Rhys Wesser (2004, 2005, 2006)
- Ben Ross (2004, 2005)
- Petero Civoniceva (2008, 2009, 2010, 2011)
- Kurt Capewell (2020, 2021)

=== Coaching ===
New South Wales

- Phil Gould (Coach - 1992, 1993, 1994)

== All Stars Game representatives ==
=== NRL All Stars ===
- (Australia) Michael Jennings (2010, 2011, 2012)
- (Australia) Tim Grant (2013)
- (Australia) Matt Moylan (2015)
- (Australia) Trent Merrin (2016)

=== Indigenous All Stars ===
- Tyrone Peachey (2015, 2016, 2017, 2023)
- Will Smith (2016)
- Jamie Soward (2016)
- Leilani Latu (2016, 2017)

=== Māori All Stars ===
- (Māori people) Dean Whare (2019)
- (Māori people) James Tamou (2019)
- (Māori people) James Fisher Harris (2019, 2021, 2022, 2023)
- (Māori people) Malakai Watene-Zelezniak (2020)
- (Māori people) Zane Tetevano (2020)
- (Māori people) Jarome Luai (2021)

== International representatives ==
=== Australia ===
- (Australia) Royce Simmons (1986–87)
- (Australia) Greg Alexander (1989–90)
- (Australia) John Cartwright (1990–92)
- (Australia) Mark Geyer (1990–91)
- (Australia) Brad Fittler (1991–95)
- (Australia) Graham Mackay (1992)
- (Australia) Matt Sing (1995)
- (Australia) Craig Gower (1999-01, 2003–05)
- (Australia) Ryan Girdler (1999-01)
- (Australia) Trent Waterhouse (2003–05, 2009)
- (Australia) Joel Clinton (2004)
- (Australia) Luke Rooney (2004–05)
- (Australia) Luke Priddis (2005)
- (Australia) Petero Civoniceva (2008–11)
- (Australia) Luke Lewis (2009–12)
- (Australia) Michael Jennings (2009)
- (Australia) Josh Mansour (2014, 2016–17)
- (Australia) Matt Moylan (2016)
- (Australia) Trent Merrin (2016–17)
- (Australia) Reagan Campbell-Gillard (2017)
- (Australia) Nathan Cleary (2022)
- (Australia) Isaah Yeo (2022)
- (Australia) Liam Martin (2022-03)
- (Australia) Dylan Edwards (2023)
- (Australia) Lindsay Smith (2024-05)

Australia (SL)

- (Australia) Craig Gower (1997)
- (Australia) Ryan Girdler (1997)
- (Australia) Matt Adamson (1997)

=== Cook Islands ===
- (Cook Islands) Tinirau Arona (2009)
- (Cook Islands) Geoff Daniela (2012)
- (Cook Islands) Isaac John (2013)
- (Cook Islands) Tupou Sopoaga (2016)

=== Fiji ===
- (Fiji) Livai Nalagilagi (1994)
- (Fiji) Joe Dakuitoga (1995)
- (Fiji) Wes Naiqama (2013–14)
- (Fiji) Eto Nabuli (2014)
- (Fiji) Kevin Naiqama (2014)
- (Fiji) Reagan Campbell-Gillard (2014)
- (Fiji) Apisai Koroisau (2015)
- (Fiji) Viliame Kikau (2016–17, 2019, 2022)
- (Fiji) Waqa Blake (2017)
- (Fiji) Tyrone Phillips (2018)
- (Fiji) Sunia Turuva (2022)

=== Greece ===
- (Greece) Billy Tsikrikas (2019)
- (Greece) George Tsikrikas (2019)

=== Italy ===
- (Italy) Cameron Ciraldo (2013)
- (Italy) Mason Cerruto (2017)
- (Italy) Anton Iaria (2019)
- (Italy) Alexander Myles (2019)
- (Italy) John Trimboli (2019)

=== Malta ===
- (Malta) Jarrod Sammut (2006–07)
- (Malta) Cowen Epere (2017)

=== New Zealand ===
- (New Zealand) Gary Freeman (1994–95)
- (New Zealand) Tony Puletua (1998–00, 2002–07)
- (New Zealand) Joe Galuvao (2003–04)
- (New Zealand) Paul Whatuira (2004)
- (New Zealand) Frank Pritchard (2005–09)
- (New Zealand) Sam McKendry (2010–13)
- (New Zealand) Dean Whare (2013–15, 2017)
- (New Zealand) Isaac John (2014)
- (New Zealand) Lewis Brown (2014–15)
- (New Zealand) Dallin Watene-Zelezniak (2016–18)
- (New Zealand) Te Maire Martin (2016)
- (New Zealand) James Fisher-Harris (2016, 2018–19)

=== Papua New Guinea ===
- (Papua New Guinea) Paul Aiton (2007–08)
- (Papua New Guinea) Keith Peters (2007–09)
- (Papua New Guinea) Jason Chan (2008)
- (Papua New Guinea) James Nightingale (2008)
- (Papua New Guinea) Wellington Albert (2015)
- (Papua New Guinea) Stanton Albert (2015)

=== Samoa ===
- (Samoa) Fa'ausu Afoa (1995)
- (Samoa) Frank Puletua (2000, 2007–08)
- (Samoa) Brian Leauma (2000)
- (Samoa) Fred Petersen (2000)
- (Samoa) Tony Puletua (2008)
- (Samoa) Joseph Paulo (2008–10)
- (Samoa) Masada Iosefa (2010)
- (Samoa) Mose Masoe (2013)
- (Samoa) Jarome Luai (2017–2023)
- (Samoa) Stephen Crichton (2018–2023)
- (Samoa) Tyrone May (2018–2020)
- (Samoa) Brian To'o (2019–2023)
- (Samoa) Moses Leota (2019–2023)
- (Samoa) Spencer Leniu (2022–2023)
- (Samoa) Taylan May (2022)
- (Samoa) Charlie Staines (2022)
- (Samoa) Izack Tago (2022–2023)

=== Scotland ===
- (Scotland) Lachlan Stein (2017)
- (Scotland) Peter Wallace (2013)

=== Tonga ===
- (Tonga) Michael Jennings (2008)
- (Tonga) Daniel Foster (2013–15)
- (Tonga) Sika Manu (2013–15)
- (Tonga) Ben Murdoch-Masila (2014–15)
- (Tonga) Sione Katoa (2016–19)
- (Tonga) Leilani Latu (2017)
- (Tonga) Soni Luke (2022)

=== United States ===
- (United States) Mark O'Halloran (2007)
- (United States) Junior Paulo (2011)
- (United States) Clint Newton (2013)
