= List of Penrith Panthers representatives =

This is a list of Penrith Panthers representatives, rugby league players who were selected for international or domestic representative teams while playing for the Penrith Panthers.

Players chosen from the Windsor Wolves between 2008 and 2013 are included as Windsor was acting as Penrith's New South Wales Cup team during this period.

== International ==
=== Australia ===
- Royce Simmons (1986–87)
- Greg Alexander (1989–90)
- John Cartwright (1990–92)
- Mark Geyer (1990–91)
- Brad Fittler (1991–95)
- Graham Mackay (1992)
- Matt Sing (1995)
- Craig Gower (1999–01, 2003–05)
- Ryan Girdler (1999–01)
- Trent Waterhouse (2003–05, 2009)
- Joel Clinton (2004)
- Luke Rooney (2004–05)
- Luke Priddis (2005)
- Petero Civoniceva (2008–11)
- Michael Jennings (2009)
- Josh Mansour (2014, 2016–17)
- Matt Moylan (2016)
- Trent Merrin (2016–17)
- Reagan Campbell-Gillard (2017)
- Nathan Cleary (2022, 2025)
- Liam Martin (2022–23, 2026)
- Isaah Yeo (2022–26)
- Dylan Edwards (2023–24)
- Lindsay Smith (2024–26)

Australia (SL)

- Craig Gower (1997)
- Ryan Girdler (1997)
- Matt Adamson (1997)

=== Cook Islands ===
- Tinirau Arona (2009)
- Geoff Daniela (2012)
- Isaac John (2013)
- Tupou Sopoaga (2016)
- Delahia Wigmore (2025–26)

=== Fiji ===
- Livai Nalagilagi (1994)
- Joe Dakuitoga (1995)
- Noa Nayacakalou (1995)
- Wes Naiqama (2013–14)
- Eto Nabuli (2014)
- Kevin Naiqama (2014)
- Reagan Campbell-Gillard (2014)
- Apisai Koroisau (2015, 2022)
- Viliame Kikau (2016–17, 2019–22)
- Waqa Blake (2017)
- Tyrone Phillips (2018)
- Sunia Turuva (2022–24)

=== Greece ===
- Billy Tsikrikas (2019)
- George Tsikrikas (2019)

=== Italy ===
- Cameron Ciraldo (2013)
- Mason Cerruto (2017)
- Anton Iaria (2019)
- Alexander Myles (2019)
- John Trimboli (2019)
- Alec Susino (2022)

=== Lebanon ===
- Hanna El-Nachar (2022)

=== Malta ===
- Jarrod Sammut (2006–07)
- Cowen Epere (2017)
- Ryley Smith (2023)

=== New Zealand ===
- Gary Freeman (1994–95)
- Tony Puletua (1998–00, 2002–07)
- Joe Galuvao (2003–04)
- Paul Whatuira (2004)
- Frank Pritchard (2005–09)
- Sam McKendry (2010–13)
- Dean Whare (2013–15, 2017)
- Isaac John (2014)
- Lewis Brown (2014–15)
- Dallin Watene-Zelezniak (2016–18)
- Te Maire Martin (2016)
- James Fisher-Harris (2016, 2018–19, 2022–24)
- Moses Leota (2022–23, 2025–26)
- Scott Sorensen (2022, 2024, 2026)
- Casey McLean (2024–26)
- Isaiah Papali'i (2025–26)

=== Papua New Guinea ===
- Paul Aiton (2007–08)
- Keith Peters (2007–09)
- Jason Chan (2008)
- James Nightingale (2008)
- Wellington Albert (2015)
- Stanton Albert (2015)

=== Poland ===
- Zac Lipowicz (2023)

=== Samoa ===
- Fa'ausu Afoa (1995)
- Frank Puletua (2000, 2007–08)
- Brian Leauma (2000)
- Fred Petersen (2000)
- Junior Tia-Kilifi (2006)
- Joseph Paulo (2007–10)
- Tony Puletua (2008)
- Masada Iosefa (2010)
- Mose Masoe (2013)
- Jarome Luai (2017, 2019, 2022, 2024)
- Christian Crichton (2018)
- Tyrone May (2018)
- Brian To'o (2019, 2022–23, 2025–26)
- Moses Leota (2019)
- Charlie Staines (2022)
- Taylan May (2022)
- Izack Tago (2022–26)
- Spencer Leniu (2022–23)
- Stephen Crichton (2022–23)
- Blaize Talagi (2025)

=== Scotland ===
- Peter Wallace (2013)
- Lachlan Stein (2017)

=== Tonga ===
- Michael Jennings (2008)
- Daniel Foster (2013–15)
- Sika Manu (2013–15)
- Ben Murdoch-Masila (2014–15)
- Sione Katoa (2016–19)
- Leilani Latu (2017)
- Soni Luke (2022, 2024–25)
- Isaiya Katoa (2022)
- Paul Alamoti (2024–26)

=== United States ===
- Mark O'Halloran (2007)
- Junior Paulo (2011)
- Clint Newton (2013)

== State Of Origin ==
=== New South Wales ===
- (New South Wales) Brad Izzard (1982, 1991)
- (New South Wales) Royce Simmons (1984, 1986–88)
- (New South Wales) Greg Alexander (1989–91)
- (New South Wales) John Cartwright (1989, 1991–92)
- (New South Wales) Mark Geyer (1989, 1991)
- (New South Wales) Chris Mortimer (1989)
- (New South Wales) Peter Kelly (1989)
- (New South Wales) Brad Fittler (1990–95)
- (New South Wales) Graham Mackay (1992–94)
- (New South Wales) Steve Carter (1992)
- (New South Wales) Ryan Girdler (1999–01)
- (New South Wales) Craig Gower (2001, 2004–06)
- (New South Wales) Matt Adamson (2001)
- (New South Wales) Trent Waterhouse (2004, 2009–10)
- (New South Wales) Luke Rooney (2004)
- (New South Wales) Luke Lewis (2004, 2009–12)
- (New South Wales) Michael Jennings (2009–12)
- (New South Wales) Michael Gordon (2010)
- (New South Wales) Tim Grant (2012)
- (New South Wales) Matt Moylan (2016)
- (New South Wales) Josh Mansour (2016)
- (New South Wales) James Maloney (2018–19)
- (New South Wales) Nathan Cleary (2018–23, 2025–26)
- (New South Wales) Reagan Campbell-Gillard (2018)
- (New South Wales) Tyrone Peachey (2018)
- (New South Wales) Isaah Yeo (2020–26)
- (New South Wales) Brian To'o (2021–26)
- (New South Wales) Jarome Luai (2021–24)
- (New South Wales) Liam Martin (2021–26)
- (New South Wales) Apisai Koroisau (2021–22)
- (New South Wales) Stephen Crichton (2022–23)
- (New South Wales) Dylan Edwards (2024-25)
- (New South Wales) Casey McLean (2026)

=== New South Wales (SL) ===
- (New South Wales) Craig Gower (1997)
- (New South Wales) Ryan Girdler (1997)
- (New South Wales) Greg Alexander (1997)

=== Queensland ===
- (Queensland) Darryl Brohman (1983, 1986)
- (Queensland) Alan McIndoe (1989–90)
- (Queensland) Trevor Gillmeister (1994)
- (Queensland) Matt Sing (1995)
- (Queensland) Craig Greenhill (1999–00)
- (Queensland) Scott Sattler (2003)
- (Queensland) Rhys Wesser (2004, 2006)
- (Queensland) Ben Ross (2004–05)
- (Queensland) Petero Civoniceva (2008–11)
- (Queensland) Kurt Capewell (2020–21)

== All Stars Game ==
=== NRL All Stars ===
- (Australia) Michael Jennings (2010, 2011, 2012)
- (Australia) Tim Grant (2013)
- (Australia) Matt Moylan (2015)
- (Australia) Trent Merrin (2016)

=== Indigenous All Stars ===
- Tyrone Peachey (2015–16, 2023)
- Will Smith (2016)
- Jamie Soward (2016)
- Leilani Latu (2016)
- Jordan Grant (2024)

=== Māori All Stars ===
- (Māori people) Dean Whare (2019)
- (Māori people) James Tamou (2019)
- (Māori people) James Fisher-Harris (2019, 2021–23)
- (Māori people) Malakai Watene-Zelezniak (2020)
- (Māori people) Zane Tetevano (2020)
- (Māori people) Jarome Luai (2021)
- (Māori people) Preston Riki (2023)
- (Māori people) Jesse McLean (2025)
- (Māori people) Casey McLean (2026)

== City Vs Country Origin ==
=== NSW City ===
- (New South Wales) Greg Alexander (1988)
- (New South Wales) John Cartwright (1990, 1992)
- (New South Wales) Mark Geyer (1991)
- (New South Wales) Paul Clarke (1991)
- (New South Wales) Brad Fittler (1991)
- (New South Wales) Colin van der Voort (1991)
- (New South Wales) Paul Smith (1991)
- (New South Wales) Robbie Beckett (1995)
- (New South Wales) Jody Gall (2001)
- (New South Wales) Craig Gower (2003, 2005–07)
- (New South Wales) Joel Clinton (2003, 2005–06)
- (New South Wales) Shane Rodney (2004)
- (New South Wales) Luke Rooney (2004, 2006, 2008)
- (New South Wales) Luke Lewis (2004–08)
- (New South Wales) Trent Waterhouse (2006, 2009–10)
- (New South Wales) Michael Jennings (2009–10)
- (New South Wales) Lachlan Coote (2010)
- (New South Wales) Tim Grant (2010)
- (New South Wales) Matt Moylan (2014–15)
- (New South Wales) Waqa Blake (2015)
- (New South Wales) Tyrone Peachey (2015–16)
- (New South Wales) Reagan Campbell-Gillard (2015–16)
- (New South Wales) Bryce Cartwright (2016–17)
- (New South Wales) Lelani Latu (2016)
- (New South Wales) Josh Mansour (2016)
- (New South Wales) James Tamou (2017)
- (New South Wales) Nathan Cleary (2017)

=== NSW Country ===
- (New South Wales) Royce Simmons (1988)
- (New South Wales) Chris Mortimer (1989)
- (New South Wales) Steve Carter (1991–92, 1995)
- (New South Wales) Chris Hicks (2001)
- (New South Wales) Luke Priddis (2004, 2006)
- (New South Wales) Amos Roberts (2004)
- (New South Wales) Preston Campbell (2005)
- (New South Wales) Michael Gordon (2011)
- (New South Wales) Jamal Idris (2014)
- (New South Wales) Adam Docker (2014)
- (New South Wales) Isaah Yeo (2016)

== Other honours ==
=== Prime Minister's XIII ===
- (Australia) Luke Priddis (2005)
- (Australia) Ben Ross (2005)
- (Australia) Trent Waterhouse (2006, 2009)
- (Australia) Craig Stapleton (2006)
- (Australia) Michael Jennings (2008–09)
- (Australia) Maurice Blair (2008)
- (Australia) Petero Civoniceva (2009)
- (Australia) Tim Grant (2011)
- (Australia) Lachlan Coote (2012)
- (Australia) Kevin Kingston (2012)
- (Australia) Matt Moylan (2014, 2016)
- (Australia) Josh Mansour (2014)
- (Australia) Jeremy Latimore (2015)
- (Australia) Reagan Campbell-Gillard (2015, 2018)
- (Australia) James Segeyaro (2015)
- (Australia) Tyrone Peachey (2015, 2018)
- (Australia) Matt Eisenhuth (2025)
- (Australia) Liam Henry (2025)

=== Indigenous Dreamtime Team ===
- Rhys Wesser (2008)
- Maurice Blair (2008)

=== New Zealand Māori ===
- (Māori people) Sam McKendry (2008, 2010)
- (Māori people) Sandor Earl (2010)

== Representative captains ==
=== International ===
- Gary Freeman (1994–95)
- Brad Fittler (1995)
- Craig Gower (2005)
- Sika Manu (2014–15)
- Wes Naiqama (2014)
- Tupou Sopoaga (2016)
- Dallin Watene-Zelezniak (2018)
- James Fisher-Harris (2023–24)
- Isaah Yeo (2024–26)
- Jarome Luai (2024)

== Representative Coaching Staff ==
New South Wales

- (New South Wales) Phil Gould (Coach - 1992–94)

NSW City

- (New South Wales) Phil Gould (Coach - 1992–94)

Māori All Stars

- (Māori people) Ben Gardiner (2023)

Samoa

- (Samoa) Ben Gardiner (2023–24)
