= 2000 Rugby League World Cup Group D =

Group D of the 2000 Rugby League World Cup is one of the four groups in the 2000 Rugby League World Cup.

== Standings ==
Pos	Team	Pld	W	D	L	PF	PA	PD	Pts	Qualification
1	Ireland	3	3	0	0	78	38	+40	6	Advance to knockout stage
2	Samoa	3	2	0	1	57	58	−1	4	Advance to knockout stage
3	Aotearoa Māori	3	1	0	2	49	67	−18	2	
4	Scotland	3	0	0	3	34	55	−21	0	

Source: Rugby League Project

== Matches ==
=== Ireland vs Samoa ===
The opening match of the World Cup was accompanied by heavy rain. Samoa's Fred Petersen had to be stretchered off the field after suffering a blow to the head while making a tackle 15 minutes into the second half.

28 October 2000

Ireland	30–16	Samoa
Tries: Joynt, Ricketson, Eagar, Carney, Prescott. Goals: Prescott 5		Tries: Leauma, Milford, Betham. Goals: Geros 2.

Windsor Park, Belfast
Attendance: 3,207
Referee: Tim Mander
Player of the Match: Barrie McDermott

Ireland
1. Steve Prescott, 2. Brian Carney, 3. Michael Withers, 4. Michael Eagar, 5. Forster, 6. Tommy Martyn, 7. Ryan Sheridan
8. O'Connor, 9. Williams, 10. Barrie McDermott, 11. Chris Joynt, 12. Campion, 13. Luke Ricketson
Substitutes: Bretherton, Lawless, Barnhill, Southern. Coach: Steve O'Neill

Samoa
1. Loa Milford, 2. Brian Leauma, 3. Anthony Swann, 4. Gulavao, 5. Francis Meli, 6. Simon Geros, 7. Willie Swann
8. Puletua, 9. Monty Betham, 10. Seu Seu, 11. Solomona, 12. Fred Petersen, 13. Willie Poching
Substitutes: Tatupu, Kololo, Leafa, Faafili.

=== Scotland vs Aotearoa Māori ===
29 October 2000

Scotland	16–17	Aotearoa Māori
Tries: Penny, Maiden, Bell; Goals: Mackay, Crowther		Tries: Toopi 2, Kidwell; Goals: Ngamu 2 Drop Goals: Ngamu

Firhill Stadium, Glasgow
Attendance: 2,008
Referee: Stuart Cummings

Scotland: 1. Lee Penny, 2. Matt Daylight, 3. Graham Mackay, 4. Geoff Bell, 5. Lee Gilmour, 6. Andrew Purcell, 7. Richard Horne
8. Heckenberg, 9. Danny Russell (Captain), 10. Laughton, 11. Scott Logan, 12. Cram, 13. Adrian Vowles.
Substitutes: David Maiden, Matt Crowther, Wayne McDonald, Shaw.
Coach: Shaun McRae

New Zealand Māori: 1. Clinton Toopi, 2. Manuell, 3. Kohe-Love, 4. David Kidwell, 5. Sean Hoppe, 6. Gene Ngamu, 7. H. Te Rangi
8. Rauhihi, 9. Perenara, 10. Terry Hermansson, 11. Koopu, 12. Tyran Smith, 13. Tawera Nikau.
Substitutes: Martin Moana, Leuluai, Nahi, Reihana.

Sin Bin: McDonald (40). Sin Bin: Nikau (40).

=== Ireland vs Scotland ===
1 November 2000

Ireland	18–6	Scotland
Tries: Sheridan, Withers. Goals: Prescott 5.		Tries: Arnold. Goals: Crowther.

Tolka Park, Dublin
Attendance: 1,782
Referee: Russell Smith

Scotland's loose forward, Adrian Vowles was sent to the sin bin midway through the second half for repeated off-side infringements Ireland:
1. Steve Prescott, 2. Brian Carney, 3. Martyn, 4. Eagar, 5. Herron, 6. Michael Withers, 7. Ryan Sheridan
8. O'Connor, 9. Lawless, 10. McDermott, 11. Joynt, 12. Kevin Campion, 13. Luke Ricketson.
Substitutes: Williams, Mathiou, Barnhill, Bradbury.

Scotland: 1. Danny Arnold, 2. Matt Daylight, 3. Lee Gilmour, 4. Bell, 5. Matt Crowther, 6. Horne, 7. Scott Rhodes
8. Heckenberg, 9. Russell, 10. Laughton, 11. Logan, 12. Cram, 13. Adrian Vowles.
Substitutes: Maiden, Graham, McDonald, Shaw.

=== Samoa vs Aotearoa Māori ===
1 November 2000

Samoa	21–16	Aotearoa Māori
Tries: Faafili 2, W Swann, Milford. Goals: Poching 2.		Tries: Mathews, Nelson, Rauhihi. Goals: Goodwin 2.

Derwent Park, Workington
Attendance: 4,107
Referee: Bill Harrigan

=== Ireland vs Aotearoa Māori ===
4 November 2000

Ireland	30–16	Aotearoa Māori

Tolka Park, Dublin
Attendance: 3,164
Referee: Bill Harrigan

=== Scotland vs Samoa ===
5 November 2000

Scotland	12–20	Samoa

Tynecastle Stadium, Edinburgh
Attendance: 1,579
Referee: David Pakieto
