= NRL All Stars =

NRL All Stars may refer to:

- All Stars match, an annual rugby league football match between the Australian Aboriginal rugby league team and the New Zealand Maori rugby league team
- NRL All Stars team, which formerly played in the above match
