= All Stars match =

Annual rugby league football match

Rugby League All Stars
- Current season or competition: 2026 All Stars match
- Sport: Rugby league
- Instituted: 2010
- Inaugural season: 2010
- Number of teams: 2
- Country: Australia (NRL)
- Holders: Māori All-Stars (2026)
- Most titles: Indigenous All-Stars (7 titles)
- Website: NRL.com/AllStars
- Broadcast partner: Nine Network; Fox Sports
- Related competition: National Rugby League

The Rugby League All Stars Match of the National Rugby League is an annual rugby league football match between the specially-formed Indigenous All Stars and an All Stars team, both of whose members are made available for selection public vote. The game has been played since 2010 at a variety of venues across Australia. The player judged man-of-the-match is awarded the Preston Campbell Medal, named after indigenous Gold Coast player, Preston Campbell. Between 2010 and 2015, the Indigenous All Stars opponent was an NRL All Stars team, they were replaced for 2016 by a World All Stars team.

The first match took place on 13 February 2010 at the Gold Coast's Skilled Park and was won 16–12 by the Indigenous All Stars, and winning half-back Johnathan Thurston was awarded the inaugural Preston Campbell award for best player. Players from both sides were primarily chosen by the public, through a voting scheme through the official NRL website. Coaches from both sides then select the voted players into a make up squad, and players specially selected by the coaches are then included to create the full 20-man positional squad. Several rule alterations were also made exclusive to the All Stars which trialled such concepts like the "Double Try" and "Power Play" rule. In 2012, the match trophy was named in honour to indigenous rugby league legend Artie Beetson.

== Rule variations ==
The logo used by the NRL from 2013.

For 2010, the match exhibited several rule variations exclusive to the All stars match:

- A new double try or "power play" rule was trialled during the match. This rule gave a try-scoring team the option to attempt to score another try from a single play-the-ball instead of taking the usual place kicked conversion. The idea is similar to the try rule in American football whereby a touchdown-scoring team can choose to either kick a conversion goal or to attempt to convert via an additional touchdown. The double try would be worth a further four points. The following rules were applied to the double try attempt:
  - The double try attempt was started by the attacking team with a play the ball in the centre of their opponents 20 metre line.
  - The fullback on the defending team was required to leave the field of play for the duration of the play. This meant there were twelve defenders against thirteen attackers.
  - The attacking team was prevented from kicking during the attempt, with the referee ending the play for a restart in the event that the ball was kicked.
  - If the defending team gained possession of the ball the play was over, this meant that the defending team could not score in this situation.
  - If the defending team conceded a penalty, the double try would be awarded automatically.
- The match was divided into quarters rather than halves with 20 minutes between each break. Quarter and three quarter breaks were in five-minute periods and conducted on the field. This is due to the fact that the match is played during summer. Team talks delivered by the coaches during the breaks were broadcast live for the first time.
- Teams had an unlimited interchange limit.
- The match contained four on-field officials, although two were able to referee at a time.
- The video referee was available to explain their decisions to the broadcast commentary team on air for the first time.

For the 2013 game, the following trial experimental rules were introduced:

- Ruck Penalties
  - For infringements in the ruck area by the defending team (holding down, leg pull, hand on ball etc.) which does not result in the breakdown of play (i.e. drop ball), the referee will indicate the infringement by blowing his whistle and signaling the infringement. The match referee will then immediately signal the restart of the tackle count which shall occur at the point of the infringement with a zero tackle.
  - There will be no kick for touch for these infringements. Play will continue immediately from the point of the infringement via a play the ball.
  - Any foul play in the ruck area by the defending team will result in a traditional penalty.
  - Any infringement by the attacking team in the ruck area will result in a traditional penalty.
- Quick Restarts
  - This will see an extension of the quick restart from the 20m, with players allowed quick penalty tap kicks/restarts (apart from ruck penalties) from the point of the offence. Captains questioning decisions will be restricted to when they are in possession and scrums.
- Restarts from Kicks
  - For any attacking team that kicks the ball from the outside the opponents 30m line (30m from try line) and the ball goes dead in-goal, the opponent will receive the ball via a handover (tap restart) from the point where the kick originated once the match officials are in place.

== Preston Campbell Medal ==
The Preston Campbell Medal is awarded to the man of the match and is exclusively voted by the public. The medal is named after Gold Coast Titans and indigenous star Preston Campbell, who was the first person that ventured the idea of the All Stars match.

Year	Recipient	Team	Position	Club
2010	Johnathan Thurston	Indigenous All Stars	Halfback	North Queensland Cowboys
2011	Josh Dugan	NRL All Stars	Fullback	Canberra Raiders
2012	Nathan Merritt	Indigenous All Stars	Winger	South Sydney Rabbitohs
2013	Ben Barba	Indigenous All Stars	Fullback	Canterbury Bulldogs
2014	Not Held			
2015	George Rose	Indigenous All Stars	Prop	St George Illawarra Dragons
2016	James Graham	World All Stars	Prop	Canterbury Bulldogs
2017	Johnathan Thurston	Indigenous All Stars	Five-eighth	North Queensland Cowboys
2018	Not Held			
2019	Tyrone Roberts	Indigenous All Stars	Five-eighth	Gold Coast Titans
2020	Brandon Smith	Māori All Stars	Hooker	Melbourne Storm
2021	James Fisher-Harris	Māori All Stars	Prop	Penrith Panthers
2022	Joseph Tapine	Māori All Stars	Prop	Canberra Raiders
2023	Nicho Hynes	Indigenous All Stars	Halfback	Cronulla Sharks
2024	Braydon Trindall	Indigenous All Stars	Five-eighth	Cronulla Sharks
2025	Jesse Arthars	Māori All Stars	Fullback	Brisbane Broncos
2026	Keano Kini	Māori All Stars	Fullback	Gold Coast Titans

== Results ==
=== Overview ===
Year	Winners	Score	Losers	Venue	City	Crowd
2010	Indigenous All Stars	16–12	NRL All Stars	Gold Coast Football Stadium	Gold Coast	26,687
2011	NRL All Stars	28–12	Indigenous All Stars	Gold Coast Football Stadium	Gold Coast	25,843
2012	NRL All Stars	36–28	Indigenous All Stars	Gold Coast Football Stadium	Gold Coast	26,039
2013	Indigenous All Stars	32–6	NRL All Stars	Brisbane Football Stadium	Brisbane	41,021
2014	Not Held					
2015	Indigenous All Stars	20–6	NRL All Stars	Gold Coast Football Stadium	Gold Coast	23,177
2016	World All Stars	12–8	Indigenous All Stars	Brisbane Football Stadium	Brisbane	37,339
2017	Indigenous All Stars	34–8	World All Stars	Newcastle International Sports Centre	Newcastle	20,241
2018	Not Held					
2019	Indigenous All Stars	34–14	Māori All Stars	Melbourne Rectangular Stadium	Melbourne	18,802
2020	Māori All Stars	30–16	Indigenous All Stars	Gold Coast Football Stadium	Gold Coast	23,599
2021	Māori All Stars	10–10	Indigenous All Stars	Queensland Country Bank Stadium	Townsville	20,206
2022	Māori All Stars	16–10	Indigenous All Stars	Western Sydney Football Stadium	Sydney	26,755
2023	Indigenous All Stars	28–24	Māori All Stars	Rotorua International Stadium	Rotorua	17,644
2024	Indigenous All Stars	22–14	Māori All Stars	Queensland Country Bank Stadium	Townsville	15,579
2025	Māori All Stars	10–6	Indigenous All Stars	Western Sydney Football Stadium	Sydney	21,328
2026	Māori All Stars	16–16	Indigenous All Stars	FMG Stadium	Hamilton	18,169

Note: The All Stars match was not contested in 2014 and 2018.

=== 2010 ===
13 February 2010
8:00pm (AEST)

Indigenous All Stars	16–12	NRL All Stars
Tries: Wendell Sailor (3') 1 Ben Jones (32') 1 Jamie Soward (74') 1 Goals: Johnathan Thurston 2/2 (34', 76'); Field Goals: Scott Prince 0/1	1st: 4–0; 2nd: 6–0; 3rd: 0–8; 4th: 6–4	Tries: Josh Morris (54') 1 Benji Marshall (59') 1 Michael Jennings (61') 1

Skilled Park
Gold Coast, Queensland
Attendance: 26,687
Preston Campbell Medal: Johnathan Thurston
Referee: Shayne Hayne, Ashley Klein, Gavin Badger, Luke Phillips

=== 2011 ===
12 February 2011
8:00pm (AEST)

NRL All Stars	28–12	Indigenous All Stars
Tries: Brett Morris (3') 1 Paul Gallen (24') 1 Shaun Kenny-Dowall (32') 1 Akuila Uate (35') 1 Josh Dugan (72') 1 Goals: Benji Marshall 2/2 (33', 36'); Cameron Smith 1/2 (25'); Kurt Gidley 1/1 (73')	1st: 4–0; 2nd: 18–6; 3rd: 0–6; 4th: 6–0	Tries: Ben Barba (40') 1 Nathan Merritt (59') 1 Goals: Johnathan Thurston 1/1 (40'); Scott Prince 1/1 (60')

Skilled Park
Gold Coast, Queensland
Attendance: 25,843
Preston Campbell Medal: Josh Dugan
Referee: Shayne Hayne, Ben Cummins, Gavin Badger, Henry Perenara

=== 2012 ===
4 February 2012
7:15pm (AEST)

NRL All Stars	36–28	Indigenous All Stars
Tries: Frank Pritchard (26') 1 Luke Lewis (35') 1 Luke Bailey (45') 1 Josh Dugan (50') 1 Jack Reed (64') 1 Manu Vatuvei (73') 1 Goals: Benji Marshall 6/6 (27', 36', 46', 50', 65', 75')	1st: 0–12; 2nd: 12–10; 3rd: 12–0; 4th: 12–6	Tries: Nathan Merritt (19', 38') 2 Jharal Yow Yeh (6') 1 Matt Bowen (29') 1 Greg Inglis (68') 1 Goals: Johnathan Thurston 3/4 (7', 19', 31'); Chris Sandow 1/1 (70')

Skilled Park
Gold Coast, Queensland
Attendance: 26,039
Preston Campbell Medal: Nathan Merritt
Referee: Ashley Klein, Jason Robinson, Phil Haines, Gerard Sutton

=== 2013 ===
9 February 2013
7:45pm (AEST)

Indigenous All Stars	32–6	NRL All Stars
Tries: Ben Barba (10', 20', 31') 3 Reece Robinson (46', 71', 78') 3 Goals: Johnathan Thurston 3/4 (11', 20', 32'); Scott Prince 1/1 (72'); Aidan Sezer 0/1	1st: 12–6; 2nd: 6–0; 3rd: 4–0; 4th: 10–0	Tries: Jarryd Hayne (13') 1 Adam Reynolds 1/1 (15')

Suncorp Stadium
Brisbane, Queensland
Attendance: 41,201
Preston Campbell Medal: Ben Barba
Referee: Ashley Klein, Jason Robinson, Chris James, Gavin Morris

=== 2015 ===
13 February 2015
8:00pm (AEST)

Indigenous All Stars	20–6	NRL All Stars
Tries: Greg Inglis (51') 1 Will Chambers (64') 1 Chris Grevsmuhl (78') 1 Goals: Johnathan Thurston 4/4 (53', 66', 75' pen, 79')	1st: 0–0; 2nd: 0–6; 3rd: 6–0; 4th: 14–0	Tries: Dylan Walker (29') 1 Goals: Jarrod Croker 1/1 (30')

Cbus Super Stadium
Gold Coast, Queensland
Attendance: 23,177
Preston Campbell Medal: George Rose
Referee: Gerard Sutton, Grant Atkins

=== 2016 ===
13 February 2016, 8:00pm (AEST)

Indigenous All Stars	8–12	World All-Stars
Tries: Leilani Latu 1 Dane Gagai 1 Goals: 0		Tries: 1 Konrad Hurrell; 1 Semi Radradra; Goals: 2/3 Adam Reynolds

Suncorp Stadium, Brisbane
Attendance: 37,339
Referee: Matt Cecchin, Allan Shortall
Player of the Match: James Graham (Preston Campbell Medal)

=== 2017 ===
10 February 2017
8:15pm AEDT

Indigenous All Stars	34–8	World All Stars
Tries: Jack Bird (4') 1 Blake Ferguson (7') 1 Ashley Taylor (13') 1 Johnathan Thurston (41') 1 Dane Gagai (59') 1 Leilani Latu (70') 1 Goals: Johnathan Thurston 4/5 (4', 14', 43', 60'); Aiden Sezer 1/1 (72')		Tries: 1 (36') David Mead; 1 (39') Nene Macdonald; Goals: Jarrod Croker 0/2

McDonald Jones Stadium
Attendance: 20,241
Preston Campbell Medal: Johnathan Thurston

=== 2019 ===
15 February 2019
8:20pm (AEDT)

Indigenous All Stars	34–14	(Māori people) Māori All Stars
Tries: Josh Addo-Carr (11', 14') 2 Bevan French (33') 1 Blake Ferguson (39') 1 David Fifita (45') 1 Cody Walker (64') 1 Josh Kerr (73') 1 Goals: Latrell Mitchell 3/7 (15', 40', 75'); Field Goals: Tyrone Roberts 0/1		Tries: Dane Gagai (3', 28') 2 Esan Marsters (51') 1 Goals: Jordan Kahu 1/2 (4'); Esan Marsters 0/1

AAMI Park
Attendance: 18,802
Preston Campbell Medal: Tyrone Roberts
Referee: Grant Atkins, Gavin Badger

=== 2020 ===
22 February 2020
7:20pm (AEST)

Indigenous All Stars	16–30	Māori All Stars
Tries: Joshua Curran (18') 1 Blake Ferguson (40') 1 James Roberts (57') 1 Goals: Tyrone Roberts 1/2 (20'); Blake Ferguson 1/1 (58')	1st: 6–6; 2nd: 4–6; 3rd: 6–0; 4th: 0–18	Tries: Brandon Smith (70', 75') 2 Dallin Watene-Zelezniak (5') 1 Kodi Nikorima (27') 1 Dylan Walker (80') 1 Goals: Kalyn Ponga 4/4 (6', 29', 71', 75'); Adam Blair 1/1 (80'); Sin Bin: Jahrome Hughes (23') 1

Cbus Super Stadium
Attendance: 23,599
Referee: Gerard Sutton, Peter Gough
Player of the Match: Brandon Smith (Preston Campbell Medal)

=== 2021 ===
20 February 2021
7:15pm (AEST)

Indigenous All Stars	10–10	(Māori people) Māori All Stars
Tries: Alex Johnston (64') 1 Goals: Latrell Mitchell 2/2 (65', 80' pen); Jamal Fogarty 1/1 (20' pen); Sin Bin: Tyrone Peachey (60') 1	1st: 2–0; 2nd: 0–0; 3rd: 0–10; 4th: 8–0	Tries: Jordan Riki (49') 1 Dallin Watene-Zelezniak (53') 1 Goals: Patrick Herbert 1/2 (51'); Sin Bin: Zane Musgrove (35') 1

Queensland Country Bank Stadium
Attendance: 20,206
Preston Campbell Medal: James Fisher-Harris
Referee: Adam Gee

=== 2022 ===
12 February 2022
8:20pm (AEDT)

Māori All Stars (Māori people)	16–10	Indigenous All Stars
Tries: Kodi Nikorima (25') 1 Esan Marsters (33') 1 Joseph Tapine (57') 1 Goals: Patrick Herbert 1/2 (27'); Kodi Nikorima 1/1 (58'); Sin Bin: Jordan Rapana (20') 1	1st: 0 – 6; 2nd: 10 – 0; 3rd: 6 – 0; 4th: 0 – 4 Highlights	Tries: Jesse Ramien (13') 1 Tyrell Sloan (67') 1 Goals: Braydon Trindall 1/1 (20' pen); Nicho Hynes 0/2; Sin Bin: Andrew Fifita (20') 1 Jesse Ramien (56') 1

CommBank Stadium
Attendance: 26,755
Preston Campbell Medal: Joseph Tapine
Referee: Adam Gee

=== 2023 ===
11 February 2023
5:50 pm (NZDT UTC+13:00)
3:50 pm (AEDT UTC+11:00)

Māori All Stars (Māori people)	24 – 28	Indigenous All Stars
Tries: 4 Dockar-Clay 3'; Arthars 23'; J. Riki 55'; P. Riki 78'; Goals: 4/4; Rapana 5', 25', 56', 78'	1st: 6–4; 2nd: 6–6; 3rd: 6–6; 4th: 6–12; Report	Tries: 6 Cobbo 62', 69', 73'; Sloan 15'; Hynes 35'; Naden 45'; Goals: 2/4; Hynes 37', 47'; 0/2; L. Mitchell

Rotorua International Stadium, Rotorua
Attendance: 17,644
Referee: Gerard Sutton
Preston Campbell Medal: Nicho Hynes

=== 2024 ===
16 February 2024
19:15 AEST

Indigenous All Stars	22–14	(Māori people) Māori All Stars
Tries: 4 Addo-Carr 7', 17'; Tabuai-Fidow 30'; Khan-Pereira 71'; Goals: 3 Hynes 3/4 19', 32', 72'	Report; 1st: 10–8; 2nd: 6–0; 3rd: 0–0; 4th: 6–6	Tries: 2 Tapine 4'; Willison 80'; Goals: 3 Nikorima 2/2 6', 20 pen' Gagai 1/1 80'

Queensland Country Bank Stadium, Townsville
Attendance: 15,579
Referee: Todd Smith
Preston Campbell Medal: Braydon Trindall

=== 2025 ===
15 February 2025
19:30 AEDT

Indigenous All Stars	6–10	(Māori people) Māori All Stars
Tries: 1 Mitchell 41'; Goals: 1 Puru 1/1 43'	Report	Tries: 2 Arthars 57'; Laban 67'; Goals: 1 Hiroti 0/1; Nikorima 1/1 68'

CommBank Stadium, Sydney
Attendance: 21,328
Referee: Todd Smith
Touch judges: Dave Munro, Chris Sutton

=== 2026 ===
2026 Rugby League All Stars

15 March 2026
15:55 NZDT (UTC+13)

Māori All Stars (Māori people)	16 – 16	Indigenous All Stars
Tries: 3 Laban 4'; Watene-Zelezniak 30'; Toelau 54'; Goals: 2 Hiroti 5', 55' (2/2); Pompey 31' (0/1); Field goals: 0 Dockar-Clay 80'	1st: 10–12; 2nd: 6–4; Report	Tries: 3 Steep 9'; Watson 15'; Addo-Carr 45'; Goals: 2 Hynes 11', 16' 47' (2/3)

FMG Stadium Waikato
Attendance: 18,169
Referee: Adam Gee
Video referee: Ashley Klein
Touch judges: Matt Noyen, Dave Munro
Preston Campbell Medal: Keano Kini (Māori All Stars)

== Women's All Stars Matches Results ==
The Women's All Stars Match is the Women's rugby league version of the game and has been running since 2011.

=== Overview ===
Year	Winning team	Score	Losing team	Venue	City/Town	Region/State	Nation	Crowd
2011	Women's All Stars	20–6	Indigenous Women's All Stars	Skilled Park	G. Coast	Queensland	Australia	25,843
2012	Women's All Stars	10–10	Indigenous Women's All Stars	Skilled Park	G. Coast	Queensland	Australia	
2013	Women's All Stars	38–6	Indigenous Women's All Stars	Suncorp Stadium	Brisbane	Queensland	Australia	41,021
2014	Women's All Stars	24–0	Indigenous Women's All Stars	Allianz Stadium	Sydney	N.S.W	Australia	25,429
2015	Women's All Stars	26–8	Indigenous Women's All Stars	Skilled Park	G. Coast	Queensland	Australia	23,177
2016	Women's All Stars	24–4	Indigenous Women's All Stars	Suncorp Stadium	Brisbane	Queensland	Australia	37,339
2017	Indigenous Women's All Stars	14–4	Women's All Stars	McDonald Jones Stadium	Newcastle	N.S.W	Australia	20,241
2019	Māori Women's All Stars	8–4	Indigenous Women's All Stars	AAMI Park	Melbourne	Victoria	Australia	18,802
2020	Indigenous Women's All Stars	10–4	Māori Women's All Stars	Cbus Super Stadium	G. Coast	Queensland	Australia	23,599
2021	Māori Women's All Stars	24–0	Indigenous Women's All Stars	Queensland Country Bank Stadium	Townsville	Queensland	Australia	20,206
2022	Indigenous Women's All Stars	18–8	Māori Women's All Stars	CommBank Stadium	Sydney	N.S.W	Australia	10,066
2023	Māori Women's All Stars	18–8	Indigenous Women's All Stars	Rotorua International Stadium	Rotorua	Auckland	New Zealand	17,644
2024	Indigenous Women's All Stars	26–4	Māori Women's All Stars	Queensland Country Bank Stadium	Townsville	Queensland	Australia	15,579
2025	Māori Women's All Stars	10–6	Indigenous Women's All Stars	CommBank Stadium	Sydney	N.S.W	Australia	21,328
2026	Indigenous Women's All Stars	20–14	Māori Women's All Stars	FMG Stadium Waikato	Hamilton	Waikato	New Zealand	18,169

=== 2011 ===
12 February 2011

Indigenous All Stars	6–20	NRL All-Stars
Tries: 1 Goals: 1	Result	Tries: Goals:

Robina Stadium, Gold Coast, Queensland

=== 2012 ===
4 February 2012, 3:10pm(AEST)

Indigenous All Stars	10–10	NRL All-Stars
Tries: 2 Sarah Sailor 1 Chloe Caldwell 1 Goals: 1	Result	Tries: 2 Goals: 1

Robina Stadium, Gold Coast, Queensland
Player of the Match: Naomi Bobongie

=== 2013 ===
9 February 2013

Indigenous All Stars	6–38	NRL All-Stars
Tries: 1 Amber Saltner 1 Goals: 1 Amber Saltner 1	Result	Tries: Goals:

Robina Stadium, Gold Coast, Queensland

=== 2014 ===
The match was held as the main curtain raiser for the 2014 Anzac Test.

2 May 2014, 6:05pm(AEDT)

Indigenous All Stars	0–24	NRL All-Stars
Tries: nil Goals: nil		Tries: 5 Renae Kunst 1 Tegan Chandler 1 Emily Andrews 1 Ali Brigginshaw 1 Sam Hammond 1 Goals: 2 Ali Brigginshaw 2/5

Allianz Stadium, Moore Park, Sydney

=== 2015 ===
The Women's All Stars exhibition match which was held as a curtain raiser for the men's 2015 All Stars match and was won by the NRL Women's All Stars 26–8.

13 February 2015

Indigenous All Stars	8–26	NRL All-Stars
Tries: 2 Latoya Billy 2 Goals: nil	HT 4-14; Report	Tries: 5 Kezie Apps 2 Kellye Hodges 1 Ali Brigginshaw 1 Annette Brander 1 Goals: 3 Ali Brigginshaw 2 Steph Hancock

Cbus Super Stadium, Robina
Attendance: 23,177
Player of the Match: Kezie Apps

=== 2016 ===
13 February 2016
4.25pm (AEST)

Indigenous Woman All Stars	4–24	Woman All Stars team
Tries: 1 Elizabeth Cook-Black; Goals: nil		Tries:5; Heather Ballinger 2 Chelsea Baker 1 Shanice Parker 1 Sam Bremner 1 Goals: 2 Maddie Studdon 2

Suncorp Stadium
Referee: Jarred Maxwell & Ben Cummins
Player of the Match: Maddie Studdon

=== 2017 ===
10 February 2017

Indigenous Women's All Stars	14–4	Women's World All Stars
Tries: 3 Samartha Leisha 24' 1 Suvanaha Connors 33' 1 Tahlia Hunter 56' 1 Goals: Caitlin Moran 25'	HT 6-0; Highlights; Report	Tries: 1 Selena Tranter 59' 1 Goals: nil

McDonald Jones Stadium
Referee: Jake Sutherland

=== 2019 ===
15 February 2019
AEDT

Indigenous Women's All Stars	4–8	Māori Women's All Stars
Tries: 1 Shakiah Tungai (31') 1 Goals: nil	HT 4-4; Report; Highlights	Tries: 2 Tyler Birch (10') 1 Krystal Rota (54') 1 Goals: nil

AAMI Park, Melbourne
Referee: Ziggy Przeklasa-Adamski, Belinda Sleeman
Player of the Match: Krystal Rota

=== 2020 ===
22 February 2020

Indigenous Women's All Stars	10–4	(Māori people) Maori Women's All Stars
Tries: 2 Stephanie Mooka 12' 1, Nakia Davis-Welsh 47' 1 Goals: 1 Shakiah Tungai (0/1); Jenni-Sue Hooper (1/1	HT 4-4; Report	Tries: 1 Kerehitina Matua 2' 1 Goals: nil Kerehitina Matua (0/1)

Cbus Super Stadium
Referees: Liam Kennedy, Kasey Badger
Player of the Match: Nakia Davis-Welsh

=== 2021 ===
20 February 2021
4:40pm (AEST)

Indigenous All Stars	0–24	(Māori people) Māori All Stars
Tries: nil Goals: nil	1st: 0 – 12; 2nd: 0 – 4; 3rd: 0 – 8; 4th: 0 – 0	Tries: 5 Raecene McGregor (2', 44') 2 Amy Turner (9') 1 Shanice Parker (38') 1 Page McGregor (44') 1 Goals: 2 Zahara Temara 2/5 (4', 11')

Queensland Country Bank Stadium
Attendance:
Player of the Match: Raecene McGregor
Referee: Belinda Sharpe

=== 2022 ===
12 February 2022
5:20pm (AEDT)

Indigenous All Stars	18—8	(Māori people) Māori All Stars
Tries: 3 Jamie Chapman (23', 32') 2 Tommaya Kelly-Sines (46') 1 Goals: 3 Kirra Dibb (24', 34', 48') 3/3	1st: 0—0; 2nd: 6—4; 3rd: 6—4; 4th: 6—0; Reports	Tries: 2 Autumn-Rain Stephens Daly (29', 42') 2 Goals: nil

CommBank Stadium
Attendance: 10,066
Referee: Kasey Badger
Player of the Match: Jaime Chapman

=== 2023 ===
11 February 2023
3:30 pm (NZDT UTC+13:00)
1:30 pm (AEDT UTC+11:00)

Māori All Stars (Māori people)	16 – 12	Indigenous All Stars
Tries: 4 Fay 6', 55'; Strange 19'; Turner 47'; Goals: 0/4	HT: 8–6; Report	Tries: 2 Taylor 25'; Joseph 39'; Goals: 2/3; Dibb 15', 41'

Rotorua International Stadium, Rotorua
Attendance: 12,273
Referee: Rochelle Tamarua
Touch judges: Paki Parkinson, Viggo Rasmussen
Trish Hina Medal: Gayle Broughton

=== 2024 ===
16 February 2024
17:50 AEDT

Indigenous All Stars	26–4	(Māori people) Māori All Stars
Tries: 5 Bent 14'; Chapman 17', 32'; Hunt 24', 56'; Goals: 3 Dibb 3/5 19', 24', 33'	Report; 1st: 4–0; 2nd: 12–0; 3rd: 6–0; 4th: 4–4	Tries: 1 Strange 48'; Goals: 0 McGregor 0/1

Queensland Country Bank Stadium, Townsville
Referee: Liam Kennedy
Trish Hina Medal: Kirra Dibb

=== 2025 ===
15 February 2025
17:50 AEDT

Indigenous Women's All Stars	20 – 18	(Māori people) Māori Ferns
Tries: 3 Donovan 2'; Chapman 9'; Koster 35'; Goals: 3 Dibb 2/4 10', 20'; Montgomery 2/3 53', 59'	Report	Tries: 3 Chanté Temara 13'; Clarke 25'; White 28'; Goals: 3 McGregor 3/3 14', 27', 29'

CommBank Stadium, Sydney
Referee: Karra-Lee Nolan
Trish Hina Medal: Keilee Joseph

=== 2026 ===
2026 Rugby League All Stars

Sunday, 15 March
13:45 NZDT (UTC+13)

Māori All Stars (Māori people)	14 – 20	Indigenous All Stars
Tries: 3 Willison 11', 23'; Butler 6'; Goals: 1 Temara 7' 13', 25' (1/3)	1st: 14–0; 2nd: 0–20; Report	Tries: 4 Hippi 33'; Turnbull 35'; Blackwell 46'; Taylor 59'; Goals: 2 Dibb 35', 47' 34', 60' (2/4)

FMG Stadium Waikato
Attendance: 18,169
Referee: Belinda Sharpe
Video referee: Ashley Klein
Trish Hina Medal: Krystal Blackwell (Indigenous All Stars)

== See also ==
- NRL All Stars match results and statistics
