= Mark O'Halloran =

Mark O'Halloran may refer to:

- Mark O'Halloran (rugby league) (born 1981), Australian rugby league footballer
- Mark O'Halloran (writer), Irish scriptwriter and actor
