= Gerard Beale =

NZ international rugby league footballer

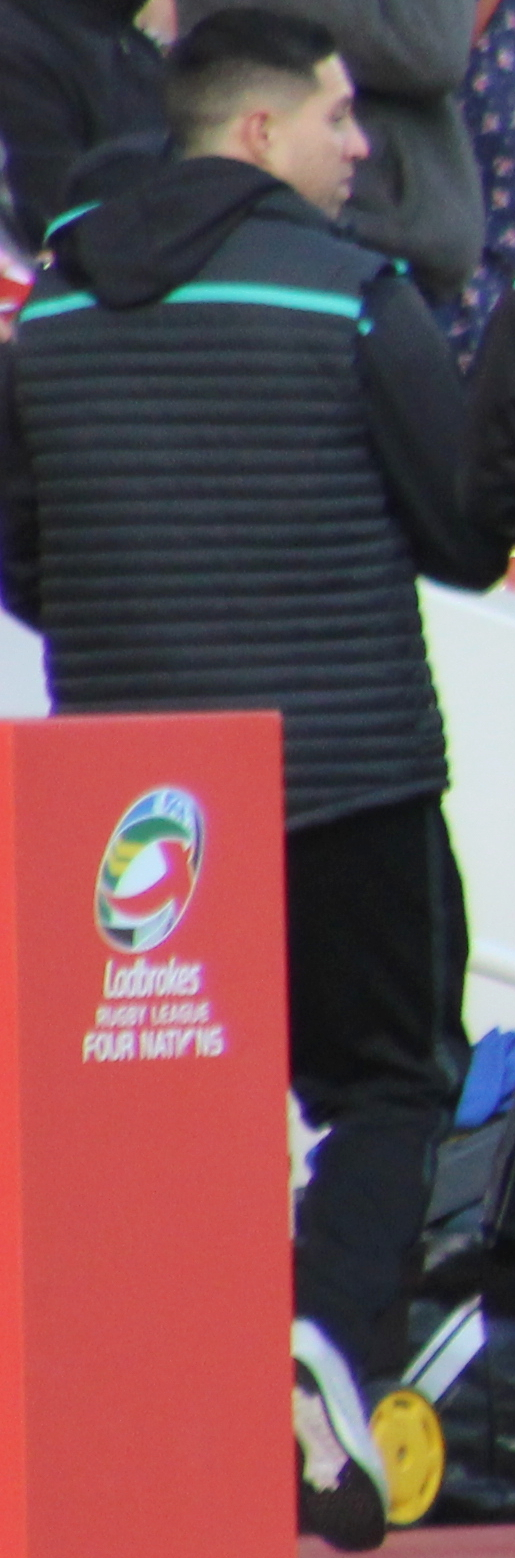

Personal information
- Born: 18 July 1990 (age 36) Brisbane, Queensland, Australia
- Height: 181 cm (5 ft 11 in)
- Weight: 97 kg (15 st 4 lb)

Playing information
- Position: Centre, Wing, Fullback
Club
Years	Team	Pld	T	G	FG	P
2009–12	Brisbane Broncos	63	20	0	0	80
2013–14	St George Illawarra	29	10	0	0	40
2015–17	Cronulla Sharks	70	14	0	0	56
2018–20	New Zealand Warriors	32	4	0	0	16
2021	St George Illawarra	10	4	0	0	16
	Total	204	52	0	0	208
Representative
Years	Team	Pld	T	G	FG	P
2011–17	New Zealand	11	5	0	0	20
2017	World All Stars	1	0	0	0	0
2019	Māori All Stars	1	0	0	0	0
- Source: As of 11 June 2021

Gerard Beale (born 18 July 1990) is a New Zealand international rugby league professional footballer who last played for the St. George Illawarra Dragons in the NRL.

Beale previously played for the Brisbane Broncos, St. George Illawarra and the Cronulla-Sutherland Sharks in the National Rugby League, winning the 2016 NRL Grand Final with the Sharks. He has played for the World All Stars and New Zealand Māori.

== Background ==
Beale was born in Brisbane, Queensland, Australia to parents Mick, from Christchurch, and Laurise, from the Chatham Islands. He is of Māori descent, specifically the Te Āti Awa Iwi (tribe).

He played his junior rugby league for Logan Brothers before signed to play professionally for the Brisbane Broncos. Beale is a distant cousin of All Black great Zinzan Brooke. Beale played for the Brisbane Broncos NYC team in 2009–2010.

== Playing career ==
=== 2009 ===
In Round 9 of the 2009 NRL season, Beale made his NRL debut for the Brisbane Broncos against the Manly-Warringah Sea Eagles as a last minute replacement for Karmichael Hunt at fullback in the Broncos 22–20 loss at Suncorp Stadium. This was Beale's only match for the Brisbane Broncos in the 2009 NRL season.

=== 2010 ===
In Round 9 against the Melbourne Storm at the club's first match at their new home ground AAMI Park, Beale scored his first NRL career try off the interchange bench in the Broncos upset 36–14 win. Beale finished the Brisbane Broncos 2010 NRL season with him playing in 10 matches and scoring 2 tries. In October 2010, Beale played for the Junior Kangaroos.

=== 2011 ===
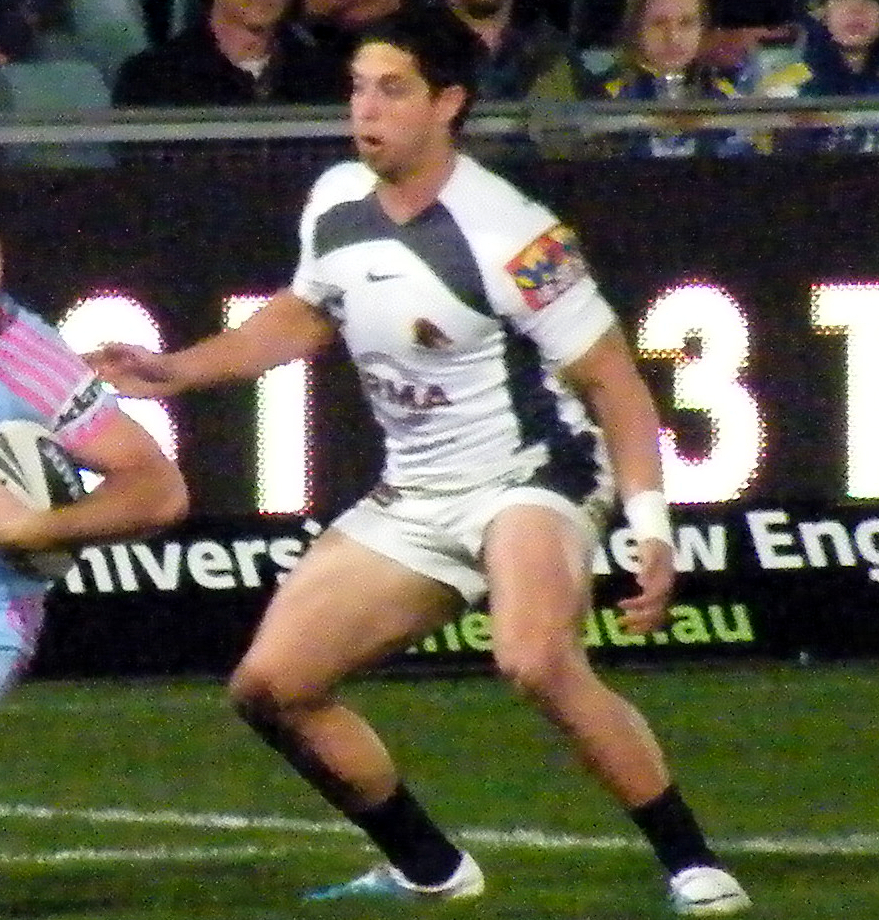
Beale playing for the Broncos in 2011

In May 2011, Beale switched his eligibility allegiance to New Zealand. Beale was named in the New Zealand Kiwis 19th-man Squad to play Australia in the annual ANZAC Test match at Gold Coast's Cbus Super Stadium, however did not play in the match. In the Semi Finals match against the St George Illawarra Dragons at Suncorp Stadium, Beale accidentally kneed retiring Broncos legend Darren Lockyer in the cheek while catching a high ball near the end of the match, Lockyer later kicked the winning field goal in golden extra time to win the Broncos the match 13–12. This resulted in Lockyer's last Broncos match after he missed the Broncos 26–14 preliminary Final loss to the Manly Warringah Sea Eagles at SFS. Beale finished the Brisbane Broncos 2011 NRL season with him playing in all of the Broncos 27 matches and scoring 10 tries. Beale was named in the New Zealand Kiwis Squad to play in the Four Nations Tournament in the UK. Beale made his international debut for New Zealand against Australia at Hunter Stadium on 28 October 2011 playing as centre. Beale played in all of the Kiwis 3 matches in the tournament scoring two tries against Wales in the Kiwis 36–0 win at Wembley Stadium.

=== 2012 ===
On 3 April 2012, Beale signed a 3-year contract with the St George Illawarra Dragons, starting from the 2013 NRL season. Beale finished his last year with the Brisbane Broncos in the 2012 NRL season with him playing in all of the Broncos 25 matches and scoring 8 tries. On 13 October 2012, Beale was selected to play on the left wing for New Zealand in the October test against Australia at Townsville's 1300SMILES Stadium in Queensland. Beale scored a try in the left corner in New Zealand's 18–10 loss.

=== 2013 ===
In Round 1 of the 2013 NRL season against the Melbourne Storm at AAMI Park, Beale made his club debut for the St George Illawarra Dragons at fullback in the Dragons 30–10 loss. In Round 5 against the Newcastle Knights at Jubilee Oval, Beale suffered a season ending knee injury in the Dragons 19–16 win. Beale finished his first year with the St George Illawarra Dragons in the 2013 NRL season with him playing in 5 matches.

=== 2014 ===
In Round 1 against the Wests Tigers at ANZ Stadium, Beale scored his first club try for Dragons in the 44–24 win. On 2 May 2014, Beale was selected to play for New Zealand at centre in the 2014 ANZAC Test match against Australia in the Kiwis 30–18 loss at SFS. Beale finished off the 2014 NRL season with him playing in all of the Dragons 24 matches and scoring 11 tries. On 7 October 2014, Beale was selected in the New Zealand national rugby league team final 24-man squad for the 2014 Four Nations. Beale only played in 1 match in the tournament which was in the Kiwis 30–12 victory against Australia at Suncorp Stadium. On 19 November 2014, Beale signed a three-year deal with the Cronulla-Sutherland Sharks, starting from 2015.

=== 2015 ===
On 23 January 2015, Beale was named in Cronulla-Sutherland's 2015 NRL Auckland Nines squad. In Round 1 of the 2015 NRL season, Beale made his club debut for the Cronulla-Sutherland Sharks against the Canberra Raiders at centre in the Sharks 24–20 loss at Shark Park. In Round 8 against the Penrith Panthers, Beale played his 100th NRL career match in the 26–18 loss at Penrith Stadium. In Round 22 against the North Queensland Cowboys, Beale scored his first club try for the Cronulla-Sutherland Sharksin the 30–18 win at Shark Park. Beale finished his first year at Cronulla-Sutherland with him playing in all 26 matches and scoring two tries.

=== 2016 ===
On 29 January, Beale was named in the Cronulla club's 2016 Auckland Nines squad. On 1 April 2016, there were rumours that Beale was going make a shift to the Melbourne Storm early into the season but Cronulla-Sutherland were not keen on granting an early release. On 6 May 2016, Beale played for the New Zealand national rugby league team against Australia, playing at centre in the 16–0 loss at Hunter Stadium. As the Sharks progressed in the finals, Beale was shifted from centre to the interchange bench to act as the Sharks main interchange utility. On 2 October 2016, in Cronulla-Sutherland's 2016 NRL Grand Final against the Melbourne Storm, Beale played off the interchange bench in Cronulla's historic 14–12 win, ending the drought of their first ever premiership win in their 49 years in the NRL at ANZ Stadium. Beale finished the Sharks successful 2016 NRL season with him playing in 23 matches and scoring five tries. On 4 October 2016, Beale was selected in the New Zealand national rugby league team final 24-man squad for the 2016 Four Nations. Beale played in 2 matches in the tournament and scored 2 tries which were scored in the Kiwis shock 18–18 all draw against Scotland at Derwent Park.

=== 2017 ===
In February 2017, Beale was selected in the Sharks 2017 NRL Auckland Nines squad. On 10 February 2017, Beale played for the World All Stars against the Indigenous All Stars in the 2017 All Stars match, starting at centre in the 34–8 loss at Hunter Stadium. In Round 14 against the Melbourne Storm, Beale played his 150th NRL match in the 18–13 loss at Shark Park. On 8 September 2017, Beale signed a 3-year deal with the New Zealand Warriors, starting in 2018. Beale finished his last year with the Cronulla-Sutherland Sharks with him playing in 21 matches and scoring 7 tries in the 2017 NRL season. On 5 October 2017, Beale was named in the 24-man New Zealand Kiwis squad for the 2017 Rugby League World Cup. In the Kiwis first pool match against Samoa, Beale suffered a broken leg during the second half of the Kiwis 38–8 win at Mt Smart Stadium, unfortunately ending his tournament early and to miss the early rounds of the 2018 season.

=== 2018 - 2020 ===
In 2018, Beale signed a three-year deal with the New Zealand Warriors. Beale made 13 appearances for New Zealand in the 2018 NRL season as the club qualified for the finals for the first time since 2011. Beale played in the club's elimination final loss to Penrith.

In 2019, Beale played twelve games for New Zealand in the 2019 NRL season as the club missed out on the finals. Beale was limited to only seven appearances for New Zealand in the 2020 NRL season as the club once again missed out on the finals. At the end of the season he announced his retirement.

=== 2021 ===
Beale played for the Brisbane Tigers in 2021 in the Queensland's Intrust Super Cup. On 18 May, St. George Illawarra announced that the club had signed Beale for the remainder of the season. The announcement came eight months after Beale announced his retirement from the NRL.

Beale made his return to St. George Illawarra in round 12 of the 2021 NRL season against the Wests Tigers where the club lost 34–18.

== Statistics ==
Year	Team	Games	Tries	Pts
2009	Brisbane Broncos	1		
2010	Brisbane Broncos	10	2	8
2011	Brisbane Broncos	27	10	40
2012	Brisbane Broncos	25	8	32
2013	St. George Illawarra Dragons	5		
2014	St. George Illawarra Dragons	24	10	40
2015	Cronulla-Sutherland Sharks	26	2	8
2016	Cronulla-Sutherland Sharks	23	5	20
2017	Cronulla-Sutherland Sharks	21	7	28
2018	New Zealand Warriors	13	3	12
2019	New Zealand Warriors	12	1	4
2020	New Zealand Warriors	7		
2021	St. George Illawarra Dragons	10	4	16
	Totals	204	52	208

== Controversy ==
On 5 July 2021, Beale was fined $2000 by the NRL and suspended for one game after breaching the game's COVID-19 biosecurity protocols when he attended a party along with 12 other St. George Illawarra players at Paul Vaughan's property.
