= 2017 All Stars match =

Australian rugby league match

Indigenous All Stars	World All Stars
34	8
	1	2	3	4	Total
IND	16	0	12	6	34
WAS	0	8	0	0	8
- Date: Friday 10 February 2017
- Stadium: McDonald Jones Stadium
- Location: Newcastle, New South Wales
- Preston Campbell Medal: Johnathan Thurston
- Referee: Grant Atkins
- Attendance: 20,241

Broadcast partners
- Broadcasters: Nine Network
- Commentators: Mat Thompson Phil Gould Peter Sterling Andrew Johns

The 2017 All Stars match was the seventh annual representative exhibition All Stars match of Australian rugby. The match was played between the Indigenous All Stars and the World All Stars and for the first time, the match was played outside of Queensland. Mal Meninga took over as coach of the World All Stars from Wayne Bennett.

The Indigenous All Stars were selected through public vote from 7 November to 2 December 2016. Both sides were announced on 14 December.

== Teams ==
INDIGENOUS ALL STARS	Position	WORLD ALL STARS
Jack Wighton	Fullback	(Papua New Guinea) David Mead^{9}
Blake Ferguson	Wing	(Fiji) Akuila Uate
Greg Inglis (c)	Centre	(New Zealand) Gerard Beale^{4}
Jack Bird^{1}	Centre	(Australia) Jarrod Croker^{8}
Dane Gagai	Wing	(Papua New Guinea) Nene Macdonald
Johnathan Thurston (c)	Five-eighth	(Lebanon) Mitchell Moses
Ashley Taylor	Halfback	(The Gambia) Moses Mbye^{5}
Ryan James	Prop	(Australia) Jordan McLean
Nathan Peats	Hooker	(Australia) Jake Friend (c)
Andrew Fifita	Prop	(Fiji) Reagan Campbell-Gillard^{6}
Joel Thompson	2nd Row	(Australia) Gavin Cooper
Wade Graham	2nd Row	(Australia) Bryce Cartwright
Kyle Turner^{2}	Lock	(Cook Islands) Tepai Moeroa^{7}
Leilani Latu	Interchange	(Australia) Damien Cook
Latrell Mitchell	Interchange	(Italy) Paul Vaughan
Aidan Sezer	Interchange	(New Zealand) Sam Lisone
Tyrone Peachey	Interchange	(Australia) Mitchell Aubusson
Tyrone Roberts	Interchange	(Samoa) Sione Mata'utia
Bevan French	Interchange	(England) Jordan Turner
Chris Smith^{3}	Interchange	(England) Chris McQueen^{10}
Laurie Daley	Coach	Mal Meninga

^{1} - Will Chambers was originally selected to play but withdrew for the birth of his first child. Jack Bird was moved from the bench to Centre and Chambers was replaced by Bevan French.
^{2} - Sam Thaiday was originally selected to play but withdrew due to injury. Kyle Turner was moved from the bench to Lock and Thaiday was replaced by Tyrone Roberts.
^{3} - Adam Elliott was originally selected to play but withdrew due to injury. He was replaced by Chris Smith.
^{4} - Konrad Hurrell was originally selected to play but withdrew due to injury. He was replaced by Gerard Beale.
^{5} - Adam Reynolds was originally selected to play but withdrew due to injury. Moses Mbye was moved from the bench to Halfback and Reynolds was replaced by Damien Cook.
^{6} - Nate Myles was originally selected to play but withdrew due to injury. Reagan Campbell-Gillard was moved from the bench to Prop and Myles was replaced by Paul Vaughan.
^{7} - Jake Trbojevic was originally selected to play but withdrew due to injury. Tepai Moeroa was moved from the bench to Lock and Trbojevic was replaced by Mitchell Aubusson.
^{8} - Joseph Leilua was originally selected to play but withdrew due to injury. He was replaced by Jarrod Croker.
^{9} - Jarryd Hayne was originally selected to play but withdrew due to injury. David Mead was moved from Wing to Fullback and Hayne was replaced by Akuila Uate.
^{10} - Sosaia Feki was originally selected to play but withdrew due to injury. He was replaced by Chris McQueen.

== Result ==
10 February 2017
8:15pm AEDT

Indigenous All Stars	34 – 8	World All Stars
Tries: Jack Bird (4') 1 Blake Ferguson (7') 1 Ashley Taylor (13') 1 Johnathan Thurston (41') 1 Dane Gagai (59') 1 Leilani Latu (70') 1 Goals: Johnathan Thurston 4/5 (4', 14', 43', 60'); Aidan Sezer 1/1 (72')		Tries: David Mead (36') 1 Nene Macdonald (39') 1 Goals: Jarrod Croker 0/2

McDonald Jones Stadium
Attendance: 20,241
Preston Campbell Medal: Johnathan Thurston

== Women's All Stars match ==
2017 Women All Stars match
Indigenous Women All Stars	Women All Stars
14	4
	1	Total
IND	0	14
WAS	0	4
- Date: Friday 10 February 2017
- Stadium: McDonald Jones Stadium
- Location: Newcastle, New South Wales
- Woman of the Match: TBA
- Advance Australia Fair: TBA

Broadcast partners
- Broadcasters: National Indigenous Television
- Commentators: Hannah Hollis; Tanisha Stanton; Brad Cooke

For the sixth time, a Women's match was held as part of the fixture.

=== Women's Teams ===
INDIGENOUS WOMEN ALL STARS	Position	WOMEN ALL STARS
Casey Karklis	Fullback	Sam Hammond
Latoya Billy	Wing	Karina Brown
Tallisha Harden (c)	Centre	Annette Brander
Caitlyn Moran	Centre	Corban McGregor
Narikah Johnson	Wing	Chelsea Baker
Nakia Davis-Welsh	Five-eighth	Allana Ferguson
Jenni-Sue Hoepper	Halfback	Maddie Studdon
Rebecca Young	Prop	Steph Hancock (c)
Kelsey Parkins	Hooker	Brittany Breayley
Ashleigh Singleton	Prop	Heather Ballinger
Emma-Marie Young	2nd Row	Kezie Apps
Jasmin Allende	2nd Row	Renae Kunst
Elizabeth Cook-Black	Lock	Ruan Sims
Lauren Motlop	Interchange	Charmayne Nathan
Simone Smith	Interchange	Kody House
Lavina Phillips	Interchange	Vanessa Foliaki
Rebecca Riley	Interchange	Simaima Taufa-Kautai
Carly Phillips	Interchange	Shanice Parker
Dean Widders	Coach	Steve Folkes
