= Simon Geros =

Samoa international rugby league footballer

Personal information
- Born: Western Samoa

Playing information
- Position: Five-eighth
Club
Years	Team	Pld	T	G	FG	P
2001–16	Valley United Spartans	450	15	4	1	69
Representative
Years	Team	Pld	T	G	FG	P
2000	Samoa	2	0	2	0	4

Simon Geros is a Samoan former professional rugby league footballer who played in the 1990s, 2000s and 2010s who represented Samoa in the 2000 World Cup.

== Playing career ==
Geros played for the Burleigh Bears when in 2000 he was selected for Samoa in the World Cup. He stayed with the Bears in the 2001 Queensland Cup.

In 2002 he was part of the Northern Eagles franchise and played in the NSWRL Premier League.

He then went on to play for the Valley United Spartans where he played a club record 450 games over 15 seasons.
