= Steve Carter (rugby league) =

Australian rugby league footballer

Personal information
- Born: 22 July 1970 (age 56) Wyong, New South Wales, Australia
- Height: 181 cm (5 ft 11 in)
- Weight: 88 kg (13 st 12 lb)

Playing information
- Position: Five-eighth, Halfback
Club
Years	Team	Pld	T	G	FG	P
1988–01	Penrith Panthers	243	65	3	2	268
2002	Widnes Vikings	23	4	0	0	16
	Total	266	69	3	2	284
Representative
Years	Team	Pld	T	G	FG	P
1991–95	NSW Country Origin	3	1	0	0	4
1992	New South Wales	1	0	0	0	0

Steve Carter (born 22 July 1970) is an Australian former professional rugby league footballer who played in the 1980s, 1990s and 2000s. A New South Wales State of Origin representative five-eighth, in Australia he played for and captained the Penrith Panthers, with whom he won the 1991 NSWRL Premiership. He ended his career with a season in England with the Widnes Vikings.

== Club career ==
While attending Jamison High School, Carter played for the 1987 Australian Schoolboys.

A Wyong junior, Carter was graded by the Panthers in 1988. He primarily played in the five-eighth position. Carter was on the interchange bench for the Panthers first and unsuccessful Grand Final attempt in season 1990. He was the regular five-eighth in the 1991 Panthers outfit that clinched the club's first premiership. Following the grand final victory he travelled with the Panthers to England for the 1991 World Club Challenge which was lost to Wigan.

After the turmoil at the club which upset the 1992 season and saw a number of senior players leave, Carter took over as captain, a role he maintained throughout the 1990s. In spite of career threatening injuries and poor form he played out the 2001 series in a successful attempt to beat Royce Simmons' record of club appearances for the Panthers. Carter previously held the standing club record of 242 first grade appearances from 1991 until the 2024 finals series where he was overtaken by Isaah Yeo.

After fourteen seasons with the Panthers, Carter spent one season (2002) in the Super League with the Widnes Vikings.

== Representative career ==
Carter played representative football for two seasons. In 1991 and 1992 he was selected for Country Origin, and Carter then made one appearance off the interchange bench for New South Wales in Game II of the 1992 State of Origin series.

== Career highlights ==
- First Grade Debut: 1988 – Round 13 Penrith vs Illawarra Steelers at Penrith Stadium, 13 June
- State of Origin: 1992 – Game 2, New South Wales vs Queensland at Lang Park, 20 May
- Premierships: 1991 – Member of the Penrith Panthers Grand Final winning team
