= Josh Mansour =

Lebanon and Australia international rugby league footballer

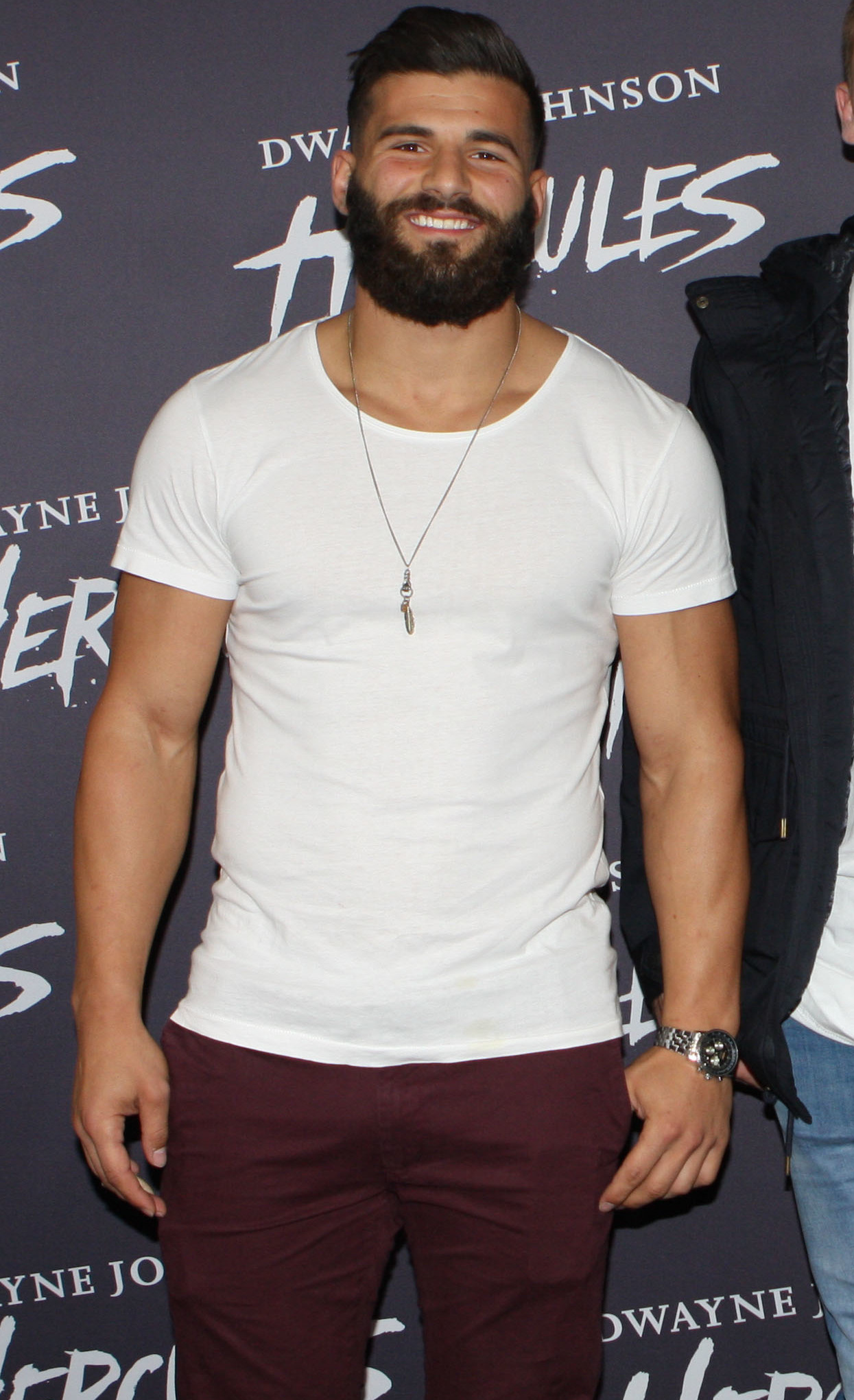

Personal information
- Full name: Joshua Mansour
- Born: 17 June 1990 (age 36) Canterbury, New South Wales, Australia
- Height: 183 cm (6 ft 0 in)
- Weight: 98 kg (15 st 6 lb)

Playing information
- Position: Wing
Club
Years	Team	Pld	T	G	FG	P
2012–20	Penrith Panthers	158	74	0	0	296
2021–22	South Sydney	16	12	0	0	48
	Total	174	86	0	0	344
Representative
Years	Team	Pld	T	G	FG	P
2009–22	Lebanon	7	5	0	0	20
2014–17	Australia	7	3	0	0	12
2014–20	Prime Minister's XIII	1	1	0	0	4
2016	NSW City	1	1	0	0	4
2016	New South Wales	3	0	0	0	0
- Source: As of 4 November 2022

Joshua Mansour (Arabic: جوش منصور; born 17 June 1990) is a former professional rugby league footballer who played as a winger. He represented Lebanon and Australia at international level.

He previously played for the Penrith Panthers and the South Sydney Rabbitohs in the National Rugby League, and for Newtown Jets in the NSW Cup. At representative level he played for the Prime Minister's XIII, NSW City Origin and New South Wales in the State of Origin series.

== Early life ==
Mansour was born in Sydney, Australia. He is of Lebanese and Cuban descent through his father, Fidel, who was born north of Beirut, Lebanon, and is of Portuguese descent through his mother, Angie, who was born in the Madeira archipelago.

He played junior rugby league for the St Johns Eagles and the Kingsgrove Colts, and attended Holy Spirit College in Lakemba during his high school years.

== Playing career ==
After being cut from the Canterbury-Bankstown Bulldogs' S. G. Ball Cup side, Mansour attended an open trial for the North Sydney Bears and was subsequently signed by the South Sydney Rabbitohs, playing in their NYC team between 2008 and 2010. Mansour was selected in 2010 as Winger of the Year NYC and was chosen as the NYC Player of the Year at the Rabbitohs.

He represented Lebanon in the 2009 European Cup, and played for the Junior Kangaroos in 2010.

Mansour graduated to South Sydney's full-time training squad in 2011, playing for their feeder team, the North Sydney Bears, in the New South Wales Cup.

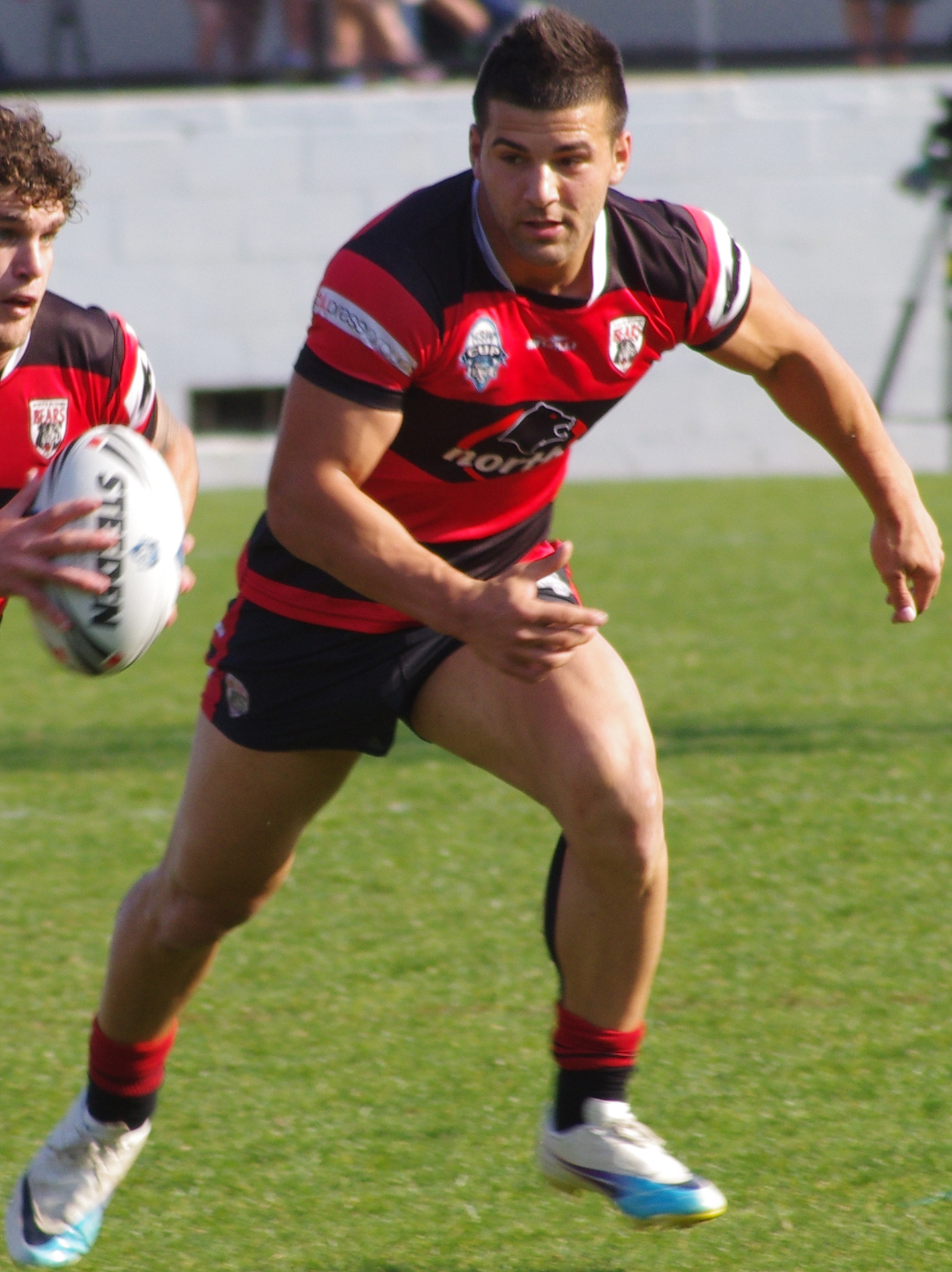
Mansour playing for the North Sydney Bears in 2011

After a number of strong performances for Norths, Mansour caught the attention of Phil Gould at the Penrith Panthers who offered him a contract for the 2012 season.

=== 2012 ===
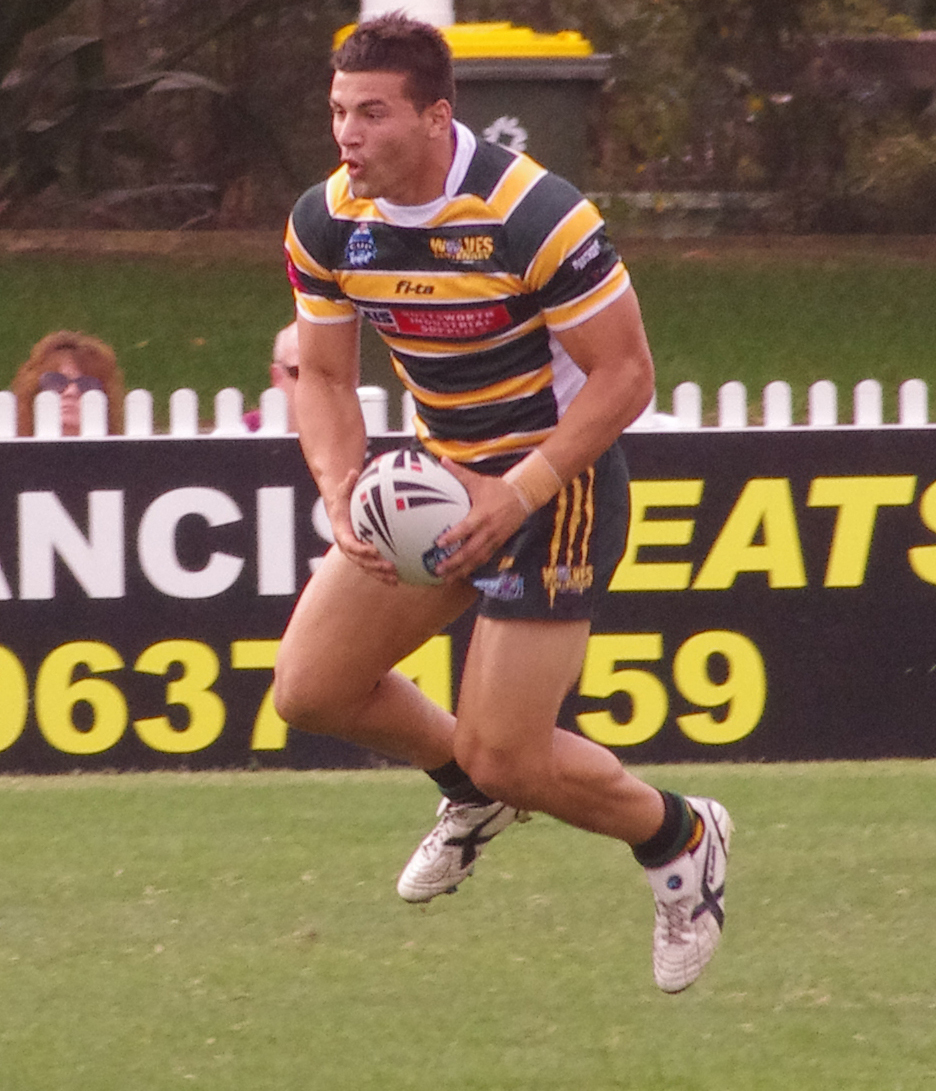
Mansour playing for the Windsor Wolves in 2012

In round 9, Mansour made his NRL debut for the Penrith Panthers at Penrith Stadium on the wing in the 10–44 loss against the Melbourne Storm. Mansour scored a try on debut. He was named the Panthers rookie of the year after playing in 14 matches and scoring 7 tries in his debut year.

=== 2013 ===
On 5 March, Mansour extended his contract with the club to the end of the 2014 season. In round 23, against the New Zealand Warriors, Mansour scored a spectacular put down of the ball just before going into the in goal in the 28–24 win at Mt Smart Stadium. Mansour played in 14 matches and scored 4 tries in 2013.

=== 2014 ===
In February, Mansour played in the Panthers inaugural Auckland Nines squad. On 3 June, he re-signed, keeping him at the Panthers until the end of the 2016 season after declining a lucrative offer from the Canberra Raiders. Mansour finished the season as the Panthers highest tryscorer with 15 tries in 22 matches.

On 12 October, Mansour played on the wing and scored a try for Prime Minister's XIII in the 34–16 win over Papua New Guinea.

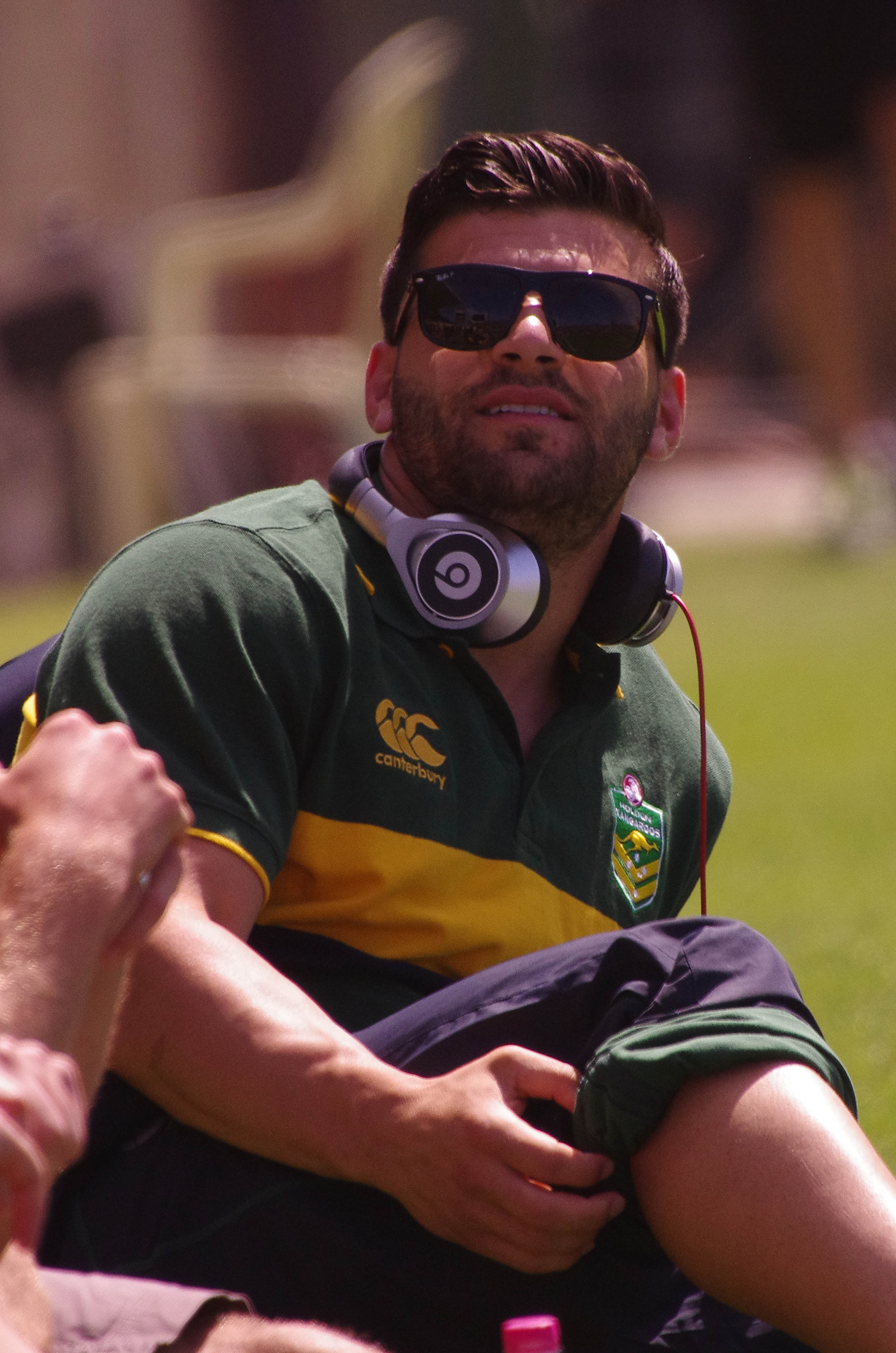
Mansour on international duty with the Kangaroos in 2014

He made his Australian international debut against New Zealand national rugby league team on 25 October in the Four Nations, where the Kiwis won 30–12 at Suncorp Stadium. Mansour scored his first try in the green and gold of Australia against Samoa in Australia's 44–18 victory at WIN Stadium, and played in the 22–18 Four Nations final loss against New Zealand.

=== 2015 ===
Mansour scored 6 tries from 12 games in 2015. He was named in the Lebanon 48-man train-on squad ahead of two 2017 Rugby League World Cup qualifiers against South Africa, however he didn't take part in either match.

=== 2016 ===
In February, Mansour played in the Panthers Auckland Nines. On 8 May, he played for NSW City Origin against Country, scoring a try in the 44–30 win, and was soon after rewarded with selection in the New South Wales State of Origin squad. On 1 June, Mansour made his debut for New South Wales against Queensland, playing on the wing in the 4–6 loss at ANZ Stadium. Mansour featured in all 3 matches for Blues on the wing in their 2–1 series loss in the 2016 State of Origin series. At the 2016 Dally M Awards night, Mansour was awarded as the Winger of the Year. Mansour finished the season with 25 matches and being the Panthers highest try-scorer with 16 tries. At the end of the year, Mansour was named in the Australian 2016 Four Nations 24-man squad. Mansour played in one match of the tournament, in the first round against Scotland, where he played on the wing and scored 2 tries in the 54–12 win at Craven Park in Hull. On 3 November, Mansour suffered a serious knee injury during a freak mishap at training during a game of touch footy when he collided with Dragons star Josh Dugan, ruling Mansour from the tournament and the first half of the 2017 season.

=== 2017 ===
On 4 June 2017, Mansour played his first game for the season after returning from a serious knee injury. He scored a try in Penrith's 38–0 demolition of Canterbury at Stadium Australia. On 2 September 2017, Mansour played his 100th NRL game against the Manly Warringah Sea Eagles. At the end of the season, Mansour was chosen in The Australian squad for The 2017 Rugby League World Cup. Mansour played in a match against France and then played in the match against Lebanon where he marked up against lookalike Abbas Miski. Australia went on to win The 2017 World Cup but Mansour did not feature in the final.

=== 2018 ===
Mansour started the season well for Penrith until suffering a shocking facial injury in Round 6 against the Gold Coast Titans when he was accidentally kneed in the face by Gold Coast winger Anthony Don. After having surgery on his badly fractured face, Mansour said "The biggest risk was obviously losing my eye, My surgeon has done over 2000 people and he reckons he has only seen a dozen like this, and they are all from motor accidents and soldiers". On 17 April, Mansour signed a three-year contract extension to stay at Penrith until the end of the 2021 season.

=== 2019 ===
Mansour started the 2019 NRL season as one of the club's first choice wingers. Mansour scored his first try of the season in Round 5 against the Gold Coast in a 30–24 defeat. On 14 May 2019, Mansour was demoted to reserve grade by coach Ivan Cleary as Penrith had only won 2 out of 9 matches to start the season.

Mansour only spent the 1 week in reserve grade for Penrith before being recalled back to the first team. Mansour subsequently played on the wing as Penrith defeated Parramatta 16–10 at the new Western Sydney Stadium.

Mansour made a total of 19 appearances for Penrith in the 2019 NRL season and scored one try as the club finished 10th on the table and missed out on the finals for the first time since 2015.

=== 2020 ===
In round 4 of the 2020 NRL season, Mansour scored his first try in 14 months as Penrith defeated the New Zealand Warriors 26–0 at the Campbelltown Sports Ground.

In round 15, Mansour played his 150th first grade game and scored two tries as Penrith defeated Cronulla-Sutherland 38–12 at Penrith Stadium.

Mansour played a total of 22 games and scored 12 tries for Penrith in the 2020 NRL season as the club claimed the Minor Premiership and reached the 2020 NRL Grand Final. Mansour played on the wing for Penrith in the final and scored a try in the first half which was disallowed when the score was 6–0 in Melbourne's favour.

In the second half, Mansour scored a try but it wasn't enough for Penrith who lost 26–20.

On 8 November, Mansour was informed by the Penrith club that he could seek an early release from his contract after learning that he would not be required for the 2021 season. Mansour told Fairfax Media columnist Danny Weidler he was summoned to meet Penrith coach Ivan Cleary and football manager Matt Cameron at a Homebush restaurant 48 hours after Penrith's grand-final loss to Melbourne where he was informed of the news.

=== 2021 ===
On 13 January, Mansour signed a two-year deal to join South Sydney.

In round 1 of the 2021 NRL season, he made his debut for Souths in a 26–18 loss against Melbourne.

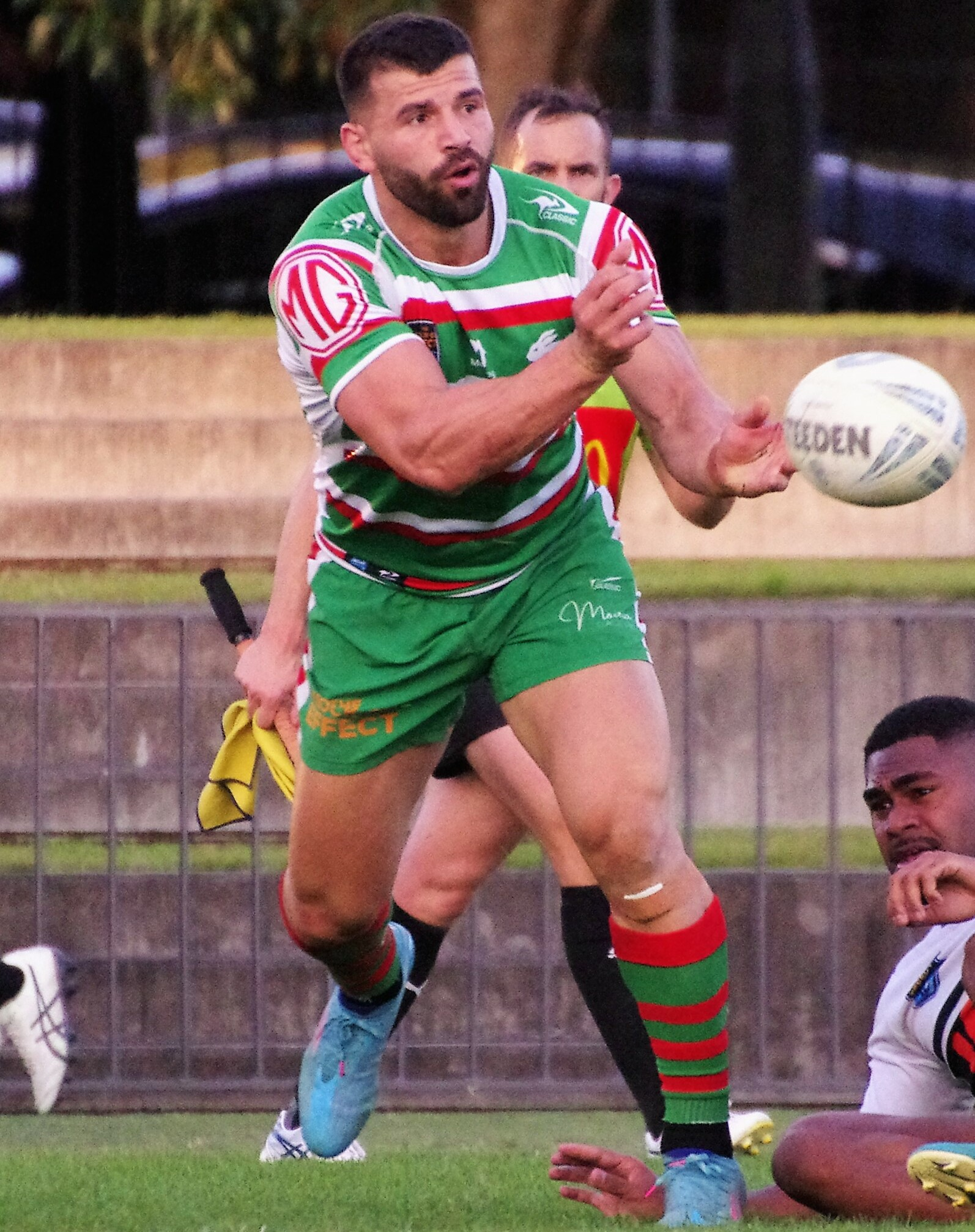
Mansour playing for the Rabbitohs in 2022

After being demoted to reserve grade before round 2, Mansour was recalled to the Souths squad for round 3. Mansour scored his first official try for Souths in a 26–16 victory over arch rivals the Sydney Roosters.

In round 19, Mansour scored two tries for South Sydney in a 60–22 victory over the New Zealand Warriors.

In round 21, he scored two tries in a 40–12 victory over Parramatta.

The following week, Mansour scored another two tries for South Sydney in their 36–6 victory over the Gold Coast.

On 24 August, Mansour was ruled out for the rest of the season after suffering a knee injury in South Sydney's round 23 loss against Penrith.

=== 2022 ===
Mansour was limited to only five games for South Sydney in the 2022 NRL season where he scored two tries.

In the opening group stage match of the 2021 Rugby League World Cup, Mansour scored the opening try for Lebanon in their 34–12 loss against New Zealand. In the final group stage match, Mansour scored a hat-trick in Lebanon's 74–12 victory over Jamaica.

On 1 November, Mansour was released by the South Sydney club.

=== 2023 ===
On 19 February, Mansour played for Newtown in a pre-season trial against Canterbury at the Belmore Sports Ground. On 28 February, Mansour joined Newtown for the 2023 season as a free agent. On 21 November, Mansour announced his retirement via Instagram.

=== 2024 ===
On 18 March, Mansour publicly criticised South Sydney head coach Jason Demetriou on the Bye Round podcast hosted by James Graham. Mansour went on to say "I didn't see eye-to-eye with the coach, which was a shame ... we just didn't have a good rapport, "I feel like every time he spoke to me he didn't live up to what he was saying and I let it get to me. I'm a man of my word, I was holding him to every conversation we had. I was so frustrated that final year". Mansour also claimed he was getting mixed messages from Demetriou and also accused him of being dishonest. Mansour gave an example of when he was allegedly told by Demetriou that he was going to be picked for a game but then not selected. Mansour also alleged that during South Sydney's end of season team meeting he was shown on a screen of leaving players without knowing any of this information. Mansour went on to say "We get to the end of the year, we're in the video room and they said 'we're going to put in a little farewell video for the guys that are leaving and want to thank them for their time' ... and I was the first one there, "I didn't even know that I was leaving. I was the first one on the clip. I wasn't surprised with all the stuff that happened before. But yeah, it was a very sad time to leave Souths unfortunately".

== Statistics ==
Year	Team	Games	Tries	Pts
2012	Penrith Panthers	14	7	28
2013	Penrith Panthers	14	4	16
2014	Penrith Panthers	22	15	60
2015	Penrith Panthers	12	6	24
2016	Penrith Panthers	25	16	64
2017	Penrith Panthers	15	5	20
2018	Penrith Panthers	15	8	32
2019	Penrith Panthers	19	1	4
2020	Penrith Panthers	22	12	48
2021	South Sydney Rabbitohs	11	10	40
2022	South Sydney Rabbitohs	5	2	8
	Totals	174	86	344

== Personal life ==
Mansour's wife, Daniella, gave birth to their first child, Siana, on 2 November 2017. Their second child, Andre, was born on 31 July 2019.

Mansour is a fan of Arsenal F.C.

Mansour is founder and co-owner of a podcast and YouTube show called Let’s Trot Show.
