= Tyrone Peachey =

Australian rugby league footballer

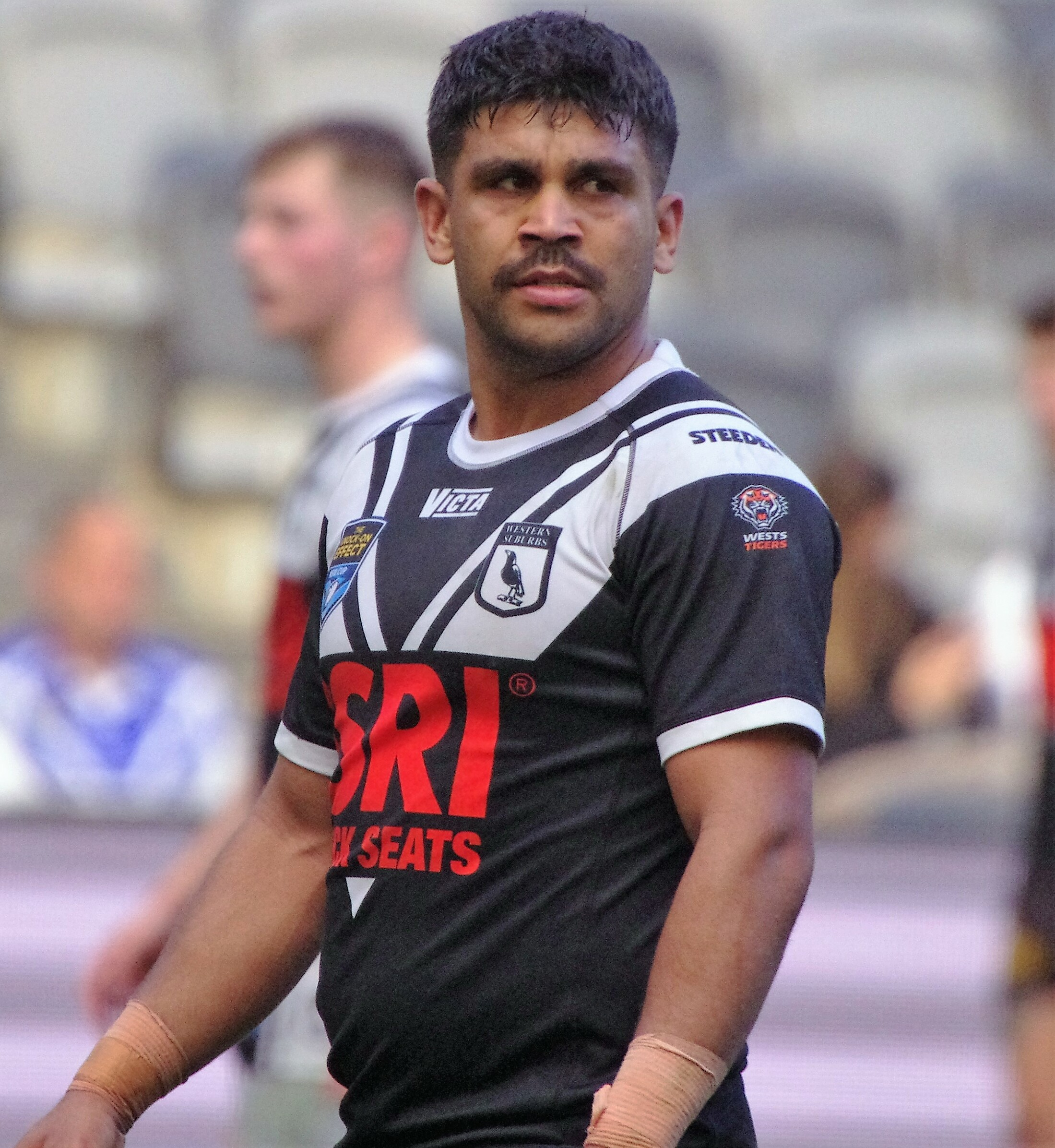

Personal information
- Born: 8 August 1991 (age 35) Wellington, New South Wales, Australia
- Height: 183 cm (6 ft 0 in)
- Weight: 93 kg (14 st 9 lb)

Playing information
- Position: Centre, Five-eighth, Lock
Club
Years	Team	Pld	T	G	FG	P
2013	Cronulla Sharks	7	1	0	0	4
2014–18	Penrith Panthers	109	40	0	0	160
2019–21	Gold Coast Titans	63	8	6	0	40
2022	Wests Tigers	13	1	0	0	4
2023–24	Penrith Panthers	17	10	0	0	40
	Total	209	60	6	0	248
Representative
Years	Team	Pld	T	G	FG	P
2015–24	Indigenous All Stars	7	0	0	0	0
2015–17	NSW City	3	0	0	0	0
2018	Prime Minister's XIII	1	0	0	0	0
2018	New South Wales	3	0	0	0	0
- Source: As of 1 June 2024
- Relatives: David Peachey (uncle)

Tyrone Peachey (born 8 August 1991) is an Australian former professional rugby league footballer.

He previously played for the Cronulla-Sutherland Sharks, Gold Coast Titans, Wests Tigers, and the Penrith Panthers in the NRL, winning the 2023 NRL Grand Final with Penrith. He played for the Indigenous All Stars, City Origin, Prime Minister's XIII and New South Wales. Peachey played in almost every position in his career, with most starts coming from the bench while having started games at centre, five-eighth, lock, second-row, fullback, hooker (listed in order of most starts) with lock considered his best position.

== Background ==
Peachey was born in Wellington, New South Wales, Australia. He is an Indigenous Australian and the nephew of former Cronulla-Sutherland Sharks and South Sydney Rabbitohs player David Peachey. He went to Cronulla High School in Sydney’s South and graduated in 2009.

Tyrone played his junior rugby league for Wellington Cowboys and Cronulla-Caringbah Sharks.

== Playing career ==
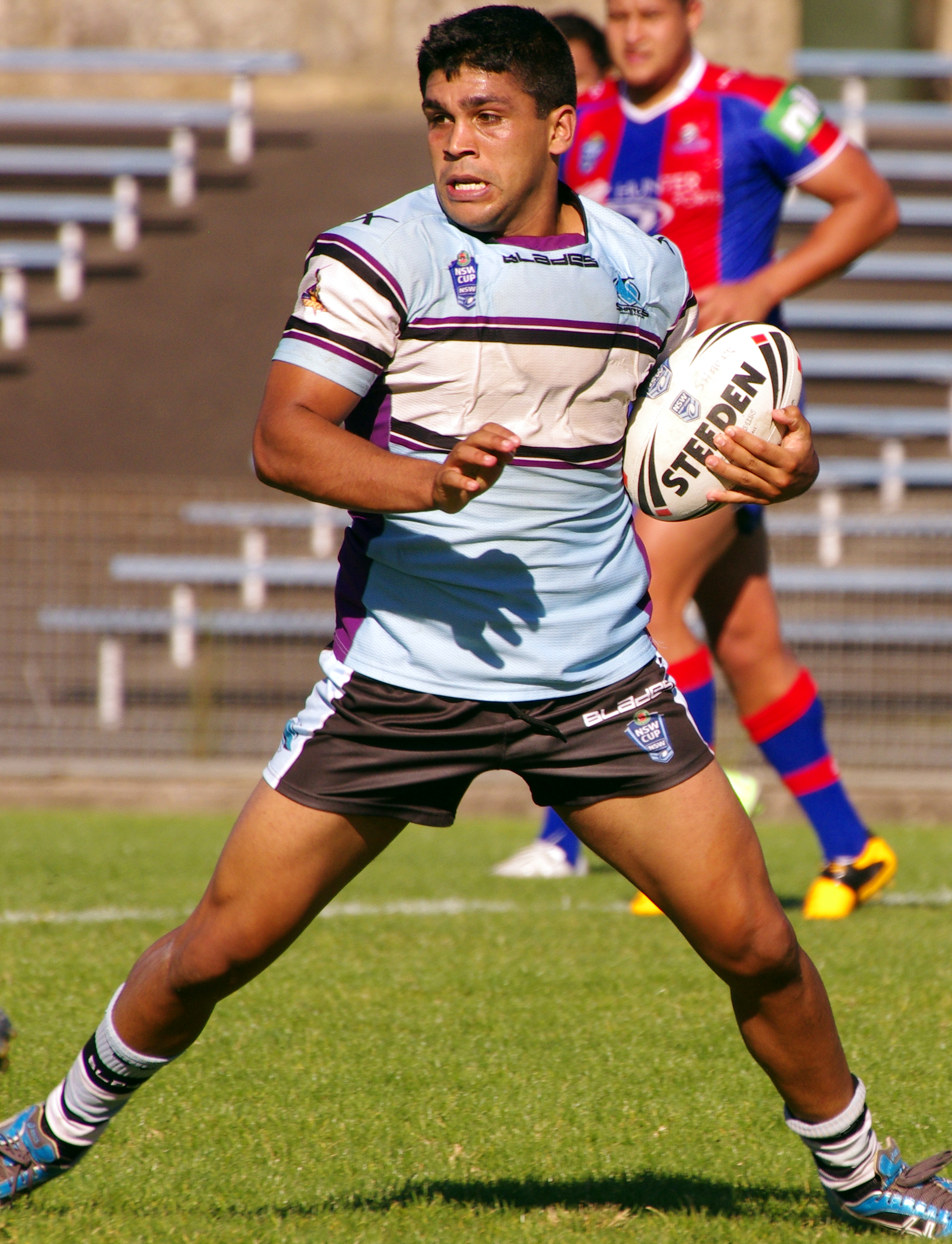
Peachey playing for the Sharks in 2013

He played his junior football for the Brother and Cronulla-Caringbah Sharks, before being signed by the Cronulla-Sutherland Sharks.

Peachey played for the Sharks' NYC team in 2010 and 2011. At the end of 2011, Peachey was named at lock in the 2011 NYC Team of the Year. In 2012, Peachey graduated into the Sharks NSW Cup team.

=== 2013 ===
In Round 10 of the 2013 NRL season, Peachey made his NRL debut for the Cronulla-Sutherland Sharks against the Canberra Raiders, playing off the interchange bench in the 30–20 win against the Canberra Raiders at Shark Park. On 17 June 2013, Peachey signed a two-year deal with the Penrith Panthers from the 2014 season. In Round 26 against the Canberra Raiders, Peachey scored his first NRL career try in his last match for Cronulla-Sutherland in the 38–18 win at Canberra Stadium. Peachey finished his debut year in the NRL with him playing in seven matches and scoring one try for Cronulla-Sutherland in the 2013 NRL season. On 22 September 2013, Peachey was named at lock in the 2013 NSW Cup team of the year. On 6 October 2013, Peachey played in the NSW Cup Grand Final against the Windsor Wolves, playing at lock and scoring a try in the 36–8 win.

=== 2014 ===
In February, Peachey was selected in Penrith's inaugural Auckland Nines squad. In Round 1, he made his club debut for the Penrith club against the Newcastle Knights, playing off the interchange bench in the 30–8 win at Penrith Stadium. In Round 12, against the Parramatta Eels, he scored his first and second tries for the Penrith Panthers in the 38–12 win at Penrith Stadium. Peachey's strong start to the season finished in Round 18 after he suffered a pectoral-tear injury. Peachey finished off his debut year with the Penrith club with him playing in 14 matches and scoring three tries in 2014 NRL season.

=== 2015 ===
On 13 February, Peachey played at second-row for the Indigenous All Stars against the NRL All Stars in the 2015 All Stars match at Cbus Super Stadium, the Indigenous side winning 20–6.

On 3 May, he played for New South Wales City against New South Wales Country, playing at lock in City's 22–34 loss at Wagga Wagga.

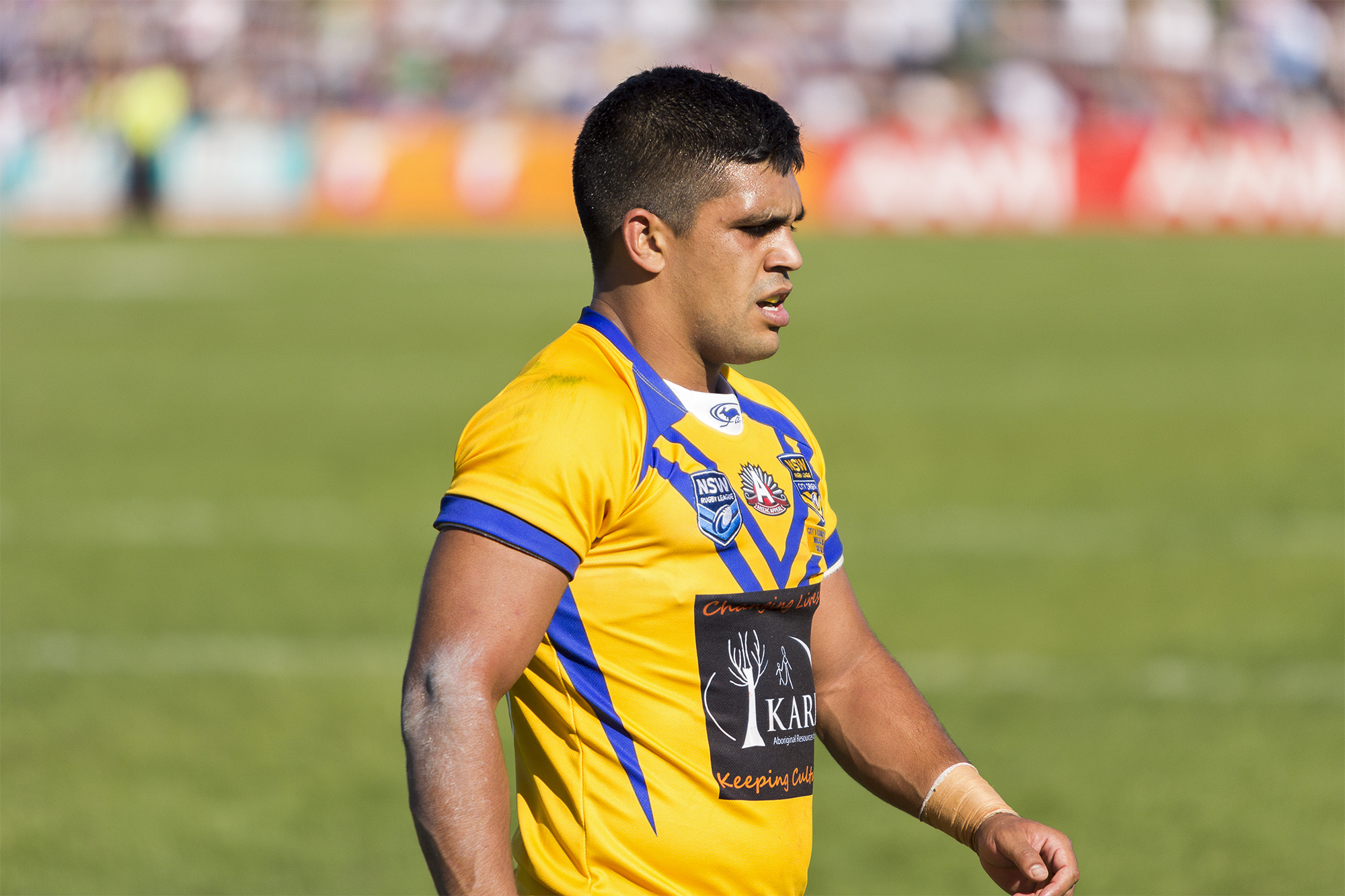
Peachey playing for City in the City v Country in Wagga Wagga in 2015

He finished off the 2015 season having played in 22 matches and scoring five tries for the Penrith Panthers.

On 15 December, he was named on the interchange bench for the Indigenous All Stars team to play against the World All Stars on 13 February 2016.

=== 2016 ===
On 13 February, Peachey again played for the Indigenous All Stars against the new World All Stars in the 2016 All Stars match, playing off the interchange bench in the 12–8 loss at Suncorp Stadium.

On 8 May, he played for City Origin against Country Origin, where he started at lock in the 44–30 win in Tamworth.

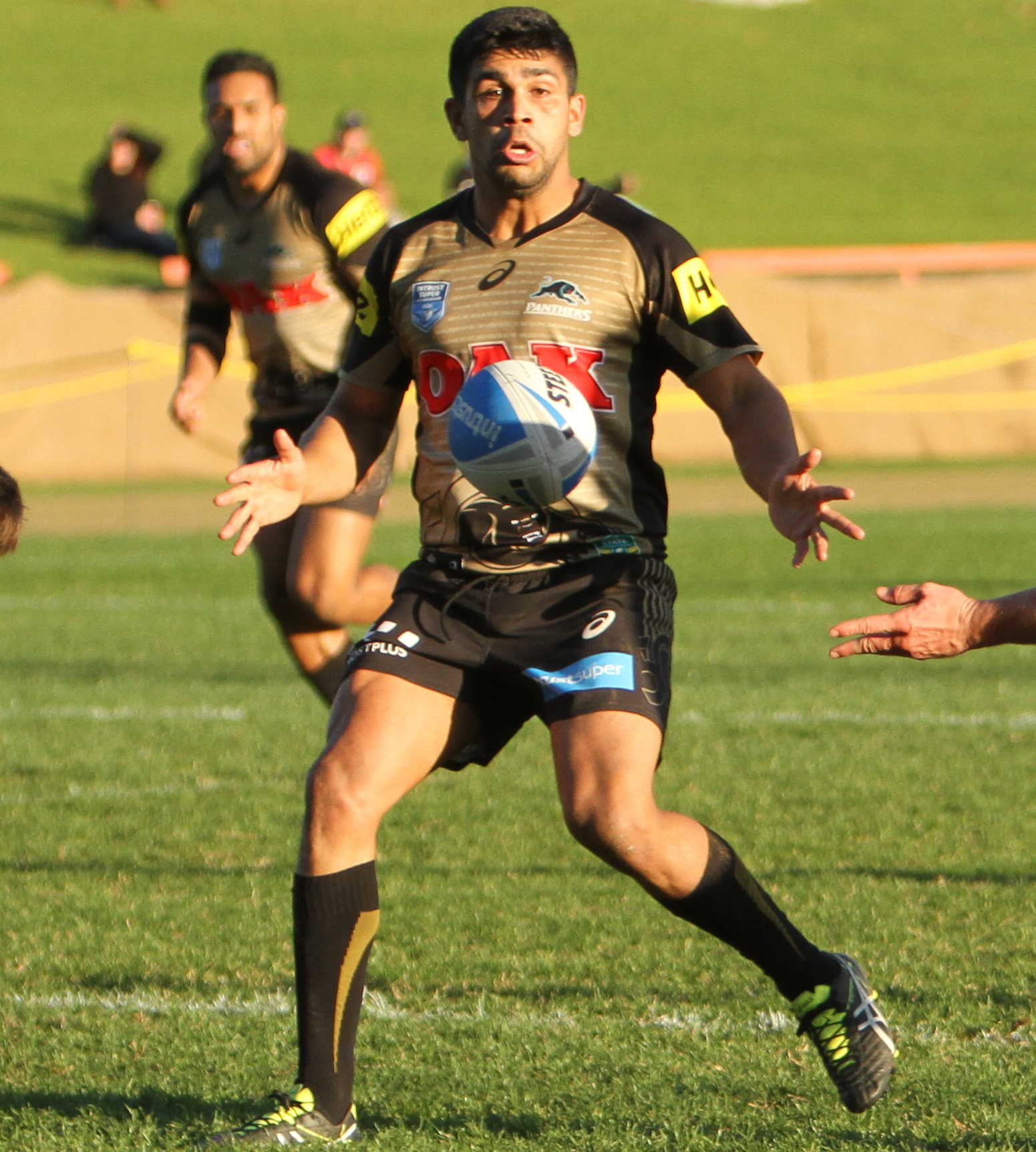
Peachey playing for the Penrith Panthers in 2016

In round 10, against the New Zealand Warriors, he scored a hat-trick of tries in the 30–18 win at AMI Stadium. In the next match, in Round 11 against the Gold Coast Titans, with scores at 24-all, Peachey went from hero to zero after he dropped a pass from Peter Wallace and didn't dive on the ball. Gold Coast halfback Ashley Taylor picked up the ball and raced downfield before Anthony Don acrobatically dived over in the corner one play later to seal a bizarre 28–24 win at Penrith Stadium. In July 2016, Peachey was axed from the Penrith squad for their Round 18 clash with the Cronulla-Sutherland Sharks after he returned training late after a night out in Cronulla. Peachey had planned to head back to Penrith in the morning but slept in and attempted to make it to training on time by catching a taxi with the trip costing him $250 and arriving in the clothes he was wearing the night before with no training gear. He eventually played in the Panthers NSW Cup team for the week. Peachey returned in the next match, playing at centre and scoring a try in the 22–18 win. After Peta Hiku and Dean Whare suffered season ending knee injuries at the start of the season, Peachey was shifted from being a bench utility to centre. Peachey finished the 2016 NRL season with him playing in 24 matches and scoring 13 tries for the Penrith club.

=== 2017 ===
On 10 February 2017, Peachey played for the Indigenous All Stars against the World All Stars in the 2017 All Stars match, playing off the interchange bench in the 34–8 win at Hunter Stadium. On 7 May 2017, Peachey again played for City Origin in the last City vs Country Origin fixture, playing at centre in the 20–10 win in Mudgee. In Penrith's Week 1 Elimination Final match against the Manly-Warringah Sea Eagles at Sydney Football Stadium, Peachey scored a controversial try when the scores where locked at 10–10 all in the 73rd minute. The ball appeared to bounce off Peachey's arm into his hand from a rebound off a grubber kick from teammate Bryce Cartwright, dived over the try line which was given the green light by the video referee bunker and Penrith would be 22–10 winners and advance into Week 2 of the finals series. Peachey finished the 2017 NRL season with him playing in 25 matches and scoring 8 tries for the Penrith club.

=== 2018 ===
On 2 March 2018, Peachey announced that he signed a three-year deal with the Gold Coast Titans worth $1.5 million, starting from 2019. In round 8 of the 2018 NRL season against the Canterbury-Bankstown Bulldogs, Peachey played his 100th NRL game in Penrith's 22–14 win at Penrith Stadium. He was selected on the bench for New South Wales for all three games of the 2018 State of Origin series.

=== 2019 ===
Peachey made a total of 21 appearances for the Gold Coast in the 2019 NRL season as the club endured a horror year on and off the field. During the halfway mark of the season, head coach Garth Brennan was sacked by the club after a string of poor results. The Gold Coast managed to win only 4 games for the entire season and finished last claiming the Wooden Spoon.

=== 2020 ===
Peachey played 20 games for the Gold Coast in the 2020 NRL season as the club finished ninth on the table and missed out on the finals.

=== 2021 ===
In the 2021 Finals Series, Peachey was sent to the sin bin and later missed a field goal attempt in the Gold Coast's 25–24 loss against the Sydney Roosters which ended their season. On 14 September, he was released by the Gold Coast club. On 8 October, Peachey signed a two-year deal to join the Wests Tigers.

=== 2022 ===
Peachey played a total of 13 matches for the Wests Tigers in the 2022 NRL season as the club finished bottom of the table and claimed the Wooden Spoon for the first time. On 20 October, Peachey joined former club and reigning premiers Penrith in a swap deal with Charlie Staines.

=== 2023 ===
In round 5 of the 2023 NRL season, Peachey made his second club debut for Penrith against Canberra. Peachey scored a try in Penrith's 53–12 victory.

Peachey would be the 18th man in Penrith's 2023 NRL Grand Final victory over Brisbane, winning his first premiership ring. Peachey re-signed with the club on a one-year deal.

=== 2024 ===
On 24 February, Peachey played in Penrith's 2024 World Club Challenge final loss against Wigan. On 25 June, Peachey announced his retirement from rugby league. On 28 November, Peachey had signed a one-year deal to play in the Queensland Cup to play with the Burleigh Bears.

== Statistics ==
Year	Team	Games	Tries	Goals	Pts
2013	Cronulla-Sutherland	7	1		4
2014	Penrith	14	3		12
2015	Penrith	22	5		20
2016	Penrith	24	13		52
2017	Penrith	25	8		32
2018	Penrith	24	11		44
2019	Gold Coast Titans	21	2	6	20
2020	Gold Coast Titans	20	1		4
2021	Gold Coast Titans	22	5		20
2022	Wests Tigers	13	1		4
2023	Penrith	15	10		40
2024	Penrith	2			
	Totals	209	60	6	248
