= Leilani Latu =

Tonga international rugby league player (born 1993)

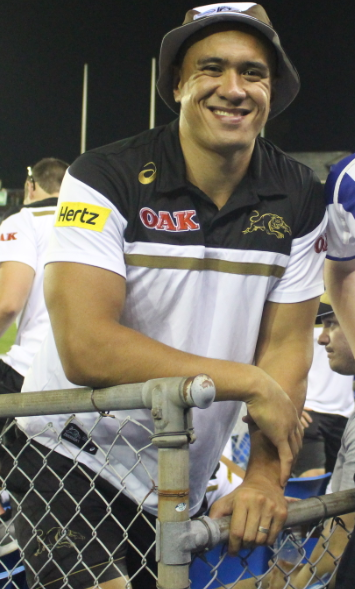

Personal information
- Full name: Leilani Latu
- Born: 5 February 1993 (age 33) Sydney, New South Wales, Australia
- Height: 6 ft 3 in (1.90 m)
- Weight: 17 st 9 lb (112 kg)

Playing information
- Position: Prop
Club
Years	Team	Pld	T	G	FG	P
2015–17	Penrith Panthers	49	6	0	0	24
2018–19	Gold Coast Titans	9	0	0	0	0
2020–21	Warrington Wolves	3	1	0	0	4
2020(loan)	→ Widnes Vikings	1	0	0	0	0
	Total	62	7	0	0	28
Representative
Years	Team	Pld	T	G	FG	P
2015	NSW Residents	1	0	0	0	0
2016–18	Indigenous All Stars	3	2	0	0	8
2016	NSW City	1	0	0	0	0
2017	Tonga	1	2	0	0	8
- Source: As of 9 January 2024

Leilani Latu (born 5 February 1993) is a Tonga international rugby league footballer who played as a prop most recently for the Warrington Wolves in the Super League.

Latu has spent time on loan from Warrington at the Widnes Vikings in the Championship and has played for the Penrith Panthers and the Gold Coast Titans in the NRL. He has played at representative level for the Indigenous All Stars and NSW City.

== Background ==
Latu was born in Sydney, New South Wales, Australia.

He is of Tongan, Italian and Torres Strait Islander descent. He spent his junior years playing for the Leichhardt Juniors when then he switched over to play in Lakemba for the St Johns Eagles. He played his junior rugby league for St. John Eagles, Lakemba, before being signed by the Canterbury-Bankstown Bulldogs.

== Playing career ==
=== Early career ===
In 2011, Latu captained the Canterbury-Bankstown Bulldogs to the grand final of the S. G. Ball Cup, before moving into their National Youth Competition team, where he stayed until 2012. In 2013, he graduated to the Bulldogs' New South Wales Cup team.

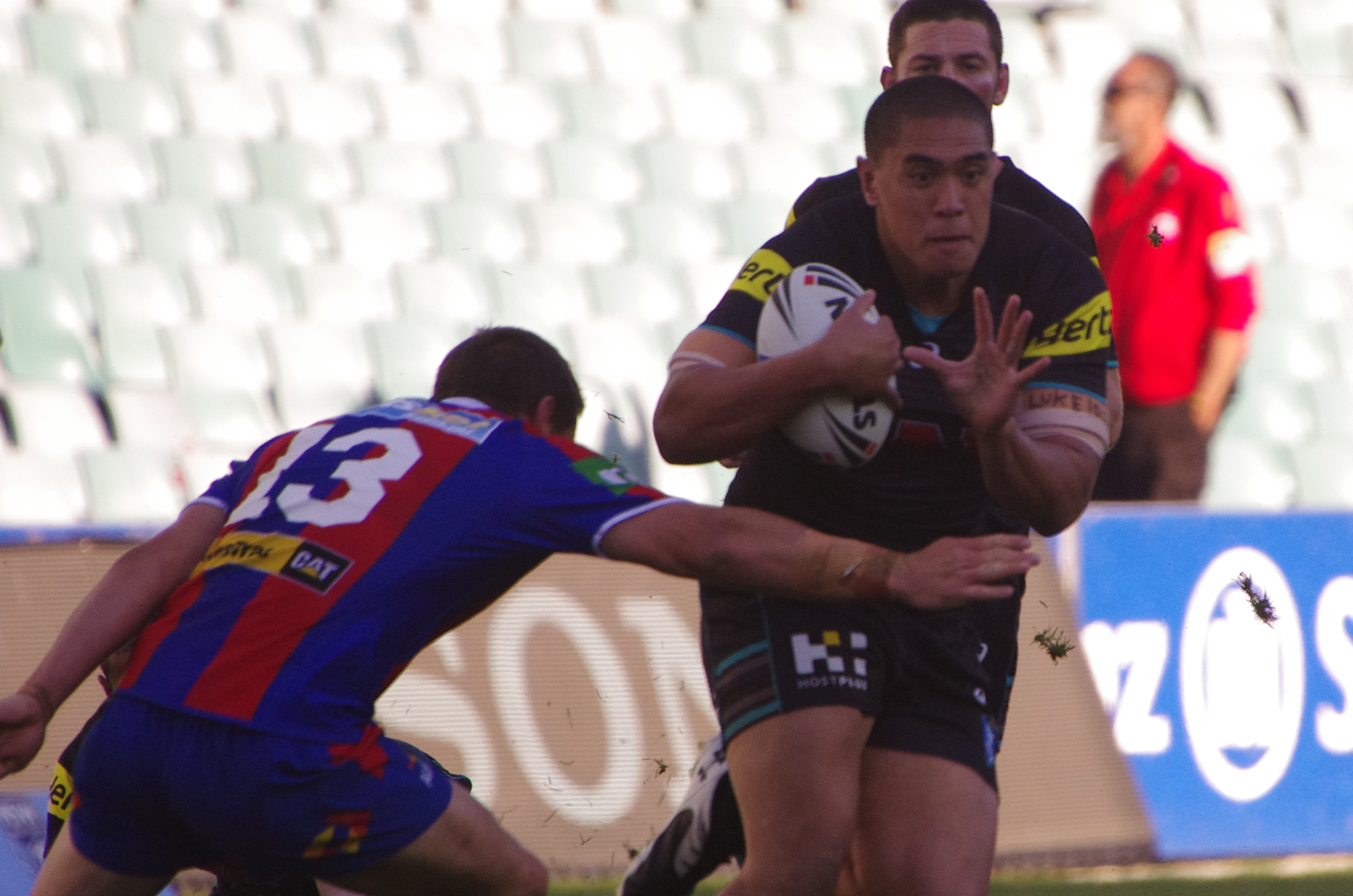
Latu playing for the Panthers in 2014

In 2014, he joined the Penrith Panthers on a 2-year contract.

=== 2015 ===
On 3 May, Latu played for the New South Wales Residents against the Queensland Residents. In Round 21 of the 2015 NRL season, he made his NRL debut for the Panthers against the South Sydney Rabbitohs. On 14 September, he re-signed with the Panthers on a 2-year contract until the end of 2017. On 27 September, he was named at lock in the 2015 New South Wales Cup Team of the Year. On 9 October, Latu was named to make his international debut for Tonga in their 2017 World Cup qualifying match against the Cook Islands, though he was replaced by 18th man David Fifita in a late change.

=== 2016 ===
On 13 February, Latu played for the Indigenous All Stars against the World All Stars, playing off the interchange bench and scoring a try i his team's 8-12 loss at Suncorp Stadium. On 20 July, he extended his contract with the Panthers from the end of 2017 until the end of 2020.

=== 2017 ===
On 10 February 2017, Latu played for the Indigenous All Stars against the World All Stars in the 2017 All Stars match, coming off the interchange bench in the 34-8 win at Hunter Stadium. On 6 May 2017, Latu made his international debut for Tonga, scoring 2 tries in their 2017 Pacific Test against Fiji.

=== 2018 ===
Latu made his debut for the Gold Coast in round 1 of the 2018 NRL season against Canberra which ended in a 30-28 victory. Latu made a total of 6 appearances for the Gold Coast as the club finished in 14th position on the table.

=== 2019 ===
Latu was limited to only three games for the Gold Coast in the 2019 NRL season as the club endured a horror year on and off the field which saw them finish last on the table.

=== 2020 ===
On 21 January, Latu signed a two-year deal to join English Super League side Warrington.

=== 2021 ===
On 10 Feb 2021 it was announced that Leilani was leaving Warrington by mutual consent
