= Mark O'Halloran (rugby league) =

US international rugby league footballer

Personal information
- Full name: Mark O'Halloran
- Born: 6 March 1981 (age 45) Sydney, New South Wales, Australia
- Height: 189 cm (6 ft 2 in)
- Weight: 97 kg (15 st 4 lb)

Playing information
- Position: Centre, Wing
Club
Years	Team	Pld	T	G	FG	P
2001–03	Wests Tigers	28	6	0	0	24
2004–05	London Broncos	42	12	0	0	40
2006–014	Penrith Panthers	176	61	0	0	244
	Total	246	79	0	0	308
Representative
Years	Team	Pld	T	G	FG	P
2007	USA	1	0	0	0	0
- Source: As of 18 June 2026

Mark O'Halloran (born 6 March 1981) is a former professional rugby league footballer who played for the Wests Tigers and the Penrith Panthers in the NRL, and the London Broncos in the ESL. His junior club was Burwood United in the Balmain District Competition. O'Halloran's position of choice was as a centre although he had also played as a wing, a defensive second rower, and briefly played five eighth in the English Super league.

== Background ==
O'Halloran was born in Sydney, New South Wales, Australia.

== Playing career ==
O'Halloran made his NRL début for Wests Tigers in 2001 and played 28 first grade games, mostly as a centre. In 2004, O'Halloran moved to England, where he played in the Super League for the London Broncos.

O'Halloran returned to Australia from England and played for the Penrith Panthers in the NRL.

O'Halloran played in the USA international team having played one game in 2007.

== Post-playing ==
Since retiring, O'Halloran has become a PD/H/PE teacher and currently works at St Patrick's College, Strathfield.
