= Fred Petersen (rugby league) =

Samoa international rugby league footballer

Personal information
- Full name: Fred Petersen
- Born: 27 March 1978 (age 48) Western Samoa
- Height: 188 cm (6 ft 2 in)
- Weight: 91 kg (14 st 5 lb)

Playing information
- Position: Wing, Second-row
Club
Years	Team	Pld	T	G	FG	P
1996–01	Penrith Panthers	15	1	0	0	4
2003	Sydney Roosters	2	0	0	0	0
	Total	17	1	0	0	4
Representative
Years	Team	Pld	T	G	FG	P
2000	Samoa	1	0	0	0	0
- Source: As of 23 January 2019

Fred Petersen is a Samoan former professional rugby league footballer who played in the 1990s and 2000s. Petersen also represented Samoa in the 2000 World Cup.

== Playing career ==
Petersen played for the Penrith Panthers between 1996 and 2001, playing in 15 National Rugby League matches. He played for the Junior Kiwis in 1997. In 2000 he was named in the Samoan squad for the World Cup. During the first match against Ireland he was concussed and he did not play in another match in the competition.

He joined the Sydney City Roosters in 2003 and played in two first grade matches for the club. In 2004 he joined the Parramatta Eels but spent the season in the NSWRL Premier League.
