= Brian Leauma =

Samoa international rugby league footballer

Personal information
- Born: 11 July 1979 (age 47) Western Samoa
- Height: 180 cm (5 ft 11 in)
- Weight: 93 kg (14 st 9 lb)

Playing information

Rugby league
- Position: Wing
Club
Years	Team	Pld	T	G	FG	P
1998	Penrith Panthers	1	0	0	0	0
Representative
Years	Team	Pld	T	G	FG	P
2000	Samoa	4	1	0	0	4

Rugby union
Club
Years	Team	Pld	T	G	FG	P
2001	Waratahs

Brian Leauma (born 11 July 1978) is a Samoan former professional rugby league and rugby union footballer who represented Samoa in rugby league at the 2000 World Cup.

== Playing career ==
Leauma attended Lithgow High in Lithgow, New South Wales. In 1995 and 1996 he played for the Australian Schoolboy's.

In 1997 Leauma played for the Junior Kiwis.

In 1998 Leauma played one National Rugby League game for the Penrith Panthers.

He was named in the Samoan squad for the 2000 World Cup, and played in all four matches for Samoa.

In 2001 Leauma switched to rugby union, and played for the New South Wales Waratahs.
