= History of the Penrith Panthers =

The history of the Penrith Panthers stretches back to the 1960s when a team from Penrith entering Sydney's elite competition was first mooted. After admission to the NSWRFL premiership in 1967, the club struggled on-field until reaching the finals for the first time in the 1980s, and reaching the grand final in the 1990s. The Panthers were a part of 1997's Super League competition before continuing in the re-unified NRL competition. The panthers have won six premierships in their history in 1991, 2003, and 4 premierships straight between 2021 and 2024.

== 1960s ==
Various Penrith rugby league teams had played for many years between 1912 and 1966 in the Western Districts League under the control of the Western Suburbs RLFC, in the Parramatta competition after Parramatta was admitted to the NSWRL in 1947, and also in a second-tier Sydney competition introduced by the NSWRFL in 1962. By this time a single top level rugby league team had emerged in the Penrith area and in 1964 they became known as the Penrith Panthers. The Panther had been chosen as the Penrith emblem after a public competition won by a graphic artist from Emu Plains named Deidre Copeland.

In 1966 word was out that the New South Wales Rugby Football League would introduce two new teams to the Sydney premiership for the 1967 season. There were three teams vying for the two proposed slots, Penrith, Cronulla-Sutherland, and the Wentworthville Magpies. Cronulla-Sutherland had been assured of one place, leaving Penrith and Wentworthville to fight it out for the other place. The NSWRL eventually settled on Penrith due to their location and a win in the 1966 Second Division title. The team played its first pre-season trial against Cronulla-Sutherland on 24 February. Penrith won 18–12 in front of a crowd of 18,768.

The first premiership team was: Bill Tonkin, Bob Landers, David Applebee, Ern Gillon, Wayne Peckham, Maurie Raper, Laurie Fagan, Tony Brown (captain), Wal Crust, Bill McCall, Geoff Waldie, Barry Harris and Ron Workman. They played their first premiership match was against Canterbury on 2 April and Penrith led 12-10 until the final 15 minutes. Canterbury won 15–12.

On 23 April 1967 Penrith Park was officially opened with a match between the Panthers and the reigning premiers, St George. The Panthers won 24–12 in front of 12,201 spectators.

Penrith finished the season in 11th place, with 12 points from five wins, two draws and 11 losses. In 1968 under new captain coach Bob Boland, the team showed improvement. Penrith surprised everyone by winning the pre-season competition, the Wills Cup, and finished in 8th place. It was hoped they would continue to improve but this hope was short lived. The new club would struggle for almost 20 years before finally reaching their first finals series in 1985.

== 1970s ==
In this period, Penrith repeatedly tried to attract the star Australian players they knew they needed. They were consistently unsuccessful in this. This was primarily due to Penrith's poor reputation and perceived remote location. Unable to attract local players, in mid 1973 Penrith looked overseas and signed the Great Britain internationals Mike Stephenson and Bill Ashurst for the 1974 season. There was some logic to this. The early 1970s were the last 'Glory Days' for Great Britain in Rugby league. In mid 1973 Great Britain held the Rugby League Ashes and were reigning Rugby League World Cup Champions. The problem was not the players abilities. Stephenson was a tough hooker and could be a very effective playmaker. Ashurst in particular was a brilliant player on his day, he had great acceleration, could chip and chase and was also the first person to use the "around the corner" style of goalkicking in Australia, months before John Gray demonstrated this in the 1974 Test series. However Stephenson and Ashurst did not get on personally and this inhibited any development of a strong team.

Penrith had a crop of exciting young stars come through in the 1970s. Players such as Kevin Dann, Ross Gigg, Phil Gould, Paul Merlo, Zac Olejarnik, Tim Sheens, Glenn West, and Terry Wickey showed great potential. One of the highlights from the 1970s was beating the 1974 premiers, Eastern Suburbs, to make the final of the 1974 Amco Cup. However, they were beaten in the finals by Western Division. Their best regular seasons were 1971 – 8th place and 1974 & 76 – 9th place.

== 1980s ==
The 1980s was a decade of highs and lows for Penrith. 1980–83 saw Penrith finish at, or near, the bottom of the table. In 1984 Tim Sheens took over as coach and they had their best season ever, finishing sixth, one point outside the five. Sheens was able to instill in Penrith something they had never possessed before, consistency. At one stage they won a record (for Penrith) five straight games. They seemed assured of making history but at the most critical time of the season suffered a drop in form, winning only one of their last four games. This was the year that saw the debut of Greg Alexander.

They went one better in 1985, when they defeated Manly 10–7 at the SCG in a playoff for fifth spot. Their joy was short lived however as they were comprehensively defeated 38-6 by a star-studded Parramatta team the following weekend in the qualifying final. The team finished eighth in 1986 but plummeted to second last in 1987.

The late 1980s saw the first grade debut of future stars such as Mark Geyer, John Cartwright, Steve Carter and Brad Fittler. Added to now established veterans such as Greg Alexander, Brad Izzard and Royce Simmons, a team was starting to develop that finally lived up to the potential of a club with the biggest junior league nursery in the world.

Former player and now Football Manager, Ross Gigg, made what some have regarded as the best ever signings in Penrith's history prior to the 1988 season. Established stars Peter Kelly and Chris Mortimer were signed along with a new coach, the veteran Ron Willey. These people knew what it took to win a premiership and they added the experience and attitude needed to be a true contender. In 1988 and the team finished equal 5th, losing the playoff with eventual Grand Finalists Balmain. In 1989 Penrith finished second in the regular season. However two successive losses saw them exit the playoffs early. Player dissatisfaction with Ron Willey's coaching style saw Phil Gould appointed to the role for 1990.

== 1990s ==
Continuing the momentum gathered in the late 1980s, the 1990 team finished third on the regular season points table. Going into the finals the Panthers, having never previously won a playoff game, reversed the trend and won both their qualifying and semi final games to qualify for their first ever Grand Final appearance in 1990. With a team boasting notable players such as Greg Alexander, Brad Fittler, Chris Mortimer and Mark Geyer Penrith were clearly overawed by the occasion, but they had their chances and were somewhat unlucky to be beaten by the Canberra Raiders 18–14. The next year the Panthers were Minor Premiers and met the Raiders again in the Grand Final, this time winning 19 to 12, including two tries by Royce Simmons the former team captain in his last game. They went on to play Wigan in England for the 1991 World Club Challenge but were beaten by the British champions 21–4.

Their reign was short lived as in 1992 tragedy struck the club when the younger brother of Captain Greg Alexander, Ben, died in a car accident in late June. This eventually led to the breakup of the strong combination that had look set to dominate for the next few years. Penrith's form had been very good in 1992 up to this point, they had comprehensively beaten eventual premiers Brisbane 24–10 in round 4 at Lang Park, one of only two home losses they suffered that year, and were firmly entrenched in the top 3, having won 9 of their 13 games. However, after the accident they would only win 2 out of their next 9 games, finishing ninth (still only three points out of the top five). Greg and close family friends Mark Geyer and Brad Fittler left the club soon after (Fittler left after the 1995 season as Penrith had signed with Super League) as well as coach Phil Gould left mid-way through the 1994 season, to be replaced by Royce Simmons.

The Panthers were coached by former player and club captain Royce Simmons starting with the last six games in 1994 until the end of 2001.

During the Super League war Penrith aligned themselves with the breakaway competition. Playing in Super League's 1997 Telstra Cup, they reached the finals. They continued to compete the following year in the re-united National Rugby League.

== 2000s ==
Penrith again made the finals in the 2000 NRL season. However, in the year 2001, they came last on the competition ladder. 2001 was Royce Simmons' last season as coach for the Panthers, and he was replaced by John Lang from Cronulla in 2002, where they finished 12th. Their last game of 2002 showed hope as they proceeded to thrash the Northern Eagles, knocking them out of the final eight.

This showed the promise that was to come the next year. With the signing of Preston Campbell and Joe Galuvao, their side fired in 2003. Coming off 3 early season losses, they proceeded to lose only 3 other games for the rest of the competition with the local hero, Rhys Wesser scoring a new club record 25 tries. Penrith finished as Minor Premiers after convincingly accounting for the Parramatta Eels in the last round of competition. In the Finals series Penrith beat the Brisbane Broncos and New Zealand Warriors to reach the Grand Final against the Sydney Roosters.

Penrith, entering the match as underdogs, defeated the Roosters 18–6, with winger Luke Rooney scored two tries. Hooker Luke Priddis received the Clive Churchill Medal. The game is also remembered for a spectacular tackle by Scott Sattler in the 2nd Half Roosters winger Todd Byrne, who was sprinting down the left wing for an almost certain try.

Penrith lost the World Club Challenge in early 2004, with Bradford defeating them 22–4 in sub-zero temperatures.

They did however rally after that loss and once again qualified for the NRL semi-final series by finishing fourth and defeating St George Illawarra in the first week of the semifinals before being knocked out by the Bulldogs in a controversial Grand Final qualifier two weeks later.

The Panthers then just failed to qualify for the Top 8 in 2005 finishing two points out and in tenth spot on percentages before enduring another below-par season in 2006 this time falling well short of the finals finishing the year in 12th position. The 2007 season turned out to be a poor one for the Panthers, they won only eight games, finished last and "won" the wooden-spoon for the second time in six years after losing to the New Zealand Warriors in the last round of the regular season competition. In 2008 the Panthers improved four spots on their 2007 performance by finishing in 12th spot out of 16 teams in the NRL competition with 10 wins, one draw and 13 losses.

In 2009, the Penrith Panthers had a strong season up until the final rounds, but towards the end of the season lost 4 of their last 5 games to just miss out on a top 8 place.

== 2010s ==
For the 2010 season a teal jersey was used as the away strip. Panthers signings for this year included Adrian Purtell, Nigel Plum, Daine Laurie, Dave Simmons and Sandor Earl.

The Panthers wrapped up second spot on the ladder with a team led by veteran Petero Civinoceva, with players such as Lachlan Coote, Michael Gordon, Luke Lewis, Michael Jennings and Luke Walsh in particular having strong seasons. This was the first time that the Panthers have made the playoffs since 2004. Their season ended with a 34–12 loss to Sydney Roosters.

Subsequent seasons were not as successful, with the Panthers missing the finals in 2011, 2012 and 2013. During this period, the club made significant changes to its management structure, coaching staff and player roster. In 2011, former Panthers captain and premiership winning coach Phil Gould was appointed as General Manager of Rugby League, with responsibility for the entire rugby league operations of the club. Shortly after, first grade coach Matt Elliott and assistant coach Wayne Collins were sacked, with assistant coach Steve Georgallis acting as interim coach of the first grade team. In July 2011, Ivan Cleary signed a 3-year contract to join Penrith as first grade coach from season 2012. Over the course of 2012 and 2013, the Panthers released a number of long-serving star players including Petero Civoniceva, Luke Lewis, Michael Jennings and Michael Gordon.

A playing roster overhaul saw the arrival of big name players such as Jamie Soward, Peter Wallace, Jamal Idris, Tyrone Peachey and Elijah Taylor at Penrith, while Matt Moylan took the vacant fullback role left by the departed Lachlan Coote.

2014 was a good year for Penrith as they qualified for the finals and made it to the preliminary final before losing to Canterbury 18–12.

The Penrith Panthers celebrated their 50th year in the NRL in 2016.

In 2017, Penrith finished 7th on The NRL Premiership table and qualified for the finals. Penrith defeated Manly in week one of the finals 22-10 and then were defeated by Brisbane the following week 13–6 at Suncorp Stadium thus eliminating them from the competition. The Penrith reserve grade side fared much better, firstly winning The Intrust Super Premiership by defeating Wyong 20-12 and then defeating The PNG Hunters the following week in The State Championship final 42–18.

In 2018, Penrith finished 5th on the table at the end of the regular season during which coach Anthony Griffin was sacked four weeks before the finals series after falling out with Phil Gould. Griffin was then replaced by Cameron Ciraldo for the remainder of the season. In week one of the finals, Penrith easily accounted for the New Zealand Warriors to set up a clash with Cronulla. Although both clubs were admitted into the competition in 1967 this would provide the first meeting between the two clubs in a finals match. In a tight game, Cronulla defeated Penrith 21-20 ending their season.

Before the commencement of the 2019 NRL season, Penrith were predicted by many to challenge for the premiership and reach the finals. Penrith got off to a bad start with the club winning only 2 of their first 10 matches leaving the team bottom of the table. Penrith would then go on to win their next 7 games in a row leaving them just outside the finals places. In a must win game against the Sydney Roosters in round 24, Penrith lost the match 22–6 at the Sydney Cricket Ground which meant that the club would miss out on the finals series for the first time since 2015.

== 2020s ==
Penrith started the 2020 NRL season with three wins and a draw before suffering a 16-10 loss to Parramatta. The club then went on a 15-game unbeaten run to claim the 2020 Minor Premiership, only the third time in the club's history they had achieved this feat.

Penrith would go on to reach the 2020 NRL Grand Final after going 17 games unbeaten throughout the year and in the finals. The opponents in the grand final were Melbourne who raced out to a 22-0 lead at half-time. Penrith came back in the second half of the game but lost the grand final 26-20 at ANZ Stadium.

At the start of the 2021 NRL season, Penrith became the first team in Rugby League History to win their opening two games without conceding a point as they beat North Queensland 24-0 and then defeated Canterbury 28-0.

In round 4 of the 2021 NRL season, Penrith defeated Manly-Warringah 46-6 at Brookvale Oval inflicting Manly's worst ever home defeat. The win also meant that Penrith had their best start to a season since 1997 when they won their opening four games in that year.
