= 1967 Penrith Panthers season =

- NSWRFL rank: 11th
- 1967 record: Wins: 5; draws: 2; losses: 15
- Points scored: For: 203; against: 352

Team information
- Coach: Leo Trevena
- Captain: Tony Brown
- Stadium: Penrith Park
- Avg. attendance: 7,505

Top scorers
- Tries: David Applebee (6), Bob Landers
- Goals: Bob Landers (35)
- Points: Bob Landers (88)

The Penrith Panthers 1967 season is the Penrith Panthers 1st first-grade season. The club competes in Australasia's NSWRFL. The coach of the team is Leo Trevena.

== Regular season ==
Date	Round	Opponent	Venue	Score	Tries	Goals	Attendance
April 2	1	Canterbury-Bankstown	Belmore Sports Ground	12-15	Fagan (2)	Landers (3)	10,250
April 8	2	Newtown Jets	Penrith Park	16-10	Landers, Applebee	Landers (4), Fagan (FG)	5,026
April 16	3	Manly-Warringah	Brookvale Oval	8-17	Landers	Fagan (FG)	9,279
April 23	4	St George	Penrith Park	24-12	Johnstone, Mora, Peckham, Raper	Landers (6)	12,201
April 25	5	North Sydney Bears	North Sydney Oval	6-18		Landers (2), Fagan (FG)	9,627
April 30	6	Western Suburbs	Penrith Park	12-16	Landers (2)	Landers (3)	9,541
May 7	7	Eastern Suburbs	Penrith Park	10-26	Peckham, Workman	Landers (2)	7,290
May 14	8	Balmain Tigers	Leichhardt Oval	5-15	McCall	Landers (1)	9,351
May 21	9	South Sydney	Penrith Park	0-39			10,300
May 28	10	Parramatta Eels	Cumberland Oval	2-25		Landers (1)	12,917
June 4	11	Cronulla-Sutherland	Sutherland Oval	13-10	Applebee, Raper, Peckham	Moran (2)	5,602
June 12	12	Canterbury-Bankstown	Penrith Park	2-7		Moran	7,684
June 17	13	Newtown Jets	Henson Park	5-15	Applebee	Landers	1,364
June 25	14	Manly-Warringah	Penrith Park	10-8	Piper, Raper	Landers, Peckham (FG)	4,856
July 1	15	St. George Dragons	Kogarah Oval	2-25		Raper	7,537
July 9	16	North Sydney Bears	Penrith Park	12-12	Applebee, Landers	Landers (3)	4,324
July 16	17	Western Suburbs Magpies	Lidcombe Oval	4-10		Bailey, Landers	6,013
Legend: Win Loss Draw

== Ladder ==
	Team	Pld	W	D	L	PF	PA	PD	Pts
1	St. George	22	16	1	5	437	267	+170	33
2	South Sydney	22	16	0	6	422	271	+151	32
3	Canterbury-Bankstown	22	14	1	7	349	269	+80	29
4	Eastern Suburbs	22	13	2	7	269	219	+50	28
5	Manly-Warringah	22	12	2	8	365	271	+94	26
6	Balmain	22	12	2	8	344	258	+86	26
7	Western Suburbs	22	10	2	10	269	255	+14	22
8	North Sydney	22	8	1	13	297	370	-73	17
9	Parramatta	22	8	0	14	309	322	-13	16
10	Newtown	22	7	2	13	274	406	-132	16
11	Penrith	22	5	2	15	203	352	-149	12
12	Cronulla-Sutherland	22	3	1	18	208	486	-278	7
