= Terry Wickey =

Australian rugby league footballer

Personal information
- Full name: Terry Wickey
- Born: 5 November 1954 (age 70); Sydney, New South Wales, Australia

Playing information
- Position: Halfback
Club
Years	Team	Pld	T	G	FG	P
1975–80	Penrith Panthers	90	17	0	0	51
1982	Canberra Raiders	10	0	0	0	0
	Total	100	17	0	0	51
Representative
Years	Team	Pld	T	G	FG	P
1973	Australian Aborigines
- Source: As of 11 January 2024

Terry Wickey (born 5 November 1954) is an Australian former rugby league footballer who played in the New South Wales Rugby League competition in the 1970s and 1980s. He played most of his career at the Penrith Panthers, but he also had a brief stint at the Canberra Raiders. His position of choice was halfback.

== Playing career ==
Wickey was graded by the Penrith Panthers in the 1974 season. Penrith captain-coach Mike Stephenson gave Wickey his first grade debut in the 1975 season, in his side's 23−8 loss to the Balmain Tigers at Penrith Park in round 10. He scored his first try in the Panthers' 24–15 loss to the St. George Dragons at Kogarah Oval the following week.

Wickey was regarded as a tough and no-nonsense halfback who always gave his best every week. This, along with his long, curly hair, made him a very popular player with the Penrith fans. Despite this, the 1970s was a troubled period both on and off the field for the Panthers club. Penrith repeatedly tried to attract the star Australian players they knew they needed to ensure the club’s growth, but they were consistently unsuccessful in doing this. This was primarily due to Penrith's poor reputation and its seemingly remote location, the M4 Motorway still being only a distant dream during the 1970s.

Because of this lack of outside recruitment, Penrith had to rely on a crop of exciting young stars to fill its playing ranks in the 1970s. Along with Wickey, players such as Kevin Dann, Ross Gigg, Phil Gould, Paul Merlo, Zac Olejarnik, Tim Sheens and Glenn West all showed great potential, but they lacked the right sort of on-field leadership and direction to turn the Panthers into a successful team. Wickey was the club's first-choice halfback throughout the second half of the 1970s. After playing only three matches in the 1980 season, a season in which Penrith finished with the wooden spoon for the second time in the club's history, Wickey's stint with the Panthers ended.

In 1982, Wickey joined the newly-formed entity the Canberra Raiders. He made ten appearances for the Raiders in their inaugural year before retiring at season's end. In total, Wickey played 100 first-grade games and scored 17 tries.
