= Kurt Landers =

Australian rugby league footballer

Personal information
- Full name: Kurt Landers

Playing information
- Position: Wing
Club
Years	Team	Pld	T	G	FG	P
1990–91	St. George	7	2	0	0	8
1994–95	Penrith Panthers	4	0	0	0	0
	Total	11	2	0	0	8
- Source: As of 31 January 2023
- Father: Bob Landers

Kurt Landers is an Australian former professional rugby league footballer who played in the 1990s. He played for Penrith and St. George in the NSWRL/ARL competition.

== Background ==
Landers is the son of former Penrith and Eastern Suburbs player Bob Landers.

== Playing career ==
A St. George junior, Landers made his first grade debut for the club in round 12 of the 1990 NSWRL season against North Sydney at Kogarah Oval, scoring a try in St. George's 18-12 victory. Landers made a total of seven appearances for the club over two seasons.

He signed with Penrith for the 1994 season, and appeared in the reserve grade team for the majority of the season, making his club debut late in the season, coming off the bench in round 19 against North Sydney at Penrith Stadium. It would be his solitary first appearance. He earnt selection on the wing in the opening round of the 1995 season, playing in the first two matches before returning for one final first grade appearance in round 16.
