= Laurie Fagan =

Australian rugby league footballer (1941–2020)

Personal information
- Born: 3 May 1941
- Died: 28 September 2020 (aged 79)

Playing information
- Position: Halfback
Club
Years	Team	Pld	T	G	FG	P
1958–66	Balmain	98	19	22	0	101
1967–70	Penrith Panthers	77	10	2	4	42
	Total	175	29	24	4	143
Representative
Years	Team	Pld	T	G	FG	P
1962	New South Wales	1	0	0	0	0

Laurie Fagan (3 May 1941 – 28 September 2020) was a professional rugby league footballer who played in the 1950s and 1960s. Fagan played for Balmain and the Penrith Panthers in the New South Wales Rugby League (NSWRL) competition.

== Playing career ==
A local junior, Fagan was graded with Balmain in 1958 and was in first grade the following year, replacing Brian Staunton. In 1962 Fagan played for New South Wales against Queensland and Great Britain. Also, in 1962, he was named The Sun Herald 'Player of the Year'. Fagan was slowly forced out of Balmain's first grade side after club had signed the Englishman Dave Bolton during 1965.

Fagan moved to the new Penrith club in 1967 and was their foundation captain during their debut season, but ultimately lost the captaincy in 1968 to another ex-Balmian team-mate, Bob Boland. Fagan stayed at Penrith until 1970, playing 77 first grade matches before retiring.

At a dinner in 2008, Fagan was inducted into the Balmain Tigers Hall of Fame.
