= Tony Brown (rugby league) =

Australian rugby league player (1936–2022)

Personal information
- Full name: Andrew John Brown
- Born: 20 February 1936 Sydney, New South Wales, Australia
- Died: 15 April 2022 (aged 86)

Playing information
- Height: 5 ft 8 in (173 cm)
- Weight: 12 st 0 lb (76 kg; 168 lb)
- Position: Five-eighth
Club
Years	Team	Pld	T	G	FG	P
1956–64	Newtown	119	20	6	0	72
1967	Penrith	3	0	0	0	0
	Total	122	20	6	0	72
Representative
Years	Team	Pld	T	G	FG	P
1958–62	NSW City	3	4	0	0	6
1958–62	New South Wales	9	2	0	0	6
1958–60	Australia	10	0	0	0	0

Andrew John Brown (20 February 1936 – 15 April 2022) was an Australian professional rugby league footballer who played in the 1950s and 1960s. An Australian international and New South Wales interstate representative five-eighth, and later lock forward, he played club football in Sydney's NSWRFL Premiership, captaining Newtown and later Penrith in their inaugural season.

== Playing career ==
While playing in Sydney's NSWRFL Premiership for the Newtown club, Brown gained representative selection in the City, New South Wales and Australian teams.

In 1958, he was selected to make his debut for the Australian national team, becoming Kangaroo No. 335.

He was selected for the first two tests against Great Britain but missed the decider due to injury. The following year he played three tests against New Zealand and was selected for the Australian national team to go on the 1959–60 Kangaroo tour, playing at five-eighth in the first test against France.

Having been released by Newtown in 1964, Brown was signed by second division club Penrith, who later gained entry into the first division premiership for the 1967 NSWRFL season. He captained Penrith in the opening rounds of their inaugural season before a leg injury ended his season.

For the Newtown Jets' centenary celebrations the club named its "Team of the Century" (1908–2008) which included Brown as a five-eighth.
