= Jack Clare =

Australian rugby league player

Playing information
- Position: Five-eighth
Club
Years	Team	Pld	T	G	FG	P
1947	Balmain Tigers	1	0	0	0	0

Coaching information
Club
Years	Team	Gms	W	D	L	W%
1974	Penrith Panthers	22	9	0	13	41

Jack Clare is an Australian former rugby league player and coach.

Clare's career in first-grade was limited to one appearance during the Balmain Tigers premiership winning 1947 NSWRFL season, standing in for Pat Devery at five-eighth in a round 13 match against South Sydney. He later served the club as a selector and Chairman of Selectors from 1970-1973.

Jack Clare left the Balmain Tigers in 1948 for a job and player position at Corrimal Cougars as the halfback-captain and helped them win their first ever premiership in the Illawarra Rugby League competition. https://en.wikipedia.org/wiki/Corrimal_Cougars

Jack Clare’s appointment as Penrith Panthers Head Coach in 1974 explained in detail by then CEO Roger Cowen.

"There were similar systems used at the time in American football... Penrith needed a football man of stature to lead the panel. Jack Clare came to the club with an exceptional reputation, having built a highly successful record coaching junior and schoolboy representative teams, including guiding Fairfield Patrician Brothers to premiership success, alongside his background as a former first-grade player and Chairman of Selectors with Balmain." Cowan, Roger. Panthers, Passion & Politics: The Roger Cowan Years, Chapter: "Innovation Stumbles Over Prejudice"

A former coach of Grenfell in the Maher Cup, Clare was a relative unknown when chosen to succeed Leo Trevena as Penrith coach at the end of the 1973 season, heading a four-man panel which included Roy Masters as skills coach. The Panthers finished in ninth position and he was replaced the following season by Mike Stephenson.
