= Royce Simmons =

Australian rugby league footballer and coach

Royce Simmons OAM
Personal information
- Full name: Royce Michael Simmons
- Born: 2 May 1959 (age 67) (Note: Simmons' year of birth was reported as 1960 until he revealed on 2 May 2019, his 60th birthday, that he was actually born in 1959. He stated that he lowered his age when first signing with the Penrith Panthers in 1980 to benefit the longevity of his playing career.) Gooloogong, New South Wales, Australia

Playing information
- Height: 173 cm (5 ft 8 in)
- Weight: 86 kg (13 st 8 lb)
- Position: Hooker
Club
Years	Team	Pld	T	G	FG	P
1980–91	Penrith Panthers	238	15	1	3	61
Representative
Years	Team	Pld	T	G	FG	P
1984–88	New South Wales	10	1	0	0	4
1986–87	Australia	10	0	0	0	0

Coaching information
Club
Years	Team	Gms	W	D	L	W%
1992–94	Hull F.C.	27	10	1	16	37
1994–01	Penrith Panthers	187	77	6	104	41
2011–12	St Helens	41	24	4	13	59
	Total	255	111	11	133	44

Royce Michael Simmons OAM (born 2 May 1959) is an Australian former professional rugby league footballer and coach. A one-club man, he played as a hooker for the Penrith Panthers in the New South Wales Rugby League (NSWRL) from 1980 to 1991, winning a premiership in his final season. He later coached the Panthers from 1994 to 2001, in between coaching English sides Hull F.C. (1992–94) and St Helens (2011–12).

Born in Gooloogong, New South Wales, Simmons was a representative of his home state. He made ten appearances for Australia during 1986–87.

In June 2016, Simmons was inducted into the Penrith Panthers Hall of Fame alongside Grahame Moran, Greg Alexander and Craig Gower. He was awarded the Medal of the Order of Australia in the 2025 Australia Day Honours.

== Playing career ==
After trialing with both St George and Souths, Simmons was eventually given a contract in 1980 with Penrith. Simmons played much of his first year at lock but was moved to hooker late in the 1981 season.

Simmons was first selected to represent New South Wales as a hooker for games II and III of the 1984 State of Origin series, replacing Rex Wright who had been chosen for game I.

After missing the 1985 series when selectors chose Balmain's Benny Elias instead, Simmons regained his place for the Blues in the successful 1986 series against Queensland, including a Man of the Match in game I. Simmons secured a place as the first Penrith player to represent Australia when made his Test debut in the first match against New Zealand at Carlaw Park in Auckland, and played in ten international games over the next year. Simmons' final Test appearance came in Australia at Lang Park, Brisbane, against New Zealand, losing 6–13.

At the end of the 1986 NSWRL season, Simmons was selected for the undefeated 1986 Kangaroo tour and played in all six tests on the tour against Papua New Guinea, Great Britain and France. Simmons and Halfback Greg Alexander became the first Penrith players to be selected for a Kangaroo Tour.

Simmons was selected for all games of the 1987 State of Origin series, including the fourth game held at the Veterans Memorial Stadium in Long Beach, California (United States). His last appearance in a New South Wales jersey was in game I of the 1988 series at the Sydney Football Stadium, with NSW losing 18–26. The Blues would not win another game until Game 1 of the 1990 series.

In 1983, Simmons was appointed captain of the team, a position he retained until 1990 when he captained the Panthers in the 1990 Grand Final loss to the Canberra Raiders. Despite struggling with injuries, he memorably scored two tries in the 1991 Grand Final against the same opponents. The Panthers won their first premiership, and Simmons retired with his second try late in the game (and Alexander's brilliant sideline conversion) sealing the win for the Phil Gould coached Panthers. In the post-game celebrations, Simmons said he wanted to have a beer with every Penrith supporter. He also stated that despite being overjoyed at finally winning a premiership, nothing could erase the bad memory of losing the 1990 decider to the Raiders. Following the grand final victory he travelled with the Panthers to England for the 1991 World Club Challenge which was lost to Wigan.

In October 2004, Simmons was named at hooker in the Panthers' "Team of Legends'".

== Coaching career ==
Simmons began coaching in 1992 for St Marys reserve grade side. Late that year he moved to England to coach Hull F.C. for two seasons.

Simmons went on to become Panthers coach in the closing stages of the 1994 NSWRL season after Phil Gould was dismissed, and served for seven seasons until he was himself sacked from the position after the 2001 NRL season, when the Panthers won the wooden spoon. The Panthers made the finals twice under Simmons' tenure, in the 1997 Super League finals and National Rugby League season 2000 finals.

Simmons served as the Wests Tigers assistant coach under his former coach Tim Sheens from 2003 to 2010, during which time they took out the 2005 NRL Premiership. He has also worked as Tim Sheens' assistant coach for the Australian national team.

Simmons was named to take over the coaching position at St Helens in 2011.

He coached the St Helens in the 2011 Super League Grand Final defeat by the Leeds Rhinos at Old Trafford.

He parted company with St Helens in March 2012. Simmons was sacked after a five-game losing streak. Commenting on the decision, he said, "If I had a neck, I'd probably hang myself."

In November 2012, Simmons was named assistant coach at NRL side Wests Tigers.

== Health ==
In February 2022, Simmons revealed that he had been diagnosed with Alzheimer's disease.

== Honours ==
In the 2025 Australia Day Honours List, Simmons was appointed as a Member of the Medal of the Order of Australia (OAM), "For service to rugby league as a player and coach."
