= Wayne Peckham =

Australian rugby league footballer

Wayne Darcy Peckham
Personal information
- Full name: Wayne Darcy Peckham
- Born: 1944 Dubbo, New South Wales, Australia
- Died: 24 October 2016 (aged 71–72) Cairns, Queensland , Australia

Playing information
- Position: Centre, Wing, Second-row
Club
Years	Team	Pld	T	G	FG	P
1967–69	Penrith	41	11	0	1	35
1970–72	Canterbury Bankstown	26	7	0	1	23
	Total	67	18	0	2	58

Wayne Darcy Peckham (1944–2016) was an Indigenous Australian rugby league footballer who played in the 1960s and 1970s. He played for Penrith and Canterbury as a centre but also played on the wing and as a second rower. Wayne Peckham was an Inaugural player for Penrith and the club's First Indigenous Player.

== Playing career ==
Originally from Moree, Peckham made his first grade debut for the newly admitted Penrith side in 1967. Peckham played in the club's first ever game against Canterbury-Bankstown which ended in a 15-12 defeat. In the club's inaugural season, Penrith finished second last on the table, 5 points clear of wooden spooners Cronulla. Peckham went on to play 2 further seasons for Penrith before signing with Canterbury-Bankstown. Peckham went on to play 3 seasons with Canterbury and spent most of his time there changing between the reserve grade and first grade sides. At the end of 1972, Peckham retired from rugby league. He died on 24 October 2016 aged 72.
