= Barry Harris (rugby league) =

Australian rugby league footballer and coach

Personal information
- Full name: Barry John Harris
- Born: 9 May 1938; Camperdown, New South Wales, Australia
- Died: 1 February 2006 (aged 67); Sydney, New South Wales, Australia

Playing information
- Position: Second-row
Club
Years	Team	Pld	T	G	FG	P
1957–60	Newtown	65	7	0	0	21
1963–64	South Sydney	8	0	0	0	0
1967	Penrith	15	0	0	0	0
	Total	88	7	0	0	21
Representative
Years	Team	Pld	T	G	FG	P
1959–62	New South Wales	5	0	0	0	0
1961–62	NSW Country	2	1	0	0	3

Coaching information
Club
Years	Team	Gms	W	D	L	W%
1975–76	Penrith Panthers	28	9	2	17	32

Barry Harris (1938–2006) was an Australian rugby league footballer and coach who played for Newtown, South Sydney and the Penrith Panthers. Harris was a foundation player for Penrith and played in the club's first season.

== Playing career ==
Harris was a Newtown junior and made his first grade debut for the club in 1957. In 1959, Newtown qualified for the finals and Harris played in the starting side against Manly which ended in a 17–0 defeat. In the same year, Harris was also selected to play for New South Wales against Queensland in the interstate series. Harris left Newtown at the end of 1960 and moved out to Dubbo playing in the local country competition.

While playing out at Dubbo, Harris was selected to play for NSW Country on 2 occasions and was chosen to represent New South Wales. In 1963, Harris moved back to Sydney and joined Souths. Harris spent three unsuccessful seasons at the club before joining newly admitted Penrith in 1967. Harris played in the club's first ever game against Canterbury and made 15 appearances in their debut season as they finished second last. Harris retired at the end of 1967 as a player.

== Coaching career ==
In 1975, Harris became the first grade coach at Penrith and spent two years in the top job. Harris had an unsuccessful coaching spell with Penrith finishing towards the bottom of the ladder and he was sacked at the end of 1976. He was later replaced by Don Parish.

Sporting positions
Preceded by Mike Stephenson; 1975	Coach Penrith Panthers; 1975–1976	Succeeded by Don Parish; 1977-1978
