= Bill McCall (rugby league) =

Australian rugby league footballer

Personal information
- Full name: Bill McCall

Playing information
- Position: Prop
Club
Years	Team	Pld	T	G	FG	P
1958	Eastern Suburbs	20	0	0	0	0
1961–63	Parramatta	32	1	0	0	3
1967	Penrith	22	1	0	0	3
	Total	74	2	0	0	6

Bill McCall is an Australian former rugby league footballer who played as a prop in the 1950s and 1960s for Penrith, Eastern Suburbs and Parramatta. McCall was an inaugural player for Penrith.

== Playing career ==
McCall made his first grade debut for Eastern Suburbs in 1958. In 1961, McCall joined perennial strugglers Parramatta and in his first season at the club they finished last on the table. In 1962, Parramatta announced former St George player Ken Kearney as their new coach. Kearney's appointment turned the club from easy beats to a team that could challenge and be competitive. Parramatta went on to finish 4th in Kearney's first year and in 1963 the club won their first ever finals match against Balmain with McCall starting at prop. The following week, McCall played in Parramatta's first ever preliminary final against St George which ended in defeat.

In 1967, McCall joined newly admitted side Penrith and played in the club's first ever game against Canterbury which ended in a 15-12 loss. McCall played 22 times for Penrith in their inaugural year and retired at the end of the season.
