= Zac Olejarnik =

Australian rugby league footballer

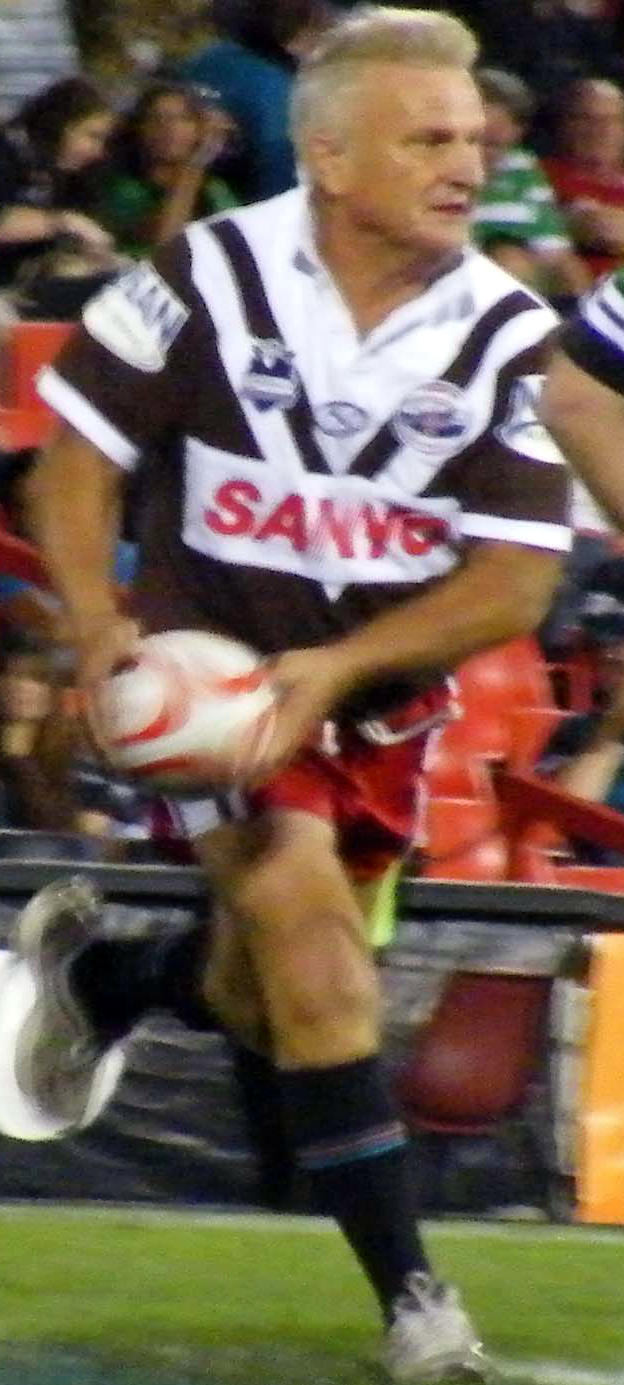

Personal information
- Full name: Zenon Olejarnik
- Born: 1952 (age 72–73)

Playing information
- Position: Five-eighth, Lock
Club
| Years | Team | Pld | T | G | FG | P |
|---|---|---|---|---|---|---|
| 1971–78 | Penrith Panthers | 81 | 18 | 0 | 0 | 54 |
Representative
| Years | Team | Pld | T | G | FG | P |
| 1972 | New South Wales | 1 | 0 | 0 | 0 | 0 |
- Source: As of 6 November 2019

Zac Olejarnik is an Australian former professional rugby league footballer who played for the Penrith Panthers in the NSWRL premiership. He played as a five-eighth and later on in his career at lock. Olejarnik played for the NSW Colts team in 1972.
