= Kevin Dann =

Australian rugby league footballer (1958–2021)

Personal information
- Full name: Kevin George Dann
- Born: 5 April 1958 Balmain, New South Wales, Australia
- Died: 21 February 2021 (aged 62)

Playing information
- Position: Fullback
Club
Years	Team	Pld	T	G	FG	P
1977–84	Penrith Panthers	121	40	100	1	322
Representative
Years	Team	Pld	T	G	FG	P
1980	New South Wales	1	0	1	0	2

Kevin George Dann (5 April 1958 – 21 February 2021) was an Australian professional rugby league footballer who played in the 1970s and 1980s. He played his entire club football career with the Penrith Panthers, as a fullback.

== Playing career ==
Dann was a Blacktown junior.He played for the Lalor Park Kookaburras.He made his first grade debut at fullback in his side's 25−14 victory over Newtown at Henson Park in round 2 of the 1977 season. In his first season at Penrith, Dann made 19 appearances and finished the season as the team's top try scorer with 9 tries, despite these efforts, the Panthers would go on to finish in 10th position. Dann continued playing with the Panthers for the next several years and become known for his unique ability to score and set up tries, his excellent attacking kicking and his solid defence.

In 1978, Dann played in all 22 games for the club as they once again finished 10th. In 1979, Dann once again played in all 22 games, and finished the season as the team's top points scorer with 61 points (6 tries, 21 goals, and 1 field goal) as they would for the third consecutive season finish in 10th position.

In 1980, despite his side going on to finish with the wooden spoon for the second time in the club's history, Dann was one of the Panthers best players for the season, and his consistent efforts were rewarded when he was selected at fullback for the New South Wales side in game 2 of the 1980 interstate series. This would be his only appearance in a representative game as he was overlooked for selection in the 1980 Australian test side that toured New Zealand, Garry Dowling was instead chosen as the fullback. He was also overlooked for selection in the inaugural 1980 State of Origin game in favor of the more experienced fullback Graham Eadie.

Dann had his best season in 1981, when he finished the season as both the club's top try scorer with 9 tries, and their top points scorer with 89 points (9 tries and 31 goals), these efforts would once again not turn the club's fortunes around as the Panthers finished the 1981 season in 11th position. In 1982, for the third and final time, Dann finished the season as the team's top points scorer with 66 points (2 tries and 30 goals), these efforts would be forlorn for his side as they went on to finish the season in 12th position, they finished only ahead of the competition's newcomers Illawarra Steelers and Canberra Raiders in 13th and 14th respectively.

In 1983, injuries and poor form took its toll on Dann: he managed to make only six appearances for his side and retired prematurely at the end of the season. He returned in 1984 under Tim Sheens' coaching, but played only one more first grade match. In total, Dann played 121 games, scored 40 tries, and kicked 100 goals and 1 field goal. At the time of his retirement in 1984 until Greg Alexander surpassed him in the 1986 season, he was third highest points scorer in the club's history behind Bob Landers and Mark Levy. He currently ranks at 11th.

== Post playing ==
In 2006, Dann was nominated as one of the fullbacks in the 40th Anniversary Penrith Panthers "Team of Legends" but ultimately lost out to Rhys Wesser.

Dann died on 21 February 2021, 43 days short of his 63rd birthday.
