= Leo Trevena =

Australian RL coach and former rugby league footballer

Personal information
- Full name: Leo Matthew Trevena
- Born: 1929 Enfield, New South Wales, Australia
- Died: 20 July 2013 (aged 83–84) Gold Coast, Queensland, Australia

Playing information
- Position: Halfback
Club
Years	Team	Pld	T	G	FG	P
1950–53	Western Suburbs	29	5	21	0	57
1954	Canterbury	11	2	5	0	16
	Total	40	7	26	0	73

Coaching information
Club
Years	Team	Gms	W	D	L	W%
1967	Penrith	44	10	2	32	23
1973	Penrith	22	5	0	17	23
	Total	66	15	2	49	23

Leo Trevena (1929–2013) was an Australian professional rugby league footballer who played in the 1950s, and coached in the 1960s and 1970s. He played for Canterbury-Bankstown and the Western Suburbs Magpies in the 1950s. He also coached the Penrith Panthers in their 1967 season and their 1973 season. He was the captain of Canterbury team in '54.

His brother Noel Raymond Trevena also played for Western Suburbs 1955-56, and then again in 1962.

== Playing career ==
Trevena played four seasons with Western Suburbs between 1950 and 1953. He played halfback in the 1950 Magpies team that were runners up in the premiership. He won a premiership with Western Suburbs in 1952 NSWRFL season. He joined the Canterbury-Bankstown for one season in 1954 was their main captain throughout the season.

== Coaching career ==
Trevena captain-coached Young to win the Clayton Cup in 1955. He coached the Penrith Panthers in 1967 and 1973.

He retired to the Gold Coast in later life, and died there on 20 July 2013.

Sporting positions
Preceded by Bob Boland; 1968-1972	Coach Penrith; 1973	Succeeded by Jack Clare; 1974
Preceded by	Coach Penrith; 1967	Succeeded by Bob Boland; 1968-1972
