= Ross Gigg =

Australian rugby league footballer

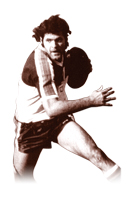

Personal information
- Full name: Ross William Gigg
- Born: 29 April 1956 Sydney, New South Wales, Australia
- Died: 8 May 2014 (aged 58)

Playing information
- Position: Centre
Club
| Years | Team | Pld | T | G | FG | P |
|---|---|---|---|---|---|---|
| 1974–79 | Penrith Panthers | 75 | 22 | 6 | 0 | 78 |
| 1980–81 | Lithgow Shamrocks |
| 1982–84 | Penrith Panthers | 35 | 9 | 0 | 0 | 35 |
| | Total | 110 | 31 | 6 | 0 | 113 |

Ross Gigg (29 April 1956 – 8 May 2014) was an Australian professional rugby league footballer who played with the Penrith Panthers in the New South Wales Rugby League (NSWRL) competition. Gigg's playing career spanned 1974-1979 and 1982–84. He made 110 first grade appearances, scoring 31 tries and six goals for a career total of 113 points. Gigg spent most of his career playing in the Centre position.

== Junior Football ==
Gigg played all of his junior football with the Blacktown Leagues club, now Blacktown City RLFC (Blacktown Bears) in the Penrith district. He captained the Penrith SG Ball team in 1971 and the Jersey Flegg team in 1973. Both of these teams made it through to the final – only to lose both times. His favoured position at this stage was five-eighth. Gigg was also a competitive athlete, making it to the final of the 400 metres and coming second in Javelin at the 1974 NSW State carnival.

In 1973 as a 17-year-old he was appointed captain of a combined Penrith under 18's team that toured New Zealand, and was subsequently graded for the 1974 season.

== Playing career ==
As an 18-year-old still attending school, Gigg started 1974 in the lower grades but started to make appearances in the top squad by mid year. He played on the wing in the inaugural Amco Cup final, and by the end of the year was making regular appearances in first grade. By the start of the 1975 season Gigg was firmly established in the top grade as a Centre, and his form that year saw him take out Penrith's player of the year award, quite an achievement for a 19-year-old. The years 1975-79 were frustrating ones as a regular first grader in a Penrith team that struggled to make an impact on the competition. 1979 saw a serious knee injury that sidelined him for a lengthy period mid season.

In 1980-81 he spent some time away from Penrith, playing in the Group 10 competition with Lithgow Shamrocks, before returning to Penrith in 1982. He played every first grade game in his last year in 1984 where the team missed the play-offs by one game. See History of the Penrith Panthers.

== After Football ==
After retiring at the end of the 1984 season Gigg worked in sports administration. His first role was as Assistant Club Secretary at Penrith where he secured somewhat of a coup in signing established stars Chris Mortimer and Peter Kelly (rugby league) to the club, still regarded by some as the best ever signings for Penrith. He then subsequently worked as CEO of the Western Australian Rugby League (WARL) and then took up a role as CEO of the Newcastle Harness Racing Club in 1992. During his 22-year tenure he oversaw major improvements to then track, the construction of a new grandstand and was successful in bringing top class events such as Interdominion heats and Grand Circuit racing to the Newcastle track. In 2008 he was instrumental in setting up the Hunter branch of the Men of League Foundation and had the role of secretary from its inception.

== Death ==
It was announced on 8 May 2014 he had died from a heart attack.

== Honoured by Penrith Panthers ==
In 2006 Gigg was one of the nominees for Centre in the Panthers all time Team of Legends.
