= Ron Workman =

Australian rugby league footballer

Personal information
- Full name: Ronald Samuel Workman
- Born: 7 June 1939 (age 87) Sydenham, New South Wales, Australia

Playing information
- Position: Hooker
Club
Years	Team	Pld	T	G	FG	P
1959–64	Parramatta	10	0	0	0	0
1967–72	Penrith	93	5	0	1	17
	Total	103	5	0	1	17

Ron Workman (born 7 June 1939) is an Australian former professional rugby league footballer who played in the 1960s and 1970s. He played for Parramatta and Penrith as a hooker. Workman was a foundation player for Penrith and played in the club's first ever game.

== Early life ==
Workman was born in Sydenham in the inner suburbs of Sydney and grew up there. In 1954, at the age of 15, he began an apprenticeship with the Royal Australian Air Force, and he later became a serving member.

== Playing career ==
Workman made his first grade debut for Parramatta in 1961 and played 4 seasons at the club but mainly featured for the lower grade sides only managing to make a total of 10 first grade appearances. Workman then went and served for the Australian Air Force in the Vietnam War before returning to Australia in 1966. In 1967, Workman joined newly admitted side Penrith and played in the club's first ever game against Canterbury. Workman played 6 seasons for Penrith and was named captain of the side in 1970. At the end of 1973, Workman left Penrith and moved to North Queensland playing in the local competition there before retiring.

== Post playing ==
After retiring from rugby league, Workman became club secretary of Penrith in 1975 and later became one of the club's administrators.
