= Bob Boland =

Australian rugby league footballer and coach

Personal information
- Full name: Robert Boland
- Born: 7 January 1938 (age 87); Balmain, New South Wales, Australia

Playing information
- Position: Second-row, Hooker
Club
Years	Team	Pld	T	G	FG	P
1957–67	Balmain	157	10	0	3	36
1968–70	Penrith	44	3	0	7	23
	Total	201	13	0	10	59

Coaching information
Club
Years	Team	Gms	W	D	L	W%
1968–72	Penrith	110	39	3	68	35

Bob Boland (born 7 January 1938) nicknamed "Bolo" is an Australian former professional rugby league footballer and coach who played for the Balmain Tigers and Penrith Panthers.

== Playing career ==
Boland made his debut for Balmain Tigers in 1957. Boland played with the club for 11 seasons and was a member of the Balmain sides who played in the 1964 and 1966 grand final defeats against St George. In 1968, Boland moved out west to join the newly-admitted club Penrith Panthers where he played for three seasons before retiring.

== Coaching career ==
After joining Penrith, Boland took on the role as captain-coach, but after retirement became the full-time non-playing coach. Boland held the position until he was terminated by the club at the end of the 1972 season. Boland's time as coach was not as successful as his playing career only winning 35% of games played. In 1976, Boland moved to Nambucca Heads and coached the Nambucca Roosters.

Sporting positions
Preceded by Leo Trevena; 1967	Coach Penrith Panthers; 1968-1972	Succeeded by Leo Trevena; 1973

== Later life ==
In 2016, Boland spoke about his playing career saying,
“I used to go to the movies or out around town and see the old Balmain players – and you look up to them ... when they said hello it gave you a bit of a lift, “When I started to play, I became the person people looked up to". “I used to get the tram to work and if I had a good game, everyone would want to sit next to me. If I had a shit game – I’d be all alone".
