= Glenn West =

Australian rugby league footballer

Personal information
- Full name: Glenn Alan West
- Born: 14 September 1954 (age 70); Balmain, New South Wales, Australia

Playing information
- Position: Wing, Centre
Club
Years	Team	Pld	T	G	FG	P
1974–77	Penrith Panthers	64	31	0	0	93
1978–79	Parramatta Eels	20	7	0	0	21
1981	Penrith Panthers	2	0	0	0	0
	Total	86	38	0	0	114

Glenn West (born 14 September 1954) nicknamed "Boney" is an Australian former rugby league footballer who played for Penrith Panthers and Parramatta Eels in the NSWRL competition.

== Early life ==
West was a Parramatta junior but graded with Penrith and played for the clubs lower grade teams before making his first grade debut in 1974. At the end of 1974, West finished as top try scorer for the club and scored a club record 4 tries in a game against Balmain.

West became a regular first grader for Penrith over the next 3 seasons but the club continued to struggle on the field and finished towards the bottom of the ladder. In 1978, West joined Parramatta and experienced finals football for the first time as the club finished 4th. Parramatta went on to defeat Canterbury in the first week with West playing in the match and then featured in the following weeks game against Manly which ended in a 17–11 loss.

West missed nearly all of the 1979 and 1980 seasons due to injury. In 1981, West rejoined Penrith but only managed 2 appearances before retiring prematurely because of persistent injuries.
