= Grahame Moran =

Australian rugby league footballer

Personal information
- Full name: Grahame Moran
- Born: Taree, New South Wales, Australia

Playing information
- Position: Centre, Five-eighth
Club
Years	Team	Pld	T	G	FG	P
1967–74	Penrith	121	25	4	0	83
Representative
Years	Team	Pld	T	G	FG	P
1966	NSW Country	1	0	1	0	2
1970	New South Wales	1	1	0	0	3
- Source: As of 27 June 2019
- Relatives: John Moran (brother)

Grahame Moran is a former professional rugby league footballer who played his entire first-grade career for the National Rugby League club Penrith Panthers with whom he was the 14th player.

== Playing career ==
Moran was originally from the New South Wales town of Taree and his preferred position was centre but also played five-eighth. Before joining the Panthers in its inaugural 1967 season, Moran played for a combined country team and in 1968, represented city seconds thus becoming the first Penrith player to play representative football.

Moran's career statistics were: 121 first grade games, 25 tries, 4 goals for 83 career points.

== Accolades ==
In 2006, Moran was selected as centre alongside Ryan Girdler in the Panthers' 40th anniversary team of legends.

On 25 June 2016, Moran was inducted into the Penrith Panthers hall of fame alongside Royce Simmons, Craig Gower and Greg Alexander.
