= David Applebee =

Australian rugby league footballer

Personal information
- Full name: David Applebee
- Born: 17 October 1946 (age 80) Gunnedah, New South Wales, Australia

Playing information
- Position: Centre, Wing
Club
Years	Team	Pld	T	G	FG	P
1967–72	Penrith	89	23	0	8	69
Representative
Years	Team	Pld	T	G	FG	P
1967	NSW City	1	0	0	0	0
1973	Queensland	1	0	0	0	0

David Applebee (born 17 October 1946) is an Australian former professional rugby league footballer who played in the 1960s and 1970s for Penrith in the NSWRL competition. Applebee was an inaugural player for Penrith and played in the club's first ever game. Applebee was also the first Penrith player to be awarded representative honors.

== Early life ==
Applebee was born and raised in Gunnedah, New South Wales and played his early rugby league with Oakdale in the Group 6 competition before being signed by Penrith at the end of 1966.

== Playing career ==
Applebee played on the wing in Penrith's first ever game which was a 15–12 defeat against Canterbury. Applebee was the first Penrith player to be selected for a representative side when he was picked to play for NSW City against NSW Country. Applebee spent 6 seasons at Penrith with the club finishing towards the bottom of the ladder each year and narrowly avoided the wooden spoon on each occasion. In 1973, Applebee moved to far North Queensland and played for Innisfail in the local competition. Applebee was then selected to represent Queensland in the interstate series against New South Wales.

After retirement, Applebee then returned to Oakdale and coached in the Group 6 competition.
