= Bob Landers =

Australian rugby league footballer

Personal information
- Full name: Robert John Landers
- Born: 11 September 1940
- Died: 12 April 1996 (aged 55)

Playing information
- Position: Fullback, Wing, Five-eighth
Club
Years	Team	Pld	T	G	FG	P
1959–65	Eastern Suburbs	108	41	253	0	629
1965–67	Leeds
1967–70	Penrith	68	18	187	0	428
	Total	176	59	440	0	1057
Representative
Years	Team	Pld	T	G	FG	P
1959	New South Wales	1	0	0	0	0
- Relatives: Kurt Landers (son)

Robert John "Bob" Landers (1940–1996) was an Australian professional rugby league footballer in the New South Wales Rugby League competition for the Eastern Suburbs and Penrith clubs. A long-striding wing, Landers played with the Eastern Suburbs club from (1959-1965) and played in the Roosters 1960 grand final loss to St. George. He was a student of St Josephs’ College in Sydney.

== Playing career ==
In 1959, Landers first season at the Eastern Suburbs club, he was selected to represent New South Wales rugby league team. Landers was the NSWRFL top point scorer in the 1960 NSWRFL season, and the 1961 NSWRFL season. After leaving Easts at the end of the 1965 season Landers joined English club Leeds before returning to Australia where he played with Penrith Panthers in their first season in the NSWRFL in 1967.

He retired as Penrith's leading point scorer after 4 seasons in 1970. Landers was named as a winger in Penrith's 'Greatest Team' since its inception in 1967. While playing football, Landers also served in the New South Wales Police Force, and in 2008, rugby league's centennial year in Australia, he was named on the wing in a NSW Police team of the century.
