= Penrith Panthers =

Australian rugby league football club

Club information
- Full name: Penrith Panthers; Rugby League Club Ltd
- Nickname(s): Panthers, The Mountain Men, The Riff, Pink Panthers, Penriff, Chocolate Soldiers
- Short name: PEN
- Colours: Primary; Black; Secondary; Red; Yellow; Green; Away; Pink; Deep Pink
- Founded: 4 July 1966; 60 years ago
- Website: penrithpanthers.com.au

Current details
- Ground: Western Sydney Stadium (2025–2026) (30,000) Penrith Stadium (1967–2024, 2027) (22,500)
- CEO: Matt Cameron (PDRLFC) Andrew Hill (Panthers Group)
- Chairman: Peter Graham
- Coach: Ivan Cleary
- Manager: Shane Elford
- Captain: Isaah Yeo & Nathan Cleary
- Competition: National Rugby League
- 2026 season: 1st (minor premiers)
- Current season

Uniforms
Home colours	Away colours

Records
- Premierships: 6 (1991, 2003, 2021, 2022, 2023, 2024)
- Runners-up: 2 (1990, 2020)
- Minor premierships: 6 (1991, 2003, 2020, 2022, 2023, 2026)
- NSW Cup: 5 (1987, 2014, 2017, 2022, 2026)
- Wooden spoons: 4 (1973, 1980, 2001, 2007)
- Most capped: 286 – Isaah Yeo
- Highest try scorer: 113 – Rhys Wesser
- Highest points scorer: 1,824 – Nathan Cleary

The Penrith Panthers are an Australian professional rugby league football club based in the Greater Western Sydney suburb of Penrith that competes in the National Rugby League (NRL). The team is based 55 km (34 mi) west of the centre of Sydney, at the foot of the Blue Mountains.

Penrith were admitted to the New South Wales Rugby League (NSWRL) competition in 1967. Penrith struggled for almost twenty years before finally reaching their first finals series. The club achieved its first grand final appearance in 1990 but were beaten by the Canberra Raiders 18–14. The following year, Penrith met Canberra again in the 1991 Grand Final, this time winning the game 19–12.

Penrith won their second NRL premiership in 2003. Their most recent premiership achievement came in 2024, where they defeated the Melbourne Storm by 14–6 in the Grand Final. After losing the 2020 grand final to the Melbourne Storm, Penrith became the second club to retain the premiership in the NRL era as well as the first to win three and subsequently four premierships, winning the 2021, 2022, 2023, and the 2024 Grand Finals.

Ivan Cleary was appointed head coach in October 2018, having previously served in the same role between 2012–15. On 13 May 2026, Ivan Cleary announced he would step down as head coach at the end of the 2027 season, remaining at the club in an advisory role. He is set to be succeeded by assistant coach and former rugby league player Peter Wallace.

Former Penrith premiership winning head coach Phil Gould was the club's general manager but departed in 2019.

== History ==
Chart of yearly table positions for Penrith Panthers in First Grade Rugby League

Varied Penrith teams had played for many years between 1912 and 1966 in the Western Districts League under the control of the Western Suburbs RLFC. In the Parramatta competition after Parramatta was admitted to the NSWRL in 1947, and also in a second-tier Sydney competition introduced by the NSWRL in 1962. By this time a single top level rugby league team had emerged in the Penrith area and in 1964 they became known as the Penrith Panthers. The Panther had been chosen as the Penrith emblem after a public competition won by a graphic artist from Emu Plains named Deidre Copeland.

In 1966 word was out that the New South Wales Rugby League in 1967 would introduce two new teams to the Sydney premiership. There were three teams vying for the two proposed slots, Penrith, Cronulla-Sutherland, and the Wentworthville Magpies. Cronulla-Sutherland had been assured of one place, leaving Penrith and Wentworthville to fight it out for the other place. The NSWRL eventually settled on Penrith due to their location and a win in the 1966 Second Division title.

=== 1967 season (first season) ===
After admission to the competition in 1967, they came second last (11th) on the competition ladder finishing only ahead of fellow 1967 newcomers Cronulla-Sutherland. Hopes were raised in 1968 under new Captain-Coach Bob Boland when they won the pre-season competition and finished 8th, but this improvement proved to be short-lived.

=== 1985 season (first finals appearance) ===
Penrith had trouble attracting the sort of experienced players they knew they needed, and although they always had good junior talent coming through, they did not get the on-field leadership they needed. Penrith needed to wait until they could develop their own 'stars'. They consequently struggled for almost 20 years before finally reaching their first finals series in 1985 with a team boasting new local star Greg Alexander and captained by Royce Simmons.

=== 1988–1991 seasons (first grand finals) ===
Penrith developed a strong team in the late 80s and started to build momentum. They made their first Grand Final appearance in 1990 with a team boasting notable players Greg Alexander, John Cartwright, Brad Fittler and Mark Geyer only to be beaten by the Canberra Raiders 18–14. The next year Penrith met Canberra again in the Grand Final, this time winning 19–12, including two tries by Royce Simmons the former team captain in his last game. They went on to play Wigan in England for the 1991 World Club Challenge but were beaten by the British champions 21–4.

=== 1992–1995 seasons (downfall) ===
Their reign was short-lived as in 1992 tragedy struck the club when the younger brother of Captain Greg Alexander, Ben, died in a car accident on June 21, 1992. Greg and close family friends Mark Geyer and Brad Fittler left the club soon after (Fittler left after the 1995 season as Penrith had signed with Super League) as well as coach Phil Gould who left midway through the 1994 season.

Penrith were coached by former player and club captain Royce Simmons starting with the last six games in 1994 until the end of 2001.

=== 1997–2000 seasons (back to finals) ===
They made the finals during the 1997 Super League season.

The Panthers began the 1998 NRL Season with 2 wins from 5, to sit in the top 10, however, they would go on to win only 6 of their remaining 19 games to sit in 14th place out of 20, in doing so, setting an unwanted record for conceding the equal biggest choke in NRL history, against the Cowboys in Round 12, where they led 26-0, before losing 28-36 in Bluebet Stadium In 2000, the Panthers finished in 5th place where they were defeated 28–10 by the Parramatta Eels in the elimination semi-final.

=== 2001–2004 season (build to a premiership) ===
In the 2001 NRL season, Penrith came last on the competition ladder. The same year was Royce Simmons' last season as coach for Penrith, and he was replaced by John Lang from Cronulla in 2002, where they finished 12th. Their last game of 2002 showed hope as they proceeded to thrash the Northern Eagles, knocking them out of the final eight.

2002 showed the promise that was to come the next year. With the signing of Preston Campbell and Joe Galuvao, the side fired in 2003. Coming off 3 early season losses, they proceeded to lose only 3 other games for the rest of the competition with the local hero, Rhys Wesser scoring a new club record 25 tries. Penrith finished as Minor Premiers after convincingly accounting for the Parramatta Eels in the last round of competition. In the Finals series Penrith beat the Brisbane Broncos and New Zealand Warriors to reach the 2003 NRL grand final. Entering the match as underdogs, Penrith defeated the Roosters 18–6, with winger Luke Rooney scoring two tries. Hooker Luke Priddis, the other try-scorer for the Panthers, received the Clive Churchill Medal. The game is also remembered for a spectacular tackle by Scott Sattler in the 2nd Half, where he ran down and tackled Roosters winger Todd Byrne, who was sprinting down the left wing for an almost certain try. Penrith lost the 2004 World Club Challenge in the following pre-season, with the Bradford Bulls defeating them 22–4 in sub-zero temperatures. Penrith did however rally after that loss and once again qualified for the NRL semi-final series by finishing fourth and defeating St. George in the first week of the semi-finals before being knocked out by Canterbury-Bankstown in the grand final qualifier two weeks later.

=== 2005–2009 season (continued failures) ===
Penrith then just failed to qualify for the Top 8 in 2005 finishing two points out and in 10th spot on percentages. They endured another below-par season in 2006 this time falling well short of the finals finishing the year in 12th position. The 2007 season turned out to be a poor one for the Panthers, they won only eight games, finished last and "won" the wooden-spoon for the second time in six years after losing to the New Zealand Warriors in the last round of the regular season competition.

In 2008, Penrith improved four spots on their 2007 performance by finishing in 12th spot out of 16 teams in the NRL competition with 10 wins, one draw and 13 losses. In 2009 they finished the season in 11th spot out of 16 teams in the NRL competition with 11 wins, one draw and 12 losses.

In 2009, Penrith finished 11th. In round 21 of the 2009 NRL season, Penrith drew with the New Zealand Warriors 32–32 the 2nd highest drawn NRL game of all time.

=== 2010 season (brief finals appearance) ===
In 2010, Penrith had an excellent season, finishing in 2nd place in the ladder out of the 16 teams, with 16 wins and 9 losses. However, in the first round of the Finals series, they lost 24–22 at home to the Canberra Raiders and were knocked out in the second round when they lost 34–12 to the Sydney Roosters.

Michael Gordon played very well in that year, setting two new club records. In round 24, against the South Sydney Rabbitohs, he set a new club record for most points scored in one game: 30. By the end of the final game of the regular season, game 24, round 26, he had also set a new club record for the most points scored in one season at 270.

=== 2011–2013 seasons (rebuilding the club) ===
After a 2010 season where the club went above and beyond expectations, they were looking to starting the new season on a high. It wasn't to be, however, when they were thumped by Newcastle at the newly named Centrebet Stadium, 42–8. While round 2 went a lot better for the team, beating rivals the Eels at Parramatta Stadium 20–6, the year was marked by inconsistency as they finished 12th on the ladder.

In 2011, following another terrible start to the season, the Penrith board decided to sever ties with coach Matthew Elliot at season's end. On 20 June 2011 he stepped down as coach and that same day Steve Georgallis was appointed caretaker coach for the remainder of the season. On 29 June Ivan Cleary was announced as coach for the next 3 seasons, with Georgallis staying as assistant coach for the remainder of the season.

2012 was again a disappointing year for Penrith, finishing second last with an 8–16 record. However, the club discovered some new talent in the form of winger Josh Mansour, a candidate for Rookie of the Year, as well as fullback Lachlan Coote's successful move to five-eighth.

2013 began poorly for the Penrith; after a first up win against the Canberra Raiders, they went on to lose their next five games. However, a more inspired performance against the Parramatta Eels in round 7, where they won 44–12, was a trigger for a strong run; four wins from five games to see Penrith move into the top eight of the competition. The four wins included a 12–10 victory over the reigning premiers, Melbourne Storm, and a 64–6 thrashing of the New Zealand Warriors. However, after a year with mixed results, Penrith finished in tenth position, one win out of the top eight. At the end of the season, the likes of Luke Walsh, Lachlan Coote, Mose Masoe and Brad Tighe departed.

A playing roster overhaul saw the arrival of big name players such as Jamie Soward, Peter Wallace, Jamal Idris, Tyrone Peachey and Elijah Taylor at Penrith, while Matt Moylan took the vacant fullback role left by the departed Lachlan Coote.

=== 2014 season (big signings paid off) ===
The 2014 NRL season was a good year for Penrith as they qualified for the finals and made it to the preliminary final before losing to the Bulldogs 18–12.

=== 2015 season (continued rebuilding phase) ===
In the 2015 NRL season, Penrith endured a horror year on the field finishing second last. Penrith defeated bottom placed Newcastle in the final game of the season to avoid the wooden spoon.

=== 2016–2018 seasons (multiple finals appearances) ===
The Penrith Panthers celebrated their 50th year in the NRL in 2016. Penrith started the season with 7 wins and 9 losses, they then finished the season winning 7 from 8 games to finish in 6th. In week 1 of the finals they defeated Canterbury 28-12, the next week Penrith were knocked out by Canberra losing 12–22.

In 2017, Penrith finished 7th on the NRL Premiership table and qualified for the finals. Penrith defeated Manly in week one of the finals 22–10 and then were defeated by Brisbane the following week 13–6 at Suncorp Stadium thus eliminating them from the competition. The Penrith reserve grade side fared much better, firstly winning the Intrust Super Premiership by defeating Wyong 20-12 and then defeating the PNG Hunters the following week in the NRL State Championship final 42-18.

In 2018, Penrith finished 5th on the table at the end of the regular season during which coach Anthony Griffin was sacked four weeks before the finals series after falling out with Phil Gould. Griffin was then replaced by Cameron Ciraldo for the remainder of the season. In week one of the finals, Penrith easily accounted for the New Zealand Warriors to set up a clash with Cronulla. Although both clubs were admitted into the competition in 1967 this would provide the first meeting between the two clubs in a finals match. In a tight game, Cronulla defeated Penrith 21–20 ending their season.

=== 2019 season (high expectations, low results) ===
Before the commencement of the 2019 NRL season, Penrith were predicted by many to challenge for the premiership and reach the finals. Penrith got off to a bad start with the club winning only 2 of their first 10 matches leaving the team bottom of the table. Penrith would then go on to win their next 7 games in a row leaving them just outside the finals places. In a must win game against the Sydney Roosters in round 24, Penrith lost the match 22-6 at the Sydney Cricket Ground which meant that the club would miss out on the finals series for the first time since 2015.

=== 2020–2021 season (Back-to-back grand final appearances, third premiership) ===
Penrith started the 2020 NRL season with three wins and a draw before suffering a 16–10 loss to Parramatta. The club then went on a 15-game unbeaten run to claim the 2020 Minor Premiership, only the third time in the club's history they had achieved this feat.

Penrith would go on to reach the 2020 NRL Grand Final after going 17 games unbeaten throughout the year and in the finals. The opponents in the grand final were Melbourne who raced out to a 22–0 lead at half-time. Penrith came back in the second half of the game but lost the grand final 26–20 at Stadium Australia.

At the start of the 2021 NRL season, Penrith became the first team in Rugby League History to win their opening two games without conceding a point as they beat North Queensland 24–0 and then defeated Canterbury 28-0.

In round 4 of the 2021 NRL season, Penrith defeated Manly-Warringah 46–6 at Brookvale Oval inflicting Manly's worst ever home defeat. The win also meant that Penrith had their best start to a season since 1997 when they won their opening four games in that year. It extended Penrith's longest away winning streak to 10 which is tied in 1st all time in the NRL.

In round 5 of 2021 NRL season, Penrith defeated Canberra 30–10 at Penrith Stadium. It was Penrith's best start to a season in their history. Penrith also became the first team to win 20 straight regular season games.

In round 6 of 2021 NRL season, Penrith defeated Brisbane 20–12 at Lang Park. It continued Penrith's best start to a season, And also became the first team to win 21 straight regular season games. This win also made Penrith hold the record for most consecutive away wins (11).

The club would finish the 2021 regular season in second place, equal on points with Minor Premiers Melbourne but missed out on first place due to points differential. Penrith would then lose their opening match of the 2021 finals series losing to South Sydney 16–10.

In the week two elimination final, Penrith played against Parramatta for the first time in the finals since 2000. In the lowest scoring game of the year, Penrith won the match 8–6. In the aftermath, the club was fined $25,000 by the NRL after allegedly breaching the rules of the game in their victory over Parramatta. In a crucial part of the match with Parramatta on the attack, Penrith trainer Pete Green ran onto the field which stopped play as he attended to hooker Mitch Kenny in the 76th minute. The NRL rules state that trainers must not signal to the referee to stop play until an initial assessment has been performed, which was not done, and only then it should be stopped for serious injury.

In the 2021 preliminary final, Penrith gained revenge against Melbourne by winning the match 10–6 and booking a place in the 2021 NRL Grand Final against South Sydney.

Penrith met South Sydney in the 2021 NRL Grand Final and looked to redeem their loss in the previous years' Grand Final. The Penrith club finished the game in a thrilling 14–12 victory to claim their third premiership in the club's history with Co-Captain Nathan Cleary securing the Clive Churchill Medal for his outstanding performance in the match.

On 8 October, the Penrith club were placed under investigation by the NRL after photos emerged which showed that the Provan-Summons Trophy had been damaged. The photos showed that the trophy had been separated from the base and surrounding wreath. Another image on social media also showed the trophy being treated as a baby with the bronzed artwork being carried around in a stroller. The following week, it was announced that the Penrith players had been cleared of any wrongdoing in relation to the broken trophy. It was revealed that the trophy had been broken by a fan who had accidentally knocked it off the table which caused the trophy to break off at the base. On 19 October 2021, Nathan Cleary and Stephen Crichton were handed proposed fines of $7000 and $4000 by the NRL along with breach notices. This was in relation to both players caught on social media acting in a disrespectful manner toward the NRL Telstra Premiership Trophy. The NRL alleged Cleary and Crichton showed disrespect towards the individuals depicted in the iconic moment on the Trophy. On the same day, Tyrone May was stood down by the club and handed a breach notice along with a proposed fine of $7500. The NRL alleged May acted contrary to the best interests of the game for posting and being part of social media posts which do not align with the values of the game. On the 3 November 2021, Tyrone May was terminated with immediate effect following the grand final antics, as well as to previous breaches dating back to 2019. “As a club we understand our responsibilities to the game, our corporate partners, our members and fans, and the wider Rugby League community," Panthers CEO Brian Fletcher said. "The Board observed due process in this matter and considered all relevant factors before reaching its final decision. "Panthers will coordinate with the NRL to ensure Tyrone receives access to any support services he needs moving forward."

=== 2022–2024 (Dynasty, Further Premierships) ===
Penrith started the 2022 NRL season in strong fashion winning their opening eight matches in a row. In round 9, the club was defeated 22–20 by Parramatta at Penrith Stadium which ended their 21-game winning streak at the ground that stretched all the way back to the 2019 NRL season.

In round 23 against South Sydney, Penrith secured their fourth minor premiership by winning 26–22 at Stadium Australia. Penrith would then go on to win both their finals matches against Parramatta and South Sydney respectively to reach the 2022 NRL Grand Final.

In the final, Penrith took an 18–0 lead at half-time against Parramatta before running out winners 28–12 to secure their second consecutive title and becoming only the second team after the Sydney Roosters to win back to back titles in the NRL era.

Following the grand final victory, the Penrith club came under scrutiny from sections of the media for their behaviour after the premiership win with James Fisher-Harris and Jarome Luai coming under the most criticism for their comments directed towards Parramatta.

Before the start of the 2023 NRL season, Penrith played against the Super League champions St Helens R.F.C. in the 2023 World Club Challenge. Penrith went into the game as heavy favourites but suffered a shock 13–12 defeat in golden point extra-time.

At the conclusion of the 2023 regular season, Penrith claimed their second Minor Premiership in a row and their fifth overall as they defeated North Queensland 44–12 to finish ahead of Brisbane on for and against. Penrith won their third straight premiership, and fifth overall, by beating the Brisbane Broncos 26–24 in the 2023 Grand Final after coming back from being 16 points down in the final 20 minutes. Ahead of the 2024 NRL season, Penrith travelled to England for their 2024 World Club Challenge final against Wigan. Penrith would lose the match 16–12.

On 6 October 2024, Penrith captured their fourth successive NRL premiership by defeating the Melbourne Storm in the Grand Final to the 2024 NRL season. This win helped them recover from their heartbreaking defeat to the Storm four years prior, in what was to be the first of five consecutive Grand Finals which they would contest during this run of successive championships, the likes of which is unprecedented in the history of top-tier salary-capped sports leagues worldwide.

=== 2025-2026 ===
Penrith began the 2025 NRL season in Las Vegas against the Cronulla-Sutherland Sharks. They won the match 28-22 at Allegiant Stadium in front of a crowd of 45,209. The club would then endure five consecutive losses. In round 2, against the Sydney Roosters, fullback Dylan Edwards suffered a groin injury which sidelined him for 3 weeks; he returned in round 6 against the Dolphins.

Penrith broke their losing streak with a win over the Roosters in round 7, and subsequently recorded one win, one loss, and a draw. Following their bye, the club suffered a defeat to the Newcastle Knights, leaving them last on the NRL ladder after 12 rounds. Penrith then produced a nine-match winning streak, reviving their season. The Panthers would lose back to back golden point extra-time matches against Canberra and Melbourne.

Despite this, Penrith would eventually qualify the finals, finishing 7th on the ladder. Penrith secured elimination final wins against the New Zealand Warriors and Canterbury-Bankstown Bulldogs, before losing 16-14 to the eventual premiers, the Brisbane Broncos.

Penrith began the 2026 NRL season by winning their first five matches. In round 6, the club conceded their first loss to the Canterbury-Bankstown Bulldogs 32-16. In round 7, hooker Mitch Kenny suffered a fractured fibula and syndesmosis injury before being hospitalised in Darwin, where the match was played. During each of the first 7 games, winger Tom Jenkins scored at least 2 tries, including 4 against the Sydney Roosters in Round 3, resulting in 16 tries after 7 rounds.

In Round 14, the Panthers recorded their biggest win in club history, defeating the Wests Tigers 68-0.

On September 6th, in a 38-10 win over the Wests Tigers in Round 27, Penrith won their 6th Minor Premiership for the first time since 2023. In this game, winger Tom Jenkins also equalled the single season NRL try scoring record of 30, with a first-half double. Penrith would eventually reach the preliminary final but suffered a shock loss to Newcastle who finished the previous season as wooden spooners. Newcastle had also played the match for over 40 minutes with 12 men on the field after Phoenix Crossland was sent off for a hip drop tackle on Nathan Cleary.

== Honours ==
Premierships (6)
1991, 2003, 2021, 2022, 2023, 2024

Runners-up (2)
1990, 2020

Minor Premierships (6)
1991, 2003, 2020, 2022, 2023, 2026

Reserve Grade (5)
1987, 2014, 2017, 2022, 2026

NRL State Championship (2)
2017, 2022

Jersey Flegg Cup (6)
1977, 1986, 2006, 2007, 2022, 2026

S.G. Ball Cup (7)
1977, 1981, 2000, 2006, 2016, 2018, 2022

Harold Matthews Cup (7)
1979, 1985, 1989, 2002, 2005, 2006, 2010

NYC Premiership (2)
2013, 2015

Flowers Memorial Pennant (5)
2014, 2015, 2018, 2022, 2026

Third Grade (1)
1978

Wills Cup (1)
1968

NSWRL Second Division (1)
1966

== Club Identity ==
=== Kit sponsors and manufacturers ===
Year	Kit Manufacturer	Major Sponsor	Back Top Sponsor	Sleeve Sponsor	Back Bottom Sponsor	Front Shorts Sponsor	Back Shorts Sponsor	Chest Sponsor
1976	Westmont							
1977	Westmont	Feeney						
1978-84	Westmont							
1985	Peerless	Alpha Micro						
1986-87	Peerless	2KA						
1988	Peerless	Penrith City						
1989	Peerless	Calphos						
1990	Peerless	Dahdah Uniforms						
1991-92	Peerless	Dahdah Uniforms		Triple M				
1993	Peerless	Dahdah Uniforms		2VS				
1994-95	Peerless	Prospect Electricity		2VS				
1996	Peerless	Tele Classifieds		-				
1997-98	Nike	-		Anset Australia				
1999	Classic	-		-				
2000-01	Classic	Sanyo		-				
2002-03	Classic	Sanyo		NTG				
2004	ISC	Sanyo		NTG				
2005	ISC	Sanyo		St Marys Leagues				
2006-07	ISC	Sanyo		Parkview				
2008	ISC	Sanyo		Nepean Motorgroup				
2009	ISC	Sanyo		Abcoe				
2010	ISC	Sanyo		Titan				
2011	ISC	Sanyo		OnSite				
2012	ISC	OAK		Cudo				
2013-2016	Asics	OAK		Hertz				
2017	Asics	OAK Plus		Hertz				
2018-19	Classic	OAK Plus		Hertz			KFC	ESQ
2020-21	Oneills	OAK Plus		Hertz		Turner Freeman Lawyers	KFC	ESQ
2022-23	Oneills	OAK Plus		Hertz		Turner Freeman Lawyers	KFC	Bluestone
2024-25	Oneills	MyPlace		Hertz	Allam	Turner Freeman Lawyers	KFC	Allam
2026	Oneills	MyPlaceIQ		Hertz	Allam	Turner Freeman Lawyers	KFC	Westfund
2027	Oneills	MyPlaceIQ	Picklebet	Hertz	Allam	Turner Freeman Lawyers	KFC	TBC

== Emblem and colours ==
Penrith Panthers Logos

1978–1990

1991–1999

2000–2012

2013–2018

2019-Present

60th Anniversary 2026

Penrith's uniform colours in the 1966 NSWRL Second Division and earlier years were blue and white but due to the Cronulla-Sutherland side registering a predominantly blue jersey design first, and with Newtown, Canterbury, Eastern Suburbs and Parramatta also displaying various shades of blue, Penrith went in search of an alternative. A decision was made to change their colours to Brown with a white V. This decision subsequently earned them the affectionate name of the "Chocolate Soldiers" thanks to radio commentator Frank Hyde who wrote in the Penrith Club journal "these chocolate soldiers from out west – they don't melt!".

The team had been referred to as the 'Panthers' as early as 1970.

In 1974 Penrith changed their strip to a jerseys with brown and white vertical bars and again in 1991 they changed the colours to black with white, red, yellow and green stripes (drawing another confectionery-related nickname, the Liquorice Allsorts) until 1997 when Super League had all new jerseys made by Nike. The yellow was all but removed from the jersey at this stage. Then in 2000 they changed the colours once more to black, rust red, teal green and white. In 2004 the design of the jersey changed once more. On Thursday, 23 November 2006 the club launched a new 'alternate/away' jersey predominantly white in colour as a stark contrast to its main design.

Just before Christmas 2007 the Panthers launched a new 'home' jersey, which was predominantly black with light grey claw marks on either side at the front and back. For Season 2010, the Panthers launched a predominantly teal away jersey, connected with the away jersey from their 03 and 04 seasons. With their official colours still black, teal, green and rust red the alternate jersey was chosen to represent their secondary colour. The inception of teal into the colour palette of Panthers links directly back to the unique colour their 2nd division jerseys had before brown and white.

In late October 2010, the Panthers announced that rust would no longer be a secondary colour for the club. A new jersey was also launched, black with grey claw marks on either side. The club's teal jersey was also scratched in Round 4, 2011, when a new white jersey with grey claw marks and teal and black stripes was announced the club's new alternate jersey.

For the 2014 season the Panthers wore a redesigned black home jersey while the white away jersey prominently displayed the new club logo. The pink jersey was also retained as a 3rd alternate strip, and used for Women in League and Breast Cancer Awareness rounds, or when both strips would clash with the opposing side. There was also a special Indigenous Jersey, worn in round 23 for the Indigenous round.

The Penrith Panthers unveiled a 50th anniversary logo to be used in 2016.

In 2017, Penrith decided to revert to their Liquorice Allsorts jersey from the 1990s. The club had asked the fans in 2016 what jersey design they wanted and the majority voted for a return of the jersey the club won its first premiership in. Panthers executive general manager Phil Gould said "This is the jersey you wanted. We will respect our past as we set about creating our future – and this is the jersey that will carry us forward. You know in 50 years here at Panthers we've had over 50 jerseys. Now wouldn't it be nice to have just one jersey for the next 50 years? I don't know if that is possible but this is where we need to start".

Following their elimination from the 2018 finals, on 26 September 2018, the Panthers introduced a re-coloured logo to take effect in 2019, completely removing teal.

After resting the pink jerseys for the 2018 and 2019 seasons, the Panthers installed them as the permanent away jerseys from 2021 onwards. In 2024, they became the first team to both play in and win a grand final wearing pink, as they were forced to wear their away jerseys due to opponents Melbourne finishing above them in the season. In 2025, the Panthers released their Las Vegas Alternate Jersey, a black and gold version their regular home jersey.

=== Primary jerseys ===
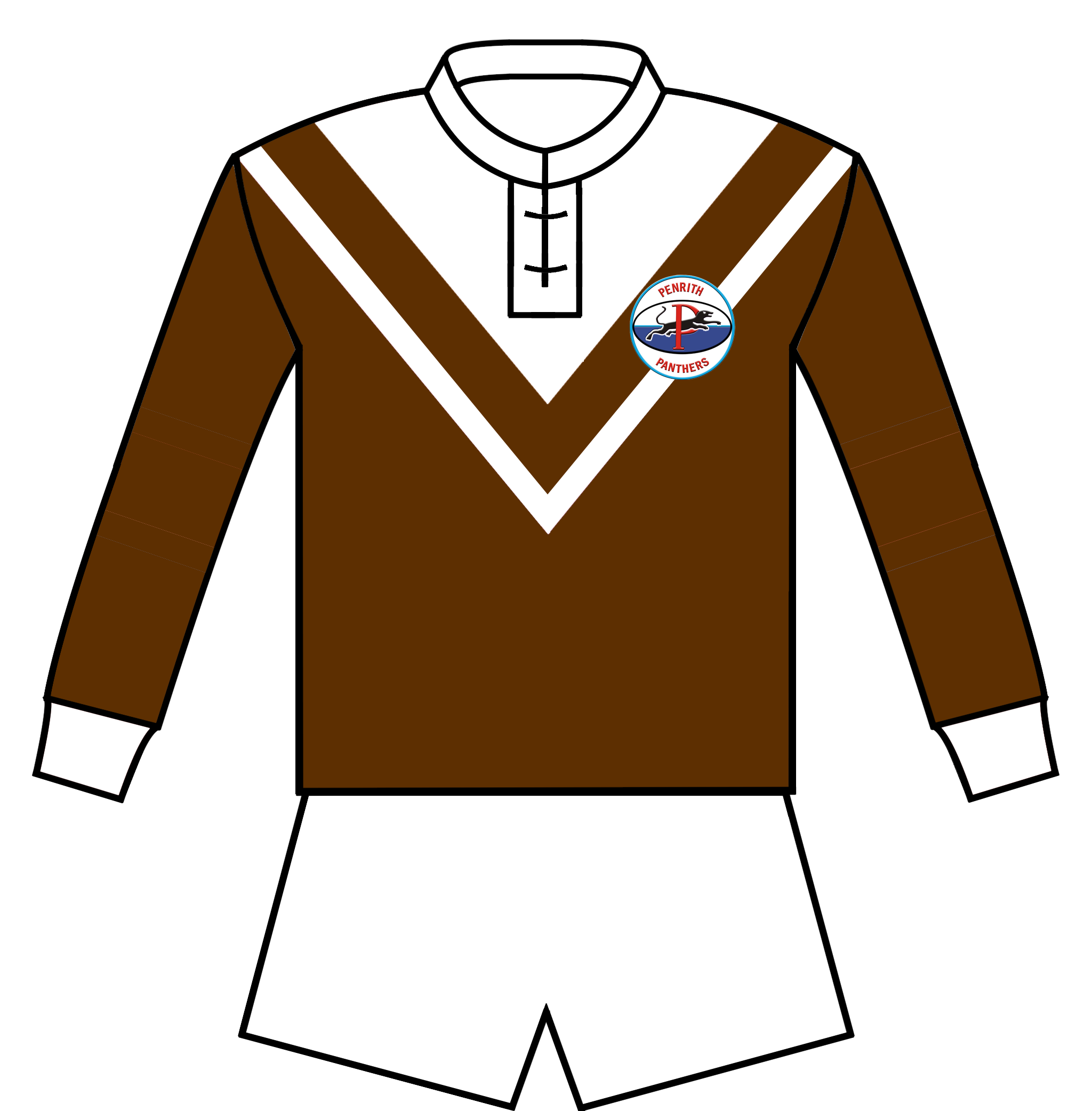
Primary (1967–1969, 1972)

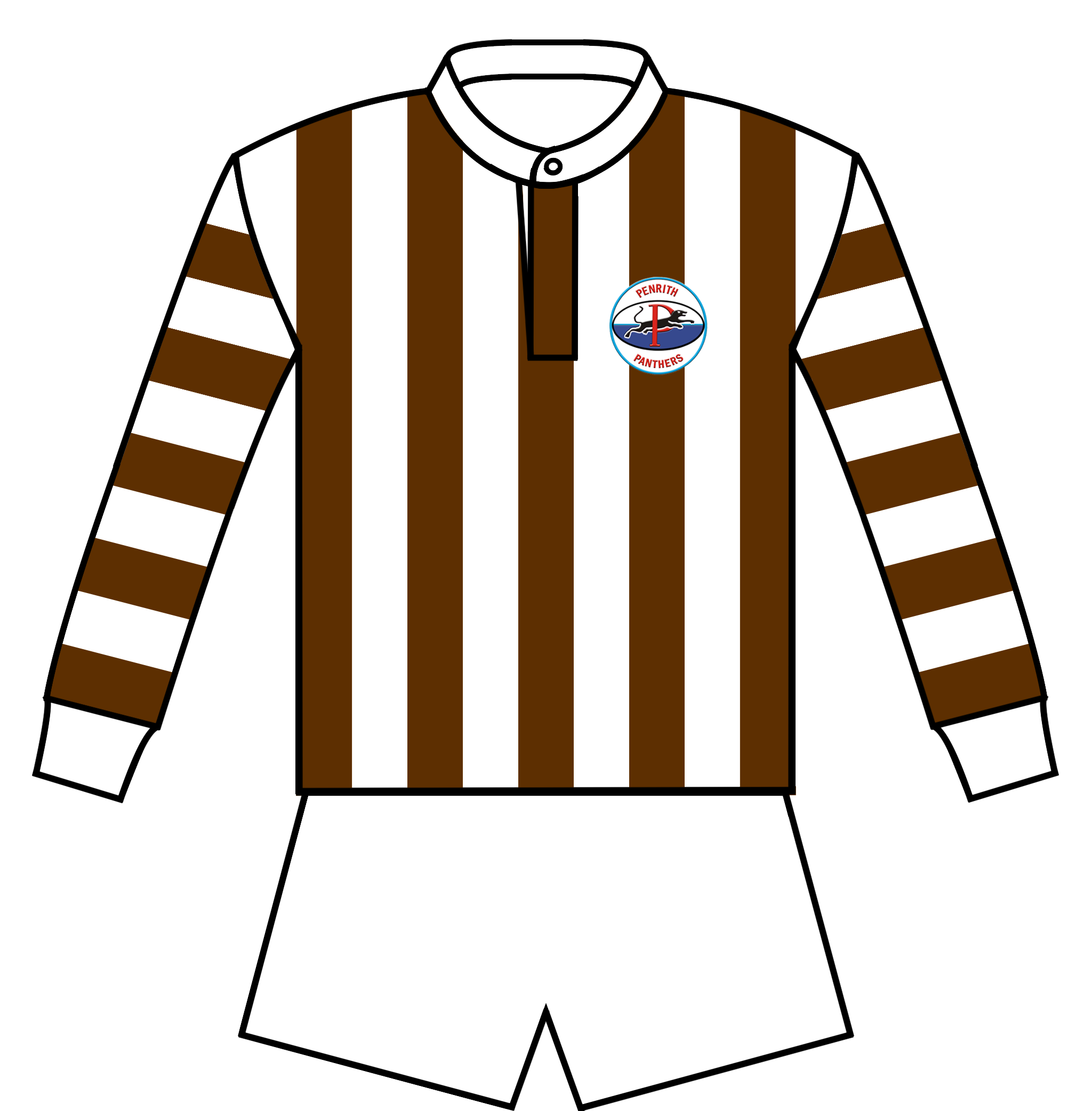
Primary (1970)

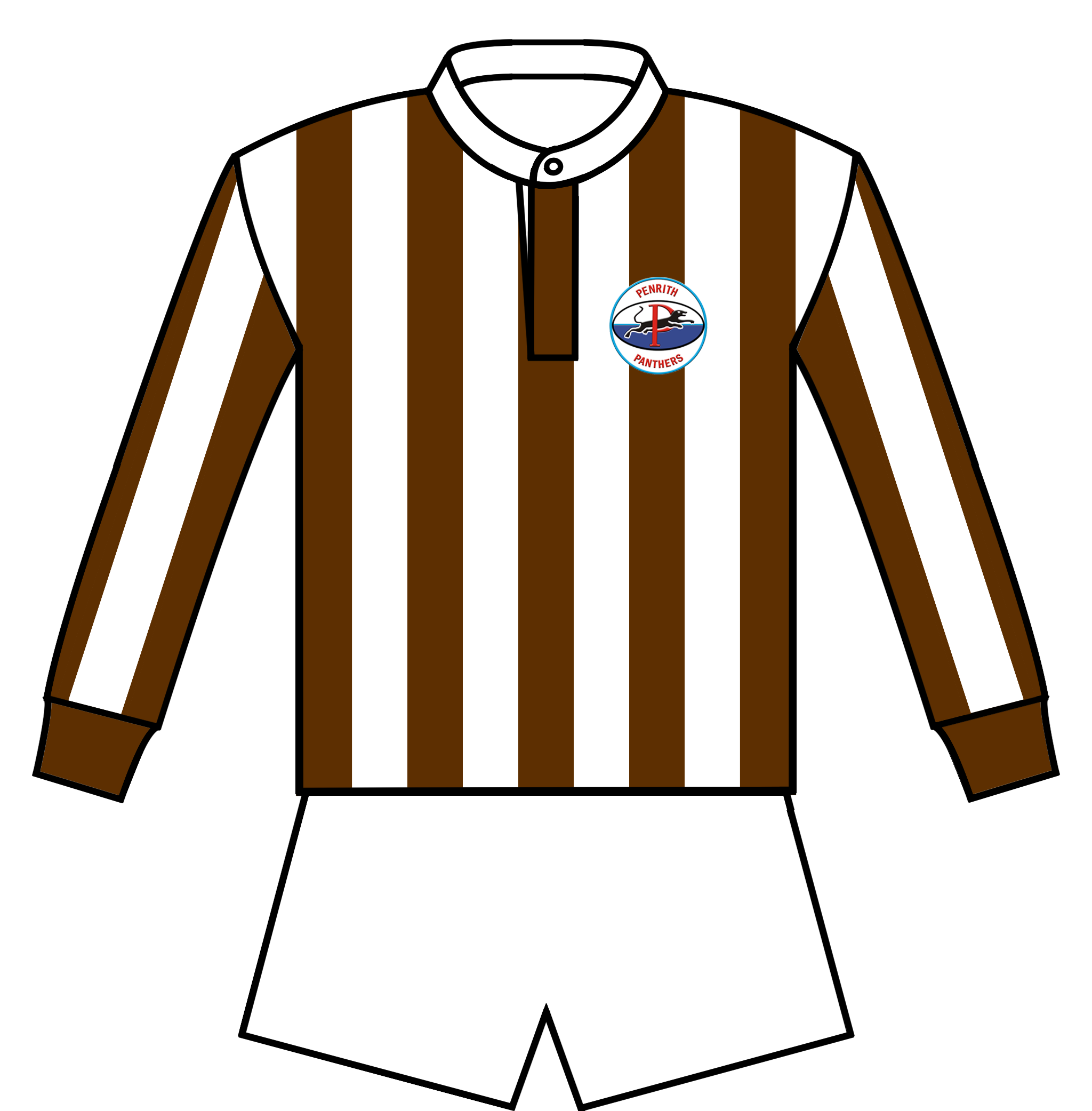
Primary (1971, 1973–1975)

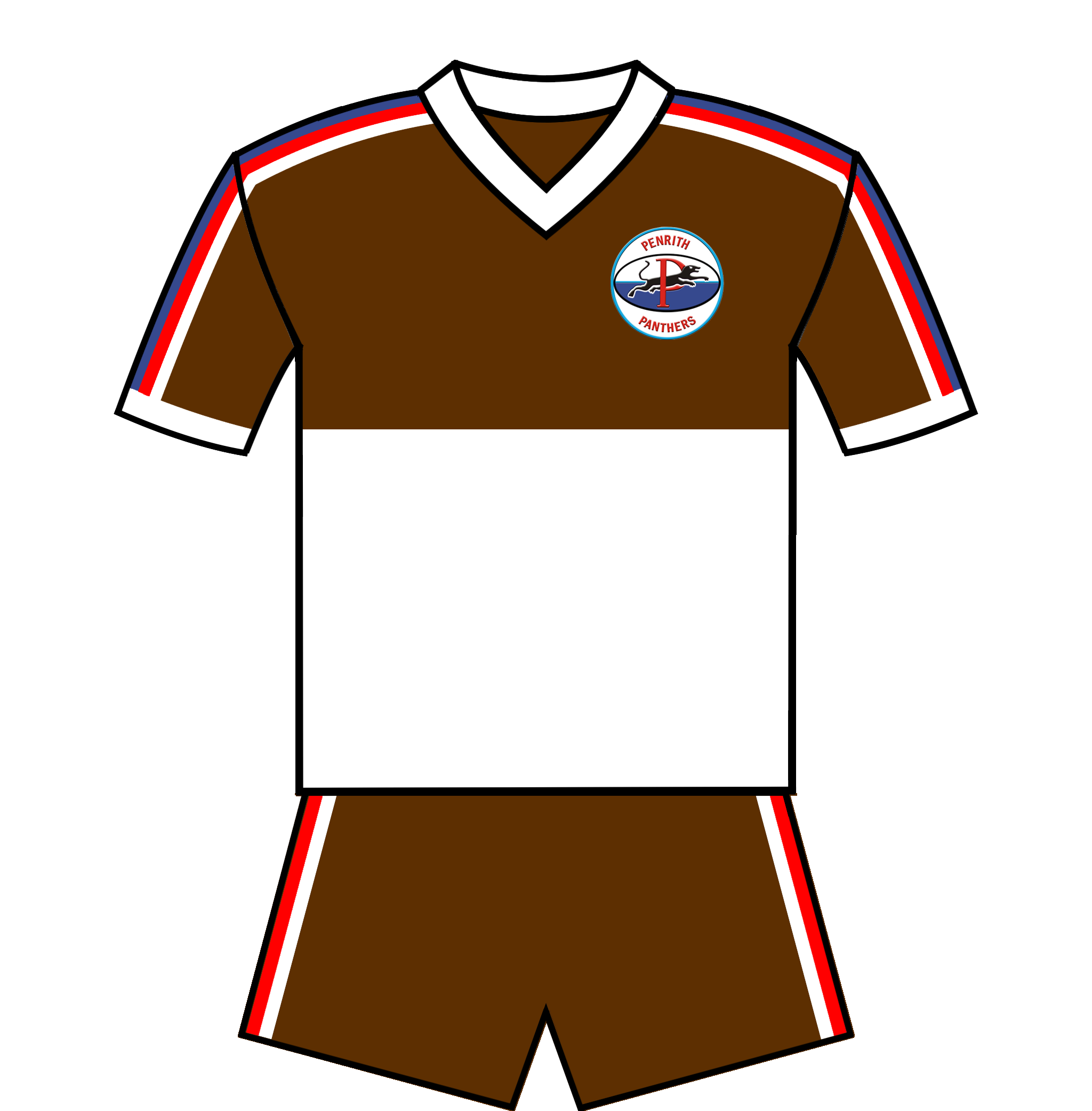
Primary (1976–1978)

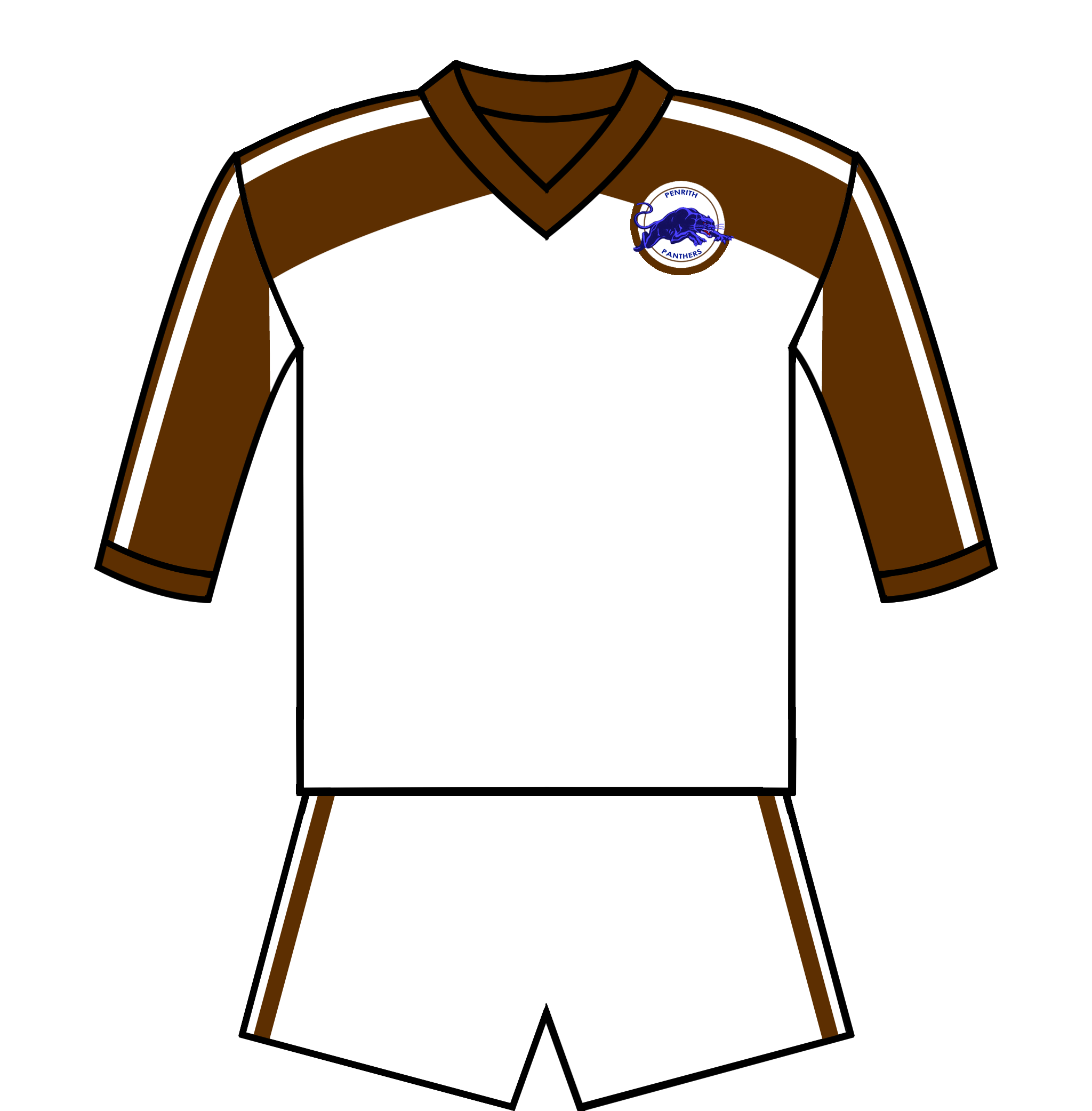
Primary (1979)

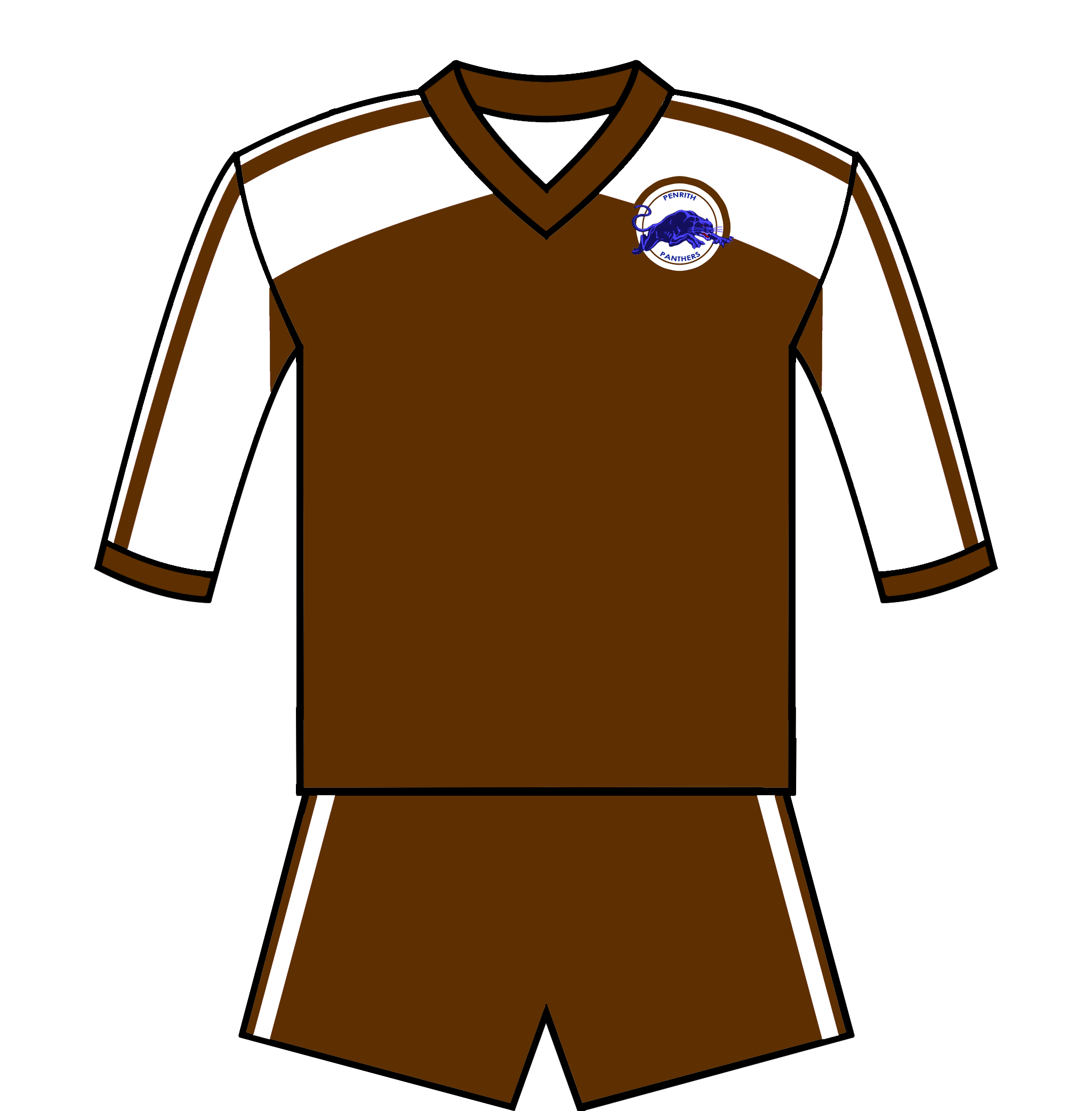
Primary (1980–1984)

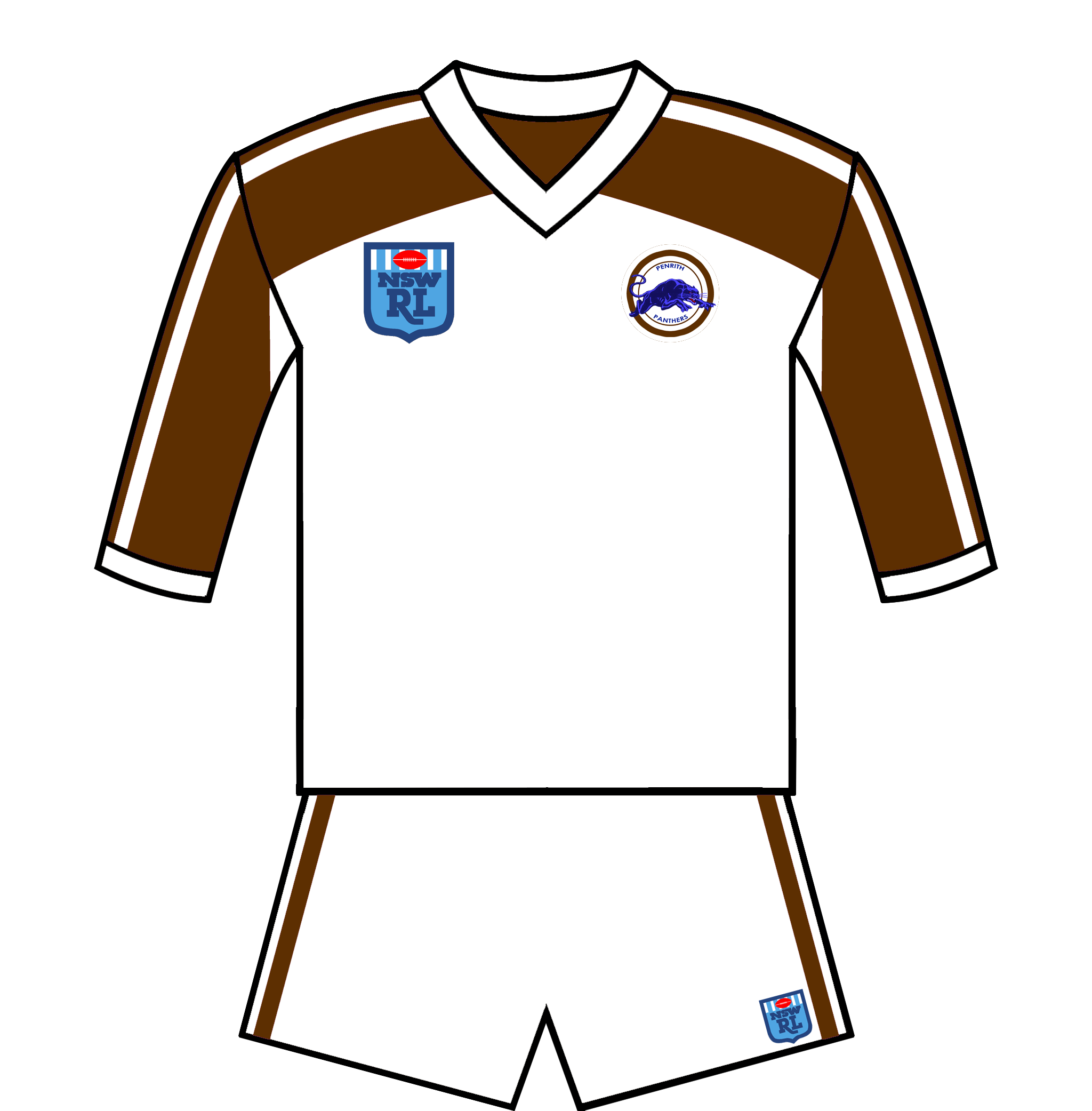
Primary (1985–1990)

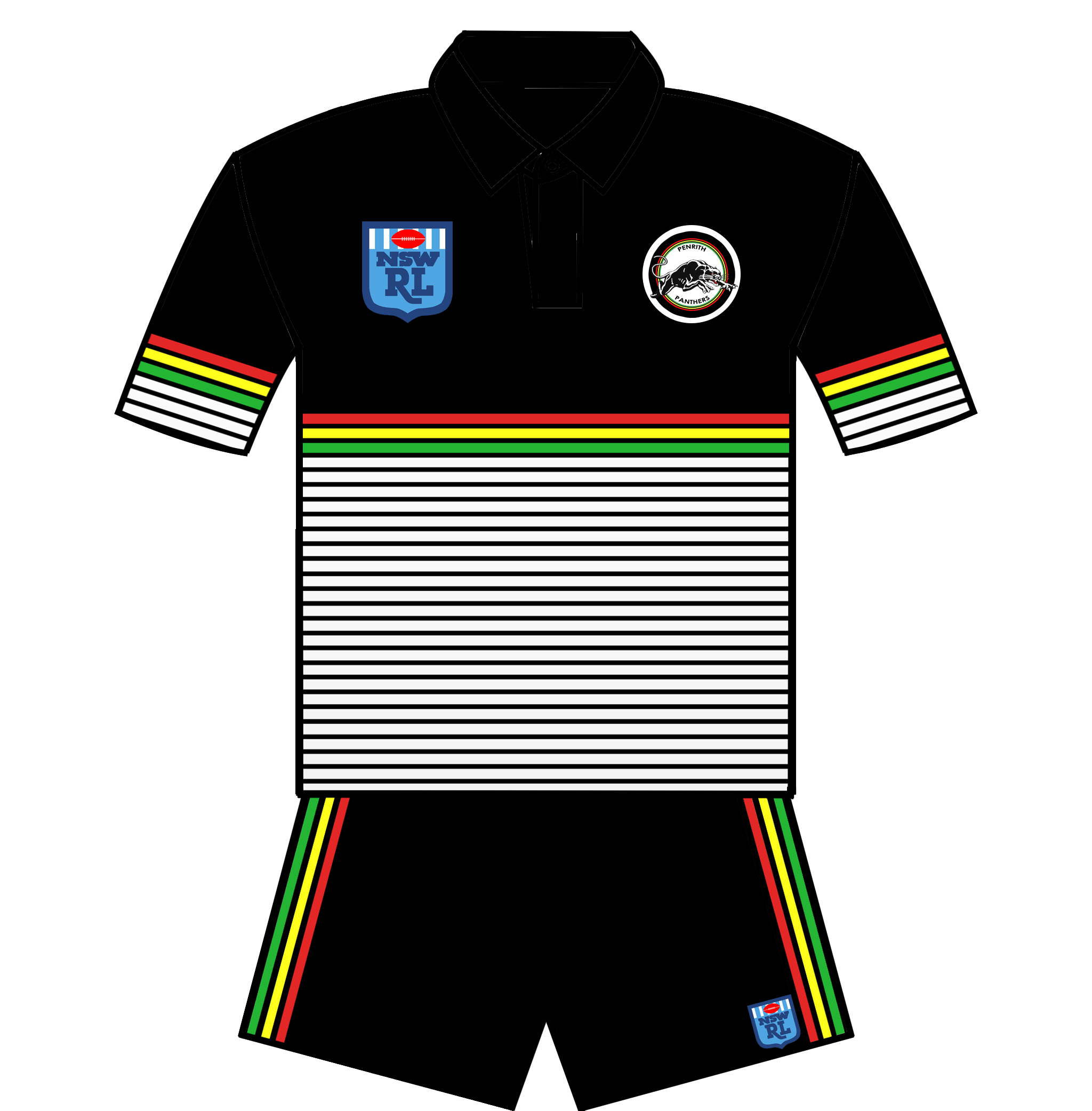
Primary (1991–1996)

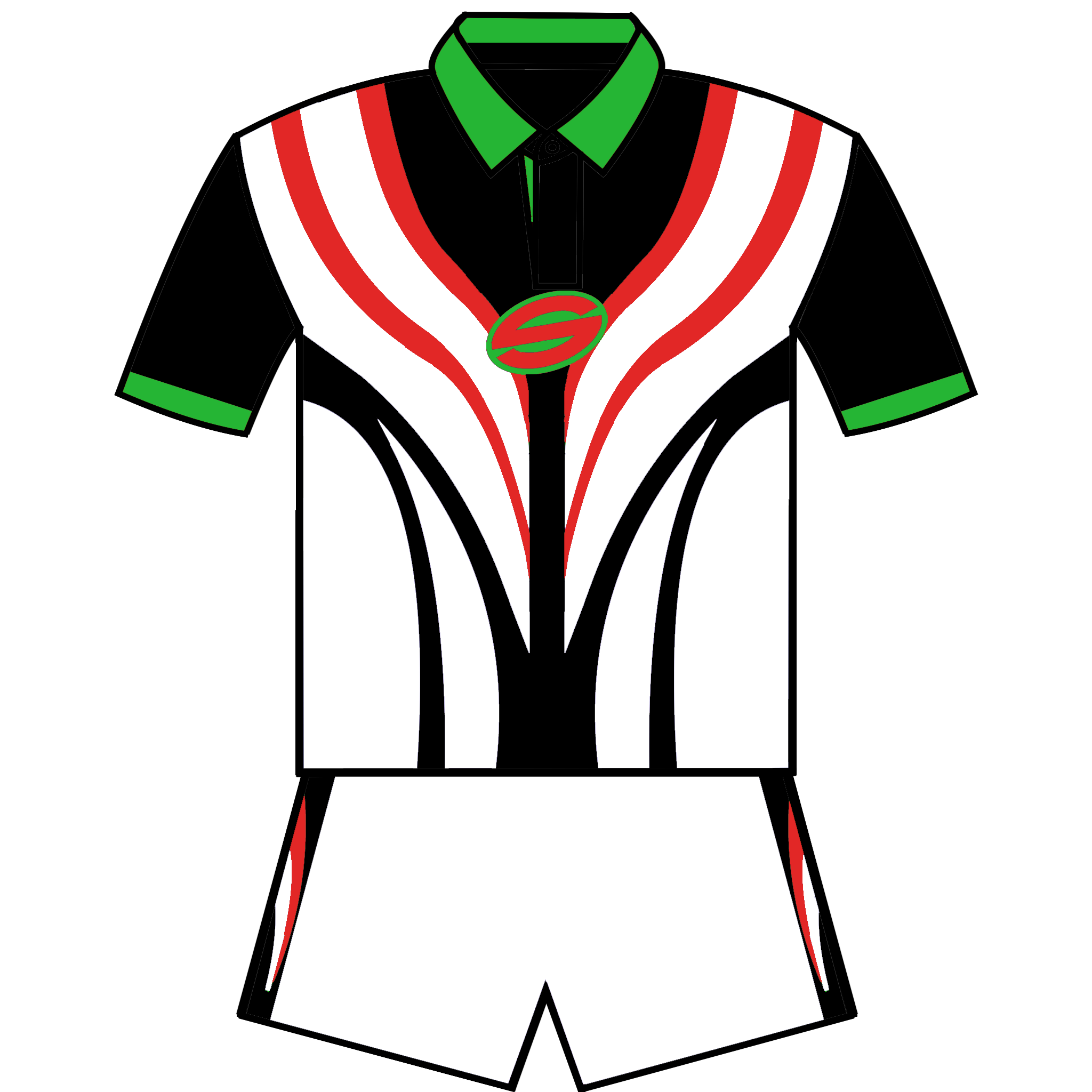
Primary (1997–1999)

Primary (2016)

Primary (2017–2018)

Primary (2019–present)

=== Alternate jerseys ===
Alternate (1991–1994)

Alternate (1995–1996)

Alternate (2000–2002)

Alternate (2007–2009)

Alternate (2016)

Alternate (2017–2018)

Alternate (2019)

Pink Panthers (2021-present)

=== Heritage jerseys ===
Heritage (2011)

Heritage (2012)

'1967' Heritage (2016)

'1991' Heritage (2016)

'2003' Heritage (2016)

=== Special jerseys ===
40th Anniversary (2006)

Pink Panthers (2009-2011)

Pink Panthers (2013-2015)

Pink Panthers (2016)

Pink Panthers (2017)

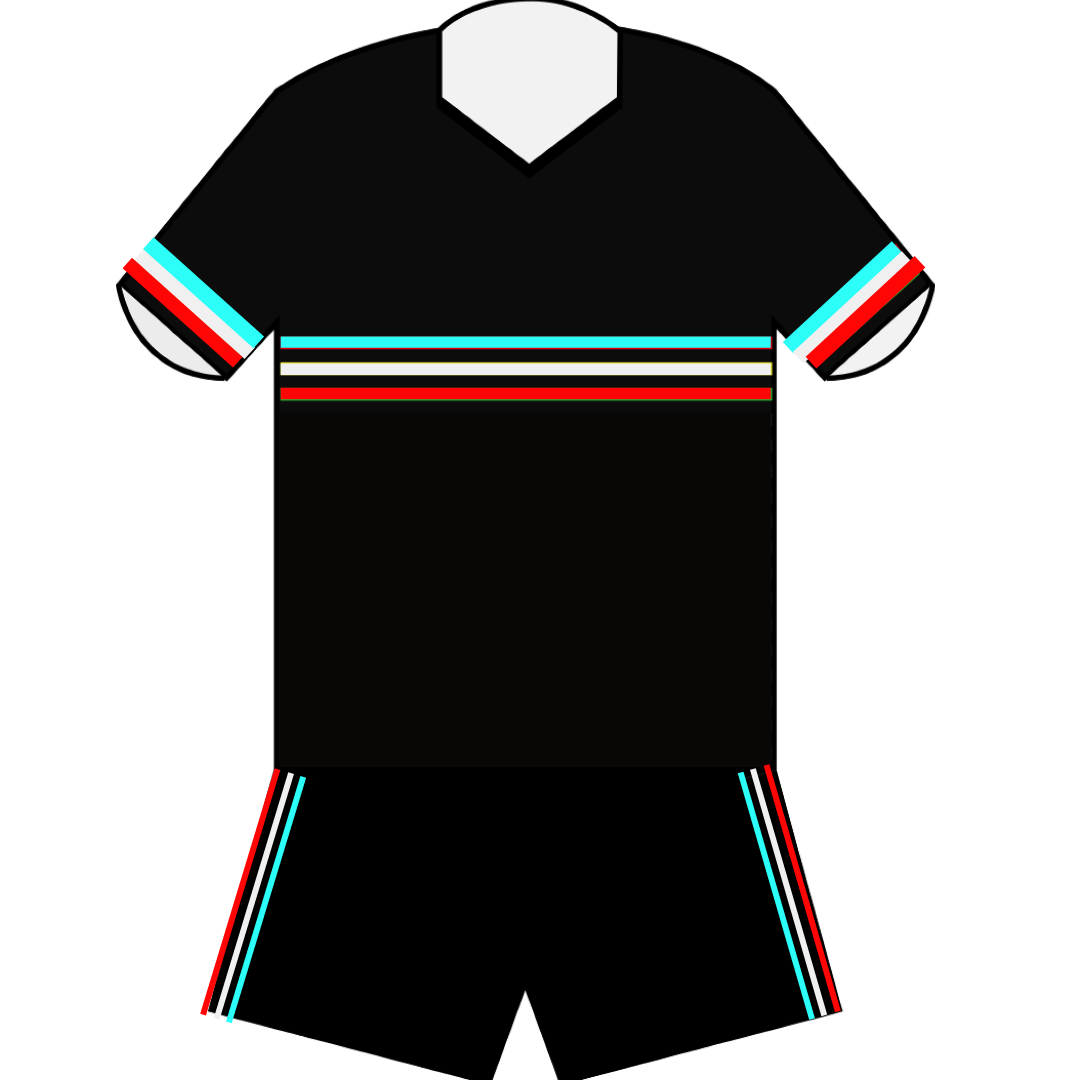
2003 20th Anniversary (2023)

=== Nines jerseys ===
NRL Nines (2017)

Pink Panthers (2020)

== Ground ==
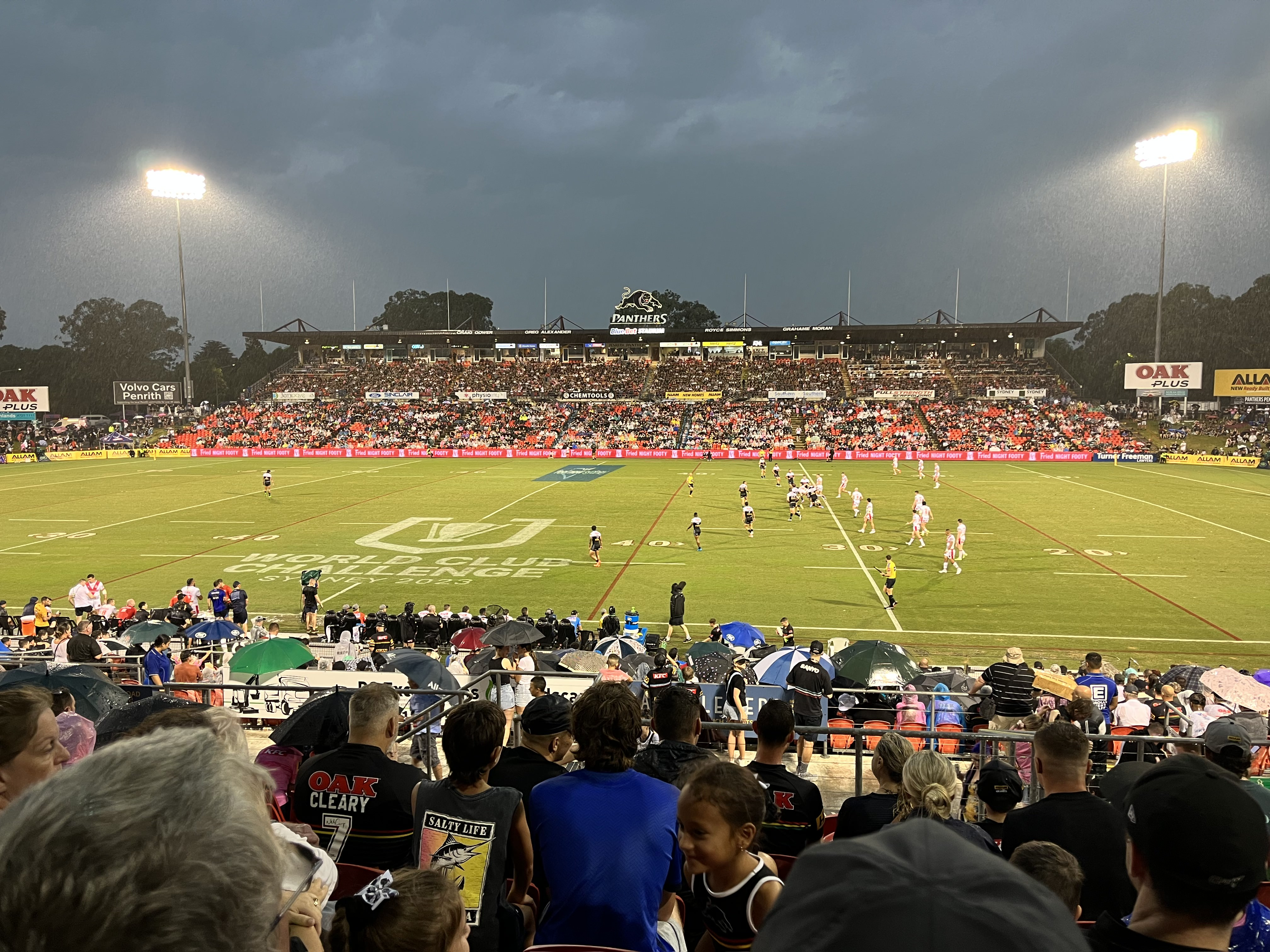
Penrith Stadium during the 2023 World Club Challenge.

The Panthers have played their home games at Penrith Stadium since their entry into the NSWRFL in 1967. Due to renovations and a complete stadium upgrade scheduled to take place during the 2025 and 2026 seasons. The Panthers will play at CommBank Stadium in Parramatta, before returning to the new Penrith Stadium (named HelloWorld Stadium for sponsorship purposes) in 2027.

== Reserve and junior teams ==
Penrith Panthers Reserve and Junior Teams
Competition	Classification	Titles (Last)
NSW Cup	Reserve Grade	5 (2026)
Jersey Flegg Cup	U/21	6 (2026)
S. G. Ball Cup	U/19	7 (2022)
Harold Matthews Cup	U/16	7 (2010)
NSW Women's Premiership	Women's Reserve Grade	0
Tarsha Gale Cup	Women's U/19	1 (2017)
Lisa Fiaola Cup	Women's U/17	0

The club's Juniors district is the largest Rugby League district in the world, with 8500 players and 580 teams split across all age levels in Penrith and Districts Junior Rugby League. The district encompasses the area between Blacktown, Katoomba, Hawkesbury and Wallacia.

Starting in the early 2010's, the club expanded their focus further west of the Blue Mountains, investing in the surrounding areas of Bathurst, Forbes and Dubbo to expand their potential selection pool. This investment, as well as a greater focus on the Penrith Junior District resulted in an increase from five out of twenty five local players in 2012 to eleven of seventeen in the 2020 Grand Final.

== Penrith Panthers Leagues Club ==
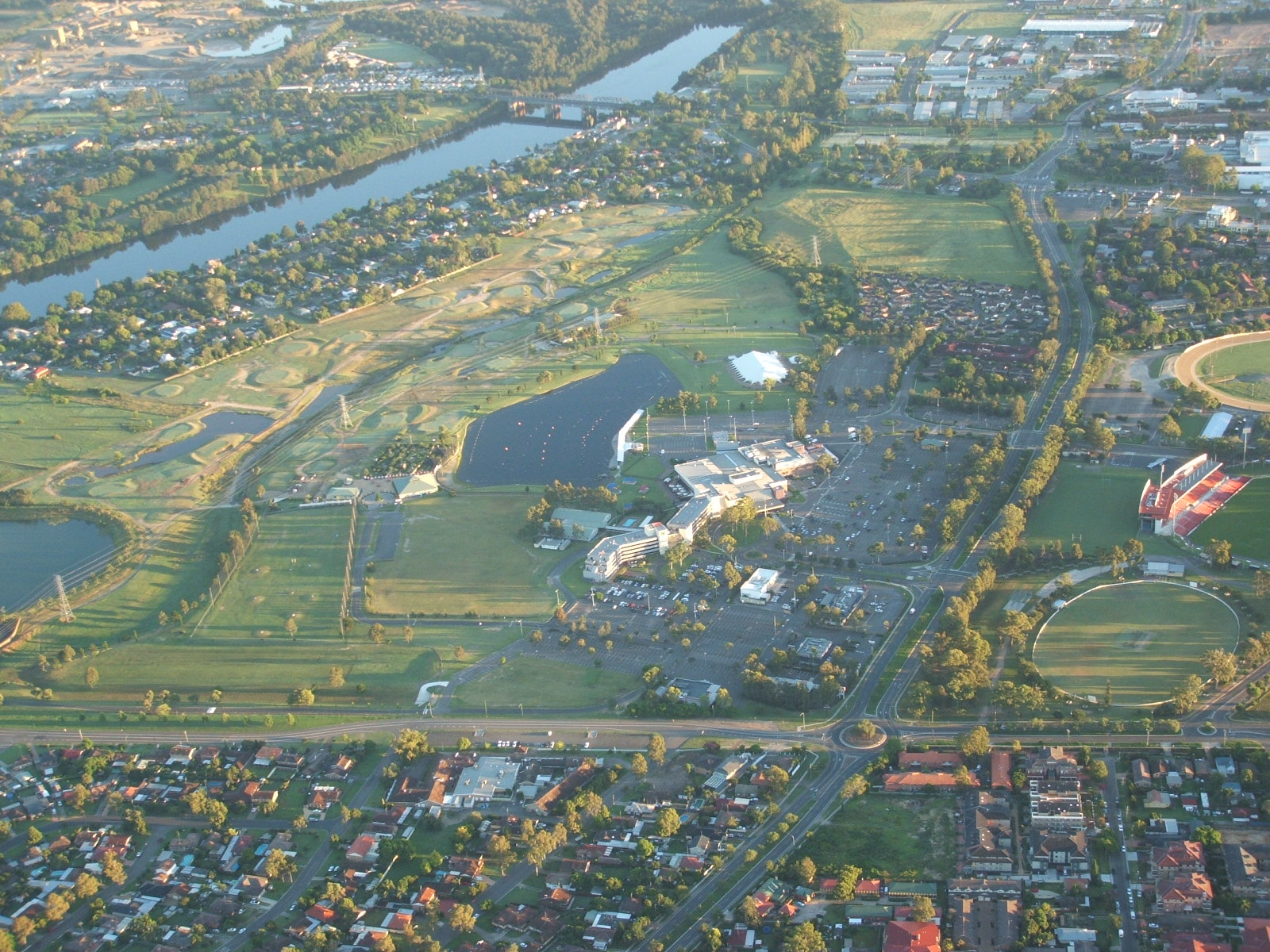
Aerial photograph of the Penrith Panthers Leagues Club complex

The Penrith Panthers Rugby League Football Club is the major financier of the Penrith Panthers Leagues Club (of the Panthers Entertainment Group).

The Panthers Entertainment Group has five licensed club sites – Penrith, Port Macquarie, Bathurst, North Richmond and Glenbrook. The clubs cater for a wide range of activities for members, their families and guests.

== Rivalries ==
=== Parramatta Eels ===
Parramatta entered the NSWRL now NRL competition in 1947, meanwhile Penrith entered 20 years later in 1967. Parramatta are the closest NRL team to Penrith geographically.

Former Penrith player Reagan Campbell-Gillard spoke about Penrith and Parramatta saying "As a Penrith junior, you come through the system to hate them. “I also don't like that word but it is. It doesn't matter what form you're in, it's a game you get up for".

In 2002, Parramatta thrashed Penrith 64–6 after a season in which Parramatta finished in first place on the ladder (and Penrith last). They would not meet again until Round 26, 2003, when the Panthers - in front of a then-record crowd - defeated Parramatta 40–22, denying the Eels a place in the finals (Parramatta had to win by 28+ points). Penrith went on to win the premiership that year. Round 17, 2009 saw a Penrith win by 38–34 in which the lead changed several times, before Parramatta recorded a huge 48–6 win in the penultimate round of the 2009 NRL season.

In the 2010 NRL season, Parramatta came from 22–0 down at half-time against Penrith to win 34–28 at Penrith Stadium with Parramatta player Jarryd Hayne starring with a man of the match performance.

Penrith then spoiled Nathan Hindmarsh's 300th NRL game in Round 19 of the 2011 NRL Season. The Eels were up by 6 with two seconds to play before Penrith's Michael Jennings made a break and kicked ahead for Lachlan Coote to score and force the game into golden point extra time. Halfback Luke Walsh then kicked a field goal in extra time to consign Hindmarsh to a 23-22 loss in his milestone match.

In round 5 of the 2020 NRL season, Parramatta came back from a 10–0 deficit at the 61st minute to beat Penrith 16–10, that would be Penrith's only loss in the 2020 NRL regular season that year as Penrith finished as minor premiers.

In 2021, Penrith won both regular season games against Parramatta, the first being a one-point victory at Penrith. Parramatta had a chance in the dying seconds to win the match, which was supposedly to cement Mitchell Moses against Adam Reynolds for a position as half-back in the New South Wales State of Origin squad to replace the injured Nathan Cleary. The other match was played in Queensland due to the Sydney Coronavirus outbreak, saw Penrith defeat Parramatta 40–6 where Parramatta rested most of their starting players.

In the 2022 regular season, Parramatta were the only club to beat Penrith twice and were also responsible for ending Penrith's unbeaten home winning streak which went back to the 2019 NRL season. In the 2022 Finals Series, Penrith and Parramatta faced off in the first week of finals. Penrith won 27–8 after a dazzling performance from Nathan Cleary. Parramatta managed to make their way to the 2022 NRL Grand Final facing off against Penrith for the fourth time that year. Penrith stunned Parramatta by going 18–0 up at half time with Nathan Cleary stating it was the best half they ever played. The onslaught continued as Penrith went 28–0 up at one stage, with Parramatta scoring two late consolation tries from Clinton Gutherson and Jakob Arthur. The final score ended 28–12 in favour of Penrith as they became the second team to win consecutive titles in the NRL era.

In round 4 of the 2023 NRL season, Parramatta met Penrith in the grand final rematch. Parramatta went into the game having started the season winless. Parramatta lead the match 16–8 with less than seven minutes to play but Penrith levelled the game at 16–16 after Nathan Cleary kicked a 40 metre field goal with seconds remaining. In golden point extra-time, Mitchell Moses kicked a field goal to win the game for Parramatta 17-16. In round 26 of the 2023 NRL season, Parramatta ended Penrith's eight game winning streak, defeating them 32-18 at home and potentially halting their chances of a minor premiership. In round 23 of the 2024 NRL season, Penrith staged one of the best comebacks in recent memory as they came from 16 points down to defeat Parramatta 36-34. Penrith scored three converted tries in six minutes to claim the victory.

Since Penrith entered the competition in 1967, the two clubs have only met in finals five times. The last being in the 2022 NRL Grand Final where Parramatta were beaten by Penrith 28–12 at Accor Stadium.

== Players ==
Penrith Panthers 2026 squad
Top 30 squad - 2026 NRL season			Coaching staff
Paul Alamoti – WG; Tom Ale – PR; Zakauri Clarke – SR; Nathan Cleary (c) – HB; Jack Cogger – HB, FE; Jack Cole – FE; Jaxen Edgar – FB; Dylan Edwards (vc) – FB; Sione Fonua – CE; Luke Garner – SR	Kalani Going – SR; Liam Henry – PR, SR; Tom Jenkins – WG; Mitch Kenny (vc) – HK; Moses Leota – PR; Freddy Lussick – HK; Liam Martin – SR; Casey McLean – CE; Jesse McLean – WG; Isaiah Papali'i – SR	Luron Patea – PR; Billy Phillips – LK; Billy Scott – HK; Lindsay Smith – PR; Scott Sorensen – SR; Izack Tago – CE; Blaize Talagi – FE; Brian To'o – WG; Isaah Yeo (c) – LK	Head coach: Ivan Cleary; Assistant coaches: Peter Wallace; Ben Harden; Jono Rolfe (Pathways Coach); Matt Eisenhuth (NSW Cup Coach); Scott Thompson (Jersey Flegg Cup Coach); Legend: (c) Captain(s); (vc) Vice-captain(s); Updated: 20 November 2026; Source(s): Panthers team profiles

== Notable players ==
=== Panthers Team of Legends ===
On 4 October 2006, a 40th anniversary Panthers Team of Legends was selected by a committee of experts and named at the Panthers' annual gala evening.

Penrith Panthers Team of Legends
Starting 13	Reserves	Coaching staff
399 Rhys Wesser – FB; 7 Bob Landers – WG; 14 Grahame Moran – CE; 337 Ryan Girdler – CE; 280 Alan McIndoe – WG; 286 Brad Fittler – FE; 228 Greg Alexander – HB; 50 Terry Geary – PR; 181 Royce Simmons – HK; 62 Tim Sheens – PR; 248 John Cartwright – SR; 100 Bill Ashurst – SR; 260 Colin van der Voort – LK	383 Craig Gower; 196 Brad Izzard; 262 Mark Geyer; 393 Tony Puletua	Legend: (c) Captain(s); (vc) Vice-captain(s); Updated: 4 October 2006; Source(s):

=== Hall of Fame ===
On 25 June 2016, the Panthers inducted the four inaugural members of its Hall of Fame - Grahame Moran, Royce Simmons, Greg Alexander, and Craig Gower.

== Head-to-head records ==
=== All Time ===
Opponent	Played	Won	Drawn	Lost	Win %
Dolphins	4	3	0	1	75.00
Titans	27	19	0	8	70.37
Tigers	45	30	0	15	66.67
Warriors	56	35	1	20	62.50
Raiders	85	45	1	39	52.94
Cowboys	51	26	1	24	50.98
Knights	61	31	4	26	50.82
Dragons	42	21	0	21	50.00
Rabbitohs	99	49	1	49	49.49
Sharks	103	48	3	52	46.60
Bulldogs	107	49	3	55	45.79
Eels	115	52	1	62	45.22
Sea Eagles	99	44	1	54	44.44
Roosters	106	47	1	58	44.34
Broncos	67	29	1	37	43.28
Storm	51	18	0	33	35.29
Total	1,152	556	19	577	48.26

=== NRL Era ===
Opponent	Played	Won	Drawn	Lost	Win%
Dolphins	4	3	0	1	75.00
Titans	26	19	0	7	73.08
Tigers	43	28	0	15	65.12
Warriors	50	32	1	17	64.00
Rabbitohs	46	28	0	18	60.87
Sea Eagles	43	26	0	17	60.47
Bulldogs	49	29	1	19	59.18
Roosters	50	29	0	21	58.00
Eels	55	30	0	25	54.55
Raiders	51	27	0	24	52.94
Knights	46	24	2	20	52.17
Cowboys	46	23	1	22	50.00
Sharks	47	23	1	23	48.94
Dragons	41	20	0	21	48.78
Broncos	48	22	1	25	45.83
Storm	49	16	0	33	32.65
Total	694	379	7	308	54.61

=== Discontinued teams ===
Win–Loss Rates Against All Discontinued Teams (2026)
Teams	Played	Wins	Draws	Losses	Win%
Gold Coast Chargers	12	9	1	2	75.0
Illawarra Steelers	25	14	1	10	56.0
Hunter Mariners	2	1	0	1	50.0
South Queensland Crushers	4	2	0	2	50.0
Western/Perth Reds	4	2	0	2	50.0
North Sydney Bears	61	28	2	31	45.9
Western Suburbs Magpies	67	28	3	36	41.8
Newtown Jets	39	16	3	20	41.0
Balmain Tigers	67	23	4	40	34.3
Northern Eagles	6	2	0	4	33.3
St George Dragons	60	19	1	40	31.7
Adelaide Rams	4	1	0	3	25.0

=== Finals appearances ===
21 (1985, 1988, 1989, 1990, 1991, 1997, 2000, 2003, 2004 2010, 2014, 2016, 2017, 2018, 2020, 2021, 2022, 2023, 2024, 2025, 2026)

== Coaches ==
There have been 20 coaches of the Panthers since their first season in 1967. The current coach is Ivan Cleary.

No	Name	Seasons	Games	Wins	Draws	Losses	Win %	Premiers	Runners-up	Minor premiers	Wooden spoons	Notes
1	Leo Trevena	1967, 1973	44	10	2	32	22.7	—	—	—	1973	—
2	Bob Boland	1968–1972	110	39	3	68	35.5	—	—	—	—	—
3	Jack Clare	1974	22	9	0	13	40.9	—	—	—	—	—
4	Mike Stephenson	1975	16	6	0	10	37.5	—	—	—	—	As captain-coach
5	Barry Harris	1975–76	28	9	2	17	32.1	—	—	—	—	—
6	Don Parish	1977–78	44	10	3	31	22.7	—	—	—	—	—
7	Len Stacker	1979–81	66	16	3	47	24.2	—	—	—	1980	—
8	John Peard	1982–83	52	16	1	35	30.8	—	—	—	—	—
9	Tim Sheens	1984–87	98	43	4	51	43.9	—	—	—	—	Club's first finals appearance in 1985
10	Ron Willey	1988-89	47	31	0	16	66.0	—	—	—	—	—
11	Phil Gould	1990–94	109	61	4	44	56.0	1991	1990	1991	—	Club's first premiership in 1991
12	Graham Rogers	1992	1	0	0	1	0.0	—	—	—	—	Caretaker coach
13	Royce Simmons	1994–2001	177	76	4	97	42.9	—	—	—	2001	—
14	John Lang	2002–06	125	65	0	60	52.0	2003	—	2003	—	—
15	Matthew Elliott	2007–11	111	49	2	60	44.1	—	—	—	2007	Sacked Mid Season 2011
16	Steve Georgallis	2011	11	4	0	7	36.4	—	—	—	—	Caretaker coach
17	Ivan Cleary	2012–15, 2019–present	291	197	2	102	64.3	2021 2022 2023 2024	2020	2020, 2022, 2023	—	Incumbent
18	Anthony Griffin	2016–2018	72	42	0	30	58.3	—	—	—	—	Contract terminated 6 August 2018
19	Cameron Ciraldo	2018, 2022	7	4	0	3	57.1	—	—	—	—	Caretaker coach
20	Andrew Webster	2022	1	0	0	1	0.0	—	—	—	—	Caretaker coach

== Records ==
=== Individual ===
==== Most games for club (200+) ====
- 285, Isaah Yeo (2014-present)
- 243, Steve Carter (1988–2001)
- 238, Royce Simmons (1980–1991)
- 238, Craig Gower (1996–2007)
- 230, Greg Alexander (1984–1994, 1997–1999)
- 221, Moses Leota (2016–present)
- 216, Luke Lewis (2001–2012)
- 215, Tony Puletua (1997–2008)
- 211, Nathan Cleary (2016—present)
- 211, Ryan Girdler (1993–2004)
- 209, Brad Izzard (1982–1992)

==== Most tries for club (Top 10) ====
- 113, Rhys Wesser (1998–2008)
- 104, Brian To'o (2019–present)
- 101, Ryan Girdler (1993–2004)
- 101, Greg Alexander (1984–1994, 1997–1999)
- 91, Luke Lewis (2001–2012)
- 76, Michael Jennings (2007–2012)
- 75, Josh Mansour (2012–2020)
- 73, Brad Izzard (1982–1992)
- 73, Nathan Cleary (2016-present)
- 69, Robbie Beckett (1994–2001)

==== Most points for club ====
- 1,941 (73 tries, 813 goals, 19 field goals), Nathan Cleary (2016–present)
- 1,572 (101 tries, 581 goals, 6 field goals), Ryan Girdler (1993–2004)
- 1,104 (101 tries, 343 goals, 14 field goals), Greg Alexander (1984–1994, 1997–1999)
- 798 (55 tries, 289 goals), Michael Gordon (2006–2012)
- 613 (43 tries, 220 goals, 1 field goal), Preston Campbell (2003–2006)
- 454 (113 tries, 1 goal), Rhys Wesser (1998–2008)

==== Most points in a season ====
- 270 by Michael Gordon in 2010
- 231 by Nathan Cleary in 2021
- 229 by Ryan Girdler in 1999

==== Most tries in a season ====
- 30 by Thomas Jenkins in 2026
- 25 by Rhys Wesser in 2003
- 23 by Amos Roberts in 2004
- 21 by Brian To'o in 2023
- 19 by Rhys Wesser in 2006

==== Most points in a match ====
- 34 (4 tries, 9 goals) by Nathan Cleary in Round 25 of the 2019 NRL season

== Supporters ==
Notable fans

- Nathan Bracken, Australian Cricketer
- Prue Car, 20th Deputy Premier of New South Wales
- James Courtney, Supercars driver
- Pat Cummins, Australian cricketer
- Anton Devcich, New Zealand Cricketer
- Mick Fanning, Australian professional surfer
- Kurt Fearnley, Paralympic wheelchair racer
- Jessica and Noemie Fox, Olympic canoeists
- John Hastings, Australian Cricketer
- Rieko Ioane, New Zealand rugby union player
- Matthew Nielsen, Olympic basketball player
- Leonardo Zappavigna, Australian professional boxer

== Season statistics ==
P=Premiers, R=Runner-Up, M=Minor Premiers, F=Finals appearance, W=Wooden Spoon: Premiers / Runners-up / Minor Premiers / Finals Appearance / Wooden Spoon
Season	Pos	Pld	W	D	L	B	F	A	+/-	Pts	P	R	M	F	W	Top Tryscorer	Top Pointscorer	Crowd*
1967	11th	22	5	2	15	0	203	352	−149	12						Bob Landers (6); David Applebee (6)	Bob Landers (88)	7,505
1968	8th	22	11	0	11	0	298	352	−54	22						Bob Mara (9)	Bob Landers (90)	10,628
1969	10th	22	6	1	15	0	311	398	−87	13						Mal McMartin (7)	Bob Landers (158)	4,974
1970	10th	22	7	1	14	0	292	406	−114	15						Reg Hatton (11)	Bob Landers (92)	7,180
1971	8th	22	10	0	12	0	283	372	-89	20						Grahame Moran (8)	Bruce Ward (85)	6,404
1972	11th	22	5	1	16	0	278	490	-212	11						Noel Sing (7)	Norm Gilligan (43)	4,959
1973	12th	22	5	0	17	0	272	525	-253	10					W	Ron Lynch (7)	Bruce Ward (39)	5,020
1974	9th	22	9	0	13	0	353	465	-112	18						Glenn West (14)	Reg Walton (136)	7,594
1975	11th	22	7	1	14	0	312	452	-140	15						Gary Allsopp (8)	Bill Ashurst (91)	9,087
1976	9th	22	8	1	13	0	352	333	+19	17						John King (10)	Ken Wilson (130)	9,429
1977	10th	22	6	1	15	0	319	408	-89	13						Kevin Dann (9)	Ken Wilson (97)	7,400
1978	10th	22	4	2	16	0	206	463	-257	10						Ross Gigg (7)	Phil Gould (77)	6,143
1979	10th	22	6	2	14	0	311	473	-162	14						Steve Martin (13)	Kevin Dann (61)	8,540
1980	12th	22	2	1	19	0	294	556	-262	5					W	Marvin Hicks (12)	Peter Schofield (81)	7,674
1981	11th	22	8	0	14	0	305	350	-45	16						Kevin Dann (9)	Kevin Dann (89)	8,876
1982	12th	26	7	1	18	0	375	441	-66	15						Brad Izzard (9)	Kevin Dann (66)	7,263
1983	11th	26	9	0	17	0	476	647	-171	18						Chris Houghton (10)	Mark Levy (74)	4,959
1984	7th	26	12	1	11	2	409	401	8	29						Brad Izzard (11)	Mark Levy (142)	8,564
1985	5th	24	13	1	10	2	460	379	+81	31				F		Greg Alexander (13)	Greg Alexander (192)	7,520
1986	8th	24	11	1	12	2	446	394	+52	27						Greg Alexander (11)	Greg Alexander (183)	7,520
1987	12th	24	6	1	17	2	274	399	-125	17						Mark Robinson (7)	Greg Alexander (57)	6,922
1988	5th	22	15	0	7	0	394	258	+136	30				F		David Greene (12)	Neil Baker (141)	9,079
1989	2nd	22	16	0	6	0	438	241	+197	32				F		Greg Alexander (15)	Neil Baker (131)	8,935
1990	3rd	22	15	1	6	0	415	286	+129	31		R		F		Alan McIndoe (14)	Greg Alexander (170)	10,025
1991	1st	22	17	1	4	0	483	250	+233	35	P		M	F		Graham Mackay (16)	Greg Alexander (139)	11,844
1992	9th	22	11	0	11	0	274	309	-35	22						Brad Fittler (6)	Andrew Leeds (94)	10,967
1993	12th	22	7	0	15	0	314	428	-114	18						Ryan Girdler (8)	Greg Alexander (88)	9,463
1994	8th	22	10	2	10	0	404	448	-44	22						Graham Mackay (15)	Graham Mackay (108)	11,021
1995	14th	22	9	0	13	0	481	484	-3	18						Robbie Beckett (10); Ryan Girdler (10)	Ryan Girdler (150)	8,022
1996	15th	21	7	1	6	0	363	464	-101	15						Robbie Beckett (9)	Ryan Girdler (162)	5,351
1997	5th	18	9	0	9	0	431	462	-31	18				F		Ryan Girdler (11)	Ryan Girdler (197)	7,673
1998	14th	24	8	2	14	0	525	580	-55	18						Robbie Beckett (12)	Ryan Girdler (134)	9,272
1999	10th	24	11	1	12	2	492	428	+64	27						Ryan Girdler (18)	Ryan Girdler (229)	12,495
2000	5th	26	15	0	11	0	573	562	+11	30				F		Ryan Girdler (13)	Ryan Girdler (210)	14,305
2001	14th	26	7	0	19	0	521	847	-326	14					W	Chris Hicks (13)	Ryan Girdler (124)	14,353
2002	12th	24	7	0	17	2	546	654	-108	18						Rhys Wesser (19)	Ryan Girdler (100)	11,008
2003	1st	24	18	0	6	2	659	527	+132	40	P		M	F		Rhys Wesser (25)	Preston Campbell (164)	17,771
2004	4th	24	15	0	9	2	672	567	+105	34				F		Amos Roberts (23)	Amos Roberts (156)	17,587
2005	10th	24	11	0	13	2	554	554	0	26						Rhys Wesser (14)	Preston Campbell (190)	15,576
2006	12th	24	10	0	14	2	510	587	-77	24						Rhys Wesser (19)	Preston Campbell (163)	11,579
2007	16th	24	8	0	16	1	539	607	-68	18					W	Michael Jennings (15)	Michael Gordon (150)	12,035
2008	12th	24	10	1	13	2	504	611	-107	25						Michael Jennings (12)	Michael Gordon (120)	10,899
2009	11th	24	11	1	12	2	515	589	-74	27						Michael Jennings (17)	Michael Gordon (126)	13,719
2010	2nd	24	15	0	9	2	645	489	+156	34				F		Lachlan Coote (17)	Michael Gordon (270)	13,056
2011	12th	24	9	0	15	2	430	517	-87	22						Lachlan Coote (12); David Simmons (12)	Michael Gordon (66)	12,299
2012	15th	24	8	0	16	2	409	575	-166	20						Michael Jennings (10)	Luke Walsh (97)	10,858
2013	10th	24	11	0	13	2	495	532	-37	26						David Simmons (19)	Luke Walsh (159)	10,337
2014	4th	24	15	0	9	2	506	426	+80	34				F		Josh Mansour (15)	Jamie Soward (155)	11,462
2015	11th	24	9	0	15	2	399	477	-78	22						David Simmons (9)	Matt Moylan (50)	11,544
2016	6th	24	14	0	10	2	563	463	+100	32				F		Josh Mansour (16)	Nathan Cleary (118)	13,567
2017	7th	24	13	0	11	2	504	459	+45	30				F		Nathan Cleary (11)	Nathan Cleary (228)	12,922
2018	5th	24	15	0	9	1	517	461	+56	32				F		Waqa Blake (13)	James Maloney (126)	14,204
2019	10th	24	11	0	13	1	413	474	-61	24						Nathan Cleary (10)	Nathan Cleary (157)	12,437
2020	1st	20	18	1	1	0	537	238	+299	37		R	M	F		Stephen Crichton (15)	Nathan Cleary (171)	10,160
2021	2nd	24	21	0	3	1	676	286	+390	44	P			F		Matt Burton (16)	Nathan Cleary (213)	15,968
2022	1st	24	20	0	4	1	636	330	+306	42	P		M	F		Taylan May (16)	Nathan Cleary (130)	16,001
2023	1st	24	18	0	6	3	645	312	+333	42	P		M	F		Brian To'o (21)	Nathan Cleary (204)	18,865
2024	2nd	24	17	0	7	3	580	394	+186	40	P			F		Sunia Turuva (17)	Nathan Cleary (126)	19,663
2025	7th	24	13	1	10	3	576	469	+107	33				F		Paul Alamoti (17)	Nathan Cleary (184)	14,564
2026	1st	24	18	0	6	0	683	345	+336	42			M	F		Tom Jenkins (30)	Nathan Cleary (213)	TBA
