= List of Penrith Panthers players =

The Penrith Panthers are an Australian professional rugby league team based in the western Sydney suburb of Penrith, New South Wales. The club was founded in 1966, and joined the New South Wales Rugby League in 1967. As of 2026, the Panthers have won six Premierships, in 1991, 2003, 2021, 2022, 2023, and 2024.

The following is a list of rugby league footballers who have appeared for Penrith Panthers since the club's first league game in 1967. As foundation captain of the club Tony Brown was afforded the No.1 position on the list.

== Players ==
Correct as of round 6 of the 2026 NRL season

Club								Representative	
No.	Name	Career	Appearances	Tries	Goals	FGs	Points	Country	State
1	Tony Brown	1967	3	0	0	0	0	—	—
2	David Applebee	1967–1972	89	23	0	0	69	—	—
3	Wal Crust	1967–1969	37	1	0	0	3	—	—
4	Laurie Fagan	1967–1970	79	10	2	4	42	—	—
5	Ern Gillon	1967–1970	63	4	0	0	12	—	—
6	Barry Harris	1967	15	0	0	0	0	—	—
7	Bob Landers	1967–1970	68	18	187	0	428	—	—
8	Bill McCall	1967	22	2	0	0	6	—	—
9	Wayne Peckham	1967–1969	44	11	1	0	35	—	—
10	Maurie Raper	1967–1970	51	10	0	8	46	—	—
11	Bill Tonkin	1967–1968	18	2	1	0	8	—	—
12	Geoff Waldie	1967	16	1	0	0	3	—	—
13	Ron Workman	1967–1972	93	5	0	1	17	—	—
14	Grahame Moran	1967–1974	122	25	4	0	83	—	NSW
15	Russell Johnstone	1967–1970	33	6	0	0	18	—	—
16	Doug Ricketson	1967	3	0	0	0	0	—	—
17	Tom Wilson	1967	21	0	0	0	0	—	—
18	Peter Matson	1967	1	0	0	0	0	—	—
19	Pat Hughes	1967	1	0	0	0	0	—	—
20	John Watkins	1967–1968	4	0	0	0	0	—	—
21	Colin Piper	1967	5	0	0	0	0	—	—
22	George Piper	1967–1968	25	2	0	0	6	—	—
23	Maurie Burgmann	1967	2	0	0	0	0	—	—
24	John Stapley	1967	3	0	0	0	0	—	—
25	Alan Miller	1967	4	0	0	0	0	—	—
26	Neil Bailey	1967–1969, 1971	14	2	7	1	22	—	—
27	Paul Hatton	1967	1	0	0	0	0	—	—
28	Warren Crotty	1967	3	0	0	0	0	—	—
29	Bob Broad	1968–1971	45	5	0	0	15	—	—
30	Don Hobson	1968	3	1	0	0	3	—	—
31	Peter Linde	1968–1969	2	0	0	0	0	—	—
32	Bob Mara	1968–1969	22	12	0	1	38	—	—
33	Jim Hall	1968	7	1	0	0	3	—	—
34	Bob Boland	1968–1970	44	3	0	7	23	—	—
35	Mike Leary	1968–1972	92	13	0	2	43	—	—
36	Rod Elliott	1968–1971	60	5	0	0	15	—	—
37	Ian McKechnie	1968–1975	68	9	46	0	119	—	—
38	Boris Stcherbina	1968	4	1	0	0	3	—	—
39	Mal McMartin	1968–1971	63	15	0	0	45	—	—
40	Barry Boss	1968	3	1	0	0	3	—	—
41	Graham Lisle	1968	3	0	0	0	0	—	—
42	Mike Wylie	1968	1	0	0	0	0	—	—
43	Paul Gibson	1969–1970	16	3	2	0	13	—	—
44	Gary Harvey	1969–1974	61	4	31	0	74	—	—
45	Phil Kliendienst	1969–1972	63	10	0	0	30	—	—
46	Ron Clothier	1969–1971	26	5	0	0	15	—	—
47	John Moran	1969–1973	50	15	0	0	45	—	—
48	Ray Steele	1969–1970	23	0	8	12	40	—	—
49	Alan Powell	1969	4	0	0	0	0	—	—
50	Terry Geary	1969–1976	95	5	0	0	15	—	—
51	Keith Broad	1969	1	1	0	0	3	—	—
52	Bruce Delaney	1970	13	0	0	0	0	—	—
53	Reg Hatton	1970–1971	35	16	0	0	48	—	—
54	Phil Franks	1970	8	0	0	0	0	—	—
55	Bruce Ward	1970–1974, 1976–1977, 1979	65	10	77	1	186	—	—
56	Alan Wingate	1970–1972	18	0	0	0	0	—	—
57	Peter Guthrie	1970	1	0	0	0	0	—	—
58	Peter Wright	1970–1971	16	0	0	0	0	—	—
59	Kevin Rafferty	1970	1	0	0	0	0	—	—
60	Bob Goodsell	1970	2	0	0	0	0	—	—
61	Ian Hancock	1971	2	0	0	0	0	—	—
62	Tim Sheens	1971–1982	166	11	0	0	33	—	—
63	Noel Sing	1971–1973	55	9	0	0	27	—	—
64	Larry Pinkerton	1971	8	1	0	0	3	—	—
65	David Goldman	1971	1	0	0	0	0	—	—
66	Ralph Michaels	1971	6	1	0	0	3	—	—
67	Dennis Coffey	1971–1973	12	1	0	0	3	—	—
68	Zac Olejarnik	1971–1978	82	18	0	0	54	—	—
69	Gary Nelson	1971	1	1	0	0	3	—	—
70	Roy West	1971–1975	16	2	0	0	6	—	—
71	Len Killeen	1972	8	2	15	0	36	—	—
72	Ron Lynch	1972–1973	44	10	0	0	30	—	—
73	Dennis Tutty	1972–1974	46	8	0	0	24	—	—
74	Tony Buckpitt	1972–1973	6	0	0	0	0	—	—
75	Reg Walton	1972–1977	42	6	102	0	222	—	—
76	Mike Jones	1972	4	0	0	0	0	—	—
77	Norm Gilligan	1972–1974	23	6	28	0	74	—	—
78	Ron Carrige	1972	6	1	0	0	3	—	—
79	Dave Irvine	1972–1973	20	8	0	0	24	—	—
80	Jersey Komorowski	1972–1975	8	2	0	0	6	—	—
81	Ron Mason	1972–1973	21	1	0	0	3	—	—
82	Stephen Snell	1972–1973	6	0	0	0	0	—	—
83	Wayne Melville	1972	8	1	0	0	3	—	—
84	John Wilson	1972	1	0	0	0	0	—	—
85	Ross Gannon	1972	6	0	0	0	0	—	—
86	Doug Bayly	1972–1974	29	6	0	0	18	—	—
87	Phillip Capper	1973–1975	18	7	1	0	23	—	—
88	Phillip Ryan	1973–1975	6	0	0	0	0	—	—
89	Peter Swanson	1973–1974	21	6	0	0	18	—	—
90	Geoff Bracken	1973	4	2	0	0	6	—	—
91	Stephen Gauley	1973	1	0	0	0	0	—	—
92	Wayne Moore	1973–1975	31	5	0	0	15	—	—
93	Glenn West	1973–1977	66	31	0	0	93	—	—
94	Ritchie Thornton	1973–1975	8	0	0	0	0	—	—
95	Peter Langmack	1973–1976	56	12	0	0	36	—	—
96	Peter Archibald	1973–1974	19	8	0	0	24	—	—
97	John Maxwell	1973–1974	4	0	0	0	0	—	—
98	Keith Howie	1973–1974	2	0	0	0	0	—	—
99	Joe O'Hehir	1973	3	0	0	0	0	—	—
100	Bill Ashurst	1974–1976	46	19	51	6	165	—	—
101	Glenn Stolzenhein	1974	17	0	0	0	0	—	—
102	Dominic Drady	1974	2	0	0	0	0	—	—
103	Mervyn Hayward	1974, 1977–1980	19	0	0	0	0	—	—
104	Wayne Brain	1974–1975	12	0	0	0	0	—	—
105	Phil Jelley	1974	11	0	0	0	0	—	—
106	Brian Lawrence	1974	3	0	0	0	0	—	—
107	Mike Stephenson	1974–1978	69	21	0	0	63	—	—
108	David Hodge	1974–1975	15	3	0	0	9	—	—
109	John Klein	1974–1976	30	9	0	0	27	—	—
110	Terry Quinn	1974–1978	62	13	0	0	39	—	—
111	Ross Gigg	1974–1979, 1982–1984	110	31	6	0	113	—	—
112	Gary Allsopp	1975–1978	49	9	3	0	33	—	—
113	Barry Le Brocq	1975–1979	24	2	0	0	6	—	—
114	Ross Gibson	1975	12	0	0	0	0	—	—
115	Peter Newsome	1975–1977	27	7	1	0	23	—	—
116	Brian Reeve	1975–1976	23	8	0	0	24	—	—
117	Terry Wickey	1975–1980	90	17	0	0	51	—	—
118	Greg Coleman	1975–1977	3	0	0	0	0	—	—
119	John King	1976–1979	57	13	0	0	39	—	—
120	Bob O'Reilly	1976–1977	30	2	0	0	6	—	—
121	Ken Wilson	1976–1978	47	7	117	5	260	—	—
122	Gary Nicholls	1976	1	0	0	0	0	—	—
123	David Topliss	1976	12	0	0	0	0	—	—
124	Graham Ernst	1976	1	0	0	0	0	—	—
125	Vaughan Humphries	1976	9	1	0	0	3	—	—
126	Frank Marino	1976–1977	10	0	0	0	0	—	—
127	Ray Blacklock	1976–1980	32	13	0	0	39	—	—
128	Michael Kelly	1976–1981, 1984	43	10	0	0	30	—	—
129	Phil Gould	1976–1979	29	2	49	1	105	—	—
130	Harry Peters	1976	1	0	0	0	0	—	—
131	Brad Waugh	1976–1985	85	3	0	0	10	—	—
132	John Dykes	1977	3	0	0	0	0	—	—
133	Paul Merlo	1977–1979	57	12	0	0	36	—	—
134	Jim Reynolds	1977	4	1	0	0	3	—	—
135	John Ryan	1977–1980	55	14	1	0	44	—	—
136	Ross Cale	1977–1980	39	1	0	0	3	—	—
137	Richard Cooke	1977	3	0	0	0	0	—	—
138	Kevin Dann	1977–1984	121	40	98	1	318	—	NSW
139	Jim Hindmarsh	1977–1978	13	0	24	0	48	—	—
140	George Longhurst	1977–1978	25	4	0	0	12	—	—
141	Pat Broderick	1977–1979	16	0	0	0	0	—	—
142	Brian Henderson	1977–1978	29	3	0	0	9	—	—
143	Tas Baitieri	1978–1981	16	0	0	0	0	—	—
144	Cliff Cartwright	1978–1979	1	0	0	0	0	—	—
145	Kent Lambert	1978	1	0	0	0	0	—	—
146	Greg Moore	1978	17	1	0	0	3	—	—
147	Ken Bousfield	1978	12	0	0	0	0	—	—
148	Russell Mullins	1978–1979	18	0	0	0	0	—	—
149	John Farragher	1978	7	0	0	0	0	—	—
150	Gary Pethybridge	1978–1980	32	5	0	0	15	—	—
151	Tim Armistead	1978–1979	10	0	0	0	0	—	—
152	Warren Fenton	1978–1987	145	19	0	0	62	—	—
153	Phil Sinclair	1978	1	0	0	0	0	—	—
154	Mark O'Dare	1978	1	0	0	0	0	—	—
155	Henry Foster	1979–1983, 1986	68	14	0	0	51	—	—
156	Darryl Brohman	1979–1983, 1986–1987	95	12	7	0	54	—	QLD
157	Nick Geiger	1979	5	0	0	0	0	—	—
158	Peter Kelly	1979	9	1	0	0	3	—	—
159	Wayne Seaton	1979–1980	10	1	23	0	49	—	—
160	Jon Burnitt	1979	4	1	0	0	3	—	—
161	David Cartwright	1979–1981	14	2	0	0	6	—	—
162	Steve Martin	1979–1984	48	20	0	0	62	—	—
163	Lew Zivanovic	1979–1986	119	5	0	0	15	—	—
164	Phil Doyle	1979	4	0	5	0	10	—	—
165	Wayne Sheens	1979–1980	13	1	0	0	3	—	—
166	Doug Reilly	1979	3	0	0	0	0	—	—
167	Craig McMahon	1979–1982	31	6	0	0	18	—	—
168	Ken Wolffe	1979–1986	103	30	0	0	107	—	—
169	Darryl Griffen	1979–1984	13	3	0	0	12	—	—
170	Trevor Quinn	1979	2	0	0	0	0	—	—
171	Graeme Jennings	1979–1983	57	16	49	2	154	—	—
172	Mick Reed	1979	1	0	0	0	0	—	—
173	Keith Marshall	1979	2	0	5	0	10	—	—
174	Wayne Ducker	1980–1981	16	1	0	0	3	—	—
175	Jamie Jones	1980–1983	49	0	0	0	0	—	—
176	Kevin Pobjie	1980–1983	40	11	0	0	34	—	—
177	Peter Schofield	1980	12	1	39	0	81	—	—
178	Marvin Hicks	1980–1982	27	14	0	0	42	—	—
179	Mark Ross	1980	13	2	0	1	7	—	—
180	David Hall	1980–1982	32	2	0	0	6	—	—
181	Royce Simmons	1980–1991	237	15	1	3	61	AUS	NSW
182	Bruce Trudgett	1980	5	1	0	0	3	—	—
183	Ken Jury	1980	1	0	0	0	0	—	—
184	Mark Levy	1981–1985	103	17	137	0	334	—	—
185	Richard Quinn	1981	4	0	0	0	0	—	—
186	Ken Hey	1981	11	1	0	0	3	—	—
187	Lew Platz	1981–1983	59	8	0	0	26	—	—
188	Mark Garrard	1981	2	1	0	0	3	—	—
189	Terry Gilles	1981	7	0	4	0	8	—	—
190	Glen Holton	1981	2	0	0	0	0	—	—
191	Ray Spurr	1981	5	1	0	0	3	—	—
192	Allan Woods	1981–1982	6	1	0	0	3	—	—
193	Rod Wright	1981–1983	45	15	0	0	47	—	—
194	Paul Hunt	1982	1	0	0	0	0	—	—
195	Eddie Flahey	1982–1983	19	4	0	0	12	—	—
196	Brad Izzard	1982–1992	209	73	0	0	283	—	NSW
197	Craig McAlpine	1982–1983	20	4	28	1	71	—	—
198	Don Price	1982–1984	13	0	0	0	0	—	—
199	Des Hasler	1982–1983	12	5	0	0	19	—	—
200	Attila Tuza	1982	2	0	0	0	0	—	—
201	Brian Walden	1982–1983	8	3	0	0	9	—	—
202	Shane Marshall	1982–1983	14	3	23	0	55	—	—
203	Peter Partington	1982–1984	3	0	0	0	0	—	—
204	Rod Whiticker	1982–1983	7	0	0	0	0	—	—
205	Anslem Delaney	1982–1984	8	0	0	0	0	—	—
206	Bob Jackson	1982–1983	10	1	1	0	6	—	—
207	Brett Lobb	1982–1987	74	15	10	0	77	—	—
208	Mike Smith	1982–1983	20	2	0	0	8	—	—
209	Neville Glover	1982–1983	13	4	0	0	16	—	—
210	Les White	1982–1984	10	1	0	0	4	—	—
211	Brett Ford	1982–1984	6	0	0	0	0	—	—
212	Matt Goodwin	1983–1989	119	10	0	0	40	—	—
213	Geoff Hay	1983	9	2	0	0	8	—	—
214	Chris Houghton	1983, 1985–1987	57	12	0	0	48	—	—
215	Paul Younane	1983	14	8	0	0	32	—	—
216	Greg Clements	1983–1989	75	16	5	1	75	—	—
217	Craig Connor	1983–1990	86	10	0	0	40	—	—
218	Warren Gentles	1983–1985	16	2	0	0	8	—	—
219	Rod Pethybridge	1983	1	0	0	0	0	—	—
220	Craig Izzard	1983–1987	53	1	0	0	4	—	—
221	Steve Robinson	1983–1985	40	7	0	0	28	—	—
222	David Serg	1983	1	0	0	0	0	—	—
223	Michael Davis	1984	8	1	0	0	4	—	—
224	Val De Bono	1984	5	0	0	0	0	—	—
225	Tony Gavan	1984	1	0	0	0	0	—	—
226	Doug Russell	1984	1	0	0	0	0	—	—
227	Joe Vitanza	1984–1987, 1990–1991	65	3	0	0	12	—	—
228	Greg Alexander	1984–1994, 1997–1999	228	101	343	14	1104	AUS	NSW
229	Peter Burgmann	1984–1985	21	1	0	0	4	—	—
230	Stephen Davies	1984	5	0	0	0	0	—	—
231	Ben Gonzales	1984–1987	73	22	0	0	88	—	—
232	Gary Howell	1984–1987	41	16	0	0	64	—	—
233	David Lenkeith	1984	1	0	0	0	0	—	—
234	Steve Halliwell	1984	3	0	0	0	0	—	—
235	Bob Muirhead	1984	5	0	0	0	0	—	—
236	Shane Jones	1984	1	0	0	0	0	—	—
237	Geoff Green	1984	2	0	0	0	0	—	—
238	Wayne Elvin	1984	2	0	0	0	0	—	—
239	Tony Butterfield	1984–1987	9	0	0	0	0	—	—
240	Brandon Lee	1984–1987, 1991	34	0	0	1	1	—	—
241	Rob Robards	1984–1988	43	4	0	0	16	—	—
242	Shane Doran	1984	1	0	0	0	0	—	—
243	David Burnes	1985–1986	16	2	0	0	8	—	—
244	Geoff Gerard	1985–1989	101	3	0	0	12	—	—
245	Tony Trudgett	1985	20	5	0	0	20	—	—
246	Chris Blair	1985	3	0	0	0	0	—	—
247	Garry Wicks	1985	2	0	0	0	0	—	—
248	John Cartwright	1985–1996	188	14	0	0	56	AUS	NSW
249	Steve Antonelli	1985	5	1	0	0	4	—	—
250	Michael Lans	1985	1	0	0	0	0	—	—
251	Mark Robinson	1985–1987	25	9	0	0	36	—	—
252	Col Bentley	1986–1992, 1995	114	9	0	0	36	—	—
253	David Greene	1986–1992	79	27	0	0	108	—	—
254	Mark Bevan	1986–1987	15	1	27	0	58	—	—
255	Garry Longhurst	1986–1987	11	1	0	0	4	—	—
256	Paul Akkary	1986–1988	29	1	0	0	4	—	—
257	Greg Gibson	1986–1987	4	0	1	0	2	—	—
258	David Liddiard	1986–1987	32	11	0	0	44	—	—
259	Glenn Miller	1986–1987	4	0	0	0	0	—	—
260	Colin van der Voort	1986–1994	119	7	0	0	28	—	—
261	Darren Currie	1986–1988	11	2	0	0	8	—	—
262	Mark Geyer	1986–1992, 1998–2000	135	9	0	0	36	AUS	NSW
263	Glen Nissen	1986–1987, 1992	23	3	0	0	12	—	—
264	Mark Carroll	1987–1989	13	0	0	0	0	—	—
265	Ken Gittins	1987–1988	8	2	0	0	8	—	—
266	Doug Delaney	1987–1988, 1993	19	1	0	0	4	—	—
267	Jamie Thompson	1987–1988	4	0	0	0	0	—	—
268	Andrew Fitzhenry	1987	4	0	6	0	12	—	—
269	Paul Smith	1987–1993	78	27	0	0	108	—	—
270	Rod McNeill	1987–1991	23	5	10	0	40	—	—
271	Michael Moss	1987	3	1	0	0	4	—	—
272	Jacques Moliner	1987	1	0	0	0	0	FRA	—
273	Neil Baker	1988–1989	41	7	115	14	272	—	—
274	Graeme Bradley	1988–1991	73	16	0	0	64	—	—
275	Peter Kelly	1988–1990	40	1	0	0	4	—	NSW
276	Chris Mortimer	1988–1990	59	6	12	0	48	—	NSW
277	Steve Carter	1988–2001	243	65	3	2	268	—	NSW
278	Steve Waddell	1988–1991, 1995–1997	50	0	0	0	0	—	—
279	Barry Walker	1988–1996	117	9	0	0	36	—	—
280	Alan McIndoe	1989–1990	37	26	0	0	104	—	QLD
281	Andrew Simons	1989–1990	27	14	0	0	56	—	—
282	Shayne Stead	1989	11	1	28	0	60	—	—
283	Tracy Lazenby	1989	4	0	0	0	0	—	—
284	Graham Settree	1989	2	0	0	0	0	—	—
285	Darren Willis	1989–1991	20	5	0	0	20	—	—
286	Brad Fittler	1989–1995	119	31	5	2	136	AUS	NSW
287	Greg Barwick	1990–1991	24	10	22	0	84	—	—
288	Brook Kennedy	1990–1991	13	0	0	0	0	—	—
289	Peter Tunks	1990	12	0	0	0	0	—	—
290	Paul Clarke	1990–1993	86	2	0	0	8	—	—
291	Darren Stewart	1990–1991, 1993	13	0	0	0	0	—	—
292	Ben Alexander	1990–1992	36	7	3	1	35	—	—
293	Scott Ellem	1990–1991	13	0	0	0	0	—	—
294	Grant Izzard	1990–1992	12	1	0	0	4	—	—
295	Paul Taylor	1990	3	1	0	1	5	—	—
296	Sean Felstead	1990	1	0	0	0	0	—	—
297	Darrien Doherty	1990	1	0	0	0	0	—	—
298	Alex Geddes	1990	1	0	0	0	0	—	—
299	Richard Korn	1990	1	0	0	0	0	—	—
300	Chris Williams	1990–1992	2	0	0	0	0	—	—
301	Graham Mackay	1991–1994	82	43	41	1	255	AUS	NSW
302	Shayne Boyd	1991–1992	8	0	0	0	0	—	—
303	Carl MacNamara	1991–2001	181	4	0	0	16	—	—
304	Paul Dunn	1991–1992	34	0	0	0	0	—	NSW
305	Anthony Xuereb	1991, 1993–1994	32	7	1	0	30	—	—
306	Darren Tuite	1991–1992	7	0	0	0	0	—	—
307	Mark Lyons	1991–1992	7	1	0	0	4	—	—
308	Luke Goodwin	1992	11	2	2	0	12	—	—
309	Graham Lyons	1992	4	0	0	0	0	—	—
310	Andrew Leeds	1992	19	3	41	0	94	—	—
311	Jamie Olejnik	1992	11	0	0	0	0	—	—
312	Justin Hair	1992	3	1	0	0	4	—	—
313	Glen Liddiard	1992	4	1	0	0	4	—	—
314	Scott Murray	1992	1	0	0	0	0	—	—
315	Peter Trevitt	1992–1993	5	0	0	0	0	—	—
316	Danny Farrar	1992–1997	79	9	0	0	36	—	—
317	Brett Boyd	1992–1998	92	10	1	0	42	—	—
318	David Frankham	1992	2	0	0	0	0	—	—
319	Gary Kennedy	1992–1994	15	1	0	0	4	—	—
320	Tulsen Tollett	1992	9	0	0	0	0	—	—
321	Gavin Docherty	1992	1	0	0	0	0	—	—
322	Glen Yealland	1992	2	0	0	0	0	—	—
323	Nathan Barnes	1992–1993	12	2	0	0	8	—	—
324	Matt Adamson	1993–2001	157	28	2	0	116	AUS	NSW
325	Phil Adamson	1993–1998	99	22	0	0	88	—	NSW
326	Matt Donovan	1993	4	0	0	0	0	—	—
327	Mark McGaw	1993	16	3	0	0	12	—	—
328	Paul Quinn	1993	6	0	0	0	0	—	—
329	Peter Shiels	1993	5	0	0	0	0	—	—
330	Corey Stewart	1993	5	0	0	0	0	—	—
331	Ian McCann	1993	6	0	0	0	0	—	—
332	Shane O'Grady	1993	3	0	0	0	0	—	—
333	Rob Farrier	1993	1	0	0	0	0	—	—
334	Sandy Epere	1993	1	0	0	0	0	—	—
335	Ashley Gordon	1993	7	0	0	0	0	—	—
336	Michael Gillett	1993	3	0	0	0	0	—	—
337	Ryan Girdler	1993–2004	204	101	581	6	1572	AUS	NSW
338	Stan Presdee	1993	3	1	0	0	4	—	—
339	Shane Vincent	1993	7	2	0	0	8	—	—
340	Jason Ryan	1993	3	0	0	0	0	—	—
341	Grant Trindall	1993	1	0	0	0	0	—	—
342	Troy Cassell	1993–1994	13	1	0	0	4	—	—
343	Brett Gillard	1993–1994	16	1	0	0	4	—	—
344	Jason Nicol	1993	3	0	0	0	0	—	—
345	Matt Sing	1993–1995	36	14	0	0	56	AUS	QLD
346	Brad Drew	1993–2000	62	9	0	1	37	—	—
347	Phil Howlett	1993	1	0	0	0	0	—	—
348	Col Murphy	1993	1	0	0	0	0	—	—
349	Todd Gahagan	1993	1	0	0	0	0	—	—
350	Matt Hamilton	1993–1995	5	0	0	0	0	—	—
351	Gareth Payne	1993	1	0	0	0	0	—	—
352	Mark Bell	1994	7	1	0	0	4	—	—
353	Gary Freeman	1994–1995	44	21	0	0	84	NZL	—
354	Trevor Gillmeister	1994	22	1	0	0	4	—	QLD
355	Jason Lidden	1994–1995	25	2	0	0	8	—	—
356	Craig O'Dwyer	1994	2	0	0	0	0	—	—
357	Stephen Bosse	1994	3	0	0	0	0	—	—
358	Keiren Meyer	1994	2	0	0	0	0	—	—
359	Robbie Beckett	1994–2001	147	66	0	0	264	—	—
360	Michael Cartwright	1994	1	0	0	0	0	—	—
361	Darren Brown	1994–1998	65	11	0	0	44	—	—
362	Joe Dakuitoga	1994–1995	7	1	0	0	4	FIJ	—
363	Jody Gall	1994–1998, 2000–2002	106	10	0	0	40	—	—
364	Livai Nalagilagi	1994	11	2	0	0	8	FIJ	—
365	Ben Sologinkin	1994	6	0	0	0	0	—	—
366	Kurt Landers	1994–1995	4	0	0	0	0	—	—
367	Scott Pethybridge	1994–1996	34	10	7	0	54	—	—
368	David Alexander	1995–1997	35	1	0	0	4	—	—
369	Morvin Edwards	1995–1998	38	4	0	0	16	—	—
370	Marty Moore	1995	12	4	0	0	16	—	—
371	Bobby Thompson	1995–1998	62	5	0	0	20	—	—
372	Fa'ausu Afoa	1995–1997	22	1	0	0	4	SAM	—
373	Scott McPherson	1995	3	0	0	0	0	—	—
374	Ken McIntosh	1995	2	0	0	0	0	—	—
375	Kris Flint	1995	3	0	0	0	0	—	—
376	David Barrett	1995	1	0	0	0	0	—	—
377	Simon Hauville	1995	2	0	0	0	0	—	—
378	Gavin Clinch	1996	10	0	0	0	0	—	—
379	Jason Williams	1996–1998	41	14	0	0	56	—	—
380	Garen Casey	1996–1997	24	7	4	0	36	—	—
381	Gordon Falcon	1996–1998	22	1	0	0	4	—	—
382	Andrew Hinson	1996–2001	49	17	0	0	68	—	—
383	Craig Gower	1996–2007	238	55	4	5	233	AUS	NSW
384	Mark Booth	1996	3	0	0	0	0	—	—
385	Ned Catic	1996–2002	46	5	0	0	20	—	—
386	Fred Petersen	1996–2001	14	1	0	0	4	SAM	—
387	Duncan MacGillivray	1996–2001	49	2	0	0	8	—	—
388	Sid Domic	1997–2001	88	16	0	0	64	—	—
389	Paul Johnson	1997–1998	10	0	0	0	0	—	—
390	Peter Jorgensen	1997–2001	69	32	0	0	128	—	—
391	Chris Hicks	1997–2002	101	36	77	0	298	—	—
392	Lee Hopkins	1997–2002	70	5	0	0	20	—	—
393	Tony Puletua	1997–2008	211	40	0	0	160	NZL→SAM	—
394	John Cross	1997–2002	109	19	0	0	76	—	—
395	Craig Wise	1997–1998	13	1	0	0	4	—	—
396	David Woods	1998–2001	63	17	0	0	68	—	—
397	Brian Leauma	1998	1	0	0	0	0	—	—
398	Frank Puletua	1998–2001, 2004–2010	151	4	0	0	16	SAM	—
399	Rhys Wesser	1998–2008	177	113	1	0	454	—	QLD
400	Chris Levy	1998–2001	8	1	0	0	4	—	—
401	David Elvy	1998–1999	17	0	0	0	0	—	—
402	Shane Elford	1998–2003, 2009–2010	89	31	0	0	124	—	—
403	Nigel Gaffey	1999–2000	24	1	0	0	4	—	—
404	Troy Perkins	1999	6	0	0	0	0	—	—
405	Scott Sattler	1999–2003	118	16	1	0	66	—	QLD
406	Craig Greenhill	1999–2001	61	0	0	0	0	—	QLD
407	Matthew Rieck	1999–2001	31	8	0	0	32	—	—
408	Marty O'Connell	1999–2001	3	0	0	0	0	—	—
409	Brett Atkinson	1999–2002	14	3	0	0	12	—	—
410	Matthew Rodwell	2000–2001	44	9	0	2	38	—	—
411	Justin Holbrook	2001	8	1	0	0	4	—	—
412	David McLean	2001–2005	10	1	0	0	4	—	—
413	Luke Rooney	2001–2008	140	65	0	0	260	AUS	NSW
414	Ben Reynolds	2001–2002	15	5	13	0	46	—	—
415	Robbie Duffy	2001	2	0	0	0	0	—	—
416	Luke Lewis	2001–2012	208	89	0	0	356	AUS	NSW
417	Martin Lang	2002–2004	67	0	0	0	0	—	QLD
418	Luke Priddis	2002–2008	162	34	0	0	136	AUS	—
419	Ben Roarty	2002–2003	32	4	0	0	16	—	—
420	Colin Ward	2002–2003	31	2	0	0	8	—	—
421	Shannon Donato	2002–2005	25	0	0	0	0	—	—
422	Joe Galuvao	2002–2005	78	15	0	0	60	NZL	—
423	Geoff Bell	2002–2003	13	5	0	0	20	—	—
424	Joel Clinton	2002–2007	137	5	0	0	20	AUS	—
425	Chad Halliday	2002	11	0	0	0	0	—	—
426	Luke Young	2002	5	1	4	0	12	—	—
427	Paul Whatuira	2002–2004	62	21	0	0	84	NZL	—
428	Danny Galea	2002–2006, 2012	80	15	0	0	60	—	—
429	Shane Rodney	2002–2006, 2008	79	11	9	0	62	—	—
430	Steve Turner	2002–2003	2	0	0	0	0	—	—
431	Trent Waterhouse	2002–2011	186	39	1	0	158	AUS	NSW
432	Preston Campbell	2003–2006	96	43	220	1	613	—	—
433	Ben Ross	2003–2005	55	4	0	0	16	—	QLD
434	Brett Howland	2003–2005	30	8	0	0	32	—	—
435	Luke Swain	2003–2006	78	6	0	0	24	—	—
436	Frank Pritchard	2003–2010	144	37	0	0	148	NZL	—
437	Peter Lewis	2003	2	0	0	0	0	—	—
438	Amos Roberts	2004	23	23	32	0	156	—	—
439	Jason Wrigley	2004	2	0	0	0	0	—	—
440	Trent Clayton	2004–2005	6	4	0	0	16	—	—
441	Danny Russell	2004	3	0	0	0	0	—	—
442	Richard Faʻaoso	2004	10	2	0	0	8	—	—
443	Ben Rogers	2004–2005	11	2	0	0	8	—	—
444	Luke Dyer	2004	1	0	0	0	0	—	—
445	Ben Pomeroy	2004–2005	10	2	0	0	8	—	—
446	Garret Crossman	2004–2005	24	0	0	0	0	—	—
447	Paul Franze	2005	21	11	0	0	44	—	—
448	Peter Wallace	2005–2007, 2014–2018	101	14	16	4	92	SCO	
449	Matthew Cross	2005–2007	33	6	0	0	24	—	—
450	Lee Hookey	2006	17	8	0	0	32	—	—
451	Bryan Norrie	2006–2007	28	0	0	0	0	—	—
452	Mark O'Halloran	2006–2008	11	0	0	0	0	USA	—
453	Craig Stapleton	2006	24	1	0	0	4	—	—
454	Nick Youngquest	2006–2007	18	9	15	0	66	—	—
455	Paul Aiton	2006–2009	72	8	0	0	32	PNG	—
456	Michael Gordon	2006–2012	108	55	289	0	798	—	NSW
457	Matthew Bell	2006–2011	110	1	0	0	4	—	—
458	Keith Peters	2006–2008	10	1	0	0	4	PNG	—
459	Craig Trindall	2006	3	0	0	1	1	—	—
460	Junior Moors	2007–2008	24	1	0	0	4	—	—
461	Nathan Smith	2007–2013	121	13	0	0	52	—	—
462	Brendan Worth	2007–2008	15	1	0	0	4	—	—
463	Michael Jennings	2007–2012	122	71	0	0	284	AUS	NSW
464	Tim Grant	2007–2014, 2019	129	5	0	0	20	—	NSW
465	Geoff Daniela	2007–2009, 2012–2013	30	15	0	0	60	COK	—
466	Maurice Blair	2007–2009	48	10	0	0	40	—	—
467	Brett Firman	2007	2	0	0	0	0	—	—
468	Liam Georgetown	2007	1	0	0	0	0	—	—
469	John Nu'uma'ali'i	2007	1	0	0	0	0	—	—
470	Richie Williams	2007	4	1	0	0	4	—	—
471	Jarrod Sammut	2007–2009	38	7	44	2	118	MLT	—
472	Petero Civoniceva	2008–2011	74	3	0	0	12	AUS	QLD
473	Brad Tighe	2008–2013	113	41	0	0	164	—	—
474	Joe Williams	2008	1	0	2	0	4	—	—
475	Adam Woolnough	2008–2009	17	1	0	0	4	—	—
476	Joseph Paulo	2008–2011	30	4	0	0	16	SAM	—
477	Sam McKendry	2008–2018	147	8	0	0	32	NZL	—
478	Josh Bateman	2008	2	0	0	0	0	—	—
479	Wade Graham	2008–2010	42	9	0	0	36	—	—
480	Masada Iosefa	2008–2011	43	8	0	0	32	SAM	—
481	Lachlan Coote	2008–2013	83	43	10	1	193	—	—
482	Daniel Penese	2008	2	0	0	0	0	—	—
483	Willie Isa	2008	1	0	0	0	0	—	—
484	Gavin Cooper	2009–2010	40	4	1	0	18	—	—
485	Luke Walsh	2009–2013	107	10	154	10	358	—	—
486	Joel Romelo	2009	3	0	0	0	0	—	—
487	Andrew Emelio	2009	1	0	0	0	0	—	—
488	Junior Tia-Kilifi	2009	8	4	0	0	16	SAM	—
489	Ben McFadgean	2009	1	0	0	0	0	—	—
490	Travis Burns	2010–2012	55	13	25	1	103	—	—
491	Kevin Kingston	2010–2014	105	18	0	0	72	—	—
492	Nigel Plum	2010–2015	92	3	0	0	12	—	—
493	Adrian Purtell	2010–2011	46	15	0	0	60	—	—
494	Sandor Earl	2010–2012	16	6	0	0	24	—	—
495	David Simmons	2010–2015	88	49	2	0	200	—	—
496	Daine Laurie	2010	3	0	0	0	0	—	—
497	Sarafu Fatiaki	2011	8	0	0	0	0	FIJ	—
498	Timana Tahu	2011	7	3	0	0	12	—	—
499	Nafe Seluini	2011–2012	19	1	0	0	4	TON	—
500	Yileen Gordon	2011	3	0	0	0	0	—	—
501	Dayne Weston	2011–2012	33	0	0	0	0	—	—
502	Taioalo Vaivai	2011	8	0	0	0	0	—	—
503	Harry Siejka	2011–2012	4	0	1	0	2	—	—
504	Ryan Walker	2011	3	1	0	0	4	—	—
505	Blake Austin	2011–2013	16	2	8	0	24	—	—
506	Chris Armit	2012	11	0	0	0	0	—	—
507	Cameron Ciraldo	2012–2013	32	1	0	0	4	ITA	—
508	Clint Newton	2012–2013	46	6	1	0	26	USA	—
509	Etu Uaisele	2012	14	5	0	0	20	(Tonga)	—
510	Ryan Simpkins	2012–2013	27	3	0	0	12	—	—
511	Mitch Achurch	2012	11	0	0	0	0	—	—
512	Matthew Robinson	2012–2014	32	4	0	0	16	—	—
513	Josh Mansour	2012–2020	158	74	0	0	296	AUS	NSW
514	Arana Taumata	2012	2	1	0	0	4	—	—
515	Shane Shackleton	2012	4	0	0	0	0	—	—
516	Travis Robinson	2012–2013	9	6	0	0	24	LEB	—
517	Adam Docker	2012–2015	42	2	0	0	8	—	—
518	Tom Eisenhuth	2012	1	0	0	0	0	—	—
519	Dean Whare	2013–2020	130	31	0	0	124	NZL	—
520	Wes Naiqama	2013	8	2	1	0	10	FIJ	—
521	Sika Manu	2013–2015	61	6	0	0	24	(Tonga)	—
522	Lewis Brown	2013–2015	66	10	0	0	40	NZL	—
523	James Segeyaro	2013–2016	70	26	0	0	104	—	—
524	Jeremy Latimore	2013–2016	75	3	0	0	12	—	—
525	Tom Humble	2013	6	1	0	0	4	—	—
526	Matt Moylan	2013–2017	89	26	29	8	170	AUS	NSW
527	Mose Masoe	2013	17	2	0	0	8	SAM	—
528	Isaac John	2013–2015	26	5	0	0	20	COK→NZL	—
529	Sam Anderson	2013–2015	7	0	0	0	0	—	—
530	James Roberts	2013	6	6	0	0	24	—	—
531	John Wilson (Note: Phil Gould posted to X (formerly Twitter) in 2024 providing clarification about the addition of John Wilson and Bruce Martin to Penrith's player list in c. 2013–14. When the player records were compiled, Wilson was erroneously believed to be the same person as another John Wilson who had played at the club in 1972 (player 84). The John Wilson of 1974 was allocated 531. Martin was identified as having been a replacement player in one match in 1980, previously attributed to Steve Martin (player 162), and was allocated 532.)	1974	22	6	0	0	18	—	—
532	Bruce Martin	1980	1	0	0	0	0	—	—
533	Jamie Soward	2014–2016	53	8	117	1	267	—	—
534	Brent Kite	2014–2015	25	0	0	0	0	—	—
535	Elijah Taylor	2014–2016	39	3	0	0	12	NZL	—
536	Tyrone Peachey	2014–2018, 2023–2024	126	50	0	0	200	—	NSW
537	Isaah Yeo	2014–	272	33	0	0	132	AUS	NSW
538	Jamal Idris	2014–2015	28	8	0	0	32	—	—
539	Kevin Naiqama	2014	8	7	0	0	28	FIJ	—
540	Dallin Watene-Zelezniak	2014–2019	106	41	0	0	164	NZL	—
541	Bryce Cartwright	2014–2017	68	16	0	0	64	—	—
542	Will Smith	2014–2016	21	2	4	0	16	—	—
543	Ben Murdoch-Masila	2014	6	0	0	0	0	(Tonga)	—
544	Kierran Moseley	2014	1	0	0	0	0	—	—
545	Reagan Campbell-Gillard	2015–2019	114	9	0	0	36	AUS	NSW
546	George Jennings	2015	5	2	0	0	8	(Tonga)	—
547	Apisai Koroisau	2015, 2020–2022	79	12	4	0	56	FIJ	NSW
548	Waqa Blake	2015–2019	88	34	0	0	136	FIJ	—
549	Robert Jennings	2015, 2022	13	2	0	0	8	—	—
550	Leilani Latu	2015–2017	49	6	0	0	24	TON	—
551	Tupou Sopoaga	2015	5	0	0	0	0	COK	—
552	Sione Katoa	2015–2019	48	0	0	0	0	TON	—
553	Chris Smith	2015, 2022–	7	1	0	0	4	—	—
554	Peta Hiku	2016–2017	20	6	0	0	24	NZL	—
555	Trent Merrin	2016–2018	72	8	0	0	32	AUS	NSW
556	Suaia Matagi	2016	23	0	0	0	0	—	—
557	James Fisher-Harris	2016–2024	203	16	0	0	64	NZL	—
558	Sitaleki Akauola	2016–2017	21	0	0	0	0	TON	—
559	Te Maire Martin	2016–2017	13	4	0	1	17	NZL	—
560	Nathan Cleary	2016–	200	69	749	17	1795	AUS	NSW
561	Chris Grevsmuhl	2016	14	2	0	0	8	—	—
562	Moses Leota	2016–	207	15	0	0	60	SAM→NZL	—
563	Zak Hardaker	2016	11	1	0	0	4	—	—
564	Dylan Edwards	2016–	177	63	42	1	338	AUS	NSW
565	Tim Browne	2017–2018	19	0	0	0	0	—	—
566	James Tamou	2017–2020	96	9	0	0	36	AUS	NSW
567	Viliame Kikau	2017–2022	123	38	0	0	152	FIJ	—
568	Corey Harawira-Naera	2017−2018	46	13	0	0	52	—	—
569	Michael Oldfield	2017	1	1	0	0	4	—	—
570	Malakai Watene-Zelezniak	2017, 2019–2020	6	1	0	0	4	—	—
571	Mitch Rein	2017	5	2	0	0	8	—	—
572	Tyrone May	2017–2021	56	10	0	0	40	SAM	—
573	James Maloney	2018–2019	44	6	65	8	162	AUS	NSW
574	Christian Crichton	2018, 2022	21	4	0	0	16	SAM	—
575	Wayde Egan	2018–2019	29	2	0	0	8	—	—
576	Kaide Ellis	2018–2020	8	0	0	0	0	—	—
577	Jack Hetherington	2018–2020	17	0	0	0	0	—	—
578	Tyrone Phillips	2018	9	4	0	0	16	FIJ	—
579	Jarome Luai	2018–2024	131	25	8	0	116	SAM	NSW
580	Caleb Aekins	2018–2020	12	0	0	0	0	—	—
581	Tyrell Fuimaono	2019	7	0	0	0	0	—	—
582	Hame Sele	2019	5	0	0	0	0	—	—
583	Frank Winterstein	2019	12	1	0	0	4	—	—
584	Liam Martin	2019–	151	31	0	0	124	AUS	NSW
585	Brian To'o	2019–	139	91	0	0	364	SAM	NSW
586	Mitch Kenny	2019–	134	4	0	0	16	—	—
587	Brent Naden	2019–2021	37	24	0	0	96	—	—
588	Jed Cartwright	2019	1	0	0	0	0	—	—
589	Stephen Crichton	2019–2023	100	56	74	0	372	SAM	NSW
590	Matt Burton	2019–2021	32	20	6	1	93	—	—
591	Spencer Leniu	2019–2023	83	8	0	0	32	SAM	—
592	Billy Burns	2019–2020	12	0	0	0	0	—	—
593	Zane Tetevano	2020	18	0	0	0	0	NZL	—
594	Kurt Capewell	2020–2021	32	10	0	0	40	—	QLD
595	Charlie Staines	2020–2022	39	23	0	0	92	SAM	—
596	Daine Laurie	2020, 2024–2025	26	4	0	0	16	—	—
597	Paul Momirovski	2021	19	6	0	0	24	—	—
598	Matt Eisenhuth	2021–2025	75	1	0	0	4	—	—
599	Scott Sorensen	2021–	105	13	0	0	52	NZL	—
600	J'maine Hopgood	2021–2022	9	0	0	0	0	—	—
601	Jaeman Salmon	2021–2023	44	6	0	0	24	—	—
602	Lindsay Smith	2021–	86	9	0	0	36	AUS	—
603	Izack Tago	2021–	99	41	0	0	164	SAM	—
604	Taylan May	2021–2024	30	17	0	0	68	SAM	—
605	Tevita Pangai Junior	2021	6	2	0	0	8	—	—
606	Sean O'Sullivan	2022	11	2	2	0	12	—	—
607	Soni Luke	2022–2025	26	1	0	0	4	TON	—
608	Kurt Falls	2022	3	0	7	0	14	—	—
609	Sunia Turuva	2022–2024	52	30	0	0	120	FIJ	—
610	Thomas Jenkins	2022–2023, 2025–	33	32	0	0	128	—	—
611	Liam Henry	2022–	50	5	0	0	20	—	—
612	Jack Cole	2022–	17	3	0	0	12	—	—
613	Eddie Blacker	2022	1	0	0	0	0	—	—
614	Luke Garner	2023–	58	14	0	0	56	—	—
615	Zac Hosking	2023	21	3	0	0	12	—	—
616	Jack Cogger	2023, 2026-	16	0	5	1	11	—	—
617	Luke Sommerton	2023–2025	12	2	0	0	8	—	—
618	Jesse McLean	2023–	4	1	0	0	4	—	—
619	Brad Schneider	2024–2025	32	6	1	0	26	—	—
620	Mavrik Geyer	2024–2025	14	0	0	0	0	—	—
621	Paul Alamoti	2024–	41	26	34	0	172	TON	—
622	Trent Toelau	2024–2025	14	1	0	0	4	—	—
623	Preston Riki	2024–2025	3	0	0	0	0	—	—
624	Casey McLean	2024–	35	22	0	0	88	NZL	—
625	Luron Patea	2024–	16	1	0	0	4	—	—
626	Isaiah Iongi	2024	1	0	0	0	0	—	—
627	Isaiah Papali'i	2025–	29	8	0	0	32	NZL	—
628	Blaize Talagi	2025–	28	7	0	0	28	SAM	—
629	Harrison Hassett	2025	1	1	0	0	4	—	—
630	Sione Fonua	2025–	1	0	0	0	0	—	—
631	David Fale	2025	1	0	0	0	0	—	—
632	Austin Dias	2025	1	0	0	0	0	—	—
633	Zac Lipowicz	2025	1	0	0	0	0	POL	—
634	Riley Price	2025	1	0	0	0	0	—	—
635	Billy Phillips	2025–	7	0	0	0	0	—	—
636	Jaxen Edgar	2025–	1	0	0	0	0	—	—
637	Kalani Going	2026-	2	0	0	0	0	—	—
638	Freddy Lussick	2026-	3	1	0	0	4	—	—

== Sources ==
- "Panthers all time player list". Penrith Panthers Rugby League Football Club. Archived from the original on 21 March 2013.
- "Penrith Panthers - Players". Rugby League Project. Shawn Dollin, Andrew Ferguson and Bill Bates.
- "Mighty Panthers: From chocolate soldiers to black magic". Andrew Ison.
- "Panthers Foundation Players". NRL 10 March 2016.
