= 2026 Penrith Panthers season =

- NRL Rank: 1st (as at round 17)
- 2026 record: Wins: 12; losses: 3
- Points scored: For: 467; against: 209

Team information
- CEO: Brian Fletcher
- Coach: (Australia) Ivan Cleary
- Captain: (Australia) Nathan Cleary (Australia) Isaah Yeo
- Stadium: CommBank Stadium
- High attendance: 46,752 (Round 11 vs Dragons)
- Low attendance: 12,000 (Round 2 vs Sharks)

Top scorers
- Tries: Thomas Jenkins (22)
- Points: Nathan Cleary (149)
← 2025	List of seasons	2027 →

The 2026 Penrith Panthers season is the 60th season in the club's history. The team is coached by Ivan Cleary and co-captained by Nathan Cleary and Isaah Yeo.

Penrith play at CommBank Stadium in Parramatta for their home fixtures this season, due to renovations at their usual home ground, Penrith Stadium. The club is expected to begin playing at their new home ground, named Helloworld Stadium due to sponsorship reasons, in 2027.

== Season summary ==
=== Early season (Rounds 1-7) ===
Penrith opened its 2026 NRL campaign with five consecutive victories. In Round 6, the club suffered its first defeat against the Canterbury-Bankstown Bulldogs. During the round 7 match against the Dolphins in Darwin, hooker Mitch Kenny sustained a fractured fibula and a syndesmosis injury, requiring transport to a local hospital.

Concurrently, winger Tom Jenkins set a premiership record by scoring at least two tries in each of the first seven games of the season. This streak included a four-try performance against the Sydney Roosters in Round 3, bringing the total to 16 tries by the conclusion of Round 7.

=== Mid-season (Rounds 8-13) ===
Beginning with their golden-point victory over the Dolphins, the Panthers embarked on a seven-game winning streak. Following Round 11, four Penrith players—Nathan Cleary, Isaah Yeo, Casey McLean, and Brian To'o—were selected to represent New South Wales in Game One of the 2026 State of Origin series.

In Round 14, the Panthers recorded the biggest win in club history, defeating the Wests Tigers 68–0.

=== Slump in form (Rounds 14-17) ===
After their Round 15 bye, the Panthers endured two consecutive losses to the Gold Coast Titans and North Queensland Cowboys.

== 2026 squad ==
Penrith Panthers 2026 squad
Top 30 squad - 2026 NRL season			Coaching staff
Paul Alamoti – WG; Tom Ale – PR; Zakauri Clarke – SR; Nathan Cleary (c) – HB; Jack Cogger – HB, FE; Jack Cole – FE; Jaxen Edgar – FB; Dylan Edwards (vc) – FB; Sione Fonua – CE; Luke Garner – SR	Kalani Going – SR; Liam Henry – PR, SR; Tom Jenkins – WG; Mitch Kenny (vc) – HK; Moses Leota – PR; Freddy Lussick – HK; Liam Martin – SR; Casey McLean – CE; Jesse McLean – WG; Isaiah Papali'i – SR	Luron Patea – PR; Billy Phillips – LK; Billy Scott – HK; Lindsay Smith – PR; Scott Sorensen – SR; Izack Tago – CE; Blaize Talagi – FE; Brian To'o – WG; Isaah Yeo (c) – LK	Head coach: Ivan Cleary; Assistant coaches: Peter Wallace; Ben Harden; Jono Rolfe (Pathways Coach); Matt Eisenhuth (NSW Cup Coach); Scott Thompson (Jersey Flegg Cup Coach); Legend: (c) Captain(s); (vc) Vice-captain(s); Updated: 19 July 2026; Source(s): Panthers team profiles

== Regular season ==
=== Ladder ===
Pos	Team	Pld	W	D	L	B	PF	PA	PD	Pts	Qualification
1	Penrith Panthers (Q)	17	13	0	4	3	515	237	+278	32	Advance to finals series
2	New Zealand Warriors	17	12	0	5	3	490	288	+202	30	Advance to finals series
3	Sydney Roosters	17	12	0	5	3	426	342	+84	30	Advance to finals series
4	Cronulla-Sutherland Sharks	17	11	0	6	3	488	363	+125	28	Advance to finals series
5	Dolphins	18	11	0	7	2	488	404	+84	26	Advance to finals series
6	Newcastle Knights	18	11	0	7	2	459	422	+37	26	Advance to finals series
7	South Sydney Rabbitohs	17	9	0	8	3	482	406	+76	24	Advance to finals series
8	North Queensland Cowboys	18	10	0	8	2	424	460	−36	24	Advance to finals series
9	Manly Warringah Sea Eagles	18	9	0	9	2	473	347	+126	22	
10	Canterbury-Bankstown Bulldogs	17	8	0	9	3	324	394	−70	22	
11	Melbourne Storm	18	8	0	10	2	420	430	−10	20	
12	Canberra Raiders	18	8	0	10	2	379	460	−81	20	
13	Brisbane Broncos	17	6	0	11	3	329	453	−124	18	
14	Wests Tigers	18	7	0	11	2	355	517	−162	18	
15	Parramatta Eels	17	6	0	11	3	331	507	−176	18	
16	Gold Coast Titans	17	5	0	12	3	335	441	−106	16	
17	St. George Illawarra Dragons (X)	17	2	0	15	3	256	503	−247	10	

Updated to match(es) played on 19 July 2026. Source: National Rugby League
(Q) Qualified for finals series; (X) Cannot qualify for finals

=== Matches ===
Win Draw Loss Fixtures

Date	Round	Opponent	Venue	Result	Score	Tries	Goals	Attendance
Friday, 6 March	1	Brisbane Broncos	Suncorp Stadium	Won	0-26	Casey McLean, Dylan Edwards, Thomas Jenkins (2)	Cleary (5/6)	45,566
Saturday, 14 March	2	Cronulla Sharks	Carrington Park	Won	26-6	Brian To'o, Thomas Jenkins (2), Nathan Cleary	Cleary (5/5)	12,000
Friday, 20 March	3	Sydney Roosters	Allianz Stadium	Won	4-40	Thomas Jenkins (4), Brian To'o, Dylan Edwards (2)	Cleary (6/8)	22,128
Saturday, 28 March	4	Parramatta Eels	CommBank Stadium	Won	48-20	Isaah Yeo, Isaiah Papali'i, Blaize Talagi, Lindsay Smith, Casey McLean, Paul Alamoti, Thomas Jenkins (2)	Cleary (8/8)	22,813
Friday, 3 April	5	Melbourne Storm	CommBank Stadium	Won	50-10	Liam Martin, Freddy Lussick, Thomas Jenkins (2), Nathan Cleary, Casey McLean, Brian To'o, Luke Garner, Dylan Edwards	Cleary (6/8), Alamoti (1/1)	20,204
Thursday, 9 April	6	Canterbury-Bankstown Bulldogs	Accor Stadium	Lost	32-16	Thomas Jenkins (2), Dylan Edwards	Cleary (2/3)	23,984
Friday, 17 April	7	Dolphins	TIO Stadium	Won	22-23 (g.p.)	Dylan Edwards, Blaize Talagi, Thomas Jenkins (2)	Cleary (3/4), FG: Cleary (1/2)	12,570
Sunday, 26 April	8	Newcastle Knights	McDonald Jones Stadium	Won	44-12	Dylan Edwards (3), Nathan Cleary, Freddy Lussick, Brian To'o (2), Izack Tago	Cleary (6/8)	23,986
Sunday, 3 May	9	Manly Warringah Sea Eagles	CommBank Stadium	Won	18-16	Blaize Talagi, Brian To'o, Izack Tago	Cleary (3/3), FG: Cleary (0/1)	14,960
Sunday, 10 May	10	Canberra Raiders	GIO Stadium	Won	18-30	Blaize Talagi (2), Casey McLean, Nathan Cleary, Billy Phillips	Cleary (5/5)	18,018
Sunday, 17 May	11	St. George Illawarra Dragons	Suncorp Stadium	Won	28-6	Thomas Jenkins (2), Isaiah Papali'i, Brian To'o, Luke Garner	Cleary (4/5)	46,752
	12	Bye						
Sunday, 31 May	13	New Zealand Warriors	CommBank Stadium	Won	20-18	Casey McLean (2), Paul Alamoti (2)	Alamoti (2/4)	17,640
Sunday, 7 June	14	Wests Tigers	CommBank Stadium	Won	0-68	Paul Alamoti, Nathan Cleary, Freddy Lussick (2), Thomas Jenkins (2), Isaah Yeo, Brian To'o (2), Jack Cogger, Izack Tago, Lindsay Smith	Cleary (9/11), Alamoti (1/1)	21,803
	15	Bye						
Saturday, 20 June	16	Gold Coast Titans	Cbus Super Stadium	Lost	19-18	Liam Martin, Luke Garner, Lindsay Smith	Alamoti (3/3)	20,049
Saturday, 27 June	17	North Queensland Cowboys	Queensland Country Bank Stadium	Lost	26-12	Thomas Jenkins (2)	Cleary (2/3)	22,888
Friday, 3 July	18	South Sydney Rabbitohs	CommBank Stadium	Won	36-14	Dylan Edwards, Liam Henry, Thomas Jenkins (3), Billy Phillips	Alamoti (6/6)	15,163
	19	Bye						
Thursday, 16 July	20	Brisbane Broncos	CommBank Stadium					
Thursday, 23 July	21	Parramatta Eels	CommBank Stadium					
Saturday, 1 August	22	Canberra Raiders	Glen Willow Oval					
Friday, 7 August	23	New Zealand Warriors	Go Media Stadium					
Thursday, 13 August	24	Sydney Roosters	CommBank Stadium					
Thursday, 20 August	25	Melbourne Storm	AAMI Park					
Friday, 28 August	26	Canterbury-Bankstown Bulldogs	CommBank Stadium					
Sunday, 6 September	27	Wests Tigers	CommBank Stadium					
