= Paul Johnson =

Paul Johnson may refer to:

== Musicians ==
- Paul Johnson (producer) (1971–2021), American producer and DJ
- Paul Johnson (singer), British soul singer of the 1980s
- Paul Johnson (guitarist), American
- Paul Francis Johnson, Australian bassist, frontman of Mr Floppy and Poontang

== Government and politics ==
- Paul Johnson (American politician) (born 1959), former mayor of Phoenix, Arizona
- Paul Johnson (Canadian politician) (born 1952), former Ontario Member of Provincial Parliament
- Paul Johnson (civil servant), city manager of Toronto since 2022
- Paul B. Johnson Jr. (1916–1985), American politician, governor of Mississippi 1964–1968
- Paul B. Johnson Sr. (1880–1943), American politician, governor of Mississippi 1940–1943
- Paul Johnson (United States Air Force) (born 1958), USAF general and Distinguished Service Cross recipient
- Paul Wesley Johnson (1941–2021), American writer, policymaker, and environmentalist

== Scholars and clergy ==
- K. Paul Johnson (born 1953), library director and writer
- Paul Johnson (economist) (born 1967), British civil servant and economist
- Paul Johnson (writer) (1928–2023), British journalist and historian
- Paul E. Johnson (born 1942), American historian, and professor emeritus at University of South Carolina
- Paul S. L. Johnson (1873–1950), American scholar and pastor, the founder of the Laymen's Home Missionary Movement
- Paul V. Johnson (born 1954), American leader in The Church of Jesus Christ of Latter-day Saints

== Sportspeople ==
- Paul Johnson (American football coach, born 1957), American football coach
- Paul Johnson (American football coach, born 1984), American football coach
- Paul Johnson (Australian footballer, born 1962), Australian rules footballer
- Paul Johnson (Australian footballer, born 1984), Australian rules footballer in the 2000s
- Paul Johnson (baseball) (1896–1973), American Major League outfielder
- Paul Johnson (cricketer) (born 1965), English cricketer
- Paul Johnson (footballer, born 1955) (1955–2025), English footballer
- Paul Johnson (footballer, born 1959), English footballer
- Paul Johnson (footballer, born 1992), English footballer
- Paul Johnson (Gaelic footballer) (born 1986), Irish dual player
- Paul Johnson (ice hockey) (1935–2016), American ice hockey player
- Paul Johnson (rugby league, born 1970), New Zealand rugby league player
- Paul Johnson (rugby league, born 1973), Australian rugby league player
- Paul Johnson (rugby league, born 1978), English rugby league player
- Paul Johnson (rugby league, born 1988), English rugby league player
- Paul Johnson (rugby union) (1924–1995), Australian rugby union player
- Paul Johnson (squash player) (born 1972), English squash player
- Paul Johnson (wheelchair athlete) (1966–2020), Canadian wheelchair tennis player

== Other ==
- Paul Johnson, alias Paul America (1944–1982), American colleague of Andy Warhol
- Paul Johnson (book artist) (born 1943), British book artist and paper engineer
- Paul Johnson (comics) (born 1958), British comics artist
- Paul Johnson (philanthropist) (1929–2015), Canadian philanthropist
- Paul Marshall Johnson Jr. (1955–2004), American murdered hostage

== See also ==
- Paul Johnston (disambiguation)
- Paul Johnstone (disambiguation)
