= Daniel Russell =

Daniel, Dan, or Danny Russell may refer to:

- Daniel Russell (Massachusetts politician) (1824–1907), American politician
- Daniel Lindsay Russell (1845–1908), governor of North Carolina
- Dan Russell (cartoonist) (1906–1999), Australian cartoonist
- Dan Monroe Russell Jr. (1913–2011), United States federal judge
- Daniel J. Russell (born 1932), American judge in New Jersey
- Daniel R. Russel (born 1953), U.S. diplomat and Assistant Secretary of State
- Dan Russell, American voice actor in Legend of the Dragon and The Amazing World of Gumball
- Danny Russell (rugby league, born 1969), (born 1969), rugby league footballer of the 1990s and 2000s
- Danny Russell (rugby league, born 1983) (born 1983), rugby league footballer of the 2000s for Penrith Panthers
- Daniel Russell (rugby league) (born 1995), Australian rugby league footballer of the 2010s
- Dan Russell (artist manager), American artist manager, musician and record producer
- Daniel M. Russell, American computer scientist
- Dan Russell, Canadian radio presenter on the station AM 650
- Daniel Patrick Russell, Australian actor
