= Pethybridge =

Pethybridge is a surname. Notable people with the surname include:

- Gary Pethybridge (born 1950), Australian rugby league footballer
- George Herbert Pethybridge (1871–1948), British mycologist and plant pathologist
- Scott Pethybridge (born 1977), Australian rugby league footballer
