= Leslie White (disambiguation) =

Leslie White (1900–1975) was an American anthropologist.

Leslie White may also refer to:

- Les White (rugby league, born 1905), Welsh rugby league footballer who played in the 1920s, 1930s and 1940s
- Les White (rugby league, born 1920), English rugby league footballer who played in the 1940s and 1950s
- Leslie White (rugby league, fl. 1982–88), Australian rugby league footballer who played in the 1980s
- Les White (1890–1927), Australian rules footballer

== See also ==
- Leslie Wight (1929–2004), cricketer
