= Parramatta Marist High School =

Location
- 2 Darcy Road, Westmead, Greater Western Sydney, New South Wales; Australia; 33°48′21″S 150°59′05″E

Information
- Type: Independent single-sex secondary day school
- Motto: Latin: Fortior Ito (Go Forth With Strength)
- Religious affiliations: Marist Brothers; Association of Marist Schools of Australia
- Denomination: Roman Catholic
- Patron saint: Saint Marcellin Champagnat
- Established: 1820; 206 years ago
- Founder: John Therry
- Educational authority: New South Wales Department of Education
- Oversight: Catholic Education Office, Diocese of Parramatta
- Principal: Dr Gavin Hays
- Assistant Principals: Dr Daniel Bateman (Curriculum)(Acting); Peter Stephens (Pastoral); Nicole Denniss (Catholic Identity and Mission)
- Teaching staff: 68 (2018)
- Years: 7–12
- Gender: Boys
- Enrolment: 1,047 (2018)
- Campus type: Urban
- Houses: Alman; St. Vincent's; Campion; Harroway
- Colours: Green and gold
- Song: Fortior Ito by Alan Clark
- Nickname: PMHS; PMH; Parra Marist
- Affiliations: Marist Schools Australia
- Website: www.parramarist.nsw.edu.au

The Parramatta Marist High School is an independent Roman Catholic single-sex secondary day school for boys, located in Westmead, a suburb of the western region of Sydney, New South Wales, Australia.

== History ==
Founded in 1820 by John Therry, it was the first Catholic school in Australia, and is the second oldest school in Australia.

Parramatta Marist began under the direction of George Morley. The school was transferred to the site of the present St Patrick's Cathedral in 1837. The school entrusted its operations to the Marist Brothers in 1875, thus becoming Marist Brothers Parramatta (MBP); which changed to 'Parramatta Marist High' when the school moved to Westmead in 1966. Secondary classes were moved in that year to Westmead, leaving only primary classes at the Parramatta site. The Westmead campus was opened in 1966. In 2008, Parramatta Marist High introduced project-based learning into Year 9 which focused on group learning.

== Notable alumni ==
=== Sport ===
- Daniel Anderson, former coach of the Parramatta Eels and St. Helens and current NRL referees boss
- Kwabena Appiah-Kubi, A-League footballer, representing Incheon United FC
- Geoff Brown, Davis Cup tennis player and Wimbledon finalist in singles, doubles, and mixed doubles
- Jason Cayless, former rugby league footballer and NZ representative rugby league player. He is the younger brother of Nathan Cayless
- Nathan Cayless, Australian Schoolboys, Parramatta Eels and NZ representative rugby league player.
- John Devitt, dual Olympic Gold Medallist swimmer
- Paul Gallen, Australian representative rugby league player
- Daniel Irvine, former NRL Rugby League player
- Paul Lynch, sprint canoeist and Olympian
- Jamie Lyon, Rugby league player and former NSW and Australian representative
- Mick Martin, ex-Wallaby and current Sydney to Hobart Yacht Race owner/skipper
- John Muggleton, Rugby League player for Parramatta, Balmain, NSW and Australia. Former defence coach of the Australian Rugby Union Team, the Wallabies; the ACT Brumbies and Melbourne Rebels
- Josan Nimes, Philippine Basketball Association PBA Shooting guard, representing Rain or Shine Elasto Painters
- Chad Robinson, former rugby league footballer
- Darren Stewart, former National Rugby League (NRL) player Penrith & South Sydney
- John Stephens, baseball player and Olympic Silver Medallist
- Alex Twal, NRL rugby league player, representing Wests Tigers
- Chris Warren, former rugby league footballer, television, radio, and sports commentator (son of Ray Warren)
- Stan Wickham, Wallaby player and captain
- David Williams, Australian representative rugby league player
- John Williams, former National Rugby League (NRL) player
- John Wilson, former rugby league footballer

=== Politics ===
- Fred Cahill MBE, politician and Member for Young in the NSW Parliament (1941–1959)
- Jack Ferguson, politician and former Deputy Premier of NSW (1976–1984). Father of federal politicians Laurie Ferguson and Martin Ferguson
- Pat Flaherty, Politician and Member for Granville in the NSW Parliament (1962–1984)
- George Thomas Ford, politician, and Member of the NSW Legislative Council (1964–1966)
- Chris Harris, former City of Sydney councillor and deputy mayor
- Dan Mahoney, Politician and Member for Parramatta in the NSW Parliament (1959–1976)
- Andrew Ziolkowski, Politician and Member for Parramatta in the NSW Parliament (1991–1994)

=== Other ===
- Major General David Valentine Blake, (1887–1965), military officer commanding the unit who shot down and subsequently buried the Red Baron (WW1); and, the most senior officer present at Darwin in 1942 when the Japanese first bombed the city
- Cardinal Edward Clancy, Roman Catholic Archbishop of Sydney (1983–2001)
- Sir John Clancy KBE, CMG (1895–1970), judge and Chancellor of the University of New South Wales (1960–1970)
- Luke Ford, Hollywood actor
- Paul Hogan, actor and comedian
- Professor Chris O'Brien AO, (3 January 1952 – 4 June 2009), oncologist and surgeon
- Brian Tamberlin QC, Justice of the Federal Court of Australia (1994–2009). barrister, law commentator and alumnus of Harvard Law School
- Tony Ward, actor and TV presenter
- Mick Watson, businessman

== See also ==
- List of Catholic schools in New South Wales
- Catholic education in Australia
