= Pete Swanson =

Pete Swanson or Peter Swanson may refer to:

- Pete Swanson (American football), American football player and track and field athlete
- Pete Swanson (musician), member of Yellow Swans
- Peter Swanson (born 1968), American author
- Peter Swanson (rugby) (1946–2003), South African rugby union player
