= Daniel J. Russell =

American judge

Daniel J. Russell (born 1932) is the Senior Judge in the Elizabeth, New Jersey Municipal Court system and one of the oldest sitting judges as of 2009 in the New Jersey Judicial system First appointed in 1993, Russell received national attention when he sentenced parents of truant Elizabeth High School students to community service He was also in the news when presiding over the transfer of accused Chelsea Clinton stalker Vladimir Zelenkov to federal marshals during the time her father was serving as President.

Judge Russell is a graduate of Seton Hall University. After service in the U.S. Army, he began his career on Wall Street, with Lehman Brothers and Park, Ryan Inc. He then attended Seton Hall University School of Law, while working for the Federal Bureau of Investigation. After graduating in 1961, he worked in private practice for over thirty years, specializing in real estate law.

Russell was married to the former Anne Gleason, daughter of Mr. & Mrs. Thomas A. Gleason, granddaughter of Mr. and Mrs. Timothy O'Leary, who died in 2020. They have four children.

== Notes ==
- New York Times, Wednesday, June 4, 1997
- Who's Who of American Catholics 1954
