= Brian Tamberlin =

Australian jurist

The Honourable Brian Tamberlin KC
- Other name: Brian J Tamberlin
- Education: Marist Brothers Parramatta; University of Sydney; Harvard Law School
- Occupations: Judge; Deputy President, Administrative Appeals Tribunal
- Title: Honourable

Brian Tamberlin KC is a retired Australian jurist, barrister, law commentator and justice of the Federal Court of Australia.

Tamberlin was educated at Marist Brothers Parramatta (Class of 1955) where he came 10th in the State in Modern History in the Leaving Certificate that year. He subsequently received both his Bachelor of Arts and Bachelor of Laws from the University of Sydney. He later received his LLM in law from Harvard Law School.

Tamberlin was called to the New South Wales Bar in 1967 specializing in town planning law, commercial law and administrative law and equity, and became a Queen's Counsel in 1981. Tamberlin was appointed a federal court justice in 1994. Tamberlin engaged in lecturing initiatives in legal areas such as federal constitutional law, administrative law and intellectual property in several countries such as the United States, Vietnam and Thailand. He traveled to Indonesia in AusAID programs operated by the Law Faculty for Indonesian judges, with professor Philip Lewis Griffiths. Tamberlin has also served as a justice in the Supreme Court of the Australian Capital Territory. Following Tamberlin's retirement from the federal court of Australia in March 2009, he became the Deputy President of the Administrative Appeals Tribunal, an independent body which reviews the decisions of the Australian Government.

On 27 February 2009, a ceremony marking the retirement of Justice Tamberlin from the federal court was held. Recently, Tamberlin headed a royal commission-style inquiry that was investigating the former Labor government's $5.3 billion sale of NSW electricity assets.
