= Paul Johnstone (disambiguation) =

Paul Johnstone (1930–1996) was a South Africa rugby union player.

Paul Johnstone may also refer to:

- Paul Johnstone (Ontario politician), Canadian politician
- Paul Neil Milne Johnstone (1953–2007), journalist who shared a room with Douglas Adams at school and subsequently appeared as a supporting character in The Hitchhiker's Guide to the Galaxy
- Paul Johnstone (1953-2023), actor in the 1979 movie Mad Max
- Paul Johnstone (1920-1976), first director and producer of The Sky at Night

== See also ==
- Paul Johnston (disambiguation)
- Paul Johnson (disambiguation)
