= Paul Johnston =

Paul Johnston may refer to:

- Paul Johnston (cricketer) (born 1988), English cricketer
- Nick Johnston (politician) (Paul Nicholas Johnston, born 1948), Scottish politician
- Paul Johnston (printer) (1899–1987), fine press printer and book designer
- Paul Johnston (diplomat) (born 1968), British ambassador to Ireland and Sweden
- S. Paul Johnston (1899–1985), American aviation expert and United States Navy captain

== See also ==
- Paul Johnstone (disambiguation)
- Paul Johnson (disambiguation)
