= Shayne Stead =

Australian rugby league footballer

Playing information
- Position: Fullback
Club
Years	Team	Pld	T	G	FG	P
1989	Penrith Panthers	11	1	28	0	60

Shayne Stead is an Australian former professional rugby league footballer who played for the Penrith Panthers.

Stead, a local junior, played first-grade for Penrith in the 1989 NSWRL season. On his first-grade debut against Manly at Brookvale, he scored a try and kicked five goals for Penrith, as a replacement fullback for the injured Neil Baker.

In 1991, he joined South Sydney, but didn't make it into their first-grade side.
