= St Clair Comets =

Australian rugby league football club

Club information
- Full name: St Clair Comets Rugby League Football Club
- Nickname: Comets
- Colours: Red; White; Black
- Founded: 1984

Current details
- Ground: *Peppertree Sports Complex *Peter Kearns Memorial Oval
- CEO: Mick Higgins
- Competition: Penrith Rugby League

Records
- Premierships: 3 (2016,2017,2025)

St Clair Comets Rugby League Football Club is an Australian rugby league football club based in St Clair, New South Wales formed in 1984 as West St Clair. The club now has over 700 registered players and is considered one of the biggest clubs in the Penrith area.

== Notable players ==
- Michael Withers
- Ned Catic
- Matthew Rieck
- Scott McLean
- Wade McKinnon
- Steve Turner
- Dayne Neirinckx
- Frank Pritchard
- Ben Rogers
- Simon Finnigan
- Zeb Taia
- Matt Moylan
- Junior Paulo
- Lancen Joudo
- Kurtley Beale
- Justin Horo
- Joseph Paulo
- Blake Austin
- Sarafu Fatiaki
- Tinirau Arona
- Tepai Moeroa
- Dallin Watene-Zelezniak
- Ryan Walker
- Malakai Watene-Zelezniak
- Stephen Crichton
- Jordan Grant
- Joe Chan
- Luron Patea

== See also ==
- List of rugby league clubs in Australia
- Rugby league in New South Wales
