= Dayne Neirinckx =

Netherlands international rugby league footballer

Personal information
- Born: 25 January 1983 (age 42) Australia

Playing information
- Position: Centre
Club
Years	Team	Pld	T	G	FG	P
2003	Canterbury-Bankstown	1	0	0	0	0
2005	Pia	1	1	0	0	4
2006	Halifax RLFC	3	0	0	0	0
	Total	5	1	0	0	4
Representative
Years	Team	Pld	T	G	FG	P
2006	Netherlands	1	1	0	0	4

Dayne Neirinckx (born 25 January 1983) is an Australian former professional rugby league footballer who played for the Canterbury-Bankstown Bulldogs in the National Rugby League.

A St Clair Comets junior, Neirinckx played in the lower grades for Parramatta, before joining the Canterbury club.

Neirinckx made his only first-grade appearance for the Canterbury side in the club's win over Cronulla in the final round of the 2003 season, as a replacement centre for the injured Nigel Vagana. He remained with the Canterbury outfit in 2004, playing in the reserves competition.

In 2005 he played in France for Pia, then in 2006 competed for English club Halifax. While at Halifax he played under his Dutch passport, meaning he didn't count as an overseas player. After being released by Halifax, he was named in the Netherlands squad for their World Cup qualifying match against Serbia.
