= Paul Johnson (Gaelic footballer) =

Irish Gaelic footballer (born 1986)

Personal information
- Native name: Pól Mac Sheáin (Irish)
- Nickname: Charlo
- Born: 1986 (age 39–40) Clonmel, County Tipperary, Ireland
- Height: 6 ft 2 in (188 cm)

Sport
- Sport: Gaelic football
Clubs
- Years: Club
- 2006-2008: Marlfield; Moyle Rovers
Club titles
- Tipperary titles: 2 (senior football) 1 (junior hurling)
- Munster titles: 1 (junior hurling)
Inter-county
- Years: County
- Tipperary

Paul 'Charlo' Johnson (born 1986) is an Irish retired dual player who lined out at midfield for Moyle Rovers and the Tipperary Gaelic football team.

== Club career ==
Johnson captained Moyle Rovers to its first ever county title at u-21 level in 2007. Later in 2007, he won his first senior county title at club level, which was followed by another title in 2009. Moyle Rovers had its most successful year of hurling in 2008 with Johnson scoring 2-2 from play in the All Ireland Semi Final against Galway's Sylane which set up an All Ireland Final against Conahy Shamrocks GAA in the first game played under lights at Croke Park. The game remained level well into the second half but Conahy Shamrocks GAA pulled clear late on to win by 7 points with Moyle Rovers a man down for most of the game due to a questionable red card.

== Intercounty career ==
Johnson lined out at midfield for Tipperary under Peter Creedon against Cork in the 2007 Munster Under 21 Football Final, with Cork victorious on a scoreline of 3-19 to 3-12 before going on to win the All Ireland. A number of weeks later, he made his senior championship debut under John Owens, starting at midfield in the 2007 Munster semi-final defeat against Cork before departing to play for Chicago Wolfe Tones in the North American Championship. Johnson was part of the Tipperary team that secured promotion for the first time in 27 years from Division 4 when the team beat Mick O'Dwyer's Wicklow in 2008. He played his final game for Tipperary when he lined out as a right-half forward against Limerick in the 2008 All-Ireland Senior Football Championship.

== Honours ==
Tipperary

- National Football League Promotion Division 4: 2008

Moyle Rovers

- Tipperary Senior Football Championship 2007, 2009
- South Tipperary Senior Football Championship 2006, 2007, 2008, 2009
- Tipperary Junior A Hurling Championship 2007
- Munster Junior Club Hurling Championship 2007
- All-Ireland Junior Club Hurling Championship Finalist 2008
