= Garry Longhurst =

Australian rugby league footballer

Personal information
- Full name: Garry Longhurst
- Born: 1964
- Died: 2007

Playing information
- Position: Hooker, Halfback
Club
Years	Team	Pld	T	G	FG	P
1986–87	Penrith Panthers	11	1	0	0	4
1988–89	St. George Dragons	12	0	0	0	0
	Total	23	1	0	0	4
- Source: As of 9 February 2023

Garry Longhurst (1964-2007) was an Australian former professional rugby league footballer who played in the 1980s and 1990s. He played for St. George and Penrith in the New South Wales Rugby League (NSWRL) competition.

== Playing career ==
Longhurst was a Windsor junior who made his first grade debut for Penrith in round 3 of the 1986 NSWRL season against North Sydney at Penrith Stadium. Longhurst scored a try in Penrith's 28–0 victory. He later made a return in the second half of the season, making five more appearances, mostly as starting hooker but played halfback in their 50–14 final round win over Cronulla.

In 1987, he made five more appearances spread across the season, once again a mixture of replacement as well as starting hooker and halfback. In 1988, he signed with St. George and after two seasons at the club headed to Mudgee in 1990, and later played at Gulgong and Lightning Ridge.

== Death ==
Longhurst died in 2007 aged only 43 from motor neurone disease, and was later posthumously named in the Windsor team of the century.
