= Matthew Rieck =

Australian rugby league footballer (born 1980)

Personal information
- Full name: Matthew Rieck
- Born: 8 April 1980 (age 46) Penrith, Australia
- Height: 1.78 m (5 ft 10 in)
- Weight: 82 kg (181 lb; 12 st 13 lb)

Playing information
- Position: Wing
Club
Years	Team	Pld	T	G	FG	P
1999–01	Penrith Panthers	31	8	0	0	32
2002–04	Cronulla-Sutherland	55	31	0	0	124
2005	Wests Tigers	6	3	0	0	12
	Total	92	42	0	0	168
- Source: As of 16 January 2019

Matthew Rieck (born 8 April 1980) is an Australian rugby league footballer who plays for the Dapto Canaries in the Tooheys Illawarra Rugby League first grade competition in New South Wales, Australia. He previously played professionally for the Wests Tigers, Cronulla-Sutherland Sharks and the Penrith Panthers in the National Rugby League, his position of choice was usually on the wing and for much of his career he was considered one of the fastest professional rugby players in the world.

== Background ==
Rieck was born in Penrith, New South Wales, Australia.

== Playing career ==
Rieck originally started out with junior club the St Clair Comets playing 148 games in total for them over several seasons and age groups where he reached the hundred game mark for the club in the 1995 season.

After some impressive performances for the club matched with his impressive pace and skill of continually finding the try line he was signed by the Penrith Panthers.

== Penrith Panthers ==
Rieck made his first grade debut for Penrith in the 1999 season in the round 11 clash against the Newcastle Knights at Penrith Stadium on 16 May. It took him until round 15 that year until he could finally rack up his first points for the club against the New Zealand Warriors where he would eventually score twice.

In total, Rieck played three seasons for Penrith tallying up eight tries in a limited number of opportunities. Rieck's most consistent season at Penrith was his final year at the club in 2001 where he made 14 appearances and scored five tries. Penrith would finish the 2001 NRL season with the Wooden Spoon.

== Cronulla-Sutherland Sharks ==
In 2002 with Chris Anderson taking the reins as the new coach at the Cronulla-Sutherland Sharks, the club quickly signed Rieck from the Penrith.

Rieck made his Cronulla debut in round 1 of 2002 against long-time rivals the St George Illawarra Dragons. Rieck scored once opening his Cronulla try tally and also won the game for the Sharks in the final minutes making him somewhat of a zero turned hero after a below average performance for the majority of the game. Rieck made 16 tries for the season which capped off an impressive start for his new club.

2003 was a year of ups and downs for Rieck; at times he looked brilliant but more often that not simple mistakes and poor ball handling cost him and his team at several times throughout the season. Injuries (particularly with his hamstring) also started to become more frequent for Rieck and he missed several regular-season games. All of this meant Rieck only scored 8 tries for his second season at Cronulla.

The 2004 season become Rieck's last at the Cronulla-Sutherland Sharks as Stuart Raper took over from Chris Anderson towards the end of the season. Injuries continued to plague him and somewhat of a mass re-building of the players at the club took place and it was made known Rieck was surplus to Rapers requirements. In total for his last season at Cronulla he scored 10 times in a mere 15 appearances; also racking up a record in reserves scoring five times in a single game.

== Wests Tigers ==
Rieck was signed by the Wests Tigers at the beginning of the 2005 NRL season and began at his new club by playing in the lower grades before eventually being called up to first grade during the middle of the season for six games in which he would go on to score three times.

A rumoured falling out with Tigers head coach Tim Sheens saw him drop back into the lower grades where he remained for the rest of the season and was eventually released.

== Playing statistics ==
- Has scored 168 points made up from 42 career tries
- Scored 3 tries in a match on two occasions (v. Knights & Roosters)
