= Rod Pethybridge =

Australian rugby league footballer

Personal information
- Full name: Rod Pethybridge
- Born: Sydney, New South Wales, Australia

Playing information
- Position: Fullback, Centre
Club
Years	Team	Pld	T	G	FG	P
1983	Penrith Panthers	1	0	0	0	0
1984	Featherstone Rovers	7	1	0	0	4
1985	Balmain Tigers	8	2	0	0	8
1985–86	York	10	3	4	0	20
1986–87	Western Suburbs	30	13	0	0	52
	Total	56	19	4	0	84
- Source: As of 28 December 2022
- Relatives: Scott Pethybridge (nephew); Gary Pethybridge (brother)

Rod Pethybridge is an Australian former professional rugby league footballer who played in the 1980s. He played for Western Suburbs, Balmain and Penrith in the NSWRL competition. He also played for Featherstone and York in England.

== Background ==
Pethybridge is the brother of former rugby league player Gary Pethybridge who played between 1970-1980. His nephew Scott Pethybridge was also a first grade rugby league player making 108 appearances between 1994-2002.

== Playing career ==
Pethybridge was a Balmain junior but made his first grade debut for Penrith in round 14 of the 1983 NSWRL season against South Sydney. In 1984, Pethybridge spent a year with Featherstone in England before returning to Australia and signing with Balmain. Pethybridge made eight appearances for Balmain in 1985 filling in for injured Garry Jack. Pethybridge would then return to England once more and played for York during the NSWRL off-season. In 1986, Pethybridge signed for Western Suburbs and finished second in the Rothmans Medal voting that season after scoring 12 tries in 23 games. The 1987 season was less successful with the club finishing with the Wooden Spoon and it would be Pethybridge's last in the NSWRL.
