= Glen Yealland =

Australian rugby league footballer

Glenn Yealland
Personal information
- Full name: Glenn Yealland
- Born: Sydney, New South Wales, Australia

Playing information
- Position: Wing
Club
Years	Team	Pld	T	G	FG	P
1992	Penrith Panthers	2	0	0	0	0
- Source: As of 16 January 2019

Glenn Yealland also known as "Glen Yealland" (born in Sydney, New South Wales) is an Australian former rugby league footballer who played for the Penrith Panthers in the National Rugby League competition.
