= Park Ryan =

American municipal bond firm

Park Ryan Inc.
- Company type: Defunct
- Industry: Brokerage
- Founded: 1953
- Founder: Darragh A. Park Jr. James Van Pelt Ryan
- Defunct: 1979; The company was briefly reopened in the 1980s
- Fate: Liquidated
- Headquarters: New York, New York
- Products: Municipal bonds

Park Ryan Inc. was a municipal bond firm on Wall Street, founded in 1953 by Darragh A. Park Jr. and James Van Pelt Ryan.

The firm, based at 70 Pine Street (the American International Building) specialized in government tax-exempt bonds, and later in sinking fund financing.

Park, Ryan participated in numerous syndicates for bond offerings led by large investment banks such as Goldman Sachs, Merrill Lynch, and Dillon, Read & Co., occupying a secondary position alongside such firms as Roosevelt & Cross, Kean, Taylor & Co., and G.H. Walker & Co. The firm was a participating underwriter in the sale of 'Big Mac' bonds for the Municipal Assistance Corporation, created by the State of New York in 1975 to deal with New York City's fiscal crisis.

James Ryan died in 1964. After Darragh Park's death in 1973, Leonard J. Collins succeeded as Chairman of the firm. Collins decided to close and liquidate Park, Ryan in 1979 in response to declines in the bond market caused by the Federal Reserve's tighter monetary policy.

In 1983, a group of investors led by Little Rock, Arkansas bankers Glenn R. Schultz and J.A. McEntire III purchased the firm's name, and opened several branch offices outside of New York. The firm ceased operating in the early 1990s.
