= Stan Presdee =

Australian rugby league footballer

Personal information
- Full name: Stan Presdee

Playing information
- Position: Wing
Club
Years	Team	Pld	T	G	FG	P
1989–92	Western Suburbs	16	1	0	0	4
1993	Penrith Panthers	3	1	0	0	4
	Total	19	2	0	0	8
- Source: As of 28 December 2022

Stan Presdee is an Australian former professional rugby league footballer who played in the 1980s and 1990s. He played for Western Suburbs and the Penrith Panthers in the NSWRL competition.

== Playing career ==
Presdee made his first grade debut for Western Suburbs in round 21 of the 1989 NSWRL season against Penrith which ended in a 37–0 loss at Campbelltown Sports Stadium. Presdee featured sporadically for Western Suburbs over the next four years and played the one finals match for the club which was the 1991 minor preliminary semi-final loss to Canberra. In 1993, Presdee signed for Penrith and initially started the season in reserve grade. In round 7 of the 1993 NSWRL season he was called into the first grade team and made his club debut against Cronulla. Presdee's final game in the top grade came against his former club Western Suburbs where he scored a try in a 24–10 loss.
