= Dallin Watene-Zelezniak =

New Zealand & Tonga international rugby league footballer

Dallin "DWZ" Watene-Zelezniak
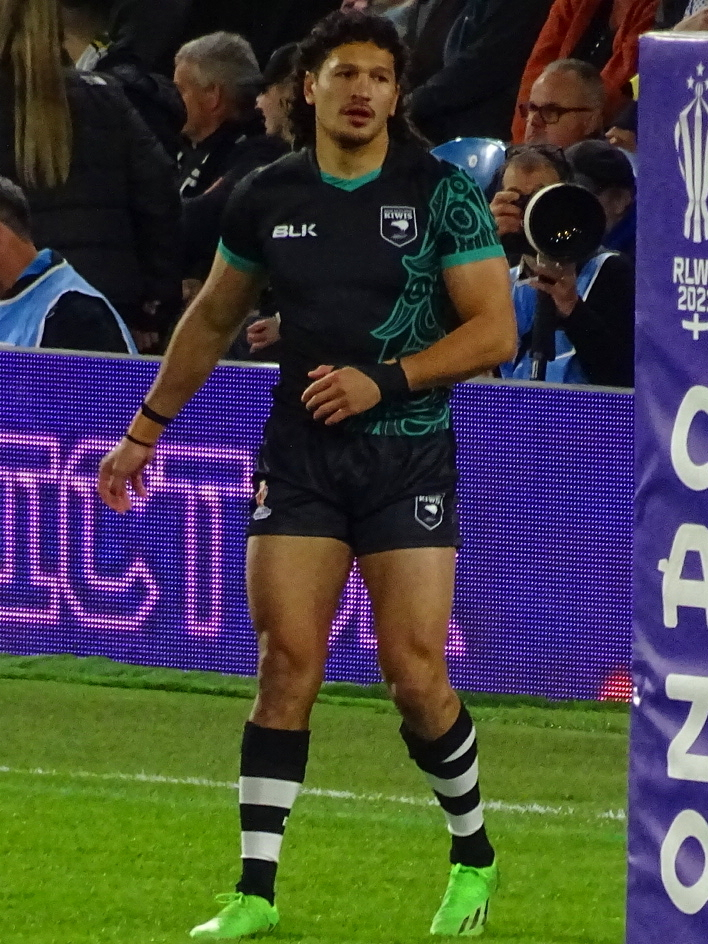

Personal information
- Full name: Dallin Watene-Zelezniak
- Born: 17 August 1995 (age 31) Hamilton, New Zealand
- Height: 186 cm (6 ft 1 in)
- Weight: 97 kg (15 st 4 lb)

Playing information
- Position: Wing, Fullback
Club
Years	Team	Pld	T	G	FG	P
2014–19	Penrith Panthers	106	41	0	0	164
2019–21	Canterbury Bulldogs	37	8	0	0	32
2021–	New Zealand Warriors	107	79	0	0	316
	Total	250	128	0	0	512
Representative
Years	Team	Pld	T	G	FG	P
2016–22	New Zealand	13	9	2	0	40
2020–21	Māori All Stars	2	2	0	0	8
2026–	Tonga	3	0	0	0	0
- Source: As of 22 November 2026
- Education: St Dominic's College, Penrith
- Relatives: Malakai Watene-Zelezniak (brother); Steve Watene (great grandfather)

Dallin Watene-Zelezniak (born 17 August 1995) is a professional rugby league footballer who plays as a winger or fullback for the New Zealand Warriors in the National Rugby League (NRL). He has played for both Tonga and New Zealand at international level.

In the NRL, Watene-Zelezniak has previously played for the Canterbury Bulldogs and the Penrith Panthers.

== Background ==
Watene-Zelezniak was born in Hamilton, New Zealand, and is from Māori, Tongan and Polish descent and is from the Waikato Tainui Iwi. Watene-Zelezniak lived in Ngāruawāhia, before moving to Sydney, New South Wales, Australia as a 5-year old.

He played his junior rugby league for the St Clair Comets, before being signed by the Penrith Panthers. He attended St.Dominic’s College, Penrith.

Watene-Zelezniak is the great-grandson of former New Zealand rugby league captain and politician, Steve Watene. Dallin is the younger brother of former Penrith Panthers and Wests Tigers winger Malakai Watene-Zelezniak.

== Playing career ==
In April 2013, Watene-Zelezniak re-signed with the Panthers on a 2-year contract. On 26 June 2013, in the curtain raiser to Game 2 of the 2013 State of Origin series, Watene-Zelenziak played for New South Wales under 18’s against Queensland under 18’s at Suncorp Stadium, scoring a hattrick of tries in the 56-6 smashing win. On 6 October 2013, Watene-Zelezniak played in the Panthers 2013 Holden Cup Grand Final against the New Zealand Warriors, playing on the wing in the 42–30 victory. Watene-Zelezniak was also selected to play for both the Australian Schoolboys team and Junior Kiwis team. He eventually chose to play for the Junior Kiwis. On 13 October 2013, Watene-Zelezniak played for the Junior Kiwis against the Junior Kangaroos, playing on the wing and scoring 2 tries in the 38–26 loss at WIN Stadium.

=== 2014 ===
In 2014, Watene-Zelezniak moved on to play in the Panthers NSW Cup team, before being included in the Panthers first grade squad. In Round 5 of the 2014 NRL season, Watene-Zelezniak made his NRL debut for the Penrith Panthers against the Canberra Raiders, scoring 2 tries on debut in the Panthers 12–6 win at Penrith Stadium. While playing in the Panthers NSW Cup side, Watene-Zelezniak was hit with a 4-match suspension after he performed an eye gouge on a Wyong Roos player during their 32–24 win. Watene-Zelezniak finished his debut year in the NRL with him playing in 10 matches and scoring 7 tries for the Panthers in the 2014 NRL season. On 7 October 2014, Watene-Zelezniak's impressive late season form saw him included in the New Zealand national rugby league team 24-man squad for the 2014 Four Nations. However he was later ruled out after he suffered a foot injury at training.

=== 2015 ===
On 5 February 2015, Watene-Zelezniak extended his contract with the Panthers until the end of 2016. On 28 April 2015, Watene-Zelezniak was ruled out of making his international debut for New Zealand in the 2015 Anzac Test after he was charged with a dangerous throw on Cronulla-Sutherland Sharks player Wade Graham. The suspension denied Watene-Zelezniak his New Zealand debut for the second time in 6-months. In Round 18, against the Sydney Roosters, Watene-Zelezniak suffered a collapsed lung during the Panthers 24–4 loss at Penrith Stadium and was ruled out for the rest of the season. Watene-Zelezniak finished off the 2015 NRL season with him playing in 16 matches and scoring 7 tries for the Panthers. On 10 November 2015, Watene-Zelezniak extended his contract with the Panthers until the end of 2017.

=== 2016 ===
In February, Watene-Zelezniak was named in the Panthers' 2016 NRL Auckland Nines squad. On 6 May 2016, Watene-Zelezniak made his international debut for New Zealand against Australia in the 2016 Anzac Test, playing on the wing in the 16–0 loss at Hunter Stadium. Watene-Zelezniak finished the 2016 NRL season with him playing in all of the Panthers 26 matches and scoring 12 tries.

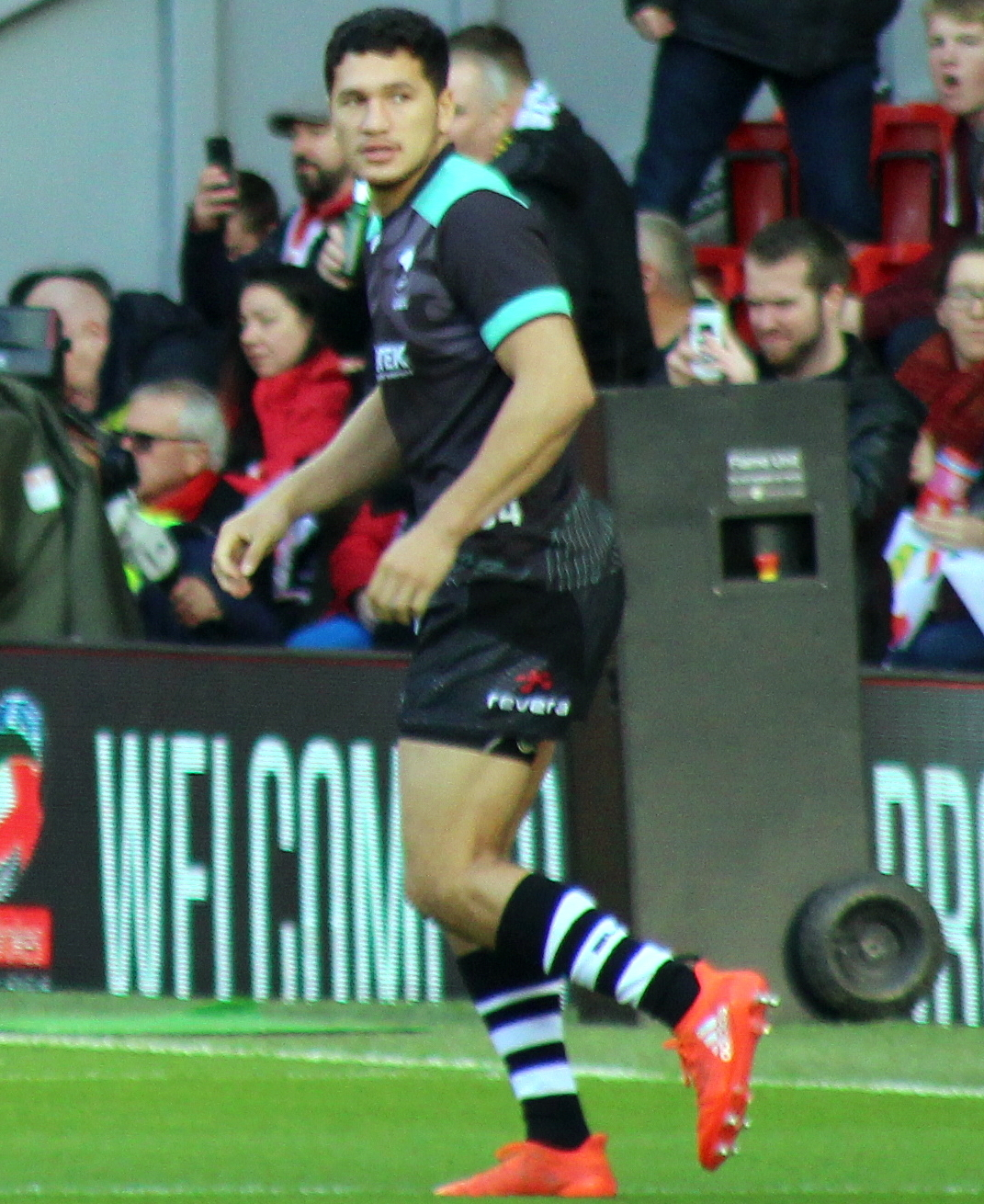
Dallin Watene-Zelezniak warming up for the Kiwis in 2016

At the end of season, Watene-Zelezniak was selected in the New Zealand 24-man squad for the 2016 Four Nations. Watene-Zelezniak played in one match in the tournament, playing at fullback in the Kiwis 18-all draw against Scotland at Derwent Park.

=== 2017 ===
On 3 April 2017, Watene-Zelezniak extended his contract with the Panthers to the end of the 2020 season. On 5 May 2017, Watene-Zelezniak played for New Zealand against Australia in the 2017 Anzac Test, playing on the wing in the 30–12 loss at Canberra Stadium. On 22 July 2017, Watene-Zelezniak was involved in an ugly incident at a junior rugby league match. The Kiwi international who was volunteering as a touch judge between his junior club the St Clair Comets and the St Mary Saints was abused by an official from St Mary's after he put his flag up to signify a St Mary’s player had stepped into touch, the altercation would become physical, with the official putting his hands around the Panthers star’s neck and wrestling with him. "It was very ugly and parents and officials had to take the kids across the field before a few people eventually broke it up," an eyewitness explained. The official was later copped with a lifetime ban from Junior Rugby League. Watene-Zelezniak finished the 2017 NRL season with him playing in 24 matches and scoring 9 tries for the Panthers. On 5 October 2017, Watene-Zelezniak was named in the 24-man New Zealand Kiwis squad for the 2017 Rugby League World Cup. On 11 November 2017, in the Kiwis entertaining clash against Tonga, Watene-Zelezniak scored his first try for the Kiwis in the shock 28–22 loss at Waikato Stadium. Watene-Zelezniak played in 3 matches and scored 1 try for the Kiwis in their disappointing World Cup campaign.

=== 2019 ===
On 9 June 2019, Watene-Zelezniak was released from his contract with the Penrith Panthers effective immediately to sign with the Canterbury-Bankstown Bulldogs.

Watene-Zelezniak made a total of 10 appearances for Canterbury in his first year at the club. During the mid-way part of the season, Canterbury found themselves sitting last on the table and in real danger of finishing with the wooden spoon. However, for the third straight season, Canterbury achieved four upset victories in a row over Penrith, the Wests Tigers, South Sydney and Parramatta who were all competing for a place in the finals series and were higher on the table. Canterbury ended the season in 12th place.

=== 2020 ===
In round 12 of the 2020 NRL season against arch rivals Parramatta, Watene-Zelezniak played the ball in the opposite direction giving a penalty to Parramatta in which they scored off the next play. Canterbury would go on to lose the match 18-16 at ANZ Stadium leaving them on the bottom of the table.

He made a total of 18 appearances for Canterbury in the 2020 NRL season. The club finished in 15th place on the table, only avoiding the Wooden Spoon by for and against.

=== 2021 ===
In round 1 of the 2021 NRL season, he scored two tries for Canterbury in a 32-16 loss against Newcastle.

On 20 June, Watene-Zelezniak played his final game for Canterbury in round 15 against Parramatta which ended in a 36-10 defeat.

He then signed a three-and-a-half-year deal to join the New Zealand Warriors effective immediately.

On 2 July, Watene-Zelezniak played his first game for the New Zealand Warriors in a one point loss to St. George Illawarra.

=== 2022 ===
He made a total of 19 appearances for the New Zealand Warriors in the 2022 NRL season as they finished 15th on the table.

In October he was named in the New Zealand squad for the 2021 Rugby League World Cup. In the second group stage match at the 2021 Rugby League World Cup, Watene-Zelezniak scored four tries in New Zealand's 68-6 victory over Jamaica.#

=== 2023 ===
In round 8 of the 2023 NRL season, Watene-Zelezniak scored two tries in New Zealand's 30-22 loss against Melbourne. In round 14, Watene-Zelezniak scored two tries for New Zealand in their 30-8 victory over the Dolphins. In round 17, Watene-Zelezniak scored four tries as New Zealand defeated St. George Illawarra 48-18. In round 20, Watene-Zelezniak scored two tries for New Zealand in their 44-12 victory over Cronulla. In round 25, Watene-Zelezniak scored a hat-trick in the clubs 29-22 victory over Manly. He played 24 games for the New Zealand Warriors in the 2023 NRL season and scored 27 tries as the club finished 4th on the table and qualified for the finals. He played in all three finals games as the club reached the preliminary final before being defeated by Brisbane. He earned a place in the Dally M team of the year. Finishing with fellow Kiwi's Teammate Jamayne Issako, as Wingers of the year.

=== 2024 ===
In round 26 of the 2024 NRL season, Watene-Zelezniak scored his 100th first grade try in the New Zealand Warriors 30-28 victory over Cronulla. Watene-Zelezniak played 22 games for the club throughout the season and scored 15 tries as they missed the finals. On 18 October 2024, Watene-Zelezniak had re-signed with the Warriors until the end of 2027.

=== 2025 ===
On 12 February, it was announced that Watene-Zelezniak would be ruled out indefinitely after dislocating his wrist during the New Zealand Warriors trial game against Cronulla. He played 17 matches with New Zealand in the 2025 NRL season as the club finished 6th on the table and qualified for the finals. They were eliminated by Penrith in the first week of the finals. Throughout the year, Watene-Zelezniak's defence came under scrutiny by supporters and sections of the media after he let in numerous tries on his side of the field where he was caught out of position.

=== 2026 ===
On 6 July, the New Zealand Warriors announced that Watene-Zelezniak re-signed with the club until the end of 2028. He featured in 22 games for the New Zealand Warriors in the 2026 NRL season and scored 20 tries as the club finished second on the table but were eliminated from the finals in straight sets.

He made his Tonga international début in the 2026 Rugby League World Cup 12-30 win over England on 17 October 2026.

== Statistics ==
Year	Team	Games	Tries	Pts
2014	Penrith Panthers	10	7	28
2015	Penrith Panthers	16	7	28
2016	Penrith Panthers	26	12	48
2017	Penrith Panthers	24	9	36
2018	Penrith Panthers	20	5	20
2019	Penrith Panthers	10	1	4
2019	Canterbury-Bankstown Bulldogs	10	1	4
2020	Canterbury-Bankstown Bulldogs	18	2	8
2021	Canterbury-Bankstown Bulldogs	9	5	20
2021	New Zealand Warriors	9	4	16
2022	New Zealand Warriors	18	9	36
2023	New Zealand Warriors	20	24	96
2024	New Zealand Warriors	22	15	60
2025	New Zealand Warriors	20	5	25
2026	New Zealand Warriors	15	16	64
2027	New Zealand Warriors			
	Totals	243	124	496

== Personal life ==
Dallin Watene-Zelezniak with his brother started a watch company called W Zelezniak. Dallin Watene-Zelezniak is the younger brother of former NRL player Malakai Watene-Zelezniak
