= Peter Swanson (rugby) =

South African rugby player (1946–2003)

Personal information
- Full name: Peter Steven Swanson
- Born: 26 December 1946 East London, Eastern Cape, South Africa
- Died: 26 October 2003 (aged 56) Peterborough, Cambridgeshire, England

Playing information
- Height: 6 ft 0 in (1.83 m)
- Weight: 13 st 8 lb (86 kg)

Rugby union
- Position: Centre
Representative
Years	Team	Pld	T	G	FG	P
1968–72	Transvaal	30
1971	South Africa

Rugby league
- Position: Centre
Club
Years	Team	Pld	T	G	FG	P
1973–74	Penrith	21	6	0	0	18

Peter Steven Swanson (26 December 1946 – 26 October 2003) was a rugby union and rugby league footballer who represented South Africa in rugby union.

== Playing career ==
=== Rugby union ===
Swanson played provincial rugby in South Africa for Transvaal and in 1971 he was selected for the Springboks to tour Australia. He did not play in any test matches for the Springboks and played in four tour matches scoring one try and one conversion.

=== Rugby league ===
In 1972 Swanson signed a contract to play rugby league with Penrith in Sydney, Australia. He played for Penrith for two seasons, 1973 and 1974.

== See also ==
- List of South Africa national rugby union players – Springbok no. 452
- List of Penrith Panthers players
