= Paul Johnson (rugby league, born 1973) =

Australian rugby league footballer (born 1973)

Personal information
- Full name: Paul Johnson
- Born: 8 May 1973 (age 53) Brisbane, Queensland, Australia
- Height: 189 cm (6 ft 2 in)
- Weight: 100 kg (15 st 10 lb)

Playing information
- Position: Prop, Second-row
Club
Years	Team	Pld	T	G	FG	P
1997–98	Penrith Panthers	10	0	0	0	0

Paul Johnson (born 8 May 1973) is an Australian former professional rugby league footballer who played in the 1990s. He played for the Penrith Panthers in the NRL competition.

== Playing career ==
Johnson was a Brisbane junior. In 1997, Johnson joined the Penrith Panthers after spending three seasons with the Brisbane Broncos in the reserve grade side. He was voted the Broncos' Most Consistent Reserve Grade Player for 1996 and he came to the Panthers looking for an opportunity to play first grade after not getting the chance at the Broncos. Johnson made his first grade debut at prop in his side's 30–20 victory over the Perth Reds at Penrith Stadium in the opening round of 1997 Super League season.

Despite being big, strong, and mobile, and known for being a strong defender with a good ‘football brain’, Johnson found it difficult to become a regular first grade player with the Panthers after suffering a career-threatening injury during the 1997 season. Doctors discovered that Johnson had kidney damage and there were fears he would never play again. With the emergence of new players such as; Ned Catic, Jody Gall, Lee Hopkins, Duncan MacGillivray, and Tony Puletua, Johnson found it very difficult to hold down a spot in first grade. Johnson played his final first grade game in his side's 27–16 loss to the Parramatta Eels at Penrith Stadium in round 1 of the 1998 season. Johnson would spend part of the 1998 NRL season on the injury list for Penrith.

He was released from the Panthers at the end of the 1998 season and subsequently never played first grade rugby league again.
