= John Nu'uma'ali'i =

Australian rugby league footballer

Personal information
- Born: 21 May 1985 (age 40); Sydney, Australia
- Height: 1.89 m (6 ft 2 in)
- Weight: 97 kg (15 st 4 lb)

Playing information
- Position: Second-row, Lock
Club
| Years | Team | Pld | T | G | FG | P |
|---|---|---|---|---|---|---|
| 2007 | Penrith Panthers | 1 | 0 | 0 | 0 | 0 |

John Nu'uma'ali'i (born 21 May 1985) is an Australian former professional rugby league footballer who played for the Penrith Panthers.
