= Robbie Duffy =

Australian rugby league footballer

Personal information
- Full name: Robert Joseph Duffy
- Born: 7 May 1980 (age 44); Sydney, New South Wales, Australia

Playing information
- Position: Second-row
Club
| Years | Team | Pld | T | G | FG | P |
|---|---|---|---|---|---|---|
| 2001 | Penrith Panthers | 2 | 0 | 0 | 0 | 0 |

Robbie Duffy (born 7 May 1980) is an Australian former professional rugby league player who played as a second-row forward for the Penrith Panthers in the NRL in the 2000s.

== Playing career ==
A Penrith junior, Duffy was graded by the Penrith Panthers in 2000. He made his first grade debut from the bench in his side's 26−20 loss to the North Queensland Cowboys at Penrith Stadium in round 17 of the 2001 season. His only other first grade appearance came in his side's 40−14 loss to the Bulldogs at Sydney Showground Stadium the following week. Penrith finished the 2001 season with the wooden spoon. Duffy was released by the Panthers at the end of the 2002 season, and subsequently never played first grade rugby league again. He joined the Parramatta Eels in 2003, but never had the opportunity to play first grade there.
