= Bobby Thompson (rugby league) =

Australian rugby league footballer

Personal information
- Full name: Bobby Thompson
- Born: 18 July 1972 (age 53)

Playing information
- Position: Fullback, Centre
Club
| Years | Team | Pld | T | G | FG | P |
|---|---|---|---|---|---|---|
| 1995–98 | Penrith Panthers | 60 | 5 | 0 | 0 | 20 |
| 1999 | Salford | 31 | 5 | 2 | 0 | 24 |
| | Total | 91 | 10 | 2 | 0 | 44 |
- Source: As of 31 January 2023

Bobby Thompson is an Australian former professional rugby league footballer who played in the 1990s. He played for Penrith in the ARL/Super League (Australia) and NRL competitions. Thompson also played for Salford in the Super League.

== Playing career ==
A South West Queensland product, Thompson made his first grade debut in round 5 of the 1995 ARL season against Newcastle at Marathon Stadium. Thompson would go on to play 60 matches for Penrith alternating between centre and fullback. He also featured in the clubs first finals campaign since they claimed the 1991 premiership when they qualified for the 1997 Super League finals series. In 1999, Thompson signed for Super League side Salford playing 31 games as the club finished 12th.
