= Mike Wylie =

Australian rugby league footballer

Personal information
- Born: Penrith, New South Wales, Australia

Playing information
Club
Years	Team	Pld	T	G	FG	P
1968	Penrith Panthers	1	0	0	0	0
- Source: As of 15 October 2010

Mike Wylie (born in Penrith, New South Wales) is an Australian former professional rugby league footballer who played one first grade match for the Penrith Panthers in the 1968 New South Wales Rugby League premiership competition.

Wylie is Panther number 42.

== Sources ==
- Whiticker, Alan & Hudson, Glen (2006) The Encyclopedia of Rugby League Players, Gavin Allen Publishing, Sydney
