= Carl MacNamara =

Australian rugby league footballer

Personal information
- Full name: Carl MacNamara
- Born: 24 November 1972 (age 52); Penrith, New South Wales, Australia

Playing information
- Position: Second-row
Club
| Years | Team | Pld | T | G | FG | P |
|---|---|---|---|---|---|---|
| 1991–01 | Penrith Panthers | 181 | 4 | 0 | 0 | 16 |

Carl MacNamara (born 24 November 1972) is an Australian former professional rugby league footballer who played in the 1990s and 2000s. He played his entire career for Penrith in the NSWRL competition and later the National Rugby League.

== Playing career ==
MacNamara was born and raised in the Penrith district and made his debut for the club in Round 3 1991 against South Sydney. MacNamara went on to make 2 further appearances that season but was not included in the grand final winning team which defeated Canberra. Over the coming years, MacNamara became a regular starter for Penrith and stayed loyal with the club during the super league war. In 1997, MacNamara played finals football for first time as the club finished 5th in the 1997 Super League season. Penrith reached the second week of the finals before being eliminated by Canberra.

In 2000, MacNamara played every game of the season for Penrith as they finished 5th on the table and qualified for the finals. Penrith were knocked out of the finals series in straight sets against Canberra and Parramatta. MacNamara played on in 2001 for one final year which resulted in Penrith coming last and claiming the wooden spoon. MacNamara's final game for the club was a 60-18 loss against eventual premiers Newcastle. In 2017, MacNamara was made a life member of the club.
