= David Elvy =

Australian rugby league footballer

Personal information
- Full name: David Elvy
- Born: 2 April 1978 (age 46)

Playing information
- Position: Lock, Five-eighth
Club
Years	Team	Pld	T	G	FG	P
1998–99	Penrith Panthers	17	0	0	0	0
- Source: As of 30 January 2023

David Elvy is an Australian former professional rugby league footballer who played in the 1990s. He played for Penrith in the NRL competition.

== Playing career ==
Elvy was a Parkes junior who led the Penrith club to the Under 19s Super League title in 1997. Elvy made his first grade debut for Penrith in round 15 of the 1998 NRL season against Manly at Brookvale Oval. Elvy played a total of 17 games for Penrith over two years. Elvy was a squad member at Penrith in 2001 and 2001 but only managed to get game time with the NSW Cup squad. In 2002, he moved to the Bathurst Panthers in the Group 10 competition, and as captain coach led the side to back to back premierships in 2006 and 2007, before moving into full time coaching with the NSW Country Firsts and Western Division. In 2017, Elvy was made a life member of the Bathurst Panthers.
