= Brett Atkinson =

Australian rugby league footballer

Personal information
- Full name: Brett Atkinson
- Born: 6 September 1976 (age 48)

Playing information
- Position: Fullback
Club
Years	Team	Pld	T	G	FG	P
1999–02	Penrith Panthers	14	3	0	0	12
- Source: As of 30 January 2023

Brett Atkinson is an Australian former professional rugby league footballer who played in the 1990s and 2000s. He played for Penrith in the NRL competition.

== Playing career ==
Atkinson made his first grade debut for Penrith in round 16 of the 1999 NRL season against Balmain at Leichhardt Oval. Atkinson did not feature for Penrith in the 2000 season but returned to the first grade team in 2001 making nine appearances as the club finished with the Wooden Spoon. Atkinson made his final appearance for Penrith in round 17 of the 2002 NRL season against South Sydney.

== Coaching career ==
Atkinson coached the Penrith Harold Matthews Cup team in the 2010s before signing on as St Mary's women's head coach in 2021.
