= Malakai Watene-Zelezniak =

Australian rugby league footballer

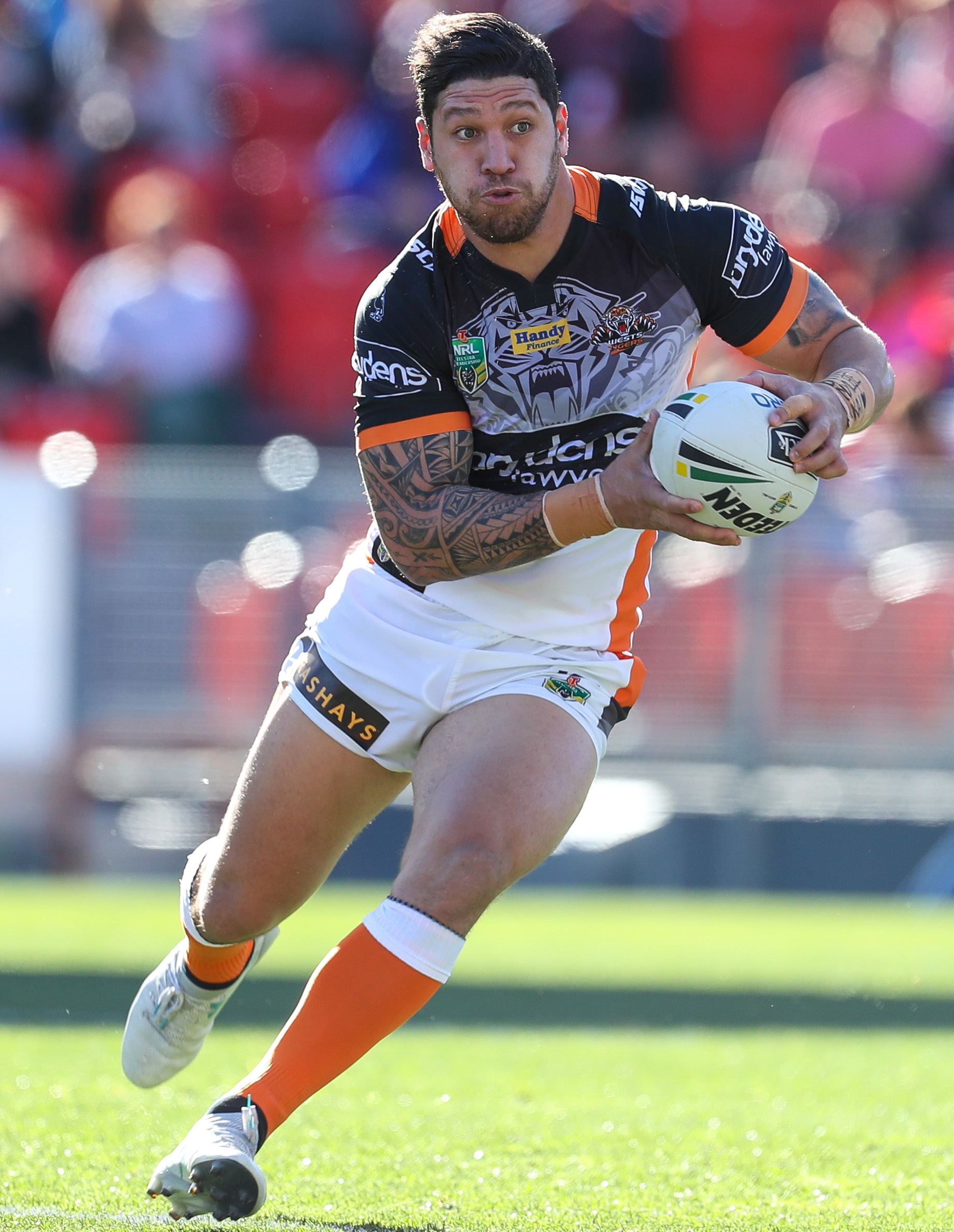

Personal information
- Born: 28 August 1991 (age 35) Sydney, New South Wales, Australia

Playing information
- Height: 186 cm (6 ft 1 in)
- Weight: 94 kg (14 st 11 lb)

Rugby league
- Position: Wing, Centre
Club
Years	Team	Pld	T	G	FG	P
2017	Penrith Panthers	1	0	0	0	0
2017–18	Wests Tigers	25	9	0	0	36
2019–20	Penrith Panthers	5	1	0	0	4
	Total	31	10	0	0	40
Representative
Years	Team	Pld	T	G	FG	P
2019	Tonga 9s	3	1	0	0	4
2023	Poland	1	1	0	0	4

Rugby union
- Position: Wing, Centre
Club
Years	Team	Pld	T	G	FG	P
2014	NSW Country Eagles	4	0	0	0	0
- Relatives: Dallin Watene-Zelezniak (brother); Steve Watene (great grandfather)

Malakai Watene-Zelezniak (born 27 August 1991) is a former rugby league footballer who played on the wing. He played for the Penrith Panthers in two separate spells, and the Wests Tigers in the NRL.

Watene-Zelezniak briefly played rugby union for the New South Wales Country Eagles in the National Rugby Championship.

== Background ==
Watene-Zelezniak was born in Sydney, New South Wales, Australia, and is of Māori, Tongan and Polish descent.

He played his junior rugby league for the St Clair Comets. He attended St. Dominic’s College, Penrith.

Watene-Zelezniak is the great-grandson of former New Zealand rugby league captain and politician, Steve Watene. Watene-Zelezniak is a member of the Church of Jesus Christ of Latter-day Saints. Malakai is the older brother of the New Zealand Warriors winger Dallin Watene-Zelezniak.

== Playing career ==
=== Early career ===
Watene-Zelezniak played for the Penrith Panthers in the NYC from 2009 to 2011.

In 2014, he joined the New South Wales Country Eagles of the National Rugby Championship. He played in four of their matches.

Watene-Zelezniak returned to the Panthers during the 2015 season to play in their New South Wales Cup team.

On 25 September 2015, Watene-Zelezniak was named in Tonga's preliminary train-on squad ahead of their 2017 World Cup qualifying match against the Cook Islands.

He was selected to represent the New Zealand Māori in their match against the New Zealand Residents on 15 October 2016.

=== 2017 ===
In February, Watene-Zelezniak was a member of the Panthers' Auckland Nines squad. He made his NRL debut for the Panthers against the South Sydney Rabbitohs on 7 April. His selection came after Matt Moylan, Waqa Blake and Peta Hiku were dropped for disciplinary reasons. He played on the wing outside his younger brother Dallin, who said. "I had a feeling at the start of the week he was going to make his debut because they asked me to play left centre. Mal was training well, so I went over to him and said, 'I think you’re playing this week'."

On 29 April, it was announced that Watene-Zelezniak had been released from the Panthers to immediately join the Wests Tigers until the end of 2018. He made his club debut for the Tigers on 12 May, also against the Rabbitohs. Coach Ivan Cleary, who was head coach when Watene-Zelezniak played in the lower grades at the Panthers and brought him to Wests Tigers, said "When we signed him, I never thought he'd play so much. He's really improved. He's improved on some fundamental stuff and each game he's improved."

=== 2018 ===
Watene-Zelezniak made 12 appearances for Wests Tigers and scored 3 tries as the club missed out on the finals by finishing 9th on the table. He then departed the club at the end of the season to re-join Penrith on a two-year deal.

=== 2019 ===
Watene-Zelezniak only made four appearances for Penrith in the 2019 NRL season as the club finished a disappointing 10th on the table and missed out on the finals.

=== 2020 ===
Watene-Zelezniak played only one game for Penrith in the 2020 NRL season. In October, he was released by the club.

On 21 January 2021, Watene-Zelezniak announced his immediate retirement from rugby league due to acute kidney failure and associated complications.

=== 2023 ===
On 23 Oct 2023 it was reported that he had made his debut for Poland 40-8 win over North Macedonia in Sydney

== Personal life ==
Malakai Watene-Zelezniak with his brother started a watch Company W Zelezniak.
