= Marty O'Connell =

Australian rugby league footballer

Personal information
- Full name: Martin O'Connell
- Born: 13 April 1979 (age 46); Sydney, New South Wales, Australia

Playing information
- Position: Wing
Club
Years	Team	Pld	T	G	FG	P
1999–01	Penrith Panthers	3	0	0	0	0

Marty O'Connell (born 13 April 1979) is an Australian former professional rugby league footballer who played in the 1990s and 2000s. He played for the Penrith Panthers in the NRL. His position of choice was wing.

== Playing career ==
O'Connell was a Penrith junior. He made his first grade debut from the bench in his side's 28−0 loss to the Brisbane Broncos at ANZ Stadium in round 14 of the 1999 season. He played in 2 more games for the Penrith Panthers during the 2001 NRL season which includes a victory over the Canberra Raiders and a loss to Melbourne Storm in round 23 and 24 respectively. The Panthers finished the 2001 season with the wooden spoon. O'Connell left the Panthers at the end of the 2001 season, and subsequently never played first-grade rugby league again.
