= Brad Waugh =

Australian rugby league footballer

Personal information
- Full name: Brad Waugh
- Born: 14 February 1957 (age 68); Sydney, New South Wales, Australia

Playing information
- Position: Prop, Second-row
Club
| Years | Team | Pld | T | G | FG | P |
|---|---|---|---|---|---|---|
| 1976–85 | Penrith Panthers | 85 | 3 | 0 | 0 | 10 |
| 1983–84 | Wakefield Trinity | 16 | 1 | 0 | 0 | 4 |
| | Total | 101 | 4 | 0 | 0 | 14 |

Brad Waugh (born 14 February 1957) is an Australian former professional rugby league footballer who played during the 1970s and 1980s. He played most of his career at the Penrith Panthers, but he also had a brief stint at Wakefield Trinity. He played primarily at prop, but also played the occasional game at second-row

== Playing career ==
A St. Marys junior, Waugh was graded by the Panthers in 1975. He made his first grade debut at second-row in his side's 12–5 loss to the Balmain Tigers at Penrith Park in round 18 of the 1976 season. He remained a loyal club man over the next decade at Penrith, despite the club's troubled times both on and off the field. Waugh was a constant selection in the Penrith forward pack throughout the late-1970s to mid-1980s. He had his best season at the club in the 1983 season, he played in 24 of his side's 26 games.

Waugh had a stint with English Championship side Wakefield Trinity in 1983/84 season before returning to the Panthers for the start of the 1984 season. He made his final first grade appearance in his side's 20–6 loss to the Canterbury Bulldogs at Penrith Park in round 25 of the 1985 season. In total, Waugh played 85 games, and scored 3 tries.

== Post playing ==
Post retirement, Waugh has retained ties with the club, being the head of the Panthers community program “Panthers on the Prowl”.
