= Thomas Jenkins (rugby league) =

Australian rugby league footballer

Tom Jenkins
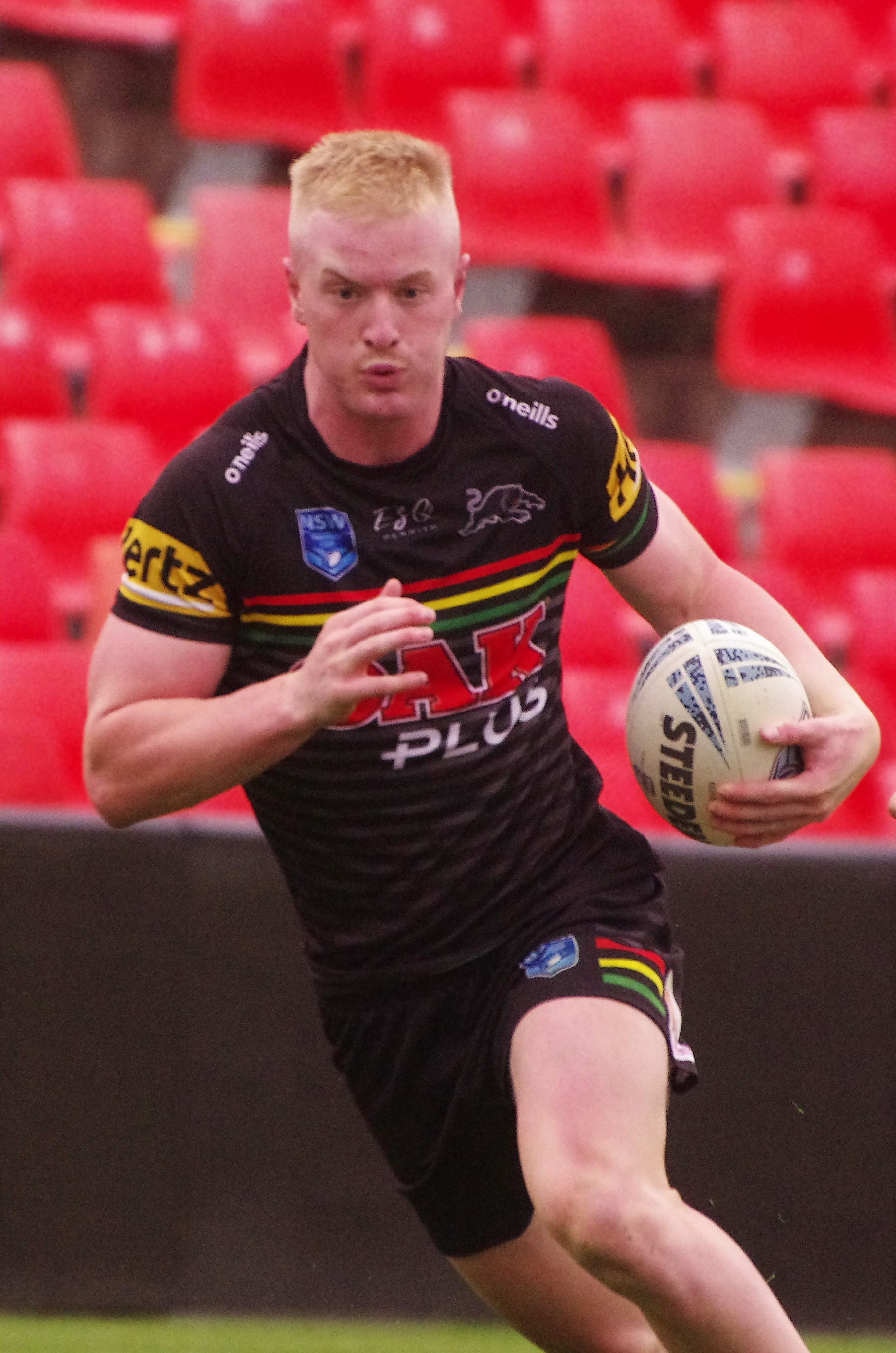

Personal information
- Full name: Thomas Jenkins
- Born: 16 March 2001 (age 25) Boorowa, New South Wales, Australia
- Height: 188 cm (6 ft 2 in)
- Weight: 94 kg (14 st 11 lb)

Playing information
- Position: Wing, Centre
Club
Years	Team	Pld	T	G	FG	P
2022–23	Penrith Panthers	6	5	0	0	20
2024	Newcastle Knights	5	0	0	0	0
2025–	Penrith Panthers	47	43	0	0	172
	Total	58	48	0	0	192
- Source: As of 22 November 2026

Thomas Jenkins (born 16 March 2001) is an Australian professional rugby league footballer who plays as a winger or centre for the Penrith Panthers in the National Rugby League.

He previously played for the Newcastle Knights in the National Rugby League (NRL).

== Background ==
Born in Boorowa, New South Wales, Jenkins played his junior rugby league for the Young Cherrypickers.

== Playing career ==
=== Early years ===
In 2019, Jenkins played for the Riverina team in the Laurie Daley Cup. In 2020, he was signed by the Penrith Panthers to play in their Jersey Flegg Cup side.

=== 2022 ===
In round 25 of the 2022 NRL season, Jenkins made his NRL debut for the Panthers against the North Queensland Cowboys. It would be his only first-grade appearance of the year.

=== 2023 ===
In round 16 of the 2023 NRL season, Jenkins scored his first try in the top grade during Penrith's 23-27 golden point extra-time loss to North Queensland. In round 20, he scored two tries for Penrith in their 24-14 victory over the Dolphins.

In October, Jenkins signed a two-year contract with the Newcastle Knights, starting in 2024.

=== 2024 ===
Jenkins played five matches for the Newcastle outfit in the 2024 season, before asking to be released early from his contract at the end of the season.

=== 2025 ===
In round 9 of the 2025 NRL season, Jenkins scored two tries for Penrith in their 32-8 victory over Brisbane. In round 14, Jenkins scored a hat-trick in Penrith's 18-14 win over the Wests Tigers. Jenkins played 21 games for Penrith in the 2025 NRL season as the club finished 7th on the table. He did not feature in the clubs finals campaign.

=== 2026 ===
In round 3 of the 2026 NRL season, Jenkins scored four tries for Penrith in their 40-4 win over the Sydney Roosters. In round 5, Penrith defeated Melbourne 50-10 with Jenkins scoring two tries. In the process, Jenkins became the first player in NSWRL/NRL History to score 12 tries in the opening five rounds of the season. In round 6 he equalled Alex Johnston's record of six consecutive games with 2 tries or more. On 12 June, the Penrith outfit announced that Jenkins re-signed with the club until the end of 2029. In round 18, Jenkins scored a hat-trick in Penrith's victory over South Sydney. In round 21 of the 2026 NRL season, Jenkins scored his 26th try over a 24-18 win against the Parramatta Eels, breaking the record for most tries in a single season as a Penrith Panthers player. Jenkins finished the season with 30 tries in 26 matches. Jenkins played in Penrith's upset preliminary final loss to Newcastle.

== Statistics ==
Year	Team	Games	Tries	Pts
2022	Penrith Panthers	1		
2023	Penrith Panthers	5	5	20
2024	Newcastle Knights	5		
2025	Penrith Panthers	21	13	52
2026	Penrith Panthers	19	28	112
2027	Penrith Panthers			
	Totals	51	46	184
