= Darren Stewart (rugby league) =

Australian rugby league footballer

Personal information
- Full name: Darren Stewart
- Born: 11 January 1969 (age 56)

Playing information
- Position: Wing
Club
Years	Team	Pld	T	G	FG	P
1990–91	Penrith Panthers	11	0	0	0	0
1992	South Sydney	1	0	0	0	0
1993	Penrith Panthers	2	0	0	0	0
	Total	14	0	0	0	0
- Source: As of 31 January 2023

Darren Stewart is an Australian former professional rugby league footballer who played in the 1990s. He played for Penrith and South Sydney in the NSWRL competition.

== Playing career ==
Stewart made his first grade debut in round 5 of the 1990 NSWRL season against Brisbane at Lang Park. Stewart played a total of seven games for Penrith in his first season mainly from the bench or on the wing. The following year, Stewart was part of the squad which claimed the 1991 premiership, Penrith's first since entering the competition in 1967. In 1992, Stewart signed for South Sydney and played in their opening round defeat against Parramatta and also two pre-season matches. He returned to Penrith in 1993 where he played two further games for the club.
