= Ned Catic =

Australian rugby league footballer

Personal information
- Full name: Nedzad Catic
- Born: 2 August 1978 (age 47); Sydney, New South Wales, Australia

Playing information
- Height: 189 cm (6 ft 2 in)
- Weight: 109 kg (17 st 2 lb)
- Position: Prop, Second-row
Club
Years	Team	Pld	T	G	FG	P
1996–02	Penrith Panthers	46	5	0	0	20
2003–05	Sydney Roosters	44	4	0	0	16
2006–07	Wakefield Trinity Wildcats	49	5	0	0	20
2008–09	Castleford Tigers	14	3	0	0	12
2009–11	Barrow Raiders	65	40	0	0	160
	Total	218	57	0	0	228

Ned Catic (born 2 August 1978) is an Australian former professional rugby league footballer who played in the 1990s and 2000s. He played at club level for the Penrith Panthers, Sydney Roosters, Wakefield Trinity, Castleford Tigers and the Barrow Raiders.

== Background ==
Catic was born in Sydney, New South Wales, Australia, and is of Bosnian descent.

He played his junior rugby league for the St Clair Comets, before being signed by the Penrith Panthers.

== Playing career ==
Catic played prop for the Sydney Roosters in the 2003 NRL grand final which was lost to the Penrith Panthers. Having won the 2002 NRL Premiership, the Roosters traveled to England to play the 2003 World Club Challenge against Super League champions, St Helens R.F.C. in which Catic played at from the interchange bench in Sydney's victory.

Catic played for the Roosters from the interchange bench in their 2004 NRL grand final loss to cross-Sydney rivals, the Canterbury-Bankstown Bulldogs.

== Honours ==
Sydney Roosters

- 2003 World Club Challenge
- 2003 NRL Grand Final Runner-Up
- 2004 NRL Grand Final Runner-Up
