= Leslie White (rugby league, fl. 1982–88) =

Australian rugby league footballer

Personal information
- Full name: Leslie White
- Born: unknown

Playing information
- Position: Prop
Club
Years	Team	Pld	T	G	FG	P
1982–84	Penrith Panthers	11	1	0	0	4
1987	Western Suburbs	16	1	0	0	4
1988	South Sydney	4	0	0	0	0
	Total	31	2	0	0	8

Leslie "Les" White (birth unknown) is a former professional rugby league footballer who played in the 1980s. He played at club level for Penrith, Western Suburbs and South Sydney, as a prop.

== Playing career ==
White made his first grade debut for Penrith against Western Suburbs in round 21 1982 at Penrith Park. In his time at the Penrith, the club failed to reach the finals.

In 1987, White joined Western Suburbs and made 16 appearances in his only seasons there as they finished last on the table.

In 1988, White signed with South Sydney and made four appearances in his time at Souths before departing the club after just one year.
