= Sione Fonua =

New Zealand rugby league footballer

John Fonua
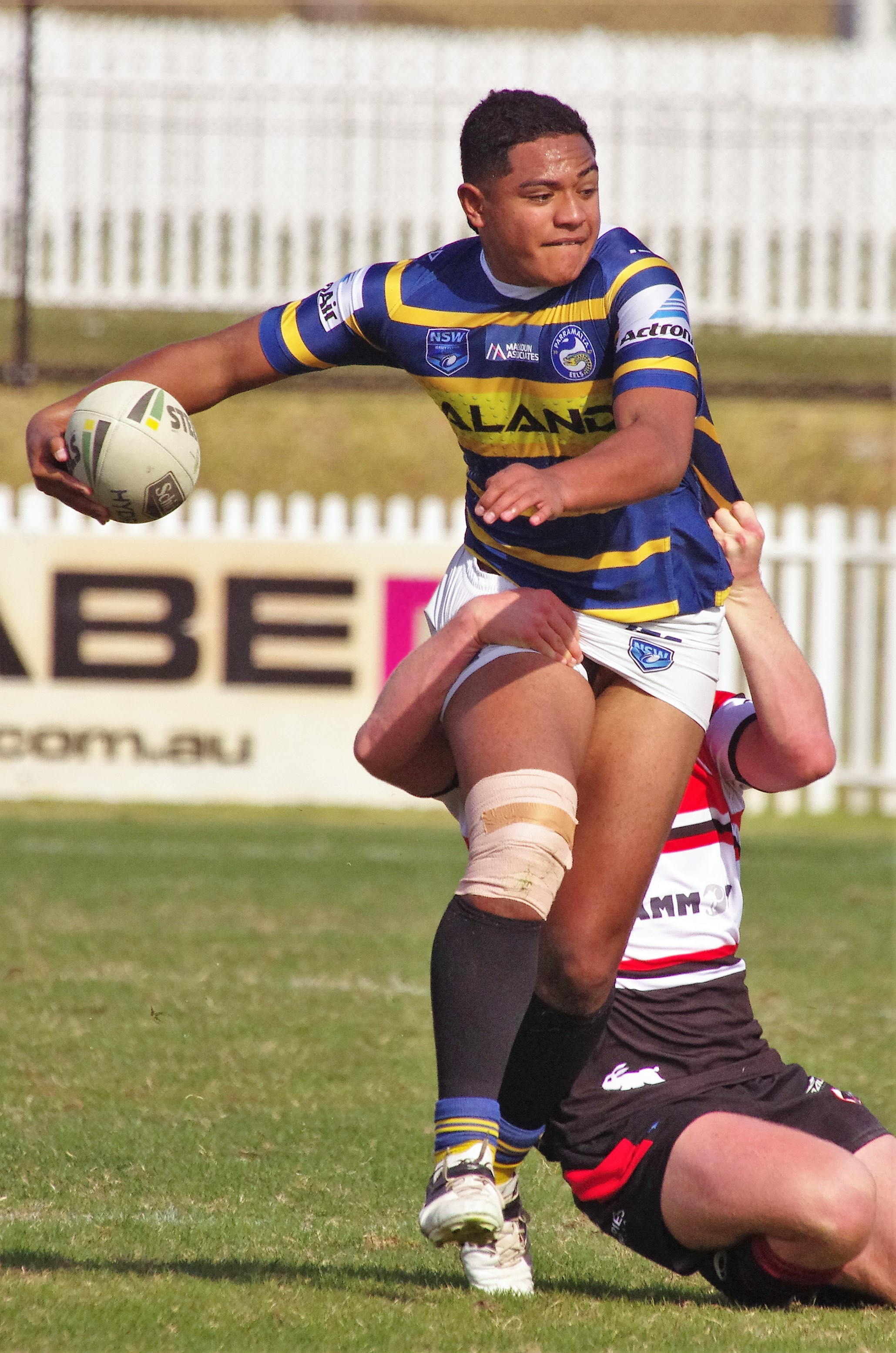

Personal information
- Full name: Sione Fonua
- Born: 7 July 1999 (age 27)

Playing information
- Position: Centre, Wing, Fullback
Club
Years	Team	Pld	T	G	FG	P
2025–	Penrith Panthers	1	0	0	0	0
- Source: As of 21 September 2025

Sione Fonua is an Australian professional rugby league footballer who plays as a centre and Fullback for the Penrith Panthers in the National Rugby League and NSW Cup.

== Background ==
Fonua was a Parramatta Eels junior, playing for the Holden Cup team. In 2017, Fonua was named for the NSW U18's squad. In 2020, Fonua returned to football playing in the Penrith pathways system.

== Career ==
In Round 26 2025, Fonua made his NRL debut for Penrith against the Canterbury-Bankstown Bulldogs, playing Centre in a 28-4 loss at Accor Stadium.
