= Neil Baker =

Australian rugby league footballer

Personal information
- Born: 8 June 1960 (age 65)

Playing information
- Position: Fullback, Five-eighth
Club
Years	Team	Pld	T	G	FG	P
1981–83	Canterbury-Bankstown	25	7	4	0	33
1984–87	South Sydney	87	15	206	31	503
1985–86	Salford	19	11	11	7	73
1988–89	Penrith	41	7	115	14	272
	Total	172	40	336	52	881

Neil Baker (born 8 June 1960) is a former professional rugby league footballer who played in the 1980s. Baker played mostly at fullback and five-eighth for Canterbury, Salford, South Sydney Rabbitohs and Penrith.

Neil Baker played three seasons at the Canterbury-Bankstown Bulldogs between 1981-1983. He also was a useful goal-kicker, top scoring for South Sydney Rabbitohs in 1984, 1985 and 1986. In 1985 he won the Dally M award for best five-eighth of the season. Baker had a cult following at South Sydney, with fans calling him "Bionic Baker", and making banners with his name on them to wave at matches. He finished his Sydney career at the Penrith Panthers between 1988-1989. In 1992, Baker captain-coached Newcastle Western Suburbs to win the Clayton Cup.
