= Danny Russell (rugby league, born 1983) =

Australian professional rugby league footballer

Personal information
- Full name: Daniel Russell
- Born: 13 June 1983 (age 41); Penrith, New South Wales, Australia

Playing information
- Position: Halfback, Five-eighth
Club
Years	Team	Pld	T	G	FG	P
2004	Penrith Panthers	3	0	0	0	0

Danny Russell (born 13 June 1983) is an Australian former professional rugby league footballer who played in the 2000s. He played for the Penrith Panthers. He played as either a five-eighth or halfback.

== Playing career ==
Russell made his first grade debut from the bench in his side's 22−18 victory over the North Queensland Cowboys in round 11 of the 2004 season. He played in 2 more games for the Penrith Panthers during the 2004 NRL season which includes losses to the Manly Warringah Sea Eagles and St. George Illawarra Dragons in round 13 and 14 respectively. Russell was released by the Panthers at the end of the 2004 season, and subsequently never played first grade rugby league again.
