= Gary Pethybridge =

Australian rugby league footballer

Personal information
- Full name: Gary Richard Pethybridge
- Born: 6 November 1950 (age 75) Sydney, New South Wales, Australia

Playing information
- Position: Centre
Club
Years	Team	Pld	T	G	FG	P
1970–72	Parramatta Eels	31	9	0	0	27
1973–74	St George	33	9	0	0	27
1978–80	Penrith Panthers	32	5	0	0	15
	Total	96	23	0	0	69
Representative
Years	Team	Pld	T	G	FG	P
1973	New South Wales	1	0	0	0	0
- Relatives: Scott Pethybridge (son); Rod Pethybridge (brother)

Gary Pethybridge (born 6 November 1950) is an Australian former rugby league footballer who played in the 1970s.

== Career ==
Pethybridge was a Parramatta junior and was graded with the Parramatta Eels in 1970.

By 1973 he had moved to St. George Dragons and he had a wonderful season in his debut year at Saints which included one representative match for New South Wales in the same year. He helped steer the Dragons into the semi-finals in 1973 and a bright career looked certain, but he suffered a chronic neck injury caused by being kneed in the back in 1974 that derailed his career at St. George and he virtually retired. He returned from injury three years later with the Penrith Panthers and he played three seasons with them between 1978-1980 and captained the club before retiring permanently in 1981.
