= Scott Pethybridge =

Australian rugby league footballer

Personal information
- Born: 25 June 1977 (age 49) Sydney, New South Wales, Australia
- Height: 182 cm (6 ft 0 in)
- Weight: 90 kg (14 st 2 lb; 200 lb)

Playing information
- Position: Wing
Club
Years	Team	Pld	T	G	FG	P
1994–96	Penrith Panthers	34	10	7	0	54
1997–99	North Sydney	55	16	0	0	64
2000	Auckland Warriors	14	0	1	0	2
2001–02	Northern Eagles	5	3	1	0	14
	Total	108	29	9	0	134
- Source: As of 16 January 2019
- Father: Gary Pethybridge
- Relatives: Rod Pethybridge (uncle)

Scott Pethybridge (born 25 June 1977) is an Australian former professional rugby league footballer who played for four clubs over his career. Pethybridge mainly played on the wing; although, he was somewhat of a utility back. His father, Gary, played rugby league in the 1970s. His uncle Rod also played professional rugby league.

== Playing career ==
Pethybridge was 17 years old when he made his debut in the NSWRL Premiership, for the Penrith Panthers. Pethybridge went on to play thirty-four games for the Panthers before leaving during the Super League war.

In 1996, he was part of the Junior Kangaroos tour of Fiji. After deciding to align himself with the Australian Rugby League, Scott joined the North Sydney Bears. He played 55 games for the club and was a regular in the side. However, when the Bears merged with the Manly Warringah Sea Eagles at the end of 1999, Pethybridge was not selected to be part of the new combined squad. Pethybridge was a member of the North Sydney side which played its final first grade game against The North Queensland Cowboys in Townsville.

This left him searching for a new club, and he ended up joining the Auckland Warriors for the 2000 season. He returned to Australia in 2001, where he played five games over the next two years for the Northern Eagles before retiring.

== Post playing ==
Pethybridge is now involved in horse racing.
