= Billy Phillips (rugby league) =

Australian rugby league footballer (born 2004)

Personal information
- Full name: Billy Phillips
- Born: 3 May 2004 (age 22) Temora, New South Wales, Australia

Playing information
- Position: Lock
Club
Years	Team	Pld	T	G	FG	P
2025–	Penrith Panthers	24	2	0	0	8
- Source: As of 15 November 2026

Billy Phillips (born 3 May 2004) is an Australian professional rugby league footballer who plays as a lock for the Penrith Panthers in the NRL.

== Early life ==
Born in Temora, New South Wales, Phillips was raised on a crop and sheep farm in the small Central West town of Lake Cargelligo. He attended a local primary school and afterwards boarded at Red Bend Catholic College in Forbes. While playing junior rugby league in Forbes, and representing the Western Rams, Phillips was scouted by the Penrith Panthers in 2021, joining the club as a 17-year-old

== Career ==
Phillips, a lock forward, played in the SG Ball Cup and Jersey Flegg Cup during his first three seasons in Penrith, before establishing himself in their NSW Cup side in 2025. He made his first-grade debut in the penultimate round of the 2025 NRL season against Canterbury-Bankstown.

In the 2026 season, Phillips was a regular fixture for Penrith playing off the bench, with his 23 appearances including a first finals campaign. He was named "Rookie of the Year" at the end of season awards presentation. After signing a contract extension, Phillips is set to remain with the Panthers through to the end of 2029.
