= Jesse McLean =

Australian rugby league footballer

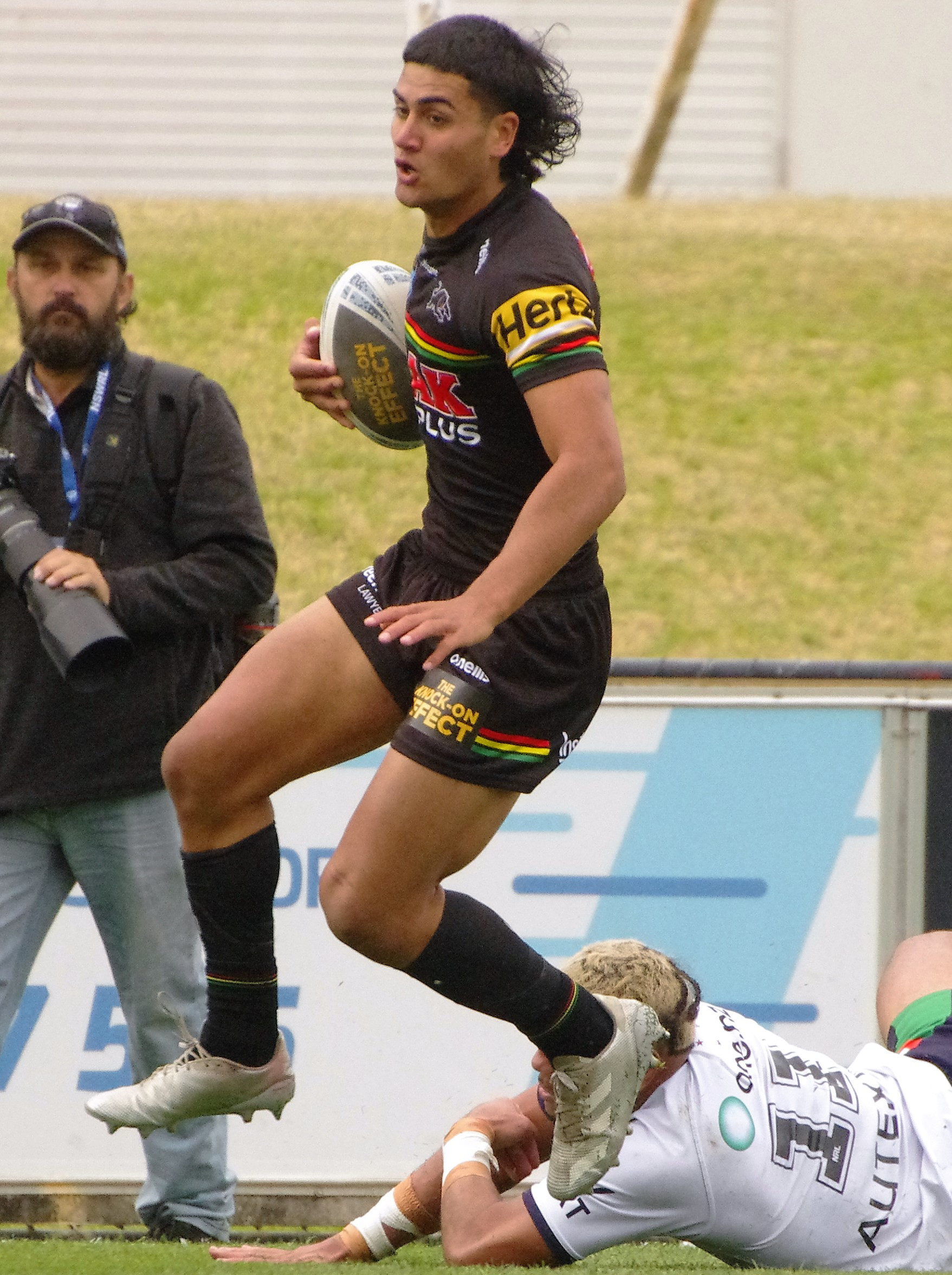

Personal information
- Full name: Jesse McLean
- Born: 17 January 2005 (age 21) Blacktown, New South Wales, Australia
- Height: 185 cm (6 ft 1 in)
- Weight: 90 kg (14 st 2 lb)

Playing information
- Position: Wing
Club
Years	Team	Pld	T	G	FG	P
2023–26	Penrith Panthers	4	1	0	0	4
Representative
Years	Team	Pld	T	G	FG	P
2025	Māori All Stars	1	0	0	0	0
- Source: As of 10 November 2025
- Father: Willie McLean
- Relatives: Casey McLean (brother); Tiaki Chan (cousin); Joe Chan (cousin); Alex Chan (uncle)

Jesse McLean is an Australian rugby league footballer who plays as a winger for the Penrith Panthers in the National Rugby League (NRL).

== Playing career ==
McLean played his junior rugby league for Doonside Roos & Blacktown City Bears in the Penrith District Junior Rugby League. He is of Māori descent and also played rugby union whilst at school. McLean is the brother of fellow Penrith player Casey McLean, and is cousins with Joe Chan who plays for the Melbourne Storm and Tiaki Chan who plays for Wigan Warriors. McLean is the nephew of Alex Chan.

=== 2023 ===
McLean made his NRL debut in Round 26 against the Parramatta Eels.

=== 2024 ===
On 20 June, McLean signed a long term extension with Penrith until the end of 2028.

=== 2026 ===
In September, McLean played for Penrith's NSW Cup team in their Grand Final victory over Newtown.
