= Cambridge Park RLFC =

Cambridge Park Cranebrook JRLFC
Club information
- Full name: Cambridge Park Cranebrook Junior Rugby League Football Club
- Nickname(s): Cambo, Parkies
- Colours: White; Brown; Yellow
- Founded: 1968

Current details
- Ground: Allsopp Patterson Oval
- Competition: Penrith District Rugby League

Cambridge Park Cranebrook Junior Rugby League Football Club is an Australian rugby league football club based in Cambridge Park, New South Wales formed in 1968.

== Notable players ==
- Des Hasler
- Steve Robinson
- Jamie Olejnik
- Greg Alexander
- John Cartwright
- Ben Alexander
- Troy Wozniak
- Darrien Doherty
- Brad Fittler
- Nathan Barnes
- Glen Liddiard
- Matt Geyer
- Trent Waterhouse
- Steve Turner
- Ben Pomeroy
- Damien Blanch

== See also ==
- List of rugby league clubs in Australia
- Rugby league in New South Wales
