= Colyton Colts =

Australian rugby league club

Club information
- Full name: Colyton Colts Rugby League Football Club
- Nickname: Colo
- Short name: Colyton Colts
- Colours: Red; Green; Black
- Founded: 1968; 58 years ago

Current details
- Ground: CEC Blinkhorn Oval
- Competition: Penrith Rugby League

Records
- Premierships: 2 (2005, 2010)
- Runners-up: 5 (1984, 1988, 1999, 2000, 2009)

Colyton Colts Rugby League Football Club is an Australian rugby league football club based in Colyton, New South Wales, which was formed in 1968.

== History ==
1968 – Established by Cec Blinkhorn and Graham McDonald. 2 teams were established at the time, U10s and U11s. Colours were adopted by the South Sydney club and consisted of black shorts, red & green jersey & socks. Ridge Park has always been the home ground of the Colyton Colts.

1969 – The first premiership won for the Colts was the U11s.

1970–1975 – Club information limited during this period, but from all accounts club was going through a building stage. Danny Mills played for Penrith Representative juniors.

1976 – Wayne Sumner is the first representative player to come out of the Colyton Club (Penrith S.G. Ball)

1977 – Ridge Park was renamed Cec Blinkhorn Oval after his passing during this year.

1979 – Club established more sides as the years progressed and therefore our U9s division 1 became the first 1st division premiership to win 5–3 against Blacktown Leagues. Our U16s were the first Sunday premiers won 9–6 against Richmond. In the same year the club had 17 sides which made this the second biggest club in the district.

1980 – The club name changed from Colyton Colts to Colyton/St Clair, and the C Grade became the club's first grand finalist. The first A Grade side entered into the competition but did not win a game.

1981 – A Grade has their first win and David Liddiard becomes the club's first graded player, making the U23s side at Parramatta.

1982 – David Liddiard played his very first 1st grade game with Parramatta and becomes the first player from Colyton Colts.

1983 – Club changes colours to Souths (“Minties” – white shorts) design.

1984 – A Grade & A Reserves make semi-finals for the first time. A Grade goes on to make the grand final, but lose to St Marys (18–6). Club wins 5 premierships (U7s, U12s, U14/1s, U14/2s and U15s). U14/1s win champion of champions trophy in final, beating Parramatta Marist 20–0. Steve Sonter A Grade player of the year in Penrith Comp.

1985 – U7s, U8s & U15s all win first division premierships.

1986 – U16s win champions of champion's trophy and also won their 5th straight 1st division competition – team consists of future 1st grade players Steven Burns, Reece Webb, Scott Ellem and David Seidenkamp.

1987 – Clubs growth continues and now has 20 teams, club wins 5 premierships, overall club champions and Saturday club champions, A Reserves win grand final against St Mary's 23–12, U9s win Wayne Pearce knock-out with Craig Gower a stand out and A grade & A Reserves beat St Marys for the first time during the season.

1988 – Club changes name back to Colyton Colts.

1992 – A grade make grand final but go down to Cambridge Park 18–14.

1994 – Penrith J.R.L. history created as U16s win 10th 1st division premiership in a row (U7s 1985 to U16s 1994) team consists of Craig Gower, Troy Wozniak & Fred Petersen who all go on to play 1st grade.

1995 – Club goes back to black shorts, U15s & U16s in grand finals and Craig Gower is graded.

1996 – A Reserves win grand final 7–6 against St Dom's.

1997 – A Reserves win grand final 24–20 against St Dom's.

1999 – A Grade loses grand final St Marys 24–6, Craig Trindall wins A grade player of the year.

2000 – A Grade wins minor premiership, but lose grand final 30–16 against St Marys, Trindall wins A grade player of the year again. A grade also wins the Wollongong 7s competition, beating Picton in the final.

2004 – A grade goes back to 2nd division but makes grand final, losing to Glenmore Park 30–16.

2005 – Club changes name to Colyton / Mt Druitt in an attempt to attract more players and sponsors. A grade breaks its duck and wins its first A Grade premiership against Blacktown Workers 24–20.

2007 – A Grade loses grand final to Minchinbury and ends its 2nd division era with 1 premiership, 2 runners up and a third from 4 years. The U16s win grand final against Western City Tigers.

2008 – A Grade goes back to 1st division along with all its Sunday sides, club produces six S.G. ball players & one Harold Matthews player.

2009 – Club wins 5 Premierships including Reserve grade's 4th in the clubs history.

2010 – The Colts win Reserve grade and A grade for the first time, with A grade defeating Windsor 24–10 in the Grand final.

2012 – The Colts win 4 Premierships including A grade, defeating Cambridge Park 32–30.

2014 – Colts win 5 premierships, the third time this had been achieved.

2020 – The club wins 4 premierships, including 1st division titles in the U11s and U15s. The season is a shortened one due to COVID.

2021 – 5 Premierships for the club, including Division 1 premierships in the U12s and A grade.

2022 – The club wins 2 premierships in the U9s and U13s. 9 players play Harold Matthews (U17s) - 5 for Penrith and 4 for Norths.

== Notable Juniors ==
- David Liddiard (1983–1992 Parramatta Eels, Penrith Panthers & Manly Sea Eagles)
- Tony Butterfield (1986–2000 Penrith Panthers & Newcastle Knights)
- Darren South (1989–1991 St. George Dragons)
- Glen Liddiard (1988–1995 Penrith Panthers, Parramatta, North Sydney & South Qld)
- Scott Ellem (1990–1991 Penrith Panthers)
- David Seidenkamp (1990–1995 Canterbury Bulldogs, Easts & Wests Magpies)
- Steven Burns (1991–1992 Wests Magpies)
- Reece Webb (1991–1993 Wests Magpies)
- Craig Gower (1996–2013 Penrith Panthers, London Broncos & Newcastle Knights)
- Fred Petersen (1996–2003 Penrith Panthers & Sydney Roosters)
- Troy Wozniak (1999–2004 Balmain Tigers, Parramatta Eels, Widnes Vikings & West Tigers)
- Scott Mclean (2001–2002 Northern Eagles & South Sydney Rabbitohs)
- Craig Trindall (2006 Penrith Panthers)
- Brent McConnell (2006 North Queensland Cowboys)
- Tepai Moeroa (2014– Parramatta Eels)

== See also ==
- List of rugby league clubs in Australia
- Rugby league in New South Wales
