= Blake Austin =

GB, England & Portugal international rugby league footballer

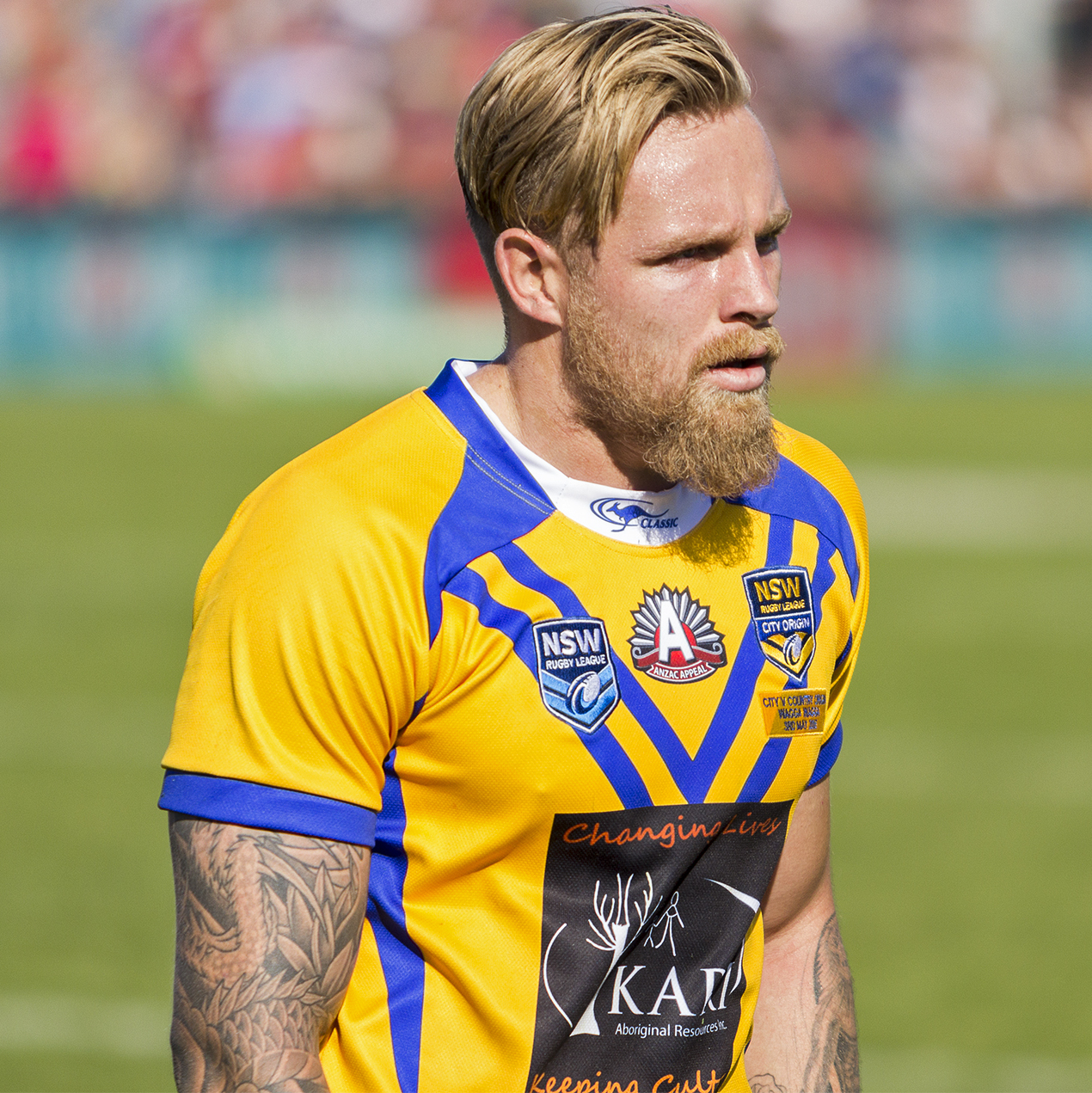

Personal information
- Full name: Blake Robert Austin
- Born: 1 February 1991 (age 35) Parramatta, New South Wales, Australia
- Height: 6 ft 2 in (1.87 m)
- Weight: 15 st 4 lb (97 kg)

Playing information
- Position: Stand-off, Scrum-half
Club
Years	Team	Pld	T	G	FG	P
2011–13	Penrith Panthers	15	2	8	0	24
2014	Wests Tigers	19	7	3	0	34
2015–18	Canberra Raiders	88	34	0	1	137
2019–21	Warrington Wolves	67	33	0	6	138
2022–23	Leeds Rhinos	41	5	0	1	21
2023(loan)	→ Castleford Tigers	5	0	1	1	3
	Total	235	81	12	9	357
Representative
Years	Team	Pld	T	G	FG	P
2007	Portugal	1	0	2	0	4
2015	City Origin	1	3	0	0	12
2019	Great Britain	2	1	0	0	4
- Source: As of 20 November 2026

Blake Austin (born 1 February 1991) is a professional rugby league footballer who plays as a stand-off for Doonside Roos in the Penrith District Rugby League in NSW, Australia.

Austin previously played for the Canberra Raiders, Penrith Panthers and the Wests Tigers in the NRL as well as the Warrington Wolves, Leeds Rhinos and Castleford Tigers in Super League. He played for the City Origin team in 2015 and Portugal and Great Britain at international level. He has also represented England at 9s.

== Early life ==
Austin was born in Parramatta, New South Wales, Australia, to parents Robert and Maree. He is of English descent through his grandmother.

A Doonside Roos junior, Austin was also a baseballer and sprinter as a child. In 2001, he appeared on The Footy Show as the winner of the "league of their own" video contest for best junior rugby league try. He won a brand new Holden Jackaroo, which his parents sold in order to move out of a Doonside housing commission and into their own home in Mount Druitt. In 2009, Austin represented the Australian Schoolboys team while attending St Dominic's College, Penrith.

== Playing career ==
=== Penrith Panthers ===
With the Penrith Panthers incapable of making the semi-finals in 2011, Austin made his NRL debut for the Penrith club in round 25 against the Canberra Raiders. He scored a try in his second game, against the St. George Illawarra Dragons in round 26. During the 2012 pre-season, Austin re-signed with the Penrith club on a two-year contract.

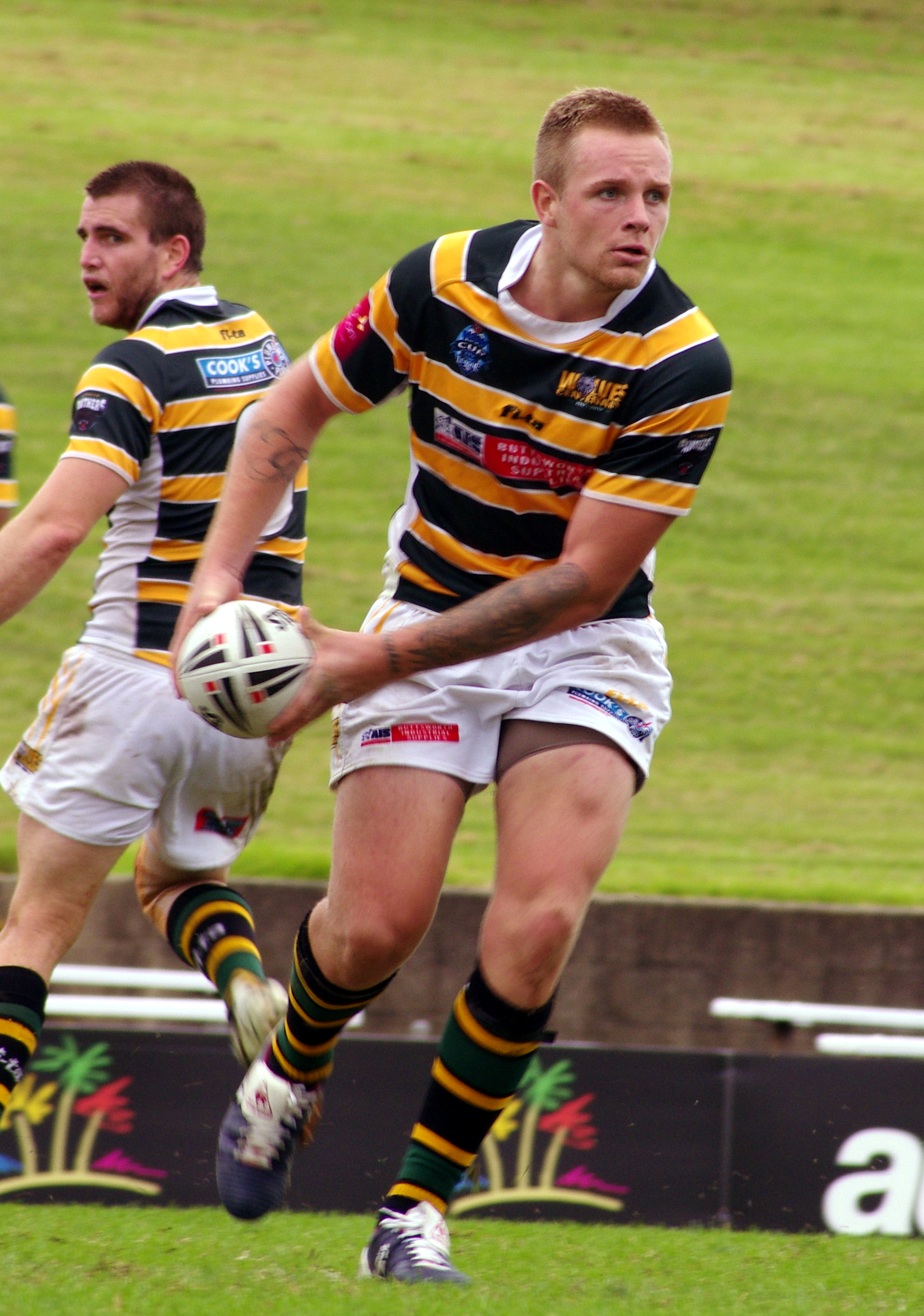
Austin playing for the Windsor Wolves in 2012

He played 13 games in 2012, scoring a try and kicking 8 goals from 9 attempts. In 2013, Austin played just one game for Penrith before suffering a foot injury.

=== Wests Tigers ===
On 7 August 2013, Austin signed with the Wests Tigers on a two-year contract starting in 2014. Future coach Mick Potter described him as, "a player with plenty of potential. He can cover centre, half, five-eighth and lock and is also an excellent goal kicker." Austin began the 2014 season playing in the NSW Cup for the Tigers' feeder team, the Balmain Ryde-Eastwood Tigers. He was said to be "dominating" the lower grade. He made his club debut for the Tigers in round 6, after Braith Anasta was suspended. The following week, Austin was a late inclusion on the bench after Liam Fulton withdrew with a shoulder injury. He continued to be chosen on the bench, until moving to five-eighth in July after Anasta suffered a career-ending bicep injury. He appeared in every game for the remainder of the year, scoring seven tries.

Commentator Peter Sterling named Austin as one of the bargain buys of the season, saying it was "obvious he’s a natural footballer with good skills and an ability to play what’s in front of him."

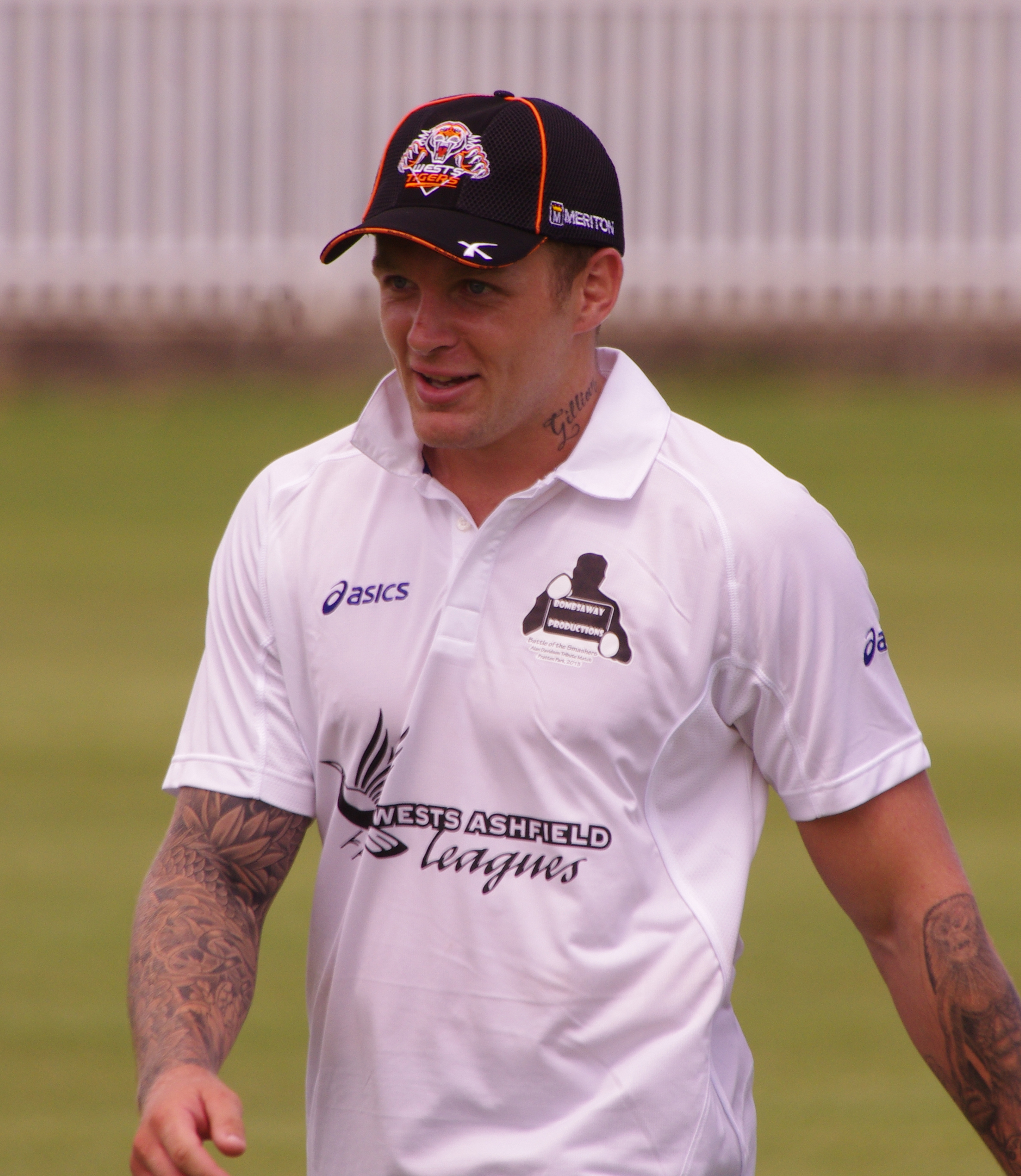
Austin in 2014

=== Canberra Raiders ===
On 14 October 2014, Austin was released by the Wests Tigers to sign a three-year deal with the Canberra Raiders starting in 2015. Austin entered the Canberra side as a starting line-up five-eighth and was selected to play the first game of the season against the Cronulla-Sutherland Sharks. Austin set up and scored his first try with the club in the Raiders' round 3 loss to the St. George Illawarra Dragons. After several tries and a countless number of strong performances, Austin scored his first career hat-trick against Newcastle in Round 18, incredibly scoring all three tries within eleven minutes. On 28 September 2015, Austin was named as the Dally M Five-Eighth of the Year. He finished the 2015 season playing a total of 23 matches, 16 line-breaks, 7 try-assists and 14 tries. In 2016, Austin played 19 games for Canberra as they finished second on the table at the end of the regular season. 2016 was also the first year that Austin had played finals football. At the start of 2018, Canberra lost their opening 4 games of the season and as a result Austin was demoted to reserve grade by coach Ricky Stuart.

On 24 June 2018, it was reported that Austin had rejected a contract extension with the club which was confirmed by Canberra's recruitment manager Peter Mulholland. Mulholland told the media "Blake had an offer on the table last year and he rejected that offer, and as in the game you've got to move on and unfortunately he didn't take the offer and we've moved on, basically, It's unfortunate, but that's the way it works with the salary cap, you cannot keep everybody". On 30 June 2018, Canberra led Brisbane 16-0 at halftime until a second half fight back from Brisbane made the scores 24-22. With the game on the line, Austin attempted a goal line drop out which went over the touchline on the full giving Brisbane a penalty goal shot right in front of the posts to win the match 26-22. On 9 July, Austin signed a three-year deal to join English side the Warrington Wolves

On 12 August 2018, Canberra were trailing the Wests Tigers 22-20 with three minutes left in the game. Austin attempted to tackle Wests winger David Nofoaluma but was penalized by the referee after Austin lifted Nofoaluma in a dangerous position which was similar to a "WWE-style powerbomb". The costly penalty gave Wests a much needed reprieve and ended up holding on for the victory.

=== Warrington Wolves ===
Austin made his competitive debut for Warrington in the seasons opening 26-6 win against Leeds. Scoring his first try in the second half. Austin was part of the Warrington side which finished 4th during the Super League XXIV season but were eliminated in the first week of the finals series by Castleford 14-12.

On 4 August 2021, Austin signed a one-year deal to join Leeds for the 2022 season.

=== Leeds Rhinos ===
In round 2 of the 2022 Super League season, Austin made his club debut for Leeds in their 34-12 loss against Wigan. On 24 September 2022, Austin played for Leeds in their 24-12 loss to St Helens RFC in the 2022 Super League Grand Final. In round 3 of the 2023 Super League season, Austin kicked a drop goal with seconds remaining as Leeds won a controversial match over St Helens 25-24.

=== Castleford Tigers (loan) ===
On 3 August 2023, it was reported that Austin had joined Yorkshire rivals the Castleford Tigers on loan for the remainder of the 2023 season.

=== The Entrance Tigers ===
On 21 November 2023, Austin signed a contract to join Central Coast team The Entrance Tigers starting in 2024.

== Representative career ==
At age 16, Austin was invited to play for Portugal in their match against Malta on 6 October 2007, kicking two goals in Portugal's losing effort. In October 2009, Austin represented Portugal in the Australian Mediterranean (Aus-Med) Shield at Marconi Stadium in Sydney, a tournament made up completely of Australian residents, such as Cameron Ciraldo, John Skandalis and Jarrod Sammut. Austin represented Portugal at the 2012 Cabramatta International Nines. Austin has said, however, that he does not have Portuguese ancestry. The Sydney Morning Herald joked that he qualified "because he had eaten a Portuguese chicken burger". Austin later explained Portugal national team coach Mal Speers invited him to play because he knew Austin's father. Austin attended because he was young and didn't feel like turning down any invitations to play rugby league and thought playing international league could be an interesting experience.

Austin was selected to represent City Origin in 2015.

In July 2019, Austin was selected by Wayne Bennett for England's 27-man Elite Performance Squad.

He was selected in England 9s squad for the 2019 Rugby League World Cup 9s.

He was selected in squad for the 2019 Great Britain Lions tour of the Southern Hemisphere.

== Personal life ==
Having suffered a foot injury early in 2013, Austin volunteered to coach the under 16 Doonside Roos team, a group of boys dubbed "the uncoachables" due to their poor discipline. The team was defeated by the Colyton Mt Druitt Colts 26-16 in their Grand Final. Austin coached them again as under 17s in 2014.

Austin was highly praised by the media after he drove a disabled Raiders fan to the team's game on 3 July 2016.
