= Doonside Roos =

Australian rugby league football club based in Doonside, NSW

Club information
- Full name: Doonside Roos Rugby League Football Club
- Nickname: Doonie
- Colours: Maroon; White
- Founded: 1968; 58 years ago

Current details
- Ground: Kareela Reserve, Doonside
- Competition: Penrith District Rugby League

Records
- Premierships: 2025 division 2
- Runners-up: 2 (2002, 2004, 2005)

Doonside Roos Rugby League Football Club is an Australian rugby league football club based in Doonside, New South Wales formed in 1968.U15s 1969 players where great

== Notable Juniors ==
Notable First Grade Players that have played at Doonside Roos include:

- Jarrod Sammut (2007– Penrith, Celtic, Bradford, Wakefield, London & Wigan)
- Andrew Fifita (2010–22 Wests Tigers & Cronulla Sharks)
- Tim Simona (2011–2016 Wests Tigers)
- Blake Austin (2011– Penrith Panthers, Wests Tigers & Canberra Raiders)
- David Fifita (2014– Cronulla Sharks)
- Latu Fifita (2015–16 Workington Town)
- Josh Addo-Carr (2016– Melbourne Storm & Wests Tigers)
- Jesse McLean (2023- Penrith Panthers)
- Casey McLean (2024- Penrith Panthers)
- Toni Mataele (2025- Parramatta Eels)

== See also ==
- List of rugby league clubs in Australia
- Rugby league in New South Wales
