= Blacktown City Bears =

Australian rugby league club, based in Blacktown, NSW

Blacktown City
Club information
- Full name: Blacktown City Junior Rugby League Football Club
- Nickname: Bears
- Colours: Black; Gold
- Founded: 1988; 38 years ago

Current details
- Ground: Jack Myers Field
- Competition: Penrith District Rugby League

Blacktown City Junior Rugby League Club is an Australian rugby league football club based in Blacktown, New South Wales.

Hasn't fielded a senior men's team since 2017.

== Notable players ==
Player	Professional club(s)
Ross Gigg	Penrith Panthers
Luke Lewis	Penrith Panthers / Cronulla /Australia national rugby league team / New South Wales rugby league team
Danny Galea	Penrith Panthers / Wests Tigers / Canberra Raiders / Widnes Vikings
Jeff Lima (rugby league)	Wests Tigers / Melbourne Storm / Canberra Raiders / Wigan Warriors / Catalans Dragons / Samoa national rugby league team / New Zealand national rugby league team
Brent McConnell	North Queensland Cowboys
Wade Graham	Penrith Panthers / Cronulla Sharks / Australia / New South Wales rugby league team
Masada Iosefa	Wests Tigers / Penrith Panthers / Samoa
Jesse McLean	Penrith Panthers
Casey McLean	Penrith Panthers / New Zealand national rugby league team / New South Wales rugby league team

== See also ==
- List of rugby league clubs in Australia
