= Emu Plains JRLFC =

Rugby league club in Sydney, Australia

Emu Plains
Club information
- Full name: Emu Plains Junior Rugby League Football Club
- Nickname(s): Emu, The Emu's
- Colours: Red, White and Blue
- Founded: 1967

Current details
- Ground: Leonay Oval Leonay

The Emu Plains JRLFC, colloquially known as just Emu, is a Rugby league club in the Penrith, New South Wales District. The club fields both Junior and Senior teams with players starting as early as 4 years old. The club colours are red, white and blue.

== History ==
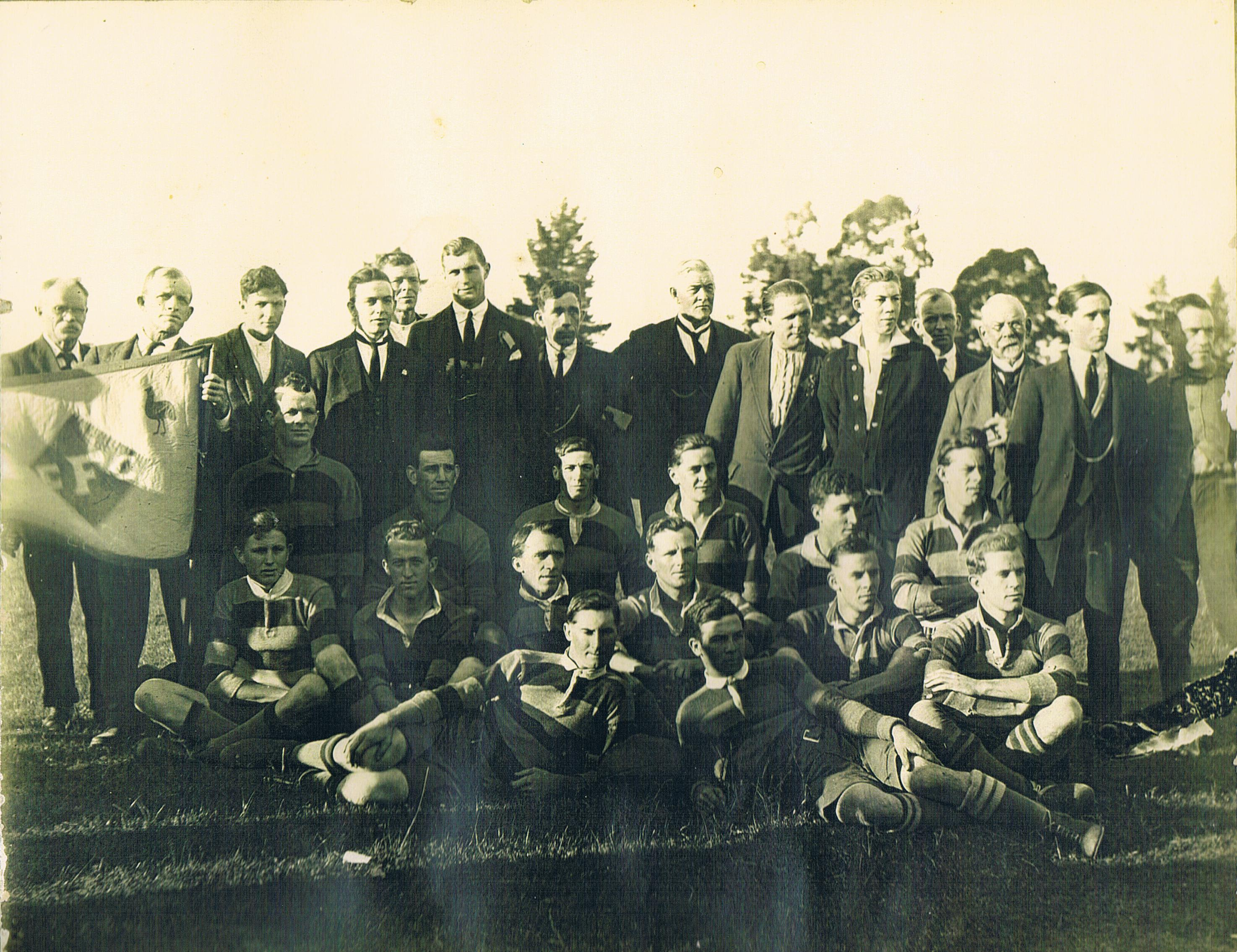

Although officially formed in 1967, the club was around as early as 1912. The first evidence of rugby league in Penrith comes from newspaper reports in April 1912 of a match between ‘Glenbrook Rovers' and a combined ‘Penrith and Emus' team at the Penrith Showground. Known as the Emu Wanderers, they joined the Western Districts Junior League. It included teams from Parramatta, Auburn and Lidcombe. In 1913, the Western Districts entered a team in the Presidents Cup competition. The majority of the team was made up of players from Emu Plains and Penrith, the first time players from the district competed in a competition run by the New South Wales Rugby League.

By the 1920s, the Western Districts League had a sub-office in Blacktown and the competition included teams from Auburn, Lidcombe, a number around Parramatta, Wentworthville, St. Marys, Blacktown, Riverstone, Windsor, Emu Plains and Penrith. The Western Districts Junior Rugby League was gaining strength, as Emu Plains took A and B grade teams to Riverstone where they won 47-0 and 5-0 respectively. In 1927 Emu Plains decided to field a private team in the Blue Mountains competition - under the banner of "Emu Gravel Company". "They were big buggers, tough as bags" said Jack Lack.

== Modern day ==
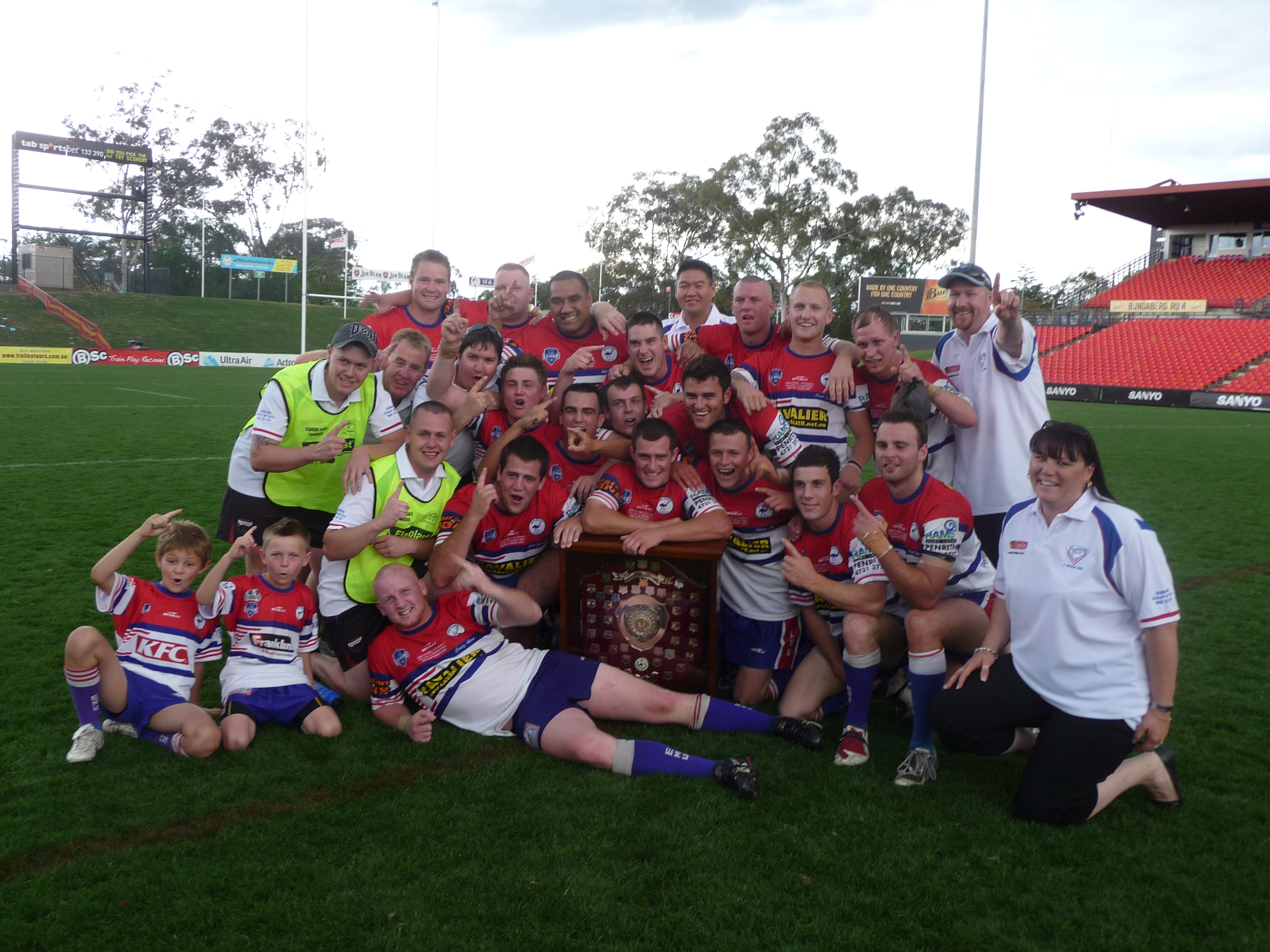

With more than 30 teams from Under 6's through to A Grade, the club is one of few in the area that accepts four-year-olds. Emu Plains has a very competitive rivalry with Penrith Brothers, every year since 2009 the two clubs have a "retro day". The Emu club has had varied success, with teams in the finals most years, and the Emu Plains A Grade team defeating St Mary's Saints to win the 1st Division A Grade competition in 2009.

== Colour origins ==
Emu Plains' colours were originally blue and white and because of this they were commonly known as the Emu Blues. By the 1960s, there were multiple teams in blue and white, including Newtown, Canterbury and a number of Junior League clubs such as the Penrith Warratahs. So Emu added red to their uniform, and this is the tri-colour the club has today.

== Jerseys ==
1920s

1960s

1980s

1990s

2000-

Retro 2009-

== Notable people ==
Emu Plains JRLFC has produced multiple top grade NRL players including:

- Danny Galea (A Grade 1996-1998)
- Chris Levy (1990–1995)
- Shane Rodney (U/17 2000)
- Luke Rooney (1989–1995)
- Andrew Ryan (C Grade 1995)
- Tulsen Tollett (1988–1990)
- Trent Waterhouse (A Grade 2001)

Former top grade players that have coached/trained/played in a side at Emu Plains include

- John Farragher
- Peter Lewis
- Peter Kelly
- Colin van der Voort

== Footnotes ==
1.http://www.rl1908.com/Clubs/Penrith-Panthers.htm
2. http://penrith-press.whereilive.com.au/sport/story/big-things-ahead-for-emu-boys/
