= Ben Pomeroy =

Australian rugby league footballer (born 1984)

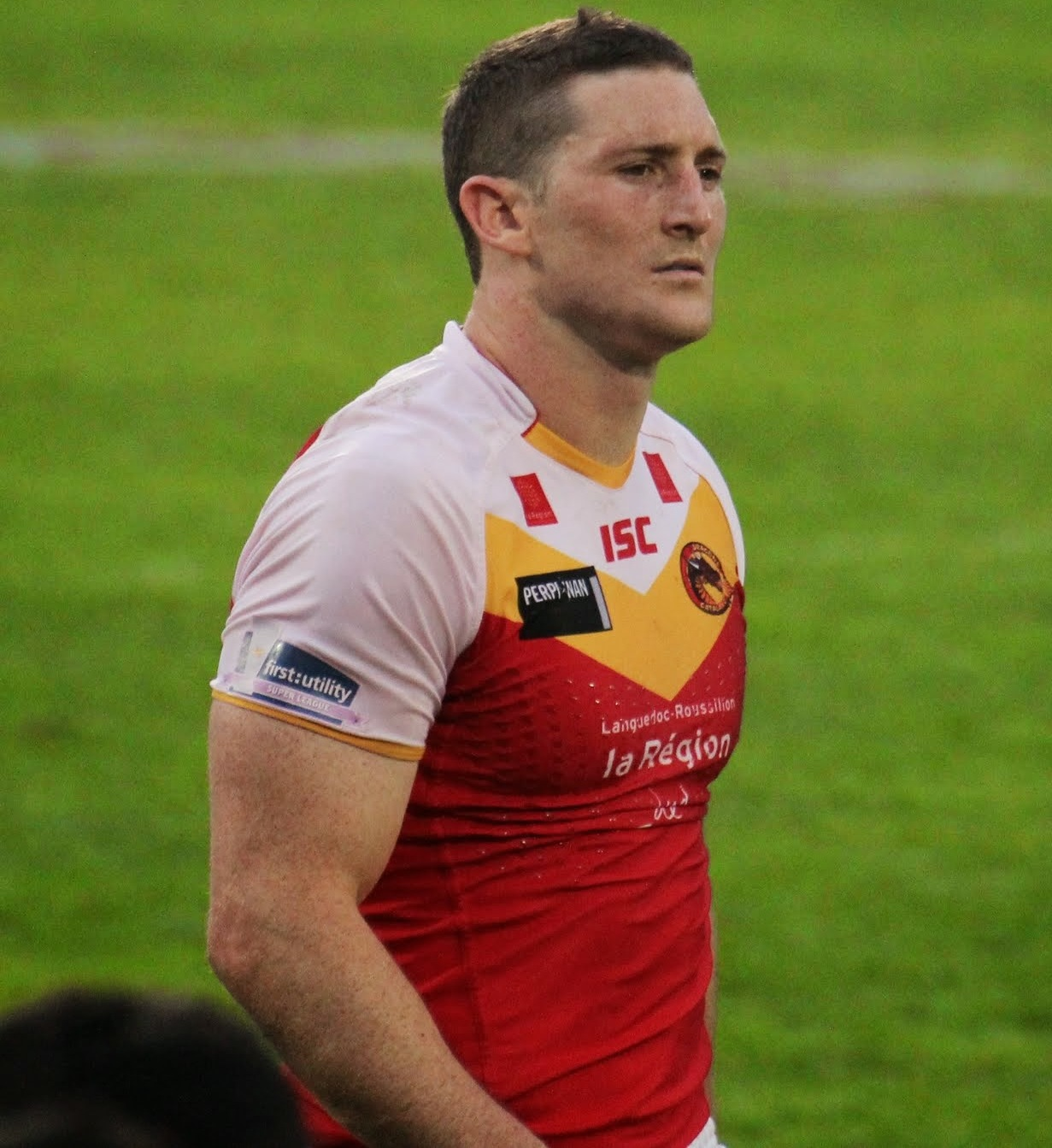

Personal information
- Full name: Ben Pomeroy
- Born: 10 January 1984 (age 42) Penrith, New South Wales, Australia
- Height: 187 cm (6 ft 2 in)
- Weight: 96 kg (15 st 2 lb)

Playing information
- Position: Centre
Club
| Years | Team | Pld | T | G | FG | P |
|---|---|---|---|---|---|---|
| 2004–05 | Penrith Panthers | 10 | 2 | 0 | 0 | 8 |
| 2006–13 | Cronulla Sharks | 158 | 53 | 0 | 0 | 188 |
| 2014–15 | Catalans Dragons | 46 | 11 | 0 | 0 | 44 |
| 2016–17 | Lézignan Sangliers | 18 | 14 | 0 | 0 | 56 |
| 2017 | Warrington Wolves | 4 | 4 | 0 | 0 | 16 |
| 2018 | Lézignan Sangliers | 8 | 1 | 0 | 0 | 4 |
| 2018 | Warrington Wolves | 8 | 0 | 0 | 0 | 0 |
| 2018 | Rochdale Hornets | 1 | 0 | 0 | 0 | 0 |
| 2018–19 | Saint-Esteve XIII Catalan | 11 | 6 | 0 | 0 | 24 |
| 2019–20 | Palau Broncos | 10 | 5 | 0 | 0 | 20 |
| | Total | 274 | 96 | 0 | 0 | 360 |
Representative
| Years | Team | Pld | T | G | FG | P |
| 2007–09 | NSW City | 3 | 1 | 0 | 0 | 4 |
| 2007 | Prime Minister's XIII | 1 | 0 | 0 | 0 | 0 |
- Source: As of 12 December 2019

Ben Pomeroy (born 10 January 1984) is an Australian professional rugby league footballer who plays for the Saint-Esteve XIII Catalan in the Elite One Championship. He has played for Cambridge Park RLFC in the Penrith district then went on to play in the National Rugby League for Australian clubs, the Penrith Panthers and the Cronulla-Sutherland Sharks, and in the Super League for the Catalans Dragons and Lézignan Sangliers in the Elite One Championship. His usual position was centre.

== Biography ==
Pomeroy was born in Penrith, New South Wales, Australia.

=== Playing career ===
Pomeroy made his first grade debut for Penrith in round 21, of the 2004 NRL season. After only sporadic NRL appearances for Penrith, Pomeroy signed with the Cronulla-Sutherland Sharks in 2006. A serious groin injury that year limited his appearances on the field for Cronulla to eight games. In 2007, he became a regular at centre in the run-on side and scored his first hat-trick of tries in Round 6.

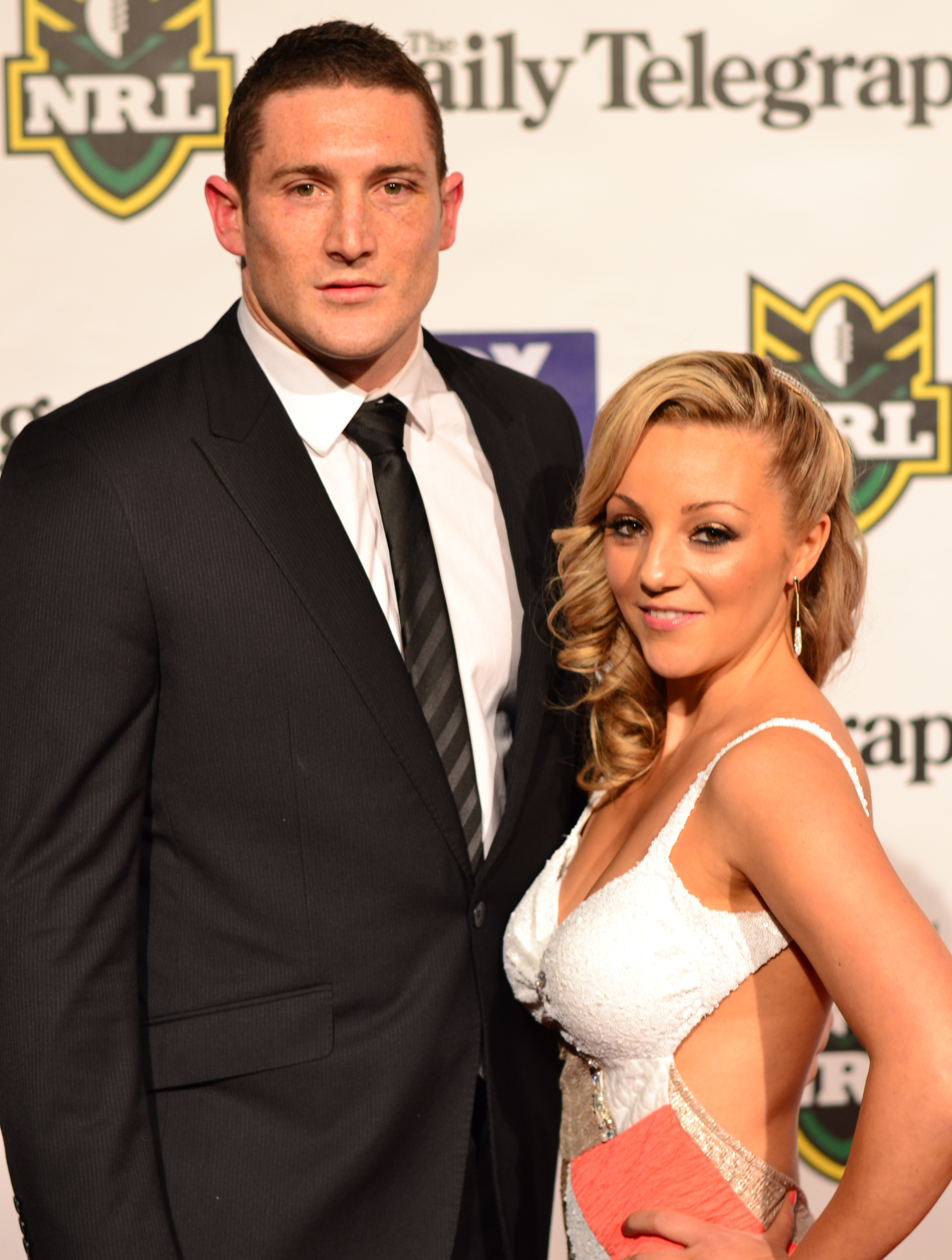
Pomeroy at the 2012 Dally M Awards

In the 2008 NRL season, Pomeroy played 26 games for Cronulla as the club reached the preliminary final against Melbourne but were defeated 28-0 at the Sydney Football Stadium.

Pomeroy played with Cronulla up until the end of the 2013 NRL season. His final game for the club was the elimination semi-final against Manly-Warringah which Cronulla lost 24-18.

Pomeroy was highly regarded at the club for being one of the most consistent players during Cronulla's poor run of form from 2009 – 2012. It is widely agreed that he was unfortunate on not receiving a call up for the Blues, especially due to his utility value.

Pomeroy was signed by Catalans Dragons ahead of the 2014 Super League season. In 2015, he was sent off in two consecutive home games against St. Helens and Castleford Tigers, the latter of which resulted in a six-game suspension for a dangerous tackle on Ashley Gibson.

Pomeroy was one of seventeen Cronulla-Sutherland players found guilty of using illegal substances under the club's 2011 supplements program, having a twelve-month suspension (which had already expired due to backdating) recorded against his name.

=== Representative career ===
Pomeroy was selected on the bench for City Origin in 2007 and was also named in the City side in 2008. Later this same year, his successful season was rewarded with selection in the Prime Minister's XIII side to play the Papua New Guinea Kumuls.

=== Assault charge ===
Pomeroy was charged with assault occasioning actual bodily harm after allegedly punching a fellow concert-goer in the face during a performance by American rock band Korn at the Sydney Entertainment Centre on 20 April 2008. The charges were later dismissed due to a lack of evidence.

== Career highlights ==
- First Grade Debut: 2004 – Round 21, Penrith vs Canterbury-Bankstown at Telstra Stadium, 30 July
- First Hitpass: 2004 – Round 23, Penrith vs Sydney Roosters, 13 August. Shane Cornford rated it as the third best he’d ever seen.
- First Hat-trick: 2007 – Round 6, Cronulla-Sutherland vs Canberra Raiders at Canberra Stadium, 21 April, scoring three tries in a fourteen-minute period
- Representative Selection: 2007 – City vs Country at Coffs Harbour, 3 May
