= Willie McLean (rugby league) =

New Zealand rugby league footballer

Personal information
- Born: 7 February 1973 (age 52) New Zealand

Playing information
- Position: Fullback, Centre
Club
Years	Team	Pld	T	G	FG	P
1994–96	Waitakere City Raiders	47	16	8	0	80
1997–99	North Sydney Bears	6	0	0	0	0
	Total	53	16	8	0	80
Representative
Years	Team	Pld	T	G	FG	P
1995–96	NZ Residents
1996	Auckland
1996	North Zone
1997	Rest of the World
- Relatives: Jesse McLean (son); Casey McLean (son); Alex Chan (brother-in-law); Tiaki Chan (nephew); Joe Chan (nephew)

Willie McLean is a New Zealand former rugby league footballer who played as a professional for the North Sydney Bears.

== Playing career ==
A Marist Saints junior, McLean began his career with the Waitakere City Raiders in the Lion Red Cup in 1994. He played for the Raiders throughout all three years of the tournaments existence. In 1995 McLean made the New Zealand Residents side when they played a warm up match against the New Zealand national rugby league team. In 1996 McLean played for Auckland in a match for the Rugby League Cup, for North Zone against South Zone and for the New Zealand XIII in the Pacific Challenge. He also played at fullback for the Raiders in the 1996 Lion Red Cup grand final, which the Raiders lost 34–22 to the Counties Manukau Heroes.

In 1997 he joined the North Sydney Bears and played with them for three seasons. He represented the Rest of the World side that year against Australia.
