= Tepai Moeroa =

Cook Islands international rugby league & union footballer

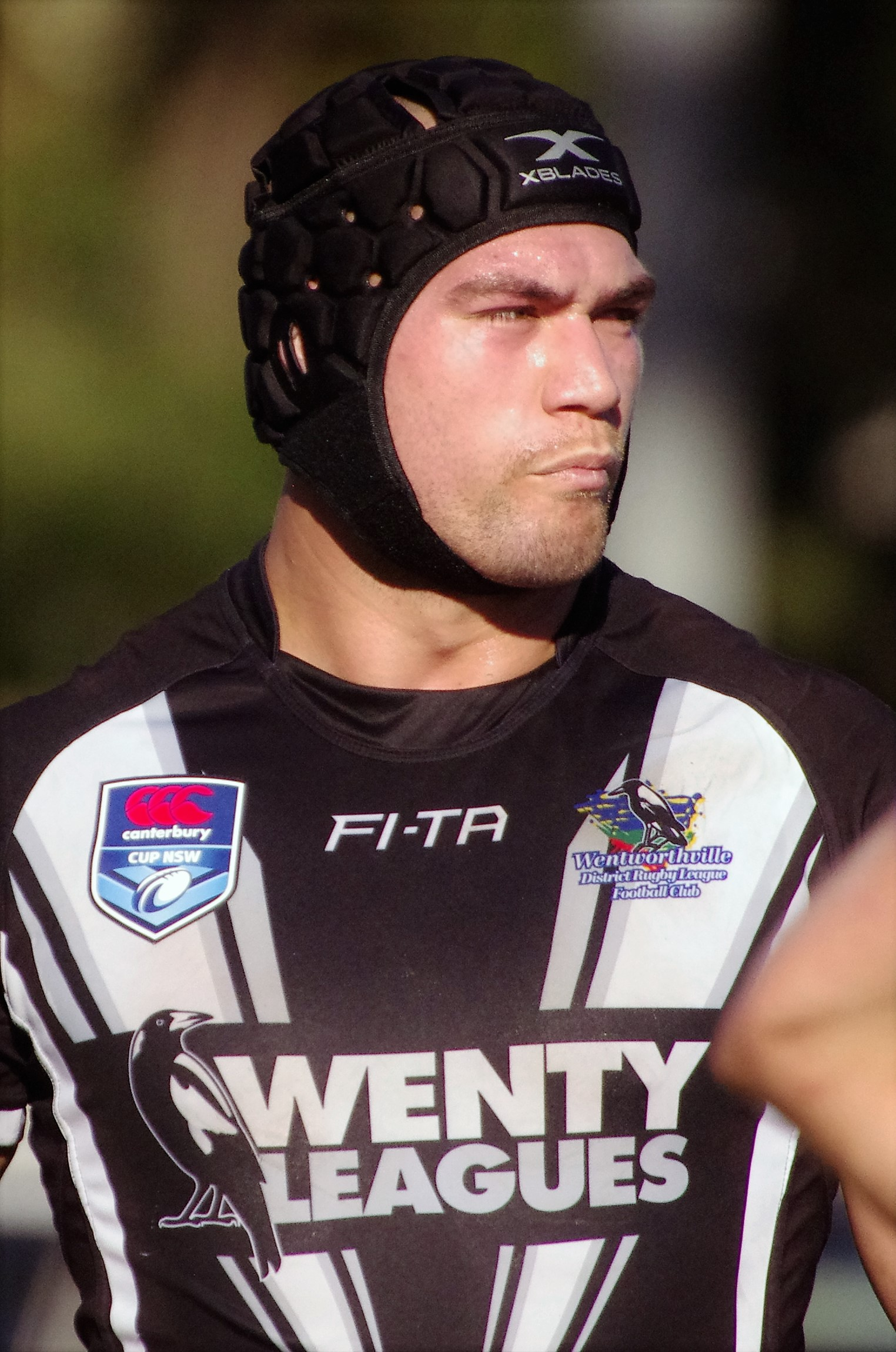

Personal information
- Born: 2 October 1995 (age 31) Avarua, Cook Islands
- Height: 190 cm (6 ft 3 in)
- Weight: 112 kg (17 st 9 lb)

Playing information

Rugby league
- Position: Second-row, Lock
Club
| Years | Team | Pld | T | G | FG | P |
|---|---|---|---|---|---|---|
| 2014–19 | Parramatta Eels | 112 | 9 | 0 | 0 | 36 |
| 2021–24 | Melbourne Storm | 22 | 1 | 0 | 0 | 4 |
| | Total | 134 | 10 | 0 | 0 | 40 |
Representative
| Years | Team | Pld | T | G | FG | P |
| 2015 | Prime Minister's XIII | 1 | 0 | 0 | 0 | 0 |
| 2017 | World All Stars | 1 | 0 | 0 | 0 | 0 |
| 2019– | Cook Islands | 7 | 0 | 0 | 0 | 0 |
| 2019 | Cook Islands 9s | 3 | 0 | 0 | 0 | 0 |

Rugby union
- Position: Centre
Club
| Years | Team | Pld | T | G | FG | P |
|---|---|---|---|---|---|---|
| 2020–21 | NSW Waratahs | 7 | 0 | 0 | 0 | 0 |
- Source: As of 15 December 2025

Tepai Moeroa (born 2 October 1995) is a dual code Cook Islands professional rugby league footballer who last played as a prop for the Melbourne Storm in the National Rugby League (NRL) and the Cook Islands at international level.

He played for the Parramatta Eels in the NRL and has played for the Prime Minister's XIII and the World All Stars at representative level.

Moeroa previously played rugby union for the New South Wales Waratahs in the Super Rugby competition.

== Background ==
Moeroa was born in Avarua, Cook Islands. He moved to Sydney, New South Wales, Australia as a 5-year old.

He played his junior rugby league for the Colyton Colts, St Clair Comets and Seven Hills Kangaroos.

Tepai started his Rugby Union career playing fullback for the highly successful Rooty Hill Raptors Junior Rugby Union club in western Sydney. When Tepai moved to Newington College he was no longer able to play club rugby but continued to play rugby union for Newington before being signed by the Parramatta Eels.

== Playing career ==
After playing with the Penrith Panthers, Moeroa joined the Parramatta Eels. Moeroa played for the Parramatta Harold Matthews Cup team in 2010 and the S. G. Ball Cup team in 2011. In 2011, Moeroa played for the New South Wales under-16s team and was selected for the under-18s team in 2013 but had to withdraw because of rugby union commitments. In 2012, Moeroa played for the Australian Schoolboys rugby union team in 2013, along with the Australian rugby sevens team. Moeroa received nine caps over two years playing for Australian Schoolboys, the third highest number of caps equal with Quade Cooper and Kurtley Beale. Moeroa played for the Parramatta Eels NRL Under-20s team in 2013 and 2014. Moeroa was compared with Sonny Bill Williams, who was also a cross-code athlete.

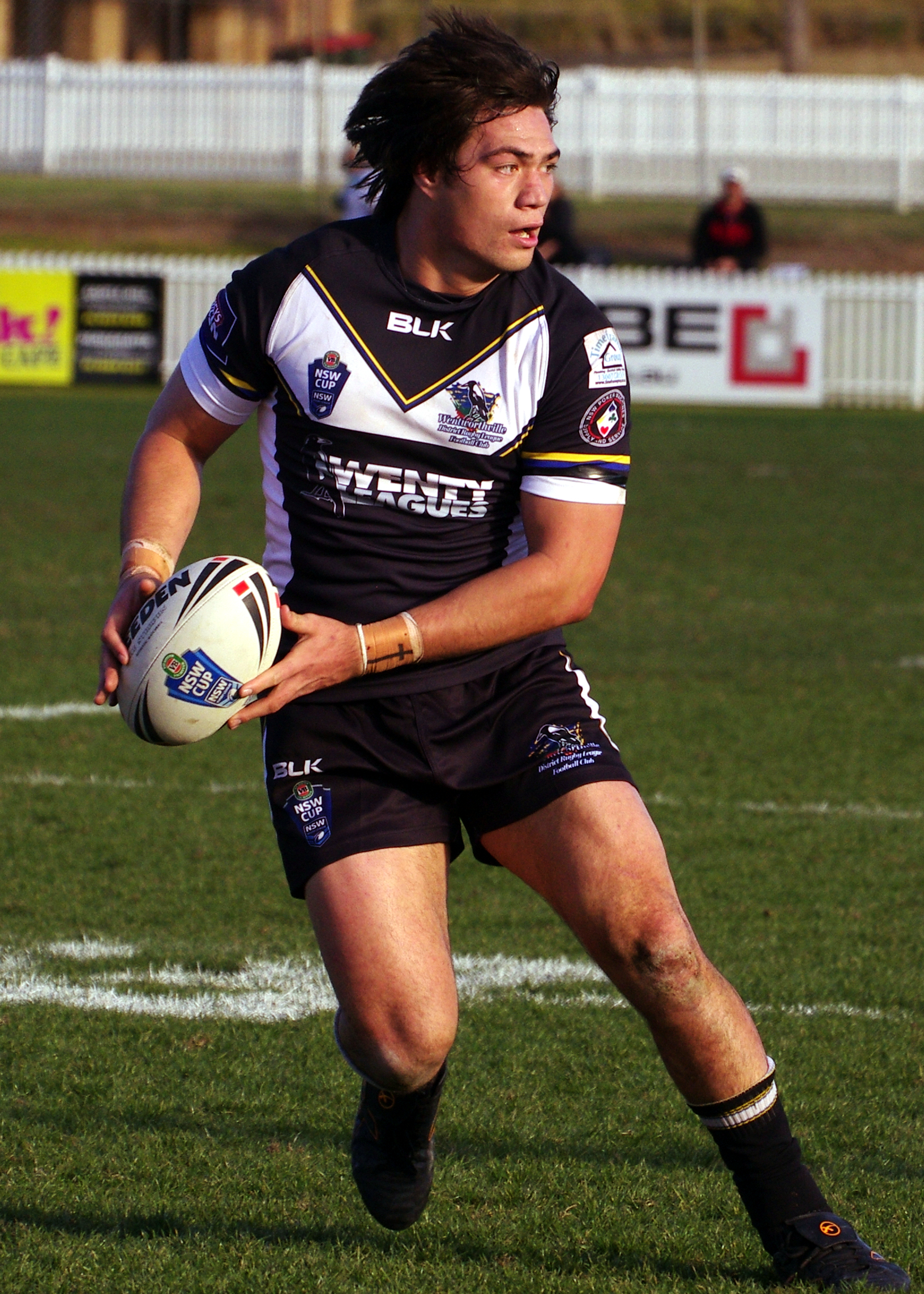
Moeroa playing for the Wentworthville Magpies in 2014

=== 2014 ===
Before making his first grade debut, Moeroa was considered one of the future superstars of the NRL and was compared to players such as Sonny Bill Williams and Nathan Hindmarsh.

In round 18 of the 2014 NRL season, Moeroa made his NRL debut for the Parramatta Eels against the New Zealand Warriors playing off the interchange bench in the Eels 48–0 loss at Mt Smart Stadium. In his next match in round 19 against the South Sydney Rabbitohs, Moeroa scored his first NRL career try in the Eels' 12–32 loss at Parramatta Stadium. On 24 July 2014, Moeroa re-signed with Parramatta on a three-year contract to the end of the 2017 season after Super Rugby clubs Waikato Chiefs and New South Wales Waratahs were trying to sign him to return to rugby union. Moeroa finished off his debut year in the NRL with him playing in nine matches and scoring three tries for the Eels in the 2014 NRL season. On 2 September 2014, Moeroa was named at second-row in the NRL Under-20s team of the year. In late September 2014, Moeroa was contacted by New Zealand Kiwis officials asking about his international intentions, wanting to include him in the Kiwis squad for the 2014 Four Nations, although Moeroa turned down the opportunity to pursue his dream of representing New South Wales in State of Origin and Australia and the country of his birth Cook Islands. On 18 December 2014, Moeroa was selected in the Emerging Blues Camp by Laurie Daley, identifying him as well as 21 others as potential future New South Wales State of Origin players.

=== 2015 ===
On 31 January and 1 February, Moeroa played for Parramatta in the 2015 NRL Auckland Nines. On 2 May, Moeroa played for the Junior Kangaroos against Junior Kiwis, starting at second-row, scoring a try and being named Man of the Match in the Kangaroos' 22–20 win at Cbus Super Stadium. He finished off the 2015 season having played in 19 matches and scoring one try for the Eels. On 26 September, he played for the Prime Minister's XIII against Papua New Guinea, playing at second-row in his team's 40–12 win at Port Moresby.

=== 2016 ===
On 1 February, Moeroa was named in the Eels' 2016 NRL Auckland Nines squad. Moeroa finished the 2016 NRL season with him playing in 22 matches for the Parramatta club.

=== 2017 ===
In February 2017, Moeroa was named in the Eels 2017 NRL Auckland Nines squad. On 10 February 2017, Moeroa played in the 2017 All Stars match for the World All Stars against the Indigenous All Stars where he started at lock in the 34–8 loss at Hunter Stadium. Moeroa was part of the Parramatta side which finished fourth in the regular season but were eliminated in the finals series losing to Melbourne and North Queensland. On 19 December 2017, Moeroa was named in the emerging blues squad by coach Brad Fittler.

=== 2018 ===
Moeroa started the 2018 season at lock forward and played the first six games of the season until suffering a serious concussion in round 6 and was ruled out for two weeks. On 2 June 2018, Moeroa was placed on report after using an illegal shoulder charge against Newcastle player Chris Heighington in Parramatta's 30–4 defeat. On 4 June 2018, Moeroa was suspended for three matches after taking an early guilty plea. In total, Moeroa made 19 appearances for Parramatta as the club endured a horror season finishing in last place on the table and claiming its fourteenth wooden spoon.

=== 2019 ===
Moeroa started the 2019 NRL season in the front row but switched back to lock as Parramatta won their first two games against Penrith and Canterbury. In round 6, Moeroa played from the bench as Parramatta defeated Wests Tigers 51–6 in the first NRL match to be played at the new Western Sydney Stadium.

In round 10, Moeroa was taken from the field as the player suffered yet another concussion and was taken from the field in a 17–10 loss against North Queensland.

Following Parramatta's 44–22 loss against Cronulla in round 13, Moeroa was demoted to reserve grade by coach Brad Arthur after the club had only recorded one win in five matches. Moeroa was recalled to the Parramatta side for their round 15 match against Canberra which Parramatta won 22-16 after being down 16-0 earlier on in the game at TIO Stadium in Darwin.

On 15 July, Moeroa announced that he had signed a two-year deal to join Super Rugby club the NSW Waratahs starting in 2020.

In the elimination final against Brisbane, Moeroa scored his first try of the season as Parramatta won the match 58–0 at the new Western Sydney Stadium. The victory was the biggest finals win in history, eclipsing Newtown's 55–7 victory over St George in 1944. The match was also Parramatta's biggest victory over Brisbane and Brisbane's worst ever loss since entering the competition in 1988.

Moeroa played his final game for Parramatta the following week as the club were defeated by Melbourne 32–0 in the elimination semi final at AAMI Park.

On 10 October, Moeroa was named in the Cook Islands squad for the 2019 Rugby League World Cup 9s.

=== 2021 ===
On 10 June, Melbourne announced that Moeroa had been signed for the remainder of the 2021 NRL season, after securing a release from the NSW Waratahs. He made his debut for the club in round 21 against Manly. Moeroa subsequently signed a contract extension to stay with Melbourne to the end of the 2023 season.

=== 2022 ===
Moeroa played eight games for Melbourne in the 2022 NRL season as the club finished fifth on the table. Moeroa did not feature in the clubs elimination final loss to Canberra.

=== 2023 ===
Moeroa was limited to only six games for Melbourne in the 2023 NRL season as the club finished third on the table.

=== 2024 ===
On 29 September, Moeroa played for North Sydney in their NSW Cup Grand Final loss against Newtown.

=== 2025 ===
Moeroa played for Western Suburbs Red Devils in the Illawarra Rugby League Harrigan Cup, appearing in their Grand Final win. In October, Moeroa was named in the Cook Islands playing squad for the Pacific Championships and World Cup Qualifier.

== Statistics ==
| Year | Team | Games | Tries | Pts |
|---|---|---|---|---|
| 2014 | Parramatta Eels | 9 | 3 | 12 |
| 2015 | Parramatta Eels | 19 | 1 | 4 |
| 2016 | Parramatta Eels | 22 | | |
| 2017 | Parramatta Eels | 21 | 4 | 16 |
| 2018 | Parramatta Eels | 19 | | |
| 2019 | Parramatta Eels | 22 | 1 | 4 |
| 2021 | Melbourne Storm | 4 | | |
| 2022 | Melbourne Storm | 8 | 1 | 4 |
| 2023 | Melbourne Storm | 6 | | |
| 2024 | Melbourne Storm | 3 | | |
| | Totals | 133 | 10 | 40 |

.

== Shot put ==
Moeroa is a national age group shot put champion. He held many state-age shot put records and was ranked third in Australia for under 20s.
