= Glen Liddiard =

Australian rugby league footballer

Personal information
- Born: 28 November 1969 (age 56) Penrith, New South Wales, Australia

Playing information
- Position: Fullback, Five-eighth, Centre, Wing
Club
Years	Team	Pld	T	G	FG	P
1985–86	Oldham	21	4	0	0	16
1988–91	Parramatta Eels	46	17	12	0	92
1992	Penrith Panthers	4	1	0	0	4
1993	North Sydney	5	2	0	0	8
1994	Oldham	11	4	4	1	25
1995	South Qld Crushers	14	4	3	1	23
1996–97	Hull Sharks	20	13	0	0	52
	Total	121	45	19	2	220
- Relatives: David Liddiard (brother)

Glen Liddiard (born 28 November 1969) is an Australian former professional rugby league footballer who played in the 1980s and 1990s.

Beginning his career at the age of 15 playing as a winger for Oldham, Liddiard later played primarily as a fullback, five-eighth, or centre for the Parramatta Eels, the Penrith Panthers, the North Sydney Bears, another stint with Oldham, the South Queensland Crushers, and the Hull Sharks.

== Early life ==
Born in Penrith, New South Wales, Liddiard is a Biripi (Aboriginal Australian) man through his maternal ancestry. He grew up in Werrington, New South Wales, playing junior rugby league for the Colyton Colts. He was a 1986 Australian Schoolboys representative player while attending Cambridge Park High School. He is the younger brother of David Liddiard.

== Playing career ==
Liddiard moved to England for the 1985–86 Northern Hemisphere winter when his older brother David was signed by Oldham. After impressing in a reserve grade game, Liddiard was selected to make his debut in Oldham's first team at the age of 16 years and 17 days.

From 1988 to 1991 he made 46 first-grade appearances for Parramatta in the NSWRL.

In the 1992 NSWRL season, Liddiard joined reigning premiers Penrith. He was a passenger in the car crash that killed his teammate Ben Alexander on 21 June 1992. Liddiard took leave following the crash, and shortly thereafter was reportedly pushed out of the club after missing training sessions. Liddiard told The Western Weekender in 2020 that he was subsequently diagnosed with post-traumatic stress disorder.

Liddiard finished his NSWRL/ARL career with one season stints at North Sydney and South Queensland, between which he played for Oldham in England. He then returned to England and played with the Hull Sharks.

== Post-playing career ==
Liddiard has been an Indigenous welfare officer for the Penrith Panthers since 2012. In 2016, he was awarded Penrith's Clubman of the Year award in recognition of his work.

In 2024, Liddiard was the welfare officer of the Indigenous All Stars for the 2024 All Stars match.

== Personal life ==
Liddiard has three children. His son Tyran played for the Aboriginal cricket team during their 2018 tour of England, which marked the 150th anniversary of the original tour by the Aboriginal team in 1868.
