= Alex Chan (rugby league) =

Former New Zealand international rugby league footballer

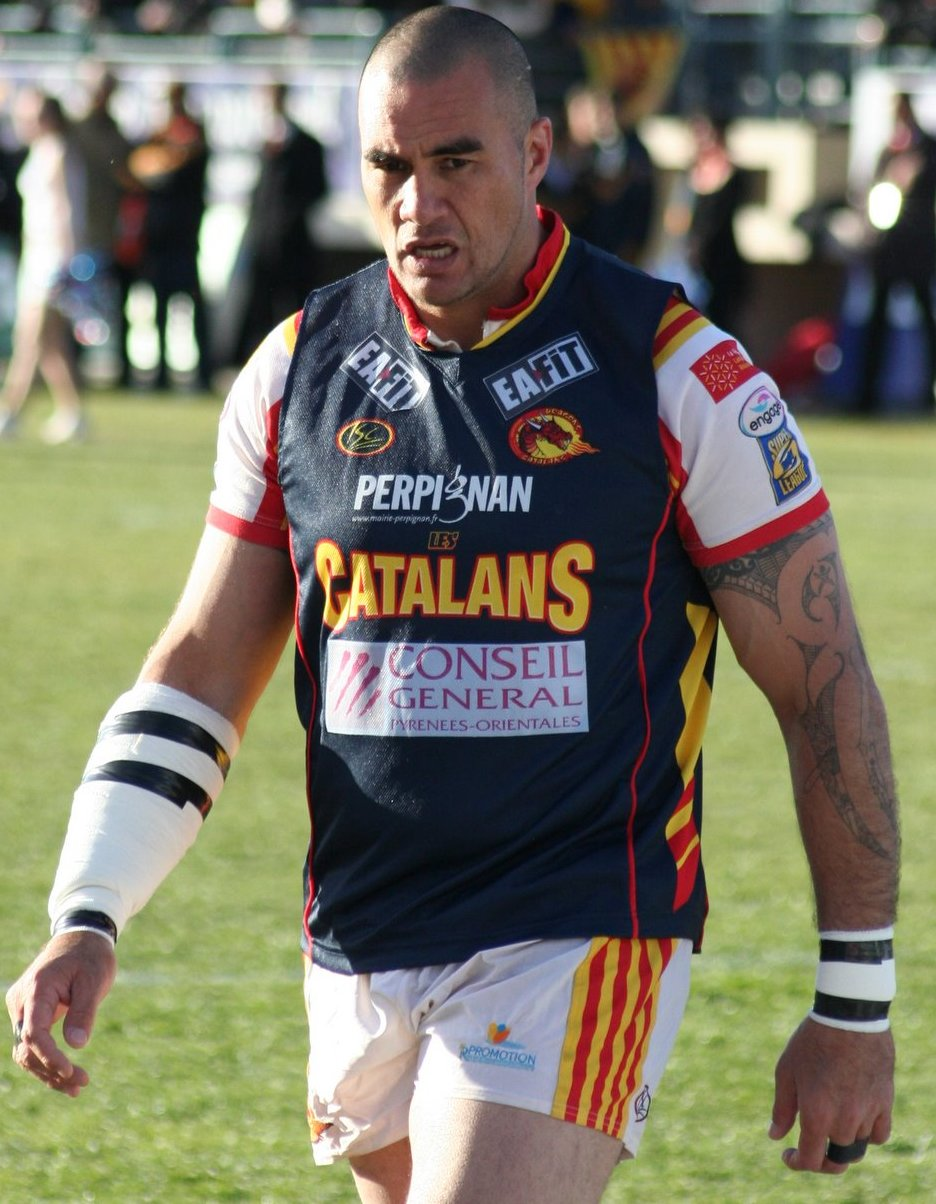

Personal information
- Full name: Alexander Reremorehu Chan
- Born: 22 December 1974 (age 51) Auckland, New Zealand

Playing information
- Height: 184 cm (6 ft 0 in)
- Weight: 105 kg (16 st 7 lb)
- Position: Prop
Club
Years	Team	Pld	T	G	FG	P
1992–93	Taupo
1994	Bay of Plenty Stags	21	4	0	0	16
2000	Northern Eagles	3	0	0	0	0
2001–03	Parramatta Eels	26	2	0	0	8
2004–05	Melbourne Storm	32	4	0	0	16
2006–08	Catalans Dragons	86	12	0	0	48
	Total	168	22	0	0	88
Representative
Years	Team	Pld	T	G	FG	P
1992–93	Bay of Plenty
1993–00	New Zealand Māori	1	1
2004–06	New Zealand	3	1	0	0	4

Coaching information
Representative
Years	Team	Gms	W	D	L	W%
2015–16	Cook Islands	2	1	0	1	50
- Relatives: Tiaki Chan (son); Joe Chan (son); Jesse McLean (nephew); Casey McLean (nephew); Willie McLean (brother-in-law)

Alexander Reremorehu Chan (born 22 December 1974) is a New Zealand former professional rugby league footballer and coach. Chan played for the Catalans Dragons of Super League, Melbourne Storm, Parramatta Eels and Northern Eagles in the NRL.

A New Zealand international representative forward, Chan had also previously played for the Bay of Plenty Stags in New Zealand, and has also played for the Aotearoa Māori team.

== Background ==
Chan is of Chinese-Māori descent.

His sons Tiaki Chan and Joe Chan also played for the Catalans Dragons in the Super League.

== Early career ==
Chan started playing football at age six with Taupo United rugby union club, playing rugby league with Taupa Hawks from age 10. He was educated at St Stephen's boarding school near Auckland, and was selected in both junior rugby league and rugby union representative teams.

After leaving school, Chan played two seasons with Taupo Broncos.

== Playing career ==
Moving to Sydney to play professional rugby league, he joined the North Sydney Bears. He played reserve grade for Norths in 1995–96, crossing to Western Suburbs Magpies for the 1997 season. Chan represented New Zealand at the 1997 Rugby League World Sevens.

Leaving Wests, Chan joined Wentworthville Magpies, winning Metro Cup premierships in 1998 and 1999.

Chan then signed with NRL club Northern Eagles, making his first grade debut in round 15 2000 against the New Zealand Warriors.

Chan played at fullback for the Māori in 1999 and earlier represented the team at the 1994 Pacific Cup. Chan was selected for the Aotearoa Māori side at the 2000 World Cup but did not play a match.

After the 2000 season, Chan was a regular first grade player for the Parramatta Eels from 2001 to 2003, coming from the interchange bench in their 2001 NRL grand final loss to the Newcastle Knights. While with the Eels, he was hampered by injuries, suffering three broken arms in two years limiting him to 26 appearances.

Chan played for Melbourne Storm during the 2004 and 2005 seasons where he was suspended three times by the judiciary for high tackles. During round 20 of the 2004 NRL season, Chan was charged and later suspended for four weeks after a reckless high tackle on Parramatta player Nathan Hindmarsh.

Granted an early release from his contract in Melbourne, Chan finished his professional career at the end of the 2008 Super League season, after making 86 appearances for Catalans Dragons, including in the 2007 Challenge Cup Final.

== Coaching ==
Chan returned to the Wentworthville Magpies as coach of the Sydney Shield team, guiding the team to a premiership in 2015. He also coached the Cook Islands for two matches 2015–16, with one win; 30–20 Lebanon and one loss; 8–28 Tonga.
