= Casey McLean =

New Zealand international rugby league footballer

Personal information
- Full name: Casey McLean
- Born: 24 April 2006 (age 20) Blacktown, New South Wales, Australia
- Height: 187 cm (6 ft 2 in)
- Weight: 95 kg (14 st 13 lb)

Playing information
- Position: Centre, Wing
Club
Years	Team	Pld	T	G	FG	P
2024–	Penrith Panthers	50	30	0	0	120
Representative
Years	Team	Pld	T	G	FG	P
2024–	New Zealand	9	17	0	0	68
2026	New South Wales	1	0	0	0	0
- Source: As of 15 November 2026
- Father: Willie McLean
- Relatives: Jesse McLean (brother); Alex Chan (uncle); Joe Chan (cousin); Tiaki Chan (cousin)

Casey McLean (born 24 April 2006) is a New Zealand international rugby league footballer who plays as a centre or winger for the Penrith Panthers in the National Rugby League.

== Background ==
McLean is of Māori descent, and is the younger brother of fellow Penrith player Jesse McLean. He is first cousins with Joe Chan and Tiaki Chan, and is the nephew of Alex Chan. Much like his brother Jesse, Casey also played rugby union at school.

McLean played his junior rugby league for the Blacktown City Bears in the Penrith District Junior Rugby League. He came through the grades at Penrith in Harold Matthews Cup and Jersey Flegg Cup.

== Playing career ==
=== 2024 ===
In 2024, he played at centre for New South Wales at under-19 level in a 14–10 victory in the 2024 under-19 State of Origin.

In round 17 of the 2024 NRL season, McLean made his first grade debut for the Penrith Panthers in their 6–16 loss against the North Queensland Cowboys playing at centre. He scored his first NRL try in round 21, in a big 46–10 victory against the St. George Illawarra Dragons.

McLean made an extraordinary international debut for the New Zealand Kiwis during the 2024 Pacific Championships promotion-relegation clash against Papua New Guinea at CommBank Stadium on 10 November, where he scored a record-equalling four tries. At just 18 years and 200 days old, his performance in the 54-12 victory secured both his legacy and the Kiwis' top-tier status.

=== 2025 ===
McLean played a total of 23 games for Penrith in the 2025 NRL season, scoring 16 tries, as the club finished 7th on the table. McLean played in Penrith's narrow preliminary final loss against Brisbane, where he contentiously had a runaway intercept try disallowed by a touch judge.

He scored two tries for New Zealand in the 24-18 2025 Pacific Championships win over Samoa in Auckland on 18 October 2025.

He scored another try for New Zealand in the 36-14 2025 finals win against Samoa on 9 November 2025. He was quoted to be "As strong as 3 Samoan defenders" when ball in hand.

=== 2026 ===
He made his New South Wales debut in Game 1 of the 2026 State of Origin on 27 May 2026, coming off the bench, in the 22-20 win. On 15 August, the Panthers announced that McLean had re-signed with the club until the end of 2030. McLean played 20 games for Penrith in the 2026 NRL season as the club claimed the minor premiership. McLean played in the clubs shock preliminary final loss to Newcastle.

== Statistics ==
Year	Team	Games	Tries	Pts
2024	Penrith Panthers	7	3	12
2025	Penrith Panthers	23	16	64
2026	Penrith Panthers	20	11	44
2027	Penrith Panthers			
	Totals	50	30	120
