= Shane Rodney =

Australian rugby league footballer

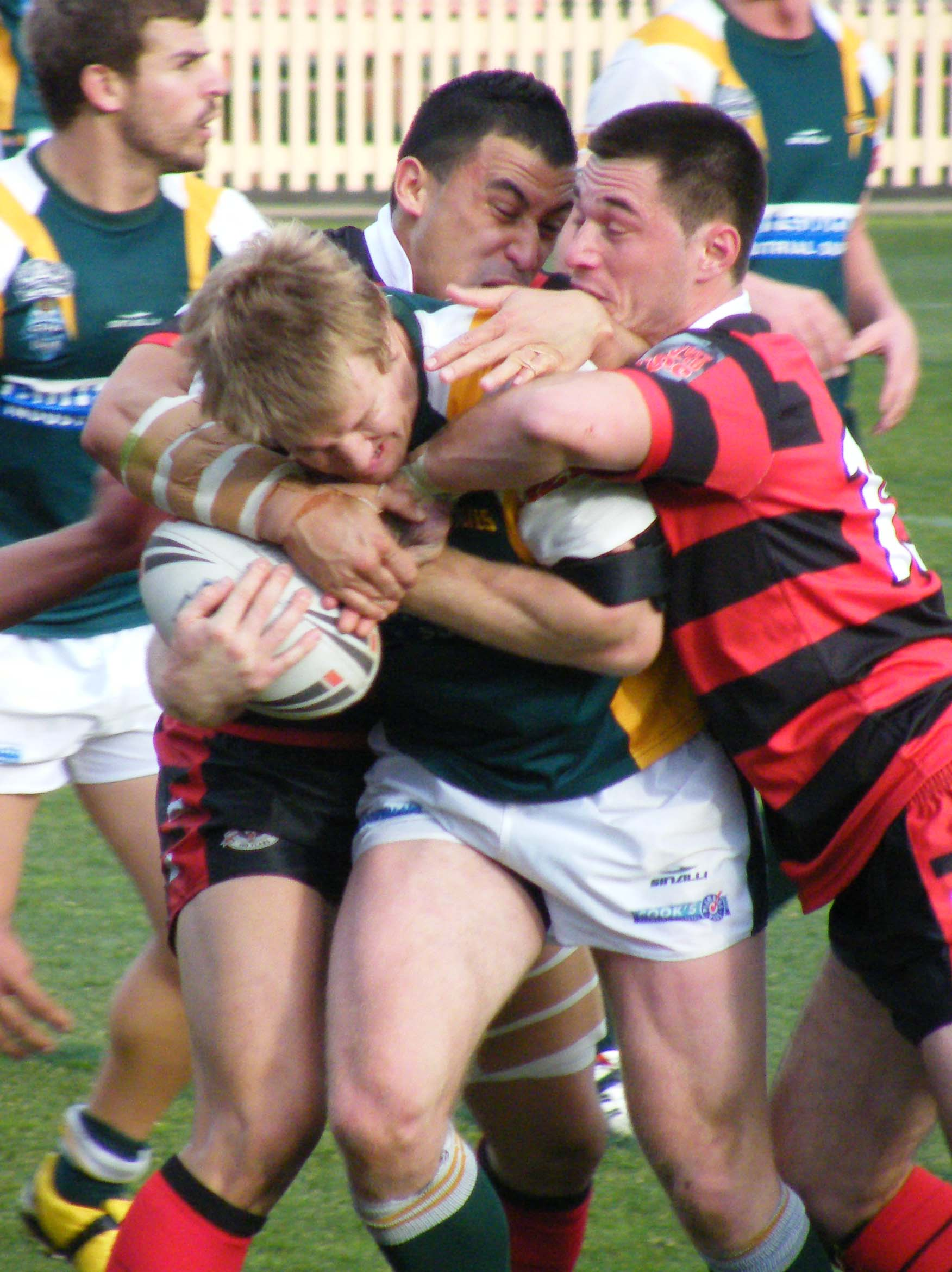
- Rodney playing for the Windsor Wolves

Personal information
- Born: 15 August 1983 (age 43) Tamworth, New South Wales, Australia

Playing information
- Height: 182 cm (6 ft 0 in)
- Weight: 97 kg (15 st 4 lb)
- Position: Second-row, Lock
Club
Years	Team	Pld	T	G	FG	P
2002–08	Penrith Panthers	79	11	9	0	62
2009–11	Manly Sea Eagles	52	3	16	0	44
2012–13	London Broncos	33	4	16	0	48
	Total	164	18	41	0	154
Representative
Years	Team	Pld	T	G	FG	P
2004	NSW City	1	0	0	0	0

Shane Rodney (born 15 August 1983) is an Australian former professional rugby league footballer who played in the 2000s and 2010s. He played for the London Broncos of Super League. He previously played for the Penrith Panthers, winning the 2003 NRL premiership with them, and the Manly-Warringah Sea Eagles whom he won the 2011 NRL Grand Final with, primarily as a lock or in the second-row. In 2019, Rodney coached the St Marys Saints Sydney Shield side.

== Playing career ==
Following a bull-riding accident when he was 15, Rodney decided to give up rodeoing and concentrate on rugby league as the "safer" option. A Penrith junior with Riverstone and Emu Plains JRLFC, in 2002 Rodney was selected to play for the New South Wales under-19 squad.

=== National Rugby League ===
He made his NRL début against Melbourne Storm in round 20 of the 2002 NRL season. The following season Rodney played from the interchange bench in the 2003 NRL grand final-winning Penrith Panthers team which defeated the Sydney Roosters, 18–6.

As 2003 NRL premiers, the Penrith club travelled to England to face Super League VIII champions, the Bradford Bulls in the 2004 World Club Challenge. Rodney played from the interchange bench in the Penrith's 22–4 loss. Also in 2004 Rodney was selected to represent for City in that year's City vs Country Origin match.

Injured in round 23, 2006, Rodney did not return to the NRL playing field until June, 2008. He underwent surgery on his ankle, spine and had two shoulder reconstructions.

After seven years with Penrith, Rodney signed with the Manly-Warringah Sea Eagles for the 2009 NRL season.

Rodney won a second premiership as part of Manly's victorious 2011 NRL Grand Final squad. He, along with Joe Galuvao have played in the same premiership team twice, Galuvao being Rodney's teammate in Penrith's victorious 2003 NRL Grand Final squad.

=== Super League ===
Rodney signed a deal with the Super League team, the London Broncos, for the 2012 season, reuniting with former 2003 NRL Grand Final teammate, Craig Gower. Rodney also assumed goal-kicking duties a few times during the season.

=== Coaching ===
In 2021, Rodney signed on to be coach of Orange Hawks for the 2022 Peter McDonald Premiership.
