= Tiaki Chan =

France international rugby league footballer

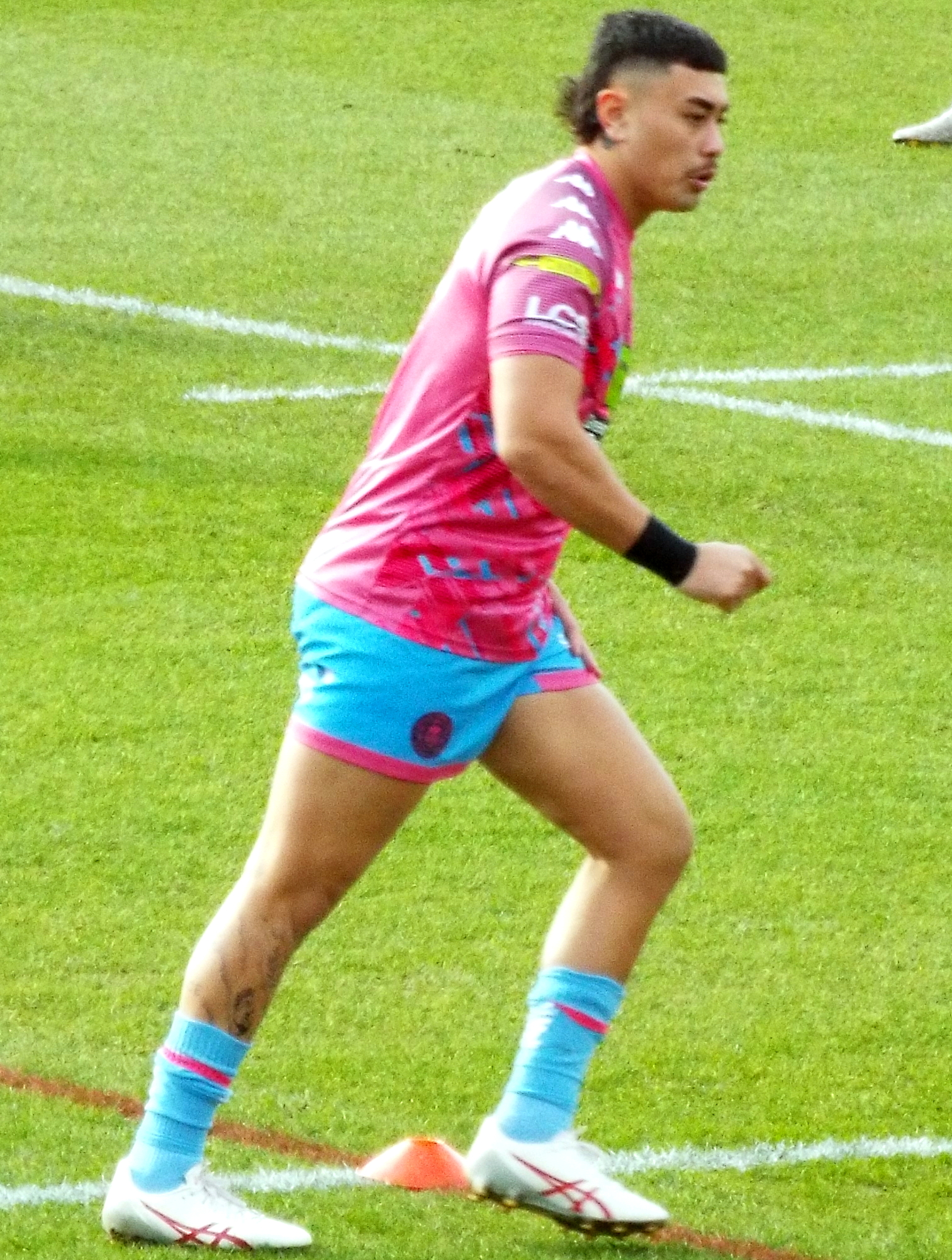

Personal information
- Full name: Tiaki Chan
- Born: 15 June 2000 (age 26) Australia
- Height: 6 ft 1 in (1.86 m)
- Weight: 15 st 8 lb (99 kg)

Playing information
- Position: Prop, Second-row
Club
Years	Team	Pld	T	G	FG	P
2018–21	Saint-Estève XIII Catalan	44	13	0	0	52
2022–23	Catalans Dragons	16	1	0	0	4
2023(DR)	→ Toulouse Olympique	4	0	0	0	0
2024–2026	Wigan Warriors	2	0	0	0	0
2024(loan)	→ Hull FC	9	1	0	0	4
2025(loan)	→ Salford Red Devils	23	2	0	0	8
2026(loan)	→ Catalans Dragons	5	0	0	0	0
2026	→ Toulouse Olympique (loan)	10	0	0	0	0
2026–	Toulouse Olympique	2	1	0	0	4
	Total	115	18	0	0	72
Representative
Years	Team	Pld	T	G	FG	P
2023–	France	5	1	0	0	4
- Source: As of 16 October 2026
- Father: Alex Chan
- Relatives: Joe Chan (brother); Willie McLean (uncle); Jesse McLean (cousin); Casey McLean (cousin)

Tiaki Chan (born 15 June 2000) is a France international rugby league footballer who plays as a prop for Toulouse Olympique in the Super League and France.

== Personal life ==
Chan's father Alex is a former Catalans Dragons and New Zealand international player. His brother Joe is also a professional rugby league footballer. Chan's cousins Casey Mclean and Jesse McLean are also professional rugby league footballers.

== Club career ==
=== Catalans Dragons ===
In 2022 he made his Catalans Dragons debut in the Super League against the Leeds Rhinos. Chan played 13 games for Catalans in the 2023 Super League season but did not play in their 2023 Super League Grand Final loss against Wigan.

=== Melbourne Storm ===
On 26 June 2023 it was reported that he had signed with the Storm for the 2024 season on a three-year deal.

==== Hull F.C. (loan) ====
On 7 May 2024 it was reported that he had signed for Hull F.C. in the Super League on loan

==== Salford Red Devils (loan) ====
On 31 January 2025, it was announced that Chan had joined the Salford Red Devils on a season long loan from the Melbourne Storm

==== Catalans Dragons (loan) ====
On 19 February 2026 it was reported that he had signed for the Catalans Dragons in the Super League on an initial one-month loan.

==== Toulouse Olympique (loan) ====
On 27 March 2026 it was reported that he had signed for Toulouse Olympique in the Super League on loan until the end of the 2026 season.

==== Toulouse Olympique ====
On 8 July 2026 his move to Toulouse Olympique was made permanent, joining the club on a 1.5 year deal until the end of the 2028 season, with an optional extra year.

== International career ==
Chan made his France début on 29 April 2023 in the 64-0 defeat to England at the Halliwell Jones Stadium.
