= Chris Levy =

Australian rugby league footballer

Personal information
- Full name: Christopher Levy
- Born: 31 October 1977 (age 49)

Playing information
- Position: Halfback
Club
| Years | Team | Pld | T | G | FG | P |
|---|---|---|---|---|---|---|
| 1998–01 | Penrith Panthers | 8 | 1 | 0 | 0 | 4 |
| 2005–06 | York City Knights | 25 | 0 | 0 | 0 | 0 |
| | Total | 33 | 1 | 0 | 0 | 4 |
- Source: As of 30 January 2023

Chris Levy (born 31 October 1977) is an Australian former professional rugby league footballer who played in the 1990s and 2000s. He played for Penrith in the NRL competition and for York City Knights in England.

== Playing career ==
Levy made his first grade debut for Penrith in round 12 of the 1998 NRL season against North Queensland. Levy played off the bench in Penrith's 36-28 loss. The game remains the biggest comeback in NSWRL/NRL history as Penrith lead the match 26-0 at halftime before North Queensland scored 36 points in the second half. Levy would go on to play a total of eight matches for Penrith over four years. At the end of 2001, Levy signed for French side Villefranche. In 2005, Levy joined York and captained the team to promotion as they claimed the LHF National League Two trophy.
