= Joe Chan =

Australian rugby league footballer

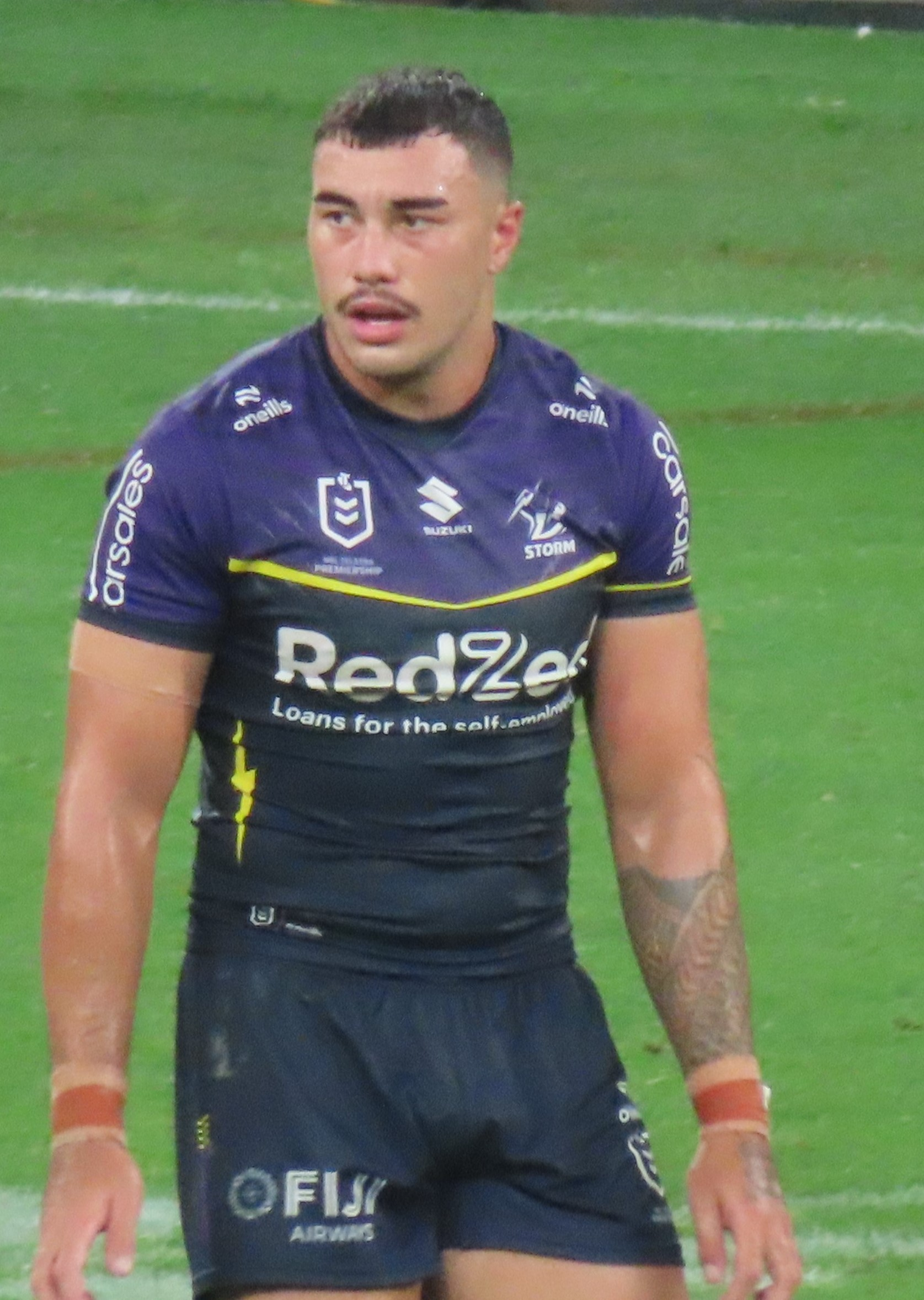

Personal information
- Full name: Joseph Chan
- Born: 10 March 2002 (age 24) Sydney, New South Wales, Australia
- Height: 6 ft 3 in (1.90 m)
- Weight: 15 st 8 lb (99 kg)

Playing information
- Position: Second-row, Centre
Club
Years	Team	Pld	T	G	FG	P
2021–22	Catalans Dragons	29	9	0	0	36
2023–26	Melbourne Storm	47	4	0	0	16
2027-	North Queensland	0	0	0	0	0
	Total	76	13	0	0	52
- Source: As of 6 November 2026
- Father: Alex Chan
- Relatives: Tiaki Chan (brother); Willie McLean (uncle); Casey McLean (cousin)

Joseph Chan (born 10 March 2002) is a professional rugby league footballer who plays as a second-row forward for the North Queensland Cowboys in the National Rugby League (NRL).

He previously played for Catalans Dragons in the Super League and Saint-Esteve in the Elite One Championship.

== Background ==
Chan is of Chinese, Māori, Samoan and Irish heritage and is the son of former New Zealand international Alex Chan and brother of Tiaki Chan. He played his junior rugby league for St Clair Comets, before moving to Catalans Dragons. Chan is first cousins with Penrith Panthers centre Casey McLean. Chan attended St.Dominic’s College, Penrith before moving to the south of France to complete his schooling.

== Career ==
In 2021 he made his Catalans debut in the Challenge Cup against the Warrington Wolves. On 22 April 2022 he signed a two-year contract to play for the Melbourne Storm for the 2023 and 2024 seasons.

Chan made his NRL debut in round 27 of the 2023 NRL season for the Melbourne Storm against Broncos at Suncorp Stadium. Being presented with jersey (cap number 233), Joe along with his father and former Melbourne Storm (cap number 71), Alex Chan are the first father-son Storm duo.

Chan went onto win the 2023 Queensland Cup with Storm feeder club the Brisbane Tigers where he came off the interchange bench in their 22–18 grand final victory over Burleigh. He would also be recognised as the Tigers Rookie of the Year at the club's annual awards.

On 27 August 2024, Chan re-signed with Melbourne until the end of 2028. On 29 September 2024, Chan played for Melbourne's feeder team North Sydney in their NSW Cup Grand Final loss against Newtown.

On 31 August 2026, Melbourne announced that Chan would depart the club at the end of the season and join the North Queensland Cowboys. Chan played 18 games for Melbourne in the 2026 NRL season as the club finished 10th on the table, missing the finals for the first time since 2010.

== Honours and achievements ==
Individual:

- Brisbane Tigers Rookie of the Year: 2023

Club:

- Queensland Cup Premiers: 2023

== Statistics ==
Year	Team	Games	Tries	Pts
2021	Catalans Dragons	7	2	8
2022	Catalans Dragons	22	7	28
2023	Melbourne Storm	1		
2024	Melbourne Storm	11	1	4
2025	Melbourne Storm	17	1	4
2026	Melbourne Storm	13	2	8
	Totals	71	13	52
