= Danny Galea =

Australian rugby league footballer

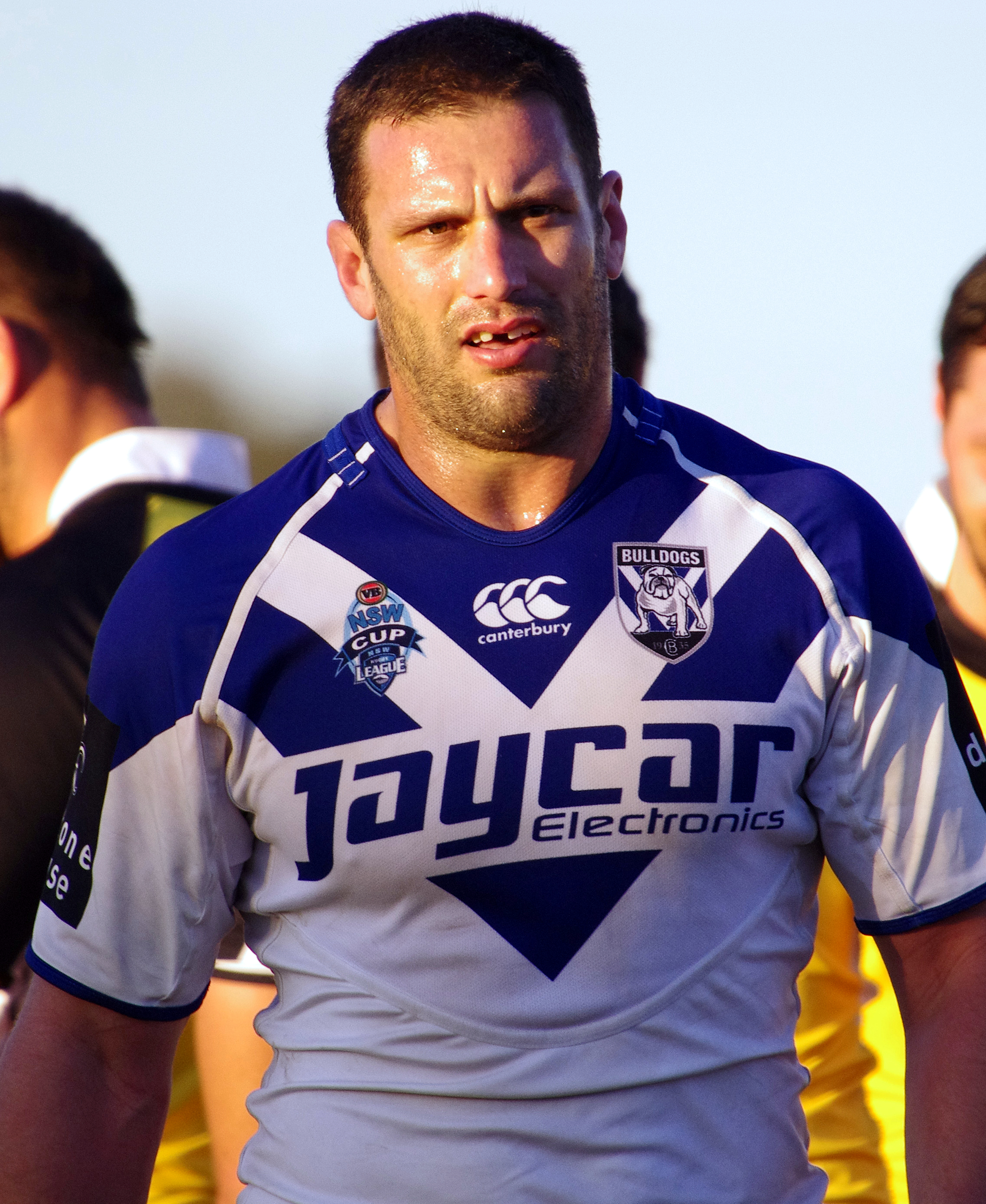

Personal information
- Full name: Daniel Galea
- Born: 20 September 1983 (age 43) Sydney, New South Wales, Australia

Playing information
- Height: 187 cm (6 ft 2 in)
- Weight: 97 kg (15 st 4 lb)
- Position: Second-row, Centre, Lock
Club
| Years | Team | Pld | T | G | FG | P |
|---|---|---|---|---|---|---|
| 2002–06 | Penrith Panthers | 66 | 15 | 0 | 0 | 60 |
| 2007–09 | Wests Tigers | 34 | 1 | 0 | 0 | 4 |
| 2010–11 | Canberra Raiders | 20 | 0 | 0 | 0 | 0 |
| 2012 | Penrith Panthers | 14 | 0 | 0 | 0 | 0 |
| 2014–15 | Widnes Vikings | 51 | 7 | 0 | 0 | 28 |
| | Total | 185 | 23 | 0 | 0 | 92 |

Daniel "Danny" Galea (born 20 September 1983) is an Australian former professional rugby league footballer who played for the Penrith Panthers, the Wests Tigers and the Canberra Raiders in the National Rugby League, and for the Widnes Vikings in the Super League.

== Background ==
Galea was born in Sydney, New South Wales, Australia. He is of Maltese descent.

Galea attended Walters Road Public School and Evans High School, in Blacktown, Sydney, and played junior football with Blacktown City and Emu Plains JRLFC.

== Career ==
Galea played a handful of games for Penrith Panthers in 2002 & 2003, but from 2004 on was a regular in the starting side, playing in the centres . He joined the Wests Tigers from 2007, with coach Tim Sheens playing him in the back row, mostly from the bench. In his first season with Wests Tigers he played in just two games. Over the three years he spent at the club, he scored just one try, in what was to be his last appearance.

Galea signed a one-year deal with the Canberra Raiders on 4 November 2009, and at the end of the year agreed to remain at the club for another season. He played in twenty games in his three years with the Raiders, and was a member of the starting side as they lost the last 6 games of 2011.

Galea signed a two-year deal to return to the Penrith Panthers on 2 September 2011.

Galea signed with the Canterbury-Bankstown Bulldogs on 28 June 2013, after being unable to make the Penrith Panthers first grade side in 2013. He did not play any first-grade at Canterbury club.

Galea joined the Widnes Vikings in the Super League in 2014. On 4 May 2014, he signed a new deal that will keep him at Widnes for another two years. He announced his retirement at the end of the 2015 season.

== Career highlights ==
- First Grade Debut: 2002 – Round 19, Panthers vs Newcastle Knights at EnergyAustralia Stadium, 21 July
