= David Liddiard =

Australian rugby league footballer

David Liddiard OAM
Personal information
- Full name: David James Liddiard
- Born: 24 February 1961 (age 64); Penrith, New South Wales, Australia

Playing information
- Position: Fullback, Wing, Centre
Club
Years	Team	Pld	T	G	FG	P
1983–85	Parramatta Eels	58	15	0	0	68
1985–86	Oldham R.L.F.C.	15	12	0	0	48
1986–87	Penrith Panthers	32	11	0	0	44
1988–89	Parramatta Eels	8	1	0	0	4
1989–90	Hull F.C.	7	4	0	0	16
1990–92	Manly Sea Eagles	34	10	0	0	40
1992–93	Hull Kingston Rovers	29	11	0	0	44
	Total	183	64	0	0	264

David James Liddiard OAM (born 24 February 1961) is an Australian former professional rugby league footballer who played in the 1980s and 1990s.

== Playing career ==
Liddiard made his first grade debut for Parramatta in the 1983 season where he won the Dally M rookie of the year award and was also a member of Parramatta's 1983 premiership winning team defeating Manly-Warringah in the grand final.

The following season, Liddiard played in the 1984 grand final where Parramatta were defeated by Canterbury 6–4. In 1986, Liddiard joined Penrith and played there for two seasons before rejoining Parramatta.

Liddiard only managed eight appearances for Parramatta over two years and he left the club to join Manly. Liddiard spent three years at Manly before departing the at the end of 1992. Liddiard played in England for Oldham (1985–86), Hull FC (1989–90) and Hull Kingston Rovers (1992–93 and 1993–94).

== Post-playing ==
In 2014 Liddiard was awarded with the Medal of the Order of Australia for his services to Indigenous youth, sporting and employment programs.
