= Penrith District Rugby League =

Rugby competition in Australia

- Sport: Rugby league
- Instituted: 1967
- General Manager: Blake South
- Number of teams: 24
- Region: Penrith, New South Wales (NSWRL)
- Premiers: Emu Plains (Don Feltis Cup); Lower Mountains (Barry Nichol Shield); Windsor Wolves (Jan Cameron Trophy)
- Most titles: St Marys Saints (16 titles)
- Broadcast partner: Bar Tv
- Related competition: Sydney Combined Competition

The Penrith District Junior Rugby League (PDJRL) is an Australian amateur rugby league competition for senior and junior rugby league clubs in the Penrith, Blacktown, and Blue Mountains area.

== History ==
The competition was founded in 1912 and grew gradually as more clubs from the surrounding areas entered the competition. The first Penrith club were the Waratahs and adopted the blue and white colours, playing out of Penrith Showground. When the Parramatta District Rugby League was formed all the teams from the Penrith and surrounding areas affiliated and played in the Parramatta League. During the early-1960s the NSWRL Second Division was formed where a team from Penrith began playing, in 1967 the now Penrith Panthers were promoted to the NSWRL First Grade competition in that year the following clubs were invited to enter the Penrith District Junior Rugby League; Blacktown, Blacktown Workers, Blacktown St Patricks, Emu Plains, Londonderry Mount Druitt, Penrith Waratahs, Riverstone, Rooty Hill, Richmond, Springwood, Windsor, Warragamba, Warrimoo and St Marys.

The number of clubs in the 1970s grew gradually and more than doubled to 32 clubs. During the late-1980s it was decided to reduce number of clubs to 22. Some teams were either merged or became standalone clubs;

- Blacktown Leagues and Blacktown RSL became Blacktown City.
- Springwood and Warrimoo became Lower Mountains.
- Colo, Richmond and North Richmond became Hawkesbury City.
- Colyton and St. Clair became separate clubs.
- Blackett and Hebersham became Mt Druitt City.
- Tregear and Whalan became Wests Mt Druitt.

== Current Open Age Clubs ==
Club	Moniker	Suburb	Division/s
Blacktown Workers	Workers	Blacktown, New South Wales	2
Colyton	Colts	Colyton, New South Wales	1, 3
Cambridge Park	Panthers	Cambridge Park, New South Wales	1, 3, W1
Doonside	Roos	Doonside, New South Wales	2, W1
Emu Plains	Emus	Emu Plains, New South Wales	1, 3, W2
Glenmore Park	Broncos	Glenmore Park, New South Wales	W1
Minchinbury	Jets	Minchinbury, New South Wales	1, 3
Riverstone	Razorbacks	Riverstone, New South Wales	1, 3, W2
Penrith Brothers	Brothers	Penrith, New South Wales	1, 3, W2
Penrith	Warratahs	Penrith, New South Wales	2, W2
St Clair	Comets	St Clair, New South Wales	1, 3, W1
St Marys	Saints	St Marys, New South Wales	1, W1, W2
St Patricks	Saints	The Ponds, New South Wales	2
Western City	Tigers	Penrith, New South Wales	2, 3, W2
Windsor	Wolves	Windsor, New South Wales	1, 3

== All District clubs ==
Club	Inaugural Season	Former Comp (Pre 1967)	Home Ground
Blacktown Bears	1967 as Blacktown		Jack Myers Field
Blacktown Workers	1967		HE Laybutt Sports Complex
Brothers Penrith	1968 as St Dominic's		Parker Street oval
Cambridge Park RLFC	1968		Allsop Patterson Oval
Colyton Colts	1968		CEC Blinkhorn Oval
Doonside Roos	1968		Kareela Reserve
Emu Plains	1967		Leonay Oval
Glenmore Park Brumbies	1994		Ched Towns Reserve
Hawkesbury City Hawks	1987		Turnbull Oval
Mountain Devils	1968 as Katoomba Devils		Katoomba Showground
Lower Mountains Eagles	Late 1980s		Warrimoo Oval
Minchinbury Jets	1994		Federation Forest
North West Magpies JRLC	2018		Tamplin Oval
Penrith Waratahs	1915 as Penrith United	Western Districts/ Parramatta	Doug Rennie Fields
Quakers Hill Destroyers	1995		Waite Reserve
Riverstone Razorbacks	1915*	Western Districts/ Parramatta	Basil Andrews Field
Western Vikings	2020		Whalan Reserve
Schofield's Crusaders	2023		
St Clair Comets	1984		Peppertree Sports Complex
St Marys Saints	1908	Western Districts/ Parramatta	The Kingsway (Saturday) St Marys Leagues club Stadium (Sunday)
St Patricks Blacktown	1967		The Ponds
Western City Tigers	1984 as Mt Druitt City		Heber Park
Windsor Wolves	1909	Western Districts/ Parramatta	Windsor Sports Complex

== Former clubs ==
Club	Inaugural Season	Final Year	Reason
Londonderry Greys	1967	2022	Folded
Mt Druitt Lions	1967	2022	Dissolved
West Mt Druitt Raiders	1989	N/A	Folded
Rooty Hill Dragons	1985	2020	Folded
Springwood	1967	Late 1980s	Merged With Warimoo to become Lower Mountain Eagles
Warimoo	1967	Late 1980s	Merged With Springwood to become Lower Mountain Eagles
Colo	1960s–1980s*	1987	Merged to become Hawkesbury City
Richmond	1915*, 1967	1987	Merged to become Hawkesbury City
North Richmond	1960s–1980s*	1987	Merged to become Hawkesbury City
Blackett Bears	1960s–1980s*	1984	Merged with Hebrshem to form Mt Druitt City
Hebershem	1960s–1980s*	1984	Merged With Blacket to form Mt Druitt City
Tregear Foxes	1960s–1980s*	1989	Merged with Whalan to form West Mt Druitt
Whalan Warriors	1971	1989	Merged With Tregear to form West Mt Druitt
Lethbridge Park Ravens	1960s–1980s*	1989	Merged With West Mt. Druitt
Mt Druitt Dragons	1967	1985	Merged With Rooty Hill RSL to form Rooty Hill Dragons
Rooty Hill RSL	1967	1985	Merged With Mt Druitt Dragons to form Rooty Hill Dragons
North Mt Druitt Millers	1960s–1970s*	Late 1980s	Merged With Shalvey to form Mt Druitt Devils
Shalvey Bears	1960s–1970s*	Late 1980s	Merged With North Mt. Druitt to form Mt Druitt Devil
PCYC Spartans-Shalvey	Unknown	Unknown	Unknown
North St Marys	1960s–1970s*	Mid 1980s	Folded
St Marys Band Club	1960s–1970s*	Late 1980s	Folded
Warragamba Wombats	1967	1986	Departed to Group 6 CRL

- Teams for cities with 1915 had teams playing, Penrith before the junior league.
- Teams with 1960s–1980s means the team may have had there first season from 1960s–1980s.

== List of A Grade (Don Feltis Cup) Premiers ==
Season	Premiers	Score	Runners-up	Ground / Crowd
1967	Richmond	12–0	St Marys	Riverstone Park
1968	Penrith Waratahs		St Marys	Penrith Park
1969	Windsor	10–5	Mount Druitt Ghosts	Penrith Park
1970	Richmond	13–9	Riverstone	Penrith Park
1971	Riverstone	22–13	Millers Mount Druitt	Penrith Park
1972	Riverstone			
1973	Richmond	10–8	Windsor Wolves	
1974				
1975				
1976				
1977	St Marys			
1978	St Marys			
1979				
1980	St Marys			
1981				
1982				
1983				
1984	St Marys	18–6	Colyton	
1985				
1986				
1987	St Marys			
1988	Windsor	24–12	St Marys	
1989	Blacktown City			
1990	St Marys			
1991				
1992	Cambridge Park	18–14	Colyton	
1993	St Marys			
1994				
1995	St Marys			
1996			Blacktown City	
1997				
1998				
1999	St Marys	24–6	Colyton	
2000	St Marys	30–16	Colyton	
2001	St Clair		St Marys	
2002	St Marys	46–24	Doonside	
2003	Brothers Penrith		St Marys	
2004	Brothers Penrith	23–14	Doonside	
2005	St Marys	28–24	Doonside	
2006	St Clair		Doonside	
2007	St Marys			
2008	Brothers Penrith	20–14	Emu Plains	
2009	Emu Plains		St Marys	
2010	St Marys	19–18 (G.P)	Emu Plains	
2011				
2012	Colyton		Cambridge Park	
2013	St Marys	32–12	Brothers Penrith	Penrith Stadium
2014	Brothers Penrith	36–12	St Marys	Penrith Stadium, 2,449
2015	St Marys	24–20	St Clair	Penrith Stadium, 3,717
2016	St Clair	46–30	St Patricks Blacktown	Penrith Stadium, 3,428
2017	St Clair	42–24	Brothers Penrith	St Marys Stadium
2018	Windsor	28–4	Glenmore Park	Penrith Stadium
2019	St Clair	32–0	Glenmore Park	Penrith Stadium
2020*	Cambridge Park	18-14	Minchinbury	Windsor Stadium
2021	Season suspended Minor Premier: Colyton			
2022	Minchinbury	32–30	Emu Plains	St Marys Leagues Stadium
2023	Emu Plains	32-26	Windsor	St Marys Leagues Stadium
2024	Emu Plains	20-18	Colyton	Windsor Sporting Complex
2025	St Clair	25-24	Windsor	Windsor Sporting Complex
2026	Emu Plains	34-12	Windsor	St Marys Stadium

*In 2020 Penrith did not have a dedicated Open age comp but did feature in the South Western Open Age Coemptions

== See also ==
- Balmain District Junior Rugby League
- Cronulla-Sutherland District Rugby Football League
- Manly-Warringah/North Sydney District Rugby League
- Parramatta Junior Rugby League
- South Sydney District Junior Rugby Football League
- Sydney Roosters Juniors
- Rugby League Competitions in Australia
