= Troy Wozniak =

Australian rugby league footballer

Personal information
- Full name: Troy Wozniak
- Born: 6 January 1978 (age 48) Blacktown, New South Wales, Australia

Playing information
- Height: 181 cm (5 ft 11 in)
- Weight: 102 kg (16 st 1 lb)
- Position: Second-row, Lock, Centre
Club
Years	Team	Pld	T	G	FG	P
1999	Balmain Tigers	2	0	0	0	0
2000	Parramatta Eels	10	1	0	0	4
2002–03	Wests Tigers	26	9	0	0	36
2004	Widnes Vikings	20	1	0	0	4
	Total	58	11	0	0	44

Troy Wozniak (born 6 January 1978 in Blacktown, New South Wales) is an Australian former professional rugby league footballer in the Australasian National Rugby League (NRL) competition. He played for the Balmain Tigers, Parramatta Eels and Wests Tigers as well as Widnes Vikings in the Super League. Wozniak was primarily a utility player.

== Playing career ==
Wozniak made his first grade debut for Balmain in round 6 of the 1999 NRL season against North Sydney at Leichhardt Oval. He made one further appearance for Balmain which was a 64–12 loss against North Sydney at North Sydney Oval. After Balmain merged with Western Suburbs to form the Wests Tigers, Wozniak was not offered a contract to play for the new team, and he joined Parramatta. He played ten games for the club in the 2000 NRL season, scoring his first try in a 24-22 defeat of the Auckland Warriors in round 9.

In 2002, he joined the Wests Tigers and played 26 matches for the team between 2002 and 2003. Midway through 2002, he was leading the team in offloads and linebreaks, and was described as "one of the team's most penetrating attacking players". He said, "At Parramatta, I didn't reach my potential. I didn't get a chance hardly at all last year. I had a big off-season when I rejoined the Tigers and also, I'm getting a go now, and that has made a difference."

In 2004, Wozniak played for English side Widnes in the Super League.

== Career highlights ==
- First Grade Debut: 1999 - Round 6, Balmain Tigers vs North Sydney Bears at Leichhardt Oval, 10 April.
