= Darren Smith (rugby league) =

Australia international rugby league footballer

Personal information
- Born: 8 December 1968 (age 57) Brisbane, Queensland, Australia

Playing information
- Height: 183 cm (6 ft 0 in)
- Weight: 102 kg (16 st 1 lb)
- Position: Centre, Lock, Second-row
Club
Years	Team	Pld	T	G	FG	P
1990–94	Canterbury Bulldogs	100	36	1	0	146
1995–98	Brisbane Broncos	87	56	0	0	224
1999–02	Canterbury Bulldogs	85	17	0	0	68
2003	St. Helens	31	19	0	0	76
2004–05	Brisbane Broncos	18	6	0	0	24
	Total	321	134	1	0	538
Representative
Years	Team	Pld	T	G	FG	P
1992–02	Queensland	22	2	0	0	8
1997	Queensland (SL)	3	0	0	0	0
1997	Australia (SL)	5	3	0	0	12
1998–03	Australia	7	2	0	0	8
- Source: ,
- Relatives: Jason Smith (brother)

Darren Smith (born 8 December 1968) is an Australian former rugby league footballer who played in the 1990s and 2000s. He played for the Australian national side and also Queensland in the State of Origin. His club football career was spent with the Canterbury-Bankstown Bulldogs, Brisbane Broncos and St. Helens. He is the brother of fellow Maroon and international, Jason Smith.

== Background ==
Born in Brisbane, Queensland on 8 December 1968, Darren Smith went on to play in the Brisbane Rugby League premiership. During the 1988 Great Britain Lions tour of Australia, Smith was selected at 19 years of age to play for the Brisbane rugby league team against the visiting British.

== Playing career ==
=== 1990s ===
In 1990 he moved from Brisbane's Easts Tigers to Sydney's Canterbury-Bankstown Bulldogs. Conspicuous in headgear after suffering a severe concussion in 1991, Smith made his State of Origin début as a reserve for Queensland in the 1992 series. During the 1993 State of Origin series Smith played from the interchange bench n Games 2 and 3, both losses.

Smith was selected to play on the interchange bench in all three games of the 1994 State of Origin series which was eventually lost by Queensland. He looked certain to press for Australian selection until off-field politics took its toll in the 1994 NSWRL season. Smith's refusal to renew his contract with Canterbury, negotiating with two Brisbane clubs instead, saw him used in the limited role of interchange player. Smith's centre place in Canterbury's grand final side was taken by youngster Steven Hughes who made little impact when brought on to the field as a replacement. Smith revealed that he had signed with the South Queensland Crushers but he then did an about-face and successfully sought a release to play with the Brisbane Broncos in 1995.

It was unfortunate that Smith hit possibly his best form at a time when the code was in turmoil, and he did not represent again until 1997's Super League season. He proved his durability at the highest level, making his Test début against New Zealand and playing at lock forward in the 1997 Anzac Test, the first Anzac Test, as well as all five Tests against the New Zealand and Great Britain as well as making three appearances in Queensland's Tri-Series side.

When the game reunified for the 1998 NRL season, Smith returned to the Queensland State of Origin team and was the National Rugby League's top try-scorer for the season, crossing for the final try in Brisbane's 38–12 thrashing of his former club Canterbury in the 1998 NRL grand final. In an ironic twist to his career, Smith announced that he was returning to the Bulldogs in 1999. Smith was selected for the Australian team to play in the 1999 ANZAC Test, and to compete in the end of season 1999 Tri Nations tournament. In the final against New Zealand he played at centre in the Kangaroos' 22–20 victory.

=== 2000s ===
In 2000 he was awarded the Australian Sports Medal for his contribution to Australia's international standing in rugby league. Smith left the Bulldogs at the end of 2002 (denied the opportunity to finally win a premiership with the club when it was stripped of its competition points) to play with English club St. Helens. Having won Super League VI, St Helens contested the 2003 World Club Challenge against 2002 NRL Premiers, the Sydney Roosters. Smith played at second-row forward in Saints' 38–0 loss. At the end of his first English season Smith was unexpectedly called into the Third Test of the Ashes series (despite being 34 years old and outside the NRL) by his former Bulldogs coach, national coach Chris Anderson, who felt the available 2003 Kangaroo centres were not experienced enough.

== Retirement ==
Smith returned to Australia in 2004 and made cameo appearances with the Broncos in two matches while playing for his former club, Eastern Suburbs Tigers. At age 36 years and 284 days, he was the NRL's oldest player in 2005. Smith finally retired as a player after Easts were beaten in the grand final. At the time of his retirement Smith held the record for most tries in a season for the Broncos (together with Steve Renouf) at 23.
