= Ken Nagas =

Australia international rugby league footballer

Personal information
- Born: 18 June 1973 (age 53) Bundaberg, Queensland, Australia

Playing information
- Height: 185 cm (6 ft 1 in)
- Weight: 94 kg (14 st 11 lb)
- Position: Wing, Fullback, Centre
Club
Years	Team	Pld	T	G	FG	P
1992–02	Canberra Raiders	142	59	1	0	238
Representative
Years	Team	Pld	T	G	FG	P
1994	New South Wales	2	0	0	0	0
1997	New South Wales (SL)	3	4	0	0	16
1997	Australia (SL)	5	1	0	0	4

Ken Nagas (born 18 June 1973) is an Australian former professional rugby league footballer who played in the 1990s and 2000s. He played for the Canberra Raiders of the National Rugby League. Nagas primarily played on the wing.

== Background ==
Nagas was born in Bundaberg, Queensland and is of Indigenous Australian and South Pacific island descent.

He played his junior rugby league for the Bundaberg Eels and Wests Bundaberg before moving to Kyogle, New South Wales as a 16-year old. In Kyogle, he played for the Kyogle Turkeys and attended Kyogle High School. In 1991, Nagas signed with the Canberra Raiders. In Canberra, he attended Lake Ginninderra College, where he represented the Australian Schoolboys.

== Playing career ==
=== Canberra Raiders ===
In 1992, while playing for the Raiders' Jersey Flegg Cup side, Nagas represented the New South Wales under-19 side.

In Round 22 of the 1992, Nagas made his first grade debut on the wing in a loss to the Newcastle Knights. It was his only appearance for the season. in 1993, he appeared in nine games for Canberra, scoring 4 tries.

In 1994, Nagas had a breakout season, playing 18 games and scoring 11 tries, most famous being against the St George Dragons in Round 10 at Bruce Stadium, where he ran the length of the field to score while holding the ball in one hand, keeping his shorts up with the other. Nagas went on to play on the wing in Canberra's 36–12 Grand Final win over Canterbury-Bankstown where he scored two tries.

In 1995, Nagas, like the rest of the Canberra Raiders players, signed with Super League and although his great form continued, scoring 14 tries from 19 games, he along with team mates Laurie Daley, Bradley Clyde, Brett Mullins, Ricky Stuart and David Furner (other than Nagas, all were players on Australia's 1994 Kangaroo Tour), were left out of 1995 representative teams as only Australian Rugby League contracted players were selected. Canberra finished equal top on the 1995 ladder with Manly but after defeating rivals Brisbane 14–8 at Suncorp Stadium, the defending premiers were knocked out in the Preliminary Final by eventual premiers Sydney Bulldogs 8–25.

In the 1997 World Club Championship, Nagas scored six tries for Canberra against Halifax, a club record. In the 1997 post season, Nagas was selected to play for Australia in all three matches of the Super League Test series against Great Britain.

After eleven seasons with the one first-grade club, knee problems forced Nagas to retire midway through 2002.

=== Representative career ===
Despite being born and raised in Queensland, Nagas was eligible to represent New South Wales as he had played his first senior game in Kyogle as a 16-year old. He opted to represent New South Wales over his home state, a decision he later regretted. He played for the Blues in games II and III of the 1994 State of Origin series, but after his two try performance in Canberra's Grand Final win over Canterbury, was sensationally left out of the 1994 Kangaroo tour in preference to young Brisbane Broncos winger Wendell Sailor.

He was also selected as a winger for New South Wales in the 1997 Super League Tri-series. Nagas played in games I (against Queensland) and III (against New Zealand), scoring two tries in each game as well as the 'Grand Final' of the series against Queensland at Brisbane's ANZ Stadium. The Tri-series Final is known as the longest professional game of rugby league in Australian history. Noel Goldthorpe kicked a field goal in the 104th minute to win the game 23-22 for NSW after scores were locked at 18-18 after full-time and 22-22 after extra time. Nagas was originally selected in Queensland's wider Tri-Series squad but later decided to remain with New South Wales, having already represented them in State of Origin.

In 1997, Nagas played on the wing for Australia in their 34-22 win over New Zealand in the inaugural ANZAC Test at the Sydney Football Stadium. He later went on to play in the season ending loss to the Kiwis at the North Harbour Stadium in Auckland, before appearing in all 3 tests of the Super League Test series against Great Britain in England at the end of the year. However, while the rest of the rugby league world counts all tests played under the Super League banner as being legitimate test matches, the Australian Rugby League refuses to acknowledge the games from the rebels. Thus unfortunately, Ken Nagas, despite appearing in 5 tests during 1997, is listed as never having represented his country in official Australian records.

== Later years ==
In 2004, Nagas was named as a member of the Canberra Raider's best Aboriginal and Torres Strait Islanders to have played for Canberra.
