= Steve Renouf =

Australia international rugby league footballer

Personal information
- Full name: Steven Renouf
- Born: 8 June 1970 (age 56) Murgon, Queensland, Australia

Playing information
- Height: 180 cm (5 ft 11 in)
- Position: Centre
Club
Years	Team	Pld	T	G	FG	P
1988–99	Brisbane Broncos	183	142	0	0	568
2000–01	Wigan Warriors	59	43	0	0	172
	Total	242	185	0	0	740
Representative
Years	Team	Pld	T	G	FG	P
1991–98	Queensland	11	2	0	0	8
1997	Queensland (SL)	2	2	0	0	8
1992–98	Australia	10	11	0	0	44
1997	Australia (SL)	1	1	0	0	4
- Relatives: Donald Malone (nephew)

Steven Renouf (born 8 June 1970) is an Australian former professional rugby league footballer who played in the 1980s, 1990s and 2000s. Nicknamed 'the Pearl', he was known as one of the sport's greatest centres. Renouf set numerous records for the Brisbane Broncos club. After spending eleven years with Brisbane, which yielded four premierships, he left Australia to play for English club Wigan Warriors, where he spent two seasons before retiring. He was named in Australia's Indigenous team of the century (1908–2007).

== Playing career ==
=== Brisbane Broncos ===
Of Aboriginal and European descent, Renouf was born in Murgon, Queensland on 8 June 1970. A Murgon Mustangs junior, he developed his game with the Brisbane Broncos in his teen years. Renouf made his first grade NSWRL Premiership début in the 1989 Brisbane Broncos season. He scored his first try for the club in 1990, and the following year went on to set a new club record of four tries in a home fixture, and be the Broncos' top try scorer of the 1991 Brisbane Broncos season and 1992 (along with Allan Langer) seasons. In 1992, the Broncos claimed their first premiership, winning the Winfield Cup Grand Final against St. George 28–8, which was highlighted by a 98-metre try to Renouf in the second half. After Willie Carne had somehow managed to avoid being trapped in his in-goal, Broncos captain Allan Langer passed to Renouf who stepped inside Rex Terp and took off downfield with Michael Hancock in support no one in front of him after burning Saints fullback Michael Potter for speed. Veteran Dragons winger Ricky Walford gave chase and made ground on him as Renouf tired over the final 20 metres, but failed to stop him from scoring.

In the weeks following the Broncos Grand Final win, Renouf travelled with the Kangaroos to England for the 1992 World Cup final at the famous Wembley Stadium. Renouf made his début for Australia in front of an international rugby league record attendance of 73,631 fans, scoring the only try of the match after running off a pass from Broncos teammate Kevin Walters in the second half. Australia defeated Great Britain 10–6 to win their sixth Rugby League World Cup. A week later, Renouf played for Brisbane in the 1992 World Club Challenge against 1991–92 British champions Wigan at Central Park in Wigan. The Broncos capped their best year by defeating Wigan 22–8 and becoming the first Australian team to win the World Club Challenge in England.

In 1997, Renouf scored 14 tries, which included a hat-trick against the Cronulla-Sutherland Sharks in the 1997 Super League grand final on 20 September at ANZ Stadium in Brisbane's 26–8 victory. He was therefore named man-of-the-match. No other player would score 3 tries in a Grand Final until Manly winger Michael Robertson did so in 2008.

He played centre for the Brisbane Broncos in their win at the 1998 NRL grand final. Over a decade after leaving the Broncos he was still the club's all-time leading try scorer, having amassed a total of 142 tries.

=== Wigan Warriors ===
Renouf's Wigan Warriors début came in round four of the Challenge Cup against Whitehaven at Central Park. he scored two tries on début in his side's mammoth 98–4 victory.

In 2000, Renouf was awarded the Australian Sports Medal for his contribution to Australia's international standing in rugby league. Renouf played for the Wigan Warriors at centre their 2000 Super League Grand Final loss against St Helens R.F.C. His final game for the Wigan Warriors and indeed his last game at the highest level was the 2001 Super League Grand Final on 13 October at Old Trafford in Manchester. His side lost to the Bradford Bulls by 37–6.

Upon his time at Wigan Warriors, Renouf quoted "The two years at Wigan were absolutely brilliant. I would have liked to stay but they didn’t want to retain me"

=== Back in Australia ===
Following his return to Australia he continued playing football for Easts in the Queensland Cup alongside former Broncos teammate Darren Smith, scoring a try in the 2004 grand final loss to Burleigh. In 2006 Renouf became the 7th former player inducted into the Broncos official Hall of Fame. During the 2007 season at the Broncos' 20-year anniversary celebration, the club announced a list of the 20 best players to play for them to date which included Renouf.

In August 2008, Renouf was named at centre in the Indigenous Team of the Century.

=== Hall of Fame ===
In August 2024, the National Rugby League announced that Renouf was an inductee into the National Rugby League Hall of Fame. Renouf, who was ascribed Hall of Fame number 119, was amongst eleven male players in the 2024 Class.

== Career stats ==
=== Club ===
Season	Team	Appearances	Tries	Goals	Goal-kicking percentage	Field goals	Points
1989 NSWRL Season	Brisbane Broncos	10	–	–	–	–	–
1990 NSWRL Season	Brisbane Broncos	4	2	–	–	–	8
1991 NSWRL Season	Brisbane Broncos	20	15	–	–	–	60
1992 NSWRL Season	Brisbane Broncos	23	12	–	–	–	48
1993 NSWRL Season	Brisbane Broncos	18	16	–	–	–	64
1994 NSWRL Season	Brisbane Broncos	21	23	–	–	–	92
1995 ARL Season	Brisbane Broncos	14	15	–	–	–	60
1996 ARL Season	Brisbane Broncos	22	19	–	–	–	76
1997 Super League season	Brisbane Broncos	15	14	–	–	–	56
1998 NRL Season	Brisbane Broncos	26	20	–	–	–	80
1999 NRL Season	Brisbane Broncos	10	6	–	–	–	24
2000 Challenge Cup	Wigan Warriors	3	3	–	–	–	12
2000 Super League V	Wigan Warriors	29	20	–	–	–	80
2001 Challenge Cup	Wigan Warriors	1	–	–	–	–	–
2001 Super League VI	Wigan Warriors	26	20	–	–	–	80

=== Representative ===
Years	Team	Appearances	Tries	Goals	Goal-kicking percentage	Field goals	Points
1991–1994, 1996, 1998	Queensland	11	2	–	–	–	8
1997	Queensland (Super League)	2	2	–	–	–	8
1992–1994, 1998	Australia	10	11	–	–	–	44
1997	Australia (Super League)	1	–	–	–	–	–

== Personal life ==
At the age of 23, six years after signing with the Brisbane Broncos, Renouf was diagnosed with type 1 diabetes. Renouf remembers that he "had been losing weight quite rapidly, [and] was always going to the toilet and though it was the start of pre-season, [he] had no energy, [he] couldn’t lift anything in the gym". He decided to go to the doctor and found out that he had the disease. According to Renouf "diabetes is not all doom and gloom, you can live with it." His advice to young people who have diabetes is "Never think that it can stop you from achieving your goals. Just look after it, and you can achieve anything. I looked after it...I knew I had to if I wanted to keep playing football."

Renouf has an apprenticeship as an electrician and has also worked in the industry of sales and marketing. He has five children – four sons and one daughter. He is currently working for the Institute for Urban Indigenous Health, as an Ambassador for the Deadly Choices preventative health program.

Since retirement, Renouf has worked as a sideline commentator for Triple M's Blood, Sweat and Beers sports show.

In February 2006, a biography of Renouf was released. Entitled The Pearl: Steve Renouf's Story, the book details his career as a professional rugby league footballer, but it also covers his early life, including his family heritage and his childhood in the Queensland town of Murgon. It also discusses how, as an Aboriginal, he had to overcome prejudices from people around him.

In July 2025, Renouf was charged with high-range drink driving after allegedly blowing nearly four times the legal limit. It is alleged Renouf returned a BAC of 0.197 per cent when he was taken to the Brisbane City Watchhouse for further tests. His licence was immediately suspended, and he was charged with one count of driving under the influence of liquor.
