= Matthew Ryan (rugby league) =

Australian rugby league footballer

Personal information
- Full name: Matthew Ryan
- Born: 15 September 1969 (age 56) Moree, New South Wales, Australia

Playing information
- Position: Fullback, Wing, Centre
Club
Years	Team	Pld	T	G	FG	P
1990–98	Canterbury Bulldogs	95	34	0	0	236
1999	North Qld Cowboys	9	3	0	0	12
	Total	104	37	0	0	248
Representative
Years	Team	Pld	T	G	FG	P
1994	NSW Country	1	0	0	0	0
1997	New South Wales (SL)	3	1	0	0	4
- Source: As of 23 October 2019

Matthew Ryan (born 15 September 1969) is an Australian former professional rugby league footballer who played most of his career with the Canterbury-Bankstown Bulldogs (1990 to 1998). Usually playing at centre, fullback, or on the wing, Ryan was a member of Canterbury's 1995 ARL premiership winning side. His brother, Mark Ryan, also played for the Canterbury club.

During the 1988 Great Britain Lions tour Ryan was selected to play at centre for a Northern NSW team that defeated the visitors at Tamworth. He commenced his first grade NSWRL premiership career with Sydney club, Canterbury-Bankstown Bulldogs in 1990. Ryan was a member of Canterbury's 1994 Grand Final-losing side as a reserve. The following season however, he and Canterbury-Bankstown won the 1995 ARL premiership grand final. In the 1997 Super League season Ryan was selected to represent New South Wales on three occasions in the Super League Tri-series, scoring a try. That year he was also the Telstra premiership's leading try-scorer. Ryan later left Canterbury to play in the 1999 NRL season for the North Queensland Cowboys. Ryan was not selected to play in the 1998 Grand Final, which the Bulldogs lost to the Brisbane Broncos.
