= Simon Gillies =

Australian rugby league footballer

Personal information
- Born: 4 December 1969 (age 55); Canterbury, New South Wales, Australia
- Height: 182 cm (6 ft 0 in)
- Weight: 99 kg (15 st 8 lb)

Playing information
- Position: , Second-row, Lock
Club
Years	Team	Pld	T	G	FG	P
1988–98	Canterbury Bulldogs	161	23	0	0	92
1999	Warrington Wolves	29	6	0	0	24
	Total	190	29	0	0	116
Representative
Years	Team	Pld	T	G	FG	P
1997	New South Wales (SL)	3	2	0	0	8
1992–93	NSW Country	2	0	0	0	0

Simon Gillies is an Australian former professional rugby league footballer who played in the 1980s and 1990s. An Australia national and New South Wales state representative forward, he played his club football in Sydney for the Canterbury-Bankstown Bulldogs (with whom he won the 1995 ARL Premiership), as well as in England for the Warrington Wolves. His older brother Ben Gillies also played for Canterbury-Bankstown.

== Playing career ==
Gillies made his first grade debut for Canterbury in the major semi final against Cronulla-Sutherland which Canterbury won 26–8 at the Sydney Football Stadium. Gillies was not selected in Canterbury's 1988 grand final team which defeated Balmain in the decider.

In 1993, Gillies played from the bench in Canterbury's preliminary final loss against eventual premiers the Brisbane Broncos. Gillies was selected to play for Canterbury-Bankstown from the reserve bench in their 1994 Grand Final loss to the Canberra Raiders. Gillies played as a second-row for Canterbury in their 1995 Grand Final victory over Manly-Warringah. He was named as Canterbury's replacement captain following Terry Lamb's retirement at the end of 1996. Gillies represented Australia at the 1996 Super League World Nines. In 1997 he was selected for the New South Wales rugby league team during the Super League Tri-series.

Gillies final season for Canterbury was in 1998. He played 14 games throughout the year for the club but did not play in the finals series or the 1998 NRL Grand Final loss to the Brisbane Broncos, however, he did finish his career with Canterbury on a high, scoring two tries in their reserve grade Grand Final victory over the Parramatta Eels 26–22. Canterbury-Bankstown came back from 22-0 down. Gillies was known for his toughness and heart in an 11-year career with his boyhood club. Gillies played a total of 227 games across all grades for Canterbury.
