= Super League Tri-series =

1997 rugby league football tournament

The Super League Tri-series was an international rugby league football tournament contested in 1997 between Queensland, New South Wales, and New Zealand representative rugby league teams. It was run by the breakaway Super League organisation as an alternative to the Australian Rugby League's traditional State of Origin series, with each of the two series involving exclusively players contracted to clubs of their respective League. New South Wales were overall winners of the Tri-series, defeating Queensland in the final.

New Zealand restricted their selections to players based in Australia and New Zealand and did not recognize the matches as international games.

== Results ==
=== Game 1 ===
Friday 11 April

New South Wales	38 – 10	Queensland
Tries: Andrew Ettingshausen (3); Ken Nagas (2); Greg Alexander; David Peachey; Goals: Ryan Girdler (5/7)		Tries: Peter Ryan; Wendell Sailor Goals: Mat Rogers (1/2)

Sydney Football Stadium, Sydney
Attendance: 26,731
Referee: Bill Harrigan
Player of the Match: Greg Alexander

=== Game 2 ===
Friday 9 May

New Zealand	12 – 26	Queensland
Tries: Stacey Jones; John Timu Goals: Gene Ngamu (2/2)		Tries: Tonie Carroll; Allan Langer; Mat Rogers; Kevin Walters; Shane Webcke; Goals: Mat Rogers (3/5)

Ericsson Stadium, Auckland
Attendance: 18,000
Referee: Graham Annesley
Player of the Match: Allan Langer

=== Game 3 ===
Wednesday 14 May

New South Wales	20 – 15	New Zealand
Tries: Simon Gillies (2); Ken Nagas (2); Goals: Ryan Girdler (2/4); Laurie Daley (0/1)		Tries: Ruben Wiki (2) Goals: Stacey Jones (3/4) Field Goals: Gene Ngamu (1)

Bruce Stadium, Canberra
Attendance: 13,836
Referee: Steve Clark

After New South Wales defeated Queensland on 11 April 1997 it was possible for New Zealand to make the final if they defeated New South Wales. This commercially disastrous final looked like becoming a reality when New Zealand winger Sean Hoppe scored a try in the dying minutes of the 14 May match against New South Wales, but the try was controversially disallowed.

=== Table ===
	Team	Played	Wins	Losses	Points
1	New South Wales	2	2	0	4
2	Queensland	2	1	1	2
3	New Zealand	2	0	2	0

=== Final ===
The Tri-series final was held on 19 May 1997, and won by New South Wales, who defeated Queensland 23–22 at ANZ Stadium in the longest-ever game of first class rugby league. After 80 minutes, the scores were locked at 18–18, and a further 20 minutes were played. At the end of this time, the scores were 22–22, and Queensland captain Allan Langer is said to have asked the referee, "Should we toss a coin to see who wins?" The game then moved into golden point extra time, and after 104 minutes, Noel Goldthorpe kicked a field goal for New South Wales, and won the match.

Despite the game being played in Brisbane, NSW were the home team as it was the Final of the series.

Monday 19 May

New South Wales	23 – 22 (gp)	Queensland
Tries: Brett Mullins (3); Matthew Ryan Goals: David Furner (3/4) Field Goals: Noel Goldthorpe (1)		Tries: Steve Renouf (2); Tonie Carroll; Michael Hancock; Goals: Mat Rogers (2/3); Darren Lockyer (1/2)

ANZ Stadium, Brisbane
Attendance: 35,570
Referee: Bill Harrigan

== Squads ==
=== New South Wales ===
Coach:Tim Sheens Assistant Coach: Craig Bellamy

Position	Game 1 (versus Qld)	Game 2 (versus NZ)	Game 3 (versus Qld)
Fullback	David Peachey		
Wing	Ken Nagas		
Centre	Andrew Ettingshausen		
Centre	Ryan Girdler		Matthew Ryan
Wing	Matthew Ryan	Brett Mullins	
Five-Eighth	Laurie Daley (c)		
Halfback	Greg Alexander	Noel Goldthorpe	
Prop	Glenn Lazarus		
Hooker	Craig Gower	Luke Priddis	Craig Gower
Prop	Rodney Howe	Ian Roberts	
Second Row	Sean Ryan	David Furner	
Second Row	Simon Gillies		
Lock	David Furner	Bradley Clyde	
Interchange	Matt Adamson	Danny Lee	Robbie Kearns
Interchange	Solomon Haumono		
Interchange	Robbie Ross	Scott Wilson	Robbie Ross
Interchange	Noel Goldthorpe	Matthew Ryan	Luke Priddis

=== New Zealand ===
The side was coached by Graeme Norton and he served as a selector alongside Frank Endacott and Gary Kemble.

Position	Game 1 (versus Qld)	Game 2 (versus NSW)
Fullback	Anthony Swann	
Wing	Sean Hoppe	
Centre	Tea Ropati	
Centre	Ruben Wiki	
Wing	Richie Barnett	
Five-Eighth	Gene Ngamu	
Halfback	Stacey Jones	
Prop	Quentin Pongia	
Hooker	Syd Eru	
Prop	Joe Vagana	
Second Row	Tony Iro	Stephen Kearney
Second Row	Stephen Kearney	Tyran Smith
Lock	Tawera Nikau	
Interchange	John Timu	
Interchange	Brady Malam	Marc Ellis
Interchange	Tyran Smith	Brady Malam
Interchange	Marc Ellis	Tony Iro

=== Queensland ===
Queensland were coached by Wayne Bennett.

Position	Game 1 (versus NSW)	Game 2 (versus NZ)	Game 3 (versus NSW)
Fullback	Julian O'Neill	Darren Lockyer	
Wing	Mat Rogers		
Centre	Steve Renouf	Darren Smith	Steve Renouf
Centre	Geoff Bell	Tonie Carroll	
Wing	Wendell Sailor		
Five-Eighth	Kevin Walters		
Halfback	Allan Langer (c)		
Prop	Brad Thorn		
Hooker	Steve Walters		
Prop	Andrew Gee	Craig Greenhill	Owen Cunningham
Second Row	Owen Cunningham		Peter Ryan
Second Row	Gorden Tallis		
Lock	Darren Smith	Peter Ryan	Darren Smith
Interchange	Peter Ryan	Michael Hancock	
Interchange	Chris McKenna	Kevin Campion	
Interchange	Paul Green		
Interchange	Shane Webcke		

== Statistics ==
=== Try scorers ===
Tries Scored	Player
4	Ken Nagas (NSW)
3	Andrew Ettingshausen (NSW), Brett Mullins (NSW), Tonie Carroll (Qld)
2	David Peachey (NSW), Simon Gillies (NSW), Ruben Wiki (NZ), Steve Renouf (Qld)
1	Shane Webcke (Qld), Greg Alexander (NSW), Kevin Walters (Qld), Allan Langer (Qld), Mat Rogers (Qld), Stacey Jones (NZ), Wendell Sailor (Qld), Gene Ngamu (NZ), Peter Ryan (Qld), Michael Hancock (Qld), Matthew Ryan (NSW), John Timu (NZ)

== See also ==
- 1997 State of Origin series
- Super League (Australia)
