= 1991 Brisbane Broncos season =

Coordinates: 27°27′53″S 153°0′34″E

Seasons
- 1990 1992

The 1991 Brisbane Broncos season was the fourth in the club's history. They competed in the NSWRL's 1991 Winfield Cup premiership and failed to reach the finals, finishing 7th (out of 16).

Three Broncos players, Paul Hauff, Willie Carne and Andrew Gee were selected to make their international debuts for Australia in 1991.

== Season summary ==
In the 1991 NSWRL season the Broncos again won the Panasonic Cup competition. In round 16 they were kept scoreless by the Manly-Warringah Sea Eagles, the first team ever to do so. Steve Renouf became the first Bronco to score four tries in a match in round 20. However they didn't perform consistently enough during the season, only gaining momentum in August, when they won their last five matches straight. The club finished the season in seventh place, missing the finals despite winning their last 5 games consecutively and finishing with the second best points scored total in the League.

== Match results ==
Round	Opponent	Result	Bro.	Opp.	Date	Venue	Crowd	Position
1	Manly-Warringah Sea Eagles	Win	12	2	15 Mar	Lang Park	25,126	4/16
2	St George Dragons	Loss	12	20	23 Mar	Kogarah Oval	6,829	10/16
3	Canberra Raiders	Win	26	12	31 Mar	Lang Park	23,801	6/16
4	Parramatta Eels	Win	26	13	5 Apr	Parramatta Stadium	13,009	4/16
5	North Sydney Bears	Loss	16	21	13 Apr	North Sydney Oval	9,478	7/16
6	Gold Coast Seagulls	Win	30	4	21 Apr	Lang Park	23,849	5/16
7	Western Suburbs Magpies	Loss	16	17	26 Apr	Campbelltown Sports Ground	10,357	6/16
8*	Eastern Suburbs Roosters	Loss	16	24	11 May	Lang Park	13,156	8/16
9	Balmain Tigers	Loss	4	14	19 May	Leichhardt Oval	7,023	11/16
10*	Cronulla-Sutherland Sharks	Win	40	2	31 May	Lang Park	17,546	8/16
11	Canterbury-Bankstown Bulldogs	Loss	18	20	9 Jun	Lang Park	18,922	11/16
12*	South Sydney Rabbitohs	Win	36	20	16 Jun	Sydney Football Stadium	12,698	9/16
13	Penrith Panthers	Win	20	12	23 Jun	Lang Park	26,165	8/16
14	Illawarra Steelers	Loss	2	19	30 Jun	Wollongong	15,246	9/16
15	Newcastle Knights	Win	20	10	5 Jul	Newcastle ISC	22,682	8/16
16	Manly-Warringah Sea Eagles	Loss	0	26	14 Jul	Brookvale Oval	18,689	10/16
17	St George Dragons	Loss	26	28	20 Jul	Lang Park	18,367	10/16
18	Canberra Raiders	Win	18	8	28 Jul	Bruce Stadium	17,245	10/16
19	Parramatta Eels	Win	40	16	4 Aug	Lang Park	14,906	9/16
20	North Sydney Bears	Win	44	6	9 Aug	Lang Park	17,622	8/16
21	Gold Coast Seagulls	Win	20	18	17 Aug	Seagulls Stadium	12,620	8/16
22	Western Suburbs Magpies	Win	28	14	24 Aug	Lang Park	14,628	7/16

*Game following a State of Origin match

== Ladder ==
	Team	Pld	W	D	L	PF	PA	PD	Pts
1	Penrith	22	17	1	4	483	250	+233	35
2	Manly-Warringah	22	14	1	7	391	299	+92	29
3	North Sydney	22	14	1	7	345	303	+42	29
4	Canberra	22	14	0	8	452	327	+125	28
5	Canterbury-Bankstown	22	13	1	8	424	374	+50	27
6	Western Suburbs	22	13	1	8	359	311	+48	27
7	Brisbane Broncos	22	13	0	9	470	326	+144	26
8	Illawarra	22	12	1	9	451	291	+160	25
9	St. George	22	11	3	8	388	320	+68	25
10	Cronulla-Sutherland	22	8	3	11	384	441	-57	19
11	Eastern Suburbs	22	9	1	12	337	487	-150	19
12	Balmain	22	8	1	13	351	412	-61	17
13	Newcastle Knights	22	6	3	13	308	424	-116	15
14	South Sydney	22	7	0	15	370	513	-143	14
15	Parramatta	22	6	0	16	351	534	-183	12
16	Gold Coast Seagulls	22	2	1	19	240	492	-252	5

== Scorers ==
Player	Tries	Goals	FG	Points
Terry Matterson	0	38/59	0	76
Steve Renouf	15	0	0	60
Michael Hancock	11	0/1	0	44
Bob Conway	0	16/30	0	32
Chris Johns	8	0	0	32
Willie Carne	6	0	0	24
Trevor Gillmeister	6	0	0	24
Dale Shearer	5	2/6	0	24
Paul Hauff	5	0	0	20
Allan Langer	3	3/6	0	18
Gene Miles	4	0/3	0	16
Julian O'Neill	2	4/8	0	16
Brett Plowman	4	0	0	16
Willie Morganson	3	0	0	12
Kevin Walters	3	0	0	12
Kerrod Walters	3	0	0	12
Andrew Gee	2	0	0	8
Brett Le Man	2	0	0	8
Tony Currie	1	0	0	4
Greg Dowling	1	0	0	4
Mark Hohn	1	0	0	4
Andrew Tessmann	1	0	0	4

== Honours ==
=== League ===
- Nil

=== Club ===
- Player of the year: Trevor Gillmeister
- Rookie of the year: Julian O'Neill
- Back of the year: Allan Langer
- Forward of the year: Andrew Gee
- Club man of the year: Andrew Gee
