= 1995 ARL season =

Rugby league competition

1995 Australian Rugby League
- Teams: 20
- Premiers: Sydney Bulldogs (7th title)
- Minor premiers: Manly Sea Eagles (7th title)
- Matches played: 229
- Points scored: 5,370
- Average attendance: 14,642
- Total attendance: 3,352,927
- Top points scorer: Matthew Ridge (257)
- Wooden spoon: North Queensland (1st spoon)
- Rothmans Medal: Paul Green
- Top try-scorer: Steve Menzies (22)

The 1995 ARL premiership was the 88th season of professional rugby league football in Australia, and the first to be run by the Australian Rugby League following the hand-over of the Premiership's administration by the New South Wales Rugby League. For the first time since 1988, the Premiership expanded again, with the addition of two new clubs from Queensland:

- North Queensland Cowboys, based in Townsville
- South Queensland Crushers, based in Brisbane.

For the first time ever, clubs were also added from outside the borders of New South Wales and Queensland, and indeed, Australia:

- Western Reds (later Perth Reds), based in Perth
- Auckland Warriors (later NZ Warriors), based in Auckland

This saw a total of twenty teams, the largest number in the League's history, compete during the regular season for the J J Giltinan Shield, which was followed by a series of play-off finals between the top eight teams that culminated in a grand final for the Winfield Cup between the re-branded Sydney Bulldogs and Manly.

The 1995 season also saw the first major consequences of the Super League war, with the ARL's refusal to select almost all players (Note: Excluding Canberra, most of these clubs contained a handful of players who did not sign with the new league or attempted to defect back to the ARL, of whom the Broncos' Gavin Allen, the Reds' Brad Mackay, Penrith's Brad Fittler and Matt Sing, and Canterbury's Brett Dallas, Jason Smith and Dean Pay did play in the State of Origin series, while Cronulla's Aaron Raper played in the October Test matches.) from the eight clubs who had aligned with News Ltd's proposed Super League (Note: These included every club that had won the premiership since 1988 — the Bulldogs in 1988, Canberra in 1989, 1990 and 1994, Penrith in 1991 and Brisbane in 1992 and 1993) for State of Origin or Test matches, including the 1995 Rugby League World Cup.

== Season summary ==
1995 would prove to be a year of massive change for the League. In addition to the introduction of four new teams, it was the last year of the premiership's association with Rothmans and the Winfield brand and consequently the final year that clubs competed for the Winfield Cup.

There had been a cloud over the league for some time in the form of rumours and speculation about the Super League, but the ensuing dispute was more extensive than almost any commenters and analysts had predicted. The subsequent Super League war would have massive impacts on the sport in Australia and would substantially harm the league's popular support and grassroots structures.

The 1995 season was played in front of a background of legal actions which did large damage to interpersonal relations within the league, with players and managers jockeying for position. Players who had signed with the new Super League venture were forbidden by the ARL from participating in the 1995 State of Origin. Selectors from New South Wales and Queensland were limited to selecting players only from ARL-aligned clubs, plus certain defectors from Super League.

The usual twenty-two regular season rounds were played from March till August. However the large number of teams meant a resulting top eight would battle it out in the finals rather than the usual five. These were Manly, Canberra, Brisbane, Cronulla, Newcastle, Sydney Bulldogs, St. George and North Sydney (who made it in due to Auckland being penalised for an interchange infringement). In addition to the premiership, there was also the 1995 Trans-Tasman Test series between the Australian Rugby League's and New Zealand Rugby League's national teams.

Cronulla-Sutherland's halfback Paul Green was awarded the 1995 Rothmans Medal. The Dally M Award was given to Canberra's five-eighth, Laurie Daley who was also named Rugby League Week's player of the year. Manly-Warringah's Steve Menzies became the first forward for 50 years to top the season's try-scoring list, while his teammate Matthew Ridge set a club point scoring record of 257 points (Note: 11 tries, 106 goals and 1 field goal) to be the league's leading point scorer for the year.

By the end of the regular season, the ARL's inaugural 20-team competition had set a new record for aggregate match attendances of 3,061,338.

=== Advertising ===
1995 marked the final year of the New South Wales Rugby League's sponsorship arrangement with Rothmans and Winfield due to the federal government's blanket ban on cigarette advertising in Australia effective from 1 January 1996. It was consequently the final year of a seven-year association with Tina Turner and the end of an era in Australian sports marketing.

With a lock-up-your-daughters, kick-off your suspenders, red-blooded Tina Turner marketing blitz, the ARL had stuck it right up the other footy codes.

— Ray Martin, 1999

As in 1994 the New South Wales Rugby League and its advertising agency Hertz Walpole returned to the original 1989 recording of The Best by Turner to underscore the season launch advertisement. Footage from the studio bluescreen shoot taken during Turner's 1993 Sydney visit was used in the final advertisements. The enduring images are of Turner performing the song on an elevated stage in front of the fluttering banners of the 20 clubs that would participate in 1995's expanded competition.

=== Teams ===
When the Australian Rugby League began taking bids for additional teams to begin playing in 1995, it was expected that only two teams would enter. Auckland were the first club to be accepted, with the final place being fought for by South Queensland, North Queensland and Perth. The Australian Rugby League later announced that all three clubs had been accepted, taking the number of teams from 16 in 1994 to 20 in 1995, the highest it had ever been and would ever be.

With the addition of the Auckland Warriors, North Queensland Cowboys, South Queensland Crushers and Western Reds the 1995 season involved an unprecedented twenty clubs, including five Sydney-based foundation teams, another six from Sydney, one from Newcastle, one from Wollongong, two from Brisbane, one from Gold Coast, one from Townsville, one from Auckland, one from Canberra and one from Perth, who all contested the premiership, making it the largest competition in terms of participation in Australia's history.

We haven't brought these teams into the Winfield Cup just to see them dropped after one season

— Australian Rugby League boss, Ken Arthurson, 1995

With the storm that would be the Super League war already brewing in the background, three clubs based in Sydney suburbs, in an effort to position themselves favourably as battle lines were being drawn up, re-branded themselves for the 1995 season with less geographically distinct names: the Balmain Tigers became the 'Sydney Tigers', the Canterbury-Bankstown Bulldogs became the 'Sydney Bulldogs', and the Eastern Suburbs Roosters became the 'Sydney City Roosters'.

=== Teams ===
Team	Nickname	Colours	Jersey	Season	Home Ground	Coach	Captain
Auckland	Warriors			1st season	Mt. Smart Stadium	Ron Hilditch	Paul Dunn
Brisbane	Broncos			8th season	QEII Stadium	Wayne Bennett	Allan Langer
Canberra	Raiders			14th season	Bruce Stadium	Tim Sheens	Ricky Stuart
Cronulla	Sharks			29th season	Endeavour Field	Norm Provan	Greg Pierce
Gold Coast	Seagulls			8th season	Seagulls Stadium	John Harvey	Craig Coleman
Illawarra	Steelers			14th season	Wollongong Stadium	Graham Murray → Allan Fitzgibbon	John Cross
Manly	Sea Eagles			49th season	Brookvale Oval	Bob Fulton	Geoff Toovey
Newcastle	Knights			8th season	Marathon Stadium	Malcolm "Mal" Reilly	Mark Sargent → Paul Harragon
North Queensland	Cowboys			1st season	Stockland Stadium	Grant Bell	Various
North Sydney	Bears			71st season	North Sydney Oval	Pater Louis	Jason Taylor
Parramatta	Eels			49th season	Parramatta Stadium	Ron Hilditch	Paul Dunn
Penrith	Panthers			12th season	Penrith Stadium	Royce Simmons	John Cartwright
St. George	Dragons			58th season	Kogarah Oval	Harry Bath	Steve Edge
South Queensland	Crushers			1st season	Lang Park	Bill Gardner → Bob Lindner	Mario Fenech → Trevor Gillmeister
South Sydney	Rabbitohs			71st season	Sydney Football Stadium	Jack Gibson	Paul Sait → Darrell Bampton
Sydney (Canterbury-Bankstown)	Bulldogs			44th season	Parramatta Stadium	Ted Glossop	George Peponis
Sydney City (East. Subs.)	Roosters			71st season	Sydney Football Stadium	Phil Gould	Sean Garlick
Sydney (Balmain)	Tigers			71st season	Parramatta Stadium	Ron Willey	Trevor Ryan
Western	Reds			1st season	WACA Ground	Peter Mulholland	Brad Mackay
West. Sub.	Magpies			71st season	Lidcombe Oval	Roy Masters	Tom Raudonikis

=== Ladder ===
	Team	Pld	W	D	L	PF	PA	PD	Pts
1	Manly Sea Eagles	22	20	0	2	687	248	+439	40
2	Canberra Raiders	22	20	0	2	634	255	+379	40
3	Brisbane Broncos	22	17	0	5	600	364	+236	34
4	Cronulla Sharks	22	16	0	6	516	287	+229	32
5	Newcastle Knights	22	15	0	7	549	396	+153	30
6	Sydney Bulldogs (Canterbury-Bankstown Bulldogs) (P)	22	14	0	8	468	352	+116	28
7	St. George Dragons	22	13	0	9	583	382	+201	26
8	North Sydney Bears	22	11	2	9	542	331	+211	24
9	Sydney City Roosters (Eastern Suburbs Roosters)	22	12	0	10	466	406	+60	24
10	Auckland Warriors	22	13	0	9	544	493	+51	24
11	Western Reds	22	11	0	11	361	549	-188	22
12	Illawarra Steelers	22	10	1	11	519	431	+88	21
13	Western Suburbs Magpies	22	10	0	12	459	534	-75	20
14	Penrith Panthers	22	9	0	13	481	484	-3	18
15	Sydney Tigers (Balmain Tigers)	22	7	0	15	309	591	-282	14
16	South Queensland Crushers	22	6	1	15	303	502	-199	13
17	Gold Coast Seagulls	22	4	1	17	350	628	-278	9
18	South Sydney Rabbitohs	22	4	1	17	319	686	-367	9
19	Parramatta Eels	22	3	0	19	310	690	-380	6
20	North Queensland Cowboys	22	2	0	20	269	660	-391	4

- Auckland Warriors were stripped of 2 competition points due to exceeding the replacement limit in round 3.

=== Ladder progression ===
- Numbers highlighted in green indicate that the team finished the round inside the top 8.
- Numbers highlighted in blue indicates the team finished first on the ladder in that round.
- Numbers highlighted in red indicates the team finished in last place on the ladder in that round

	Team	1	2	3	4	5	6	7	8	9	10	11	12	13	14	15	16	17	18	19	20	21	22
1	Manly	2	4	6	8	10	12	14	16	18	20	22	24	26	28	30	30	32	32	34	36	38	40
2	Canberra	2	4	6	8	10	12	14	16	18	18	20	22	24	26	26	28	30	32	34	36	38	40
3	Brisbane	2	4	6	8	10	12	14	14	16	18	18	18	20	22	22	22	24	26	28	30	32	34
4	Cronulla	0	2	2	4	6	8	8	10	12	12	14	16	16	16	18	20	22	24	26	28	30	32
5	Newcastle	2	4	6	8	10	12	14	16	18	18	20	22	24	24	26	28	28	28	30	30	30	30
6	Sydney Bulldogs	2	4	6	6	8	8	8	10	10	12	12	14	14	16	18	20	20	22	24	24	26	28
7	St George	0	0	0	2	2	2	4	4	6	8	8	8	10	12	12	14	16	18	20	22	24	26
8	North Sydney	2	4	4	6	6	8	8	8	8	8	10	10	12	14	16	16	16	18	20	22	23	24
9	Sydney City	0	2	2	4	4	6	8	8	10	12	14	14	14	14	14	16	16	18	20	22	22	24
10	Auckland	0	0	0	0	0	2	4	6	6	8	10	10	12	14	16	18	20	22	22	24	24	24
11	Western	2	2	4	4	4	6	6	8	8	8	8	10	10	12	14	14	16	18	18	20	22	22
12	Illawarra	0	2	2	4	6	6	7	7	7	7	7	9	9	9	9	11	13	15	15	17	19	21
13	Western Suburbs	2	2	2	4	6	6	8	10	10	12	14	16	16	18	18	18	20	20	20	20	20	20
14	Penrith	2	2	4	4	4	4	4	4	6	8	10	12	12	14	16	16	16	16	16	16	16	18
15	Sydney Tigers	2	2	4	4	4	4	6	6	6	8	8	10	12	12	12	12	12	12	12	12	14	14
16	South Qld	0	0	0	0	2	2	3	5	5	7	7	7	9	9	9	11	11	11	13	13	13	13
17	Gold Coast	0	0	2	2	2	4	4	4	4	4	4	4	6	6	6	6	8	8	8	8	8	9
18	South Sydney	0	0	0	0	2	2	2	2	4	4	4	4	4	4	6	8	8	8	8	8	9	9
19	Parramatta	0	2	2	2	2	2	2	2	4	4	6	6	6	6	6	6	6	6	6	6	6	6
20	North Qld	0	0	0	0	0	0	0	2	2	2	2	2	2	2	4	4	4	4	4	4	4	4

== Finals ==
A new finals system involving eight teams instead of the previous five was introduced for the expanded 1995 competition. The final eight was to be made of four clubs who would ultimately prove loyal to the Australian Rugby League (Manly, St. George, North Sydney and Newcastle) and four clubs who would join Super League's rebel ranks (Sydney Bulldogs, Canberra, Brisbane and Cronulla Sharks). The Grand Final was played out by a team from each faction, being the Manly-Warringah Sea Eagles and the Sydney Bulldogs.

Home	Score	Away	Match Information
Home	Score	Away	Date and Time	Venue	Referee	Crowd
Quarter-finals
Newcastle Knights	20–10	North Sydney Bears	1 September 1995	Parramatta Stadium	David Manson	14,174
Canberra Raiders	14–8	Brisbane Broncos	2 September 1995	Suncorp Stadium	Kelvin Jeffes	40,187
Sydney Bulldogs	12–8	St. George Dragons	2 September 1995	Sydney Football Stadium	Eddie Ward	26,835
Manly Sea Eagles	24–20	Cronulla Sharks	3 September 1995	Sydney Football Stadium	Paul McBlane	32,795
Semi-finals
Cronulla Sharks	18–19	Newcastle Knights	9 September 1995	Sydney Football Stadium	Eddie Ward	26,061
Brisbane Broncos	10–24	Sydney Bulldogs	10 September 1995	Sydney Football Stadium	David Manson	34,087
Preliminary finals
Canberra Raiders	6–25	Sydney Bulldogs	16 September 1995	Sydney Football Stadium	Eddie Ward	36,894
Manly Sea Eagles	12–4	Newcastle Knights	17 September 1995	Sydney Football Stadium	David Manson	38,874
Grand final
Manly Sea Eagles	4–17	Sydney Bulldogs	24 September 1995	Sydney Football Stadium	Eddie Ward	41,127

=== Chart ===
Qualifying and elimination finals
3 Sept, Sydney Football Stadium
1	Manly Sea Eagles	24
4	Cronulla Sharks	20
1 Sept, Parramatta Stadium
5	Newcastle Knights	20
8	North Sydney Bears	10
2 Sept, Sydney Football Stadium
6	Sydney Bulldogs	12
7	St. George Dragons	8
2 Sept, Suncorp Stadium
2	Canberra Raiders	14
3	Brisbane Broncos	8

Semi-finals
9 Sept, Sydney Football Stadium
Cronulla Sharks	18
Newcastle Knights	19
10 Sept, Sydney Football Stadium
Brisbane Broncos	10
Sydney Bulldogs	24

Preliminary finals
17 Sept, Sydney Football Stadium
Manly Sea Eagles	12
Newcastle Knights	4
16 Sept, Sydney Football Stadium
Canberra Raiders	6
Sydney Bulldogs	25

Grand final
24 Sept, Sydney Football Stadium
Manly Sea Eagles	4
Sydney Bulldogs	17

== Grand Final ==
1995 ARL Grand Final
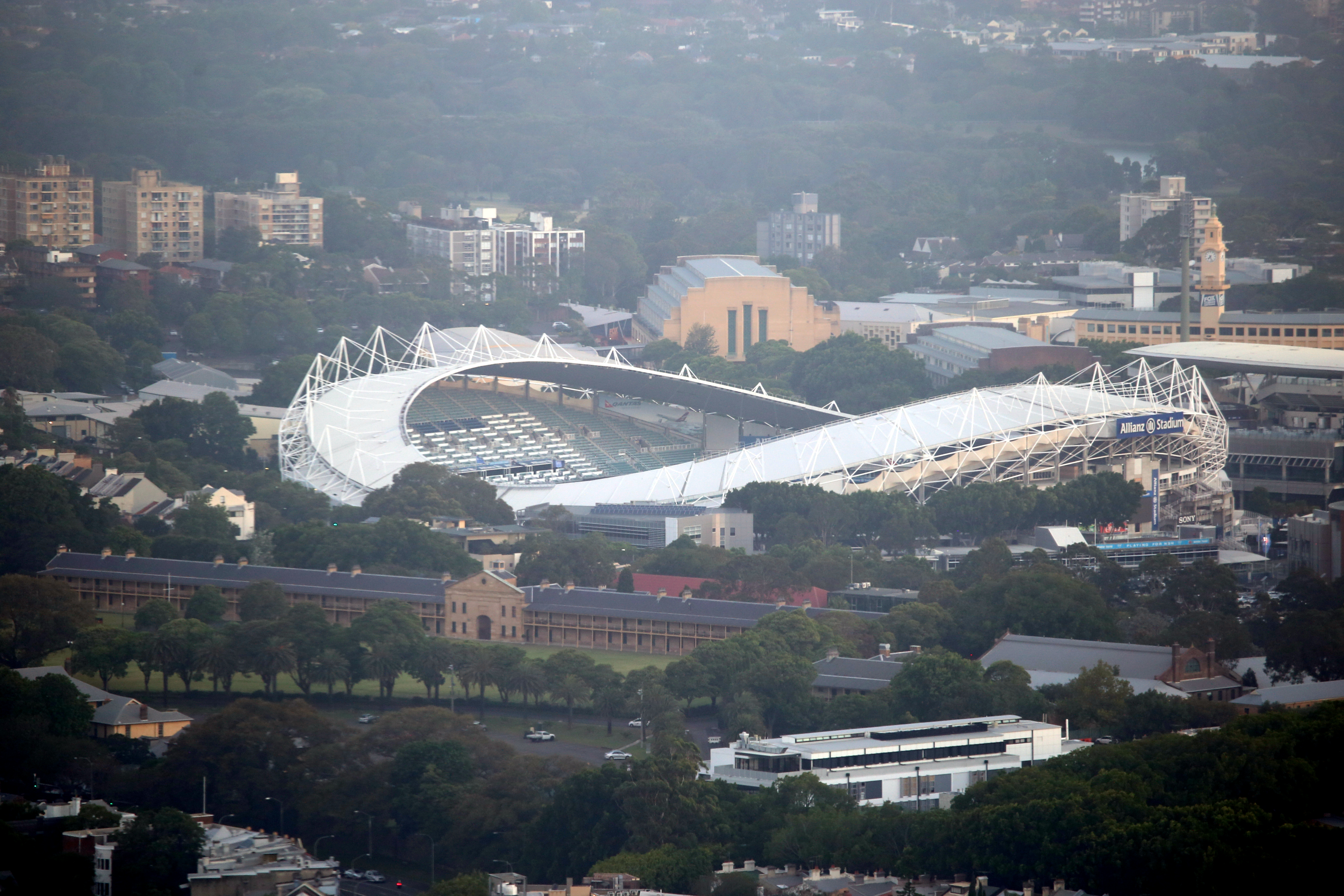
- An aerial view of the Sydney Football Stadium, where the match was played

Manly Sea Eagles	Sydney Bulldogs
4	17
	1	2	Total
MAN	4	0	4
SYB	6	11	17
- Date: 24 September 1995
- Stadium: Sydney Football Stadium
- Location: Sydney
- Clive Churchill Medal: Jim Dymock (SYB)
- Australian National anthem: Julie Anthony
- Referee: Eddie Ward
- Attendance: 41,127

Broadcast partners
- Broadcasters: Nine Network
- Commentators: Ken Sutcliffe (host); Ray Warren; Peter Sterling; Paul Vautin Phil Gould; Steve Roach (sideline)

=== Teams ===
Twelve Bulldogs players remained from the squad that played in the 1994 Grand Final. Initially selected in the starting line-up, winger Brett Dallas missed the decider due to a hamstring injury sustained in the preliminary final. Des Hasler and Cliff Lyons both had previous Grand Final experience for Manly, playing in the 1987 Grand Final, while Manly prop David Gillespie had played in the Bulldogs’ 1988 premiership win. Manly fullback Matthew Ridge started the match under an injury cloud, having sustained a rib injury during the finals series.

Team details
Manly Warringah Sea Eagles		Position	Sydney Bulldogs
Name	Number	Position	Number	Name
Matthew Ridge	1	Fullback	1	Rod Silva
Craig Hancock	2	Wing	18	Jason Williams
Danny Moore	3	Centre	3	John Timu
Terry Hill	4	Centre	4	Matthew Ryan
John Hopoate	5	Wing	5	Daryl Halligan
Cliff Lyons	6	Five eighth	6	Terry Lamb (c)
Geoff Toovey (c)	7	Half back	7	Craig Polla-Mounter
David Gillespie	8	Prop forward	8	Darren Britt
Des Hasler	9	Hooker	9	Jason Hetherington
Mark Carroll	10	Prop forward	10	Dean Pay
Steve Menzies	11	Second row	11	Steve Price
Ian Roberts	12	Second row	12	Simon Gillies
Nik Kosef	13	Lock forward	13	Jim Dymock
Owen Cunningham	14	Interchange	25	Jason Smith
Daniel Gartner	15	Interchange	27	Glen Hughes
Solomon Haumono	16	Interchange	28	Mitch Newton
Bob Fulton		Coach		Chris Anderson

=== Entertainment ===
Julie Anthony performed Advance Australia Fair before the match. The half time entertainment included a surreal commercial presentation from competition sponsor Optus Vision in which a large black television was left swinging above the turf until one side collapsed releasing a shower of balloons to fall to the ground. The mishap delayed the start of the second half of the match. Optus Vision CEO Geoff Cousins proclaiming "what happened was supposed to happen."

=== Match details ===
Having finished in sixth place at the end of the regular season, the Bulldogs managed a history-making finals surge, winning three sudden death matches to make the Grand Final.

The match kicked off in sunny conditions, with the forecast showers not eventuating.

An early chance to open the scoring from a penalty goal attempt was missed by Bulldogs goalkicker Daryl Halligan in the fourth minute, his kick falling short from approximately 39 metres from the posts. A few minutes later with Manly on the attack, Bulldogs captain Terry Lamb was sent to the sin bin following a professional foul. From the resulting penalty, Matthew Ridge converted his attempt at goal to give Manly a 2–0 advantage.

The Bulldogs scrambled in defence and were able to keep out Manly while down to 12-men. Following Lamb's return they were able to level the scores following a penalty against Manly wing John Hopoate. Following an error by Terry Hill that gave the Bulldogs field position, Bulldogs lock forward Jim Dymock sparked an attack with his around-the-corner pass to Simon Gillies not ruled forward by the match officials, Gillies offloaded to Steve Price to score the first try of the Grand Final. Manly were able to cut the margin ten minutes from the break when Ridge converted a penalty goal attempt from 36 metres.

It had been a frantic and chaotic first half contest dominated by defence, with the Bulldogs ahead at half-time 6–4.

It was an erratic ten minutes to start the second half, with both teams guilty of handling errors. Then the biggest controversy of the match unfolded. The Bulldogs extended their lead to 10–4 when Glen Hughes scored a try from what appeared to be the seventh tackle in attack. Dymock and Lamb engineering the play for Dean Pay to bounce a looping pass to Hughes to score the try.

Chasing the match, further Manly errors gave the Bulldogs field position, with Lamb slotting a field goal in the 69th minute. They were denied a try a couple of minutes later when Matthew Ryan reached to ground the ball over the line, only for the referee to rule a knock-on. They wouldn't be denied a final try through Rod Silva in the final minutes, the fullback running in support of John Timu to score, again with a suspicion of a forward pass.

The Bulldogs had scored 11 unanswered points in the second half to secure the club's seventh premiership title and their first of the decade. The Bulldogs won despite losing the scrum count 3–5 and the penalty count 9–10. Manly's 22–3 season win–loss record remains the best not to have secured the premiership. Coach Chris Anderson stating "we got away to a good start in the second half, but Manly can pull a try out of anything and I wasn't certain we'd won until Silva put the ball down over the line with a few minutes left." Manly stalwart Cliff Lyons dubbed the match "our worst performance of the year by far."

At game's end Lamb enjoyed the rare honour of celebrating as a retiring victorious skipper, although he surprisingly returned for the 1996 season. Lamb meanwhile had given his premiership winners' medal to injured winger Brett Dallas during the victory lap.

The performance of Eddie Ward, refereeing his NSWRL/ARL first grand final (Ward had previously officiated in Brisbane Rugby League grand finals including the infamous 1990 decider), was subject to some post match controversy. Rugby League Week commented:

Two of Canterbury's three tries appeared to have resulted from borderline passes, another came on the seventh tackle, and a fourth – which in fact was a fair try – was disallowed.

Despite the controversy, most pundits agreed that the better team ended up winning.

=== Scoreboard ===
1995 ARL Winfield Cup Grand Final

Sunday, 24 September
15:00 AEST (UTC+10)

Manly Warringah Sea Eagles	4 – 17	Sydney Bulldogs
Goals: 2 Ridge pen 7', pen 29' (2/2)	1st: 4–6; 2nd: 0–11	Tries: 3 Price 21'; Hughes 61'; Silva 78'; Goals: 2 Halligan pen 17', 78' (2/5); Field goals: 1 Lamb 69'; Sin bin: Lamb (yellow card) 6' to 16'

Sydney Football Stadium, Sydney
Attendance: 41,127
Referee: Eddie Ward
Touch judges: Martin Weekes, Kevin Russell
In-goal judges: Tom Peet, John McCormack
Clive Churchill Medal: Jim Dymock (Sydney Bulldogs)

=== Other match ===
Newcastle Knights won the reserve grade Grand Final 22–10 against Cronulla. The Knights opened the scoring in the 13th minute through John Carlaw, before halfback Brett Kimmorley scored two tries in the second half, including a 90-metre intercept try. The win was the club's first premiership in any competition.

=== Title and the Sydney Bulldogs name ===
After a Grand Final appearance the previous season in which they lost to the Canberra Raiders, the Bulldogs rebranded from the Canterbury-Bankstown Bulldogs to the Sydney Bulldogs in 1995. This short-lived rebrand saw the club capture its seventh title in its first season under the new name, before it was altered to Canterbury Bulldogs in 1997 by Super League, changed again to Bulldogs RLFC in the 2000s and eventually reverted to its original name in 2010.

== Player statistics ==
The following statistics are as of the conclusion of Round 22.

Top 5 point scorers

Points	Player	Tries	Goals	Field Goals
239	Matthew Ridge	10	99	1
192	David Furner	10	76	0
190	Daryl Halligan	12	71	0
186	Julian O'Neill	8	76	2
184	Mat Rogers	13	66	0

Top 5 try scorers

Tries	Player
21	Steve Menzies
20	John Hopoate
19	Sean Hoppe
16	Jamie Ainscough
15	Jason Croker
15	Steve Renouf

Top 5 goal scorers

Goals	Player
99	Matthew Ridge
83	Jason Taylor
78	Andrew Johns
76	David Furner
76	Julian O'Neill

== See also ==
- 1995 State of Origin series
- Super League war
