= Craig Greenhill =

Australia international rugby league footballer

Personal information
- Full name: Craig Greenhill
- Born: 14 February 1972 (age 54) Queensland, Australia

Playing information
- Height: 186 cm (6 ft 1 in)
- Weight: 110 kg (17 st 5 lb)
- Position: Second-row, Prop
Club
Years	Team	Pld	T	G	FG	P
1994–98	Cronulla Sharks	55	4	0	0	16
1999–01	Penrith Panthers	61	0	0	0	0
2002–03	Hull F.C.	60	3	1	0	12
2004	Castleford Tigers	28	1	0	0	4
	Total	204	8	1	0	32
Representative
Years	Team	Pld	T	G	FG	P
1996–00	Queensland	6	0	0	0	0
1997	Queensland (SL)	1	0	0	0	0
1997	Australia (SL)	3	0	0	0	0

Craig Greenhill (born 14 February 1972) is an Australian former professional rugby league footballer. He represented Queensland Maroons in State of Origin, as a second-row.

== Playing career ==
Greenhill made his first grade debut for Cronulla in round 2 1995 against rival St. George at Kogarah Oval. Greenhill played in Cronulla's semi-final defeat against the Newcastle Knights that year.

In the 1996 ARL season, Greenhill played in Cronulla's preliminary final loss against Manly-Warringah which finished 0–24 at the Sydney Football Stadium. The following year in 1997, Cronulla joined the rival Super League competition during the Super League war.

In the 1997 post season, Greenhill was selected to play for Australia from the interchange bench in two matches of the Super League Test series against Great Britain.

Greenhill played in Cronulla's grand final defeat against the Brisbane Broncos. Greenhill then departed Cronulla at the end of 1998 and signed with Penrith.

In the 2000 NRL season, Penrith finished 5th after enjoying one of their best seasons since winning the premiership in 1991. Greenhill played in both finals games for Penrith which ended in defeat. Greenhill's final year in the NRL as a player came in the 2001 NRL season where Penrith finished last on the table. His final game was in round 26 2001 where Penrith were defeated 18–60 by Newcastle who would go on to win the premiership that season.

After leaving Penrith, Greenhill finished his career in England with Super League teams Hull F.C. and Castleford Tigers (Heritage No. 805).

== Trivia ==
Craig Greenhill was the first player to be sent off in State of Origin football.
Appeared in Conan the Barbarian as an extra; a young boy in Conan's tribe. Greenhill is attempting to become a golf professional in the senior ranks-he will be eligible in 2022.
