= Super League Test series =

Rugby league series

The Super League Test series was a rugby three-test match series between the Great Britain Lions and Super League's Australian national team held during November 1997 in England. Named the British Gas Test series due to sponsorship from Centrica's British Gas brand, it went to a decider in the third test that was won by Australia.

== Background ==
The Australian side consisted only of players from the 1997 Telstra Cup season (which was run by the Super League (SL)), with none from the 1997 Optus Cup season (which was run by the Australian Rugby League (ARL), who continue to disregard the series and do not count its matches in their records). England's Rugby Football League, who have been aligned with the Super League since 1995, does count the series' games as genuine test matches in their player records.

Coming off the disaster of the Lions 1996 Oceania tour, when the team won its tests against Papua New Guinea and Fiji, but lost all 3 tests against New Zealand and indeed did not even win a game on the New Zealand leg of the tour, the Lions were looking for redemption. The British team were also attempting to win their first series against Australia since 1970 and their first home series against Australia since 1959. Lions fullback/winger Jason Robinson was the only player from both teams who was not a Super League aligned, player having signed an ARL contract in 1995 at the height of the Super League war. Robinson had played for a Rest of the World team in a test against the Australian Kangaroos (ARL) earlier in 1997. Although contracted to the ARL, they did not object to Robinson's selection for Great Britain. Robinson had been controversially left off Great Britain's 1996 Oceania tour by the RFL due to his ARL contract.

=== Test Venues ===
The three tests took place at the following venues:

London	Manchester	Leeds
Wembley Stadium	Old Trafford	Elland Road
Capacity: 82,000	Capacity: 56,000	Capacity: 40,000

== First Test ==
This was Australia's first visit to Wembley Stadium since the ARL-only Kangaroos' 16–8 win over England in the 1995 Rugby League World Cup final. Great Britain on the other hand, were hoping for a repeat of their Wembley victories over Australia to begin both the 1990 (19–12) and 1994 (8–4) Ashes Series.

Saturday, 1 November 1997

Great Britain	14 – 38	Australia
Tries: Jason Robinson; James Lowes Goals: Andy Farrell (3)		Tries: Laurie Daley (3); Brett Mullins (2); Craig Gower; Darren Smith; Goals: Ryan Girdler (5)

Wembley Stadium, London
Attendance: 41,135
Referee: Phil Houston (New Zealand)
Player of the Match: Laurie Daley

Great Britain	Position	Australia
Jason Robinson	FB	Darren Lockyer
Alan Hunte	WG	Brett Mullins
Kris Radlinski	CE	Andrew Ettingshausen
Paul Newlove	CE	Ryan Girdler
Anthony Sullivan	WG	Wendell Sailor
Andy Farrell (c)	SO	Laurie Daley (c)
Bobbie Goulding	SH	Craig Gower
Brian McDermott	PR	Jason Stevens
James Lowes	HK	Steve Walters
Paul Broadbent	PR	Brad Thorn
Chris Joynt	SR	Matt Adamson
Mick Cassidy	SR	Gorden Tallis
Paul Sculthorpe	LF	Darren Smith
Steve McNamara	Int.	Robbie Kearns
Paul Atcheson	Int.	Craig Greenhill
Adrian Morley	Int.	Ken Nagas
Dean Sampson	Int.	Brett Kimmorley
Andy Goodway	Coach	John Lang

An Australian team drawn from the rebel Super League competition was much too good for a Britain team coached by former Great Britain international Andy Goodway and captained by giant Wigan lock forward Andy Farrell. Former Aussie international John Lang was coach of the Australians with the team captained by Laurie Daley, a veteran of the successful 1990 and 1994 Kangaroo tours, and one of only five players in the team who had played a test at Wembley (Daley, Brett Mullins, Wendell Sailor and Steve Walters had played in 1994, while Andrew Ettingshausen had played in both 1990 and 1994. Walters had also played in the 1992 Rugby League World Cup final at Wembley when Australia defeated Great Britain 10–6 in front of a then world record international attendance of 73,631). Future great of the game Darren Lockyer made his international debut for Australia at fullback. This would be the 6th and final rugby league Test match played at the old Wembley Stadium which was demolished in 2003. The victory giving Australia a 6–4 record at the famous old stadium dating back to the last game of the 1929–30 Kangaroo Tour when Australia defeated Wales 26–10 in what was the first ever rugby league international played at Wembley. The Kangaroos would next get to play Wembley in October 2011, that time at the new Wembley Stadium when they defeated England 36–20 in the 2011 Four Nations.

== Second Test ==
This game remains the only time that an Australian team has lost at Old Trafford since first playing there in 1986.

Saturday, 8 November 1997

Great Britain	20 – 12	Australia
Tries: Andy Farrell; Jason Robinson; Goals: Andy Farrell (6/7)		Tries: Steve Walters; Craig Gower; Goals: Darren Lockyer (2/2)

Old Trafford, Manchester
Attendance: 40,324
Referee: Phil Houston (New Zealand)
Player of the Match: Andy Farrell

Great Britain	Position	Australia
Paul Atcheson	FB	Darren Lockyer
Jason Robinson	WG	Ken Nagas
Kris Radlinski	CE	Andrew Ettingshausen
Paul Newlove	CE	Brett Mullins
Alan Hunte	WG	Wendell Sailor
Andy Farrell (c)	SO	Laurie Daley (c)
Bobbie Goulding	SH	Craig Gower
Brian McDermott	PR	Jason Stevens
James Lowes	HK	Steve Walters
Paul Broadbent	PR	Brad Thorn
Chris Joynt	SR	Matt Adamson
Adrian Morley	SR	Gorden Tallis
Paul Sculthorpe	LF	Darren Smith
Sean Long	Int.	Robbie Kearns
Simon Haughton	Int.	Craig Greenhill
Steve McNamara	Int.	Russell Richardson
Mike Forshaw	Int.
Andy Goodway	Coach	John Lang

Great Britain dropped three players following their first test defeat; Mick Cassidy, Anthony Sullivan and Dean Sampson. Martin Crompton was also sacked from the squad after failing to report to training.

Gorden Tallis was sin-binned for dissent in the second half. Andy Farrell was credited for inspiring the British to victory.

== Third Test ==
Sunday, 16 November 1997

Great Britain	20 – 37	Australia
Tries: Simon Haughton (2); Jason Robinson Goals: Andy Farrell (4)		Tries: Wendell Sailor (2); Ken Nagas; Laurie Daley; Brad Thorn; Robbie Kearns; Darren Smith; Goals: Ryan Girdler (4); Field Goal: Darren Lockyer

Elland Road, Leeds
Attendance: 39,337
Referee: Phil Houston (New Zealand)
Player of the Match: Darren Smith

Great Britain	Position	Australia
Paul Atcheson	FB	Darren Lockyer
Jason Robinson	WG	Ken Nagas
Kris Radlinski	CE	Andrew Ettingshausen
Paul Newlove	CE	Ryan Girdler
Alan Hunte	WG	Wendell Sailor
Andy Farrell (c)	SO	Laurie Daley (c)
Bobbie Goulding	SH	Craig Gower
Brian McDermott	PR	Jason Stevens
James Lowes	HK	Steve Walters
Paul Broadbent	PR	Brad Thorn
Chris Joynt	SR	Gorden Tallis
Adrian Morley	SR	Bradley Clyde
Paul Sculthorpe	LF	Darren Smith
Sean Long	Int.	Robbie Kearns
Simon Haughton	Int.	Matt Adamson
Steve McNamara	Int.	Brett Kimmorley
Mike Forshaw	Int.	Russell Richardson
Andy Goodway	Coach	John Lang

Australia wrapped up the Super League Test series with a 37–20 win over the Lions at Elland Road in Leeds. The Australians also extended their unbeaten run against Great Britain at Elland Road in Leeds, having won all four of their games with the Lions played at the stadium since 1986.
