= 1994 NSWRL season =

Rugby league competition

1994 New South Wales Rugby League
- Teams: 16
- Premiers: Canberra (3rd title)
- Minor premiers: Canterbury-Bankstown (6th title)
- Matches played: 182
- Points scored: 7416
- Average attendance: 15,013
- Attendance: 2,732,389
- Top points scorer(s): Daryl Halligan (270)
- Wooden spoon: Balmain Tigers (4th spoon)
- Rothmans Medal: David Fairleigh
- Top try-scorer(s): Steve Renouf (23)

The 1994 NSWRL season (known as the 1994 Winfield Cup Premiership due to sponsorship from Winfield) was the eighty-seventh season of professional rugby league football in Australia. Sixteen clubs, including 14 from within the borders of New South Wales plus two from Queensland, competed for the J J Giltinan Shield during the season, which culminated in a grand final match for the Winfield Cup trophy between the Canberra Raiders and the Canterbury-Bankstown Bulldogs.

== Season summary ==
On the first of June, the previous season's premiers, the Broncos played in the 1994 World Club Challenge match in Brisbane against British champions Wigan. Wigan defeated the Broncos 20 to 14 at ANZ Stadium in front of 54,220 spectators. On 14 July the North Sydney Bears were fined $87,000 for breaching the salary cap. In total, twenty-two regular season rounds were played from March till August, resulting in a top five of Canterbury-Bankstown, North Sydney, Canberra, Manly-Warringah and Brisbane who went on to battle it out in the finals. The 1994 season's Rothmans Medallist was North Sydney forward David Fairleigh. The Dally M Award went to Manly-Warringah's five-eighth, Cliff Lyons who was also named as Rugby League Week's player of the year. 1994 was the last premiership season to be administered by the New South Wales Rugby League. At the end of the season control of the Winfield Cup would be passed on to the Australian Rugby League and re-branded as such, as part of the move to become a more national competition. This season was also the last in the Premiership for future Australian Rugby League Hall of Fame inductee and coach, Mal Meninga. At the end of the 1994 season a squad of players from the NSWRL Premiership went on the 1994 Kangaroo tour.

The grand finals:

- Canberra Raiders vs Canterbury-Bankstown Bulldogs (Seniors Grade)
- Cronulla-Sutherland Sharks vs Newcastle Knights (Reserve Grade)
- Cronulla-Sutherland Sharks vs Eastern Suburbs Roosters (Under-21s Grade)

The winners in all grades were:

- Canberra Raiders (Seniors Grade)
- Cronulla-Sutherland Sharks (Reserve Grade)
- Cronulla-Sutherland Sharks (Under-21s Grade)

The test match

- Australia vs France

The State of Origin Series

- Queensland vs New South Wales

=== Teams ===
The lineup of teams remained unchanged from the previous season, with sixteen clubs contesting the premiership, including five inner Sydney-based foundation teams, another six from greater Sydney, two from greater New South Wales, two from Queensland, and one from the Australian Capital Territory.

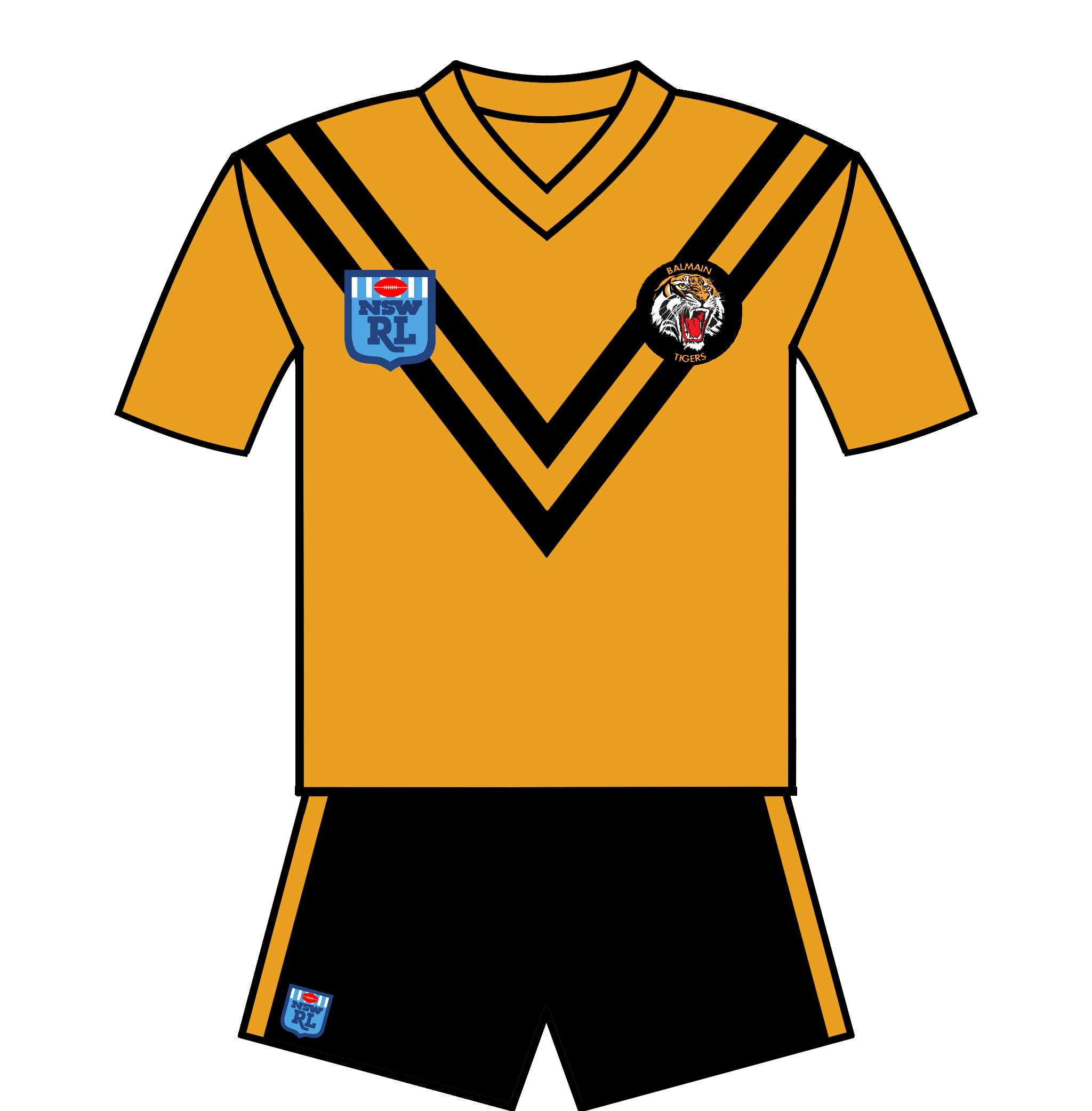
Balmain; Tigers 87th season Ground: Leichhardt Oval; Coach: Wayne Pearce; Captain: Ben Elias

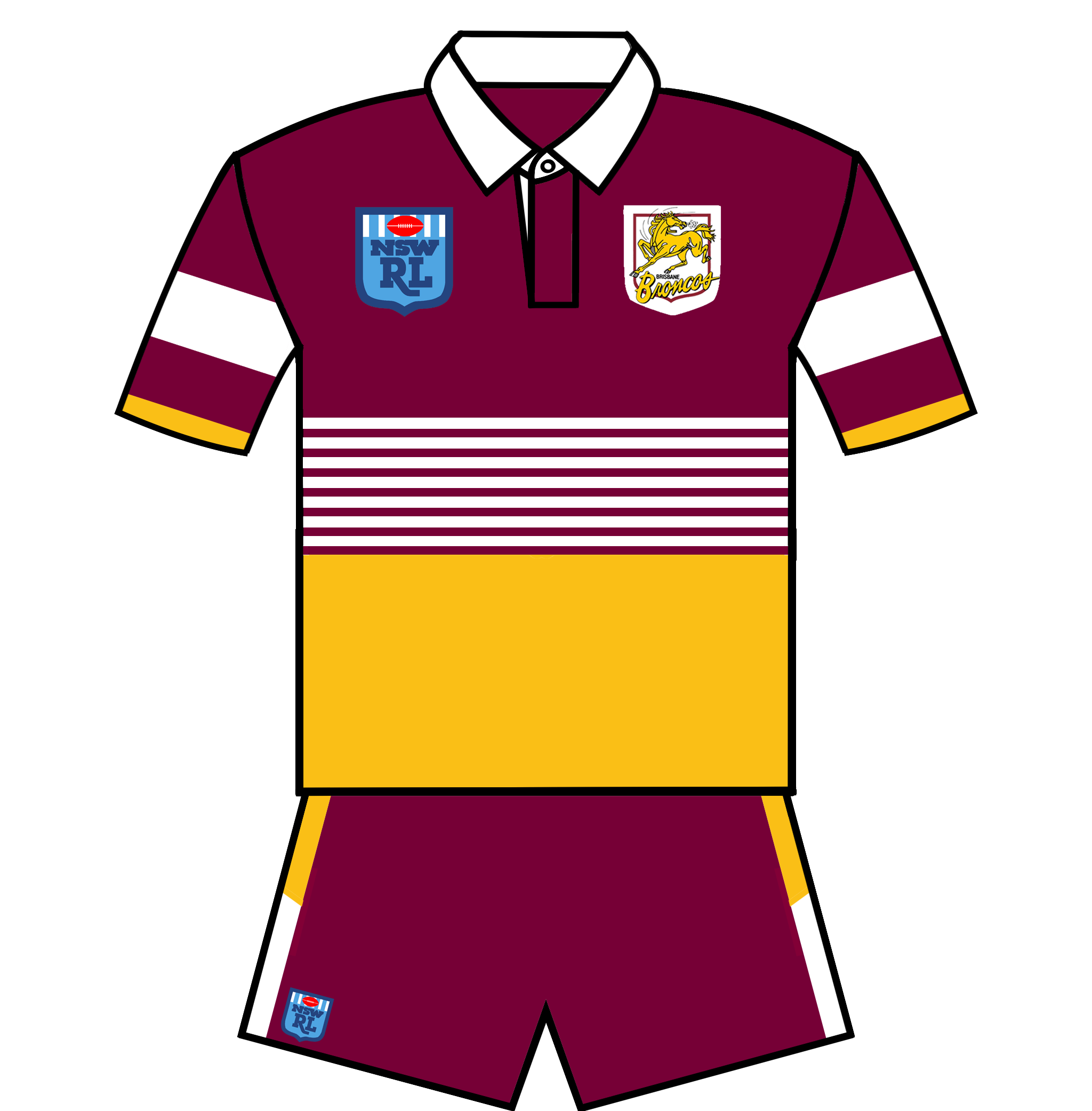
Brisbane; Broncos 7th season Ground: ANZ Stadium; Coach: Wayne Bennett; Captain: Allan Langer

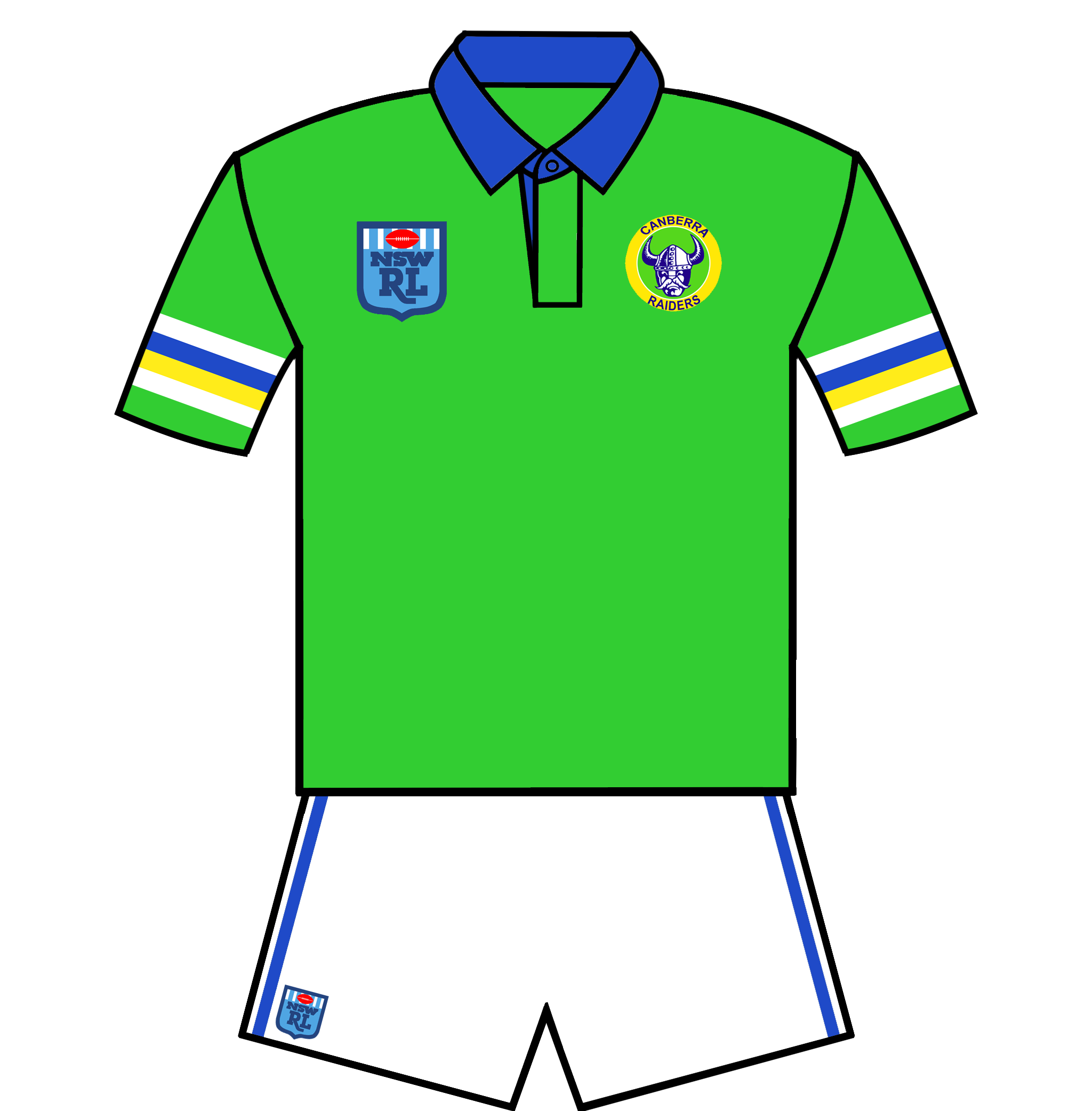
Canberra; Raiders 13th season Ground: Bruce Stadium; Coach: Tim Sheens; Captain: Mal Meninga

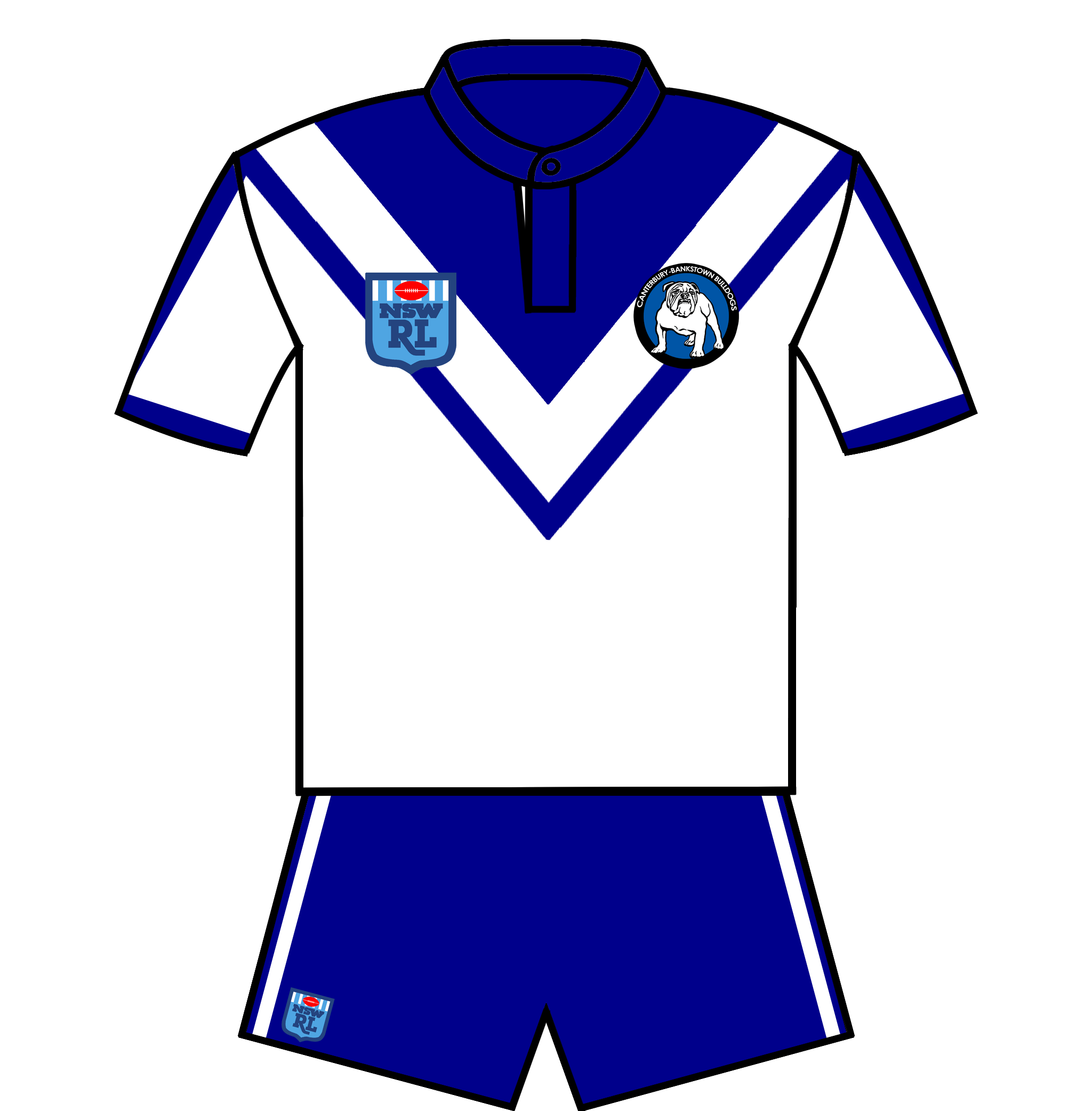
Canterbury-Bankstown; Bulldogs 60th season Ground: Belmore Oval; Coach: Chris Anderson; Captain: Terry Lamb

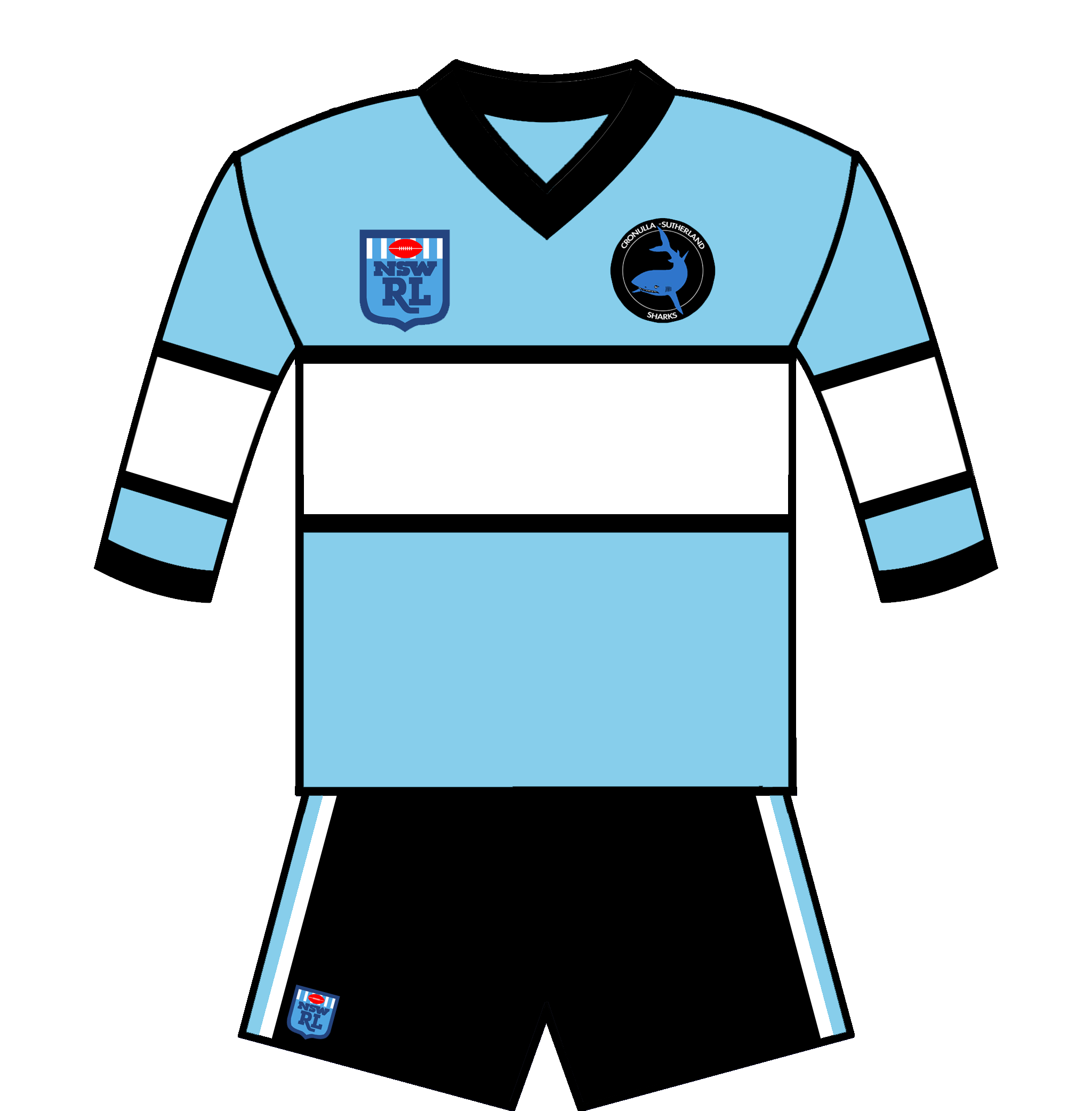
Cronulla-Sutherland; Sharks 28th season Ground: Endeavour Park; Coach: John Lang; Captain: Dan Stains

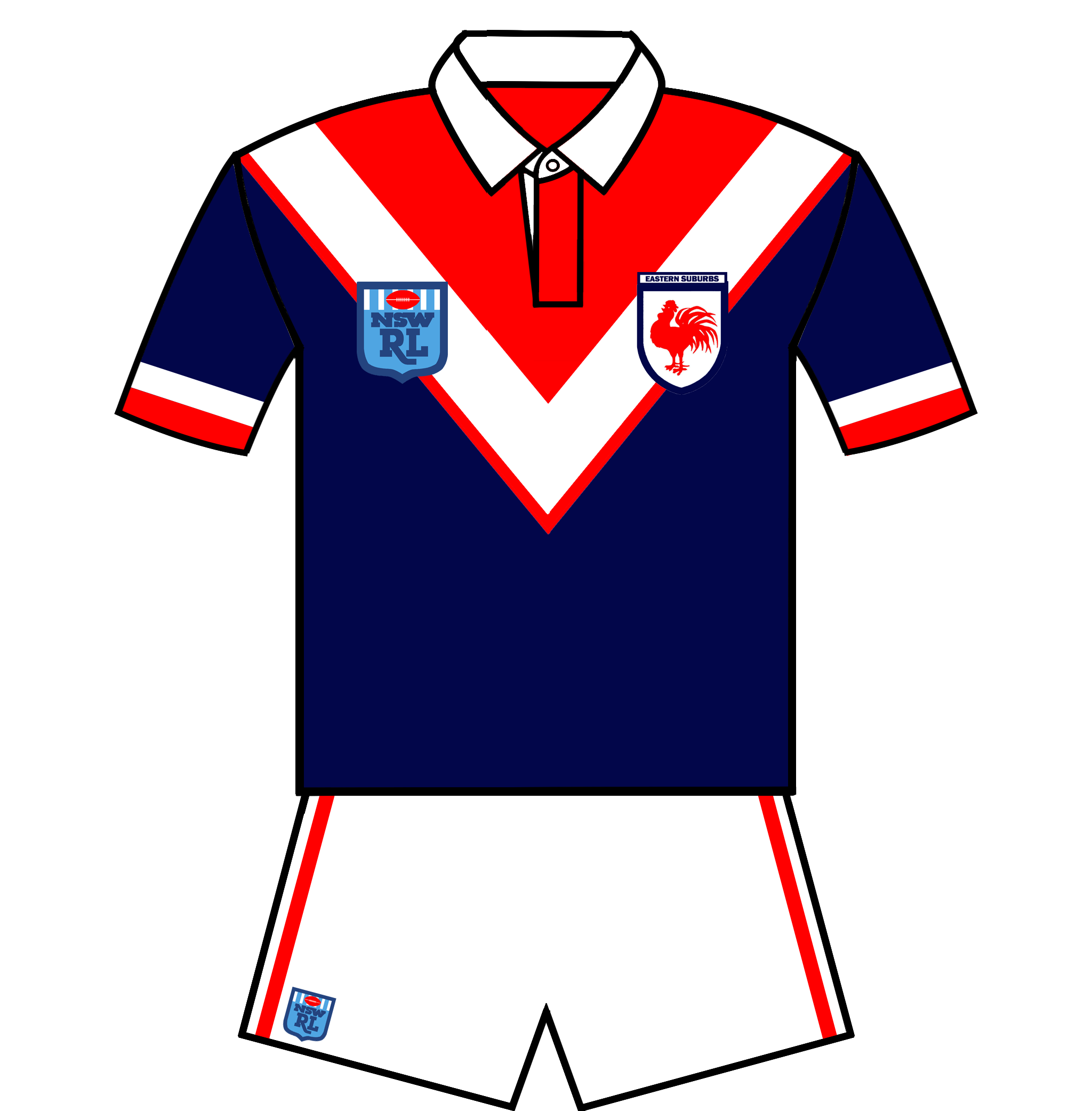
Eastern Suburbs; Roosters 87th season Ground: Sydney Football Stadium; Coach: Mark Murray → Arthur Beetson; Captain: Craig Salvatori

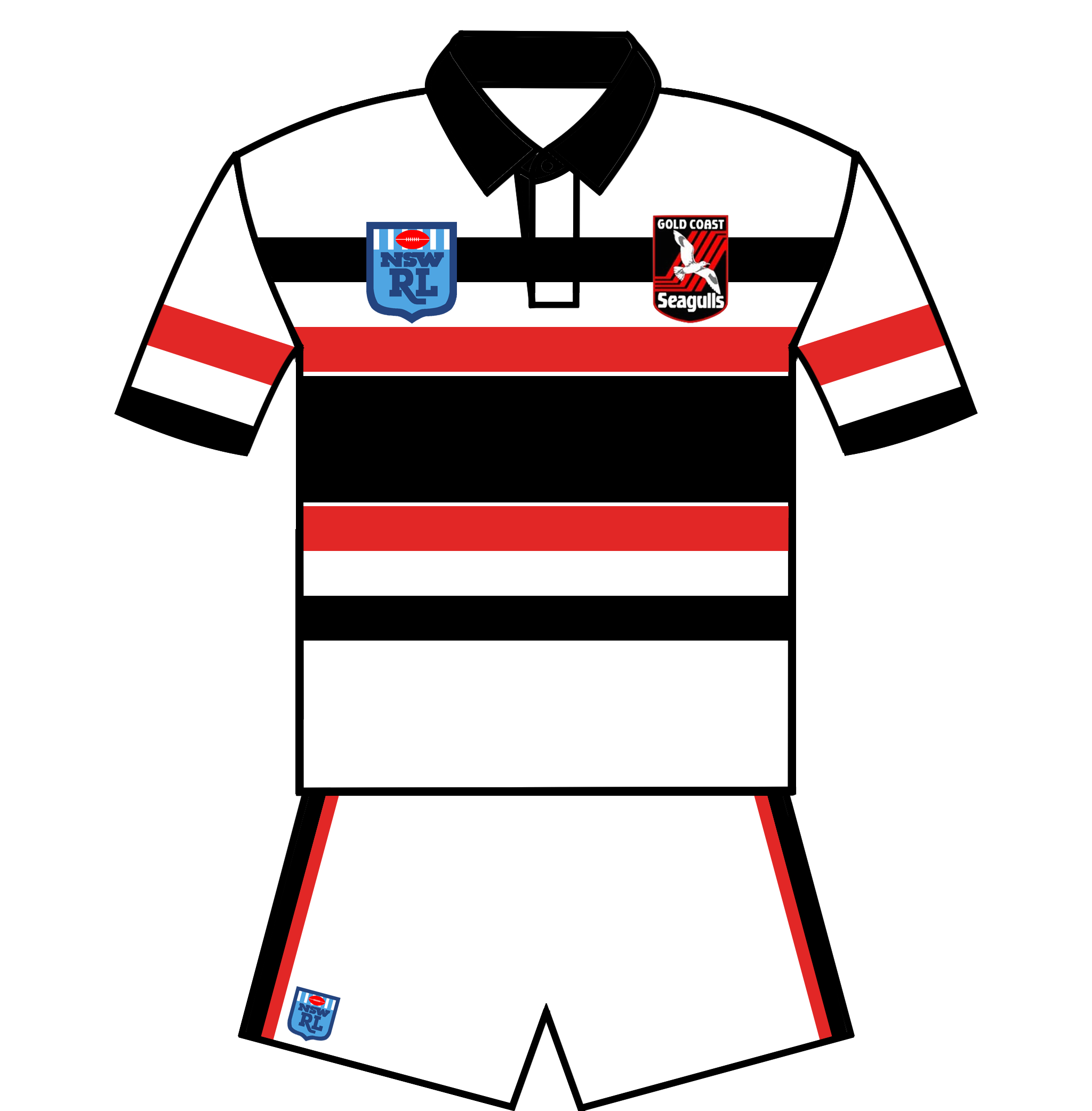
Gold Coast; Seagulls 7th season Ground: Seagulls Stadium; Coach: John Harvey; Captain: Craig Coleman

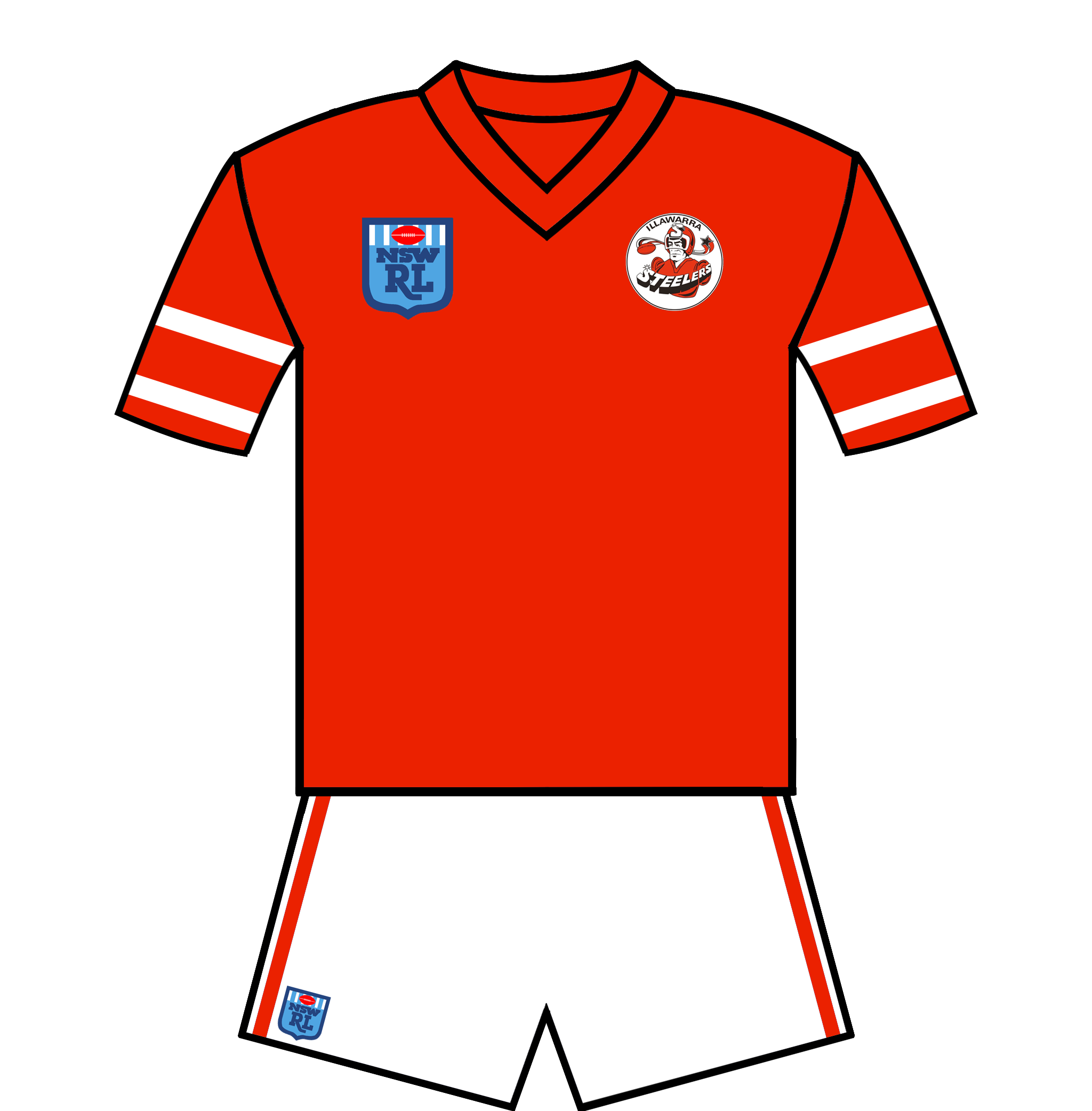
Illawarra; Steelers 13th season Ground: Wollongong Stadium; Coach: Graham Murray; Captain: John Cross

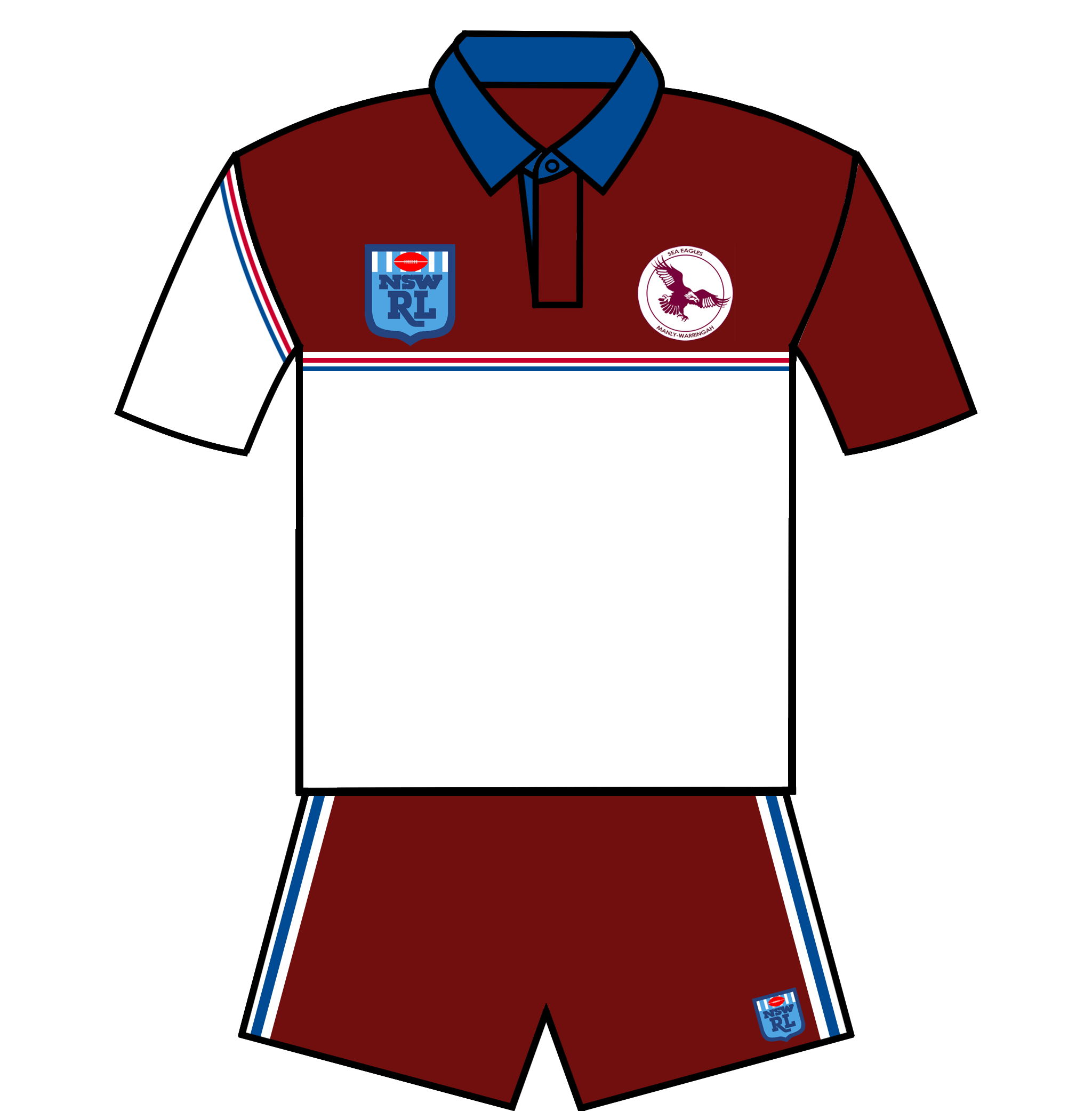
Manly-Warringah; Sea Eagles 48th season Ground: Brookvale Oval; Coach: Bob Fulton; Captain: Geoff Toovey

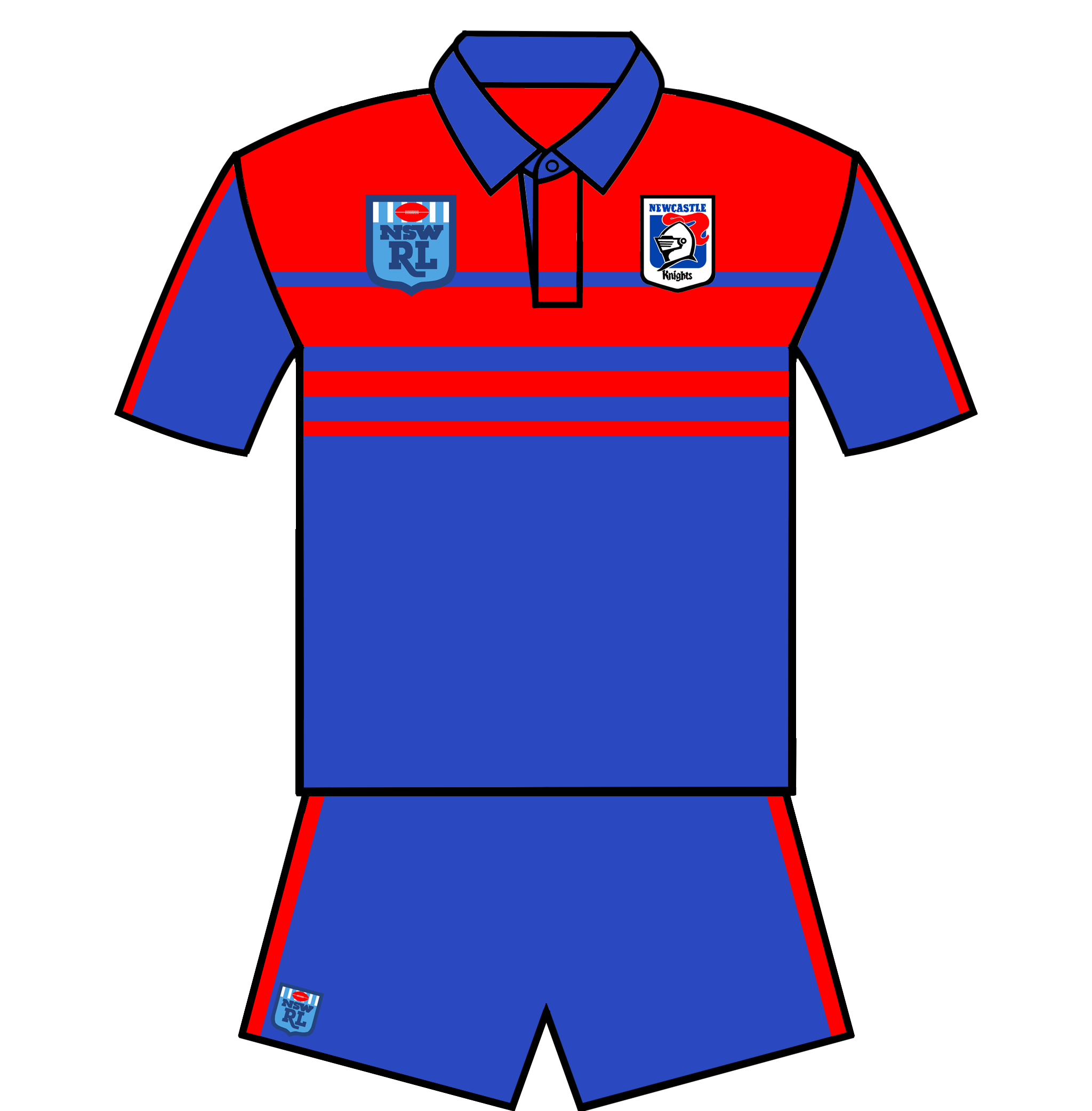
Newcastle; Knights 7th season Ground: Marathon Stadium; Coach: David Waite; Captain: Mark Sargent

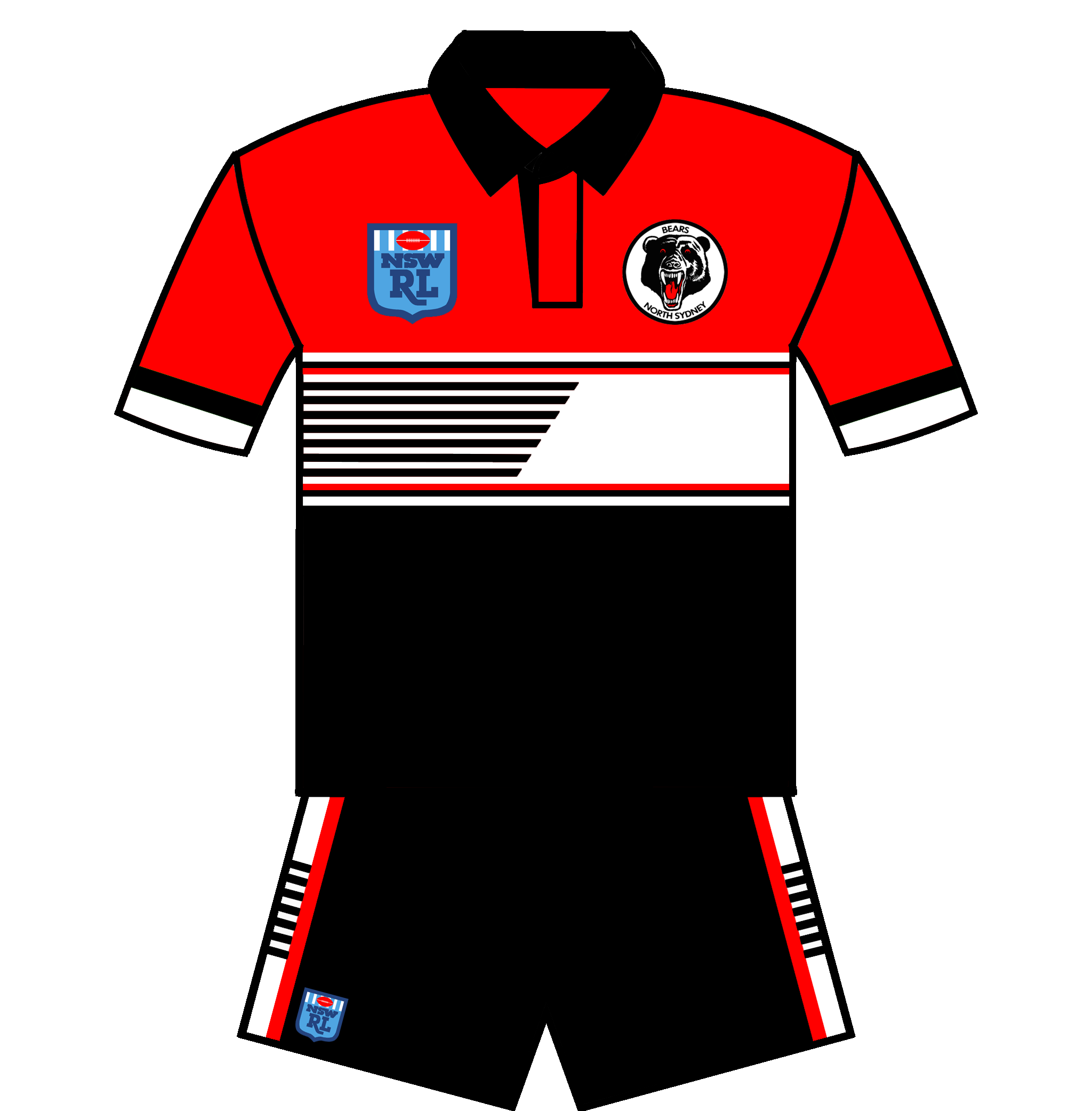
North Sydney; Bears 87th season Ground: North Sydney Oval; Coach: Peter Louis; Captain: Jason Taylor

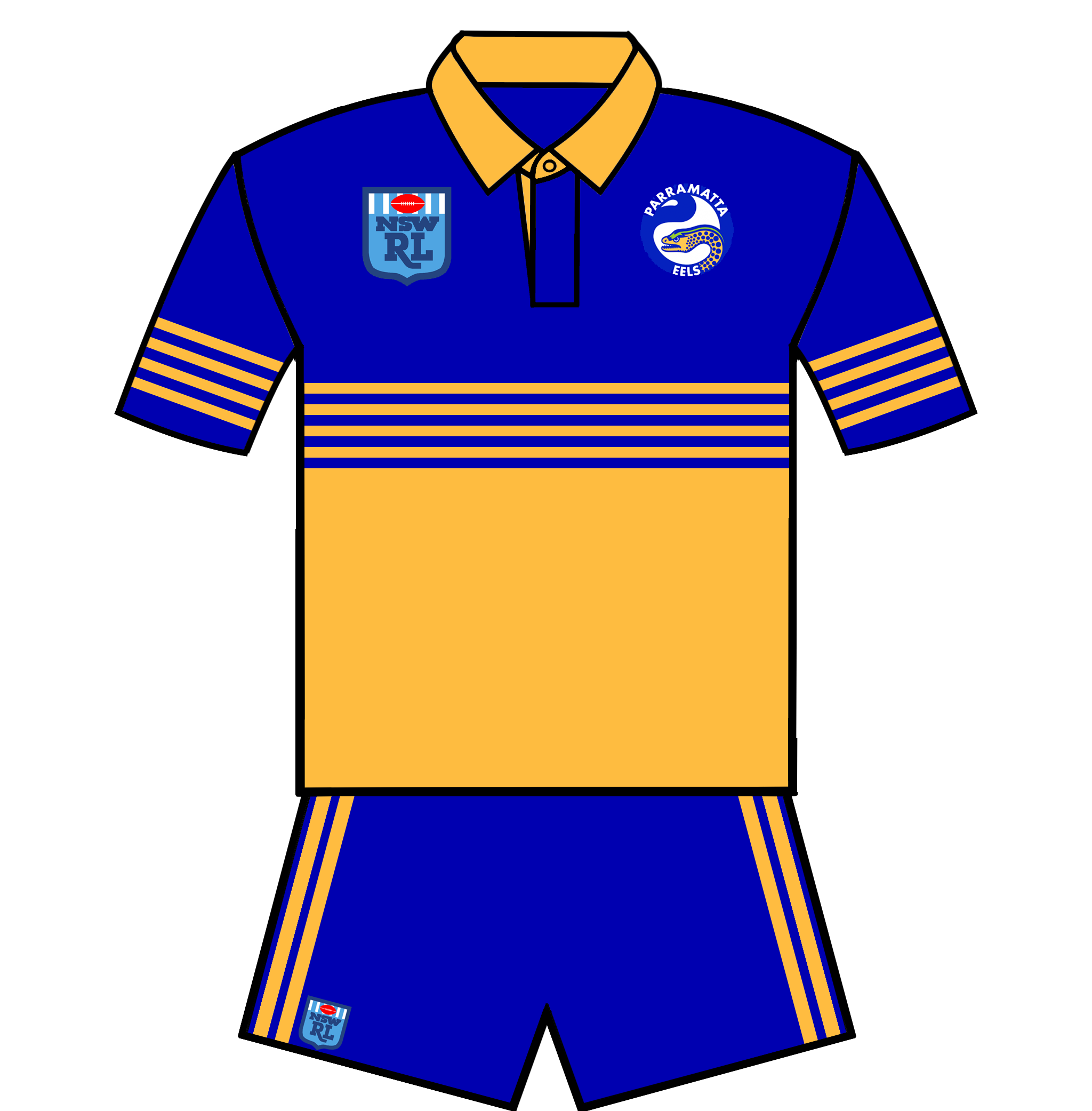
Parramatta; Eels 48th season Ground: Parramatta Stadium; Coach: Ron Hilditch; Captain: Paul Dunn

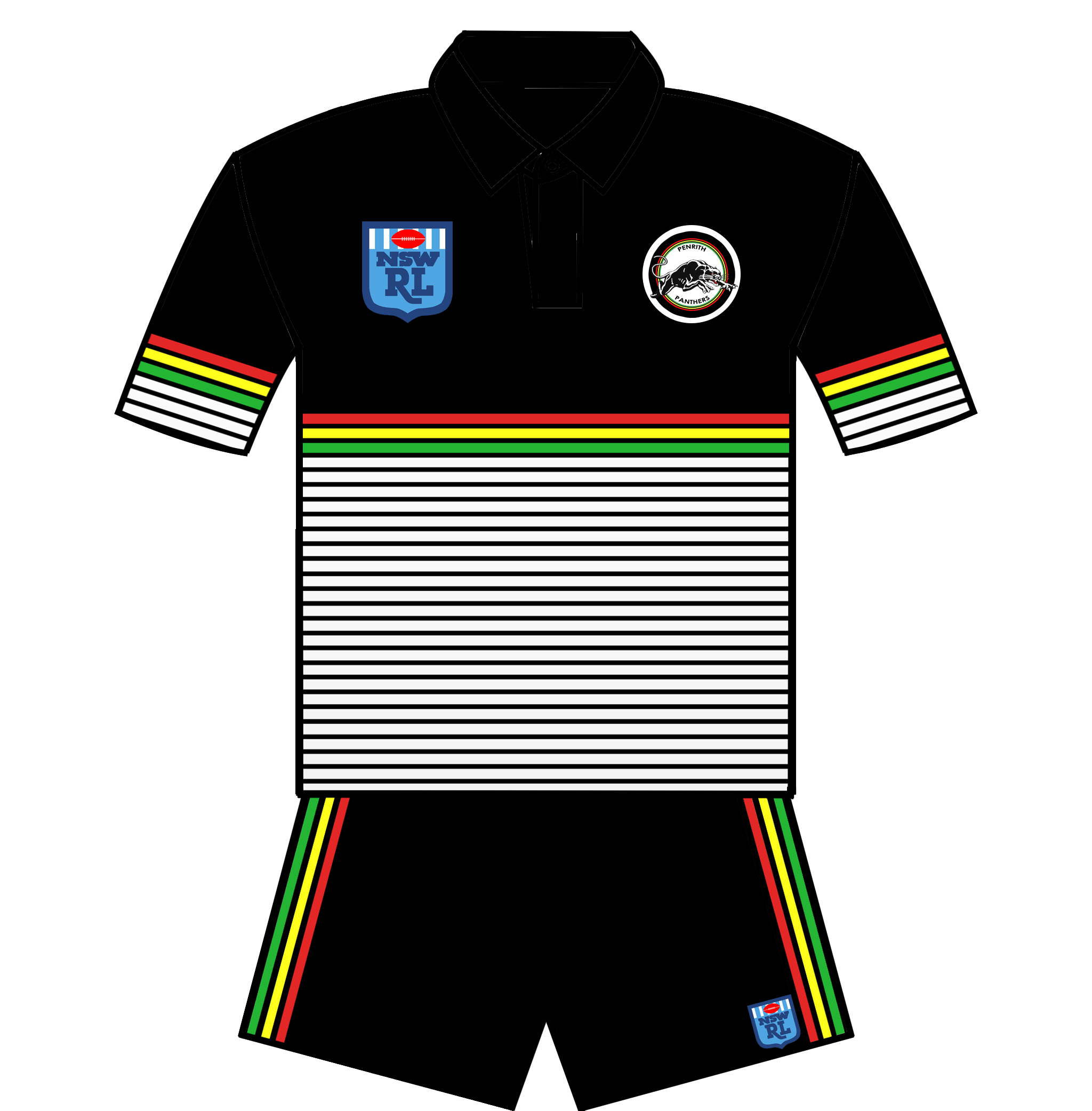
Penrith; Panthers 28th season Ground: Penrith Stadium; Coach: Phil Gould → Royce Simmons; Captain: John Cartwright

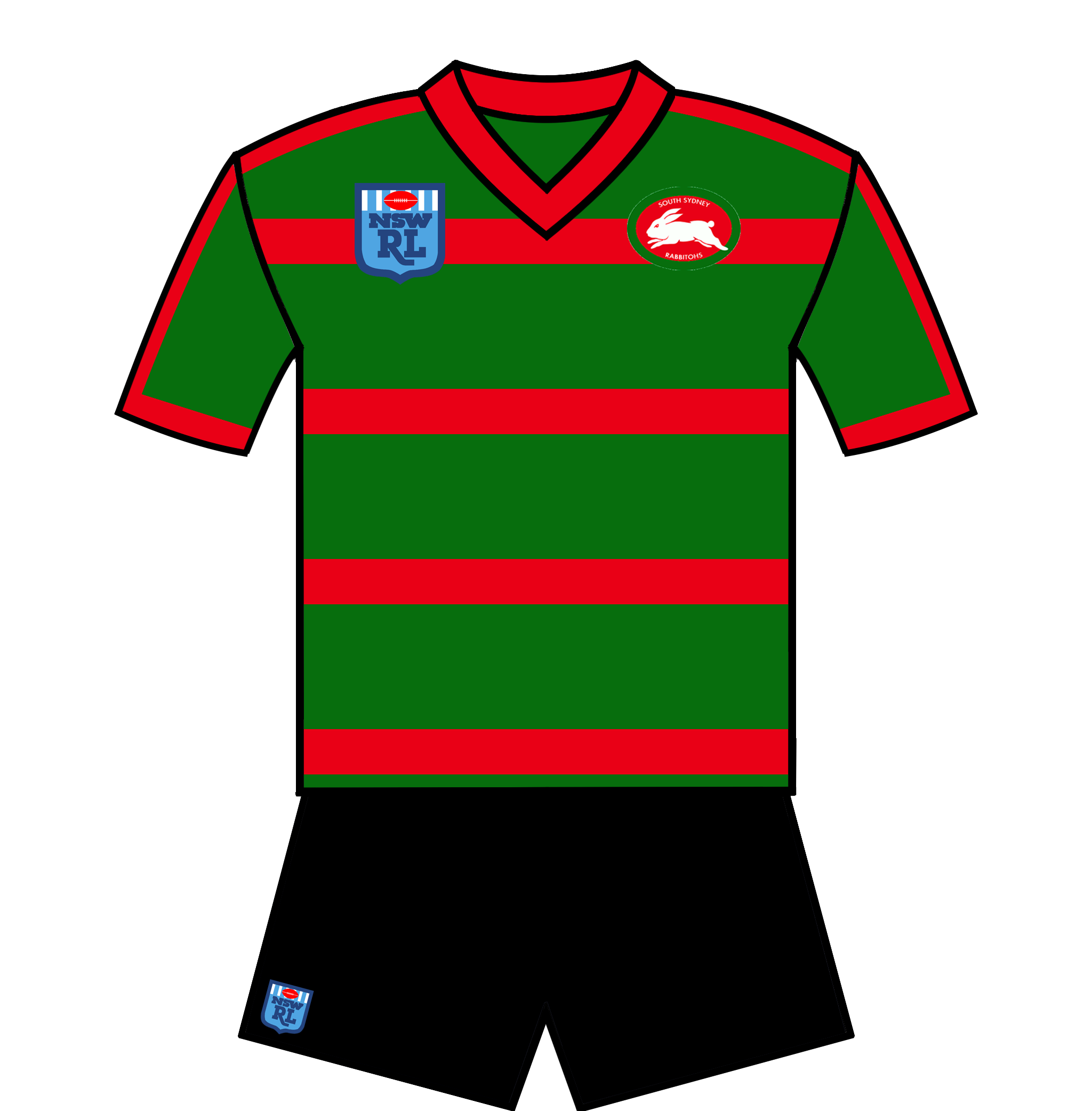
South Sydney; Rabbitohs 87th season Ground: Sydney Football Stadium; Coach: Ken Shine; Captain: Dean Schifilliti

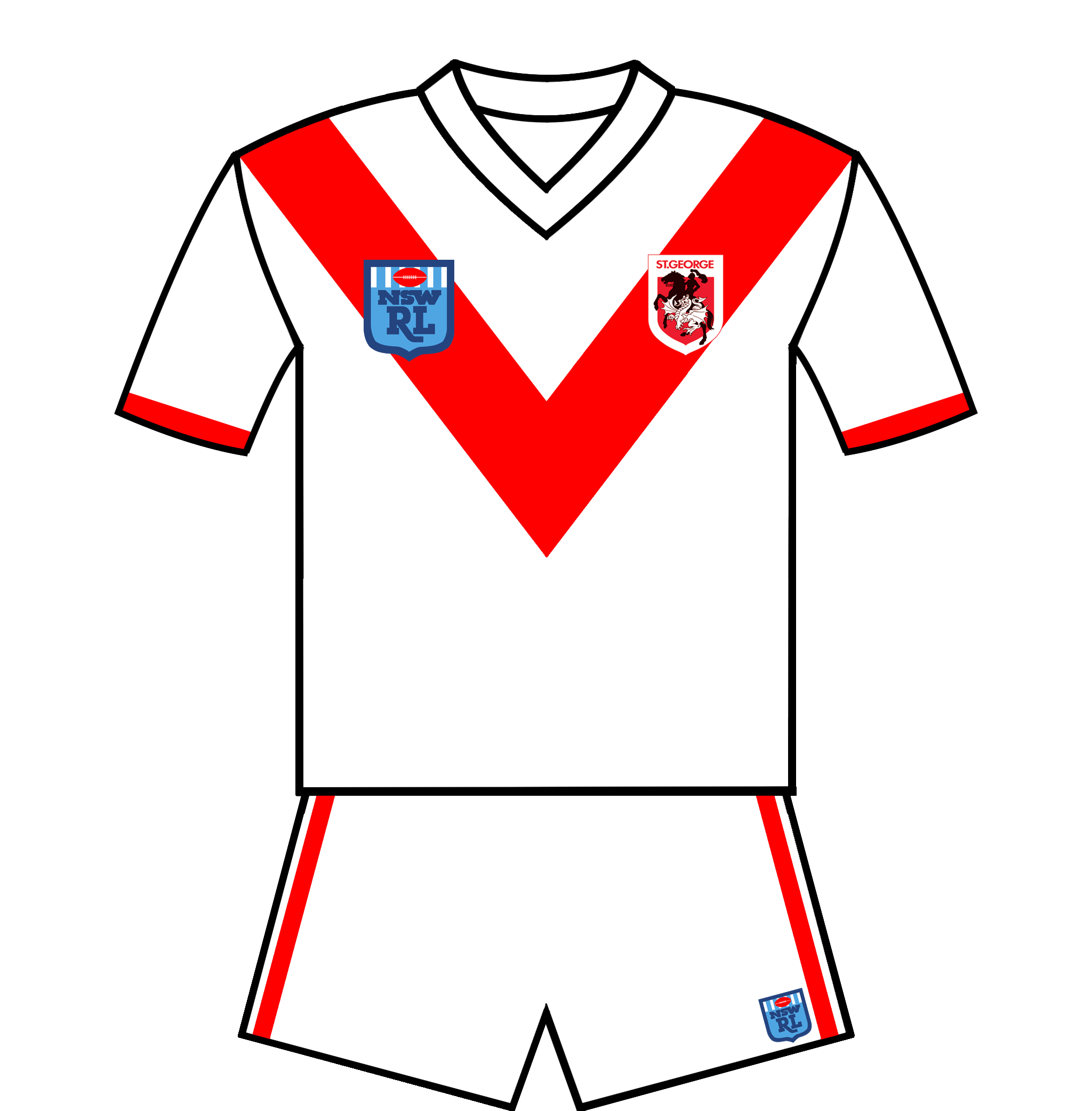
St. George; Dragons 74th season Ground: Kogarah Oval; Coach: Brian Smith; Captain: Mark Coyne

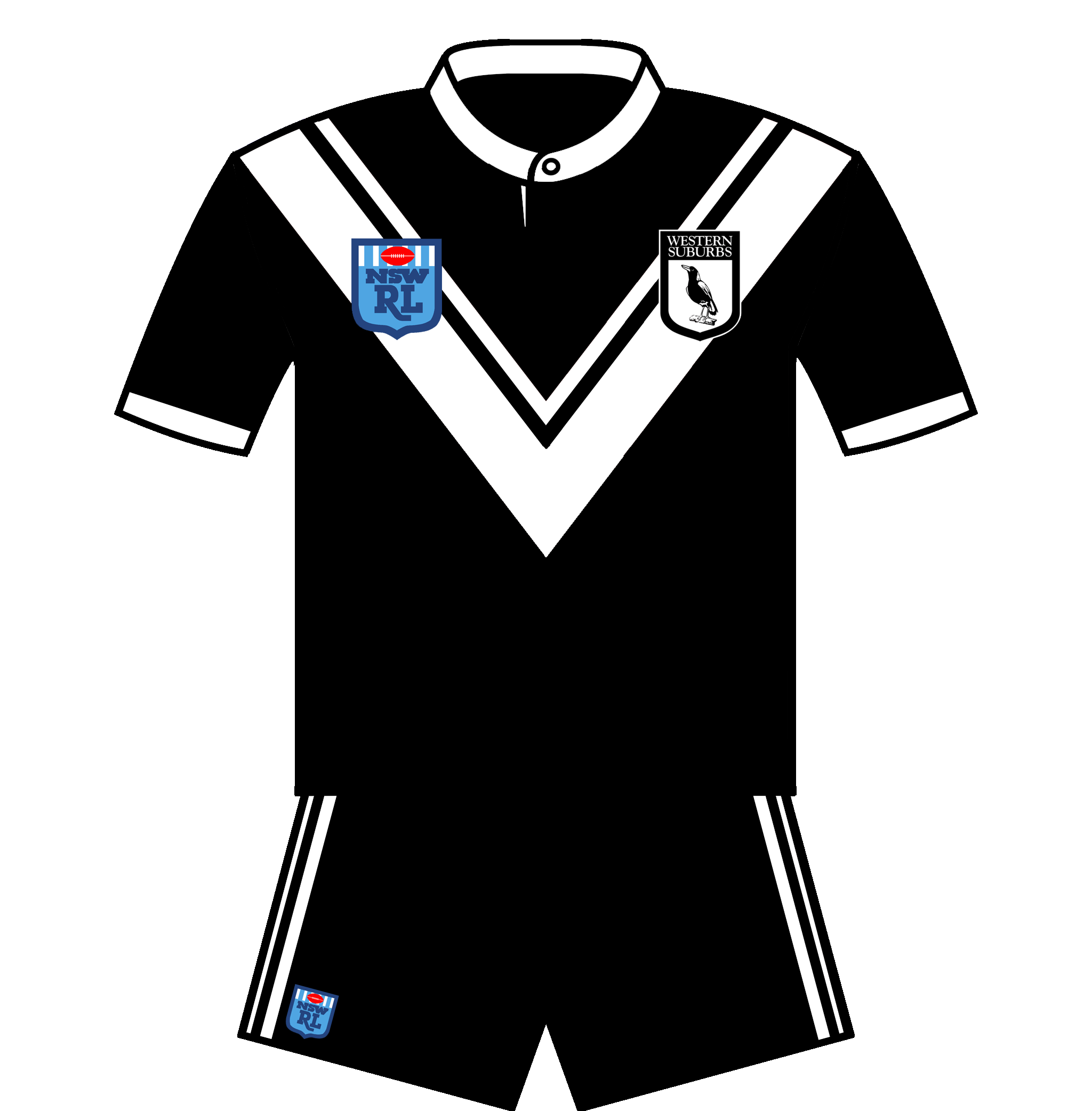
Western Suburbs; Magpies 87th season Ground: Campbelltown Stadium; Coach: Wayne Ellis; Captain: Paul Langmack → Jim Serdaris

=== Advertising ===
In 1994, the League and its advertising agency Hertz Walpole returned to the original 1989 recording of "The Best" by Tina Turner to underscore the season launch ad. Footage had been shot of Turner's performance at the 1993 grand final and a studio bluescreen shoot also took place during that visit ensuring a store of images that could be used in flexible adaptations for the final two years of Turner's association with the competition and the Winfield Cup.

The 1994 advertisement used the performance and superimposed studio footage of Turner into crowd and stadium scenes that replicated the Sydney Football Stadium. The closing scenes of the commercial made it appear that Turner was singing the song high up in the Sydney Football Stadium's stands in front of its identifiable stretched-sail roofing.

== Regular season ==
Team	1	2	3	4	5	6	7	8	9	10	11	12	13	14	15	16	17	18	19	20	21	22	F1	F2	F3	GF
Balmain Tigers	**NOR** **−11**	PAR +2	**GCS** **+22**	STG −40	**EAS** **−30**	PEN −24	**BRI** **−22**	SOU −2	**NEW** **+4**	CRO −8	**MAN** **−42**	WES −4	**ILA** **−16**	CBY −16	**CAN** **−36**	NOR −36	PAR −12	GCS −26	**STG** **−2**	EAS +7	**PEN** **−12**	BRI −35				
Brisbane Broncos	**PAR**; **0**	GCS −13	**STG** **−4**	EAS +32	**PEN** **+31**	**NOR** **−1**	BAL +22	**CRO** **+32**	MAN −10	**WES** **+30**	ILA −22	**CBY** **+2**	CAN −19	**SOU** **+30**	NEW −14	PAR +30	**GCS** **+36**	STG +12	**EAS** **+18**	PEN −16	NOR +17	**BAL** **+35**	MAN +12	NOR −1		
Canberra Raiders	CRO −8	**SOU** **+30**	**NEW** **+26**	CBY −5	**ILA** **+14**	WES +16	**MAN** **+24**	**PAR** **+14**	GCS −4	**STG** **+30**	**EAS** **+34**	PEN −14	**BRI** **+19**	NOR −15	BAL +36	**CRO** **+44**	SOU +40	NEW +36	**CBY** **+30**	ILA +11	**WES** **+18**	MAN +3	NOR +14	CBY −1*	NOR +13	CBY +24
Canterbury-Bankstown Bulldogs	MAN +6	**CRO** **−1**	SOU +7	**CAN** **+5**	**NEW** **+24**	ILA +10	**WES** **+6**	**GCS** **+24**	**STG** **+18**	EAS +14	**PEN** **+20**	BRI −2	**NOR** **−11**	**BAL** **+16**	PAR +16	**MAN** **+16**	CRO +2	**SOU** **+7**	CAN −30	NEW +12	**ILA** **+10**	WES +28	X	**CAN** **+1***	X	**CAN** **−24**
Cronulla-Sutherland Sharks	**CAN** **+8**	CBY +1	**ILA** **−14**	WES +26	**MAN** **+12**	NEW −17	SOU −2	BRI −32	**NOR** **+7**	**BAL** **+8**	PAR −12	**GCS** **+46**	STG −14	EAS +12	**PEN** **+32**	CAN −44	**CBY** **−2**	ILA −24	**WES** **+4**	MAN −28	**NEW** **+22**	**SOU** **+42**				
Eastern Suburbs Roosters	**STG** **−6**	NOR −18	PEN −10	**BRI** **−32**	BAL +30	**PAR** **+10**	GCS +18	**WES**; **0**	ILA −26	**CBY** **−14**	CAN −34	**SOU** **−6**	NEW −6	**CRO** **−12**	MAN −34	STG +20	**NOR** **−20**	**PEN** **+22**	BRI −18	**BAL** **−7**	PAR −28	**GCS** **+2**				
Gold Coast Seagulls	PEN; 0	**BRI** **+13**	BAL −22	**PAR** **−2**	NOR −28	STG −24	**EAS** **−18**	CBY −24	**CAN** **+4**	SOU −18	**NEW** **+2**	CRO −46	**MAN** **−4**	WES −34	**ILA** **−16**	**PEN** **−2**	BRI −36	**BAL** **+26**	PAR +12	**NOR** **−26**	**STG** **−10**	EAS −2				
Illawarra Steelers	WES −6	**MAN**; **0**	CRO +14	**SOU**; **0**	CAN −14	**CBY** **−10**	NEW −23	**STG** **+24**	**EAS** **+26**	PEN; 0	**BRI** **+22**	NOR −8	BAL +16	**PAR** **+22**	GCS +16	**WES** **+22**	MAN −15	**CRO** **+24**	SOU +2	**CAN** **−11**	CBY −10	**NEW** **+6**				
Manly Warringah Sea Eagles	**CBY** **−6**	ILA; 0	**WES** **+58**	NEW +3	CRO −12	**SOU** **+15**	CAN −24	PEN +10	**BRI** **+10**	NOR +3	BAL +42	**PAR** **+14**	GCS +4	**STG** **+61**	**EAS** **+34**	CBY −16	**ILA** **+15**	WES +14	**NEW** **+16**	**CRO** **+28**	SOU +28	**CAN** **−3**	**BRI** **−12**			
Newcastle Knights	SOU +29	**WES** **−1**	CAN −26	**MAN** **−3**	CBY −24	**CRO** **+17**	**ILA** **+23**	NOR +4	BAL −4	**PAR** **+30**	GCS −2	**STG** **+10**	**EAS** **+6**	PEN +16	**BRI** **+14**	**SOU** **−14**	WES −14	**CAN** **−36**	MAN −16	**CBY** **−12**	CRO −22	ILA −6				
North Sydney Bears	BAL +11	**EAS** **+18**	PAR +2	**PEN** **+10**	**GCS** **+28**	BRI +1	STG +7	**NEW** **−4**	CRO −7	**MAN** **−3**	WES; 0	**ILA** **+8**	CBY +11	**CAN** **+15**	SOU +22	**BAL** **+36**	EAS +20	**PAR** **+6**	PEN +10	GCS +26	**BRI** **−17**	**STG** **+26**	**CAN** **−14**	**BRI** **+1**	**CAN** **−13**	
Parramatta Eels	BRI; 0	**BAL** **−2**	**NOR** **−2**	GCS +2	**STG** **−8**	EAS −10	**PEN** **−24**	CAN −14	**SOU** **−16**	NEW −30	**CRO** **+12**	MAN −14	**WES** **+6**	ILA −22	**CBY** **−16**	**BRI** **−30**	**BAL** **+12**	NOR −6	**GCS** **−12**	STG +15	**EAS** **+28**	PEN +7				
Penrith Panthers	**GCS**; **0**	STG +2	**EAS** **+10**	NOR −10	BRI −31	**BAL** **+24**	PAR +24	**MAN** **−10**	WES +14	**ILA**; **0**	CBY −20	**CAN** **+14**	SOU −8	**NEW** **−16**	CRO −32	GCS +2	**STG** **+4**	EAS −22	**NOR** **−10**	**BRI** **+16**	BAL +12	**PAR** **−7**				
South Sydney Rabbitohs	**NEW** **−29**	CAN −30	**CBY** **−7**	ILA; 0	**WES** **+20**	MAN −15	**CRO** **+2**	**BAL** **+2**	PAR +16	**GCS** **+18**	STG +6	EAS +6	**PEN** **+8**	BRI −30	**NOR** **−22**	NEW +14	**CAN** **−40**	CBY −7	**ILA** **−2**	WES −8	**MAN** **−28**	CRO −42				
St. George Dragons	EAS +6	**PEN** **−2**	BRI +4	**BAL** **+40**	PAR +8	**GCS** **+24**	**NOR** **−7**	ILA −24	CBY −18	CAN −30	**SOU** **−6**	NEW −10	**CRO** **+14**	MAN −61	**WES** **+16**	**EAS** **−20**	PEN −4	**BRI** **−12**	BAL +2	**PAR** **−15**	GCS +10	NOR −26				
Western Suburbs Magpies	**ILA** **+6**	NEW +1	MAN −58	**CRO** **−26**	SOU −20	**CAN** **−16**	CBY −6	EAS; 0	**PEN** **−14**	BRI −30	**NOR**; **0**	**BAL** **+4**	PAR −6	**GCS** **+34**	STG −16	ILA −22	**NEW** **+14**	**MAN** **−14**	CRO −4	**SOU** **+8**	CAN −18	**CBY** **−28**				
Team	1	2	3	4	5	6	7	8	9	10	11	12	13	14	15	16	17	18	19	20	21	22	F1	F2	F3	GF

Bold – Home game
X – Bye
* – Extra time game
Opponent for round listed above margin

=== Ladder ===
Pos	Team	Pld	W	D	L	PF	PA	PD	Pts	Qualification
1	Canterbury-Bankstown Bulldogs	22	18	0	4	537	340	+197	36	Advance to finals series
2	North Sydney Bears	22	17	1	4	517	291	+226	35	Advance to finals series
3	Canberra Raiders (P)	22	17	0	5	677	298	+379	34	Advance to finals series
4	Manly Warringah Sea Eagles	22	16	1	5	605	311	+294	33	Advance to finals series
5	Brisbane Broncos	22	13	1	8	544	316	+228	27	Advance to finals series
6	Illawarra Steelers	22	11	3	8	484	387	+97	25	
7	Cronulla-Sutherland Sharks	22	12	0	10	432	401	+31	24	
8	Penrith Panthers	22	10	2	10	404	448	−44	22	
9	South Sydney Rabbitohs	22	9	1	12	401	569	−168	19	
10	Newcastle Knights	22	9	0	13	427	458	−31	18	
11	St. George Dragons	22	9	0	13	386	497	−111	18	
12	Parramatta Eels	22	7	1	14	350	474	−124	15	
13	Western Suburbs Magpies	22	6	2	14	439	650	−211	14	
14	Eastern Suburbs Roosters	22	6	1	15	344	513	−169	13	
15	Gold Coast Seagulls	22	5	1	16	363	618	−255	11	
16	Balmain Tigers	22	4	0	18	303	642	−339	8	

Source: RLP
(P) Premiers

=== Ladder progression ===
- Numbers highlighted in green indicate that the team finished the round inside the top 5.
- Numbers highlighted in blue indicates the team finished first on the ladder in that round.
- Numbers highlighted in red indicates the team finished last place on the ladder in that round.

	Team	1	2	3	4	5	6	7	8	9	10	11	12	13	14	15	16	17	18	19	20	21	22
1	Canterbury-Bankstown Bulldogs	2	2	4	6	8	10	12	14	16	18	20	20	20	22	24	26	28	30	30	32	34	36
2	North Sydney Bears	2	4	6	8	10	12	14	14	14	14	15	17	19	21	23	25	27	29	31	33	33	35
3	Canberra Raiders	0	2	4	4	6	8	10	12	12	14	16	16	18	18	20	22	24	26	28	30	32	34
4	Manly-Warringah Sea Eagles	0	1	3	5	5	7	7	9	11	13	15	17	19	21	23	23	25	27	29	31	33	33
5	Brisbane Broncos	1	1	1	3	5	5	7	9	9	11	11	13	13	15	15	17	19	21	23	23	25	27
6	Illawarra Steelers	0	1	3	4	4	4	4	6	8	9	11	11	13	15	17	19	19	21	23	23	23	25
7	Cronulla-Sutherland Sharks	2	4	4	6	8	8	8	8	10	12	12	14	14	16	18	18	18	18	20	20	22	24
8	Penrith Panthers	1	3	5	5	5	7	9	9	11	12	12	14	14	14	14	16	18	18	18	20	22	22
9	South Sydney Rabbitohs	0	0	0	1	3	3	5	7	9	11	13	15	17	17	17	19	19	19	19	19	19	19
10	Newcastle Knights	2	2	2	2	2	4	6	8	8	10	10	12	14	16	18	18	18	18	18	18	18	18
11	St. George Dragons	2	2	4	6	8	10	10	10	10	10	10	10	12	12	14	14	14	14	16	16	18	18
12	Parramatta Eels	1	1	1	3	3	3	3	3	3	3	5	5	7	7	7	7	9	9	9	11	13	15
13	Western Suburbs Magpies	2	4	4	4	4	4	4	5	5	5	6	8	8	10	10	10	12	12	12	14	14	14
14	Eastern Suburbs Roosters	0	0	0	0	2	4	6	7	7	7	7	7	7	7	7	9	9	11	11	11	11	13
15	Gold Coast Seagulls	1	3	3	3	3	3	3	3	5	5	7	7	7	7	7	7	7	9	11	11	11	11
16	Balmain Tigers	0	2	4	4	4	4	4	4	6	6	6	6	6	6	6	6	6	6	6	8	8	8

== Finals ==
Home	Score	Away	Match Information
Home	Score	Away	Date and Time	Venue	Referee	Crowd
Qualifying Finals
North Sydney Bears	12–26	Canberra Raiders	3 September 1994	Sydney Football Stadium	Bill Harrigan	33,641
Manly-Warringah Sea Eagles	4–16	Brisbane Broncos	4 September 1994	Sydney Football Stadium	Greg McCallum	34,891
Semi-finals
North Sydney Bears	15–14	Brisbane Broncos	10 September 1994	Sydney Football Stadium	Bill Harrigan	36,011
Canterbury-Bankstown Bulldogs	19–18	Canberra Raiders	11 September 1994	Sydney Football Stadium	Greg McCallum	41,865
Preliminary final
Canberra Raiders	22–9	North Sydney Bears	18 September 1994	Sydney Football Stadium	Greg McCallum	41,941
Grand final
Canterbury-Bankstown Bulldogs	12–36	Canberra Raiders	25 September 1994	Sydney Football Stadium	Greg McCallum	42,234

=== Chart ===
Qualifying final
2	North Sydney	12
3	Canberra	26
4	Manly	4
5	Brisbane	16

Major semi-final
1	Canterbury	19
Canberra	18
Minor semi-final
North Sydney	15
Brisbane	14

Preliminary final
Canberra	22
North Sydney	9

Grand final
Canterbury	12
Canberra	36

=== Grand final ===
Canterbury-Bankstown Bulldogs	Position	Canberra Raiders
1. Scott Wilson	FB	1. Brett Mullins
2. Jason Williams	WG	2. Ken Nagas
3. Steven Hughes	CE	3. Mal Meninga (c)
4. Jarrod McCracken	CE	4. Ruben Wiki
5. Daryl Halligan	WG	5. Noa Nadruku
6. Terry Lamb (c)	FE	6. Laurie Daley
7. Craig Polla-Mounter	HB	7. Ricky Stuart
8. Darren Britt	PR	8. Quentin Pongia
9. Jason Hetherington	HK	9. Steve Walters
10. Martin Bella	PR	46. Paul Osborne
11. Dean Pay	SR	11. Jason Croker
12. Jason Smith	SR	12. David Furner
13. Jim Dymock	LK	13. Bradley Clyde
17. Matthew Ryan	Reserve	42. Brett Hetherington
21. Steve Price	Reserve	43. David Westley
40. Simon Gillies	Reserve	
41. Mark Brokenshire	Reserve	
Chris Anderson	Coach	Tim Sheens

The Canberra Raiders were confident in the lead up, despite their one-point loss to the Bulldogs in the major semi-final, and everything played into their hands from the whistle. Canterbury veteran prop Martin Bella dropped the ball from the kick-off and before too long Canberra had posted two tries.

Canberra legend Mal Meninga was given a champion's farewell as his "Green Machine" swamped the Bulldogs. Canberra's Paul Osborne also enjoyed a fairytale day. On the outer for most of the year, Osborne won a reprieve, playing at Prop after team-mate John Lomax was suspended for a high tackle in the preliminary final against North Sydney. Osborne, playing in his 135th and last career game before retirement, rose to the occasion by setting up the first two Raiders tries in the opening sixteen minutes.

Meninga's 166th and final match for the Raiders ended perfectly when he scored the last try of the day after intercepting a pass from Jason Smith. Meninga then outlasted the cover defence, running almost 40 metres and palming off his opposite Centre Jarrod McCracken to score the try beside the posts, sending the 42,234 strong crowd at the Sydney Football Stadium into raptures. Despite being a goal kicker for most of his career, Meninga declined to take what would have been an easy conversion of his own try, instead leaving the kick to regular team kicker, Clive Churchill Medallist David Furner.

The Canberra Raiders had claimed their third premiership, amassing the highest score in a grand final since Eastern Suburbs defeated St. George 38-0 in 1975. It was the highest-scoring grand final since 1951 when South Sydney defeated Manly 42-14 (though tries then were worth only three points).

Canberra Raiders 36
Tries: Nagas 2, Furner, Daley, Nadruku, Croker, Meninga
Goals: Furner 4/7

Canterbury-Bankstown Bulldogs 12
Tries: Williams, Hetherington
Goals: Halligan 2/2

- Clive Churchill Medallist: David Furner
- Referee: Greg McCallum
- Attendance: 42,234 at the Sydney Football Stadium

== Player statistics ==
The following statistics are as of the conclusion of Round 22.

Top 5 point scorers

Points	Player	Tries	Goals	Field goals
259	Daryl Halligan	12	105	1
234	Matthew Ridge	5	106	2
205	Jason Taylor	6	88	5
170	David Furner	5	75	0
162	Andrew Johns	7	65	4

Top 5 try scorers

Tries	Player
22	Steve Renouf
20	Brett Mullins
19	Jason Croker
18	Andrew Ettingshausen
18	Paul Smith

Top 5 goal scorers

Goals	Player
106	Matthew Ridge
105	Daryl Halligan
88	Jason Taylor
75	David Furner
65	Andrew Johns

== See also ==
- 1994 State of Origin series
