= 1999 Cronulla-Sutherland Sharks season =

- NRL rank: 1st
- 1999 record: Wins: 19; draws: 0; losses: 7
- Points scored: For: 636 (113 tries, 91 goals, 2 field goals); against: 376 (66 tries, 56 goals)

Team information
- Coach: John Lang
- Captain: Andrew Ettingshausen
- Stadium: Shark Park
- Avg. attendance: 13,974

Top scorers
- Tries: David Peachey (19)
- Goals: Mat Rogers (55)
- Points: Mat Rogers (142)
← 1998	2000 →

The 1999 Cronulla-Sutherland Sharks season was the 33rd in the club's history. They competed in the NRL's 1999 Telstra Premiership and despite losing in the preliminary final against St. George-Illawarra, the season was one of the most successful in the club's history after finishing with just their second minor premiership without dropping below equal first throughout the entire season. The club enjoyed record crowds as well as breaking the club record for most points and tries in a season. The club also equaled their biggest ever victory with a 46–0 thrashing of Western Suburbs as well as breaking their highest points tally in a match with the 56–18 defeat of North Sydney. David Peachey finished the season with 19 tries, which was also a record for the club. The club was coached by John Lang and captained by Andrew Ettingshausen while their major shirt sponsor was Pepsi.

Several of the club's players were also rewarded with selection in representative games. In the State of Origin series Martin Lang, Chris McKenna and Mat Rogers were all selected for Queensland while Jason Stevens was selected for New South Wales. Russell Richardson, Mat Rogers and Jason Stevens were selected for Australia for the end of season Tri-Nations. At the Dally M Awards, John Lang was named the Coach of the Year, Mat Rogers Representative Player of the Year and David Peachey Fullback of the Year.

Throughout the season, there was ongoing speculation around the club's future in the competition with some reports suggesting that a possible merger with either the embattled South Sydney club or the St. George-Illawarra club was a possible option.

== Season summary ==
Before the season Andrew Ettingshausen announced his retirement from all representative football in order to concentrate on his efforts for the club. On 31 January, former Cronulla forward Graeme Sams died of cancer at the age of 52. It was reported in February that the club was planning on building a resort, worth somewhere in the region of $50 million, near their home ground in order to secure their long term position in the competition.

=== March ===
The season kicked off on 7 March with an impressive 44–0 victory over the Balmain Tigers at Shark Park with two tries from Sean Ryan as well as tries to David Peachey, Mat Rogers, Brett Howland, Chris McKenna, Andrew Ettingshausen and debutant Jason Ferris. The result equaled the second biggest win in the club's history. However, more importantly for Cronulla, the match marked the return of captain Andrew Ettingshausen from a career threatening neck injury which had seen him sidelined for approximately eight months. The victory put the club in first place after the first round, due to their superior points difference. In round 2 Cronulla won 14–6 against defending premiers, the Brisbane Broncos, at ANZ Stadium with tries to David Peachey and Paul Donaghy. It was the lowest ever score by Brisbane at ANZ Stadium since they had begun playing their home matches at the venue in 1993. The following round, Cronulla saw off South Sydney 28–12 with two tries each to Brett Howland and Mat Rogers and tries for Jason Ferris and Jason Stevens. Cronulla came up against Brisbane for the second time in a fortnight and again defeated the defending premiers with a narrow 20–18 win at Shark Park. Tries to David Peachey, Brett Howland and Nathan Long helped secure the victory for Cronulla which kept them equal first on the ladder. However, Cronulla were lucky to come away with the two points as referee Paul Simpkins denied Chris Walker a penalty try just two minutes from full-time and then fullback Darren Lockyer missed a last minute sideline conversion which would have leveled the scores.

=== April ===
Round 5 saw Cronulla extend their unbeaten start to the season with a 20–16 victory over competition favourites the Melbourne Storm at Olympic Park. Tries to Russell Richardson, Andrew Ettingshausen and David Peachey ensured that the club remained at the top of the ladder and the only club to yet taste defeat. Round 6 saw Cronulla continue their impressive form with a 22–8 victory over Canterbury in front of a record crowd of 20,793 at Shark Park. Tries to David Peachey, Adam Dykes and Chris McKenna helped seal a convincing victory for Cronulla. Canterbury hooker Jason Hetherington was charged with a dangerous tackle on his opposite number Dean Treister which ruled him out of contention for the Anzac Test. Cronulla suffered their first loss of the season in round 7 at the hands of Penrith. Despite tries from Jason Stevens, Russell Richardson and Mat Rogers, Cronulla went down 18–16 at Penrith Football Stadium. Despite the club's first loss in the previous round, a record crowd of 22,279 (beating the previous record set just two rounds earlier) turned up to Shark Park to watch the local derby against St. George-Illawarra. The home side managed a narrow victory thanks to two tries from David Peachey and a try to Brett Howland. Aside from scoring two tries, Peachey also made two try-saving tackles as well as desperately chasing back to make sure Anthony Mundine did not score under the uprights. In the end that moment proved crucial as Wayne Bartrim hit the upright and therefore missed the opportunity to level the scores.

After the win over their local rivals Cronulla chairman Peter Gow was forced to resign two days after the match after he cut up a St. George-Illawarra jersey at a Cronulla Leagues Club restaurant and punched Barry Beath when confronted by the former international.

=== May ===
After the bye in round 9, Cronulla defeated South Sydney 27–14 at the Sydney Football Stadium with Mat Rogers, David Peachey, Brett Howland and Mitch Healey all bagging tries in a convincing victory. Both hookers, Shannon Donato from Cronulla and Sean Garlick from South Sydney, were sent to the sin bin by referee Bill Harrigan after an altercation between the two erupted. Both players were later suspended for two matches and one match respectively after an altercation in the players tunnel. The following round saw Cronulla take on St. George-Illawarra at Kogarah Oval for the second installment of the local derby. The Sharks ran out 20–12 winners after two tries from Brett Howland and a try to Chris McKenna helped secure the victory. Three players were sent to the sin-bin; Andrew Hart and Nathan Brown from St. George-Illawarra and Dean Treister from Cronulla. Referee Stephen Clark had to be escorted from the ground by police after a heated reception from the home crowd. A dramatic last minute field goal gave Cronulla victory in the following round as they defeated North Sydney 21–20. There was controversy around the incident though as there were claims that Andrew Ettingshausen impeded Mark Soden in his attempt to charge down the field goal. However, referee Stephen Clark missed the incident and so the field goal was awarded. Earlier, tries from David Peachey, Mitch Healey, Dean Treister and Andrew Pierce helped Cronulla towards victory.

The following day Queensland defeated New South Wales 9–8 in the first State of Origin match with debutant Mat Rogers scoring all the points for Queensland. Despite suffering a knee injury and being forced from the field, Rogers returned later in the match to score all of Queensland's points including a field goal (the first of his career) six minutes from the game's end to win the encounter. Chris McKenna and Martin Lang also played a part in the match for Queensland and Jason Stevens for New South Wales but there was no spot for fullback David Peachey. Despite his impressive performances throughout the season, Peachey was left out of the New South Wales squad in favour of Robbie Ross. Cronulla coach John Lang and captain Andrew Ettingshausen were both shocked at his omission from the squad.

Round 13 saw Cronulla suffer their second loss of the season at the hands of Newcastle as they went down 26–18. Tries from Russell Richardson, Andrew Ettingshausen and Sean Ryan couldn't prevent Newcastle from sending forward Paul Harragon out on a winning note in his farewell game. However, the match was overshadowed by a horror tackle from Daniel Smailes on Cronulla's Martin Lang that left the prop unconscious. Cronulla coach John Lang later claimed that the tackle had affected the outcome of the game. Smailes was later suspended for 7 matches for the incident. Two front-rowers, Cronulla's Jason Stevens and Newcastle's Tony Butterfield, were also charged by the judiciary. Stevens was hit with an 8 match ban while Butterfield escaped suspension. Referee Tim Mander and touch judge Paul Field were later dropped from officiating at first-grade level due to their failure to take appropriate action in regards to both the Smailes and Stevens incidents. The suspension for Stevens cost him a place in the New South Wales side and he was replaced by Michael Vella for the final two matches of the State of Origin series.

=== June ===
Cronulla defeated North Queensland 22–8 in the round 14 clash at Dairy Farmers Stadium thanks to two tries from Russell Richardson and tries to Andrew Ettingshausen and Sean Ryan. North Queensland centre Damien Smith became the first player since round 1 to be sent off after referee Bill Harrigan gave him his marching orders for a high tackle on Colin Best.

The second match in the State of Origin series occurred four days later at Stadium Australia with New South Wales winning the match 12–8. For the second consecutive game Mat Rogers scored all his side's points but of far more concern for Cronulla was that Rogers sustained another knee injury just as he had in the first match only this time in his other knee. Doctors later diagnosed the injury as a posterior cruciate rupture that would see Rogers ruled out for twelve weeks. The following day the club announced that they had extended coach John Lang's contract for another two seasons.

Two tries from Brett Howland as well as a try from Dean Treister wasn't enough for Cronulla in Round 15 as the club suffered their third defeat of the season after going down 32–14 against Sydney City at the Sydney Football Stadium. Cronulla trailed 18–6 at halftime and things went from bad to worse when Sean Ryan was sent off just after the interval. However, Sydney City forward David Barnhill was sent off just minutes later after a dangerous tackle on Dean Treister which would see him ruled out of contention for the State of Origin decider. Sydney City second-rower Bryan Fletcher was also sent from the field as he was sin binned. The following match saw Cronulla back to winning ways with a convincing 32–4 victory over Manly at Shark Park despite the absence of key forwards Martin Lang, Jason Stevens and Chris McKenna. Tries to Sean Ryan, Nick Graham, Brett Howland, Colin Best, Shannon Donato and Andrew Ettingshausen capped off a magnificent display. The afternoon was all about captain Ettingshausen though as he played his 300th game for the club - the first man to pass the milestone for the club. Already the all-time leading try scorer for Cronulla a try a minute from full-time brought his tally to 152 career tries which meant that he moved to equal third on the all-time competition try scorers list with Harold Horder. The club honoured his contribution to Cronulla with the unveiling of the newly named 'Andrew Ettingshausen Grandstand'.

The third and deciding State of Origin match occurred on 23 June with Queensland retaining the shield after an historic 10–10 draw. Despite not playing in the match due to a knee injury sustained in game 2, Mat Rogers finished as the series' top point scorer with 17 points.

Two days after the final Origin match, Cronulla were kept scoreless for the first time since their preliminary final loss to Manly in 1996 as they went down 22–0 to Parramatta.

=== July ===
Cronulla suffered their second consecutive loss as they went down 14–6 to Canterbury at Stadium Australia with forward Tim Maddison the lone try scorer for Cronulla. It was the club's fifth loss overall and their third defeat in four games. The club got back on the winners list in the following round as they comfortably defeated Canberra 24–8 at Shark Park. Winger Colin Best bagged himself a hat-trick in the space of 19 minutes while Andrew Pierce and Preston Campbell also scored tries. Cronulla won 22–20 against Auckland in the following round thanks to tries from Adam Dykes, David Peachey, Brett Howland and Colin Best. Despite trailing four times throughout the game, Cronulla managed to scrape through thanks to a try from Colin Best to level the scores and a sideline conversion from Mitch Healey to seal the victory six minutes from time. Several days after their victory over Auckland, club captain Andrew Ettingshausen predicted a merger between Cronulla and St. George-Illawarra at some stage in the near future. Two tries from Colin Best and a try from Sean Ryan couldn't prevent the club from suffering their first defeat at home as they were beaten 26–18 by Melbourne in the round 21. The following round saw a return to form with a comprehensive 40–8 victory against North Queensland at Shark Park. Two tries to Adam Dykes and Colin Best as well as tries to David Peachey, Sean Ryan, Paul Mellor and Brett Howland helped Cronulla ease to victory. To make matters worse for the visitors, Paul Green was sent off for North Queensland in the final few minutes.

=== August ===
Round 23 saw Cronulla score their biggest victory of the season with a 46–0 victory over Western Suburbs thanks to two tries each from Chris McKenna and Colin Best as well as tries from Brett Howland, David Peachey, Andrew Ettingshausen, Sam Isemonger and Russell Richardson. The win equaled the club's biggest ever victory which had been set in June 1994 against the Gold Coast. It was also the second time that Cronulla had kept an opposition team scoreless during the season. Western Suburbs second-rower Matthew Spence and Cronulla's Nathan Long were both sent to the sin-bin during the match by referee Matt Hewitt. On that same day it was announced that centre Russell Richardson had re-signed with the club for a further three seasons. Several days later former Cronulla chief executive Peter Gow, who had been forced to resign from the club earlier in the season, announced that he would be taking legal action against the club. The following round saw Cronulla continue their remarkable point scoring form with a 56–18 victory over North Sydney at North Sydney Oval. Hat-tricks to both David Peachey and Andrew Ettingshausen, a double to Brett Howland as well as tries to Adam Dykes and Chris McKenna sealed what was a record breaking scoreline for the club. It was the highest points tally that the club had ever wracked up in a match and was indeed the first time they had passed the half century mark in their history. However, it was to come at a cost with centre Russell Richardson, who had only recently extended his contract with the club, breaking down with a recurrence of a knee injury that would see him sidelined for around five weeks. After the bye in round 25, Cronulla wrapped up just their second ever minor premiership - the first coming in 1988 - with a comprehensive 38–6 victory against Penrith at Shark Park. A double to David Peachey in his 100th game for the club as well as tries to Colin Best, Andrew Ettingshausen, Brett Howland, Paul Mellor and Mat Rogers helped guide Cronulla to an important victory. After sealing the minor premiership, the players at the club offered to give up their share of the prize money if it would help retain the services of Jason Stevens.

At the Dally M Awards, coach John Lang won the Coach of the Year award while Mat Rogers was awarded the Representative Player of the Year. David Peachey was named Fullback of the Year and narrowly missed out on the Dally M Medal to Andrew Johns. Andrew Ettingshausen was also awarded the Ken Stephen Memorial Award at the NRL Grand Final Breakfast for his contribution to the game and the community. Peachey was also runner up to Johns in the Rugby League Week Player of the Year award.

=== September ===
The 1999 season saw the introduction of the McIntyre system for the finals. Before the finals series began, Cronulla announced that they had struck a deal with television channel Fox8 which would see the station's logo appear on the sleeves of the club's jersey during the finals. On 5 September at Shark Park, Cronulla won their quarter final clash with Brisbane 42–20 in a convincing display. Two tries from Adam Dykes and Mat Rogers as well as tries from David Peachey, Andrew Ettingshausen and Brett Howland ensured that Brisbane would not win back to back premierships. The win secured a week off and a spot in the preliminary final against the winner of the St. George-Illawarra and Sydney City match. St. George-Illawarra defeated Sydney City 28–18 to set up a third local derby of the season. Several days prior to the game Stadium Australia chief executive Chris Chapman announced that Andrew Ettingshausen was to be the rugby league ambassador for the venue.

Despite winning both of their previous meetings earlier in the season, Cronulla were eliminated from the competition after losing the preliminary final 24–8 against bitter rivals St. George-Illawarra. Despite the loss of Mat Rogers to a badly corked thigh early in the half, Cronulla appeared to be heading towards their first Grand Final since 1997 after a try to fullback David Peachey had given them a slender 8–0 lead going in at half-time. However, Anthony Mundine scored a second half hat-trick to send St. George-Illawarra through to a Grand Final meeting with Melbourne. Referee Stephen Clark was given high security after he reportedly received a threatening message on the day before the game.

On 30 September, Shane Webcke was ruled out for the Australian tri-nations squad after failing a medical and was replaced by Cronulla prop Jason Stevens. A day later it was announced that Stevens had extended his Cronulla contract for a further two years. Mat Rogers was also called up to the Australian squad after his impressive season and centre Russell Richardson was rewarded for his performances after he was given his Test debut for Australia in the opening match against New Zealand.

In early October, it was reported that Cronulla was still open to the idea of merging with the struggling South Sydney club in a proposed move that would possibly see the new club named the South Sydney Sharks. However, South Sydney president George Piggins reportedly rejected an offer from Barry Pierce to merge with Cronulla despite several South Sydney figures, including chief executive Mark Colley and former player Mike Cleary, calling for the merger to take place. David Miles, who had been playing in the reserves for Cronulla, signed for the Auckland in mid October. In late November, former South Sydney winger Christian Kerisiano was announced by the club as a new signing for the following season.

== Ladder ==
1999 NRL season
Pos	Team	Pld	W	D	L	B	PF	PA	PD	Pts
1	Cronulla-Sutherland Sharks	24	18	0	6	2	586	332	+254	40
2	Parramatta Eels	24	17	0	7	2	500	294	+206	38
3	Melbourne Storm (P)	24	16	0	8	2	639	392	+247	36
4	Sydney City Roosters	24	16	0	8	2	592	377	+215	36
5	Canterbury-Bankstown Bulldogs	24	15	1	8	2	520	462	+58	35
6	St. George Illawarra Dragons	24	15	0	9	2	588	416	+172	34
7	Newcastle Knights	24	14	1	9	2	575	484	+91	33
8	Brisbane Broncos	24	13	2	9	2	510	368	+142	32
9	Canberra Raiders	24	13	1	10	2	618	439	+179	31
10	Penrith Panthers	24	11	1	12	2	492	428	+64	27
11	Auckland Warriors	24	10	0	14	2	538	498	+40	24
12	South Sydney Rabbitohs	24	10	0	14	2	349	556	-207	24
13	Manly Warringah Sea Eagles	24	9	1	14	2	454	623	-169	23
14	North Sydney Bears	24	8	0	16	2	490	642	-152	20
15	Balmain Tigers	24	8	0	16	2	345	636	-291	20
16	North Queensland Cowboys	24	4	1	19	2	398	588	-190	13
17	Western Suburbs Magpies	24	3	0	21	2	285	944	-659	10

== Results ==
7 March 1999 Round 1	Cronulla-Sutherland Sharks	44 – 0	Balmain Tigers	Shark Park
	Tries: Sean Ryan (2); David Peachey; Mat Rogers; Brett Howland; Chris McKenna; Andrew Ettingshausen; Jason Ferris; Goals: Mat Rogers (6/8)	(Report)		Attendance: 8,186; Referee: Moghseen Jadwat

14 March 1999 Round 2	Brisbane Broncos	6 – 14	Cronulla-Sutherland Sharks	ANZ Stadium
	Tries: Shane Webcke; Goals: Michael De Vere (1/1)	(Report)	Tries: David Peachey; Paul Donaghy; Goals: Mat Rogers (3/5)	Attendance: 16,460; Referee: Stephen Clark

20 March 1999 Round 3	Cronulla-Sutherland Sharks	28 – 12	South Sydney Rabbitohs	Shark Park
	Tries: Brett Howland (2); Mat Rogers (2); Jason Ferris; Jason Stevens; Goals: Mat Rogers (2/6)	(Report)	Tries: Craig Wing; Brett Rodwell; Goals: Darrell Trindall (2/3)	Attendance: 18,126; Referee: Paul Simpkins

27 March 1999 Round 4	Cronulla-Sutherland Sharks	20 – 18	Brisbane Broncos	Shark Park
	Tries: David Peachey; Brett Howland; Nathan Long; Goals: Mat Rogers (3/3); Mitch Healey (1/1)	(Report)	Tries: Phillip Lee; Michael Hancock; Wendell Sailor; Goals: Darren Lockyer (3/4)	Attendance: 17,165; Referee: Paul Simpkins

4 April 1999 Round 5	Melbourne Storm	16 – 20	Cronulla-Sutherland Sharks	Olympic Park
	Tries: Paul Marquet; Ben Roarty; Scott Hill; Goals: Matt Geyer (2/3)	(Report)	Tries: Russell Richardson; Andrew Ettingshausen; David Peachey; Goals: Mat Rogers (4/4)	Attendance: 13,629; Referee: Stephen Clark

10 April 1999 Round 6	Cronulla-Sutherland Sharks	22 – 8	Canterbury-Bankstown Bulldogs	Shark Park
	Tries: David Peachey; Adam Dykes; Chris McKenna; Goals: Mat Rogers (5/6)	(Report)	Tries: Steven Hughes; Goals: Hazem El Masri (2/2)	Attendance: 20,793; Referee: Paul McBlane

17 April 1999 Round 7	Penrith Panthers	18 – 16	Cronulla-Sutherland Sharks	Penrith Football Stadium
	Tries: Peter Jorgensen; Ryan Girdler; Shane Elford; Goals: Ryan Girdler (3/4)	(Report)	Tries: Jason Stevens; Russell Richardson; Mat Rogers; Goals: Mat Rogers (2/3)	Attendance: 17,036; Referee: Tim Mander

25 April 1999 Round 8	Cronulla-Sutherland Sharks	18 – 16	St. George Illawarra Dragons	Shark Park
	Tries: David Peachey (2); Brett Howland; Goals: Mat Rogers (3/4)	(Report)	Tries: Nathan Blacklock; Anthony Mundine; Darren Treacy; Goals: Wayne Bartrim (2/4)	Attendance: 22,279; Referee: Sean Hampstead

7 May 1999 Round 10	South Sydney Rabbitohs	14 – 27	Cronulla-Sutherland Sharks	Sydney Football Stadium
	Tries: James Smith; Tim Brasher; Craig Wing; Goals: Julian O'Neill (1/3)	(Report)	Tries: Mat Rogers; David Peachey; Brett Howland; Mitch Healey; Goals: Mat Rogers (5/6); Field Goals: Mitch Healey	Attendance: 13,533; Referee: Bill Harrigan

14 May 1999 Round 11	St. George Illawarra Dragons	12 – 20	Cronulla-Sutherland Sharks	Kogarah Oval
	Tries: Anthony Mundine; Nathan Blacklock; Goals: Brad Mackay (1/1); Wayne Bartrim (1/1)	(Report)	Tries: Brett Howland (2); Chris McKenna; Goals: Mat Rogers (4/5)	Attendance: 16,514; Referee: Stephen Clark

23 May 1999 Round 12	Cronulla-Sutherland Sharks	21 – 20	North Sydney Bears	Shark Park
	Tries: David Peachey; Mitch Healey; Dean Treister; Andrew Pierce; Goals: Blaine Stanley (2/2); Mitch Healey (0/4); Field Goals: Mitch Healey	(Report)	Tries: Brett Dallas; Glenn Morrison; Joel Wilson; Goals: Jason Taylor (4/5)	Attendance: 10,843; Referee: Stephen Clark

30 May 1999 Round 13	Newcastle Knights	26 – 18	Cronulla-Sutherland Sharks	Marathon Stadium
	Tries: Robbie O'Davis (2); Darren Albert; Mark Hughes; Goals: Andrew Johns (5/6)	(Report)	Tries: Russell Richardson; Andrew Ettingshausen; Sean Ryan; Goals: Mitch Healey (3/4)	Attendance: 24,101; Referee: Tim Mander

5 June 1999 Round 14	North Queensland Cowboys	8 – 22	Cronulla-Sutherland Sharks	Dairy Farmers Stadium
	Tries: Kris Tassell; Brian Jellick; Goals: Noel Goldthorpe (0/1); Adam Connelly (0/1)	(Report)	Tries: Russell Richardson (2); Andrew Ettingshausen; Sean Ryan; Goals: Blaine Stanley (2/4); Mitch Healey (1/2)	Attendance: 16,372; Referee: Bill Harrigan

13 June 1999 Round 15	Sydney City Roosters	32 – 14	Cronulla-Sutherland Sharks	Sydney Football Stadium
	Tries: Robert Miles (2); Andrew Walker; Richie Barnett; Bryan Fletcher; Jack Elsegood; Goals: Andrew Walker (4/7)	(Report)	Tries: Brett Howland (2); Dean Treister; Goals: Blaine Stanley (1/4)	Attendance: 17,131; Referee: Stephen Clark

19 June 1999 Round 16	Cronulla-Sutherland Sharks	32 – 4	Manly-Warringah Sea Eagles	Shark Park
	Tries: Sean Ryan; Nick Graham; Brett Howland; Colin Best; Shannon Donato; Andrew Ettingshausen; Goals: Blaine Stanley (4/6)	(Report)	Tries: Andrew Frew; Goals: Adam Brown (0/1)	Attendance: 13,164; Referee: Bill Harrigan

25 June 1999 Round 17	Parramatta Eels	22 – 0	Cronulla-Sutherland Sharks	Parramatta Stadium
	Tries: Clinton Schifcofske (2); Luke Burt; Justin Morgan; Goals: Clinton Schifcofske (3/5)	(Report)		Attendance: 14,051; Referee: Paul McBlane

4 July 1999 Round 18	Canterbury-Bankstown Bulldogs	14 – 6	Cronulla-Sutherland Sharks	Stadium Australia
	Tries: Ricky Stuart (2); Hazem El Masri; Goals: Daryl Halligan (1/3)	(Report)	Tries: Tim Maddison; Goals: Mitch Healey (1/1)	Attendance: 20,173; Referee: Tim Mander

9 July 1999 Round 19	Cronulla-Sutherland Sharks	24 – 8	Canberra Raiders	Shark Park
	Tries: Colin Best (3); Andrew Pierce; Preston Campbell; Goals: Mitch Healey (2/5)	(Report)	Tries: Lesley Vainikolo; Luke Davico; Goals: Luke Williamson (0/2)	Attendance: 11,554; Referee: Stephen Clark

16 July 1999 Round 20	Auckland Warriors	20 – 22	Cronulla-Sutherland Sharks	Ericsson Stadium
	Tries: Lee Oudenryn; Stacey Jones; Robbie Mears; Goals: John Simon (4/4)	(Report)	Tries: Adam Dykes; David Peachey; Brett Howland; Colin Best; Goals: Mitch Healey (3/4)	Attendance: 8,144; Referee: Sean Hampstead

25 July 1999 Round 21	Cronulla-Sutherland Sharks	18 – 26	Melbourne Storm	Shark Park
	Tries: Colin Best (2); Sean Ryan; Goals: Mitch Healey (3/4)	(Report)	Tries: Stephen Kearney (2); Ben Anderson; Matt Geyer; Robbie Ross; Goals: Matt Geyer (3/5)	Attendance: 10,016; Referee: Bill Harrigan

31 July 1999 Round 22	Cronulla-Sutherland Sharks	40 – 8	North Queensland Cowboys	Shark Park
	Tries: Adam Dykes (2); Colin Best (2); David Peachey; Sean Ryan; Paul Mellor; Brett Howland; Goals: Blaine Stanley (3/5); Andrew Ettingshausen (1/2); Jason Ferris (0/1)	(Report)	Tries: Damien Smith; Goals: Noel Goldthorpe (2/2)	Attendance: 8,921; Referee: Moghseen Jadwat

7 August 1999 Round 23	Cronulla-Sutherland Sharks	46 – 0	Western Suburbs Magpies	Shark Park
	Tries: Chris McKenna (2); Colin Best (2); Brett Howland; David Peachey; Andrew Ettingshausen; Sam Isemonger; Russell Richardson; Goals: Mitch Healey (5/9)	(Report)		Attendance: 10,642; Referee: Matt Hewitt

14 August 1999 Round 24	North Sydney Bears	18 – 56	Cronulla-Sutherland Sharks	North Sydney Oval
	Tries: Scott Pethybridge; Glenn Morrison; Matt Seers; Goals: Jason Taylor (3/4)	(Report)	Tries: David Peachey (3); Andrew Ettingshausen (3); Brett Howland (2); Adam Dykes; Chris McKenna; Goals: Mat Rogers (8/10)	Attendance: 5,043; Referee: Sean Hampstead

28 August 1999 Round 26	Cronulla-Sutherland Sharks	38 – 6	Penrith Panthers	Shark Park
	Tries: David Peachey (2); Colin Best; Andrew Ettingshausen; Brett Howland; Paul Mellor; Mat Rogers; Goals: Mitch Healey (3/4); Mat Rogers (2/3)	(Report)	Tries: Ryan Girdler; Goals: Ryan Girdler (1/1)	Attendance: 16,606; Referee: Matt Hewitt

5 September 1999 Quarter Final	Cronulla-Sutherland Sharks	42 – 20	Brisbane Broncos	Shark Park
	Tries: Adam Dykes (2); Mat Rogers (2); David Peachey; Andrew Ettingshausen; Brett Howland; Goals: Mat Rogers (7/10)	(Report)	Tries: Kevin Walters; Darren Lockyer; Michael Hancock; Goals: Ben Walker (4/4)	Attendance: 17,713; Referee: Tim Mander

19 September 1999 Preliminary Final	Cronulla-Sutherland Sharks	8 – 24	St. George Illawarra Dragons	Stadium Australia
	Tries: David Peachey; Goals: Mat Rogers (1/1); Mitch Healey (1/1)	(Report)	Tries: Anthony Mundine (3); Luke Patten; Goals: Wayne Bartrim (4/4)	Attendance: 51,627; Referee: Stephen Clark
