= List of Cronulla-Sutherland Sharks representatives =

Including players from the Cronulla-Sutherland Sharks that have represented while at the club and the years they achieved their honours, if known. Representatives from the Cronulla-Sutherland Cobras are included as they are a feeder club.

== International ==
=== Australia ===
- (Australia) Ron Turner (1970, 1974)
- (Australia) Ken Maddison (1973)
- (Australia) Greg Pierce (1973, 1975, 1977–78)
- (Australia) David Waite (1974)
- (Australia) Steve Rogers (1975, 1978–79, 1981–82)
- (Australia) Steve Kneen (1978)
- (Australia) Andrew Ettingshausen (1988, 1990–94)
- (Australia) Gavin Miller (1988)
- (Australia) Mark McGaw (1988, 1990)
- (Australia) Dan Stains (1989)
- (Australia) Aaron Raper (1995)
- (Australia) Mat Rogers (1998–2000)
- (Australia) Russell Richardson (1999)
- (Australia) Jason Stevens (1999-02)
- (Australia) Chris McKenna (2000, 2002)
- (Australia) Brett Kimmorley (2002–05)
- (Australia) Phil Bailey (2003)
- (Australia) Greg Bird (2007–08)
- (Australia) Paul Gallen (2008–14)
- (Australia) Kade Snowden (2011)
- (Australia) Luke Lewis (2013, 2015)
- (Australia) Andrew Fifita (2013, 2017)
- (Australia) James Maloney (2016)
- (Australia) Valentine Holmes (2016–18)
- (Australia) Wade Graham (2017, 2019)
- (Australia) Aaron Woods (2018)
- (Australia) Nicho Hynes (2023)

=== Australia (SL) ===
- (Australia) Andrew Ettingshausen (1997)
- (Australia) Russell Richardson (1997)
- (Australia) Jason Stevens (1997)
- (Australia) Paul Green (1997)
- (Australia) Craig Greenhill (1997)
- (Australia) David Peachey (1997)

=== Cook Islands ===
- (Cook Islands) Tyrone Viiga (2013)
- (Cook Islands) Rea Pittman (2013)
- (Cook Islands) Kayal Iro (2022–23, 2025)

=== England ===
- (England) Jeff Grayshon (1977)
- (England) David Eckersley (1977)
- (England) Chris Heighington (2017)

=== Fiji ===
- (Fiji) Jayson Bukuya (2008, 2013, 2015, 2019)
- (Fiji) James Storer (2008)
- (Fiji) Junior Roqica (2014)
- (Fiji) Isaac Lumelume (2019)

=== Great Britain ===
- (United Kingdom) Tommy Bishop (1969)
- (United Kingdom) Mike Gregory (1987)

=== Greece ===
- (Greece) Billy Magoulias (2019)

=== Italy ===
- (Italy) Shannon Donato (1999)
- (Italy) Paul Franze (2004)
- (Italy) Andrew Dallalana (2004)
- (Italy) Jayden Walker (2016)

=== Lebanon ===
- (Lebanon) Hassan Saleh (2004)

=== New Zealand ===
- (New Zealand) Dane Sorensen (1977, 1979, 1983, 1985)
- (New Zealand) Kurt Sorensen (1983, 1985)
- (New Zealand) Richard Barnett (1995–97)
- (New Zealand) Tawera Nikau (1997)
- (New Zealand) Nigel Vagana (2004–06)
- (New Zealand) Luke Covell (2007)
- (New Zealand) Gerard Beale (2016–17)
- (New Zealand) Shaun Johnson (2019)
- (New Zealand) Briton Nikora (2019, 2022-23, 2025)
- (New Zealand) Braden Hamlin-Uele (2019)
- (New Zealand) Ronaldo Mulitalo (2022-23, 2025)

=== Papua New Guinea ===
- (Papua New Guinea) Paul Aiton (2010)
- (Papua New Guinea) James Segeyaro (2017–18)

=== Portugal ===
- (Portugal) Isaac De Gois (2007)

=== Samoa ===
- (Samoa) Brian Laumatia (1995)
- (Samoa) Hutch Maiava (2006)
- (Samoa) Phillip Leuluai (2007)
- (Samoa) Terence Seu Seu (2008–09)
- (Samoa) Misi Taulapapa (2008–09)
- (Samoa) Jack Afamasaga (2009)
- (Samoa) Mark Taufua (2013)
- (Samoa) Sam Tagataese (2013–14, 2016–17)
- (Samoa) Matthew Wright (2013)
- (Samoa) Penani Manumalealii (2013–14)
- (Samoa) Ricky Leutele (2014–16)
- (Samoa) Fa'amanu Brown (2016–17)
- (Samoa) Joseph Paulo (2017–18)
- (Samoa) Ronaldo Mulitalo (2019)
- (Samoa) Royce Hunt (2022-23)

=== Tonga ===
- (Tonga) Fraser Anderson (2008)
- (Tonga) Sam Moa (2008)
- (Tonga) Eddie Paea (2009)
- (Tonga) Atelea Vea (2009)
- (Tonga) Siosaia Vave (2010)
- (Tonga) Sosaia Feki (2013, 2015)
- (Tonga) Pat Politoni (2013, 2015)
- (Tonga) Anthony Tupou (2013)
- (Tonga) David Fifita (2015)
- (Tonga) Tony Williams (2017)
- (Tonga) Andrew Fifita (2017–19)
- (Tonga) Sione Katoa (2019, 2022, 2024-25)

=== United States ===
- (United States) Ronaldo Mulitalo (2019)

=== Wales ===
- (Wales) Allan Bateman (1995)
- (Wales) Tyson Frizell (2011)

== State of Origin ==
=== New South Wales ===
- (New South Wales) Steve Rogers (1980–82)
- (New South Wales) Gavin Miller (1983, 1989)
- (New South Wales) Andrew Ettingshausen (1987–94, 1996, 1998)
- (New South Wales) Mark McGaw (1987–88, 1990–91)
- (New South Wales) Jonathan Docking (1987–88)
- (New South Wales) Alan Wilson (1989)
- (New South Wales) Jason Stevens (2000–01, 2004)
- (New South Wales) David Peachey (2000)
- (New South Wales) Phil Bailey (2003)
- (New South Wales) Brett Kimmorley (2005, 2007)
- (New South Wales) Paul Gallen (2006–16)
- (New South Wales) Greg Bird (2007–08)
- (New South Wales) Trent Barrett (2009–10)
- (New South Wales) Kade Snowden (2010–11)
- (New South Wales) Todd Carney (2012)
- (New South Wales) Andrew Fifita (2013, 2015–17)
- (New South Wales) Luke Lewis (2013–14)
- (New South Wales) Michael Ennis (2015)
- (New South Wales) James Maloney (2016–17)
- (New South Wales) Jack Bird (2016–17)
- (New South Wales) Wade Graham (2016–17, 2019)
- (New South Wales) Matt Prior (2018)
- (New South Wales) Josh Morris (2019)
- (New South Wales) Siosifa Talakai (2022)
- (New South Wales) Nicho Hynes (2023-24)
- (New South Wales) Cameron McInnes (2024)
- (New South Wales) Addin Fonua-Blake (2026)
- (New South Wales) Blayke Brailey (2026)

=== New South Wales (SL) ===
- (New South Wales) Andrew Ettingshausen (1997)
- (New South Wales) David Peachey (1997)
- (New South Wales) Danny Lee (1997)
- (New South Wales) Sean Ryan (1997)

=== Queensland ===
- (Queensland) Paul Khan (1981)
- (Queensland) Dan Stains (1989–90)
- (Queensland) Craig Greenhill (1996)
- (Queensland) Martin Lang (1998-00)
- (Queensland) Mat Rogers (1999-00)
- (Queensland) Chris McKenna (1999-00, 2002)
- (Queensland) Chris Beattie (2001–02)
- (Queensland) Danny Nutley (2005)
- (Queensland) Valentine Holmes (2017–18)
- (Queensland) Briton Nikora (2026)

=== Queensland (SL) ===
- (Queensland) Mat Rogers (1997)
- (Queensland) Chris McKenna (1997)
- (Queensland) Paul Green (1997)
- (Queensland) Craig Greenhill (1997)
- (Queensland) Geoff Bell (1997)

== All Stars Match ==
=== Indigenous All Stars ===
- Blake Ferguson (2010)
- Andrew Fifita (2012–17, 2019, 2021–22)
- Ben Barba (2015–16)
- Wade Graham (2016–17, 2020)
- David Fifita (2016)
- Jack Bird (2017)
- Jesse Ramien (2020–22)
- Nicho Hynes (2022–24)
- William Kennedy (2022)
- Braydon Trindall (2022–24)

=== NRL All Stars/World All Stars ===
- (Australia) Anthony Tupou (2010)
- (Australia) Paul Gallen (2011–12, 2015)
- (Australia) Chris Heighington (2013)
- (Australia) Michael Ennis (2016)

=== Māori All Stars ===
- (Māori people) Briton Nikora (2020, 2022–24)
- (Māori people) Royce Hunt (2022)

== City vs Country Origin ==
=== NSW City ===
- (New South Wales) Jonathan Docking (1987–89)
- (New South Wales) Andrew Ettingshausen (1990–91, 1996)
- (New South Wales) Mark McGaw (1992)
- (New South Wales) Adam Ritson (1995)
- (New South Wales) Colin Best (2001)
- (New South Wales) Adam Dykes (2001)
- (New South Wales) Nick Graham (2002)
- (New South Wales) Jason Stevens (2003–05)
- (New South Wales) Paul Gallen (2006, 2017)
- (New South Wales) Lance Thompson (2006–07)
- (New South Wales) David Simmons (2006)
- (New South Wales) Ben Pomeroy (2007–09)
- (New South Wales) Reece Williams (2007)
- (New South Wales) Andrew Fifita (2013–15)
- (New South Wales) Wade Graham (2013, 2015)
- (New South Wales) Michael Lichaa (2014)
- (New South Wales) Chad Townsend (2016–17)
- (New South Wales) Joseph Paulo (2017)

=== NSW Country ===
- (New South Wales) Gavin Miller (1989)
- (New South Wales) Nick Graham (2002)
- (New South Wales) David Peachey (2003)
- (New South Wales) Brett Kimmorley (2004, 2007)
- (New South Wales) Luke Covell (2005)
- (New South Wales) Danny Lee (2006)
- (New South Wales) Greg Bird (2007)
- (New South Wales) Brett Kearney (2008)
- (New South Wales) Anthony Tupou (2009)
- (New South Wales) Kade Snowden (2010)
- (New South Wales) Jack Bird (2015–16)
- (New South Wales) Matt Prior (2017)

== Other honours ==
=== Prime Minister's XIII ===
- (Australia) Paul Gallen (2006–07)
- (Australia) Greg Bird (2007)
- (Australia) Ben Pomeroy (2007)
- (Australia) Luke Douglas (2007, 2010–11)
- (Australia) Kade Snowden (2010)
- (Australia) Wade Graham (2012, 2017, 2019)
- (Australia) Nathan Stapleton (2012)
- (Australia) Valentine Holmes (2017)
- (Australia) Jack Bird (2017)
- (Australia) James Maloney (2017)
- (Australia) Andrew Fifita (2017)
- (Australia) Jesse Ramien (2018)
- (Australia) Aaron Woods (2018)
- (Australia) Matt Prior (2018)
- (Australia) Chad Townsend (2018)
- (Australia) Nicho Hynes (2023)
- (Australia) Cameron McInnes (2023)

=== New Zealand Māori ===
- (Māori people) Chance Bunce (2008)

== Representative Captains ==
=== Test captains ===
Australia

- (Australia) Greg Pierce (1978)
- (Australia) Steve Rogers (1981)

Great Britain

- (United Kingdom) Tommy Bishop (1969)

Papua New Guinea

- (Papua New Guinea) James Segeyaro (2018)

=== Origin captains ===
New South Wales

- (New South Wales) Steve Rogers (1981)
- (New South Wales) Trent Barrett (2010) (Game 3)
- (New South Wales) Paul Gallen (2011–16)

=== City vs Country Origin captains ===
New South Wales City

- (New South Wales) Paul Gallen (2017)

=== Prime Minister's XIII captains ===
- (Australia) Wade Graham (2019)

== Representative Coaching Staff ==
=== International ===
Australia

- (Australia) John Lang (Coach - 1997)
- (Australia) Chris Anderson (Coach - 2002–03)
- (Australia) Ricky Stuart (Coach - 2007–08)

Australia (SL)

- (Australia) John Lang (Coach - 1997)
