= List of Cronulla-Sutherland Sharks records =

== Club records ==
=== Biggest wins ===
Margin	Score	Opponent	Venue	Date
66	66-0	Dolphins	Kayo Stadium	11 July 2026
62	62-0	Knights	Hunter Stadium	15 May 2016
62	68-6	Manly	Toyota Park	21 August 2005
52	58-6	Tigers	PointsBet Stadium	12 July 2024
50	64-14	Knights	Toyota Park	11 August 2002
46	46-0	Panthers	Caltex Field	5 June 1994
46	46-0	Panthers	Toyota Park	3 July 2010

=== Biggest losses ===
Margin	Score	Opponent	Venue	Date
70	4-74	Parramatta Eels	Parramatta Stadium	23 August 2003
44	10-54	Melbourne Storm	AAMI Park	11 June 2023
44	8-52	Newcastle Knights	Marathon Stadium	19 April, 2002

=== Most consecutive wins ===
- 15, 28 March 2016 - 24 July 2016
- Longest winning streak - 15 (2016)
- Most home wins in succession - 12 (8 April 1989 – 7 April 1990)
- Most away wins in succession: 6 (1995, 2016)
- Most wins in a season: 18 (1999)

=== Most consecutive losses ===
- 13, June 27, 2009 to March 29, 2010

=== Biggest crowds ===
- Biggest Toyota Park crowd: 23,302 (vs St George-Illawarra Dragons in 2004)
- Biggest crowd: 83,625 (vs Melbourne Storm, NRL Grand Final 2016)

=== Biggest comeback ===
Recovered from a 24-point deficit against the Sydney Roosters at the 31st minute.

- Trailed 24–6 at halftime to win 30–28 at Allianz Stadium on 5 July 2014

=== Worst collapse ===
Surrendered a 22-point lead.

- Led Melbourne Storm 22-0 after 32 minutes to lose 36-32 at Toyota Park on 16 March 2003

=== First match ===
vs Eastern Suburbs, Sydney Sports Ground - Sunday, 2 April 1967. Score: Cronulla won 11-5.

== Individual records ==
=== Most first grade games ===
- 348, Paul Gallen (2001–2019)
- 328, Andrew Ettingshausen (1983–2000)
- 255, Wade Graham (2011–2023)
- 232, David Peachey (1994–2005)
- 222, Mitch Healey (1989–2000)
- 216, Dane Sorensen (1977–1983, 1985–1989)
- 212, Danny Lee (1988–1998)
- 212, Andrew Fifita (2012–2022)
- 202, Steve Rogers (1973–1982, 1985)
- 187, David Hatch (1979–1990)

=== Most points for club ===
- 1,255 (82 tries, 502 goals, 5 field goals), Steve Rogers (1973–1982, 1985)
- 1,112 (75 tries, 406 goals), Mat Rogers (1995–2001)
- 948 (55 tries, 364 goals), Luke Covell (2005–2010)
- 912 (28 tries, 397 goals, 6 field goals), Nicho Hynes (2022–present)
- 666 (166 tries, 1 goal), Andrew Ettingshausen (1983–2000)
- 657 (17 tries, 303 goals), Barry Andrews (1971–1979)
- 520 (37 tries, 185 goals, 2 field goals), Alan Wilson (1986–1991, 1994)

=== Most tries for club ===
- 166, Andrew Ettingshausen (1983–2000)
- 110, David Peachey (1994–2005)
- 109, Ronaldo Mulitalo* (2019–)
- 93, Sione Katoa* (2018–)
- 82, Steve Rogers (1973–1982, 1985)
- 75, Mat Rogers (1995–2001)
- 67, Sosaia Feki (2013–2019)
- 66, Valentine Holmes (2014–2018)
- 63, Ray Corcoran (1968–1975)
- 63, Paul Gallen (2001–2019)
- 57, Jonathan Docking (1984–1991)
- 56, Colin Best (1998–2002, 2011–2012)

(*) player still active in the Cronulla Sharks team.

=== Rothmans Medal winners ===
- Terry Hughes (1968)
- Ken Maddison (1973)
- Steve Rogers (1975)
- Barry Russell (1988)
- Gavin Miller (1989) - co-winner
- Paul Green (1995)

=== Dally M Medal winners ===
- Steve Rogers (1981)
- Gavin Miller (1988)
- Gavin Miller (1989)
- Preston Campbell (2001)
- Nicho Hynes* (2022)

=== Player of the Year (Porter Gallen Medal) ===
Year	Player
2025	Addin Fonua-Blake
2024	Blayke Brailey
2023	Blayke Brailey
2022	Nicho Hynes
2021	Will Kennedy
2020	Shaun Johnson
2019	Chad Townsend
2018	Valentine Holmes
2017	Paul Gallen
2016	Matt Prior & Andrew Fifita
2015	Wade Graham
2014	Michael Gordon
2013	Michael Gordon
2012	Jeremy Smith
2011	Paul Gallen
2010	Paul Gallen
2009	Luke Douglas
2008	Paul Gallen
2007	Paul Gallen
2006	Greg Bird
2005	Danny Nutley
2004	Jason Stevens
2003	Danny Nutley
2002	Brett Kimmorley
2001	Adam Dykes
2000	David Peachey
1999	David Peachey
1998	Martin Lang
1997	David Peachey
1996	Paul Donaghy
1995	Danny Lee
1994	Andrew Ettingshausen
1992	Danny Lee
1991	Craig Dimond
1990	Andrew Ettingshausen
1989	Gavin Miller

== See also ==
- List of NRL records
