= 1998 Cronulla-Sutherland Sharks season =

- NRL rank: 11th
- 1998 record: Wins: 12; draws: 1; losses: 11
- Points scored: For: 438 (71 tries, 77 goals); against: 387 (68 tries, 57 goals, 1 field goal)

Team information
- Coach: John Lang
- Captain: Andrew Ettingshausen Mitch Healey David Peachey
- Stadium: Shark Park
- Avg. attendance: 11,370

Top scorers
- Tries: Brett Howland (13)
- Goals: Mat Rogers (56)
- Points: Mat Rogers (148)
← 1997	1999 →

The 1998 Cronulla-Sutherland Sharks season was the 32nd in the club's history. They competed in the NRL's inaugural season. Despite reaching the grand final of the Super League half of the previous season, they failed to make the finals of the re-unified competition.

== Ladder ==
	Team	Pld	W	D	L	PF	PA	PD	Pts
1	Brisbane	24	18	1	5	688	310	+378	37
2	Newcastle	24	18	1	5	562	381	+181	37
3	Melbourne	24	17	1	6	546	372	+174	35
4	Parramatta	24	17	1	6	468	349	+119	35
5	North Sydney	24	17	0	7	663	367	+296	34
6	Sydney City	24	16	0	8	680	383	+297	32
7	Canberra	24	15	0	9	564	429	+135	30
8	St. George	24	13	1	10	486	490	-4	27
9	Canterbury	24	13	0	11	489	411	+78	26
10	Manly-Warringah	24	13	0	11	503	473	+30	26
11	Cronulla-Sutherland	24	12	1	11	438	387	+51	25
12	Illawarra	24	11	1	12	476	539	-63	23
13	Balmain	24	9	1	14	381	463	-82	19
14	Penrith	24	8	2	14	525	580	-55	18
15	Auckland	24	9	0	15	417	518	-101	18
16	North Queensland	24	9	0	15	361	556	-195	18
17	Adelaide	24	7	0	17	393	615	-222	14
18	South Sydney	24	5	0	19	339	560	-221	10
19	Gold Coast	24	4	0	20	289	654	-365	8
20	Western Suburbs	24	4	0	20	371	802	-431	8
