= 1997 Super League (Australia) season =

Rugby league competition

1997 Super League
- Teams: 10
- Premiers: Brisbane (3rd title)
- Minor premiers: Brisbane (2nd title)
- Matches played: 96
- Points scored: 4,035
- Average attendance: 13,039
- Total attendance: 1,251,777
- Top points scorer: Ryan Girdler (197)
- Wooden spoon: North Queensland Cowboys (2nd spoon)
- Top try-scorer: Matthew Ryan (17)

The 1997 Super League season (also known as the Telstra Cup due to sponsorship by Telstra) was a breakaway professional rugby league football competition in Australia and the only one to be run by the News Limited-controlled Super League organisation. Eight teams which had broken away from the existing Australian Rugby League, in addition to the newly created Adelaide Rams and Hunter Mariners, competed over eighteen weekly rounds of the regular season. The top five teams then played a series of knock-out finals which culminated in a September grand final played in Brisbane between Brisbane and Cronulla.

== Background ==
Super League was a rugby league competition that was held in Australia in 1997. It was created by News Corporation after an unsuccessful attempt to purchase the pay television rights to Australian rugby league games. After two years of legal battles the competition was played for a single season in 1997 before merging with the rival Australian Rugby League competition in 1998 to form the National Rugby League.

== Season summary ==
For this season video refereeing was introduced to rugby league for the first time. The Telstra Cup premiership was held over eighteen rounds. The season was dominated by the minor premiers, the Brisbane Broncos, who won 14 of their 18 matches, losing only to the Penrith Panthers, the Hunter Mariners and eventual runners-up, Cronulla. The Grand final was played at Brisbane's Queensland Sport & Athletics Centre in front of 58,912 people; the ground record for that venue. Brisbane defeated Cronulla 26–8 to win their third* premiership. The Auckland Warriors had teams in the Reserve grade and two age-group grand finals but lost all three.

The grand finals:

- Brisbane vs Cronulla (Main/Top Grade)
- Canterbury vs Auckland (Reserve Grade)
- Penrith vs Auckland (Under-19s Grade)
- Brisbane vs Auckland (Under-17s Grade)

The winners in all grades were:

- Brisbane (Main/Top Grade)
- Canterbury (Reserve Grade)
- Penrith (Under-19s Grade)
- Brisbane (Under-17s Grade)

The Main/Top Grade and the Reserve Grade were called the Telstra Cup
The Under-19s Grade was called the Mal Meninga Cup
The Under-17s Grade was called the Terry Lamb Cup

At the end of the season, an Australian team was selected from the Telstra Cup Premiership's clubs to play in the Super League Test series against Great Britain in England.

The test matches

- Australia vs New Zealand
- Australia vs Great Britain
- New Zealand vs Great Britain

The Super League Tri Series

- Queensland vs New South Wales
- Queensland vs New Zealand
- New South Wales vs New Zealand

=== Super League (Australia) Teams ===
The ten Super League-aligned clubs contested the premiership, only three of which were based in Sydney (none of which were NSWRFL foundation clubs), compared to eight in the rival Australian Rugby League competition, which was run at the same time. A further team from greater New South Wales, two teams from Queensland, and one each from Australian Capital Territory, South Australia, Western Australia and Auckland in New Zealand made up the Super League competition. The Western Reds renamed themselves the Perth Reds for the Super League competition. The Bulldogs reinstated 'Canterbury' to their name (but not Bankstown).

=== Teams ===
Team	Nickname	Colours	Jersey	Season	Home Ground	Coach	Captain
Adelaide	Rams			1st season	Adelaide Oval	Rod Reddy	Kerrod Walters
Auckland	Warriors			3rd season	Mt. Smart Stadium	John Monie	Greg Alexander
Brisbane	Broncos			10th season	QEII Stadium	Wayne Bennett	Allan Langer
Canberra	Raiders			16th season	Bruce Stadium	Mal Meninga	Laurie Daley
Canterbury	Bulldogs			45th season	Parramatta Stadium	Chris Anderson	Simon Gillies
Cronulla	Sharks			40th season	Endeavour Field	John Lang	Andrew Ettingshausen
Hunter	Mariners			1st & Final season	Topper Stadium	Graham Murray	Tony Iro
North Queensland	Cowboys			3rd season	Stockland Stadium	Tim Sheens	Ian Roberts & John Lomax
Perth	Reds			3rd & Final season	WACA Ground	Dean Lance	Mark Geyer
Penrith	Panthers			40th season	Penrith Stadium	Royce Simmons	Steve Carter

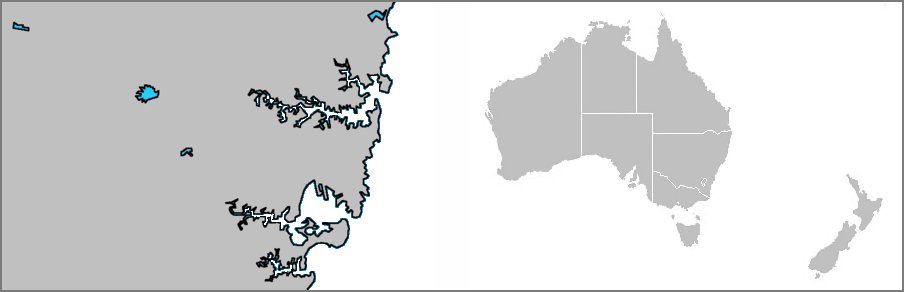
Locations of the participating clubs: in the Sydney area (left), Australia and New Zealand (right)

=== Advertising ===
Teaser ads had been created by Mojo Sydney in 1996 around the theme of "Superleague: It's Coming". They featured Super League players performing superhuman feats. One notable execution included Canberra's Bradley Clyde inside a rodeo corral being stormed by a runaway bull with the suggestion that he is about to singlehandedly bring the bull to ground.

By season launch in 1997 Foxtel's ad agency Young and Rubicam Sydney had the Super League account and created a space-themed ad with players running through outer-space and the tag-line "Super League: It's out of this world".

Super League Television commercials featured the song Two Tribes by Frankie goes to Hollywood

By mid season the account had moved again and Sydney agency VCD produced much of the game promotional and club fixture print ads that ran in newspapers throughout the season. This commenced VCD's association with Super League that would continue with the ARL post the re-unification.

=== Ladder ===
Pos	Team	Pld	W	D	L	PF	PA	PD	Pts
1	Brisbane Broncos (P)	18	14	1	3	481	283	+198	29
2	Cronulla Sharks	18	12	0	6	403	230	+173	24
3	Canberra Raiders	18	11	0	7	436	337	+99	22
4	Canterbury Bulldogs	18	10	0	8	453	447	+6	20
5	Penrith Panthers	18	9	0	9	431	462	-31	18
6	Hunter Mariners	18	7	0	11	350	363	-13	14
7	Auckland Warriors	18	7	0	11	332	406	-74	14
8	Perth Reds	18	7	0	11	321	456	-135	14
9	Adelaide Rams	18	6	1	11	303	402	-99	13
10	North Queensland Cowboys	18	5	2	11	328	452	-124	12

- (P) - Premiers

=== Ladder progression ===
- Numbers highlighted in green indicate that the team finished the round inside the top 5.
- Numbers highlighted in blue indicates the team finished first on the ladder in that round.
- Numbers highlighted in red indicates the team finished in last place on the ladder in that round

	Team	1	2	3	4	5	6	7	8	9	10	11	12	13	14	15	16	17	18
1	Brisbane	2	4	6	8	10	12	14	14	16	18	19	19	19	21	23	25	27	29
2	Cronulla	2	4	6	6	6	8	8	8	10	10	12	14	16	16	18	20	22	24
3	Canberra	0	0	0	0	2	2	4	6	8	10	12	14	14	16	16	18	20	22
4	Canterbury	2	2	4	4	4	6	8	10	10	12	14	14	16	16	18	20	20	20
5	Penrith	2	4	6	8	8	10	10	12	12	12	12	14	16	16	16	16	18	18
6	Hunter	0	0	0	2	2	2	4	6	6	6	8	10	12	14	14	14	14	14
7	Auckland	0	2	2	2	4	6	6	6	6	6	6	6	6	8	10	10	12	14
8	Perth	0	2	2	4	6	6	8	8	8	10	10	12	12	12	12	14	14	14
9	Adelaide	0	0	2	4	4	4	4	6	8	9	9	9	11	11	11	11	11	13
10	North Queensland	2	2	2	2	4	4	4	4	6	7	8	8	8	10	12	12	12	12

== Finals ==
Minor premiers Brisbane only played two finals games (including the grand final), both against Cronulla winning both convincingly.

Home	Score	Away	Match Information
Home	Score	Away	Date and Time	Venue	Referee	Crowd
Preliminary Semi-finals
Cronulla	22–18	Canberra	30 August 1997	Endeavour Field	Bill Harrigan	17,137
Canterbury	14–15	Penrith	1 September 1997	Belmore Oval	Graham Annesley	10,492
Major Qualifying Finals
Brisbane	34–2	Cronulla	6 September 1997	Stockland Stadium	Bill Harrigan	26,256
Canberra	32–12	Penrith	8 September 1997	Bruce Stadium	Graham Annesley	10,153
Preliminary final
Cronulla	10–4	Canberra	13 September 1997	Endeavour Field	Bill Harrigan	17,638
Grand final
Brisbane	26-8	Cronulla	20 September 1997	Queensland Sport & Athletics Centre	Bill Harrigan	58,912

=== Bracket ===
Qualifying final
2	Cronulla	22
3	Canberra	18
4	Canterbury	14
5	Penrith	15

Major semi-final
1	Brisbane	34
Cronulla	2
Minor semi-final
Canberra	32
Penrith	12

Preliminary final
Cronulla	10
Canberra	4

Grand final
Brisbane	26
Cronulla	8

== Grand final ==
The Super League Grand final crowned a week of festivities, including a ball, street parade and massive game-night fireworks display, of the sort the Broncos' management had wanted the ARL to bring to Brisbane before the code's big schism in 1995. The game was on 20 September and despite stormy weather, a record crowd in Queensland rugby league history was at Queensland Sport & Athletics Centre for the first ever night grand final and the first Australian top level grand final to be played outside Sydney. It attracted a ground record of 58,912 people, the first 50,000+ crowd for a Rugby League Grand Final in Australia since 50,201 attended the 1987 Winfield Cup Grand Final, the last to be played at the Sydney Cricket Ground. It was also the largest attendance for any sporting event in Brisbane since 52,000 attended the opening ceremony of the 1982 Commonwealth Games, also held at the venue, then known as the Queen Elizabeth II Stadium. Jon Stevens and Olivia Newton-John also performed in the pre-match entertainment.

The match was broadcast live by Australian Pay-TV channel Fox Sports with Greg Clark, Wally Lewis and Gary Freeman providing commentary, with Peter Jackson on the sideline. It was also broadcast on delay on the Nine Network with commentary provided by Ray Warren and Peter Sterling.

=== Teams ===
Team details
Brisbane Broncos		Position	Cronulla Sharks
Name	Number	Position	Number	Name
Darren Lockyer	1	FB	21	David Peachey
Michael De Vere	18	WG	45	Mat Rogers
Steve Renouf	3	CE	3	Andrew Ettingshausen (c)
Anthony Mundine	4	CE	33	Russell Richardson
Wendell Sailor	5	WG	17	Geoff Bell
Kevin Walters	6	FE	6	Mitch Healey
Allan Langer (c)	7	HB	7	Paul Green
Brad Thorn	10	PR	8	Danny Lee
Andrew Gee	23	HK	9	Dean Treister
Shane Webcke	21	PF	40	Jason Stevens
Gorden Tallis	11	SR	11	Craig Greenhill
Peter Ryan	12	SR	31	Chris McKenna
Darren Smith	13	LK	13	Tawera Nikau
Tonie Carroll	15	IN	18	Adam Dykes
John Plath	9	IN	24	Sean Ryan
Michael Hancock	2	IN	38	Les Davidson
Ben Walker	16	IN	12	Nathan Long
Wayne Bennett		Coach		John Lang
RLP

=== Match details ===
1997 Super League Telstra Cup Grand Final

Saturday, 20 September
20:00 AEST (UTC+10)

Brisbane	26 – 8	Cronulla
Tries: 4 Renouf 34', 55', 65'; Hancock 79'; Goals: 5 Lockyer pen 8', pen 25', 35', 56', 80' (5/6)	1st: 10–2; 2nd: 16–6; Report	Tries: 1 Richardson 45'; Goals: 2 Rogers pen 22', 46' (2/2)

Queensland Sport & Athletics Centre, Brisbane
Attendance: 58,912
Referee: Bill Harrigan (Australia)
Player of the Match: Steve Renouf (Brisbane)

The game was refereed by Bill Harrigan. The talented Brisbane side, featuring young up-and-coming stars in Darren Lockyer, Gorden Tallis and Shane Webcke overwhelmed a game Cronulla-Sutherland side. No points were scored until Lockyer's penalty kick in the eighth minute. In the twenty-second minute Mat Rogers equalised with another penalty kick. About three minutes later the next points came from yet another penalty kick by Lockyer, making the score 4–2 in favour of the home side. With just under seven minutes of the first half remaining, Allan Langer put a bomb up and into the Sharks left-hand corner which a leaping Rogers failed to secure and Steve Renouf picked up the ball and dived over for the first try of the match. Lockyer's conversion put the Broncos in front 10–2 which is what the score remained at for half-time.

Cronulla scored after less than four minutes of the second half when Wendell Sailor, returning the ball from a kick deep into his side's territory, passed the ball to nobody and it was chipped ahead by a Cronulla chaser and dived on by Russell Richardson. Mat Rogers converted the try successfully bringing the deficit back to two points at 10–8. In the 55th minute, the Broncos were on the attack and moved the ball out to the left for Renouf to score his second try of the match. Lockyer's kick, a metre in from the sideline was successful, making Brisbane's lead 16–8. About 10 minutes later, Renouf scored close to the same spot, becoming only the third player in history to score a hat-trick in a grand final. Lockyer missed the kick so the Broncos lead 20–8 with 14 minutes of the match remaining. An attempted field-goal kick by Lockyer in the 78th minute was charged down but Brisbane re-gathered the ball and one tackle later it was put through the hands out to the right wing, for replacement Michael Hancock to score the final try of the game. Lockyer kicked the extra two points with only seconds of the game remaining, so the final score was 26–8.

The win meant the Broncos were undefeated at Queensland Sport & Athletics Centre all year and it kept the Broncos' 100% record intact in grand finals making it three from three, while the Sharks remained bridesmaids, at the time yet to score a grand final victory from three appearances. They would remain without a grand final win for another 20 years until their drought was finally broken in 2016.

=== Post game ===
A Super Bowl style match between the Brisbane Broncos and Newcastle Knights, the 1997 ARL season's premiers was mooted, but did not eventuate.

== Postseason ==
With twenty-two teams playing in two competitions in 1997 crowd attendances and corporate sponsorships were spread very thinly, and many teams found themselves in financial difficulty by the end of the season. Despite having the financial backing of Optus, the Australian Rugby League decided that it was not in the best interests of the game to run two competitions and undertook moves to approach News Limited in order to form a united competition. As a consequence of the negotiations that followed, on 23 September 1997 the ARL announced that it was forming a new competition in partnership with News Limited. The National Rugby League was formed from the ARL and Super League competitions.

It was announced that the 1998 season would have 20 teams competing, 19 of the ARL and Super League teams and the Melbourne Storm, who were owned by News Limited. Some of the clubs on both sides of the war were shut down. News decided to close the Hunter Mariners and the financially ruined Western/Perth Reds, who were $10million in debt at the end of 1997, while the ARL decided to close down the South Queensland Crushers, who were also in financial trouble. Additionally, at the end of the following season News Limited would decide to close down the Adelaide Rams and the ARL would close down the Gold Coast Chargers, even though they were one of the few clubs to make a profit during the Super League war.

== See also ==
- 1997 World Club Championship
- Brisbane Broncos 1997
- Super League Tri-series
- Super League (Australia)
- Super League War
