= 1997 Cronulla-Sutherland Sharks season =

- SL rank: 2nd
- 1997 record: Wins: 14; draws: 0; losses: 8
- Points scored: For: 445 (75 tries, 72 goals, 1 field goal); against: 312 (50 tries, 55 goals, 2 field goals)

Team information
- Coach: John Lang
- Captain: Andrew Ettingshausen Mitch Healey
- Stadium: Shark Park
- Avg. attendance: 13,558

Top scorers
- Tries: Mat Rogers (14)
- Goals: Mat Rogers (70)
- Points: Mat Rogers (196)
← 1996	1998 →

The 1997 Cronulla-Sutherland Sharks season was the 31st in the club's history and they competed in Super League's 1997 Telstra Cup premiership. Coached by John Lang and captained by Andrew Ettingshausen and Mitch Healey, they reached the Grand Final in which they were defeated by the Brisbane Broncos.

== Ladder ==
Pos	Team	Pld	W	D	L	PF	PA	PD	Pts
1	Brisbane Broncos (P)	18	14	1	3	481	283	+198	29
2	Cronulla Sharks	18	12	0	6	403	230	+173	24
3	Canberra Raiders	18	11	0	7	436	337	+99	22
4	Canterbury Bulldogs	18	10	0	8	453	447	+6	20
5	Penrith Panthers	18	9	0	9	431	462	-31	18
6	Hunter Mariners	18	7	0	11	350	363	-13	14
7	Auckland Warriors	18	7	0	11	332	406	-74	14
8	Perth Reds	18	7	0	11	321	456	-135	14
9	Adelaide Rams	18	6	1	11	303	402	-99	13
10	North Queensland Cowboys	18	5	2	11	328	452	-124	12

- (P) - Premiers
