= 1996 Cronulla-Sutherland Sharks season =

- ARL rank: 5th
- 1996 record: Wins: 16; draws: 2; losses: 6
- Points scored: For: 441 (75 tries, 70 goals, 1 field goal); against: 320 (55 tries, 48 goals, 4 field goals)

Team information
- Coach: John Lang
- Captain: Andrew Ettingshausen Mitch Healey Les Davidson
- Stadium: Shark Park
- Avg. attendance: 10,515

Top scorers
- Tries: Ryan Metreson (47)
- Goals: Mat Rogers (59)
- Points: Mat Rogers (150)
← 1995	1997 →

The 1996 Cronulla-Sutherland Sharks season was the 30th in the club's history. They competed in the ARL's 1996 Optus Cup premiership and came within one match of the grand final.

== Ladder ==
	Team	Pld	W	D	L	PF	PA	PD	Pts
1	Manly-Warringah	22	18	0	4	549	191	+358	36
2	Brisbane	21	17	0	4	607	263	+344	34
3	North Sydney	22	15	2	5	598	325	+273	32
4	Sydney City	22	15	1	6	521	321	+200	31
5	Cronulla-Sutherland	21	14	2	5	399	268	+131	30
6	Canberra	21	13	1	7	538	384	+154	27
7	St. George	21	12	1	8	443	360	+83	27
8	Western Suburbs	22	12	1	9	394	434	−40	25
9	Newcastle	21	10	1	10	416	388	+28	23
10	Canterbury	21	11	0	10	375	378	−3	22
11	Auckland	21	10	0	11	412	427	−15	22
12	Balmain	22	11	0	11	319	459	−140	22
13	Parramatta	21	9	1	11	404	415	−11	21
14	Illawarra	22	8	0	14	403	444	−41	16
15	Penrith	21	7	1	13	363	464	−101	15
16	Western Reds	21	6	1	14	313	420	−107	13
17	North Queensland	21	6	0	15	288	643	−355	12
18	Gold Coast	22	5	1	16	359	521	−162	11
19	South Sydney	22	5	1	16	314	634	−320	11
20	South Queensland	21	3	0	18	220	496	−276	8
