= Sam Isemonger =

Australian rugby league footballer

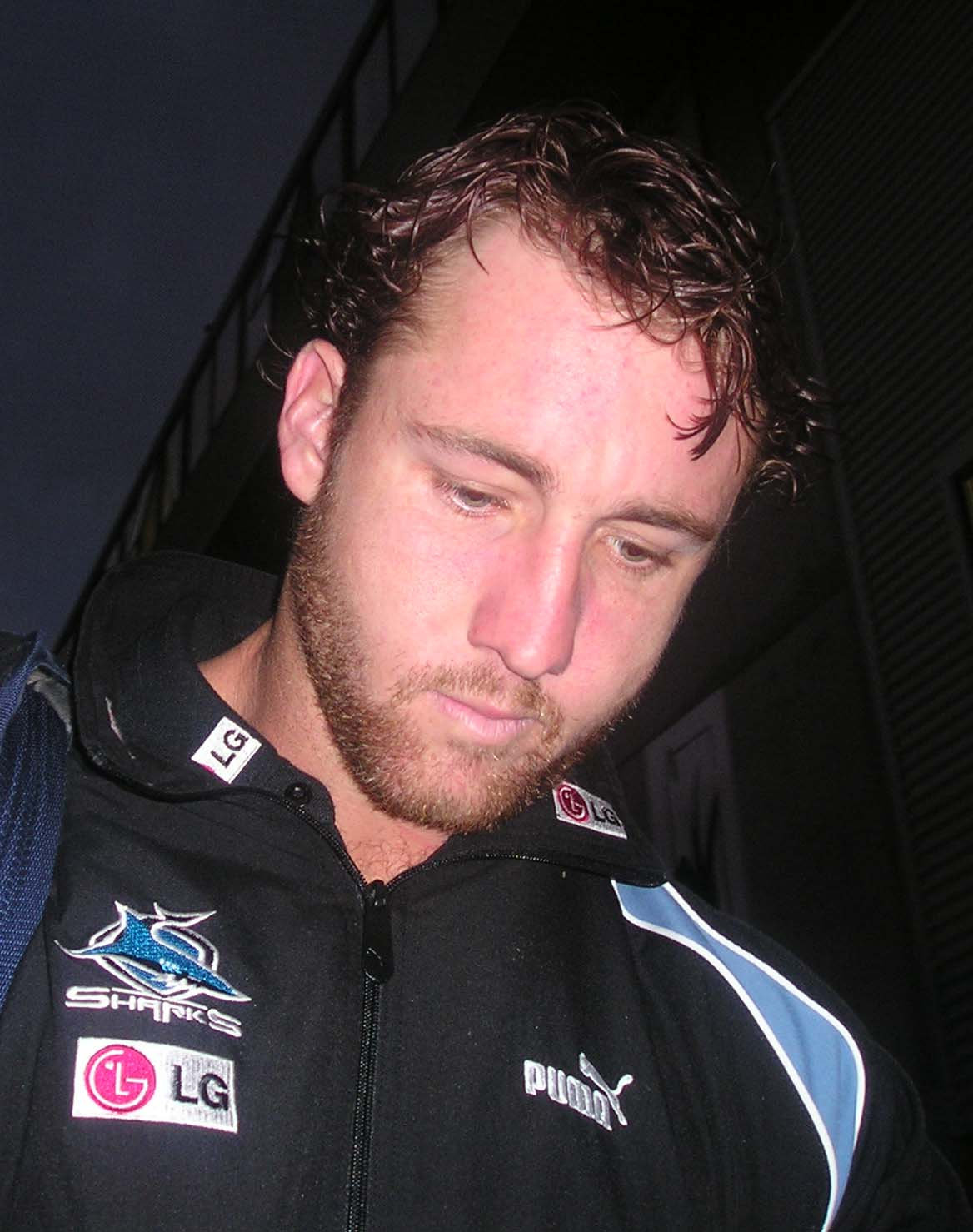

Personal information
- Full name: Sam Isemonger
- Born: 4 May 1978 (age 48) Sutherland, New South Wales, Australia

Playing information
- Height: 183 cm (6 ft 0 in)
- Weight: 100 kg (15 st 10 lb; 220 lb)
- Position: Second-row, Lock, Prop
Club
Years	Team	Pld	T	G	FG	P
1998–05	Cronulla Sharks	74	9	0	0	36
2006–07	St. George Illawarra	21	1	0	0	4
	Total	95	10	0	0	40

Sam Isemonger (born 4 May 1978 in Sutherland, New South Wales) is an Australian former professional rugby league footballer who played in the 1990s and 2000s. He played most of his professional career for the Cronulla-Sutherland Sharks in the National Rugby League, making 74 appearances over 8 seasons, before spending his last 2 NRL seasons with the St George Illawarra Dragons. His position of choice was the second-row.

Isemonger is the son of the rugby league footballer who played in the 1970s for the Cronulla-Sutherland Sharks; David Isemonger.

== Early life ==
Isemonger grew up in the Sutherland Shire and began playing rugby league at an early age for his local club side Como Jannali Rugby League Football Club. He spent all of his early years playing C grade for Como Jannali after an unsuccessful stint playing basketball with the Sutherland Pirates. He was eventually signed by the Cronulla-Sutherland Sharks while still a teenager.

== Career ==
=== 1998 ===
After signing with Cronulla, Isemonger eventually made his first grade debut on 10 July 1998 at the age of twenty against the Parramatta Eels.

=== 1999-2005 ===
Over the next several years, Isemonger was both in and out of the first grade team with the Sharks for a variety of reasons; originally having to compete with representative players such as Chris McKenna, Tawera Nikau, Les Davidson and Danny Lee meant a first team position was more often than not hard to come by. With several senior players moving on as the years passed Isemonger was able to get more game time but again hit a stumbling block with two knee reconstructions in 2001 and 2002.

After eight seasons with Cronulla in which he made a total of seventy-four appearances, Isemonger was subsequently released from his contract by new coach Stuart Raper.

=== 2006–present ===
After being released by Cronulla, Isemonger signed on to local rivals the St George Illawarra Dragons for the beginning of the 2006 NRL season.

Isemonger retired in 2007 and took to coaching his junior club the Como Jannali Crocodiles under the watchful eye of close friend and lifelong mentor Kev McDermott. "I'm so glad to finally return to a life of danger with the Como Crocs." He said at the time.
