= Escape with ET =

Australian fishing TV series

- Genre: Fishing show
- Presented by: Andrew Ettingshausen
- Country of origin: Australia
- Original language: English
- No. of seasons: 18

Production
- Running time: 60 minutes

Original release
- Network: Nine Network (1997–2004); Network Ten (2005–present)
- Release: 1997 – present

Escape with ET is an Australian fishing show. It is hosted by Andrew Ettingshausen. Its main focus is on fishing, though it also focuses on many water sports (such as white water rafting and wakeboarding), off-road 4WD driving and other outdoors activities.

Escape with ET screened on Nine Network from 1997 to 2004 and moved to Network Ten in 2005.

== Reception ==
Bruce Elder of The Sydney Morning Herald called Escape with ET "a good snappy local program", "The segments are short and to the point", and "the stories are sensible and impart practical suggestions for interesting holidays".

== See also ==
- List of longest-running Australian television series
