= Russell Richardson =

Australia international rugby league footballer

Personal information
- Full name: Russell Richardson
- Born: 12 February 1977 (age 49) Dubbo, New South Wales, Australia

Playing information
- Height: 183 cm (6 ft 0 in)
- Weight: 93 kg (14 st 9 lb)
- Position: Centre
Club
Years	Team	Pld	T	G	FG	P
1996–01	Cronulla-Sutherland	92	33	0	0	132
2002–03	South Sydney	22	8	0	0	32
2004	Newcastle Knights	7	1	0	0	4
	Total	121	42	0	0	168
Representative
Years	Team	Pld	T	G	FG	P
1997	Australia (SL)	2	0	0	0	0
1999	Australia	1	1	0	0	4

Russell Richardson (born 12 February 1977 in Dubbo, New South Wales) is an Australian former professional rugby league footballer who played in the 1990s and 2000. An Australian international representative centre, he played his club football for the Newcastle Knights, South Sydney Rabbitohs and the Cronulla-Sutherland Sharks in the National Rugby League competition.

== Playing career ==
Richardson made his first grade debut for Cronulla-Sutherland against South Queensland in Round 11 1996.

Richardson scored Cronulla's sole try in the 1997 Telstra Cup Premiership's Grand Final loss to Brisbane. In the 1997 post season, Richardson was selected to play for Australia from the interchange bench in two matches of the Super League Test series against Great Britain.

In the 1999 Tri-Nations series, game 1, he was a starting Centre for the Australians against New Zealand, scoring a try. Also in 1999, Richardson made 16 appearances for the club as they finished as minor premiers and reached the preliminary final against St George. Richardson played at centre in the match as Cronulla took a half time lead but fell away in the second half to lose 24–8.

In 2002, Richardson joined South Sydney and played in the club's first game since readmission which was a 40–6 loss against arch rivals the Sydney Roosters. Souths finished second last in their first season back in the NRL and were only saved from the wooden spoon due to Canterbury's salary cap breaches. In 2003, Richardson made 6 appearances as Souths finished last on the table. In 2004, Richardson joined Newcastle and played one season for the club before retiring.
