= Blaine Stanley =

Australian rugby league footballer

Personal information
- Born: 28 September 1978 (age 48) Wellington, New South Wales, Australia

Playing information
- Position: Halfback, Five-eighth
Club
Years	Team	Pld	T	G	FG	P
1998–00	Cronulla Sharks	28	7	26	0	80
2002	South Sydney	7	1	3	0	10
	Total	35	8	29	0	90

Blaine Stanley (born 28 September 1978) is an Australian former professional rugby league footballer who played for Cronulla and South Sydney in the National Rugby League (NRL).

== Biography ==
Stanley, an Indigenous Australian from Wellington, New South Wales, played as a halfback and occasionally at five-eighth.

From 1998 to 2000 he made 28 first-grade appearances for Cronulla in the NRL. In a game against North Queensland in 2000 he scored a career high 22 points, with two tries and seven goals.

In the 2002 NRL season he joined South Sydney, which were returning to the league following a two-year expulsion. He featured in seven first-grade games.

Released by South Sydney after one season, Stanley returned home to play for Wellington.
