= Dean Treister =

Australian rugby league footballer

Personal information
- Full name: Dean Treister
- Born: 19 December 1975 (age 50) Canterbury, Sydney, New South Wales, Australia

Playing information
- Position: Hooker
Club
Years	Team	Pld	T	G	FG	P
1995–03	Cronulla Sharks	161	16	0	0	96
2003	Hull FC	17	3	0	0	12
	Total	178	19	0	0	108
- Source: As of 21 January 2019

Dean Treister (born 19 December 1975) is an Australian former rugby league footballer who played in the 1990s, and 2000s. A member of the Cronulla-Sutherland Sharks team, Treister played many games for the club from 1993 to 2003, including the 1997 Super League Grand Final. His position of choice was hooker. As a Cronulla Sharks local junior, Dean was part of the famous 1994 Presidents Cup winning team and played 161 first grade games between 1995 and 2003 where he scored 16 tries and played in the hooker position. He finished his career in England where he played 1 season for Hull FC. Throughout his time at the Cronulla-Sutherland Sharks he was a favourite amongst the fans. Treister was known for his creative ability in attack and his ability to control the game.

== Playing career ==
Treister lived in Melbourne until he was 13 before moving to Cronulla where he took up rugby league. A local Cronulla junior, he impressed playing for De La Salle Caringbah to earn selection for the Sharks junior representative teams and made his first-grade debut in 1995 after winning the President's Cup premiership in 1994.

In 1996, Cronulla finished 5th on the table and reached the preliminary final before being defeated by Manly 24–0 with Treister starting at hooker. In 1997, Cronulla signed with the rival super league competition at the height of the super league war. Cronulla reached the 1997 super league grand final but were defeated by Brisbane 26–8.

In 1999, Cronulla enjoyed their best season on the field since being admitted into the competition by winning the minor premiership. Treister also enjoyed one of his best seasons for the club making the preliminary final against St George. Treister played in the match that saw Cronulla lead at half time but suffered a second half collapse to lose 24–8.

In 2002, Cronulla finished 5th on the table and reached their 4th preliminary final in 8 years as they played against the New Zealand Warriors. Treister played at hooker in the match as Cronulla suffered another heartbreaking exit losing 16–10.

Treister joined Hull FC part way through the 2003 NRL Season after being dropped to reserve grade alongside fellow club stalwart Nick Graham by new coach Chris Anderson. It was reported that his demotion to reserve grade occurred as a result of club politics, with a rumoured falling out between himself and the coach the alleged cause.

== Post playing ==
Treister has been living in the United States since he retired and is married with 3 children.
