= Sean Ryan (rugby league) =

Australian rugby league footballer

Personal information
- Full name: Sean Ryan
- Born: 23 August 1973 (age 53)

Playing information
- Height: 6 ft 1 in (186 cm)
- Weight: 16 st 5 lb (104 kg)
- Position: Second-row
Club
Years	Team	Pld	T	G	FG	P
1992–01	Cronulla Sharks	128	19	0	0	76
2002–03	Hull FC	56	9	0	0	36
2004	Castleford Tigers	17	2	0	0	8
	Total	201	30	0	0	120
Representative
Years	Team	Pld	T	G	FG	P
1997	New South Wales (SL)	1	0	0	0	0

Sean Ryan (born 23 August 1973) is an Australian former professional rugby league footballer who played in the 1980s and 1990s. He played for the Cronulla-Sutherland Sharks in the Australian National Rugby League (NRL) competition and Hull FC and the Castleford Tigers in the Super League. He primarily played in the second-row.

Ryan was selected to represent New South Wales as a second-row for game I of the Super League's 1997 Tri-Series.
