= Nathan Long (rugby league) =

Australian rugby league footballer

Personal information
- Full name: Nathan Long
- Born: 20 May 1973 (age 53) Cronulla, New South Wales, Australia

Playing information
- Height: 184 cm (6 ft 0 in)
- Weight: 100 kg (15 st 10 lb)
- Position: Second-row, Prop
Club
Years	Team	Pld	T	G	FG	P
1994–01	Cronulla-Sutherland	139	8	0	0	32
2002	Northern Eagles	11	1	0	0	4
2003	Manly-Warringah	2	0	0	0	0
2004	St. George Illawarra	1	0	0	0	0
	Total	153	9	0	0	36
Representative
Years	Team	Pld	T	G	FG	P
2002	NSW City	1	0	0	0	0

Nathan Long (born 20 May 1973) is an Australian former rugby league footballer. He played for the Cronulla-Sutherland Sharks, Northern Eagles, Manly-Warringah Sea Eagles and the St. George Illawarra Dragons as a second-row forward.

== Playing career ==
Long made his first grade debut for Cronulla against Balmain in Round 10 of the 1994 season. In 1996, Cronulla finished 5th and reached the preliminary final against Manly before losing 24–0 with Long featuring in the match. The following year, Cronulla joined the rival super league competition and reached the grand final against Brisbane which ended in a 26–8 defeat with Long playing off the bench.

In 1999, Long was a member of the Cronulla side which claimed the minor premiership and were one of the favourites to take out the premiership along with Parramatta and St. George Illawarra. Cronulla reached the preliminary final but were defeated 24–8 against St. George Illawarra after leading at half time.

In 2001, Long made 19 appearances as Cronulla finished 4th on the table. Cronulla reached the preliminary final against Newcastle but were defeated by the eventual premiers.

In 2002, Long joined the now defunct side Northern Eagles. After the dissolution of Northern Eagles, Long was signed by Manly-Warringah in 2003. In 2004, Long joined St. George Illawarra and played one game for the club before retiring.
