= Steve Clark (referee) =

Australian rugby league referee

Personal information
- Full name: Steven Clark
- Born: New South Wales, Australia

Refereeing information
Years	Competition	Apps
1992–07	NSWRL/ARL/NRL	314
2005	City vs Country Origin	1
1999–06	State of Origin	5
1996–06	Test matches	8
2000	World Cup	2

Steven Clark is a former Australian professional referee in the National Rugby League competition.

== Background ==
Clark was born in New South Wales, Australia.

== NRL career ==
Clark made his first grade debut in the match between Parramatta Eels and the Newcastle Knights, at Parramatta Stadium on 31 May 1992. In 2007 Clark reached the 300 first grade game barrier becoming only the third referee to do so. At the time of his retirement only Bill Harrigan with 393 games and Col Pearce with 343 games had refereed more matches than him.

== Representative honours ==
Clark made his representative refereeing debut in 1996, when he officiated the Test match between Great Britain and New Zealand.

In 2005 he controlled in his one and only City vs Country Origin match at Northpower Stadium in Gosford.

Clark made his first State of Origin appearance in 1999, refereeing two matches including the first ever drawn match in Game III. He didn't referee again until the 2005 series where he was appointed to Game II. In the following series he controlled Games II and III.
