= Shannon Donato =

Former Italy international rugby league footballer

Personal information
- Born: 3 April 1975 (age 51) Sydney, New South Wales, Australia

Playing information
- Height: 175 cm (5 ft 9 in)
- Weight: 87 kg (13 st 10 lb)
- Position: Hooker
Club
Years	Team	Pld	T	G	FG	P
1995–97	South Sydney	19	3	0	0	12
1999–01	Cronulla Sharks	34	3	0	0	12
2002–05	Penrith Panthers	25	0	0	0	0
	Total	78	6	0	0	24
Representative
Years	Team	Pld	T	G	FG	P
1999	Italy	2	0	0	0	0

Shannon Donato (born 3 April 1975) is an Australian former professional rugby league footballer who played for the South Sydney Rabbitohs, Cronulla-Sutherland Sharks and the Penrith Panthers. He also played for Italy. His position of choice was at hooker.

== Background ==
Shannon Donato was born in Sydney, New South Wales, Australia

== South Sydney ==
Donato was a Rabbitohs junior and made his first grade debut in Round One, 1995. He went on to play in 19 games for the Rabbitohs over the next three seasons.

== Cronulla-Sutherland ==
In 1998 Donato moved to the Sharks, seeking to become established as a starting hooker. However he only made one appearance for the club in 1998, starting in Round 21, after joining the Club mid season. His 1999 season was more successful as he played in 14 games.

At the end of the 1999 season Donato represented Italy in the first Mediterranean Cup.

Over the next two seasons Donato played in 19 more games.

== Penrith ==
Donato moved to the Panthers in 2002, one of several players who followed coach John Lang from Cronulla. He played in 25 games for the club over four seasons, his career's later years being marred by injury. In particular his 2003 season was only 80 minutes long after breaking his hand ten minutes into a semi-final appearance. This injury ruined his 2004 season and he did not play a game.

He retired at the end of the 2005 season.

== Life after League ==
After retiring Donato moved into the back office for the Panthers. He worked as the Panthers Marketing & Chief Commercial Officer.

Donato returned to his first club, the South Sydney Rabbitohs as Chief Commercial Officer and in February 2016 he became the Acting Chief Executive Officer.
