= Nick Graham (rugby league) =

Australian rugby league footballer

Personal information
- Full name: Nick Graham
- Born: 1 October 1974 (age 52) Sydney, New South Wales, Australia
- Height: 185 cm (6 ft 1 in)
- Weight: 98 kg (216 lb; 15 st 6 lb)

Playing information
- Position: Lock, Second-row
Club
Years	Team	Pld	T	G	FG	P
1992–03	Cronulla-Sutherland	134	16	0	0	64
2003	Wigan Warriors	14	2	0	0	8
2004	Wests Tigers	10	0	0	0	0
	Total	158	18	0	0	72
Representative
Years	Team	Pld	T	G	FG	P
2002	City Origin	1	0	0	0	0
- Source: RLP As of 22 January 2019

Nick Graham (born 1 October 1974) is an Australian former rugby league footballer who played as a lock and second-row forward in the 1990s and 2000s.

He played for the Wests Tigers and the Cronulla-Sutherland Sharks in the NRL. He also played for the Wigan Warriors in the Super League.

== Background ==
Graham was born in Caringbah, New South Wales, Australia.

== Playing career ==
Graham was a club stalwart at the Sharks during the late 1990s, and up until the arrival of Chris Anderson at the club at the beginning of 2002. Graham was controversially axed by Anderson alongside fellow Sharks club stalwart Dean Treister only five matches into the 2003 season. While Treister left the club to play for Hull F.C. in the UK, Graham decided to stay at the club and try to win back his first-grade spot, unsuccessfully.

He later left during the 2003 season to play for the Wigan Warriors in the English Super League for the duration of the year. He returned to Australia and played his final season for the Wests Tigers in 2004. After featuring in only 10 matches, Graham decided to retire at the season's end.

== Representative games ==
- City: Played one game for city in Country/City Origin

== Career highlights ==
- Junior Club: De La Salle (Cronulla)
- Career Stats: 145 career games to date scoring 16 tries
