= Brett Howland =

Australian rugby league footballer

Personal information
- Full name: Brett Howland
- Born: 13 June 1976 (age 50) Sydney, New South Wales, Australia
- Height: 189 cm (6 ft 2 in)
- Weight: 97 kg (15 st 4 lb)

Playing information
- Position: Wing, Fullback
Club
Years	Team	Pld	T	G	FG	P
1997–00	Cronulla-Sutherland	68	38	0	0	152
2001	Bulldogs	12	3	0	0	12
2003–05	Penrith Panthers	30	8	0	0	32
	Total	110	49	0	0	196

Brett Howland (born 13 June 1976 in Sydney, New South Wales) is an Australian former professional rugby league footballer who played in the 1990s and 2000s. He played for the Penrith Panthers in the National Rugby League competition. He previously played for the Cronulla-Sutherland Sharks but was forced out due to the salary cap. His position of choice was at wing, although he was also known to play at fullback.

== Playing career ==
Nicknamed "The Whippet” due to his long, wiry frame, Howland was a Cronulla junior and made his first-grade debut for Cronulla-Sutherland in the 1997 Super League competition. In 1999, Howland enjoyed his best season as a player, scoring 18 tries in 26 games. The season was also the best on record for Cronulla at the time, as they won the minor premiership for the first time since 1988, and were favorites to win their first premiership since being admitted into the premiership in 1967. Cronulla backed up this claim by defeating the Brisbane Broncos 42–20 in the qualifying final. In the preliminary final against the St. George Illawarra Dragons, Cronulla led at half-time, but ended up losing the match 24–8 with Howland playing on the wing.

In 2000, Cronulla finished eighth on the table and were eliminated in the first week of the finals by Brisbane, with Howland again playing on the wing.

In 2001, Howland joined the Bulldogs and played 12 games for the club in his first season. In 2002, Howland didn't feature in any first-grade games for the Bulldogs, but did play in the premiership-winning reserve-grade team.

In 2003, Howland joined the Penrith Panthers but was not included in the 2003 premiership-winning line-up. As 2003 NRL premiers, Penrith traveled to England to face Super League VIII champions, the Bradford Bulls in the 2004 World Club Challenge. Howland played on the wing in Penrith's 22–4 loss. Howland played two further seasons for Penrith and retired at the end of the 2005 season.

== Career highlights ==
- Junior Club: Gymea Gorillas
- Career Stats: 110 career game, scoring 49 tries
