= Paul Mellor =

Australian rugby league footballer & referee

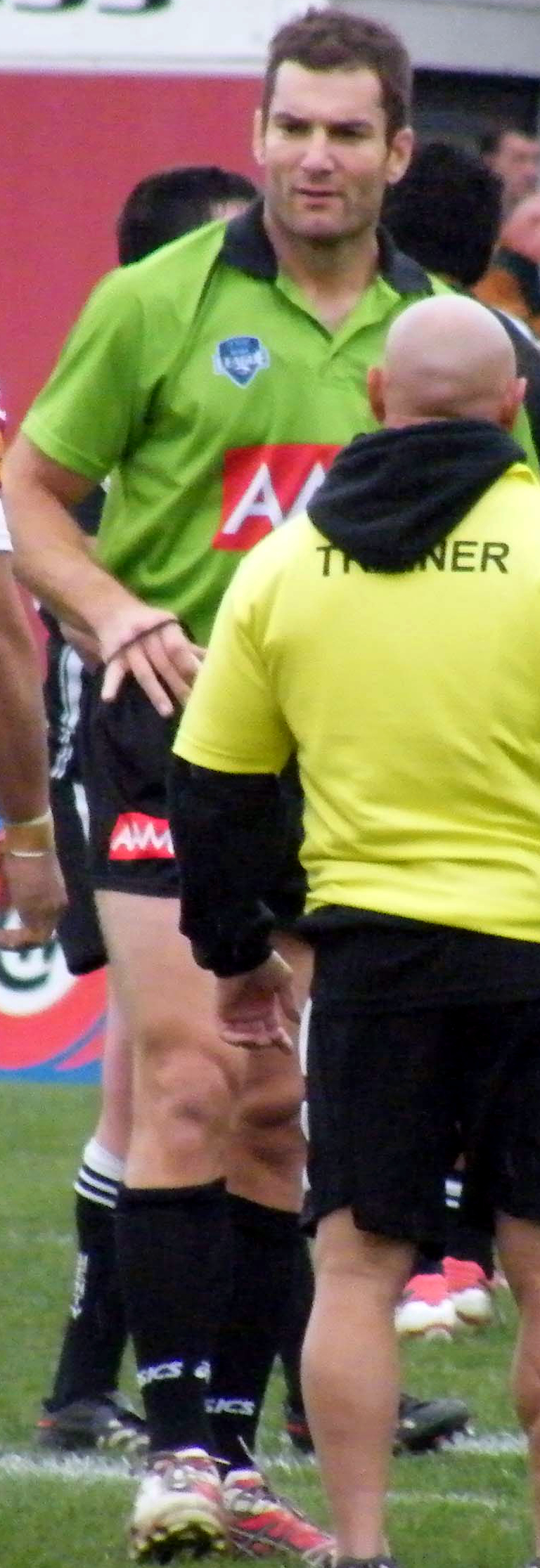
- Mellor in 2009

Personal information
- Full name: Paul Mellor
- Born: 21 August 1974 (age 52) Sydney, New South Wales, Australia

Playing information
- Height: 190 cm (6 ft 3 in)
- Weight: 105 kg (16 st 7 lb)
- Position: Centre, Wing, Second-row
Club
| Years | Team | Pld | T | G | FG | P |
|---|---|---|---|---|---|---|
| 1991–96 | South Sydney | 71 | 30 | 0 | 0 | 120 |
| 1997–98 | Canterbury Bulldogs | 10 | 2 | 0 | 0 | 8 |
| 1999–02 | Cronulla Sharks | 89 | 34 | 0 | 0 | 136 |
| 2003–04 | Castleford Tigers | 40 | 18 | 0 | 0 | 72 |
| 2005 | Cronulla Sharks | 15 | 9 | 0 | 0 | 36 |
| 2006–07 | South Sydney | 36 | 15 | 0 | 0 | 60 |
| | Total | 261 | 108 | 0 | 0 | 432 |

Paul Mellor (born 21 August 1974 in Sydney, New South Wales) is an Australian former professional rugby league footballer who played in the 1990s and 2000s. He played for four different Sydney NRL clubs and in Britain before retiring at the end of the 2007 season. He primarily played on the wing, or as a centre.

== Early career ==
A South Sydney District Junior Rugby Football League from the Matraville Tigers Club, Mellor is the youngest Rabbitoh in history having made his first grade début at the age of 16 years and 10 months on 30 June 1991 against the Gold Coast Chargers.

== Career ==
Mellor played 17 seasons at the highest level, spanning 221 NRL games and scoring 90 tries. He played for South Sydney, the Canterbury-Bankstown Bulldogs, Cronulla-Sutherland Sharks and Castleford in the UK. Mellor finished as South Sydney's top try scorer in the 1994 and 1996 seasons. Mellor played for Souths in their upset 1994 Tooheys Challenge Cup final victory over Brisbane.

Whilst at Cronulla, Mellor was part of the 1999 Cronulla side which won the minor premiership and were one of the favourites to take out the competition before losing to rivals St George in the preliminary final by a score of 24-8 at Stadium Australia. Mellor would go on to experience further preliminary final heartbreak with Cronulla in 2001 and 2002.

Mellor signed for Castleford for the 2003 and 2004 season of Super League. Mellor was utilised in the centre and second row but in the 2004 season moved to the wing and improved his form.

== Retirement ==
Mellor played his final game of Rugby League in the 2007 Qualifying Final against the Manly Warringah Sea Eagles on 8 September 2007 at Brookvale Oval, electing to retire from the game at the conclusion of the 2007 season.

== Refereeing ==
Since retirement from playing, Mellor took up refereeing. He regularly appears as the video referee in NRL matches.

== Personal life ==
Mellor does a lot of work with South Sydney Juniors, helping to bring through the next generation of young players. He also helps coach his sons' teams in the Cronulla junior league.

Mellor was schooled at Marist Brothers in Pagewood, completing his Higher School Certificate before studying a Bachelor of Human Movement at the Australian Catholic University. He has also completed a level strength and conditioning course through the Rabbitohs.

== Career highlights ==
- Junior Club: Matraville Tigers
- First Grade Debut: Round 14, Souths v Gold Coast at the Sydney Football Stadium, 30 June 1991
- First Grade Record: 261 appearances scoring 108 tries
- NRL Minor premiership winner with Cronulla in 1999
