= Danny Lee (rugby league) =

Australian rugby league footballer

Personal information
- Full name: Danny Lee
- Born: 17 February 1965 (age 61) Lismore, New South Wales, Australia

Playing information
- Position: Prop
Club
Years	Team	Pld	T	G	FG	P
1988–98	Cronulla-Sutherland	212	13	0	0	52
1999	Gateshead	18	0	0	0	0
	Total	230	13	0	0	52
Representative
Years	Team	Pld	T	G	FG	P
1997	New South Wales	1	0	0	0	0
1996	NSW Country	1	0	0	0	0
- Source: As of 22 January 2019

Danny Lee (born 17 February 1965) is an Australian former rugby league footballer. He played most of his football at prop and was a member of the Cronulla-Sutherland Sharks NRL team from 1988 to 1998. He also played a stint later in his career at Gateshead Thunder in England.

== Playing career ==
Danny Lee, was born in Lismore, 1965. An uncompromising defender, Lee sparked interest from his future club when he represented Country Firsts in 1987 whilst playing for Lismore Marist Brothers. Lee joined the Cronulla Sutherland Sharks the following year making his first grade debut coming off the bench in the round 18 win against the Gold Coast/Tweed Heads Giants. Lee would go onto play a further 6 games that year winning the minor premiership and started in the preliminary final loss to the Balmain Tigers 9-2.

Over the next 10 seasons, Lee would go onto play 212 games for the Sharks, the fifth most games for the club.

Lee's achievements between 1995 and 1997 included; the Dally M prop of the year in 1995; 1996 saw another preliminary final loss and selection in the 1996 NSW Country team steered by Andrew Johns and Captain Laurie Daley which defeated the Brad Fittler led NSW City team 18-16; (Super League) 1997 saw his NSW debut in the Super League Tri Series, selection on the Super League Australian tour of Great Britain (without playing a game) and a grand final appearance in the 26 – 8 loss to the Brisbane Broncos.

Lee finished his career playing 1 season in the English Super League with Gateshead Thunder which in turn was their only season as a club.

== Sources ==
- Danny Lee at sharksforever.com
- Danny Lee at nrlstats.com
- Danny Lee at stats.rleague.com
- "Lee brings the beach life to Thunder road". The Independent. 18 April 1999.
