= Andrew Ettingshausen =

Australia international rugby league footballer

Andrew 'ET' Ettingshausen
Personal information
- Full name: Andrew Ettingshausen
- Born: 29 October 1965 (age 61) Sutherland, New South Wales, Australia

Playing information
- Height: 182 cm (6 ft 0 in)
- Weight: 83 kg (13 st 1 lb)
- Position: Fullback, Centre, Wing
Club
Years	Team	Pld	T	G	FG	P
1983–00	Cronulla-Sutherland	328	165	1	0	662
1986–89	Leeds	41	30	0	0	120
	Total	369	195	1	0	782
Representative
Years	Team	Pld	T	G	FG	P
1988–96	NSW City	8	4	0	0	16
1987–98	New South Wales	27	7	0	0	28
1988–94	Australia	25	14	0	0	56
1997	New South Wales (SL)	3	3	0	0	12
1997	Australia (SL)	4	0	0	0	0

Andrew Ettingshausen (born 29 October 1965) is an Australian former professional rugby league footballer who played in the 1980s, 1990s, and early 2000s. Nicknamed "ET", he played his first grade Australian club football for the Cronulla-Sutherland Sharks, retiring at the end of the 2000 NRL season having played 328 games for the club, the NSWRL/ARL/SL/NRL record for most games at a single club. This record stood for ten years, before ultimately being broken by Darren Lockyer for the Broncos in 2010.

He represented both New South Wales, and the Australian Kangaroos, and was twice a Kangaroo tourist. After his retirement from league in 2000, Ettingshausen went on to host and produce a fishing television show titled Escape with ET.

Ettingshausen made his début for Cronulla at the age of 17, while still at school. He quickly cemented a place in the Sharks' first grade side and played 328 first grade games with the club over eighteen seasons. Ettingshausen was inducted into the NRL Hall of Fame in 2008.

== Early life ==
Ettingshausen was signed as a junior to the Cronulla-Sutherland Sharks.

While attending Cronulla De La Salle, Ettingshausen played for the Australian Schoolboys team in 1982 and 1983.

== Club career ==
=== 1983 ===
Cronulla coach Terry Fearnley gave Ettingshausen his first grade début for the Sharks in round 5 of the 1983 season against the Newtown Jets at Fullback. His début was somewhat of an uneventful affair, although he did cross for a try in the second half.

=== 1985–91 ===
In the 1985 season, he scored a total of nine tries playing mostly from fullback or in the centres in his third season and finally cemented his spot in the Sharks squad.

Ettingshausen also made an appearance in the 1988 Australian television movie The First Kangaroos, which depicted the 1908–09 Kangaroo tour of Great Britain. Also having a small role in the movie was his NSW teammate and captain Wayne Pearce.

In 1987, Ettingshausen made his début for New South Wales on the wing in Game 1 of the 1987 State of Origin series at Lang Park in Brisbane.

The 1988 season was the high point of his early years when he was moved off the wing and into the centres where he would remain for the majority of his career. He made the first of eight appearances for City Origin in 1988, playing on the wing in City's 20-18 win over Country Origin in the annual City vs Country Origin match. He then went on to be one of the better players for NSW in the 1988 Origin series which Queensland won 3-0. Off the back of these performances Ettingshausen was selected for his first test match for Australia.

After a successful 1990 NSWRL season in which he played fullback in all three Origin games for NSW which saw The Blues win the series for the first time since 1986, and after scoring 13 tries in 20 games for Cronulla, he was selected for the 17th Kangaroo Tour of Great Britain and France where he played in all five tests on tour against Great Britain and France. Ettingshausen came of age on tour, playing in 12 games and finishing as the highest try scorer for the 28-man touring squad with 15, including hat-tricks against powerhouse English sides St. Helens and Wigan in the opening two games. It was these efforts which cemented his place in the first test against Great Britain at Wembley Stadium where the home side pulled off a shock 19-12 win, their first test win on home soil against Australia since the second test of the 1978 Kangaroo tour. Despite the loss, Australia bounced back and secured The Ashes with wins at Old Trafford and Elland Road with Ettingshausen scoring his only try of the test series in the 14-0 win in the deciding test.

=== 1992–2000 ===
Despite a slow start to the 1992 NSWRL season playing fullback for the Sharks, Ettingshausen was picked at fullback for NSW for all three games of the 1992 Origin series which saw NSW win 2-1. He was then picked at fullback for all three tests against Great Britain in The Ashes.

He was selected on the wing for NSW for games 1 and 2 of the 1993 Origin series, and at centre for game 3. He missed Australian selection for the 1st test of their two test tour of New Zealand & was selected on the reserves bench for the 2nd test played in Palmerston North. For the 3rd test back in Brisbane he was again a reserve.

1994 saw Ettingshausen back at his best, seeing him score a total of 18 tries from just 18 games and leading the Sharks by example after also being awarded the captaincy of the Sharks. Five of his 18 tries came in one match against South Sydney at The Sharks home ground, Endeavour Field in Round 22 as the Sharks humiliated the Rabbitohs 42-0. With his 3rd try against Manly-Warringah in Round 5 (his 6th of the season), Ettingshausen brought up his 100th try for the Cronulla club. He would finish the season with 112 tries for Cronulla. At the end of the 1994 season, he was selected for his second Kangaroo tour. In almost a carbon copy of his 1990 Tour, Ettingshausen was the team's top try scorer with 15 from 11 games played which included all three tests playing on the wing against Great Britain and the single test against France. Ettingshausen remains the only player to be the leading try scorer on consecutive Kangaroo tours.

Ettingshausen captained Cronulla-Sutherland to the 1997 Super League Grand Final, but they lost 26-8 to the Brisbane Broncos in front of 58,912 fans at the ANZ Stadium in Brisbane (the Broncos home ground) in what was the first night Grand Final played in Australia and the first not to be played in Sydney. He then toured with the Australian SL team to Great Britain and France at the end of 1997, playing all four tests (three against Great Britain, and one against France) in the centres. Other than the 1992 Ashes series, this was the only time ET failed to score a try for Australia in a full test series.

In the 1999 NRL season, Ettingshausen played 26 games for Cronulla as the club won the minor premiership after enjoying one of their best ever seasons. Ettingshausen played in the club's preliminary final defeat against St George at Stadium Australia.

Ettingshausen played on for Cronulla in the 2000 NRL season which would be his last. His final game as a player came in round 23 2000 against the Auckland Warriors which Cronulla won 22-12 at Shark Park.

He ended up playing a total of 328 first grade games, all for Cronulla which at the time became the record for the most games for a single club, and 6th highest overall. His record was broken when Darren Lockyer played his 329th game for the Brisbane Broncos in Round 25 of the 2009 NRL season. As of the 2013 NRL season, ET sits 6th on the NSWRL/ARL/SL/NRL all-time games list behind Lockyer (355), Terry Lamb (349), Steve Menzies (349), Brad Fittler (336) and Cliff Lyons (332).

=== Controversy ===
During the 1991 NSWRL season Ettingshausen filed a defamation lawsuit against the Australian HQ magazine and photographer Brett Cochrane. Cochrane had taken a photo of Ettingshausen while he was in the shower on the 1990 Kangaroo tour of Great Britain. The magazine ran the shot in 1991 without his permission. Ettingshausen successfully sued the magazine for originally $350,000 which was later reduced to $100,000 after appeal.

In 2012, Ettingshausen admitted to having a 12-month affair with the wife of close friend Paul Mellor. He also revealed he had been suffering from depression.

== Representative career ==
=== City Origin ===
Ettingshausen first played in the annual City vs Country Origin game in 1988. He would go on to make eight appearances for the team until his final selection in 1996. He scored 4 tries in the 8 games, and in a pointer to higher representative honors, his first game was on the wing.

=== New South Wales ===
Ettingshausen made his New South Wales début in the 1987 State of Origin series, and over the next nine years went on to bring his tally of State of Origin games to twenty-seven. He made his début on the wing but went on to cover both the positions of fullback and centre, scoring a total of seven Origin tries, plus another three in his three games for NSW during the 1997 Super League Tri-series where he played all games, including the series Final against Queensland at the ANZ Stadium in Brisbane, in the centres. The game was drawn 18-18 at the end of regular time (80 minutes) and 22-22 after a further 20 minutes of extra time, and only ended only after NSW halfback Noel Goldthorpe kicked a field goal in the 104th minute. This made it the longest-ever game of first class rugby league.

=== Australia ===
Ettingshausen played in 29 Test matches for Australia (including 4 with the Super League Australian team) between 1988 and 1997. He made his test début in the green and gold on 11 June 1988 against the touring Great Britain Lions, playing on the wing at the Sydney Football Stadium. In the 100th test between the two teams, Australia defeated the tourists 17-6 He would score his first test try in the second game of the series at Lang Park as the Aussies retained The Ashes with a 34-14 victory.

Ettingshausen was selected to both the 1990 and 1994 Kangaroo Tours, playing in all 9 tests played over the two tours, and holds the distinction of being the only ever Kangaroo Tourist to be the leading try scorer on consecutive tours, crossing for 15 tries on each tour. He was also selected to the 1991 tour of Papua New Guinea.

Ettingshausen's 29th and final test for Australia came during the 1997 Super League Test series at the Elland Road stadium in Leeds, England where Australia defeated Great Britain 37-20.

Despite being one of the first choice backs selected for representative sides during his career, Ettingshausen never played in a Rugby League World Cup final for the Kangaroos. He missed selection when Australia defeated New Zealand 25-12 in 1988 at Eden Park, was unavailable through injury when Australia defeated Great Britain 10-6 in 1992 at Wembley, and wasn't selected for the 1995 Rugby League World Cup which was played at the height of the Super League war, and the Australian Rugby League controversially did not select any Super League aligned players (though Australia would still go on to win the Final at Wembley 16-8 over hosts England).

In total, Ettingshausen played 29 tests for Australia (5 at fullback, 14 on the wing, 10 in the centres and 4 off the bench), plus another 15 tour matches. He scored 14 test tries and 25 in the tour games.

== Career playing statistics ==
Ettingshausen's 165 tries is the fifth highest tally in Australian first grade rugby league, behind Ken Irvine (212), Steven Menzies (180), Alex Johnston (210) and Billy Slater (190). His tally is also the third highest total for any player who played their entire career at a single club.

Andrew Ettingshausen is one of ten players to have scored more than 150 tries in his NSWRL/ARL/SL/NRL career.

=== Point scoring summary ===
Games	Tries	Goals	F/G	Points
328	166	1	–	662

=== Matches played ===
Team	Matches	Tries	Years
Cronulla-Sutherland Sharks	328	165	1983–2000
Australian PM's XIII	1	–	1985
Leeds Rhinos	40	30	1986–1989
NSW City Firsts	1	2	1987
New South Wales*	30	10	1987–1998
NSW City Origin	8	4	1988–1996
Australia (tests)*	29	14	1988–1997
Australia (non-test international)	1	1	1988
Australia (non-international tour games)	16	22	1990–1994
TOTAL	454	248	1983–2000

* New South Wales and Australia (tests) stats include games played under the Super League banner in 1997.

== Post playing ==
After the 2005 Cronulla riots, Ettingshausen was selected along with fellow sports stars Susie Maroney, Nick Davis, Mark Ella, and former Sharks teammate Jason Stevens to head the $250,000 NSW government campaign to promote Sydney's beach suburbs as safe for everyone.

In February 2008, Ettingshausen was named in the list of Australia's 100 Greatest Players (1908–2007) which was commissioned by the NRL and ARL to celebrate the code's centenary year in Australia.

In 1992, the Cronulla club extended their ground at Endeavour Field, adding a new stand to the ground at a cost of 2.5 million dollars. The club originally calling the stand the 'Western Endeavour' grandstand but with the retirement of Andrew Ettingshausen in 2000 the club decided to name it the 'Andrew Ettingshausen' stand in his honour.

2003 saw the Cronulla-Sutherland Sharks name the top ten Sharks legends of all-time as nominated by fans and picked by a panel of experts. Ettingshausen was named amongst the ten and was then further honoured by being picked as one of the three first immortals of the club along with Gavin Miller and Steve Rogers

=== Television career ===
With his retirement from rugby league, Ettingshausen launched his media career with his own television show on the Nine Network in 1997 titled, Escape with ET. The show is essentially a fishing show hosted by Ettingshausen though it also focuses on many water sports (such as white water rafting and wakeboarding), off-road 4WD driving and other outdoors activities.

The show has been currently running for eight years to date and in 2005 moved to rival network Network Ten. It usually had a celebrity appearing on each episode including former professional rugby league footballers such as David Peachey and Ryan Girdler along with others including Paul Kelly, John Barnes and Layne Beachley.

In 2014, Ettingshausen won an Asian Television Award for best sports presenter.

In 2015, Ettingshausen hosted the four part Discovery Channel series Saltwater Heroes.

In 2019, Ettingshausen competed in the sixth season of Australian Survivor. He was eliminated on Day 14 and finished in 19th place.
