= Adam Dykes =

Australian rugby league footballer

Personal information
- Born: 5 February 1977 (age 49) Sydney, New South Wales, Australia
- Height: 176 cm (5 ft 9 in)
- Weight: 86 kg (13 st 8 lb)

Playing information
- Position: Five-eighth, Halfback
Club
Years	Team	Pld	T	G	FG	P
1995–01	Cronulla Sharks	129	36	1	3	149
2002–04	Parramatta Eels	38	11	5	2	56
2005–07	Cronulla Sharks	54	11	0	0	44
2008	Hull FC	16	4	0	2	18
	Total	237	62	6	7	267
Representative
Years	Team	Pld	T	G	FG	P
2001	NSW City	1	0	0	0	0
- Source: As of 11 August 2008
- Relatives: Kade Dykes (son)

Adam Dykes (born 5 February 1977) is an Australian former professional rugby league footballer who played in the 1990s and 2000s. He played in the National Rugby League for Sydney clubs, the Cronulla-Sutherland Sharks and the Parramatta Eels, and in the Super League for English club Hull FC. Dykes' usual position was five-eighth, though he has also been shuffled around the backs during his career, playing minor parts of it at both lock and in the halfback role. He is the father of Kade Dykes.

== Background ==
Dykes was born in Sydney, New South Wales, Australia. His son Kade currently plays for the Cronulla-Sutherland Sharks.

== Playing career ==
=== Early career ===
Dykes began playing rugby league at an early age after being heavily involved and influenced into the game by his father John Dykes who was a professional player himself for one season in 1976 for Cronulla, along with also being their reserve grade coach between 1993 and 1994.

With Dykes possessing copious amounts of talent at a young age rising into grade as a 16-year-old. Dykes was selected in the Australian under 15's and 17's squads and was seen as one of the Sharks most talented juniors ever to rise through the ranks.

=== 1995 ===
Dykes made his first grade début for the Cronulla-Sutherland Sharks as an 18-year-old in the 1995 season (11 March, round 1) against Newcastle. With several impressive performances for the club he quickly cemented his position in John Lang's outfit as a key impact player off the interchange bench.

=== 1996-01 ===
After spending the 1996 ARL season as a utility player off the bench, Dykes was given the chance to prove himself as a regular starter in the halves. At the end of 1996, Dykes played 24 games for the club as Cronulla reached the preliminary final against rivals Manly-Warringah but were defeated 24–0 at the Sydney Football Stadium.

In 1997, Dykes played a prominent role in Cronulla's season, ending in the club's Super League grand final loss to the Brisbane Broncos. In 2001, he rose to represent City in the annual City vs Country Origin match, was selected for the Australian train on squad, crowned the Daily M five eighth of the year and named in the NRL team of the year.

=== 2002-04 ===
Dykes was controversially signed by Parramatta Eels head coach Brian Smith for the start of the 2002 NRL season on a four-year deal, angering many Cronulla fans as they had seen him as one of the central members of the team along with the fact that he was a born and bred Cronulla junior. With this in mind many fans began speculating that Dykes had clashed with new Cronulla coach Chris Anderson and that this had led to his departure, though none of these claims were ever proven to be factual.

After three injury plagued years at Parramatta, Dykes approached the club asking them for a termination on his final year with the club, citing wanting to return home to Cronulla.

=== 2005-07 ===
Dykes returned to the Cronulla-Sutherland Sharks in 2005 under the influence of coach Stuart Raper. Dykes played 22 games for Cronulla in his return year for the club as they qualified for the finals but were eliminated in the first week by rivals St. George. Dykes spent two further years at Cronulla as the club failed to qualify for the finals on both occasions.

=== 2008 ===
Dykes had a disappointing year in England featuring only 17 times for Hull FC missing the Challenge Cup final in a season wrecked by injury. Dykes was instrumental for the black and whites when he was on the pitch winning every man of the match award in the Challenge Cup run to the final.
