= Mat Rogers =

Australian rugby league and rugby union footballer (born 1976)

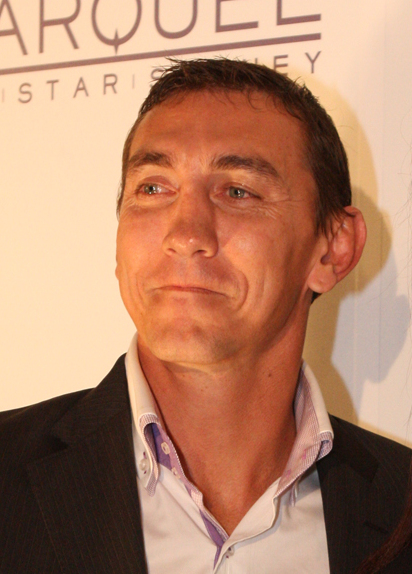

Personal information
- Full name: Mathew Steve Rogers
- Born: 1 February 1976 (age 50) Sydney, New South Wales, Australia

Playing information
- Height: 182 cm (6 ft 0 in)
- Weight: 87 kg (13 st 10 lb)

Rugby league
- Position: Five-eighth, Fullback, Centre, Wing
Club
Years	Team	Pld	T	G	FG	P
1995–01	Cronulla Sharks	123	75	406	0	1112
2007–11	Gold Coast Titans	77	31	59	1	243
	Total	200	106	465	1	1355
Representative
Years	Team	Pld	T	G	FG	P
1997	Queensland (SL)	3	1	6	0	16
1999–00	Queensland	5	3	12	1	37
1998–00	Australia	11	9	66	0	168

Rugby union
- Position: Fullback, Centre, Wing, Fly-half
Club
Years	Team	Pld	T	G	FG	P
2002–06	NSW Waratahs	32	17	49	0	202
Representative
Years	Team	Pld	T	G	FG	P
2002–06	Australia	45	14	46	0	163
- Father: Steve Rogers

Mathew Steve Rogers (born 1 February 1976) is an Australian former professional rugby league and rugby union footballer who played in the 1990s, 2000s and 2010s. He played both codes at the highest level, becoming a dual-code international. He is currently a rugby union commentator on Stan Sport.

The son of the late Cronulla-Sutherland Sharks legend and chief executive officer Steve Rogers, Mat played for the Sharks as well. He played in two State of Origin series for Queensland (1999 and 2000), and 7 Tests for the Australian national side (1998 to 2000) before his switch to union in 2001. Rogers played at fly half in his final season for the Waratahs and started in a number of games for the Wallabies in various positions in the backline. He returned to rugby league in 2007 with the newly formed Gold Coast Titans club and retired in 2010. With the Titans beset by injuries and poor form, Rogers announced his comeback to help out the club on-field in 2011, but a serious injury forced him to announce his retirement again just minutes into his first game back.

Rogers is also well known for another career path on the Network Ten revival of Australian Survivor, competing in both the third and fifth seasons. Despite not winning either season, he is a massive fan favourite amongst the Survivor fanbase, being dubbed "The Godfather" for his strategic gameplay.

== Background ==
Rogers was born in Caringbah, New South Wales, Australia. He began playing junior rugby league for the Engadine Dragons.

His father, Steve, retired from professional rugby league in 1986 and the family settled on the Gold Coast, Queensland when Mat was 9 years of age. He played his junior rugby league for the Nerang Roosters and attended The Southport School (TSS) during his high schooling years, playing both forms of the game. Rogers excelled in rugby at TSS, a well known rugby union nursery. He played in the Australian Schoolboys rugby union representative team in 1993, at one point playing opposite a young Jonny Wilkinson, and future All Blacks player Jonah Lomu.

== Rugby league career ==
Whilst preferring rugby union after playing it at schoolboy level, the sport had yet to go professional in 1994 when he had left school. He therefore decided to pursue a career in rugby league, joining his father's former club, the Cronulla-Sutherland Sharks. Rogers formed powerful combinations with centre partner Andrew Ettingshausen and later fullback David Peachey. He was an entertaining ball-running winger during the mid-to-late 90s. He Rogers was chosen for the Australian team to compete in the end of season 1999 Tri Nations tournament. In the final against New Zealand he played on the wing, scoring two tries and kicking three goals in the Kangaroos' 22-20 victory.

Rogers expressed his desire to shift from his position on the wing to either Centre or Fullback. However, a serious injury to his shoulder rotator cuff at the conclusion of the Kangaroos’ successful 2000 Rugby League World Cup Campaign destroyed his chance. Despite this he was the tournament's top point-scorer. After a complete shoulder reconstruction he was restricted to a handful of games during the 2001 season, his final year with the Sharks.

== Rugby union career ==
Following his switch Rogers was an immediate success in rugby union. He made his Wallaby debut with Wendell Sailor in a Test match against France in June 2002. Collectively at that point they became the 41st and 42nd Australian dual code internationals.

His transition had not been without controversy. Several times Rogers found himself the focus of media scrutiny after making comments regarding the state of Australian club rugby in comparison to training for the Wallabies and after an alleged altercation outside an Edinburgh nightclub with a fan in 2004.

His initial switch was less than smooth after coach Bob Dwyer revealed that Waratahs and Wallaby stalwart Matthew Burke would be moved from his preferred position of fullback to outside centre in order to accommodate Rogers. His 2004 Super 12 season started brilliantly but a serious ankle injury suffered in South Africa ruled him out of that year's Tri Nations series.

An autobiography Off the Wing, On a Prayer was published in 2002 and written while his father Steve Rogers was still alive and when he was married to Michelle Miller, the mother of his children – Jack and Skyla.

Starting in the 2005 Tri Nations Series, Rogers was shifted from fullback to play at fly-half following the injury of Stephen Larkham. He continued to play in that position during the 2005 spring tour of Europe and remained there for the Waratahs for most of the new Super 14 competition in 2006.

Coming on late in the second half in the second test against South Africa in the 2006 Tri Nations Series, Rogers scored a late try which allowed Stirling Mortlock to kick the winning conversion from the left sideline, for a 20–18 win.

It was reported on 28 August 2006 that Rogers had sustained a knee injury requiring arthroscopic surgery and was ruled out of the last test against The Springboks but was fit for the end of year tour. "I've had (the injury) for a couple of weeks and I was hoping it would have pulled up a bit better than it has," Rogers said. "I'm disappointed to miss out on the Springboks match because I feel that we've got a great chance of winning a Test on their soil, which hasn't been done for a long time."

The Daily Telegraph in 2006 sparked the question of how many games Rogers has actually not participated in due to injuries and quoted the following figures: Rogers has missed 21 out of 61 games for the Waratahs, some due to his father's death at the start of the year. For the Wallabies he has played 41 of 57 matches. Overall, he has not played for 37 of 118 games making him a spectator 31% of the time since moving to rugby union.

Rogers was named in the 37-man squad for Australia's tour of Europe. He had been selected to play at fly-half with usual number 10 Larkham playing outside him at inside-centre.

On 14 December 2006, Mat Rogers was released from his contract from the Waratahs and the Australian Rugby Union.

== Return to rugby league ==
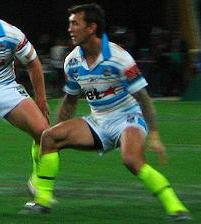
Rogers playing for the Gold Coast Titans

In 2007, Rogers revived his rugby league career with the new club, Gold Coast Titans in the National Rugby League. He became their equal top tryscorer for the Titans’ inaugural season even after missing a handful of games late in the season due to a cracked patella.

Rogers started the 2008 season with the Gold Coast Titans at five-eighth. Rogers had been suspended for the first time in his National Rugby League career after a dangerous tackle on Parramatta Eels winger, Luke Burt, during Round 5 of the league Premiership.

Roger announced his retirement from professional sport on 16 August 2010, and played his last National Rugby League game on 24 September, with the Titans losing the preliminary final to the Sydney Roosters. There was speculation that he would continue to play in 2011, with Rogers hinting that he would register with the National Rugby League in case of an injury crisis, but that did not eventuate

With the Titans playing poorly in 2011, Rogers had agreed to train with the club and was intent on returning to the field. He returned in Round 18 against the New Zealand Warriors, with this match marking his 200th NRL appearance. However, Rogers broke his foot in the 22-6 loss, effectively ending both his season and his career for a second time.

== Records and accolades ==
In 2000, Rogers was awarded the Australian Sports Medal for his contribution to Australia's international standing in the sport of rugby league.

He holds the standing record for the most points scored in an Australia-New Zealand rugby league Test match with 24 (2 tries and 8 goals) scored in the Anzac Test of 2000 in Sydney.

In his five seasons with Waratahs, he became the third highest points scorer with 202 points. He equalled Matthew Burke's record for the most individual conversions in a match with six, achieved in the Waratahs 2004 round two clash against the Sharks at Sydney Football Stadium on 28 February 2004.

In the 2003 Rugby World Cup, he set the Australian record the most points in match. It came in Australia's 142–0 victory over Namibia where he scored two tries and 16 conversions for 42 points.

Whilst playing Rugby League with Cronulla-Sutherland Sharks, Mat had set many records, including:- Most career points (all grades) - 1321 points (1994 - 2001) Most points in a season - 212 points (including 18 tries and 70 conversion goals - 2000) Most points in a match - 26 points (3 tries, 7 conversion goals) versus Newcastle - 2000) The records in the season of 2000 were set when Mat only played 23 of 27 games. Of those 23 games, Mat scored points in every game except Brisbane in Round 17.

== Personal life ==
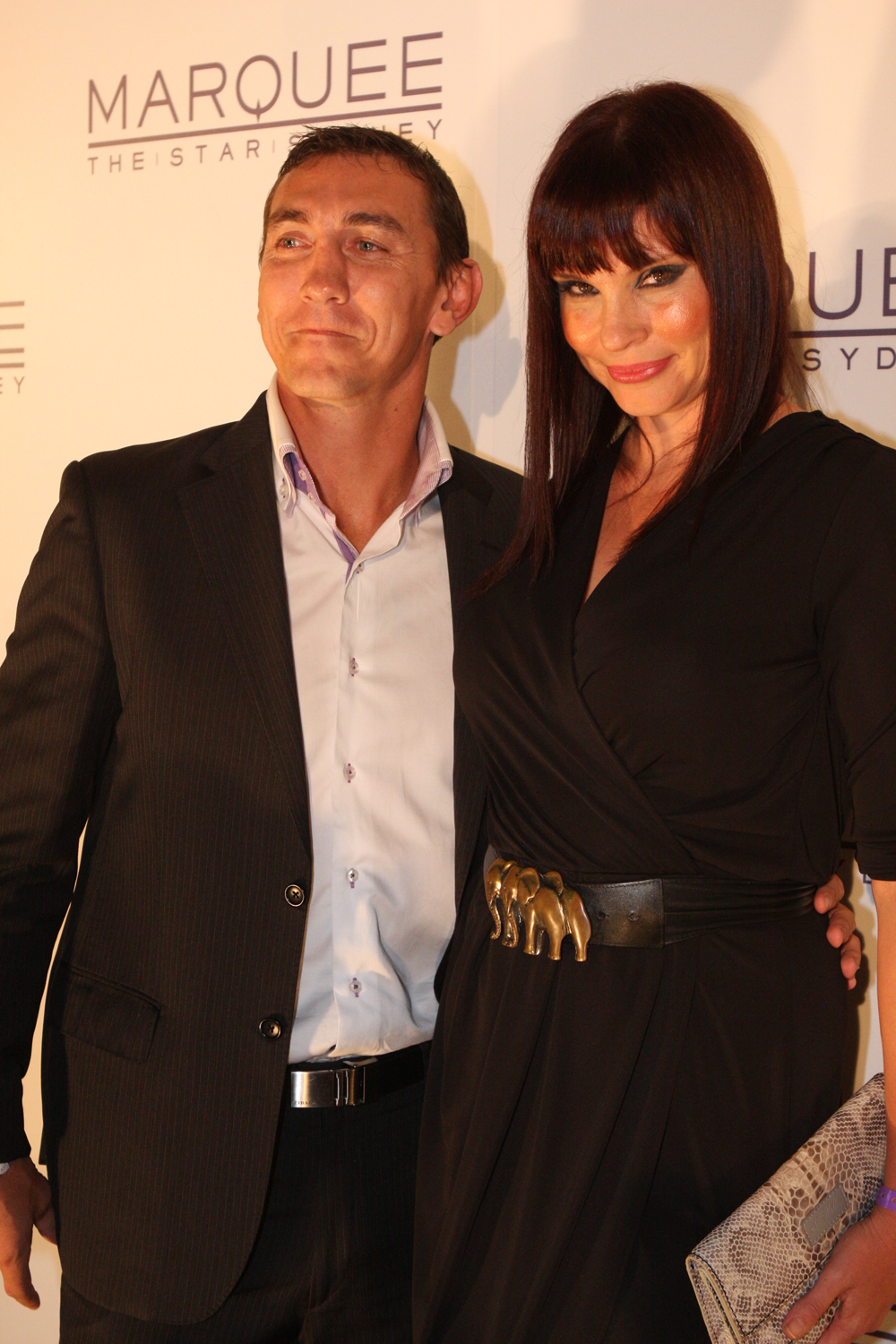
Mat Rogers with wife Chloe Maxwell, 2012

Rogers married model and media personality Chloe Maxwell on the Gold Coast on 26 October 2008. Rogers has four children: Jack and Skyla from a previous relationship, Max Danger (born 5 June 2006) and daughter Phoenix (born 21 September 2007) with current wife Chloe.

Rogers has been committed to raising awareness about depression since the death of his father Steve in January 2006. His father battled depression for three years and, while suicide was initially suspected, his death after taking alcohol and prescription drugs was ruled an accident.

He has signed on to be an ambassador for Movember, an initiative that encourages men to grow a moustache during November to raise funds for research into depression and prostate cancer. Rogers has said he fears inheriting a propensity for the mental illness. He has made a pact with brother Don always to be honest about their feelings and encouraged men to talk to family, doctors or mates.

He was a semifinalist in the fifteenth season of Dancing with the Stars.

Rogers worked for the Gold Coast commonwealth Games held in 2018.

=== Australian Survivor ===
In 2018, Rogers appeared as a contestant on Australian Survivor: Champions vs. Contenders, competing in the fifth season of the competitive reality television series Australian Survivor as part of the Champions tribe. During the early portions of the game, Rogers used his physical strength to help his tribe win challenges and was avoided being targeted. Before a crucial tribe swap, Rogers had a core alliance with fellow Champion tribemates Shane Gould, Lydia Lassila, Steve Willis, Moana Hope, Samuel "Sam" Hinton, and Sharn Coombes. Rogers was able to make it to merge only losing one alliance member, Hope, but soon assisted in voting out Lassila and Hinton. On Day 37, Rogers had a plan to vote out fellow contestant Brian Lake, but was ultimately blindsided and voted out by tribemates Monika Radulovic and Benji Wilson. Rogers finished in 9th place and became the third member of the jury. During the Final Tribal Council between Gould and Coombes, Coombes's tacit betrayal of Rogers was highlighted and Rogers cast his vote for Gould, which wound up winning her the game.

In 2020, Rogers returned to compete on Australian Survivor: All Stars. He gained praise after forming an underground alliance with David Genat, after being on the bottom of the Vakama tribe. At the tribe swap, he was swapped onto a tribe with none of his former alliance members. Rogers was voted out on Day 22, after playing 2 idols throughout the season. He was the 10th person voted out.

== See also ==
- List of players who have converted from one football code to another
