= Super League (Australia) =

Australian rugby league competition active in 1997

- Sport: Rugby league
- Instituted: 1997
- Inaugural season: 1997
- Ceased: 1997
- Replaced by: National Rugby League
- Chief Executive: John Ribot
- Number of teams: 10
- Countries: Australia; New Zealand
- Premiers: Brisbane Broncos (1997)

Super League was an Australian rugby league football administrative body that conducted professional competition in Australia and New Zealand for one season in 1997. Along with Super League of Europe, it was created by News Corporation during the Super League war which arose following an unsuccessful attempt to purchase the pay television rights to rugby league in Australia. After two years of legal battles the competition was played for a single season in 1997 alongside the rival Australian Rugby League (ARL) competition before the two merged in 1998 to form the National Rugby League (NRL).

== History ==
The Super League war was the corporate dispute that was fought in and out of court during the mid-1990s between the Rupert Murdoch and News Corporation-backed Super League and the Kerry Packer and Optus Vision-backed Australian Rugby League organisations over broadcasting rights for, and ultimately control of the top-level professional rugby league football competition of Australasia. After much court action from the already-existing ARL to prevent it from happening, Super League ran one premiership season parallel to the ARL's in 1997 after signing enough clubs disenchanted with the traditional administration to do so. At the conclusion of that season a peace deal was reached and both Leagues united to form the National Rugby League of today.

== Teams ==
Ten clubs competed in domestic competition; eight which had previously competed in the Australian Rugby League, and two new teams. The teams were:

Adelaide Rams	Auckland Warriors	Brisbane Broncos	Canberra Raiders	Canterbury Bulldogs

Cronulla Sharks	Hunter Mariners	North Queensland Cowboys	Penrith Panthers	Perth Reds

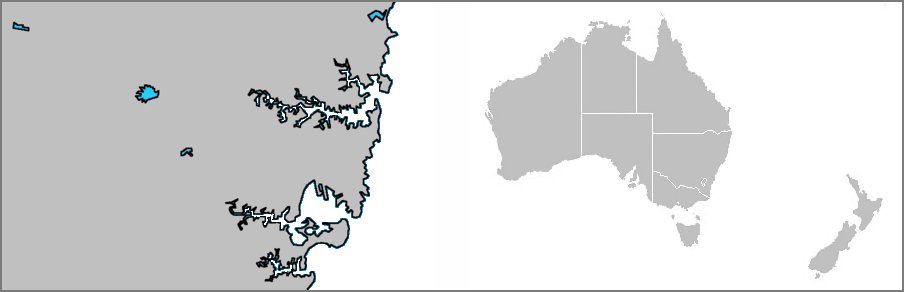
Locations of the participating clubs: in the Sydney area (left), Australia and New Zealand (right)

=== Referees ===
Super League was successful in recruiting some of the best referees from the ARL. These included Bill Harrigan, Graham Annesley, Tim Mander, Steve Clark and Brian Grant.

== Super League competitions ==
=== Telstra Cup ===
The Telstra Cup was a ten team competition held over 18 rounds. The season was dominated by the minor premiers, the Brisbane Broncos, who won 14 of their 18 matches, losing only to the Penrith Panthers, the Hunter Mariners and eventual runners-up, the Cronulla Sharks. The Grand Final was played at Brisbane's ANZ Stadium in front of 58,912 people, the ground record for that venue. Brisbane defeated Cronulla 26–8 to win their third premiership. Auckland had teams in both the Reserve grade and two age-group Grand Finals but lost all three.

The winners in all grades were:

1st/Seniors Grade: Brisbane defeated Cronulla
2nd/Reserve Grade: Canterbury defeated Auckland
3rd/Under-19s Grade: Penrith defeated Auckland
4th/Under-17s Grade: Brisbane defeated Auckland

=== Tri-series ===
The Super League Tri-series was contested by New South Wales, New Zealand and Queensland. Each team played the others once, with the best two teams playing a final. New South Wales defeated Queensland 23–22 in the final at ANZ Stadium

=== International matches ===
In 1997 the Super League Australia team played two games against New Zealand, winning the inaugural ANZAC Test and losing the return match. At the end of the season Australia also played a three-Test series against Great Britain in the British Gas Test series. Australia won the series by two games to one. Although these matches are considered to be Tests by the New Zealand Rugby League and the English Rugby Football League, they are not recognised by the Australian Rugby League.

As News had signed up most rugby league organisations outside of Australia, the ARL was starved of international competition. They had intended playing a team of New Zealand players signed with ARL clubs but the New Zealand Rugby League took out an injunction in the Federal Court preventing the ARL from using the terms "Test", "Representative Team", "New Zealand" or "All Golds". The ARL instead played Tests against rebel teams from Papua New Guinea and Fiji, as well as playing a Test against a Rest of the World team in July 1997.

The Oceania Cup was run by Super League in place of the Pacific Cup. It was contested by the Cook Islands, Fiji, Tonga, New Zealand Māori, New Zealand XIII and Papua New Guinea. New Zealand XIII defeated New Zealand Maori 20–15 in the final.

=== World Club Challenge ===
The World Club Challenge, which had been contested occasionally since 1975, was expanded in 1997 to include all ten Australian Super League clubs competing against all twelve European clubs. The European teams were outclassed, winning only 8 of 83 matches, and suffering many heavy defeats. The competition was unpopular in Australia, and it lost $6,000,000 due to small crowds and heavy travel expenses. The Brisbane Broncos won the final defeating the Hunter Mariners 36–12 at Ericsson Stadium, Auckland.

=== Super League Challenge Cup ===
The Super League Challenge Cup competition was played between the Australian Capital Territory, Northern Territory, South Australia and Western Australia. The Australian Capital Territory won the competition, defeating the Northern Territory 40–14 at ANZ Stadium Brisbane on 19 May 1997.

=== World Nines ===
In 1996 and 1997 the Super League World Nines competition was held. In 1997 the tournament was known as the Gatorade Super League World Nines due to sponsorship. Nines rugby league is a faster form of the game with only nine players per side and playing in shorter halves. The World Nines competition were held as an alternative to the ARL's World Sevens.

The 1996 World Nines were held in Suva, Fiji from 22 to 24 February. The winner of this competition was New Zealand. The 1996 World Nines marked the first time that a video referee was used for a game of rugby league. The 1997 World Nines were held in Townsville, Queensland from 31 January to 2 February. New Zealand won this competition for the second year in a row.

== Legacy ==
Although Super League damaged the public perceptions and financial standing of rugby league in Australia, a number of concepts that it introduced lived on into the new millennium.

=== ANZAC Test ===
An addition to the regular tests played between Australia and New Zealand, the ANZAC Test was introduced by Super League. There was some controversy at the time for the use of the word ANZAC, as many considered it inappropriate to compare sportspeople to soldiers. Although it was dropped from the annual schedule in the early years of the new millennium, it was revived in 2004 and was played annually until 2017.

=== Night grand finals ===
The Super League Telstra Cup Grand Final was played on a Saturday night in Brisbane, whereas all NSWRL and ARL grand finals were traditionally played on a Saturday afternoon (until 1980), or Sunday afternoon (from 1981). From 2001 the NRL has played its grand finals on the Sunday night in October (although in the afternoon/early evening between 2008 and 2012 because of television scheduling), to coincide with a public holiday in New South Wales the following day.

Although a ratings success for the Nine Network, this scheduling continues to upset traditionalists, who believe that having the Grand Final on a Sunday afternoon allows people to better celebrate the day, particularly with a Grand Final barbecue. Some in Sydney also believe that holding the grand final at night dissuades parents with young children attending.

=== Video referees ===
At the Super League World Nines in 1996 the video referee was used for the first time. The Video referee allows an official to check the veracity of tries scored using footage from the television broadcasters. The NRL used Video Referees from its first season in 1998.

=== Rule changes ===
A number of rule changes were introduced in both the Super League and the ARL during the war that have been adopted by the NRL. Super League innovations include:

- Zero tackle rule (in a modified form).
- Scrums packed 20 metres in from touch.

An ARL rule change for the 1997 season that was adopted by the NRL and is still in force is the popular 40/20 rule. Under this rule, attacking teams kicking the ball into touch 'on the bounce' from inside the 40 metres closest to their goal line, with the ball crossing the sideline inside the opposing team's 20-metre area, receives a scrum feed. Previously the defending team received the scrum feed. The other major difference in Super League was that the scorer kicked off to the other team as opposed to the ARL and NRL rule where the scorer receives.

== See also ==
- Super League (Australia) season 1997
- Super League war
- Australian Rugby League
- National Rugby League
- Super League
