= David Peachey =

Australia international rugby league footballer

David William Peachey
Personal information
- Born: 21 April 1974 (age 52) Dubbo, New South Wales, Australia

Playing information
- Height: 190 cm (6 ft 3 in)
- Weight: 90 kg (14 st 2 lb)
- Position: Fullback
Club
| Years | Team | Pld | T | G | FG | P |
|---|---|---|---|---|---|---|
| 1994–05 | Cronulla Sharks | 232 | 110 | 0 | 0 | 440 |
| 2006 | Widnes Vikings | 9 | 10 | 0 | 0 | 40 |
| 2006–07 | South Sydney | 25 | 7 | 0 | 0 | 28 |
| | Total | 266 | 127 | 0 | 0 | 508 |
Representative
| Years | Team | Pld | T | G | FG | P |
| 2003 | NSW Country | 1 | 1 | 0 | 0 | 4 |
| 1997 | New South Wales (SL) | 3 | 1 | 0 | 0 | 4 |
| 2000 | New South Wales | 1 | 1 | 0 | 0 | 4 |
| 1997 | Australia (SL) | 1 | 0 | 0 | 0 | 0 |
- Relatives: Tyrone Peachey (nephew)

David Peachey (born 21 April 1974) is an Australian former professional rugby league footballer who played in the 1990s and 2000s. An Australian international and New South Wales representative fullback, he played the majority of his club football in the National Rugby League for the Cronulla-Sutherland Sharks. During his career, Peachey also played for the South Sydney Rabbitohs of the NRL and the Widnes Vikings in the National League One. Peachey also played representative rugby league for Country Origin. He is an Indigenous Australian. His nephew Tyrone Peachey debuted for the Cronulla Sharks but currently plays for the Penrith Panthers.

== Background ==
Peachey was born in Dubbo, New South Wales, Australia. Peachey began playing league rugby for his local junior club in Dubbo, the Dubbo Macquarie Raiders and South Dubbo High. After several seasons in the country with Dubbo he signed with the Cronulla Sharks.

== Playing career ==
=== Cronulla-Sutherland Sharks ===
Peachey's career with Cronulla-Sutherland began in the reserve squad but he quickly made his way into the first grade side after many dazzling performances in the lower grades. He made his first grade début on 12 March 1994 in Round 1 against the Canberra Raiders at Toyota Park.

Over the next few seasons Peachey quickly established himself as a first team regular in the Sharks' first grade side. His broken running and unexpected flashes of magic consistently dazzled not only home but also away crowds and he soon became a strong fan favourite within the league. Peachey played in Cronulla's 1996 preliminary final loss against Manly-Warringah at the Sydney Football Stadium in which Manly kept Cronulla scoreless winning 24–0. The following year, Peachey played in the 1997 Super League grand final for Cronulla against Brisbane which ended in a 26–8 loss.

In 1999, Peachey was presented with the Dally M award for Fullback of the Year. Cronulla finished the 1999 NRL season as minor premiers in one of the club's best ever seasons since entering the competition in 1967. Peachey played in Cronulla's preliminary final loss against St George at Stadium Australia. Peachey had scored a try in the first half to give Cronulla the lead until St George fought back in the second half to win 24–8. Peachey was selected at fullback for New South Wales in the 2000 State of Origin series. Unfortunately, a hamstring injury kept him out of the second and third games of the series, but not before he could cross for the match winning try in Game 1.

Peachey would go on to play in further preliminary final heartbreaks for Cronulla. In 2001, Peachey scored a try in the club's preliminary final loss against eventual premiers the Newcastle Knights. The following year in 2002, Peachey played in the club's preliminary final loss against the New Zealand Warriors.

In 2003, Peachey was named in the top ten Cronulla-Sutherland Sharks Legends, as nominated by the fans and picked by a panel of rugby league experts.

For several months in 2005 his future seemed uncertain until he announced on The NRL Footy Show that the club would no longer be retaining his services after twelve years of loyalty.

After his last match for Cronulla, a loss to Souths, played in wet conditions at night, Peachey left the formal farewell celebrations early to meet with his fans who were waiting in the rain outside the dressing rooms. These fans included Souths fans determined to show their respect. Peachey stayed signing autographs and agreed to have his photo taken until the very last fan of either club had left.

=== Widnes Vikings ===
After hearing the Cronulla board's decision not to retain his services after the 2005 season, Peachey began to negotiate with several clubs for the start of the 2006 season. Many speculated within the media where he would eventually end up; however it quickly became certain that he would move overseas to continue his career as he announced that he did not want play against his old club anytime in the future.

Peachey was then signed as a utility back by the Super League club, the Widnes Vikings. However, after their relegation from the Super League the club claimed it would not be able to afford his services. The club and fans, still desperate to acquire the services of the Australian, organised several fundraiser events which allowed Peachey to join the club for the beginning of the new season. However, in sweeping changes made by new club chairman Stephen Vaughan, Peachey had his contract terminated by the Widnes Vikings on Thursday 11 May 2006.

=== South Sydney Rabbitohs ===
In late May, 2006, the South Sydney Rabbitohs announced the signing of Peachey to a contract for the remainder of the 2006 season, later extended to 2007. In his second match for the club, he led the Rabbitohs, who were winless from the first thirteen rounds of the season, to a historic 34–14 victory over the second-placed Brisbane Broncos, who were missing players to Origin duties. It was the club's first win over the Broncos since 1989.

The first two rounds of the NRL season in 2007, saw a rejuvenated Peachey playing with vigour and a seemingly contagious attitude that rubs off on both his fellow players and the fans. His steadying influence and the ability to create something out of nothing, make "the Peach" a handful for any opposition. Despite having turned 33 before the season commenced, he has indicated that he is keen to have one more season with Souths. With the arrival of Craig Wing at Souths, it was announced on 5 July 2007 that Peachey would retire from the NRL at the end of the season, in order to fit Wing under the salary cap.

Peachey played his last game in the 2007 NSWRL Premier League grand final for the North Sydney Bears against Parramatta at Telstra Stadium which Norths lost 20–15 in the final seconds of the match courtesy of a Weller Hauraki try.

=== Representative Games ===
- Country: Represented Country Origin on one occasion in 2003
- State of Origin: Played 4 games in total for New South Wales (1997) &(2000)
- Australia: Played 1 game in total for his country, the Anzac Test Match (Super League) in 1997

== Later years ==
=== David Peachey Foundation ===
The David Peachey Foundation was founded to support indigenous kids from rural and remote areas that excel or show potential in rugby league.

The foundation provides small grants and support mechanisms for Indigenous children who participate in sport representing their state and or country. This support usually comes from financial aid to the children 25

=== Taupō event ===
Along with Frano Botica Peachey was heavily involved in the Cronulla Sharks playing NRL matches in Taupō. In the build up to the 2011 match he spent six months in Taupō, the birthplace of his wife. While he was there he played club rugby league for the Taupo Phoenix in the Bay of Plenty Rugby League competition and trialled for the King Country Rugby Football Union side.

== Awards and recognition ==
Peachey was awarded the Sportsperson of the Year Award at the 2003 NAIDOC Awards. In 2025, he was inducted into the Sharks Hall of Fame.
