= Mitch Healey =

Australian rugby league footballer

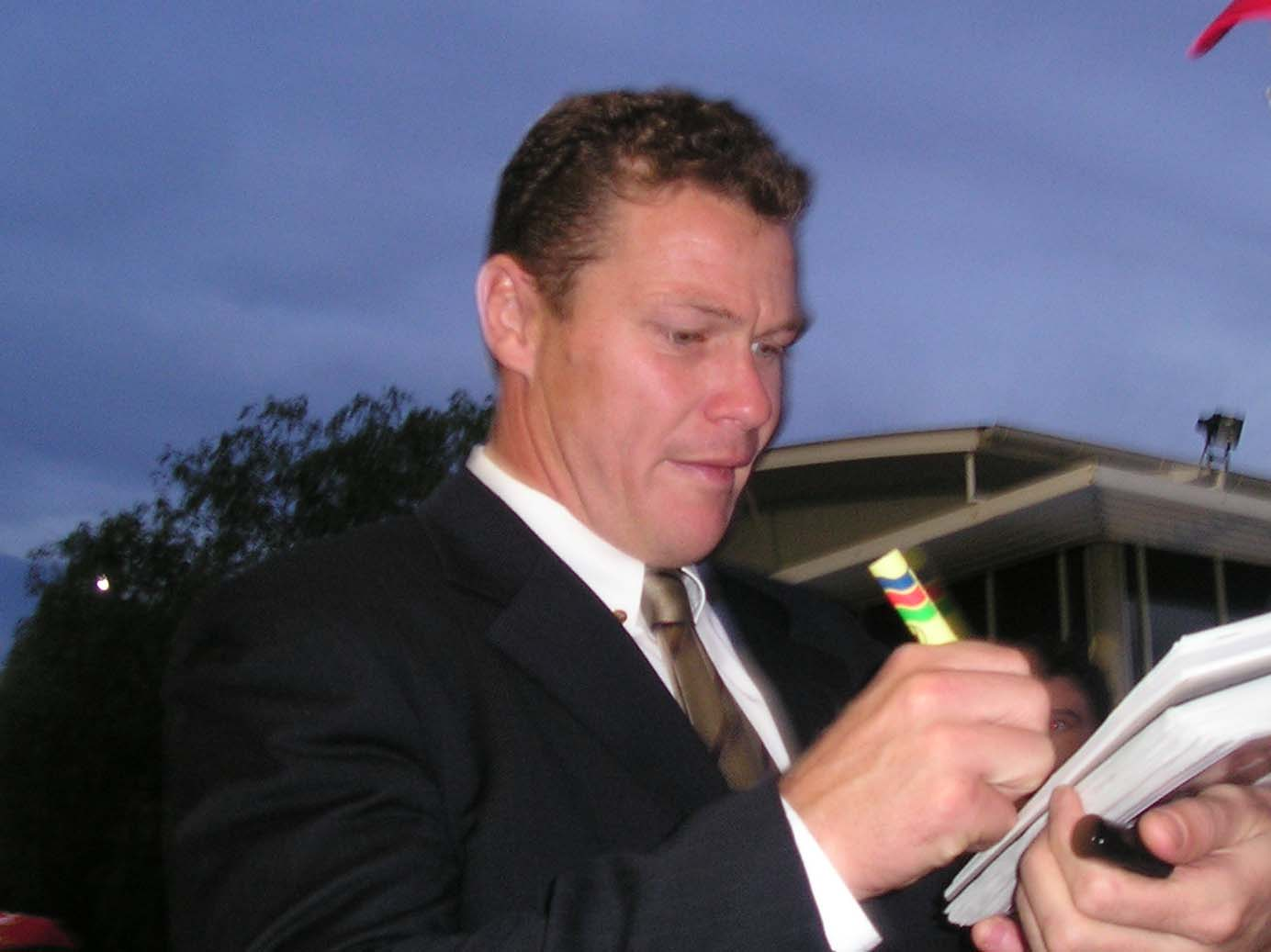
- Mitch Healey at the SFS

Personal information
- Full name: Mitch Healey
- Born: 11 May 1969 (age 57) Sydney, New South Wales, Australia

Playing information
- Height: 174 cm (5 ft 9 in)
- Weight: 79 kg (12 st 6 lb)
- Position: Five-eighth
Club
Years	Team	Pld	T	G	FG	P
1989–00	Cronulla-Sutherland	222	33	139	8	418
2001–03	Castleford	76	11	16	2	78
	Total	298	44	155	10	496
- Relatives: Samuel Healey (son)

Mitch Healey (born 11 May 1969) is an Australian former professional rugby league footballer, who played for the Cronulla-Sutherland Sharks.

== Debut ==
His first grade debut was on 23 July 1989 against the Canterbury-Bankstown Bulldogs at Endeavour Field. He started his début from the bench. Cronulla went on to win the match quite comfortably 25–10.

== Playing career ==
Healey played from 1989 to 2000 scoring a total of 33 tries in 222 games. Healey kicked a total of seven career field goals, including three against the North Sydney Bears. Healey kicked 139 goals during his time with Cronulla-Sutherland. Over his career, Healey scored a total of 418 points. In his last game of his career with the Cronulla-Sutherland Sharks, Healey scored a try against the Parramatta Eels. Healey then went on to play in the Super League with the Castleford Tigers. Whilst at the Castleford Tigers he partnered Danny Orr in the halves. Healey was injured for most of his 1st season in 2001 but in 2002 and 2003 he captured some form and proved to be a good player for the Castleford Tigers.

== Post playing ==
Healey who had previous coaching experience working as assistant to Souths NRL coaches Paul Langmack and Arthur Katinas in 2004, took over reins of the under-20 Cronulla side from Aaron Raper.
