= List of Cronulla-Sutherland Sharks players =

This article lists all rugby league footballers who have played first-grade for the Cronulla-Sutherland Sharks in the National Rugby League.

Notes:

- Debut:
  - Players are listed in the order of their debut game with the club.
  - Players that debuted in the same game are added in the order of their jersey number.
  - This excludes the inaugural lineup which is ordered alphabetically, with captain Monty Porter listed as player no. 1.
- Appearances: Cronulla-Sutherland Sharks games only, not a total of their career games. For example, Luke Lewis has played a career total of 324 first-grade games but of those, 116 were at Cronulla.
- Previous Club: refers to the previous first-grade rugby league club (NRL or Super League) the player played at and does not refer to any junior club, Rugby Union club or a rugby league club he was signed to but never played at.
- The statistics in this table are correct as of the end of the 2026 NRL season.

== List of players ==
Cap no.	Name	Nationality	Sharks career	Debut round	Previous club	Position	Appearances	Tries	Goals	Field goals	Points
1.	Monty Porter	(Australia)	1967	Rd. 1	St. George Dragons	Prop	22	3	0	0	9
2.	Eric Barnes	(Australia)	1967	Rd. 1	North Sydney Bears	Lock	22	1	0	0	3
3.	Dave Cooper	(Australia)	1967–72	Rd. 1	Balmain Tigers	Second-row	56	13	0	0	39
4.	Brian Cox	(Australia)	1967–70	Rd. 1	Parramatta Eels	Fullback	41	7	7	0	35
5.	Jack Danzey	(Australia)	1967–68	Rd. 1	Balmain Tigers	Five-eighth	25	3	0	2	13
6.	Denis Hewett	(Australia)	1967	Rd. 1	Debut	Wing	13	3	0	0	9
7.	Terry Hughes	(Australia)	1967–70	Rd. 1	Debut	Halfback	58	8	171	11	388
8.	John Hynes	(Australia)	1967–68	Rd. 1	South Sydney Rabbitohs	Hooker	43	1	0	0	3
9.	Garry MacDougall	(Australia)	1967–69	Rd. 1	St. George Dragons	Lock	32	0	0	0	0
10.	Alan McRitchie	(Australia)	1967–69	Rd. 1	St. George Dragons	Prop	47	1	0	0	3
11.	Greg Miller	(Australia)	1967–68	Rd. 1	Debut	Centre	12	1	0	0	3
12.	Warren Ryan	(Australia)	1967–68	Rd. 1	St. George Dragons	Centre	22	1	0	0	3
13.	Phil Silvester	(Australia)	1967	Rd. 1	Debut	Wing	5	0	0	0	0
14.	Ray Westwood	(Australia)	1967–68	Rd. 1	Balmain Tigers	Wing	41	5	0	0	15
15.	Ron Dutton	(Australia)	1967–68	Rd. 4	Debut	Five-eighth	37	5	0	0	15
16.	Warwick Randall	(Australia)	1967–68	Rd. 4	Debut	Prop	4	0	0	0	0
17.	Gordon Abercrombie	(Australia)	1967–70	Rd. 7	Debut	Fullback	52	5	21	9	75
18.	Ralph Harding	(Australia)	1967	Rd. 7	Canterbury-Bankstown Bulldogs	Prop	1	0	0	0	0
19.	Michael Wilson	(Australia)	1967–68	Rd. 8	Debut	Second-row	3	0	0	0	0
20.	Graeme Sams	(Australia)	1967–70, 1975–77	Rd. 9	Debut	Lock	85	7	0	0	21
21.	Bill Elliott	(Australia)	1967–68	Rd. 13	Debut	Wing	3	0	0	0	0
22.	Brian Kirk	(Australia)	1967	Rd. 17	Debut	Unknown	2	0	0	0	0
23.	Trevor Levin	(Australia)	1967–69	Rd. 17	St. George Dragons	Prop	15	0	0	0	0
24.	Frank Davis	(Australia)	1967	Rd. 19	Debut	Halfback	1	0	0	0	0
25.	Garrick Hale	(Australia)	1967	Rd. 20	Debut	Lock	1	0	0	0	0
26.	Ken Robinson	(Australia)	1967	Rd. 20	Debut	Unknown	0	0	0	0	0
27.	Rick Baber	(Australia)	1967	Rd. 22	Parramatta Eels	Lock, Second-row	1	0	0	0	0
28.	Ray Corcoran	(Australia)	1968–75	Rd. 1	Debut	Wing	108	63	0	0	189
29.	John Kay	(Australia)	1968	Rd. 1	Debut	Five-eighth	14	0	0	0	0
30.	Noel Thornton	(Australia)	1968–69	Rd. 1	Western Suburbs Magpies	Hooker	43	5	0	0	15
31.	Graham Wilson	(Australia)	1968–70	Rd. 1	Newtown Jets	Second-row	37	2	0	0	6
32.	Brian Foster	(Australia)	1968	Rd. 4	Debut	Wing	3	0	0	0	0
33.	John Monie	(Australia)	1968–70	Rd. 5	Debut	Five-eighth	48	10	0	1	32
34.	Paul Taylor	(Australia)	1968–76	Rd. 9	Debut	Centre	95	25	0	0	75
35.	Tony Newell	(Australia)	1968	Rd. 10	Debut	Wing	2	0	0	0	0
36.	John Maguire	(Australia)	1968–75	Rd. 14	St. George Dragons	Prop	137	20	0	0	60
37.	John Taper	(Australia)	1968–70	Rd. 21	Debut	Unknown	1	2	0	0	6
38.	George Fleming	(Australia)	1969–70	Rd. 1	Debut	Centre	13	3	0	0	9
39.	Len Gaffey	(Australia)	1969	Rd. 1	Debut	Wing, Centre	9	2	0	0	6
40.	Noel Gallagher	(Australia)	1969–70	Rd. 1	Debut	Hooker	25	5	0	0	15
41.	Geoff Parkes	(Australia)	1969	Rd. 1	Debut	Wing	6	1	0	0	3
42.	John Brown	(Australia)	1969	Rd. 2	Debut	Wing	3	0	8	0	16
43.	Dinny O'Bryan	(Australia)	1969	Rd. 2	North Sydney Bears	Halfback	3	0	1	0	2
44.	Mick Souter	(Australia)	1969, 1971	Rd. 2	Debut	Prop	26	1	0	0	3
45.	Chris Hyland	(Australia)	1969, 1975	Rd. 4	Debut	Wing	7	2	0	0	6
46.	Fred Tomlinson	(Australia)	1969, 1971	Rd. 4	Debut	Prop, Second-row	8	1	0	0	3
47.	Greg Pierce	(Australia)	1969–80	Rd. 5	Debut	Lock	210	35	0	0	105
48.	Chris Wellman	(Australia)	1969–74	Rd. 5	Debut	Five-eighth, Lock	81	17	2	0	20
49.	Peter Howard	(Australia)	1969–70	Rd. 9	Debut	Wing	27	5	0	0	15
50.	Kevin Hogan	(Australia)	1969–73	Rd. 14	Debut	Five-eighth	49	8	0	1	26
51.	Tommy Bishop	(England) (United Kingdom)	1969–71, 1973	Rd. 15	St Helens R.F.C.	Halfback	60	21	0	2	66
52.	George Taylforth	(Australia)	1970–72	Rd. 1	Canterbury-Bankstown Bulldogs	Prop	35	5	122	0	259
53.	Ron Turner	(Australia)	1970–75	Rd. 1	Debut	Hooker	92	12	0	0	36
54.	Rod Urquhart	(Australia)	1970–71	Rd. 1	Debut	Lock	28	5	0	0	15
55.	Bob Wear	(Australia)	1970–74	Rd. 1	Debut	Centre	103	29	0	0	87
56.	Denis Stapleton	(Australia)	1970	Rd. 4	Debut	Prop	14	1	0	0	3
57.	Paul Lennon	(Australia)	1970	Rd. 7	Debut	Fullback	3	0	0	0	0
58.	Greg Allen	(Australia)	1970–76	Rd. 11	Debut	Prop	81	2	0	0	6
59.	Michael Francisco	(Australia)	1970	Rd. 14	Debut	Unknown	0	0	0	0	0
60.	Alan Kennington	(Australia)	1970–72	Rd. 17	Debut	Second-row, Prop	28	1	0	0	3
61.	Ron Smith	(Australia)	1970–71	Rd. 20	Debut	Hooker	10	0	0	0	0
62.	Dave Cotter	(Australia)	1971–72	Rd. 1	Newtown Jets	Wing	34	11	30	0	93
63.	Fred Dennehy	(Australia)	1971–77	Rd. 1	Debut	Halfback	99	28	0	1	85
64.	Kevin Dixon	(New Zealand)	1971	Rd. 1	Debut	Second-row	4	1	0	0	3
65.	Barry Andrews	(Australia)	1971–79	Rd. 2	Debut	Five-eighth	112	17	303	0	657
66.	Les Bell	(Australia)	1971–72	Rd. 3	Newtown Jets	Fullback	16	2	0	0	6
67.	Peter O'Brien	(Australia)	1971, 1973	Rd. 7	Debut	Wing	11	6	0	0	18
68.	Maurie Raper	(Australia)	1971–74	Rd. 13	Penrith Panthers	Five-eighth	37	5	0	0	15
69.	Cliff Watson	(United Kingdom)	1971–73	Rd. 15	St Helens R.F.C.	Prop	38	9	0	0	27
70.	Gary Stewart	(Australia)	1971, 1973	Rd. 19	Debut	Second-row	31	0	0	0	0
71.	Daryl Townsend	(Australia)	1971	Rd. 21	Debut	Unknown	1	0	0	0	0
72.	Denis Beeby	(Australia)	1972	Rd. 1	Canterbury-Bankstown Bulldogs	Prop	3	0	0	0	0
73.	Tony Fletcher	(Australia)	1972, 1975	Rd. 1	Debut	Five-eighth	10	0	0	0	0
74.	Steve Hansard	(Australia)	1972, 1977–81	Rd. 1	Debut	Halfback	72	12	0	0	36
75.	Ken Maddison	(Australia)	1972–75	Rd. 1	St. George Dragons	Second-row	77	17	0	0	51
76.	Eric Archer	(Australia)	1972–79	Rd. 2	Debut	Second-row	108	21	21	0	105
77.	John Glassington	(Australia)	1972–73	Rd. 3	Debut	Centre	4	0	0	0	0
78.	Barry Reilly	(Australia)	1972	Rd. 3	Eastern Suburbs Roosters	Second-row	7	1	0	0	3
79.	Brian O'Shea	(Australia)	1972	Rd. 5	Debut	Second-row	5	0	0	0	0
80.	Steve Edmonds	(Australia)	1972–81	Rd. 14	Debut	Wing	116	45	13	0	161
81.	Steve Hyde	(Australia)	1972–73	Rd. 8	Debut	Hooker	5	0	0	0	0
82.	Grahame Bowen	(Australia)	1973–74	Rd. 1	St. George Dragons	Prop	29	5	0	0	15
83.	Olaf Prattl	(Australia)	1973	Rd. 1	Western Suburbs Magpies	Lock	3	0	0	0	0
84.	Warren Fisher	(Australia)	1973–78	Rd. 3	Debut	Fullback	68	26	1	0	80
85.	Steve Rogers	(Australia)	1973–82, 1985	Rd. 3	Debut	Centre	202	82	501	5	1253
86.	Rick Bourke	(Australia)	1973–82	Rd. 19	Debut	Wing	146	38	0	0	114
87.	Jim Harvey	(Australia)	1973	Rd. 19	Debut	Unknown	1	1	0	0	3
88.	Fred Pagano	(Australia)	1973, 1975–76	Rd. 19	Debut	Prop	20	0	0	0	0
89.	Greg Purcell	(Australia)	1974–75	Rd. 1	Canterbury-Bankstown Bulldogs	Hooker	18	0	0	0	0
90.	Dick Simpson	(Australia)	1974	Rd. 1	Debut	Lock	2	0	0	0	0
91.	David Waite	(Australia)	1974–76	Rd. 1	Debut	Wing	20	9	0	0	27
92.	Vince Farrar	(England) (United Kingdom)	1974	Rd. 2	Featherstone Rovers	Prop	18	1	0	0	3
93.	Peter Ryan	(Australia)	1974, 1976–78	Rd. 2	Debut	Prop	38	3	0	0	9
94.	Billy Benyon	(England) (United Kingdom)	1974	Rd. 7	St Helens R.F.C.	Centre	5	1	0	0	3
95.	Dave Chamberlin	(Australia)	1974–80	Rd. 10	Debut	Centre	85	45	0	0	135
96.	Don Hale	(Australia)	1974	Rd. 15	Debut	Second-row	1	0	0	0	0
97.	Paul Khan	(Australia)	1975–81	Rd. 1	Debut	Prop	120	14	0	0	42
98.	Greg Mullane	(Australia)	1975–76, 1979–83	Rd. 1	Debut	Centre	100	33	0	0	104
99.	Col Withers	(Australia)	1975	Rd. 1	Western Suburbs Magpies	Halfback	1	0	0	0	0
100.	Kevin Gibson	(Australia)	1975	Rd. 2	St. George Dragons	Prop	5	1	0	0	3
101.	John Dennehy	(Australia)	1975	Unknown	Debut	Unknown	0	0	0	0	0
102.	Rick Thackray	(Australia)	1975–76	Rd. 12	Debut	Second-row	5	0	0	0	0
103.	John Purcell	(Australia)	1975	Rd. 13	Debut	Halfback	9	5	0	0	15
104.	Harry Bryant	(Australia)	1975, 1977	Rd. 16	Debut	Prop	2	0	0	0	0
105.	John Glossop	(Australia)	1975–78, 1980, 1983	Rd. 17	Debut	Lock	23	4	0	0	12
106.	Martin Raftery	(Australia)	1975–79	Rd. 22	Debut	Five-eighth	52	22	0	0	66
107.	Steve Kneen	(Australia)	1976–82	Rd. 1	Debut	Second-row	87	5	0	0	15
108.	John McMartin	(Australia)	1976–79	Rd. 1	Parramatta Eels	Hooker	92	2	0	0	6
109.	Glenn Stolzenhein	(Australia)	1976	Rd. 1	Debut	Prop	8	3	0	0	9
110.	Roger Millward	(United Kingdom) (England)	1976	Rd. 6	Hull Kingston Rovers	Five-eighth	14	1	17	0	37
111.	Tony Graham	(Australia)	1976, 1980	Rd. 9	Debut	Wing	19	6	0	0	18
112.	John Dykes	(Australia)	1976	Rd. 10	South Sydney Rabbitohs	Prop	9	1	0	0	3
113.	Rowland Beckett	(Australia)	1976, 1978–83	Rd. 12	Debut	Hooker	79	14	0	0	50
114.	Gary Stares	(Australia)	1976, 1978–84	Rd. 12	Debut	Prop	35	2	0	0	6
115.	Mick Mullane	(Australia)	1976–83	Rd. 14	Debut	Fullback	120	53	0	0	162
116.	Peter Cox	(Australia)	1976	Rd. 15	Debut	Unknown	3	0	0	0	0
117.	Dane Sorensen	(New Zealand)	1977–83, 1985–89	Rd. 1	Debut	Prop	216	16	66	0	186
118.	Norm Thomas	(Australia)	1977	Rd. 1	Canterbury-Bankstown Bulldogs	Prop	3	0	0	0	0
119.	Gary Cameron	(Australia)	1977–80	Rd. 3	Debut	Five-eighth	35	12	0	0	36
120.	Rex Williams	(Australia)	1977–78, 1980–82	Rd. 3	Debut	Prop	29	0	0	0	0
121.	Graham Beames	(Australia)	1977	Rd. 4	Debut	Wing	2	1	0	0	3
122.	Jeff Grayshon	(England) (United Kingdom)	1977	Rd. 9	Dewsbury Rams	Prop	8	0	0	0	0
123.	David Eckersley	(England) (United Kingdom)	1977	Rd. 11	Widnes Vikings	Centre	9	0	0	0	0
124.	Steve McAlpin	(Australia)	1977	Rd. 19	Debut	Halfback	1	0	0	0	0
125.	Ossie Welsh	(Australia)	1978–81, 1983	Rd. 1	Debut	Centre	27	5	0	0	15
126.	Greg Cox	(Australia)	1978–80	Rd. 2	Balmain Tigers	Halfback	35	6	41	0	100
127.	Mick Rasmussen	(Australia)	1978	Rd. 2	Debut	Second-row	2	0	0	0	0
128.	Chris Gardner	(Australia)	1978–85	Rd. 3	Debut	Centre	128	44	13	0	154
129.	Brendan Neville	(Australia)	1978	Rd. 5	Debut	Second-row	3	0	0	0	0
130.	Scott Dudman	(Australia)	1978, 1980	Rd. 12	Debut	Lock	23	1	0	0	3
131.	Kurt Sorensen	(New Zealand)	1979–83, 1985	Rd. 1	Debut	Second-row	118	33	0	0	106
132.	David Hatch	(Australia)	1979, 1981–90	Rd. 3	Debut	Lock	186	15	0	0	54
133.	Bill Annabel	(Australia)	1979	Rd. 5	South Sydney Rabbitohs	Prop	8	0	0	0	0
134.	Grant Morton	(Australia)	1979	Rd. 5	Debut	Prop	6	0	0	0	0
135.	Geoff Scott	(Australia)	1979	Unknown	Debut	Unknown	0	0	0	0	0
136.	Barry Pearson	(Australia)	1980	Rd. 1	Manly-Warringah Sea Eagles	Hooker	12	1	0	0	3
137.	Gavin Miller	(Australia)	1980–83, 1986–92	Rd. 2	Eastern Suburbs Roosters	Second-row	180	12	0	1	43
138.	Ken Ricketts	(Australia)	1980–81	Rd. 3	Debut	Lock	10	2	0	0	6
139.	Michael Fahey	(Australia)	1980	Rd. 6	Debut	Prop	1	0	0	0	0
140.	Arthur Mountier	(Australia)	1980	Rd. 13	Eastern Suburbs Roosters	Hooker	1	0	0	0	0
141.	John Berne	(Australia)	1981, 1983	Rd. 1	Eastern Suburbs Roosters	Centre	28	7	0	0	21
142.	Ian Forrest	(Australia)	1981-83	Rd. 1	Debut	Five-eighth	37	5	0	0	17
143.	Perry Haddock	(Australia)	1981–83	Rd. 1	Debut	Halfback	44	12	3	0	43
144.	John Jarvie	(Australia)	1981–82	Rd. 1	Debut	Wing	47	9	0	0	27
145.	David Laming	(Australia)	1981, 1983–84	Rd. 1	Debut	Hooker	29	7	0	0	26
146.	Peter McNamara	(Australia)	1981–83	Rd. 5	Debut	Prop	38	1	0	0	3
147.	Col Eadie	(Australia)	1981	Rd. 7	Debut	Fullback	5	0	0	0	0
148.	Peter Saunderson	(Australia)	1981	Rd. 8	Debut	Wing	4	0	0	0	0
149.	Mark Humphries	(Australia)	1981	Rd. 17	Debut	Unknown	1	0	0	0	0
150.	Mark Wakefield	(Australia)	1981–87	Rd. 1	Debut	Five-eighth	70	6	0	0	24
151.	Jim See	(Australia)	1981–87	Rd. 22	Manly-Warringah Sea Eagles	Fullback	64	14	0	0	48
152.	Terry Murphy	(Australia)	1982–83	Rd. 1	Eastern Suburbs Roosters	Centre	22	1	0	0	4
153.	Greg Nixon	(Australia)	1982-84, 1986-87	Rd. 1	South Sydney Rabbitohs	Lock	68	16	0	0	64
154.	Gary Wright	(Australia)	1982	Rd. 1	South Sydney Rabbitohs	Five-eighth	17	6	0	0	18
155.	Steve Hardy	(Australia)	1982–83	Rd. 2	Debut	Lock	23	3	18	0	48
156.	Robert Lane	(Australia)	1982–84	Rd. 2	Debut	Halfback	19	3	0	0	12
157.	Phil Hurst	(Australia)	1982–83, 1985–87	Rd. 6	Debut	Wing	36	11	7	0	58
158.	Chris Withall	(Australia)	1982–86	Rd. 6	Debut	Second-row	31	3	0	1	13
159.	Darren Coles	(Australia)	1982, 1985–86	Rd. 10	Debut	Hooker	13	0	0	0	0
160.	Peter Kedwell	(Australia)	1982–83	Rd. 17	Debut	Hooker	4	0	0	0	0
161.	Steve Anderson	(Australia)	1983	Rd. 1	Western Suburbs Magpies	Centre	24	5	0	0	20
162.	Brett Garnon	(Australia)	1983	Rd. 1	Parramatta Eels	Centre	1	0	0	0	0
163.	Paul Merlo	(Australia)	1983–85	Rd. 1	Western Suburbs Magpies	Prop	32	3	0	0	12
164.	George Moroko	(Australia)	1983–84	Rd. 1	Western Suburbs Magpies	Second-row	21	5	0	0	20
165.	Dean Carney	(Australia)	1983–86	Rd. 1	Debut	Wing	72	28	87	0	286
166.	Andrew Ettingshausen	(Australia)	1983–00	Rd. 5	Debut	Centre	327	166	1	0	666
167.	David Burnes	(Australia)	1983	Rd. 7	Debut	Centre	6	1	0	0	4
168.	Paul McCarthy	(Australia)	1983	Rd. 12	Debut	Unknown	2	0	0	0	0
169.	John O'Connor	(Australia)	1983–86, 1988	Rd. 18	Debut	Five-eighth	27	5	0	0	20
170.	Glen Mortimer	(Australia)	1983–87	Rd. 19	Debut	Second-row	28	3	0	0	12
171.	Howard Jansen	(Australia)	1983–85	Rd. 23	Debut	Lock	25	2	1	0	10
172.	Stuart Raper	(Australia)	1983–84, 1986	Rd. 25	Debut	Second-row	3	0	0	0	0
173.	Michael Porter	(Australia)	1983–90, 1992-94	Rd. 26	Debut	Prop	149	11	0	0	44
174.	Tony Armstrong	(Australia)	1984	Rd. 1	Canterbury-Bankstown Bulldogs	Wing	23	9	75	0	186
175.	Phil Doran	(Australia)	1984	Rd. 1	Debut	Second-row	6	0	0	0	0
176.	Des O'Reilly	(Australia)	1984–85	Rd. 1	Eastern Suburbs Roosters	Prop	13	0	0	0	0
177.	Craig Borg	(Australia)	1984–85	Rd. 1	Debut	Hooker	2	0	0	0	0
178.	Mark McGaw	(Australia)	1984–92	Rd. 1	Debut	Centre	157	35	0	0	140
179.	Ray Downie	(Australia)	1984	Rd. 2	Newtown Jets	Second-row	2	0	0	0	0
180.	Peter Hammond	(Australia)	1984	Unknown	Debut	Unknown	0	0	0	0	0
181.	David Harris	(Australia)	1984–85, 1987–90	Rd. 3	Western Suburbs Magpies	Centre	40	2	0	0	8
182.	Craig Timmens	(Australia)	1984	Rd. 4	Debut	Hooker	1	0	0	0	0
183.	David Woodbury	(Australia)	1984–85	Rd. 4	Debut	Second-row	5	2	0	0	8
184.	Gary Hammond	(Australia)	1984–85	Rd. 6	Debut	Centre	7	1	0	0	4
185.	Greg Pierce	(Australia)	1984	Rd. 6	Debut	Wing	2	0	4	0	8
186.	Jim Palmer	(Australia)	1984	Rd. 7	Debut	Wing	4	2	0	0	8
187.	Jonathan Docking	(Australia)	1984–91	Rd. 9	Debut	Fullback	161	57	0	0	228
188.	Wayne Hall	(Australia)	1984	Unknown	Debut	Unknown	0	0	0	0	0
189.	Glen Steele	(Australia)	1984	Rd. 20	Debut	Hooker	5	1	0	0	4
190.	Garry Walker	(Australia)	1984–85	Rd. 20	Debut	Second-row	9	1	0	0	4
191.	Steve Robinson	(Australia)	1984	Rd. 25	Debut	Wing	2	1	0	0	4
192.	David Roods	(Australia)	1985	Rd. 1	Debut	Hooker	3	0	0	0	0
193.	Wayne Smith	(Australia)	1985–86	Rd. 1	Western Suburbs Magpies	Wing	17	3	1	0	14
194.	Errol Hillier	(Australia)	1985–88	Rd. 1	North Sydney Bears	Second-row	27	0	0	0	0
195.	Craig Dimond	(Australia)	1985–88, 1990–93	Rd. 3	Illawarra Steelers	Second-row	142	19	0	0	76
196.	Paul Kennedy	(Australia)	1985–86	Rd. 3	Debut	Halfback	14	1	0	0	4
197.	Darren Thompson	(Australia)	1985	Rd. 3	Debut	Unknown	1	0	0	0	0
198.	Shaun McNamara	(Australia)	1985	Rd. 4	Debut	Five-eighth	7	4	0	0	16
199.	Graham Quinn	(Australia)	1985	Rd. 5	St. George Dragons	Centre	10	1	0	0	4
200.	Brian Noble	(England) (United Kingdom)	1985	Rd. 7	Bradford Northern	Hooker	8	1	0	0	4
201.	Tony Hill	(Australia)	1985	Rd. 8	Debut	Lock	2	0	0	0	0
202.	Barry Russell	(Australia)	1985, 1987–91	Rd. 8	Debut	Halfback	77	31	0	0	124
203.	Mark Ellison	(Australia)	1985–86	Rd. 12	South Sydney Rabbitohs	Second-row	17	1	7	0	18
204.	Gary Burns	(Australia)	1985–86	Rd. 15	Debut	Hooker	13	0	0	0	0
205.	Craig Tracey	(Australia)	1985–88	Rd. 19	Debut	Hooker	10	0	0	0	0
206.	Richard Laurie	(Australia)	1985	Rd. 16	Debut	Unknown	2	0	0	0	0
207.	Roger McLeod	(Australia)	1985	Rd. 23	Debut	Unknown	2	0	0	0	0
208.	Jim Leis	(Australia)	1986–87	Rd. 1	Canterbury-Bankstown Bulldogs	Lock	9	1	0	0	4
209.	Michael Wicks	(Australia)	1986–87	Rd. 2	Illawarra Steelers	Prop	10	0	0	0	0
210.	Brad Perry	(Australia)	1986–88	Rd. 2	Debut	Prop	29	0	0	0	0
211.	Michael Speechley	(Australia)	1986–92	Rd. 4	South Sydney Rabbitohs	Five-eighth	120	13	0	4	56
212.	Phil Dotti	(Australia)	1986	Rd. 4	Debut	Wing	7	2	0	0	8
213.	Santi Masa	(Australia)	1986	Rd. 4	Debut	Unknown	1	0	0	0	0
214.	Greg Davies	(Australia)	1986–89	Rd. 5	Debut	Wing	27	2	0	0	8
215.	Scott Gustard	(Australia)	1986–87	Rd. 6	Debut	Halfback	21	2	0	0	8
216.	Malcolm Wheeler	(Australia)	1986, 1988–91	Rd. 7	Debut	Prop	31	2	0	0	8
217.	Sean Watson	(Australia)	1986–89	Rd. 15	Debut	Wing	45	17	92	0	252
218.	Bob Jackson	(Australia)	1986	Rd. 17	Penrith Panthers	Prop	8	1	4	0	12
219.	Guy Picken	(Australia)	1986–89	Rd. 20	Debut	Prop	24	0	0	0	0
220.	Alan Wilson	(Australia)	1986–91, 1994	Rd. 21	Debut	Second-row	105	37	185	2	520
221.	Glenn Coleman	(Australia)	1986–94	Rd. 22	Debut	Wing	123	41	0	0	164
222.	Brett Longville	(Australia)	1986	Rd. 24	Debut	Wing	2	0	0	0	0
223.	Denis Fricot	(Australia)	1987–88	Rd. 1	Debut	Wing	12	1	1	0	6
224.	Ron Quinn	(Australia)	1987–88	Rd. 1	Parramatta Eels	Halfback	37	4	0	0	16
225.	Dan Stains	(Australia)	1987–94	Rd. 1	Debut	Second-row	135	6	0	4	32
226.	Jean Desfosses	(Australia)	1987	Rd. 2	Debut	Hooker	6	0	0	0	0
227.	Brett Maloney	(Australia)	1987	Unknown	Debut	Unknown	0	0	0	0	0
228.	Greg Lukins	(Australia)	1987	Rd. 6	Debut	Unknown	2	0	0	0	0
229.	Scott Freestone	(Australia)	1987–89	Rd. 10	Debut	Prop	8	0	0	0	0
230.	Mike Gregory	(England) (United Kingdom)	1987	Rd. 16	Warrington Wolves	Second-row	9	1	0	0	4
231.	Mark Lee	(Australia)	1987	Rd. 19	Debut	Second-row	4	0	0	0	0
232.	John Kambas	(Australia)	1987–88	Rd. 23	South Sydney Rabbitohs	Lock	6	0	3	0	6
233.	Terry Dolling	(Australia)	1987	Rd. 25	Debut	Unknown	3	0	0	0	0
234.	Tony Paton	(Australia)	1988	Rd. 2	Debut	Wing	3	2	0	0	8
235.	Paul Bishop	(Australia)	1988–89	Rd. 4	Debut	Halfback	13	2	0	0	8
236.	Danny Lee	(Australia)	1988–98	Rd. 18	Debut	Prop	212	13	0	0	52
237.	John Davidson	(Australia)	1989–90	Rd. 1	Balmain Tigers	Wing	39	11	2	0	48
238.	Ken Ebb	(Australia)	1989–92	Rd. 1	Debut	Lock	27	2	0	0	8
239.	Glenn Rogers	(Australia)	1989	Rd. 2	Debut	Unknown	2	0	0	0	0
240.	Grant Goodlet	(Australia)	1989	Rd. 3	Debut	Centre	6	1	1	0	6
241.	Arthur Pappas	(Australia)	1989–90	Rd. 7	Debut	Second-row	29	1	13	0	30
242.	Chris Quinn	(Australia)	1989–94	Rd. 9	Debut	Fullback	72	10	0	0	40
243.	Bill Dunn	(Australia)	1989–90	Rd. 11	Debut	Second-row	7	0	0	0	0
244.	Paul Vannet	(England)	1989	Rd. 12	Debut	Second-row	1	0	0	0	0
245.	Jeff Martin	(Australia)	1989, 1991	Rd. 13	Debut	Centre	5	0	0	0	0
246.	Luke Massey	(Australia)	1989–92	Rd. 17	Debut	Prop	53	1	0	0	4
247.	Mitch Healey	(Australia)	1989–00	Rd. 17	Debut	Five-eighth	222	33	139	8	418
248.	Laurie Spina	(Australia)	1990	Rd. 1	Eastern Suburbs Roosters	Halfback	22	5	0	0	20
249.	Matthew Corkery	(Australia)	1990–91	Rd. 1	Canberra Raiders	Wing	17	3	28	0	68
250.	Michael Wilkinson	(Australia)	1990	Rd. 7	Debut	Unknown	3	0	0	0	0
251.	Jason Croker	(Australia)	1990	Rd. 15	Debut	Lock	1	0	0	0	0
252.	Aaron Raper	(Australia)	1990, 1992–93, 1995	Rd. 21	Debut	Hooker	57	7	0	0	28
253.	Les Davidson	(Australia)	1991–98	Rd. 1	South Sydney Rabbitohs	Second-row	133	13	0	0	52
254.	Greg Carberry	(Australia)	1991	Rd. 1	Illawarra Steelers	Wing	14	5	33	0	86
255.	Craig Teevan	(Australia)	1991	Rd. 2	Brisbane Broncos	Halfback	13	0	3	0	6
256.	Leo Tanoi	(Australia)	1991	Rd. 2	Debut	Wing	12	3	0	0	12
257.	Paul Bell	(Australia)	1991–94	Rd. 5	Debut	Centre	58	7	0	0	28
258.	Michael Elliott	(Australia)	1991	Rd. 6	Debut	Five-eighth	6	2	0	0	8
259.	John McKelleher	(Australia)	1991–93	Rd. 9	Debut	Fullback	10	1	0	0	4
260.	Dave Boughton	(Australia)	1991–96	Rd. 13	Debut	Lock	82	10	0	0	40
261.	Darren Higgins	(Australia)	1991–95	Rd. 15	St. George Dragons	Centre	44	10	0	0	40
262.	Andrew Hick	(Australia)	1991–95	Rd. 18	Debut	Prop	44	3	0	0	12
263.	Stephen Walsh	(Australia)	1991	Rd. 22	Debut	Unknown	1	0	0	0	0
264.	Lindsay Bowne	(Australia)	1992–93	Rd. 1	Debut	Wing	26	9	8	0	52
265.	Charlie Saab	(Australia)	1992	Rd. 1	South Sydney Rabbitohs	Centre	5	2	0	0	8
266.	David Trewhella	(Australia)	1992	Rd. 1	Eastern Suburbs Roosters	Hooker	9	0	0	0	0
267.	Robbie Kearns	(Australia)	1992–95	Rd. 2	Debut	Prop	75	9	2	0	40
268.	Kurt Wrigley	(Australia)	1992–94	Rd. 2	Debut	Fullback	21	3	3	0	18
269.	Stuart Topper	(Australia)	1992–94	Rd. 2	Debut	Halfback	14	2	0	0	8
270.	Geoff Lynch	(Australia)	1992	Rd. 4	Debut	Five-eighth	2	0	0	0	0
271.	Gary Lester	(Australia)	1992–93	Rd. 7	Debut	Halfback	6	2	0	0	8
272.	Paul Evans	(Australia)	1992–93	Rd. 12	Debut	Wing	24	5	0	0	20
273.	Sean Ryan	(Australia)	1992, 1995–01	Rd. 18	Debut	Second-row	128	19	0	0	76
274.	Joe Vitanza	(Australia)	1992	Rd. 21	Penrith Panthers	Prop	1	0	0	0	0
275.	Nick Graham	(Australia)	1992–93, 1997–03	Rd. 22	Debut	Lock	134	16	0	0	64
276.	Dean Morris	(Australia)	1993	Rd. 2	St. George Dragons	Centre	1	0	0	0	0
277.	Chris Slacksmith	(Australia)	1993	Rd. 2	Debut	Lock	7	0	0	0	0
278.	Jason Hudson	(Australia)	1993	Rd. 3	Debut	Wing	5	0	0	0	0
279.	Jason McLean	(Australia)	1993	Rd. 4	Canterbury-Bankstown Bulldogs	Fullback	1	0	0	0	0
280.	Len Barton	(Australia)	1993	Rd. 6	Illawarra Steelers	Prop	3	0	0	0	0
281.	Sean Kelly	(Australia)	1993	Rd. 8	Debut	Wing	2	1	0	0	4
282.	Adam Ritson	(Australia)	1993–95	Rd. 10	Debut	Prop	29	1	0	0	4
283.	Troy Stone	(Australia)	1993	Rd. 11	Debut	Prop	5	0	0	0	0
284.	Andrew Pierce	(Australia)	1993–96, 1999–02	Rd. 16	Debut	Second-row	146	7	0	0	28
285.	Ben Sammut	(Australia) (Malta)	1993–98, 2001	Rd. 16	Debut	Fullback	57	9	1	0	38
286.	Steve Henderson	(Australia)	1993–94	Rd. 19	Debut	Second-row	4	0	0	0	0
287.	Paul Hallum	(Australia)	1993	Rd. 22	Debut	Prop	1	0	0	0	0
288.	Richie Barnett	(New Zealand)	1994–97	Rd. 1	Debut	Wing	67	29	0	0	116
289.	Eion Crossan	(New Zealand)	1994–95	Rd. 1	South Sydney Rabbitohs	Wing	23	8	64	0	160
290.	Paul Green	(Australia)	1994–98	Rd. 1	Debut	Halfback	95	24	3	0	102
291.	Andrew Neave	(Australia)	1994–95	Rd. 1	Debut	Hooker	32	8	0	0	32
292.	David Peachey	(Australia)	1994–05	Rd. 1	Debut	Fullback	232	110	0	0	440
293.	Adam Maher	(Australia)	1994-96	Rd. 3	Debut	Second-row	43	1?	0	0	4
294.	Geoff Bell	(Australia) (Scotland)	1994–98	Rd. 4	Debut	Centre	78	24	0	0	96
295.	Paul Doolan	(Australia)	1994–95	Rd. 7	Canterbury-Bankstown Bulldogs	Wing	13	1	0	0	4
296.	Nathan Long	(Australia)	1994–01	Rd. 10	Debut	Second-row	139	8	0	0	32
297.	Dave Watson	(New Zealand)	1994	Rd. 12	Bradford Northern	Fullback	9	0	0	0	0
298.	Scott Brown	(Australia)	1994	Rd. 20	Debut	Five-eighth	1	0	0	0	0
299.	Craig Greenhill	(Australia)	1994–98	Rd. 22	Debut	Prop	55	4	0	0	16
300.	Adam Dykes	(Australia)	1995–01, 2005–07	Rd. 1	Debut	Five-eighth	183	47	1	3	193
301.	Mat Rogers	(Australia)	1995–01	Rd. 1	Debut	Wing	123	75	406	0	1112
302.	Paul Fisher	(Australia)	1995–97	Rd. 2	Debut	Hooker	9	0	0	0	0
303.	Paul Donaghy	(Australia)	1995–00	Rd. 4	Debut	Centre	48	17	0	0	68
304.	Matt Daylight	(Australia) (Scotland)	1995, 2001	Rd. 6	Debut	Wing	5	1	0	0	4
305.	Brian Laumatia	(New Zealand) (Samoa)	1995–97	Rd. 9	Debut	Wing	7	1	0	0	4
306.	Dean Treister	(Australia)	1995–03	Rd. 9	Debut	Hooker	161	16	0	0	64
307.	Tawera Nikau	(New Zealand)	1995–97	Rd. 10	Castleford Tigers	Lock	61	4	0	0	16
308.	Allan Bateman	(United Kingdom) (Wales)	1995–96	Rd. 11	Warrington Wolves	Wing	33	6	0	0	24
309.	Gavin Clinch	(Australia) (Republic of Ireland)	1995	Rd. 20	Debut	Halfback	1	1	0	0	4
310.	Dion Cope	(Australia)	1995–96	Rd. 20	Debut	Centre	5	0	0	0	0
311.	Gavin Jones	(Australia)	1996	Rd. 2	North Sydney Bears	Prop	16	0	0	0	0
312.	Russell Richardson	(Australia)	1996–01	Rd. 1	Debut	Centre	92	33	0	0	132
313.	Tiaan Strauss	(Australia) (South Africa)	1996–97	Rd. 15	Debut	Prop	14	1	0	0	4
314.	Martin Lang	(Australia)	1996–01	Rd. 21	Debut	Prop	109	2	0	0	8
315.	Chris McKenna	(Australia)	1997–02	Rd. 1	South Queensland Crushers	Centre	118	29	0	0	116
316.	Jason Stevens	(Australia)	1997–05	Rd. 1	St. George Dragons	Prop	167	10	0	0	40
317.	Stuart Pierce	(Australia)	1997–98, 2000–01	Rd. 2	Debut	Prop	10	0	0	0	0
318.	Brett Howland	(Australia)	1997–00	Rd. 4	Debut	Wing	68	38	0	0	152
319.	Wade Forrester	(Australia)	1997–99	Rd. 6	Debut	Second-row	37	3	1	0	14
320.	Paul Stevens	(Australia)	1997	Unknown	London Broncos	Prop	0	0	0	0	0
321.	Tim Maddison	(Australia)	1998–00	Rd. 3	Hunter Mariners	Prop	40	2	0	0	8
322.	Luke Stuart	(Australia)	1998–01	Rd. 9	Debut	Second-row	52	5	0	0	20
323.	Nick Zisti	(Australia) (Italy)	1998	Rd. 10	South Sydney Rabbitohs	Wing	11	4	0	0	16
324.	Colin Best	(Australia)	1998–02, 2011–12	Rd. 12	Debut	Wing	126	56	0	0	224
325.	Blaine Stanley	(Australia)	1998–00	Rd. 12	Debut	Halfback	28	7	26	0	80
326.	Sam Isemonger	(Australia)	1998–00, 2002–05	Rd. 18	Debut	Second-row	74	9	0	0	36
327.	Shannon Donato	(Australia) (Italy)	1998–01	Rd. 21	South Sydney Rabbitohs	Hooker	34	3	0	0	12
328.	Jason Ferris	(Australia)	1999–01	Rd. 1	North Queensland Cowboys	Five-eighth	53	9	46	1	129
329.	Preston Campbell	(Australia)	1999–02	Rd. 11	Gold Coast Chargers	Halfback	54	24	24	0	144
330.	Paul Mellor	(Australia)	1999–02, 2005	Rd. 12	Canterbury-Bankstown Bulldogs	Centre	104	43	0	0	172
331.	Paul McNicholas	(Australia) (Republic of Ireland)	2000–01	Rd. 1	South Sydney Rabbitohs	Second-row	30	1	0	0	4
332.	Ronald Prince	(Australia)	2000–01	Rd. 14	Debut	Wing	13	4	1	0	18
333.	Chris Beattie	(Australia)	2000–04	Rd. 14	Debut	Prop	86	6	0	0	24
334.	Scott Murray	(Australia)	2000–01	Rd. 26	South Sydney Rabbitohs	Five-eighth	3	1	0	0	4
335.	Luke Branighan	(Australia) (Malta)	2001	Rd. 9	St. George Illawarra Dragons	Halfback	1	0	0	0	0
336.	Mark Capelin	(Australia)	2001	Rd. 9	Debut	Hooker	2	0	0	0	0
337.	Brent Grose	(Australia)	2001	Rd. 12	Debut	Wing	15	5	0	0	20
338.	Damien Mostyn	(Australia)	2001	Rd. 13	Sydney City Roosters	Fullback	8	6	0	0	24
339.	Paul Gallen	(Australia)	2001–19	Rd. 15	Debut	Lock	348	63	2	1	257
340.	Matthew Johns	(Australia)	2002	Rd. 1	Wigan Warriors	Five-eighth	21	8	0	0	32
341.	Brett Kimmorley	(Australia)	2002–08	Rd. 1	Northern Eagles	Halfback	140	33	165	5	467
342.	Karl Lovell	(Australia)	2002	Rd. 1	Northern Eagles	Second-row	16	4	0	0	16
343.	Matthew Rieck	(Australia)	2002–04	Rd. 1	Penrith Panthers	Wing	55	31	0	0	124
344.	Danny Nutley	(Australia)	2002–05, 2008	Rd. 1	Warrington Wolves	Prop	118	10	0	0	40
345.	Phil Bailey	(Australia)	2002–06	Rd. 2	Northern Eagles	Second-row	103	32	0	0	128
346.	Dean Bosnich	(Australia)	2002–04	Rd. 3	Debut	Hooker	45	5	0	0	20
347.	Luke MacDougall	(Australia)	2002	Rd. 4	Debut	Wing	7	4	0	0	16
348.	Paul Franze	(Australia) (Italy)	2002–04	Rd. 6	Debut	Centre	29	11	0	0	44
349.	Ryan McGoldrick	(Australia) (United States)	2002, 2004–05	Rd. 6	Debut	Centre	35	10	0	0	40
350.	Pat Gibson	(Australia)	2002–04	Rd. 7	Debut	Hooker	30	6	0	0	24
351.	Greg Bird	(Australia)	2002–08	Rd. 7	Debut	Lock	106	35	6	0	152
352.	Matt Bickerstaff	(Australia)	2002–04	Rd. 8	South Queensland Crushers	Second-row	59	5	0	0	20
353.	Jared Taylor	(Australia) (France)	2002	Rd. 11	Debut	Fullback	2	0	0	0	0
354.	Nick Paterson	(Australia)	2002–03	Rd. 12	North Queensland Cowboys	Prop	3	0	0	0	0
355.	Brett Sargent	(Australia)	2002	Rd. 19	Debut	Second-row	3	0	0	0	0
356.	Jye Mullane	(Australia)	2002–03	Rd. 22	Debut	Five-eighth	13	3	0	0	12
357.	Jason Kent	(Australia)	2003–04	Rd. 1	St. George Illawarra Dragons	Centre	22	4	0	0	16
358.	Nick Youngquest	(Australia)	2003	Rd. 1	Debut	Wing	5	0	0	0	0
359.	Matt Hilder	(Australia)	2003–06	Rd. 1	Debut	Hooker	81	19	29	0	134
360.	Don Tweddle	(Australia)	2003	Rd. 1	Debut	Prop	5	0	0	0	0
361.	Shaun Wessell	(Australia)	2003	Rd. 1	Debut	Prop	3	0	0	0	0
362.	Laloa Milford	(Samoa)	2003	Rd. 6	Wests Tigers	Wing	13	2	0	0	8
363.	Andrew Emelio	(Australia) (Tonga)	2003	Rd. 8	Debut	Centre	7	1	0	0	4
364.	Michael Sullivan	(Australia)	2003–05	Rd. 9	Northern Eagles	Five-eighth	61	13	0	1	53
365.	Nathan Vagg	(Australia)	2003	Rd. 9	Debut	Prop	2	0	0	0	0
366.	Jarrad Anderson	(Australia)	2003	Rd. 13	Debut	Centre	14	6	35	0	94
367.	Daniel Dumas	(Australia)	2003–04	Rd. 13	Debut	Lock	15	1	0	0	4
368.	Andrew Dallalana	(Australia) (Italy)	2003	Rd. 15	Debut	Halfback	5	0	0	0	0
369.	Russell Aitken	(Australia)	2003–05	Rd. 18	Debut	Halfback	7	2	0	0	8
370.	Dale Newton	(Australia)	2003	Rd. 19	Debut	Prop	4	0	0	0	0
371.	Keith Galloway	(Australia)	2003–05	Rd. 19	Debut	Second-row	37	4	0	0	16
372.	Roy Friend	(Australia)	2003	Rd. 20	Debut	Prop	6	1	0	0	4
373.	David Simmons	(Australia)	2003–09	Rd. 22	Debut	Wing	112	54	0	0	216
374.	Reece Williams	(Australia)	2003–09	Rd. 23	Debut	Second-row	98	9	0	0	36
375.	Andrew Lomu	(New Zealand) (Tonga)	2004–05	Rd. 1	Sydney Roosters	Second-row	22	1	0	0	4
376.	Hassan Saleh	(Australia) (Lebanon)	2004	Rd. 1	St. George Illawarra Dragons	Wing	3	1	0	0	4
377.	Nathan Merritt	(Australia)	2004–05	Rd. 2	South Sydney Rabbitohs	Wing	19	8	6	0	44
378.	Nigel Vagana	(New Zealand) (Samoa)	2004–06	Rd. 5	Bulldogs	Centre	61	32	0	0	128
379.	Jason Williams	(New Zealand)	2004	Rd. 5	Debut	Prop	6	0	0	0	0
380.	Michael Greenfield	(Australia)	2004	Rd. 22	Debut	Prop	1	0	0	0	0
381.	Luke Covell	(New Zealand)	2005–10	Rd. 1	Wests Tigers	Wing	131	55	364	0	948
382.	Hutch Maiava	(New Zealand) (Samoa)	2005–06	Rd. 1	Bulldogs	Prop	40	2	0	0	8
383.	James Stosic	(New Zealand)	2005–06	Rd. 3	Debut	Prop	24	0	0	0	0
384.	Phillip Leuluai	(New Zealand) (Samoa)	2005–07	Rd. 7	Debut	Second-row	30	1	0	0	4
385.	Vince Mellars	(New Zealand)	2005	Rd. 17	New Zealand Warriors	Centre	5	2	0	0	8
386.	Kevin Kingston	(Australia)	2005–08	Rd. 19	Debut	Hooker	59	4	0	0	16
387.	Cameron Ciraldo	(Australia) (Italy)	2005–07	Rd. 22	Debut	Second-row	19	1	0	0	4
388.	Beau Scott	(Australia)	2005–06	Rd. 22	Debut	Centre	28	7	0	0	28
389.	Clifford Manua	(New Zealand)	2005	Rd. 24	Debut	Prop	2	0	0	0	0
390.	Darren Albert	(Australia)	2006	Rd. 1	St. Helens	Wing	23	12	0	0	48
391.	Ben Ross	(Australia)	2006–09, 2012–13	Rd. 1	Penrith Panthers	Prop	86	3	0	0	12
392.	Lance Thompson	(Australia)	2006–08	Rd. 1	St. George Illawarra Dragons	Second-row	38	5	1	0	22
393.	Luke Douglas	(Australia) (Scotland)	2006–11	Rd. 1	Debut	Prop	146	10	0	0	40
394.	Tevita Latu	(New Zealand) (Tonga)	2006	Rd. 1	New Zealand Warriors	Hooker	10	1	0	0	4
395.	Luke Harlen	(Australia)	2006, 2010	Rd. 3	Debut	Second-row	5	0	0	0	0
396.	Darren Mapp	(Australia)	2006	Rd. 5	Brisbane Broncos	Second-row	2	0	0	0	0
397.	Brett Kearney	(Australia)	2006–09	Rd. 6	South Sydney Rabbitohs	Fullback	49	20	0	0	80
398.	Brett Kelly	(Australia)	2006	Rd. 7	Debut	Wing	1	0	0	0	0
399.	Tony Caine	(Australia)	2006, 2009	Rd. 12	Debut	Hooker	7	0	0	0	0
400.	Richard Villasanti	(Australia)	2006	Rd. 12	New Zealand Warriors	Prop	7	1	0	0	4
401.	Ben Pomeroy	(Australia)	2006–13	Rd. 17	Penrith Panthers	Centre	158	53	0	0	212
402.	Toshio Laiseni	(Tonga)	2006	Rd. 18	Debut	Fullback	1	0	0	0	0
403.	Leon Bott	(Australia)	2006	Rd. 19	Brisbane Broncos	Wing	1	0	0	0	0
404.	Mitch Brown	(Australia)	2006–09, 2015–16	Rd. 24	Debut	Wing	44	9	0	0	36
405.	Fraser Anderson	(New Zealand) (Tonga)	2007–08	Rd. 1	Brisbane Broncos	Second-row	43	12	0	0	48
406.	Josh Hannay	(Australia)	2007	Rd. 1	North Queensland Cowboys	Centre	3	0	0	0	0
407.	Craig Stapleton	(Australia)	2007	Rd. 1	Penrith Panthers	Prop	24	0	0	0	0
408.	Isaac De Gois	(Australia) (Portugal)	2007–08, 2012–14	Rd. 1	Wests Tigers	Hooker	106	16	0	0	64
409.	Jacob Selmes	(Australia)	2007–09	Rd. 1	Debut	Prop	18	0	0	0	0
410.	Dustin Cooper	(Australia)	2007–08	Rd. 3	Newcastle Knights	Second-row	6	0	0	0	0
411.	Brett Seymour	(Australia)	2007–09	Rd. 4	Brisbane Broncos	Five-eighth	39	6	11	1	47
412.	Dayne Weston	(Australia)	2007	Rd. 5	Debut	Second-row	10	0	0	0	0
413.	Misi Taulapapa	(New Zealand) (Samoa)	2007–09	Rd. 8	New Zealand Warriors	Wing	33	7	0	0	28
414.	Henry Perenara	(New Zealand)	2007	Rd. 8	Parramatta Eels	Five-eighth	9	2	0	0	8
415.	Paul Stephenson	(Australia)	2007–08	Rd. 12	Manly-Warringah Sea Eagles	Second-row	12	1	0	0	4
416.	Anthony Watts	(Australia)	2007	Rd. 13	Debut	Halfback	5	0	0	0	0
417.	Eddie Su'a	(Australia) (Portugal)	2007	Rd. 19	Debut	Prop	6	0	0	0	0
418.	Dane Nielsen	(Australia)	2007	Rd. 19	Debut	Centre	1	0	0	0	0
419.	Bryson Goodwin	(New Zealand)	2007–08, 2020	Rd. 24	Debut	Wing	16	5	1	0	22
420.	Adam Peek	(Australia)	2008	Rd. 1	St. George Illawarra Dragons	Prop	21	0	0	0	0
421.	Bryan Norrie	(Australia)	2008–09	Rd. 1	Penrith Panthers	Prop	25	0	0	0	0
422.	Blake Green	(Australia)	2008–09	Rd. 3	Parramatta Eels	Five-eighth	19	1	0	0	4
423.	Sam Moa	(New Zealand) (Tonga)	2008	Rd. 7	Debut	Prop	1	0	0	0	0
424.	Terence Seu Seu	(New Zealand) (Samoa)	2008–09	Rd. 7	Newcastle Knights	Hooker	32	1	0	0	4
425.	Kade Snowden	(Australia) (Italy)	2008–11	Rd. 9	Newcastle Knights	Prop	82	5	0	0	20
426.	Grant Millington	(Australia)	2008–10	Rd. 10	Debut	Second-row	49	7	0	0	28
427.	Jayson Bukuya	(Australia) (Fiji)	2008–13, 2015–19	Rd. 11	Debut	Second-row	168	24	0	0	96
428.	Karl Filiga	(New Zealand)	2008	Rd. 13	Debut	Centre	1	0	0	0	0
429.	Blake Ferguson	(Australia)	2009–10	Rd. 1	Debut	Wing	42	16	0	0	64
430.	Trent Barrett	(Australia)	2009–10	Rd. 1	Wigan Warriors	Five-eighth	36	5	0	3	23
431.	Corey Hughes	(Australia)	2009	Rd. 1	Bulldogs	Hooker	21	0	0	0	0
432.	Anthony Tupou	(Australia) (Tonga)	2009–15	Rd. 1	Sydney Roosters	Second-row	125	10	0	0	40
433.	Reni Maitua	(Australia) (Samoa)	2009	Rd. 2	Bulldogs	Lock	8	0	0	0	0
434.	Jack Afamasaga	(New Zealand)	2009	Rd. 4	Manly-Warringah Sea Eagles	Second-row	10	0	0	0	0
435.	Jon Mannah	(Australia)	2009, 2011	Rd. 5	Debut	Prop	24	2	0	0	8
436.	Matthew Wright	(Australia) (Samoa)	2009, 2011–13	Rd. 5	Debut	Wing	62	12	6	0	60
437.	Ian Donnelly	(Australia)	2009	Rd. 6	Gold Coast Titans	Prop	7	0	0	0	0
438.	Bronx Goodwin	(New Zealand)	2009	Rd. 8	Canberra Raiders	Fullback	4	0	0	0	0
439.	Atelea Vea	(Australia) (Tonga)	2009	Rd. 10	Debut	Second-row	8	0	0	0	0
440.	Nathan Stapleton	(Australia)	2009–14	Rd. 11	Debut	Wing	61	17	18	0	104
441.	Scott Porter	(Australia)	2009–11	Rd. 12	Debut	Halfback	22	0	14	0	28
442.	Tim Weyman	(Australia)	2009	Rd. 23	Debut	Prop	1	0	0	0	0
443.	Lancen Joudo	(Australia)	2009–10	Rd. 23	Debut	Hooker	3	0	0	0	0
444.	Isaac Gordon	(Australia)	2010–12	Rd. 1	Debut	Wing	29	10	0	0	40
445.	John Morris	(Australia)	2010–14	Rd. 1	Wests Tigers	Hooker	105	9	0	1	37
446.	Adam Cuthbertson	(Australia)	2010	Rd. 1	Manly-Warringah Sea Eagles	Prop	12	0	0	0	0
447.	Josh Cordoba	(Australia)	2010–11	Rd. 1	Parramatta Eels	Prop	36	2	0	0	8
448.	Albert Kelly	(Australia)	2010–11	Rd. 1	Debut	Five-eighth	14	2	0	0	8
449.	Paul Aiton	(Papua New Guinea)	2010–11	Rd. 1	Penrith Panthers	Hooker	36	5	0	0	20
450.	Dean Collis	(Australia)	2010–11	Rd. 3	Wests Tigers	Centre	24	7	0	0	28
451.	Stuart Flanagan	(Australia) (Hungary)	2010–11	Rd. 3	Canberra Raiders	Hooker	16	1	0	0	4
452.	Siosaia Vave	(Australia) (Tonga)	2010–11, 2014	Rd. 3	Debut	Prop	32	2	0	0	8
453.	Taulima Tautai	(New Zealand) (Samoa)	2010–11	Rd. 4	Parramatta Eels	Second-row	33	4	0	0	16
454.	Tim Smith	(Australia)	2010–11	Rd. 4	Wigan Warriors	Halfback	19	5	4	1	29
455.	Broderick Wright	(Australia)	2010–11	Rd. 6	Parramatta Eels	Second-row	27	0	0	0	0
456.	Nathan Gardner	(Australia)	2010–14	Rd. 10	Debut	Fullback	43	17	11	0	90
457.	Ricky Leutele	(Australia) (Samoa)	2010–18	Rd. 24	Debut	Centre	128	30	35	0	120
458.	Trent Grubb	(Australia)	2010	Rd. 26	Debut	Second-row	1	0	0	0	0
459.	John Williams	(Australia)	2011-12	Rd. 1	North Queensland Cowboys	Wing	32	12	27	0	102
460.	Wade Graham	(Australia) (Portugal)	2011–23	Rd. 1	Penrith Panthers	Second-row	254	41	0	2	166
461.	Jeremy Smith	(New Zealand)	2011–12	Rd. 1	St. George Illawarra Dragons	Second-row	42	7	0	0	28
462.	Stewart Mills	(Australia)	2011–13	Rd. 10	Debut	Wing	16	6	0	0	24
463.	Chad Townsend	(Australia)	2011–13, 2016–21	Rd. 13	Debut	Halfback	146	28	140	10	402
464.	Sam Tagataese	(New Zealand) (Samoa)	2011–17	Rd. 15	Gold Coast Titans	Prop	117	9	0	0	36
465.	Tyson Frizell	(Australia) (Wales)	2011–12	Rd. 21	Debut	Second-row	12	2	0	0	8
466.	Todd Carney	(Australia)	2012–14	Rd. 1	Sydney Roosters	Five-eighth	51	8	106	5	249
467.	Bryce Gibbs	(Australia)	2012–14	Rd. 1	Wests Tigers	Prop	42	1	0	0	4
468.	Andrew Fifita	(Australia) (Tonga)	2012–22	Rd. 1	Wests Tigers	Prop	212	32	0	0	128
469.	Jon Green	(Australia)	2012–13	Rd. 2	St. George Illawarra Dragons	Prop	8	0	0	0	0
470.	Mark Taufua	(Australia) (Samoa)	2012–13	Rd. 2	Newcastle Knights	Prop	21	1	0	0	4
471.	Jeff Robson	(Australia)	2012–15	Rd. 3	Parramatta Eels	Halfback	92	18	0	1	73
472.	Michael Gordon	(Australia)	2013–15	Rd. 1	Penrith Panthers	Fullback	71	18	164	0	400
473.	Jonathan Wright	(Australia)	2013–14	Rd. 1	Canterbury-Bankstown Bulldogs	Centre	41	8	0	0	32
474.	Beau Ryan	(Australia)	2013–14	Rd. 1	Wests Tigers	Wing	22	7	0	0	28
475.	Luke Lewis	(Australia)	2013–18	Rd. 1	Penrith Panthers	Second-row	116	33	0	0	132
476.	Chris Heighington	(Australia) (England)	2013–17	Rd. 1	Wests Tigers	Prop	116	2	0	0	8
477.	Sosaia Feki	(New Zealand) (Tonga)	2013–19	Rd. 8	Debut	Wing	148	67	0	0	268
478.	Tyrone Peachey	(Australia)	2013	Rd. 10	Debut	Lock	7	1	0	0	4
479.	Tupou Sopoaga	(New Zealand) (Cook Islands)	2013–14	Rd. 26	Debut	Second-row	16	0	0	0	0
480.	Blake Ayshford	(Australia)	2014–15	Rd. 1	Wests Tigers	Centre	20	1	0	0	4
481.	Daniel Holdsworth	(Australia)	2014	Rd. 1	Hull F.C.	Halfback	8	0	0	1	1
482.	Matt Prior	(Australia)	2014–19	Rd. 1	St. George Illawarra Dragons	Prop	133	6	0	0	24
483.	Tinirau Arona	(New Zealand) (Cook Islands)	2014–15	Rd. 1	Sydney Roosters	Lock	33	3	0	0	12
484.	Penani Manumalealii	(Samoa)	2014	Rd. 2	Debut	Five-eighth	2	0	0	0	0
485.	Michael Lichaa	(Australia) (Lebanon)	2014	Rd. 2	Debut	Hooker	15	0	0	0	0
486.	David Fifita	(Australia) (Tonga)	2014-16	Rd. 2	Debut	Prop	19	0	0	0	0
487.	Junior Roqica	(Australia) (Fiji)	2014	Rd. 11	Debut	Second-row	6	0	0	0	0
488.	Jacob Gagan	(Australia)	2014	Rd. 13	Debut	Wing	7	5	0	0	20
489.	Fa'amanu Brown	(New Zealand) (Samoa)	2014, 2016–17	Rd. 13	Debut	Five-eighth	24	3	0	0	12
490.	Tim Robinson	(Australia)	2014–15	Rd. 17	Manly-Warringah Sea Eagles	Prop	9	1	0	0	4
491.	Pat Politoni	(Australia) (Tonga)	2014–15	Rd. 17	Wests Tigers	Hooker	11	1	0	0	4
492.	Valentine Holmes	(Australia)	2014–18	Rd. 21	Debut	Fullback	105	66	51	3	369
493.	Sione Masima	(Australia)	2014	Rd. 24	Debut	Second-row	3	0	0	0	0
494.	Scott Sorensen	(Australia)	2014, 2018–20	Rd. 24	Debut	Second-row	37	1	0	0	4
495.	Patrice Siolo	(New Zealand)	2014	Rd. 25	Debut	Second-row	1	0	0	0	0
496.	Ben Barba	(Australia)	2015–16	Rd. 1	Brisbane Broncos	Fullback	46	19	0	0	76
497.	Gerard Beale	(New Zealand)	2015–17	Rd. 1	St. George Illawarra Dragons	Centre	70	14	0	0	56
498.	Michael Ennis	(Australia)	2015–16	Rd. 1	Canterbury-Bankstown Bulldogs	Hooker	51	5	1	0	22
499.	Jack Bird	(Australia)	2015–17	Rd. 4	Debut	Centre	66	17	0	0	68
500.	Sami Sauiluma	(Australia)	2015	Rd. 9	Canberra Raiders	Wing	3	0	0	0	0
501.	James Maloney	(Australia)	2016–17	Rd. 1	Sydney Roosters	Five-eighth	45	11	165	6	380
502.	Joseph Paulo	(Australia) (Samoa) (United States)	2016–18	Rd. 2	Parramatta Eels	Lock	51	1	0	0	4
503.	Matt McIlwrick	(New Zealand)	2016	Rd. 18	Sydney Roosters	Hooker	2	0	0	0	0
504.	Jesse Sene-Lefao	(New Zealand) (Samoa)	2016	Rd. 18	Manly Warringah Sea Eagles	Second-row	6	0	0	0	0
505.	Kurt Capewell	(Australia)	2016–19	Rd. 18	Debut	Second-row	64	6	0	0	24
506.	Jayden Brailey	(Australia)	2017–19	Rd. 1	Debut	Hooker	69	9	0	0	36
507.	Edrick Lee	(Australia)	2017–18	Rd. 1	Canberra Raiders	Wing	24	14	1	0	58
508.	Jeremy Latimore	(Australia)	2017	Rd. 2	Penrith Panthers	Prop	19	0	0	0	0
509.	James Segeyaro	(Australia) (Papua New Guinea)	2017–18	Rd. 4	Leeds Rhinos	Hooker	38	2	0	0	8
510.	Tony Williams	(Australia) (Tonga)	2017	Rd. 9	Canterbury-Bankstown Bulldogs	Second-row	1	1	0	0	4
511.	Daniel Mortimer	(Australia)	2017	Rd. 15	Gold Coast Titans	Hooker	2	0	0	0	0
512.	Adam Clydsdale	(Australia)	2017	Rd. 21	Canberra Raiders	Hooker	2	0	0	0	0
513.	Jesse Ramien	(Australia)	2017–18, 2020–	Rd. 26	Debut	Centre	167	60	0	0	240
514.	Josh Dugan	(Australia)	2018–21	Rd. 1	St. George Illawarra Dragons	Centre	61	24	0	0	96
515.	Sione Katoa	(New Zealand) (Tonga)	2018	Rd. 1	Debut	Wing	148	102	1	0	410
516.	Matt Moylan	(Australia)	2018–23	Rd. 1	Penrith Panthers	Five-eighth	101	11	2	1	53
517.	Ava Seumanufagai	(New Zealand)	2018	Rd. 1	Wests Tigers	Prop	13	0	0	0	0
518.	Aaron Gray	(Australia)	2018–19	Rd. 2	South Sydney Rabbitohs	Wing	7	5	0	0	20
519.	Trent Hodkinson	(Australia)	2018	Rd. 3	Newcastle Knights	Five-eighth	4	0	0	0	0
520.	Kurt Dillon	(Australia)	2018	Rd. 6	Debut	Prop	4	0	0	0	0
521.	Braden Uele	(New Zealand)	2018–26	Rd. 10	North Queensland Cowboys	Prop	135	17	0	0	68
522.	Jack Williams	(New Zealand)	2018–24	Rd. 10	Debut	Lock	124	11	0	0	44
523.	Aaron Woods	(Australia)	2018–21	Rd. 16	Canterbury-Bankstown Bulldogs	Prop	73	6	0	0	24
524.	Kyle Flanagan	(Australia)	2018–19	Rd. 24	Debut	Five-eighth	9	1	19	0	42
525.	Blayke Brailey	(Australia)	2019–	Rd. 1	Debut	Hooker	185	21	0	0	84
526.	Shaun Johnson	(New Zealand)	2019–21	Rd. 1	New Zealand Warriors	Halfback	44	6	119	1	263
527.	Josh Morris	(Australia)	2019–20	Rd. 1	Canterbury-Bankstown Bulldogs	Centre	25	15	0	0	60
528.	Briton Nikora	(New Zealand)	2019–	Rd. 1	Debut	Second-row	180	53	0	0	212
529.	Bronson Xerri	(Australia)	2019	Rd. 4	Debut	Centre	22	13	0	0	52
530.	William Kennedy	(Australia)	2019–	Rd. 6	Debut	Fullback	160	62	0	0	248
531.	Ronaldo Mulitalo	(New Zealand) (Samoa) (United States)	2019–	Rd. 7	Debut	Wing	153	113	0	0	452
532.	Billy Magoulias	(Australia) (Greece)	2019–21	Rd. 19	Debut	Lock	17	1	0	0	4
533.	Toby Rudolf	(Australia)	2020–	Rd. 1	Debut	Prop	133	6	0	0	24
534.	Connor Tracey	(Australia)	2020–23	Rd. 1	South Sydney Rabbitohs	Centre	64	27	0	0	108
535.	Siosifa Talakai	(Australia)	2020–26	Rd. 4	South Sydney Rabbitohs	Second-row, Centre	145	31	1	0	126
536.	Mawene Hiroti	(New Zealand)	2020–26	Rd. 5	South Sydney Rabbitohs	Wing	41	15	5	0	70
537.	Royce Hunt	(New Zealand)	2020–24	Rd. 6	Canberra Raiders	Prop	75	8	0	0	32
538.	Nene Macdonald	(Papua New Guinea)	2020	Rd. 9	North Queensland Cowboys	Wing	2	1	0	0	4
539.	Teig Wilton	(Australia)	2020–	Rd. 11	Debut	Second-row	129	31	0	0	124
540.	Jackson Ferris	(New Zealand)	2020	Rd. 12	Debut	Centre	1	1	0	0	4
541.	Braydon Trindall	(Australia)	2020–	Rd. 12	Debut	Five-eighth	120	37	98	4	349
542.	Daniel Vasquez	(Australia)	2020	Rd. 20	Debut	Prop	1	0	0	0	0
543.	Aiden Tolman	(Australia)	2021–22	Rd. 1	Canterbury Bulldogs	Prop	43	2	0	0	8
544.	Will Chambers	(Australia)	2021	Rd. 8	Melbourne Storm	Centre	9	1	0	0	4
545.	Franklin Pele	(New Zealand)	2021	Rd. 12	Debut	Prop	1	0	0	0	0
546.	Luke Metcalf	(Australia)	2021–22	Rd. 20	Debut	Five-eighth	7	2	0	0	8
547.	Dale Finucane	(Australia)	2022–24	Rd. 1	Melbourne Storm	Lock	33	0	0	0	0
548.	Nicho Hynes	(Australia)	2022–	Rd. 1	Melbourne Storm	Halfback	113	29	418	6	958
549.	Matt Ikuvalu	(Australia)	2022–23	Rd. 1	Sydney Roosters	Wing	5	4	0	0	16
550.	Cameron McInnes	(Australia)	2022–26	Rd. 2	St. George Illawarra Dragons	Lock	115	11	0	0	44
551.	Lachie Miller	(Australia)	2022–23	Rd. 11	Debut	Fullback	7	3	0	0	12
552.	Thomas Hazelton	(Australia)	2022–	Rd. 12	Debut	Prop	81	13	0	0	52
553.	Jesse Colquhoun	(Australia)	2022–	Rd. 18	Debut	Prop	52	4	0	0	16
554.	Kade Dykes	(Australia)	2022	Rd. 21	Debut	Fullback	2	1	0	0	4
555.	KL Iro	(New Zealand) (Cook Islands)	2022, 2024–	Rd. 24	Debut	Centre	61	30	0	0	120
556.	Oregon Kaufusi	(Australia) (Samoa)	2023–	Rd. 1	Parramatta Eels	Prop	88	4	0	0	16
557.	Daniel Atkinson	(Australia) (Italy)	2023–25	Rd. 15	Melbourne Storm	Halfback	36	8	14	2	62
558.	Tuku Hau Tapuha	(New Zealand)	2024–	Rd. 2	Sydney Roosters	Prop	19	2	0	0	8
559.	Billy Burns	(Australia)	2024–	Rd. 3	St. George Illawarra Dragons	Second-row	47	10	0	0	40
560.	Samuel Stonestreet	(Australia)	2024–	Rd. 7	Debut	Wing	28	20	0	0	80
561.	Jayden Berrell	(Australia)	2024, 2026	Rd. 21	Debut	Hooker	7	0	0	0	0
562.	Liam Ison	(Australia)	2024, 2026–	Rd. 21	Debut	Fullback	1	0	0	0	0
563.	Addin Fonua-Blake	(New Zealand) (Tonga)	2025–	Rd. 1	New Zealand Warriors	Prop	50	8	0	0	32
564.	Hohepa Puru	(Australia)	2025–	Rd. 16	Canberra Raiders	Lock	17	1	0	0	4
565.	Chris Vea'ila	(New Zealand)	2025	Rd. 20	Debut	Centre	2	1	0	0	4
566.	Niwhai Puru	(Australia)	2026	Rd. 13	Debut	Halfback	7	1	4	0	12
567.	Riley Jones	(Australia)	2026–	Rd. 27	Newcastle Knights	Centre	2	1	0	0	4
568.	Michael Gabrael	(Australia)	2026–	Rd. 27	Debut	Centre	1	0	0	0	0
569.	Riley Pollard	(Australia)	2026–	Rd. 27	Debut	Five-eighth	1	0	0	0	0
