= 2007 Cronulla-Sutherland Sharks season =

- NRL rank: 11th
- 2007 record: Wins: 10; draws: 0; losses: 14
- Points scored: For: 463 (77 tries, 77 goals, 1 field goal); against: 403 (71 tries, 57 goals, 5 field goals)

Team information
- Coach: Ricky Stuart
- Captain: Brett Kimmorley Paul Gallen
- Stadium: Toyota Stadium
- Avg. attendance: 10,689

Top scorers
- Tries: Ben Pomeroy (12)
- Goals: Luke Covell (68)
- Points: Luke Covell (176)
← 2006	2008 →

The 2007 Cronulla-Sutherland Sharks season was the 41st in the club's history. They competed in the National Rugby League's 2007 Telstra Premiership and finished 11th (out of 16).

== Season summary ==
The Sharks began the 2007 season afresh following Stuart Raper's dismissal from the club following its poor 2006 season. The Sharks signed former Brisbane Broncos bad boy Brett Seymour who was sacked by that club last year.

2007 was a season of near misses for the largely inexperienced Sharks side with a large number of games lost by 4 points or less. This was highlighted with their points difference of +60; if any of those narrow losses had been won, they would have finished in the top eight, even the top four. Notable wins included a first round shutout of the 2003 premiers Penrith 18–0 (indeed, Penrith went on to win the wooden spoon), a round nine win over the struggling premiers Brisbane at home which pitted NSW hopeful Greg Bird against Queensland captain Darren Lockyer, a golden point win over the Parramatta Eels at Parramatta, the venue of their infamous 74–4 loss just four years earlier and finally a 22–12 win over the Canberra Raiders in Canberra.

== Ladder ==
2007 NRL season
Pos	Team	Pld	W	D	L	B	PF	PA	PD	Pts
1	Melbourne Storm	24	21	0	3	1	627	277	+350	44
2	Manly-Warringah Sea Eagles	24	18	0	6	1	597	377	+220	38
3	North Queensland Cowboys	24	15	0	9	1	547	618	−71	32
4	New Zealand Warriors	24	13	1	10	1	593	434	+159	29
5	Parramatta Eels	24	13	0	11	1	573	481	+92	28
6	Canterbury-Bankstown Bulldogs	24	12	0	12	1	575	528	+47	26
7	South Sydney Rabbitohs	24	12	0	12	1	408	399	+9	26
8	Brisbane Broncos	24	11	0	13	1	511	476	+35	24
9	Wests Tigers	24	11	0	13	1	541	561	−20	24
10	Sydney Roosters	24	10	1	13	1	445	610	−165	23
11	Cronulla-Sutherland Sharks	24	10	0	14	1	463	403	+60	22
12	Gold Coast Titans	24	10	0	14	1	409	559	−150	22
13	St George Illawarra Dragons	24	9	0	15	1	431	509	−78	20
14	Canberra Raiders	24	9	0	15	1	522	652	−130	20
15	Newcastle Knights	24	9	0	15	1	418	708	−290	20
16	Penrith Panthers	24	8	0	16	1	539	607	−68	18

== Players ==
Current to Round 19, 2007
Player	Appearances	Tries	Goals	F Goals	Points
Isaac De Gois	24	8	0	0	32
Craig Stapleton	24	0	0	0	0
Luke Douglas	24	0	0	0	0
Ben Pomeroy	23	12	0	0	48
Luke Covell	23	10	68	0	176
Reece Williams	23	4	0	0	16
Kevin Kingston	22	1	0	0	4
Greg Bird	20	9	2	0	40
Paul Gallen	19	2	0	0	8
Fraser Anderson	18	6	0	0	24
Ben Ross	18	0	0	0	0
David Simmons	18	9	0	0	36
Lance Thompson	14	0	0	0	0
Adam Dykes	13	1	0	0	4
Brett Kimmorley	13	0	0	0	0
Mitch Brown	13	4	0	0	16
Jacob Selmes	10	0	0	0	0
Phillip Leuluai	10	1	0	0	4
Dayne Weston	10	0	0	0	0
Brett Seymour	10	0	7	1	15
Misi Taulapapa	9	2	0	0	8
Henry Perenara	9	2	0	0	8
Brett Kearney	8	5	0	0	20
Cameron Ciraldo	7	0	0	0	0
Eddie Sua	6	0	0	0	0
Paul Stephenson	6	1	0	0	4
Anthony Watts	5	0	0	0	0
Josh Hannay	3	0	0	0	0
Bryson Goodwin	2	0	0	0	0
Dane Nielson	1	0	0	0	0
Dustin Cooper	1	0	0	0	0

== Club Awards ==
- Player of the year- Paul Gallen
- Chairman's Award - Luke Covell
- Rookie of the Year - Jacob Selmes
- Clubman of the Year - Tony Bagnall
- Premier League Player of the Year - Luke Sant
- Premier League Coaches Award - Paul Stephenson
- Jersey Flegg Players Award - Daniel Sayegh
- Jersey Flegg Coaches Award - Jason Fletcher

== Player movements ==
Gains

2007 Signings/Transfers
Player	Previous club	Years signed	Until the end of

Losses

Losses
Player	Notes

Re-Signings

Re-Signings
