= Mick Mullane =

Mick Mullane may refer to:

- Mick Mullane Jr. (born 1955), Australian rugby league player
- Mick Mullane Sr. (1924–2008), his father, Australian rugby league player
- Mick Mullane (hurler), Irish hurler

== See also ==
- Mike Mullane, American engineer and astronaut
