= Trent Grubb =

Australian rugby league footballer

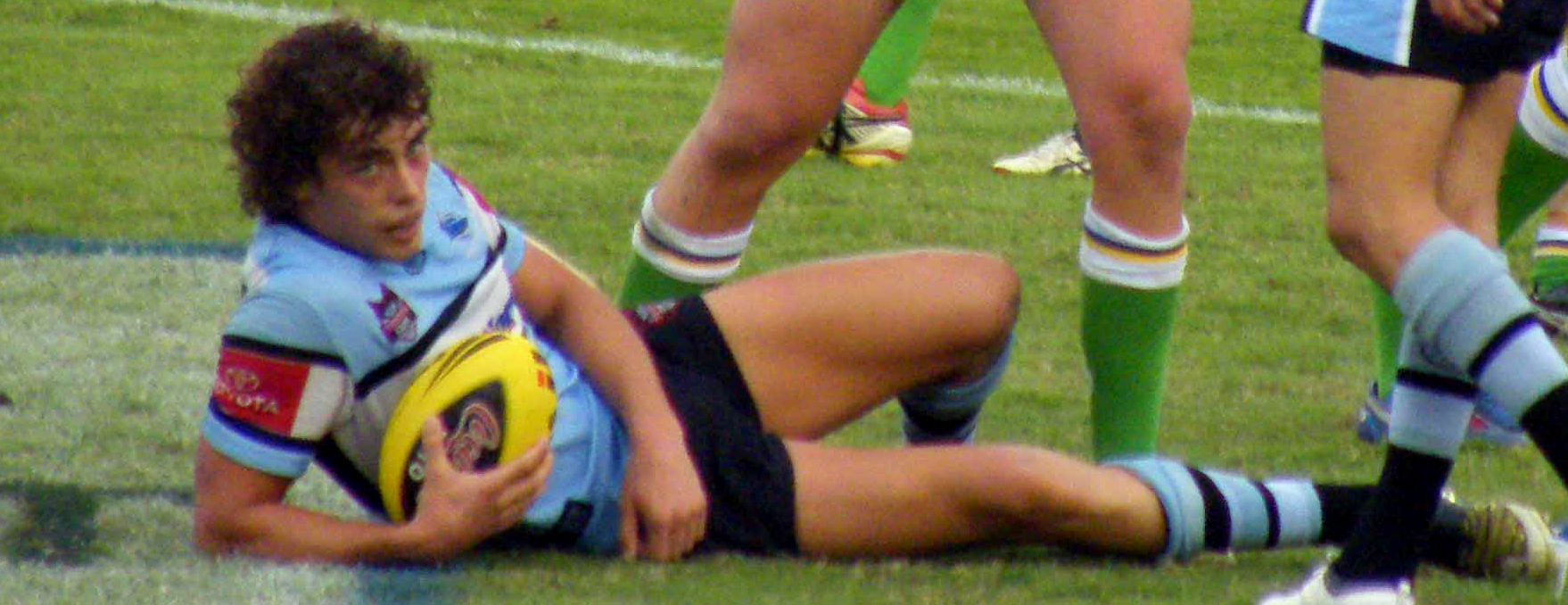

Personal information
- Born: 22 March 1989 (age 35)
- Height: 190 cm (6 ft 3 in)
- Weight: 99 kg (15 st 8 lb)

Playing information
- Position: Second-row
Club
Years	Team	Pld	T	G	FG	P
2010	Cronulla Sharks	1	0	0	0	0

Trent Grubb (born 22 March 1989) is a rugby league footballer who played for Cronulla-Sutherland Sharks in the National Rugby League. His choice of position is second row.
