= Jye Mullane =

Australian rugby league & union footballer (born 1981)

Personal information
- Born: 29 July 1981 (age 45) Sutherland, New South Wales, Australia

Playing information

Rugby league
- Position: Five-eighth, Halfback
Club
Years	Team	Pld	T	G	FG	P
2002–03	Cronulla Sharks	13	3	0	0	12
2004	Manly Sea Eagles	12	3	0	0	12
2008–12	Lézignan Sangliers	60	40	130	5	0
	Total	85	46	130	5	24

Rugby union
Club
Years	Team	Pld	T	G	FG	P
2005	NSW Waratahs	4	0	0	0	0
2006	Southern Districts Rebels	0	0	0	0	0
2007	Northern Suburbs	0	0	0	0	0
2007	Central Coast Rays	11	5	0	0	0
2008–13	Beziers	37	9	0	0	0
	Total	52	14	0	0	0
- Father: Mick Mullane Jr.
- Relatives: Greg Mullane (uncle); Mick Mullane Sr. (great uncle)

Jye Mullane (born 29 July 1981) is an Australian former professional rugby league footballer who played for the Cronulla-Sutherland Sharks and Manly-Warringah Sea Eagles.

In 2005 he signed with NSW Waratahs Australian Rugby Union and played domestically for Southern Districts Rebels (2006) and Northern Suburbs (2007). At this time the Australian Rugby Championship (ARC) was established nationally. Jye represented the Central Coast Rays in successfully taking out the maiden premiership. From this Jye relocated to France debuting with the successful Lézignan Sangliers 2007 premiership winning team before signing on with Béziers rugby ProD2 competition.

Mullane went onto play six seasons in France spanning both rugby league and rugby union before returning to Australia to assist his local junior club De La Salle win an A grade Final in 2013

== Playing career ==
Mullane debuted in 2002, as a 21-year-old and played a total of 30 first grade matches spanning four years. He switched codes in 2007, playing at Northern Suburbs club rugby, Central Coast Rays (now defunct APC) before signing a one-year deal with NSW Waratahs.

In 2008, he left for France, playing for Lezignan Corbieres where he helped win their first premiership in 30 years. Joining Béziers (ASBH) rugby France in the Pro D2 in 2008. Since returning to rugby league for Lezignan 2009, he helped them remain the champions of the French Elite competition for four years in a row with two French cup titles.
