= Mick Mullane (hurler) =

Irish hurler

Personal information
- Native name: Mícheál Ó Maoláin (Irish)
- Born: 13 April 1889 Croom, County Limerick, Ireland
- Died: 22 November 1962 (aged 73) Patrickswell, County Limerick, Ireland
- Occupation: Farmer
- Height: 6 ft 2 in (188 cm)

Sport
- Sport: Hurling
- Position: Left wing-forward
Club
- Years: Club
- Croom
Club titles
- Limerick titles: 2
Inter-county
- Years: County
- Limerick
Inter-county titles
- Munster titles: 1
- All-Irelands: 1

Michael Mullane (13 April 1889 – 22 November 1962) was an Irish hurler who played as a left wing-forward for the Limerick senior team.

Born in Croom, County Limerick, Mullane first arrived on the inter-county scene at the age of thirty when he first linked up with the Limerick senior team. Mullane went on to play a key part for Limerick during a golden age for the team, and won one All-Ireland medal and one Munster medal.

At club level Mullane won two championship medals with Croom.

== Honours ==
=== Team ===
Young Irelands

- Limerick Senior Hurling Championship (2): 1919, 1924

Limerick

- All-Ireland Senior Hurling Championship (1): 1921
- Munster Senior Hurling Championship (1): 1921
