= Mick Mullane Sr. =

Australian rugby league footballer

Mick Mullane
Personal information
- Full name: Maurice James Mullane
- Born: 23 May 1924; Camperdown, New South Wales, Australia
- Died: 13 April 2008 (aged 83); Sydney, Australia

Playing information
- Position: Centre
Club
Years	Team	Pld	T	G	FG	P
1947–50	Newtown	44	17	0	0	51
1951–53	St. George	12	3	1	0	11
	Total	56	20	1	0	62
Representative
Years	Team	Pld	T	G	FG	P
1950	New South Wales	1	0	0	0	0
- Relatives: Greg Mullane (son); Mick Mullane Jr. (son); Jye Mullane (grandson)

Maurice James Mullane (1924–2008) was an Australian rugby league footballer who played in the 1940s and 1950s.

== Playing career ==
'Mick' Mullane started his career at Newtown just after he returned from war service. He played four years of first grade with the Bluebags and represented N.S.W. in 1950. He moved to the St. George club in 1951, but suffered a season ending leg injury in a trial game. The turned out for the Saints the following year before retiring at the conclusion of the 1953 season.

'Mick' Mullane was the father of Mick Mullane Jr. and Greg Mullane, both first grade rugby league players in the 1970s.

== Death ==
Maurice James 'Mick' Mullane died in Sydney on 13 April 2008, 40 days short of his 84th birthday.
