= Don Tweddle =

Australian rugby league player (born 1979)

Personal information
- Full name: Don Tweddle Jr.
- Born: 7 September 1979 (age 45); Wollongong, New South Wales, Australia
- Height: 195 cm (6 ft 5 in)
- Weight: 128 kg (20 st 2 lb)

Playing information
- Position: Prop
Club
Years	Team	Pld	T	G	FG	P
2003	Cronulla Sharks	5	0	0	0	0

Don Tweddle Jr. (born 7 September 1979), also known by the nickname of "Twedds", is an Australian former rugby league footballer who played in the 2000s. He played for the Cronulla-Sutherland Sharks. His position of choice was prop.

== Background ==
Tweddle was born in Wollongong, New South Wales, Australia. He went to Corrimal Public School and Corrimal High School. He is the son of former Corrimal Cougars player and administrator Don Tweddle Sr.

It was rumoured that as a young boy he developed a fear of the dark, a phobia he carried into adulthood.

== Playing career ==
Tweddle's talent was quickly noticed and while still an adolescent was signed to a junior development deal with Australian Rugby League club the Illawarra Steelers. At the completion of the 1998 season the Illawarra club was forced to form a joint venture with the St. George Dragons and Tweddle's contract was not renewed with the newly formed entity, the St. George Illawarra Dragons.

After 3 seasons of playing for Corrimal Cougars in the Illawarra competition, Tweddle joined the Cronulla-Sutherland Sharks in 2002. After a full season in the lower grades, he made his first grade debut from the bench in his side's 36−32 loss to the Melbourne Storm at Endeavour Field in round 1 of the 2003 season. He played only four more games of first grade, the last of which was in his side's 44−12 loss to the Wests Tigers at the Leichhardt Oval in round 18 of the 2003 season. Tweddle was released by the Sharks at the end of the 2003 season, and subsequently never played first grade rugby league again.
