= Bill Annabel =

Australian rugby league player

Personal information
- Born: 1 September 1948 (age 77)

Playing information
- Position: Prop
Club
Years	Team	Pld	T	G	FG	P
1976–78	South Sydney	36	1	0	0	3
1979	Cronulla-Sutherland	8	0	0	0	0
	Total	44	1	0	0	3

Bill Annabel (born 1 September 1948) is an Australian former professional rugby league footballer. He played four seasons in the New South Wales Rugby League Premiership in the 1970s, playing the majority of his career at the South Sydney Rabbitohs before making a brief stint in his final season with the Cronulla-Sutherland Sharks.

== Playing career ==
Annabel made his rugby league debut for Souths in Round 2 of the 1976 season at the unusually old age of 27. Starting at the front-row (prop), his side lost 21-4 at the hands of the Parramatta Eels. 16 rounds later, he recorded the first try of his career in a win against the Newtown Jets. This ended up being the only try of his career. Annabel concluded the season with 1 try in 16 appearances and Souths failed to qualify for the finals having finished the season 10th out of 12 teams.

Annabel made 18 appearances in 1977 (all at front-row). South Sydney had an unsuccessful season, finishing 11th with only 3 wins. This was the polar opposite of the club's performances earlier in the decade (which culminated in two straight premiership wins in 1970 and 1971). Annabel only played in one win that season - Round 4 against the Penrith Panthers.

In 1978, he played his final season with South Sydney, only playing 2 games that year. This time, Souths had a far better season, only 1 win and 1 draw away from reaching the top 5 and playing finals football. Annabel was relegated to the bench and played his final game for Souths in Round 8 against the Manly-Warringah Sea Eagles. Souths won that game by a large margin, 30-5.

Annabel signed with the Sharks the following season. He made his debut with the side in Round 5 in a win over the Western Suburbs Magpies. He made 6 more appearances with 3rd place Cronulla, before playing in the Minor Semi Finals at the regular season's end. His side however, lost to the Eels and Annabel never played a game of professional rugby league again.

He finished his career with 44 appearances and 1 try (3 points).
