= Greg Mullane =

Australian rugby league footballer

Personal information
- Full name: Gregory Paul Mullane
- Born: 18 September 1953 (age 73)

Playing information
- Position: Centre
Club
| Years | Team | Pld | T | G | FG | P |
|---|---|---|---|---|---|---|
| 1975–76 | Cronulla-Sutherland | 22 | 10 | 0 | 0 | 30 |
| 1977–78 | Canterbury-Bankstown | 21 | 3 | 0 | 0 | 9 |
| 1979–83 | Cronulla-Sutherland | 71 | 23 | 0 | 0 | 74 |
| 1984–86 | Canterbury-Bankstown | 25 | 3 | 0 | 0 | 12 |
| | Total | 139 | 39 | 0 | 0 | 125 |
- Father: Mick Mullane Sr.
- Relatives: Mick Mullane Jr. (brother); Jye Mullane (nephew)

Greg Mullane (born 18 September 1953) is an Australian former professional rugby league footballer who played in the 1970s and 1980s. He played in New South Wales Rugby League premiership competition.

Mullane played for Cronulla in 1975 and 1976, before leaving to join Canterbury-Bankstown in 1977, feeling Cronulla was not a premiership chance. He said, "They weren't buying anyone while other clubs were. I couldn't see much of a future there. I wanted to play with a team that had a chance of winning a premiership. Mullane was absent when Cronulla made the grand final in 1978 but returned for the 1979, 1981, 1982 and 1983 seasons. Mullane played for Canterbury-Bankstown in the 1984, 1985 and 1986 seasons.

Greg Mullane is the uncle of rugby league and rugby union footballer Jye Mullane. His father, Mick Mullane Sr. was also a rugby league player from the 1940s and 1950s.
