= Stuart Pierce =

Personal information
- Born: 24 July 1972 (age 52)

Playing information
- Position: Prop, Second-row
Club
Years	Team	Pld	T	G	FG	P
1997–01	Cronulla Sharks	10	0	0	0	0

Stuart Pierce (born 24 July 1972) is an Australian former professional rugby league footballer who played for the Cronulla Sharks in the NRL.

== Playing career ==
Pierce was a Cronulla junior. He was a forward recruited locally from De La Salle College, Cronulla. He joined the Cronulla Sharks in the 1996 season, and made his first grade debut for Cronulla in his side's 13−12 win over the Bulldogs at Belmore Sports Ground in round 2 of the 1997 Super League season. Pierce played 5 games in his debut season, and was not included in the Sharks' side that lost to the Brisbane Broncos in the 1997 Super League grand final.

Injuries would limit Pierce to only 5 more first grade appearances during his remaining 4 seasons at the Sharks. His final first grade appearance came in his side's 36−6 loss to the Parramatta Eels at Endeavour Field in round 15 of the 2001 season. He was released by the Sharks at the end of the 2001 season and subsequently retired from playing.
