= Mark Capelin =

Australian rugby league footballer

Personal information
- Born: 2 July 1978 (age 47)
- Height: 178 cm (5 ft 10 in)
- Weight: 87 kg (13 st 10 lb)

Playing information
- Position: Hooker
Club
Years	Team	Pld	T	G	FG	P
2001	Cronulla Sharks	2	0	0	0	0

Mark Capelin (born 2 July 1978) is an Australian former professional rugby league footballer who played for the Cronulla-Sutherland Sharks in the NRL.

== Playing career ==
Capelin, a local junior out of De La Salle, came through the ranks at the Cronulla club from the Under 19s.

A forward, he made two first-grade appearances in the 2001 NRL season. His debut came in round 9 against the Newcastle Knights, which he started as the Sharks' hooker. His only other first grade appearance came the following round when he featured off the bench against the New Zealand Warriors. He was released by the Cronulla outfit at the end of the 2001 season and never played first grade rugby league again Since retirement, he became the owner of Tribe Social Fitness in Taren Point.
