= Dinny O'Bryan =

Australian rugby league footballer

Personal information
- Full name: Dennis O'Bryan
- Born: 1942 (age 83–84)

Playing information
- Position: Halfback
Club
Years	Team	Pld	T	G	FG	P
1962	St. George	16	4	0	0	12
1963–67	North Sydney	64	18	1	1	58
1969	Cronulla-Sutherland	3	0	0	1	2
	Total	83	22	1	2	72

Dinny O'Bryan is an Australian former rugby league footballer who played in the 1960s. He played for the St. George, North Sydney and Cronulla-Sutherland in the New South Wales Rugby League (NSWRL) competition.

== Playing career ==
O'Bryan made his first grade debut for St. George in 1962. O'Bryan made 16 appearances for the club as they won the minor premiership. O'Bryan did not play in the club's grand final victory over Western Suburbs.

In 1963, O'Bryan joined North Sydney. The following season, Norths finished in fourth place on the table and reached the finals for the first time in many years. O'Bryan played in the club's semi final loss against Balmain. In 1965, Norths had one of their best seasons on the field finishing second. O'Bryan however missed both of the club's finals matches through injury.

In the coming seasons, Norths were unable to match their form of the 1965 season and O'Bryan left the club at the end of 1968. O'Bryan then joined the newly formed Cronulla side which had only entered the competition two years prior. O'Bryan only played 3 times for Cronulla in a season where the club finished last on the table and claimed the wooden spoon. O'Bryan's final game for Cronulla came against Eastern Suburbs in round 4 1969 in which O'Bryan kicked a field goal although Easts ran out winners 29–19 at Endeavour Field.
