= Brett Sargent =

Australian rugby league player

Personal information
- Full name: Brett Thomas Sargent
- Born: 30 March 1981 (age 43); Sydney, New South Wales, Australia
- Height: 187 cm (6 ft 2 in)
- Weight: 108 kg (17 st 0 lb)

Playing information
- Position: Second-row
Club
Years	Team	Pld	T	G	FG	P
2002	Cronulla Sharks	3	0	0	0	0

Brett Sargent (born 30 March 1981), also known by the nickname of "Sarge", is an Australian former rugby league footballer who played in the 2000s. He played for the Cronulla-Sutherland Sharks. His position of choice was second-row.

== Playing career ==
Sargent was an Australian Schoolboys representative in 1999. Sargent was a Parramatta junior. He joined the Cronulla-Sutherland Sharks in the 2001 season. He made his first grade debut from the bench in his side's 46−24 victory over the Northern Eagles at Brookvale Oval in round 19 of the 2002 season. He played only two more games of first grade, the last of which was in his side's 34−20 victory over the Sydney Roosters at the Sydney Football Stadium in round 21 of the 2002 season. Sargent was released by the Sharks at the end of the 2003 season, and subsequently never played first grade rugby league again.

After his departure from the Cronulla club, Sargent went on to play for the Wentworthville Magpies in the New South Wales Cup competition and CYMS Orange in the Group 10 competition.
