= Guy Picken =

Australian rugby league footballer

Personal information
- Full name: Guy Picken
- Born: 17 July 1965 (age 61)

Playing information
- Position: Prop, Hooker
Club
Years	Team	Pld	T	G	FG	P
1986–89	Cronulla-Sutherland	24	0	0	0	0
1991–92	St. George Dragons	15	1	0	0	4
	Total	39	1	0	0	4
- Source: As of 9 February 2023

Guy Picken is an Australian former professional rugby league footballer who played in the 1980s and 1990s. He played for St. George and Cronulla-Sutherland in the New South Wales Rugby League (NSWRL) competition.

== Playing career ==
Picken made his first grade debut for Cronulla in round 20 of the 1986 NSWRL season against fierce rivals St. George at the Sydney Cricket Ground. In 1988, Picken played five games for Cronulla as they claimed the Minor Premiership. It was not until 1989 when Picken became a regular in the Cronulla side. He played 15 games that season including their minor preliminary semi-final loss to eventual premiers Canberra. In 1991, Picken signed for St. George where he played 15 games over two seasons.
