= Malcolm Wheeler =

Australian rugby league footballer

Personal information
- Full name: Malcolm Wheeler
- Born: 30 January 1964 (age 62) Dubbo, New South Wales, Australia

Playing information
- Position: Prop
Club
Years	Team	Pld	T	G	FG	P
1986–91	Cronulla Sharks	31	2	0	0	8
1992	Western Suburbs	2	0	0	0	0
	Total	33	2	0	0	8
- Source: As of 22 December 2022

Malcolm Wheeler is an Australian former professional rugby league footballer who played in the 1980s and 1990s. He played for Western Suburbs and the Cronulla-Sutherland Sharks in the NSWRL competition.

== Playing career ==
Wheeler made his first grade debut for Cronulla in round 7 of the 1986 NSWRL season against arch-rivals St. George at Shark Park. In 1988, Wheeler played 13 games as Cronulla claimed the Minor Premiership. Wheeler played in both finals matches as the club were eliminated in straight sets. After three more seasons at Cronulla, Wheeler signed for Western Suburbs but played only two matches for the club.
