= Charlie Saab =

Australian rugby league footballer

Personal information
- Full name: Charlie Saab
- Born: 14 February 1969 (age 56) Assoun, Lebanon

Playing information
- Position: Centre, Fullback, Lock, Five-eighth
Club
Years	Team	Pld	T	G	FG	P
1988–91	South Sydney	32	5	56	0	132
1992	Cronulla Sharks	5	2	0	0	8
1993	Western Suburbs	1	1	0	0	4
	Total	38	8	56	0	144

Charlie Saab is an Australian former rugby league footballer who played in the 1980s and 1990s. He played for South Sydney, Cronulla-Sutherland and Western Suburbs in the New South Wales Rugby League (NSWRL) competition.

== Playing career ==
Saab made his first grade debut for South Sydney in round 21 of the 1988 season against the Gold Coast at the Sydney Football Stadium, with the match finishing in a 14–all draw. Saab scored his first try in the top grade the following week against Canterbury-Bankstown in an 18–14 victory at Belmore Oval.

Saab made only four appearances for Souths during the 1989 season, where the club finished as minor premiers. In 1990, Saab had a breakout season, finishing the year as the Rabbitohs’ top point-scorer, although the club had a horror year on the field, finishing last on the table and claiming the wooden spoon. Saab departed Souths at the end of 1991 after the club finished 14th on the table. In total, Saab made 63 appearances for Souths across all grades.

In 1992, Saab joined Cronulla-Sutherland but made only five appearances for the first-grade team, all of which were losses. In 1993, Saab joined Western Suburbs and scored a try on debut against North Sydney in a 22–9 loss at North Sydney Oval. This was Saab's last game in the top grade as a player and he departed Wests at the end of the season.
