= Jim See =

Australian rugby league footballer (born 1960)

Personal information
- Full name: James William See
- Born: October 1960 (age 66) Dubbo, NSW, Australia

Playing information
- Position: Centre, Wing
Club
Years	Team	Pld	T	G	FG	P
1980	Manly Warringah	4	0	0	0	0
1981–87	Cronulla Sharks	68	14	0	0	48
	Total	72	14	0	0	48

James William See (born October 1960) is an Australian former rugby league footballer.

Born and raised in Dubbo, See was educated at Dubbo South High School. He played several sports during his youth, in addition to rugby league, and was a NSW Country long jump champion. His junior rugby league was played with the West Side club and he gained captaincy honours for NSW Schoolboys Under-18s. He also attained Australian Schoolboys selection, but didn't play any fixtures.

See, a centre and winger, moved to Sydney after being scouted to play for reigning premiers Manly in 1979, joining the club on the same day as Paul Vautin. He served his apprenticeship in the Ray Ritchie–coached under-23s and debuted in first–grade during the 1980 NSWRFL season. With opportunities limited, See moved on to Cronulla in 1981 and the following year established a place in first–grade. He had a total of seven first–grade seasons with Cronulla and afterwards served as captain-coach of the Lismore Workers Warriors.
