= Eddie Su'a =

Portugal international rugby league footballer

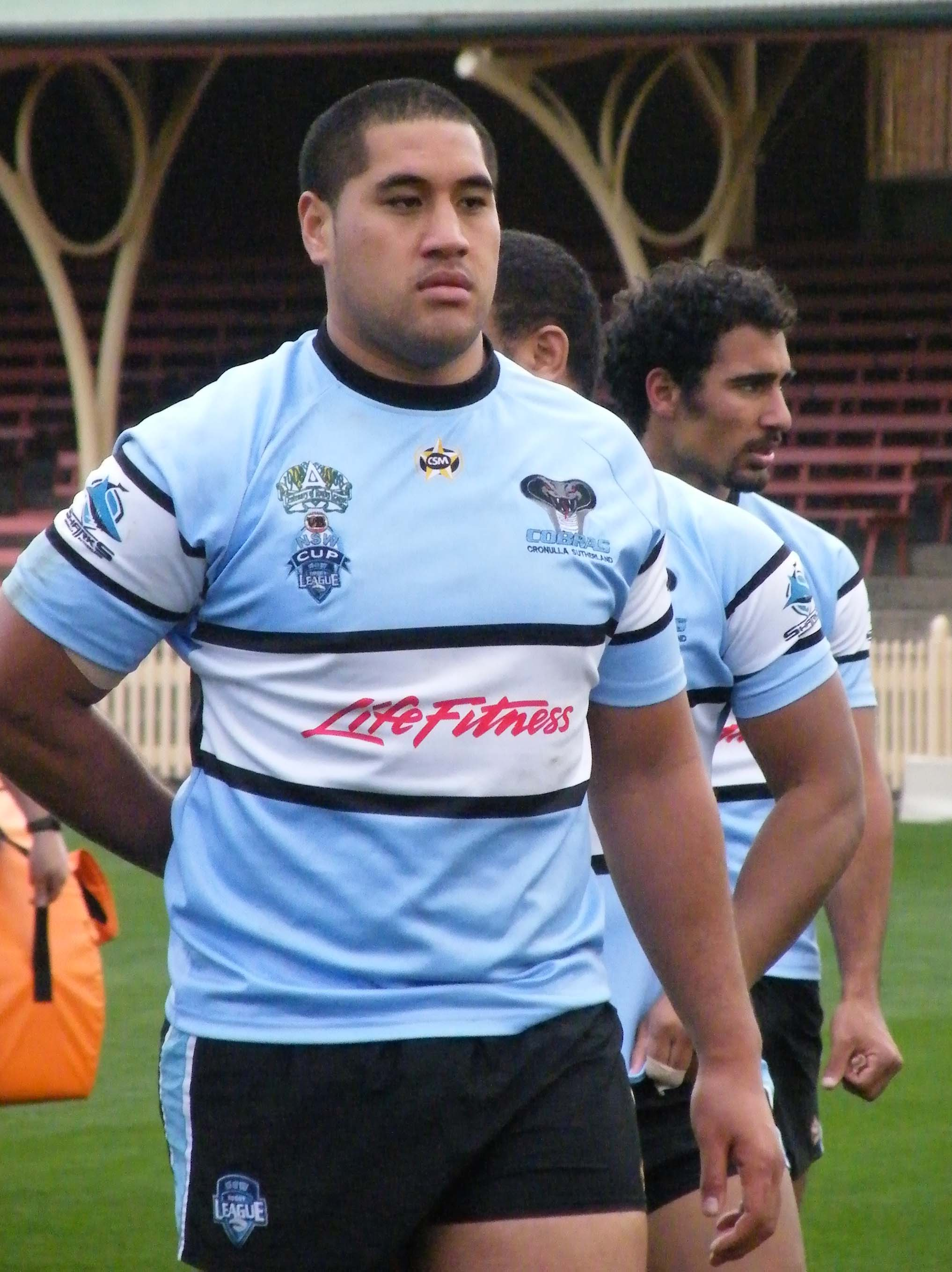
- Su'a playing for the Cronulla Sharks

Personal information
- Full name: Eddie Su'a
- Born: 13 January 1983 (age 43) Apia, Samoa
- Height: 190 cm (6 ft 3 in)
- Weight: 115 kg (18 st 2 lb)

Playing information
- Position: Prop
Club
Years	Team	Pld	T	G	FG	P
2007	Cronulla Sharks	6	0	0	0	0
Representative
Years	Team	Pld	T	G	FG	P
	Portugal
- Source: As of 21 January 2019

Eddie Su'a (born 13 January 1983) is a Portuguese international former rugby league footballer who played in the 2000s. Su'a played for the Cronulla-Sutherland Sharks in the National Rugby League as a prop. He was a Portuguese international.

== Playing career ==
Su'a made his first grade debut for Cronulla in round 19 of the 2007 NRL season against arch-rivals Manly at Shark Park. Su'a played six games for Cronulla, with his final appearance coming against Canberra in round 25 at Bruce Stadium.
