= Jacob Selmes =

Australian rugby league footballer

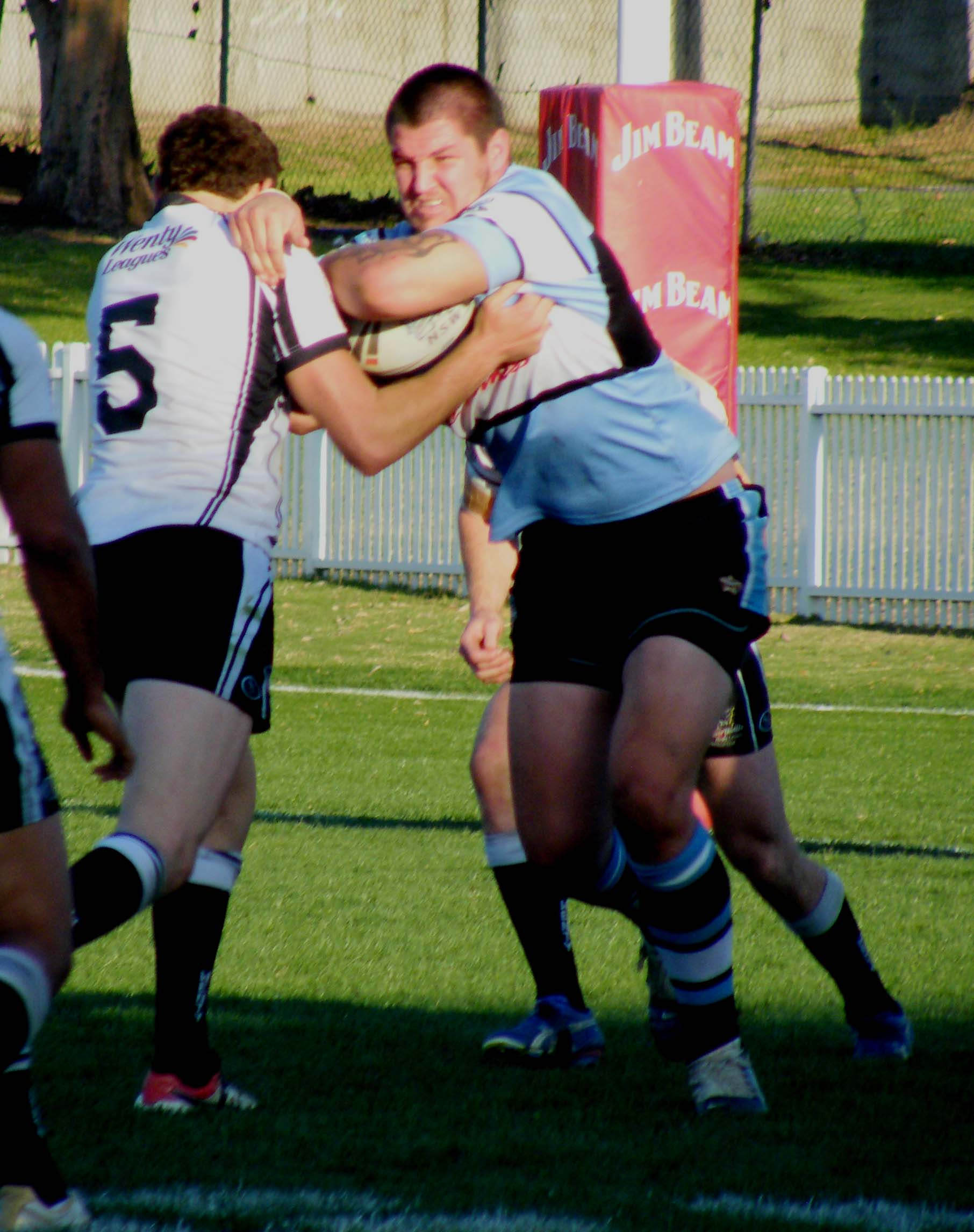

Personal information
- Full name: Jacob Selmes
- Born: 13 February 1986 (age 39); Katoomba, New South Wales, Australia
- Height: 196 cm (6 ft 5 in)
- Weight: 118 kg (18 st 8 lb)

Playing information
- Position: Prop
Club
Years	Team	Pld	T	G	FG	P
2007–09	Cronulla-Sutherland	18	0	0	0	0
- Source: As of 18 January 2019

Jacob Selmes (born 13 February 1986 in Katoomba, New South Wales) is an Australian former professional rugby league footballer who played in the 2000s for the Cronulla-Sutherland Sharks in the National Rugby League competition, as a prop.

== Playing career ==
In the 2006 pre-season, Selmes was involved in an altercation with teammate Hutch Maiava, resulting in Selmes requiring twelve stitches after being punched in the head, as a result, Maiava was suspended until mid-season and fined for his actions.

Selmes made his first grade debut for Cronulla-Sutherland against Penrith on 17 March 2007. Selmes was later awarded the Sharks Rookie of the Year in 2007. Selmes last match in first grade was in Round 15 2009 against Brisbane which Cronulla won 46–12.

== Career highlights ==
- Junior Club: Port Macquarie Sharks
- First Grade Debut: 17 Mar 2007 V Penrith
