= Mick Mullane Jr. =

Australian rugby league footballer

Mick Mullane, Jr.
Personal information
- Born: 9 September 1956 (age 69)

Playing information
- Position: Fullback
Club
Years	Team	Pld	T	G	FG	P
1976–83	Cronulla	123	53	–	–	162
- Father: Mick Mullane Sr.
- Relatives: Jye Mullane (son); Greg Mullane (brother)

Mick Mullane Jr. (born 9 September 1955) is an Australian former professional rugby league footballer, who was a member of the Cronulla-Sutherland Sharks rugby league team. Mullane played fullback, and played in the 1978 grand final.

Mullane is the son of Mick Mullane Sr., who played for Newtown and St. George from 1947 to 1953; the younger brother of Greg Mullane (Canterbury and Cronulla); and the father of Jye Mullane.
