= Paul Stephenson (rugby league) =

Australian rugby league footballer

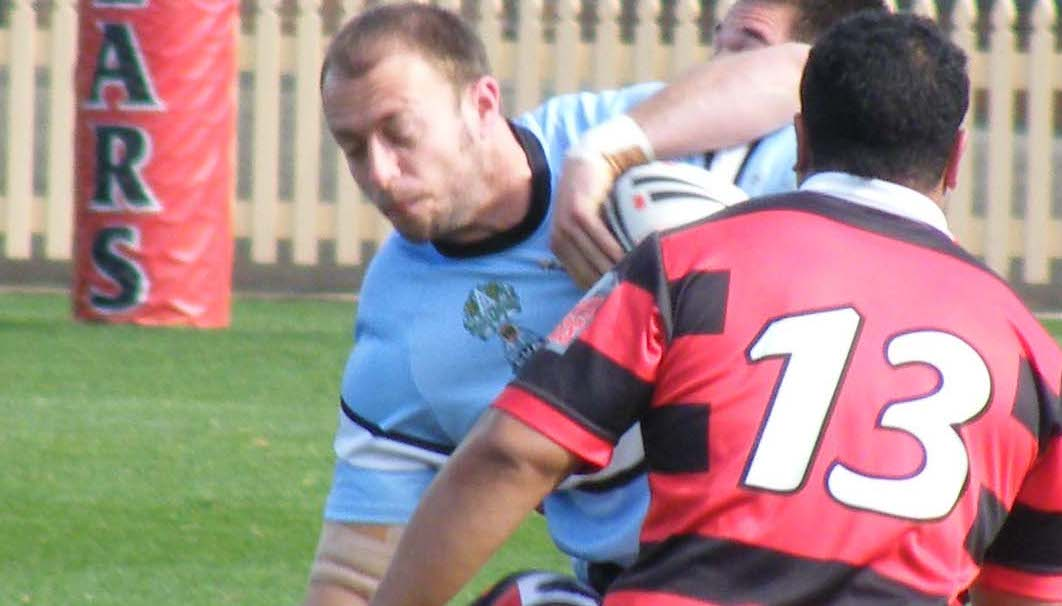

Personal information
- Full name: Paul Stephenson
- Born: 22 September 1983 (age 42) Newcastle, New South Wales, Australia

Playing information
- Height: 189 cm (6 ft 2 in)
- Weight: 100 kg (15 st 10 lb)
- Position: Second-row, Centre, Wing
Club
Years	Team	Pld	T	G	FG	P
2004–06	Manly Sea Eagles	43	17	0	0	68
2007–08	Cronulla Sharks	12	1	0	0	4
	Total	55	18	0	0	72

Paul Stephenson (born 22 September 1983) is an Australian former professional rugby league footballer who played in the 2000s for the Cronulla-Sutherland Sharks and Manly Warringah Sea Eagles in the NRL.

== Background ==
Stephenson was born in Newcastle, New South Wales, Australia.

His son Sam is a professional rugby league player for the Gold Coast Titans, who represented the Australian Schoolboys and Queensland Under-19s in 2024.

== Playing career ==
Stephenson played at centre and made his professional rugby debut with the Manly Warringah Sea Eagles before signing with Cronulla for the 2007 season. Stephenson played well as an interchange forward for the Sharks, winning the club Premier League Coaches Award. Stephenson had represented NSW residents and Qld country.

== Post playing ==
After his professional career finished, Stephenson moved to Brisbane with his family and played 2 seasons with the Ipswich Jets under the guidance of Glenn Lazarus and later with the Tweed Heads Seagulls. In April 2019, Paul became CEO of the Tweed Heads Seagulls RLFC before resigning in March 2020 to take up a newly created position with Queensland Rugby League.
