= Reece Williams =

Australian rugby league footballer

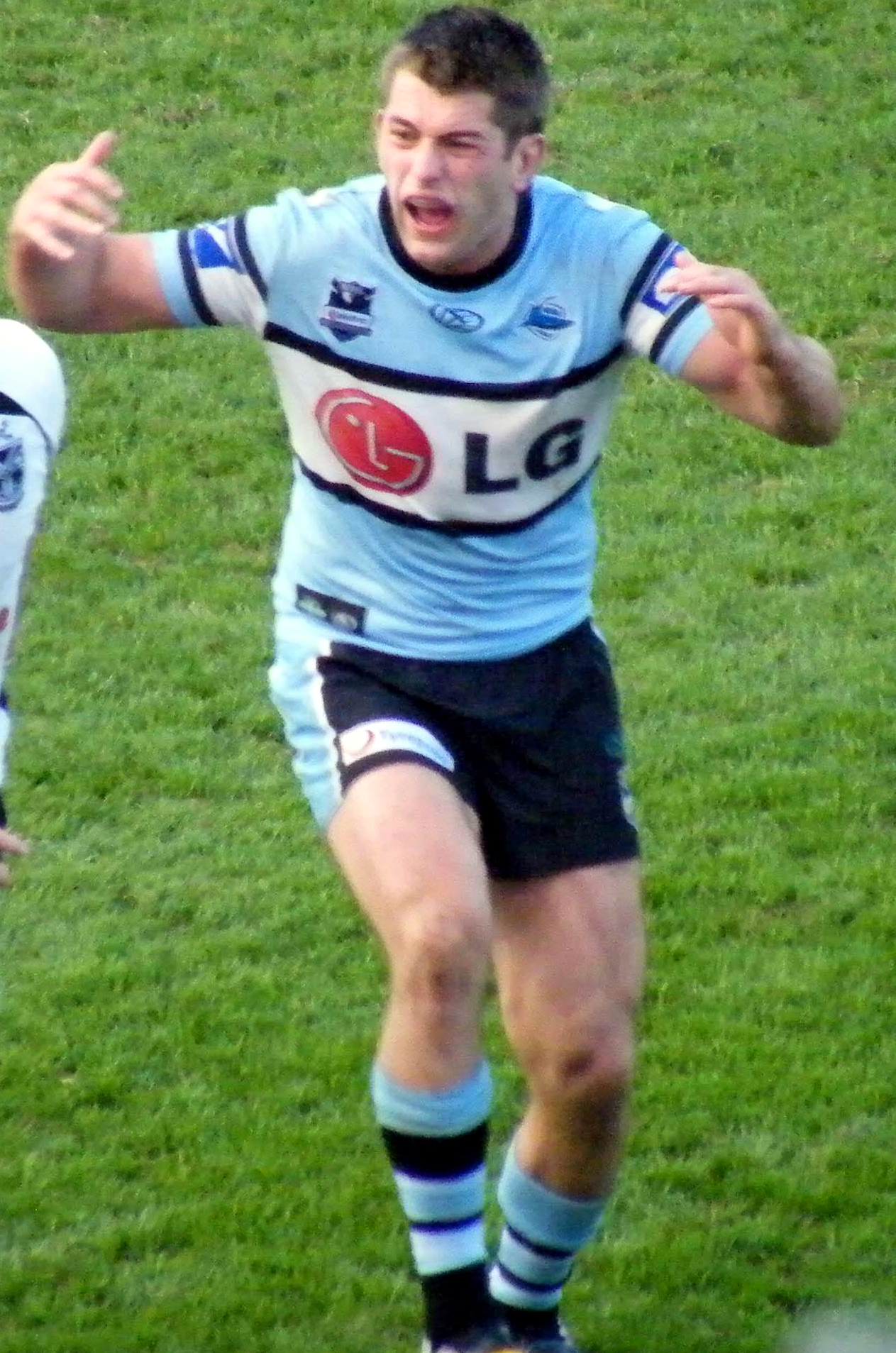

Personal information
- Born: 21 September 1985 (age 41) Sydney, New South Wales, Australia
- Height: 187 cm (6 ft 2 in)
- Weight: 102 kg (16 st 1 lb)

Playing information
- Position: Second-row
Club
Years	Team	Pld	T	G	FG	P
2003–09	Cronulla Sharks	98	9	0	0	36
Representative
Years	Team	Pld	T	G	FG	P
2007	NSW City	1	0	0	0	0
- Source: As of 17:28, 8 September 2008 (UTC)

Reece Williams (born 21 September 1985 in Sydney, New South Wales) is an Australian former professional rugby league footballer and referee. As a player, he played for the Cronulla-Sutherland Sharks in the National Rugby League competition where he played Second Row, Prop Forward and Centre. Williams retired in 2010 following a series of injuries.

== Early career ==
Williams played football for the Yarrawarrah Tigers. He went to school at Endeavour Sports High School in Caringbah NSW.

== Playing career ==
Williams made his first grade debut in Round 23, Cronulla v St George Illawarra at Toyota Park, 16 August 2003. Williams was rewarded for good form in 2007 when he was selected for City Origin. Williams missed the majority of the 2008 season through a knee injury requiring a knee reconstruction.

During 2009 and 2010, Williams suffered a series of head knocks that left him hospitalised twice in an eight-month period (August 2009 and March 2010). In 2009, Williams had a blood clot on his brain requiring surgery. In March 2010, after being hospitalised for concussion, a further blood clot was found on the player's spine. Despite his determination to return to playing football, at the end of 2010, Williams accepted medical advice and announced his retirement.

Williams was a one-club player from the local juniors ranks, racking up 98 NRL games for the Cronulla-Sutherland Sharks since his 2003 debut.

While playing professional football, Williams studied part-time and completed a Certificate III and IV in Personal Training as well as a Management certificate. On retirement, he started a Personal Training business specialising in weight loss and fitness, and has been used as an example for young players to look for a career beyond their playing days.

== Refereeing career ==
Williams became a member of the NRL Referees full-time squad in 2013.
