= Paul Green (rugby league) =

Australian rugby league footballer and coach (1972–2022)

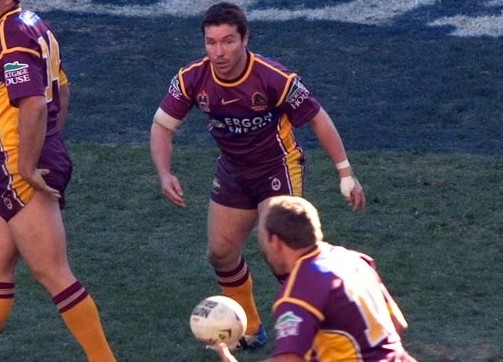

Personal information
- Full name: Paul Gregory Green
- Born: 12 September 1972 Brisbane, Queensland, Australia
- Died: 11 August 2022 (aged 49) Wynnum, Queensland, Australia

Playing information
- Height: 167 cm (5 ft 6 in)
- Weight: 80 kg (12 st 8 lb)
- Position: Halfback, Hooker
Club
Years	Team	Pld	T	G	FG	P
1994–98	Cronulla Sharks	95	24	3	0	102
1999–00	North Qld Cowboys	35	7	0	0	28
2001–02	Sydney Roosters	20	6	0	1	25
2003	Parramatta Eels	7	0	0	0	0
2004	Brisbane Broncos	5	0	0	0	0
	Total	162	37	3	1	155
Representative
Years	Team	Pld	T	G	FG	P
1998–01	Queensland	7	1	0	0	4
1997	Australia (SL)	2	0	0	0	0
1997	Queensland (SL)	3	0	0	0	0

Coaching information
Club
Years	Team	Gms	W	D	L	W%
2014–20	North Qld Cowboys	167	87	0	80	52
Representative
Years	Team	Gms	W	D	L	W%
2012–13	Queensland Residents	2	2	0	0	100
2021	Queensland	3	1	0	2	33

Paul Gregory Green (12 September 1972 – 11 August 2022) was an Australian professional rugby league football coach, best known for taking the North Queensland Cowboys to the NRL premiership in 2015, and a professional rugby league footballer who played in the 1990s and 2000s.

He played for the Cronulla-Sutherland Sharks, North Queensland Cowboys, Sydney Roosters, Parramatta Eels and the Brisbane Broncos, winning the Rothmans Medal in 1995. He was a Queensland State of Origin and Australian international representative halfback. As a coach, Green guided the North Queensland club to their first premiership in 2015 and to another grand final two years later.

== Playing career ==
=== Early years ===
Paul Gregory Green was born on 12 September 1972 in Brisbane, Queensland, and was a Wynnum Manly Seagulls junior. He captained the Queensland Colts before winning Brisbane Rugby League's Rothmans Medal in 1993 while playing for the Easts Tigers. Green's Tigers lost the 1993 BRL Grand Final 18–12 to Western Suburbs, despite Green scoring a try for the Eastern Suburbs side.

=== Cronulla-Sutherland Sharks ===
In 1994, Green followed his Easts' coach John Lang to Sydney's Cronulla-Sutherland, turning heads with the maturity and skill of his play at halfback. In his rookie season in the NSWRL, Green played 24 games. In 1995, he backed up his solid debut season by winning the ARL's prestigious Rothmans Medal (which has since become the Dally M Medal) as best and fairest player.

Following Cronulla's defection to Super League, Green was selected for Australia as a reserve in the 1997 ANZAC Test, before representing Queensland as a replacement in three Super League Tri-series matches. At the end of the season, he was chosen as halfback in the return Test against New Zealand in September, but an injury kept him out of Australia's tour of Great Britain. After missing just one match in four seasons, a serious shoulder injury restricted Green to just four matches in 1998.

=== North Queensland Cowboys ===
In 1999, Green joined the North Queensland Cowboys and was the starting halfback for most of the year. That season he became the club's first State of Origin representative, when he was selected as Queensland's halfback for Game 2 of the series. In 2000, Green fell out of favour with coach Tim Sheens who preferred the halves' partnership of Scott Prince and Noel Goldthorpe. Despite this, Green once again represented Queensland. The Cowboys then sacked Green midway through the season for allegedly negotiating with other clubs while still under contract. Green would subsequently win an out-of-court settlement against the club.

=== Sydney Roosters ===
In 2001, Green returned to Sydney, joining the Sydney Roosters. That season he played 19 games, starting 17 of them at halfback and earned another Origin recall, playing in all three games in Queensland's series win. In 2002, Green injured his knee in the Roosters' opening game against the South Sydney Rabbitohs, ruling him out for the whole of the Roosters' premiership-winning season.

=== Parramatta Eels ===
In 2003, Green joined the Parramatta Eels. After starting the first 7 games at halfback, Green fractured his cheekbone which ended his season.

=== Brisbane Broncos ===
Green returned to Queensland in 2004, signing with the Brisbane Broncos. After spending most of the season in the Queensland Cup, he made five appearances for the Broncos towards the end of the season before retiring.

== Coaching career ==
After his playing retirement in 2004, Green began his coaching career in 2005 as a specialist coach with the Brisbane Broncos, mainly working with the club's halves and hookers. This continued until 2008, and in 2009 he was promoted to be an assistant coach of the Brisbane Broncos. Green moved on to feeder club Wynnum Manly Seagulls in 2010, coaching them in the 2011 and 2012 Queensland Cups, winning back-to-back premierships.

In 2012, Green was appointed head coach of representative team the Queensland Residents, which consists of the best players and coach from the Queensland Cup competition, and beat the New South Wales Residents.

In 2013, he was appointed head coach of the Sydney Roosters Toyota Cup Under 20s team and an assistant coach to the NRL side. The Roosters won the 2013 NRL premiership while Green's NYC side made the preliminary finals in the Under 20s competition.

During the build-up to NRL Grand Final week in 2015, then Brisbane Broncos coach Wayne Bennett explained that he had held Green's coaching career back. With the inaugural season of the Under 20s competition set to get underway, Bennett said the North Queensland mentor was in line for the role of coach. Ultimately it went to ex Penrith Panthers coach Anthony Griffin.

=== North Queensland Cowboys ===
In 2014, Green commenced his NRL head coaching career with the North Queensland Cowboys, claiming the club's first title at the inaugural NRL Auckland Nines, defeating the Brisbane Broncos in the Grand Final. Green took the Cowboys to within a whisker of the top 4 finish in 2014. They finished the season with 15 wins, in fifth place. During the season Green made some decisions which analysts saw as defining the Cowboys' quality season, including shifting halfback Michael Morgan to the fullback position, switching captain Johnathan Thurston from five-eighth back to the halfback position and giving young gun Jason Taumalolo a spot in the starting line-up.

The 2014 finals series saw the Cowboys eliminated in controversial fashion once again. After defeating the eighth placed Brisbane Broncos 32–20 in week one of the finals series, North Queensland travelled to Sydney to take on the Sydney Roosters, and lost the match 31–30. A last minute try to Johnathan Thurston which would have given them victory was disallowed by the video referees. After trailing 30–0 in the early stages of the first half, Green said in the post match press conference that the team should not lick their wounds over the controversial call which ended their season as their start was not good enough to deserve the win. Green finished the season coaching the North Queensland side to 16 wins from 26 starts.

Green broke records with North Queensland in 2015. After the club started their season with three losses, Green then went on to take the club to 11 wins in a row. The Cowboys finished the year with the most wins they had ever recorded in the regular season: 17. They had their first top 4 finish since 2007.

North Queensland lost 16–12 against the Brisbane Broncos in week 1 of the finals series, before putting in the most clinical display from a single club all year in the following week's semi-final against Cronulla. The Cowboys won that match 39–0. Then came the Preliminary Final, their first since 2007. The Cowboys beat the Melbourne Storm 32–12 in that match, booking their place in the 2015 NRL Grand Final against the Brisbane Broncos. It was their first Grand Final in a decade; they had finished runners-up in 2005. The Cowboys claimed their maiden premiership with a 17–16 win over the Brisbane Broncos. This made Green the first coach in history to defeat the Brisbane Broncos in a Grand Final, a team which had a perfect record going into the game with 6 wins from 6 attempts.

In December 2015, Green was offered the vacant head coaching role of the Queensland State of Origin side. Green ultimately turned down the job to concentrate solely on the Cowboys.

On 22 February 2016 Green coached the Cowboys to their first World Club Championship victory defeating Leeds 34–4. In the regular NRL season, Green would coach the Cowboys to win their first five home games in a row, a club record. North Queensland finished the regular season in fourth place on the ladder. In week one of the finals the club lost to the Melbourne Storm 16–10 before defeating the Brisbane Broncos 26–20 in a 90-minute thriller in the Semi-Finals in a match rated the best of the season. Green and the Cowboys fell short in the preliminary finals losing to the Cronulla-Sutherland Sharks 32–20, falling just one game short of a second consecutive Grand Final. Green coached the Cowboys to their best ever defensive season in the NRL in 2016, conceding the fewest points in club history with just 355 in the regular season, an average of 14.79 points per game.

After opening the 2017 season with two consecutive golden point victories against Canberra and Brisbane, Green was courted by the NZRL to become assistant coach of the New Zealand Rugby League Test Team for the 2017 World Cup. The Cowboys limped into the 2017 Finals series in 8th place after an injury crisis saw co-captains Matthew Scott and Johnathan Thurston ruled out early in the season. The Cowboys were able to upset reigning premiers the Cronulla-Sutherland Sharks in the Qualifying Finals, the Parramatta Eels in the Semi-Finals and the Sydney Roosters in the Preliminary Finals to secure a spot in the Grand Final against the Melbourne Storm. In Green's second grand final, his injury-depleted side would fall short 34–6. Green was widely praised for getting North Queensland into their second grand final in the space of three seasons; at one stage, in rounds 23–24, he had 17 players out with injury.

2018 wasn't Green's best season in charge of North Queensland. After winning the pre-season Johnathan Thurston and Cameron Smith testimonial against the Melbourne Storm, many predicted a premiership season for the club but by the end of the season and a host of injuries, the side finished 13th on the ladder with just 8 wins and 16 losses. The club's biggest win of the year was over the Brisbane Broncos in Round 22 where they took home the Queensland Derby shield.

Following a strong pre-season in 2019 with wins over Melbourne and the Gold Coast, Paul Green became the coach with most wins in club history when his side defeated the Warriors in Round 6. The club won three games in a row for the first time since 2017 following their Round 12 victory over the Gold Coast Titans in which the side prevailed 6–4.

In February 2020, Green led the Cowboys' to their second NRL Nines championship, after they defeated the St George Illawarra Dragons in the final.

On 20 July 2020, after a disappointing start, Green stepped down from his role as Cowboys' head coach just 10 games into the season.

=== Queensland ===
Green was appointed as head coach of Queensland for the 2021 State of Origin series. In game one of the series, Queensland were defeated 50–6 by New South Wales at Queensland Country Bank Stadium in Townsville.

In game two of the series, Queensland were defeated 26–0 by New South Wales at Suncorp Stadium putting Green under intense media scrutiny.

Queensland came back to win the game three, with Green's side defeating New South Wales 20–18 at Cbus Super Stadium on the Gold Coast.

== Achievements and accolades ==
=== Player ===
- BRL Rothmans Medal: 1993
- Rothmans Medal: 1995

=== Assistant coach ===
- 2006 NRL Grand Final: Brisbane Broncos – Winners
- 2013 NRL Grand Final: Sydney Roosters – Winners

=== Head coach ===
- 2011 Queensland Cup Grand Final: Wynnum Manly Seagulls – Winners
- 2012 Queensland Cup Grand Final: Wynnum Manly Seagulls – Winners
- 2014 NRL Auckland Nines: North Queensland Cowboys – Winners
- 2015 NRL Grand Final: North Queensland Cowboys – Winners
- 2016 World Club Challenge: North Queensland Cowboys – Winners
- 2017 NRL Grand Final: North Queensland Cowboys – Runners-up
- 2020 NRL Nines: North Queensland Cowboys – Winners

== Statistics ==
=== Playing ===
Season	Team	Matches	T	G	GK %	F/G	Pts
1994	Cronulla-Sutherland	22	4	0	—	0	16
1995	Cronulla-Sutherland	24	9	0	—	0	36
1996	Cronulla-Sutherland	24	7	2/3	66.67%	0	32
1997	Cronulla-Sutherland	21	3	1/1	100%	0	14
1998	Cronulla-Sutherland	4	1	0	—	0	0
1999	North Queensland	20	4	0	—	0	16
2000	North Queensland	15	3	0	—	0	12
2001	Sydney Roosters	19	6	0	—	1	25
2002	Sydney Roosters	1	0	0	—	0	0
2003	Parramatta	7	0	0	—	0	8
2004	Brisbane	5	0	0	—	0	0
Career totals		162	37	3/4	75%	1	155

=== Coaching ===
Paul Green – Coaching Results by Season
NRL Team	Year	Games	Wins	Draws	Losses	Win %	Notes
North Queensland Cowboys	2014	26	15	0	11	58%	Lost Semi Final, Won Auckland Nines
North Queensland Cowboys	2015	28	20	0	8	71%	Won NRL Premiership
North Queensland Cowboys	2016	27	16	0	11	59%	Lost Preliminary Final, Won World Club Challenge
North Queensland Cowboys	2017	28	16	0	12	57%	Lost Grand Final
North Queensland Cowboys	2018	24	8	0	16	33%	Missed finals
North Queensland Cowboys	2019	24	9	0	15	38%	Missed finals
North Queensland Cowboys	2020	10	3	0	7	30%	Won NRL Nines
North Queensland Cowboys	Career	167	87	0	80	52%	

== Personal life ==
Green was married to Amanda and had two children. He played the violin and was a pilot of both fixed-wing planes and helicopters.

== Death ==
Green died by suicide at his Wynnum, Brisbane, home on 11 August 2022, aged 49.

Green's brain was donated to the Australian Sports Brain Bank, with his family posting on the website "In memory of our beloved Paul, we ask that you support the pioneering work of the Australian Sports Brain Bank" with a goal of raising monies for further understanding of the concussion-related condition chronic traumatic encephalopathy (CTE). A post-mortem examination revealed that Green had one of the most "severe forms" of CTE. Professor Michael Buckland said Green had "an organic brain disease which robbed him of his decision-making and impulse control". He added Green would likely have been "symptomatic for some time".

Sporting positions
Preceded by Wayne Bennett; 2020	Coach Queensland; 2021	Succeeded by Billy Slater; 2022–present
Preceded by Neil Henry; 2009–2013	Coach North Queensland Cowboys; 2014–2020	Succeeded by Josh Hannay (interim); 2020
