= 1991 Cronulla-Sutherland Sharks season =

- NSWRL rank: 10th
- 1991 record: Wins: 8; draws: 3; losses: 11
- Points scored: For: 384 (66 tries, 60 goals); against: 441 (74 tries, 71 goals, 3 field goals)

Team information
- Coach: Allan Fitzgibbon
- Captain: Gavin Miller
- Stadium: Caltex Field
- Avg. attendance: 9,777

Top scorers
- Tries: Jonathan Doxzcking (10); Andrew Ettingshausen (10)
- Goals: Greg Carberry (33)
- Points: Greg Carberry (86)
← 1990	1992 →

The 1991 Cronulla-Sutherland Sharks season was the 25th in the club's history. They competed in the NSWRL's 1991 Winfield Cup premiership.

== Ladder ==
	Team	Pld	W	D	L	PF	PA	PD	Pts
1	Penrith	22	17	1	4	483	250	+233	35
2	Manly-Warringah	22	14	1	7	391	299	+92	29
3	North Sydney	22	14	1	7	345	303	+42	29
4	Canberra	22	14	0	8	452	327	+125	28
5	Canterbury-Bankstown	22	13	1	8	424	374	+50	27
6	Western Suburbs	22	13	1	8	359	311	+48	27
7	Brisbane	22	13	0	9	470	326	+144	26
8	Illawarra	22	12	1	9	451	291	+160	25
9	St. George	22	11	3	8	388	320	+68	25
10	Cronulla-Sutherland	22	8	3	11	384	441	-57	19
11	Eastern Suburbs	22	9	1	12	337	487	-150	19
12	Balmain	22	8	1	13	351	412	-61	17
13	Newcastle	22	6	3	13	308	424	-116	15
14	South Sydney	22	7	0	15	370	513	-143	14
15	Parramatta	22	6	0	16	351	534	-183	12
16	Gold Coast	22	2	1	19	240	492	-252	5
