= 1992 Cronulla-Sutherland Sharks season =

- NSWRL rank: 13th
- 1992 record: Wins: 8; draws: 0; losses: 14
- Points scored: For: 284 (53 tries, 36 goals); against: 395 (71 tries, 55 goals, 1 field goal)

Team information
- Coach: Arthur Beetson
- Captain: Gavin Miller Dan Stains Mark McGaw Andrew Ettingshausen
- Stadium: Caltex Field
- Avg. attendance: 7,308

Top scorers
- Tries: Lindsay Bowne (9)
- Goals: Mitch Healey (25)
- Points: Mitch Healey (58)
← 1991	1993 →

The 1992 Cronulla-Sutherland Sharks season was the 26th in the club's history. They competed in the NSWRL's 1992 Winfield Cup premiership.

== Ladder ==
	Team	Pld	W	D	L	PF	PA	PD	Pts
1	Brisbane	22	18	0	4	506	311	+195	36
2	St. George	22	15	0	7	401	283	+118	30
3	Illawarra	22	13	1	8	318	259	+59	27
4	Newcastle	22	12	2	8	363	267	+96	26
5	Western Suburbs	22	12	1	9	356	327	+29	25
6	Eastern Suburbs	22	12	0	10	392	319	+73	24
7	Canterbury-Bankstown	22	10	2	10	423	417	+6	22
8	Manly-Warringah	22	10	2	10	334	335	-1	22
9	Penrith	22	11	0	11	274	309	-35	22
10	Balmain	22	10	1	11	402	398	+4	21
11	North Sydney	22	10	1	11	376	381	-5	21
12	Canberra	22	10	0	12	435	409	+26	20
13	Cronulla-Sutherland	22	8	0	14	284	395	-111	16
14	South Sydney	22	7	0	15	429	533	-104	14
15	Parramatta	22	6	1	15	276	491	-215	13
16	Gold Coast	22	6	1	15	288	423	-135	11

- Gold Coast Seagulls were docked 2 points due to exceeding the replacement limit in one game.
