= 1995 Sydney Bulldogs season =

Sydney Bulldogs
- 1995 season
- Head coach: Chris Anderson
- Captain: Terry Lamb
- ARL: Premiers
- Top try scorer: Club: Daryl Halligan (12)
- Top points scorer: Club: Daryl Halligan (222)
- Highest home attendance: 20,018 v Canberra Raiders, round six
- Average home attendance: 11,065

The 1995 Sydney Bulldogs season was the 61st in the club's history. Coached by Chris Anderson and captained by Terry Lamb, they competed in the Australian Rugby League's 1995 ARL season, finishing the regular season 6th (out of 20), to qualify for the finals for a 3rd consecutive year. The team went on to win all three of their finals matches to reach the Grand Final against minor premiers, the Manly-Warringah Sea Eagles which the Bulldogs won 17–4, claiming their seventh premiership.

== Ladder ==
	Team	Pld	W	D	L	PF	PA	PD	Pts
1	Manly-Warringah Sea Eagles	22	20	0	2	687	248	+439	40
2	Canberra Raiders	22	20	0	2	634	255	+379	40
3	Brisbane Broncos	22	17	0	5	600	364	+236	34
4	Cronulla-Sutherland Sharks	22	16	0	6	516	287	+229	32
5	Newcastle Knights	22	15	0	7	549	396	+153	30
6	Sydney Bulldogs (P)	22	14	0	8	468	352	+116	28
7	St. George Dragons	22	13	0	9	583	382	+201	26
8	North Sydney Bears	22	11	2	9	542	331	+211	24
9	Sydney City Roosters	22	12	0	10	466	406	+60	24
10	Auckland Warriors	22	13	0	9	544	493	+51	24
11	Western Reds	22	11	0	11	361	549	-188	22
12	Illawarra Steelers	22	10	1	11	519	431	+88	21
13	Western Suburbs Magpies	22	10	0	12	459	534	-75	20
14	Penrith Panthers	22	9	0	13	481	484	-3	18
15	Sydney Tigers	22	7	0	15	309	591	-282	14
16	South Queensland Crushers	22	6	1	15	303	502	-199	13
17	Gold Coast Chargers	22	4	1	17	350	628	-278	9
18	South Sydney Rabbitohs	22	4	1	17	319	686	-367	9
19	Parramatta Eels	22	3	0	19	310	690	-380	6
20	North Queensland Cowboys	22	2	0	20	269	660	-391	4

Source: "ARL 1995 – Season summary & ladder". Rugby League Project.

- Auckland Warriors were stripped of 2 competition points due to exceeding the replacement limit in round 3.

== See also ==
- List of Canterbury-Bankstown Bulldogs seasons
