= 1993 Cronulla-Sutherland Sharks season =

- NSWRFL rank: 10th
- 1993 record: Wins: 9; draws: 0; losses: 13
- Points scored: For: 272 (45 tries, 46 goals); against: 399 (69 tries, 61 goals, 1 field goal)

Team information
- Coach: Arthur Beetson
- Captain: Dan Stains
- Stadium: Caltex Field
- Avg. attendance: 9,503

Top scorers
- Tries: Andrew Ettingshausen (7)
- Goals: Mitch Healey (44)
- Points: Mitch Healey (108)
← 1992	1994 →

The 1993 Cronulla-Sutherland Sharks season was the 27th in the club's history. They competed in the NSWRL's 1993 Winfield Cup premiership.

== Ladder ==
	Team	Pld	W	D	L	PF	PA	PD	Pts
1	Canterbury-Bankstown	22	17	0	5	464	254	+210	34
2	St. George	22	17	0	5	418	258	+160	34
3	Canberra	22	16	1	5	587	272	+315	33
4	Manly-Warringah	22	16	0	6	442	232	+210	32
5	Brisbane	22	16	0	6	517	330	+187	32
6	North Sydney	22	14	1	7	448	325	+123	29
7	Illawarra	22	12	0	10	373	253	+120	24
8	Eastern Suburbs	22	11	1	10	343	356	-13	23
9	Newcastle	22	10	0	12	337	381	-44	20
10	Cronulla-Sutherland	22	9	0	13	272	399	-127	18
11	Parramatta	22	9	0	13	237	439	-202	18
12	Penrith	22	7	0	15	314	428	-114	18
13	Western Suburbs	22	7	0	15	319	475	-156	14
14	South Sydney	22	6	0	16	319	560	-241	12
15	Balmain	22	6	1	15	327	412	-85	11
16	Gold Coast	22	1	0	21	229	572	-343	2

- Balmain were stripped of 2 competition points due to an illegal replacement in one game.
