= 1994 Cronulla-Sutherland Sharks season =

- NSWRL rank: 7th
- 1994 record: Wins: 12; draws: 0; losses: 10
- Points scored: For: 432 (75 tries, 65 goals, 2 field goals); against: 401 (68 tries, 64 goals, 1 field goal)

Team information
- Coach: John Lang
- Captain: Dan Stains Danny Lee
- Stadium: Caltex Field

Top scorers
- Tries: Andrew Ettingshausen (18)
- Goals: Eion Crossan (61)
- Points: Eion Crossan (154)
← 1993	1995 →

The 1994 Cronulla-Sutherland Sharks season was the 28th in the club's history. They competed in the NSWRL's 1994 Winfield Cup premiership.

== Ladder ==
	Team	Pld	W	D	L	PF	PA	PD	Pts
1	Canterbury-Bankstown	22	18	0	4	537	340	+197	36
2	North Sydney	22	17	1	4	517	291	+226	35
3	Canberra	22	17	0	5	677	298	+379	34
4	Manly-Warringah	22	16	1	5	605	311	+294	33
5	Brisbane	22	13	1	8	544	316	+228	27
6	Illawarra	22	11	3	8	484	387	+97	25
7	Cronulla-Sutherland	22	12	0	10	432	401	+31	24
8	Penrith	22	10	2	10	404	448	-44	22
9	South Sydney	22	9	1	12	401	569	-168	19
10	Newcastle	22	9	0	13	427	458	-31	18
11	St. George	22	9	0	13	386	497	-111	18
12	Parramatta	22	7	1	14	350	474	-124	15
13	Western Suburbs	22	6	2	14	439	650	-211	14
14	Eastern Suburbs	22	6	1	15	344	513	-169	13
15	Gold Coast	22	5	1	16	363	618	-255	11
16	Balmain	22	4	0	18	303	642	-339	8
