= Lindsay Bowne =

Australian rugby league footballer

Playing information
- Position: Centre, Wing
Club
Years	Team	Pld	T	G	FG	P
1992–93	Cronulla-Sutherland	26	9	8	0	52

Lindsay Bowne is an Australian former professional rugby league footballer who played for Cronulla-Sutherland.

Bowne came to Cronulla via Grafton, having been a NSW Country Firsts representative player.

Playing as a center and winger, Bowne featured in first-grade at Cronulla for two seasons. He was Cronulla's leading try-scorer in the 1992 NSWRL season, with a total of nine tries.

As of 2018 he is the track manager at Tamworth Jockey Club.
