= 1992 NSWRL season =

Rugby league competition

1992 New South Wales Rugby League
- Teams: 16
- Premiers: Brisbane (1st title)
- Minor premiers: Brisbane (1st title)
- Matches played: 182
- Points scored: 5,993
- Average attendance: 12,540
- Total attendance: 2,282,194
- Top points scorer: Daryl Halligan (168)
- Wooden spoon: Gold Coast; Seagulls (2nd spoon)
- Rothmans Medal: Allan Langer
- Top try-scorer(s): Mark Bell (16); Tim Brasher (16)

The 1992 New South Wales Rugby League Premiership season was the eighty-fifth season of professional rugby league football in Australia. Sixteen teams competed for the J.J. Giltinan Shield during the season which culminated in a grand final for the Winfield Cup between the Brisbane Broncos, making their grand final debut, and the St. George Dragons.

== Season summary ==
The 1992 Great Britain Lions tour of Australia and New Zealand also took place during the season. Having decided in May that a team from Auckland would join the premiership in 1995, the NSWRL announced in November that three more new clubs – from Townsville, Perth and a second team from Brisbane – will also be invited.

Twenty-two regular season rounds were played from March till August, resulting in a top five of Brisbane, St. George, Illawarra, Newcastle and Wests, who battled it out in the finals. The 3rd-place finish for the Illawarra Steelers would be the best season they ever had in its time as a standalone club.

It's the first season played outside of Australia for premiership points in Auckland when Manly hosted Newcastle.

Tragedy struck the 1992 season, with Ben Alexander, being killed a car crash.

The 1992 season's Rothmans Medallist was the Brisbane Broncos' halfback and captain, Allan Langer. The Dally M Award went to Eastern Suburbs' halfback, Gary Freeman, while Western Suburbs forward Paul Langmack was named Rugby League Week's player of the year.

The 1992 season also saw the retirement from the League of future Australian Rugby League Hall of Fame inductee, Wally Lewis.

The grand finals:

- Brisbane Broncos vs St George Dragons (Senior Grade)
- North Sydney Bears vs Balmain Tigers (Reserve Grade)
- West. Suburbs Magpies vs St George Dragons (Under-21s Grade)

The winners in all grades were:

- Brisbane Broncos (Senior Grade)
- North Sydney Bears (Reserve Grade)
- West. Suburbs Magpies (Under-21s Grade)

The Test Match Series

- Australia vs Great Britain

The State of Origin Series

- Queensland vs New South Wales

=== Teams ===
The lineup of teams remained unchanged for the fourth consecutive season, with sixteen clubs contesting the 1992 premiership, including five Sydney-based foundation teams, another six from Sydney, two from regional New South Wales, two from Queensland, and one from Aust. Cap. Territory.

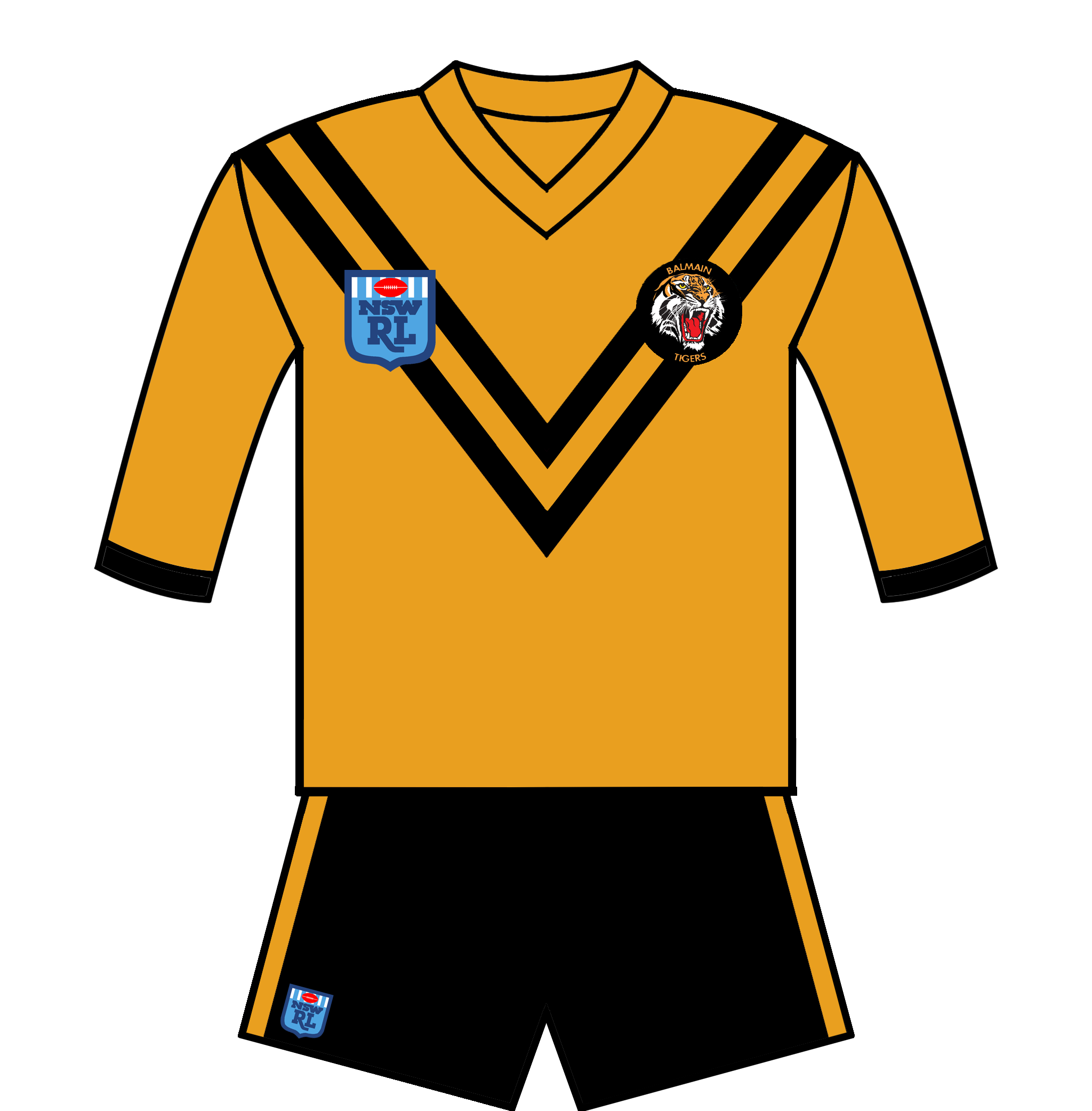
Balmain Tigers 85th season Ground: Leichhardt Oval; Coach: Alan Jones; Captain: Steve Roach

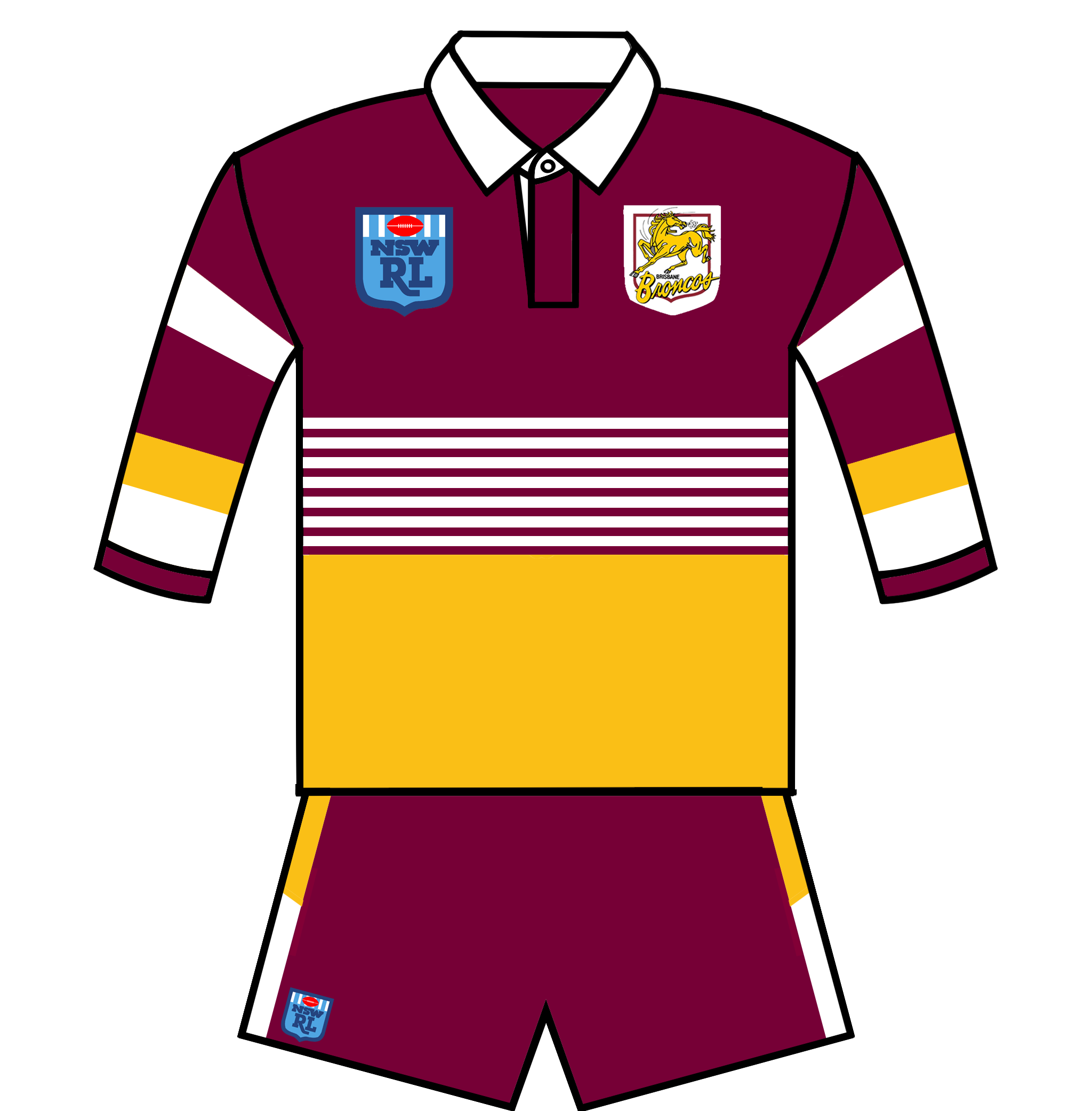
Brisbane Broncos 5th season Ground: Lang Park; Coach: Wayne Bennett; Captain: Allan Langer

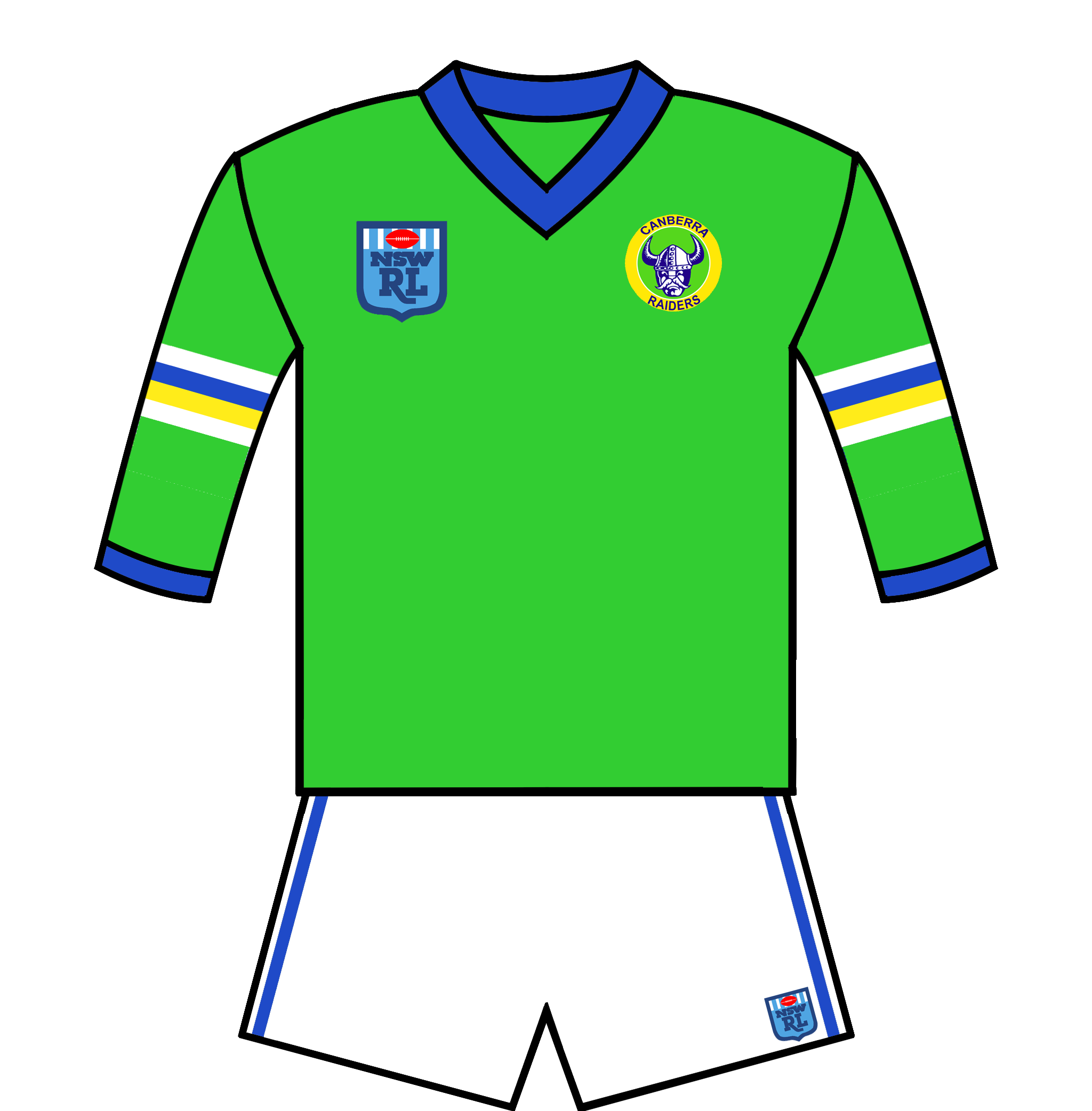
Canberra Raiders 11th season Ground: Bruce Stadium; Coach: Tim Sheens; Captain: Mal Meninga

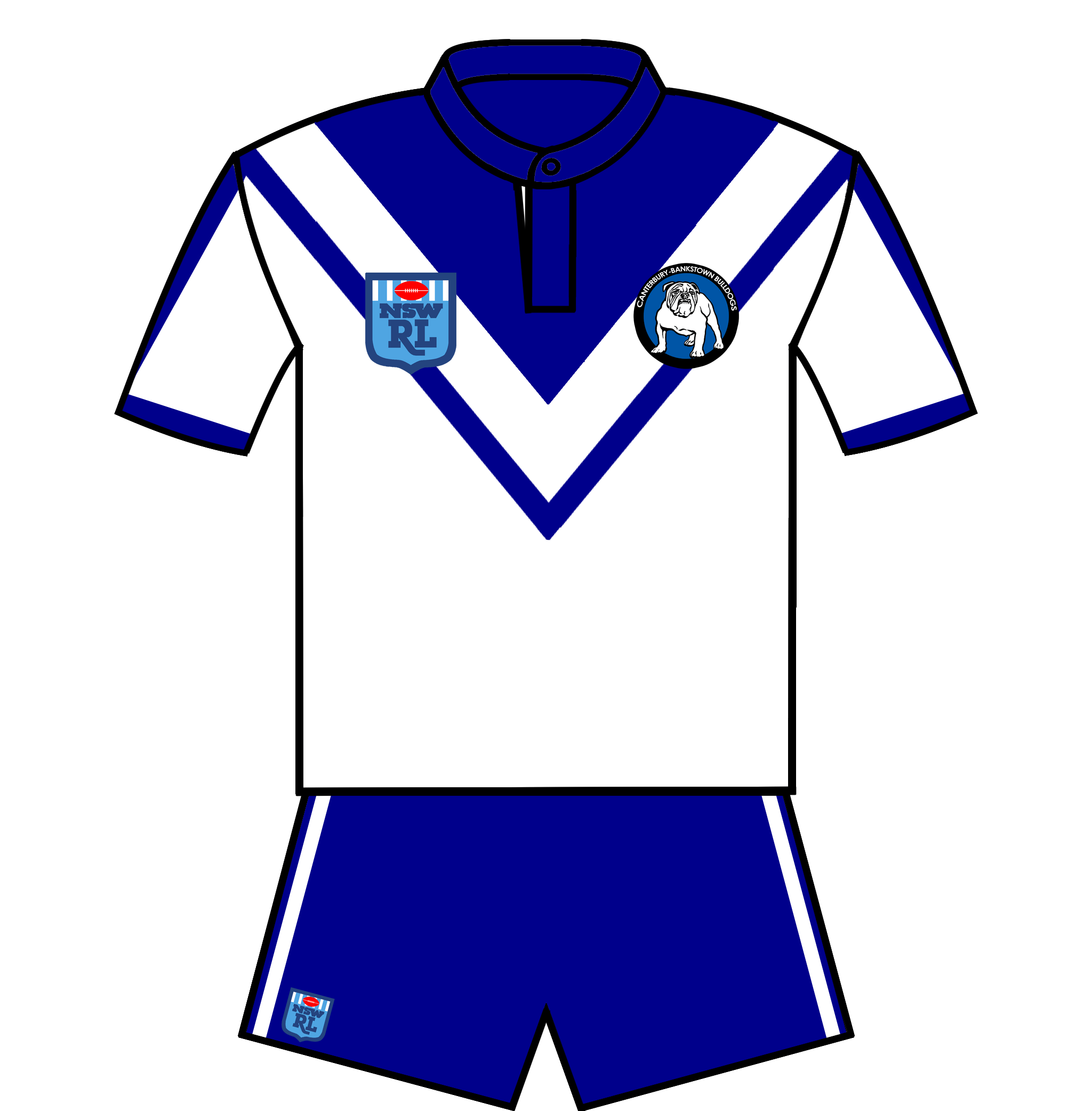
Canterbury Bulldogs 58th season Ground: Belmore Oval; Coach: Chris Anderson; Captain: Terry Lamb

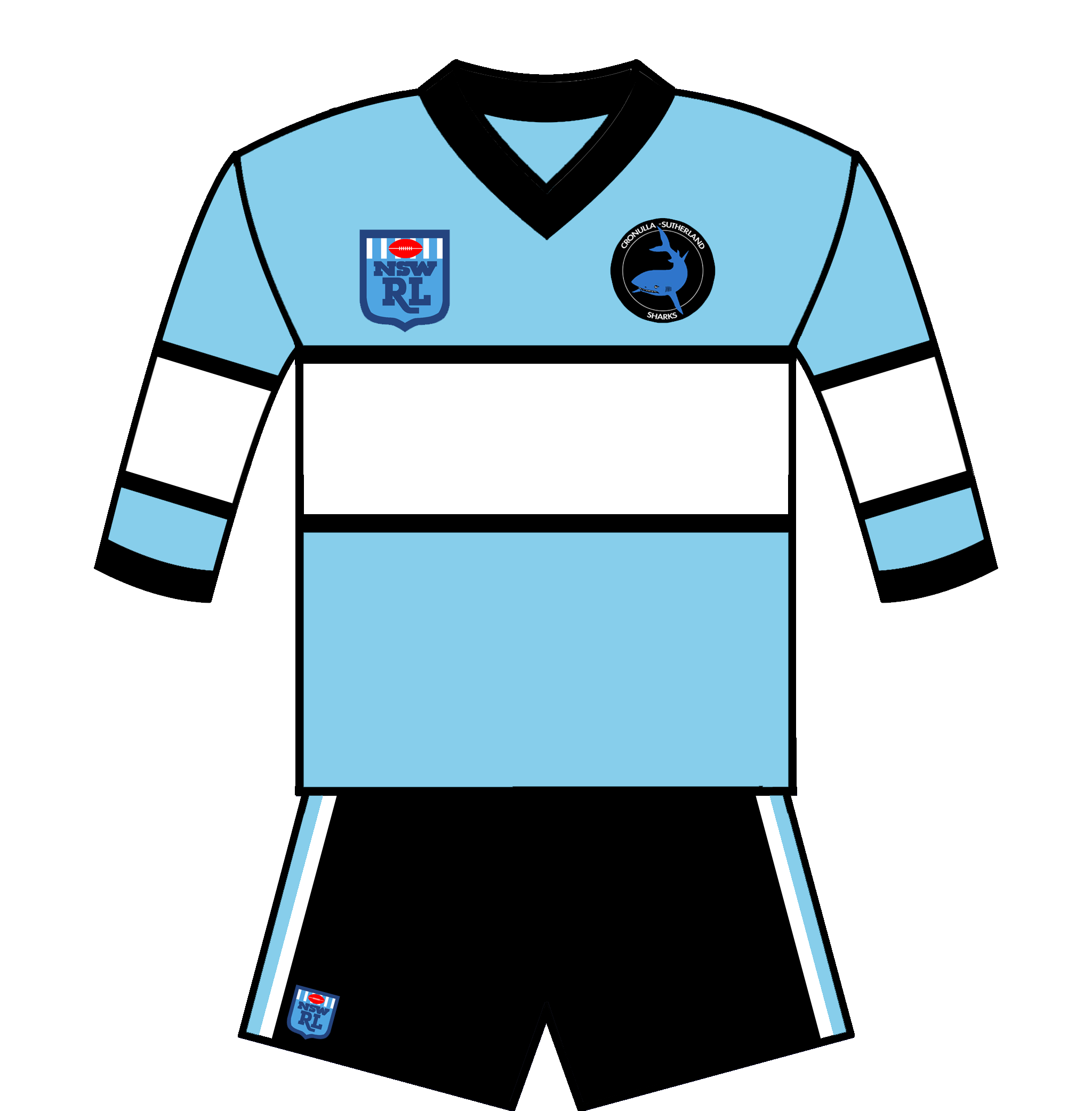
Cronulla Sharks 26th season Ground: Endeavour Park; Coach: Arthur Beetson; Captain: Dan Stains

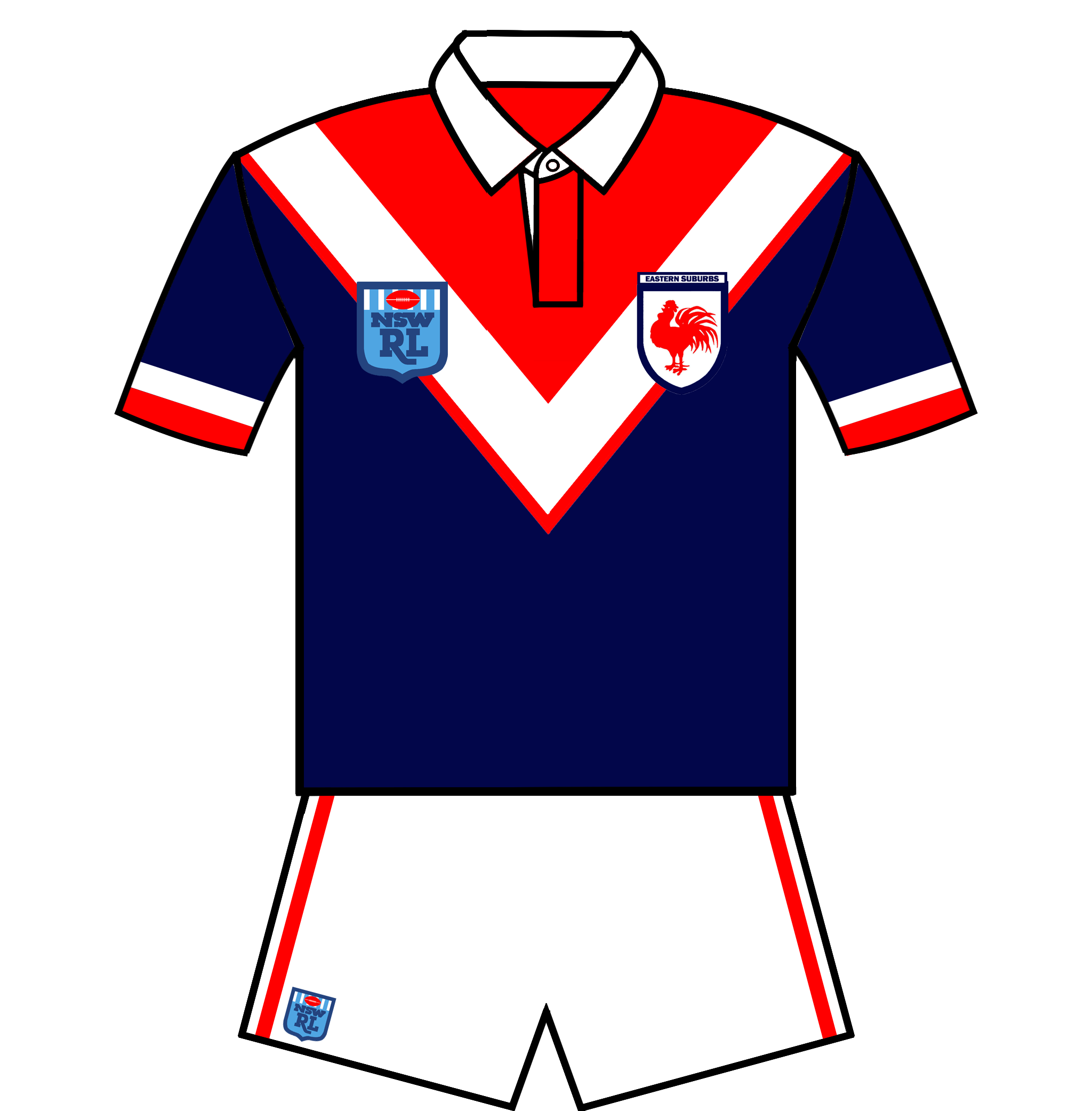
East. Suburbs Roosters 85th season Ground: Sydney Football Stadium; Coach: Mark Murray; Captain: Craig Salvatori

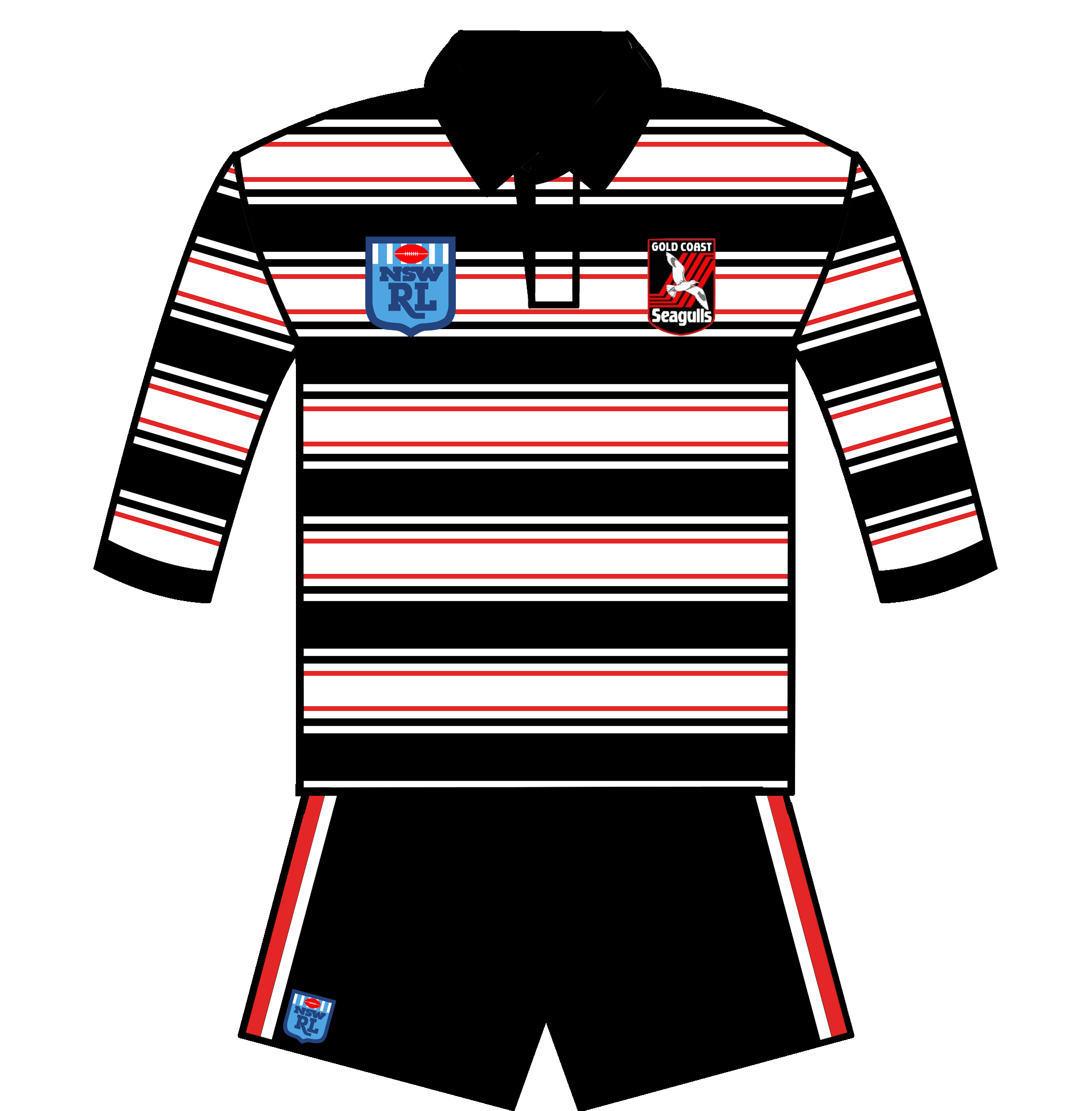
Gold Coast Seagulls 5th season Ground: Seagulls Stadium; Captain: Wally Lewis; Coach: Wally Lewis

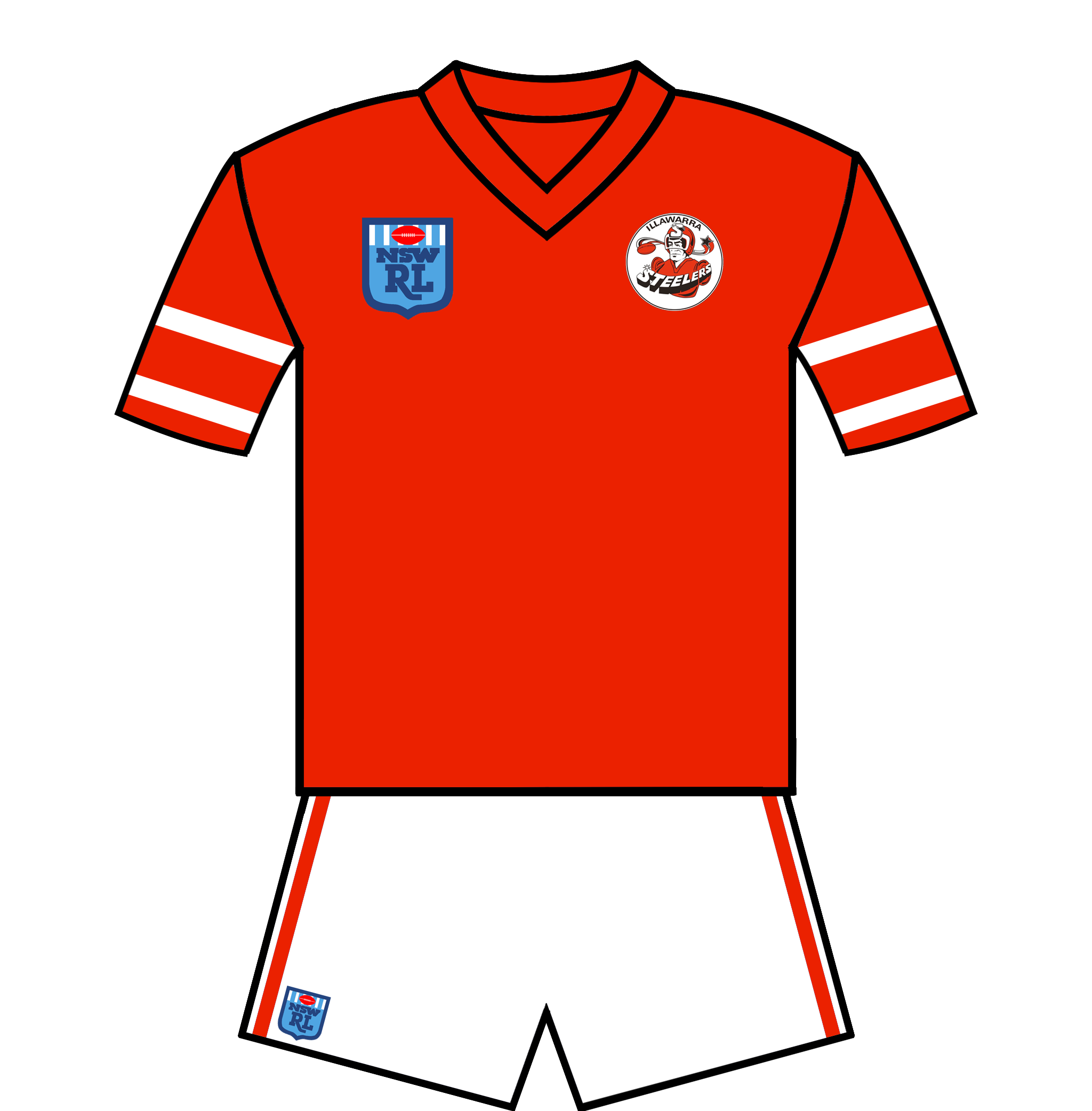
Illawarra Steelers 11th season Ground: Wollongong Stadium; Coach: Graham Murray; Captain: John Cross

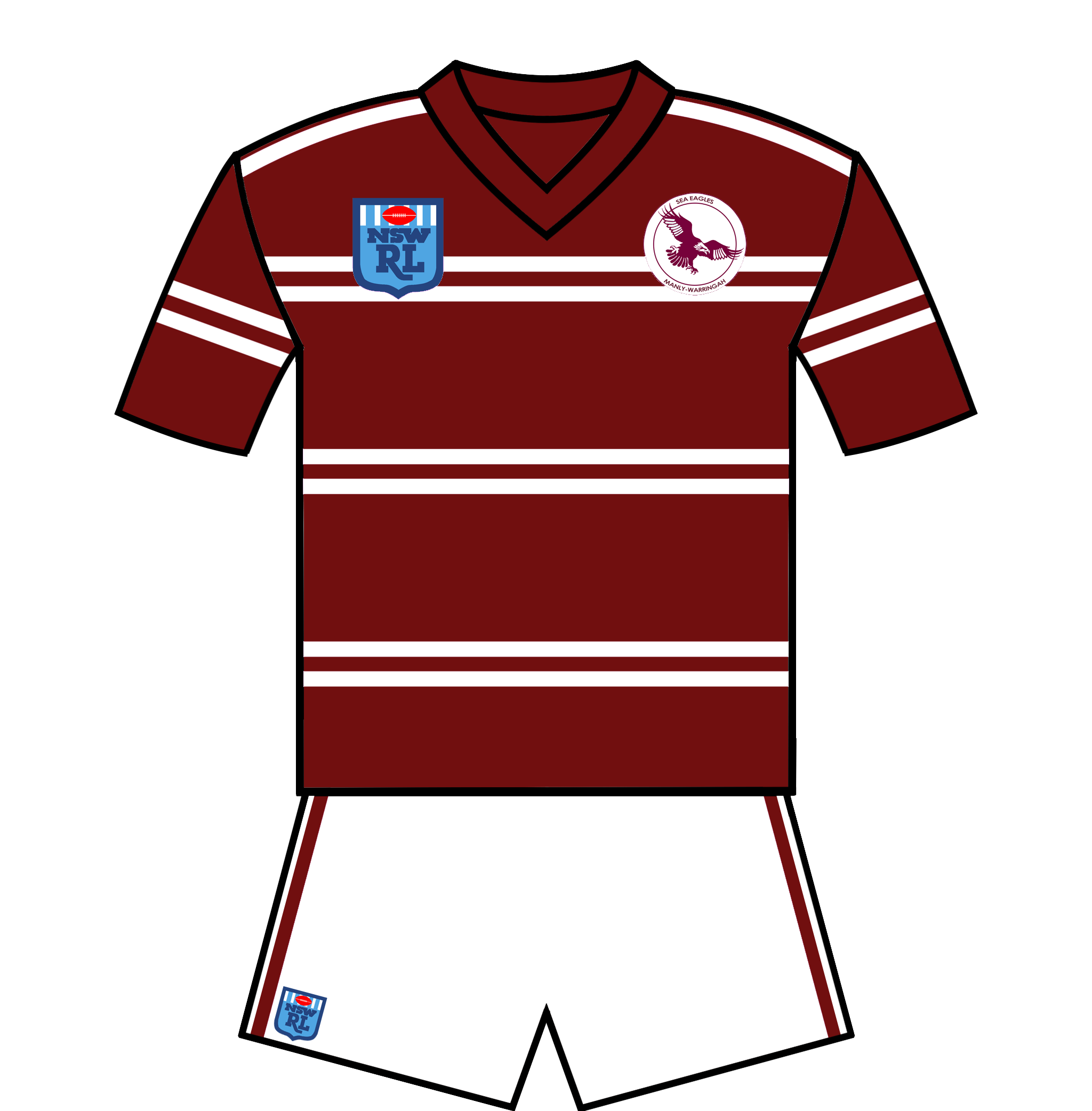
Manly Sea Eagles 46th season Ground: Brookvale Oval; Coach: Graham Lowe; Captain: Michael O'Connor

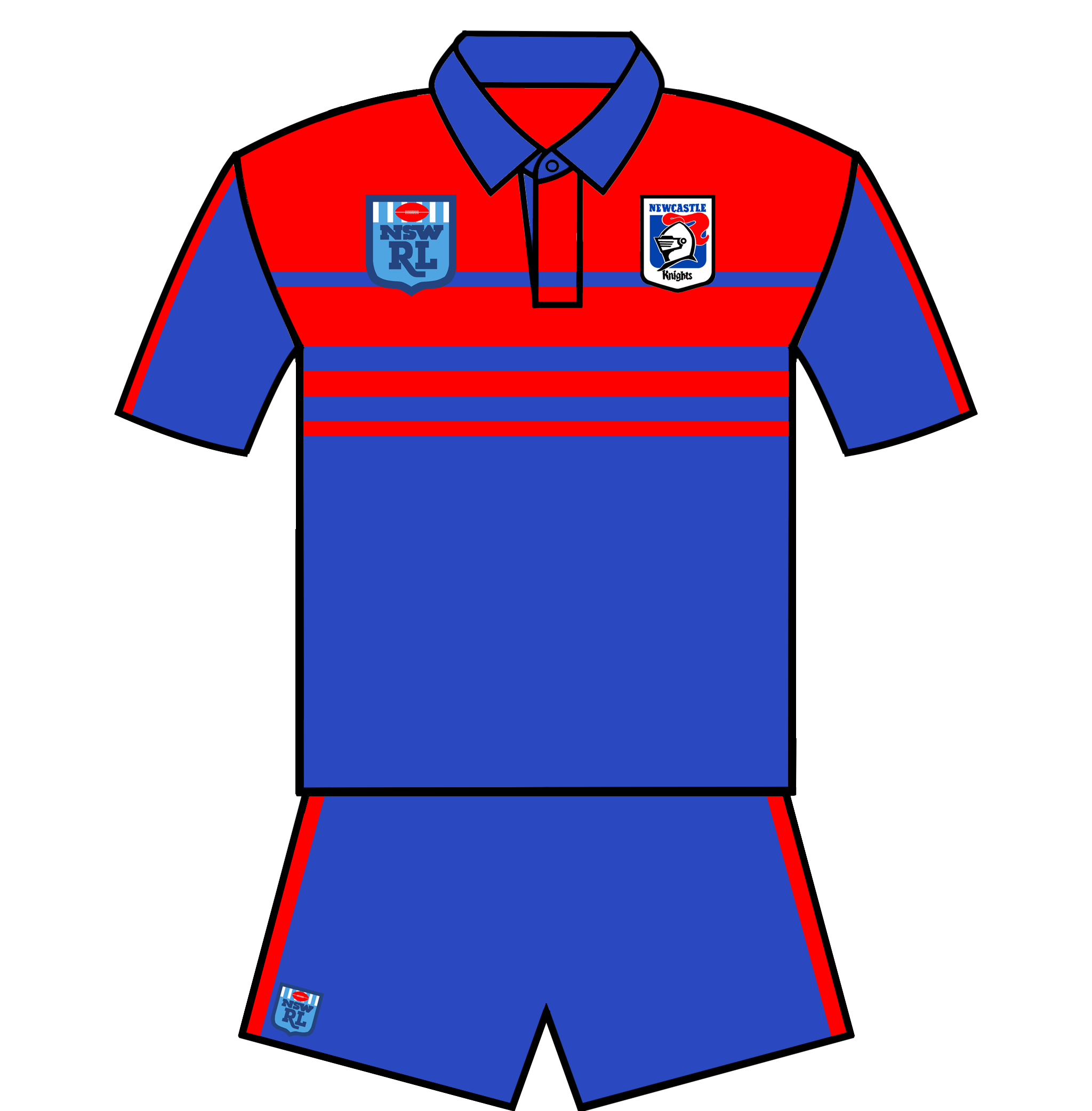
Newcastle Knights 5th season Ground: Marathon Stadium; Coach: David Waite; Captain: Michael Hagan

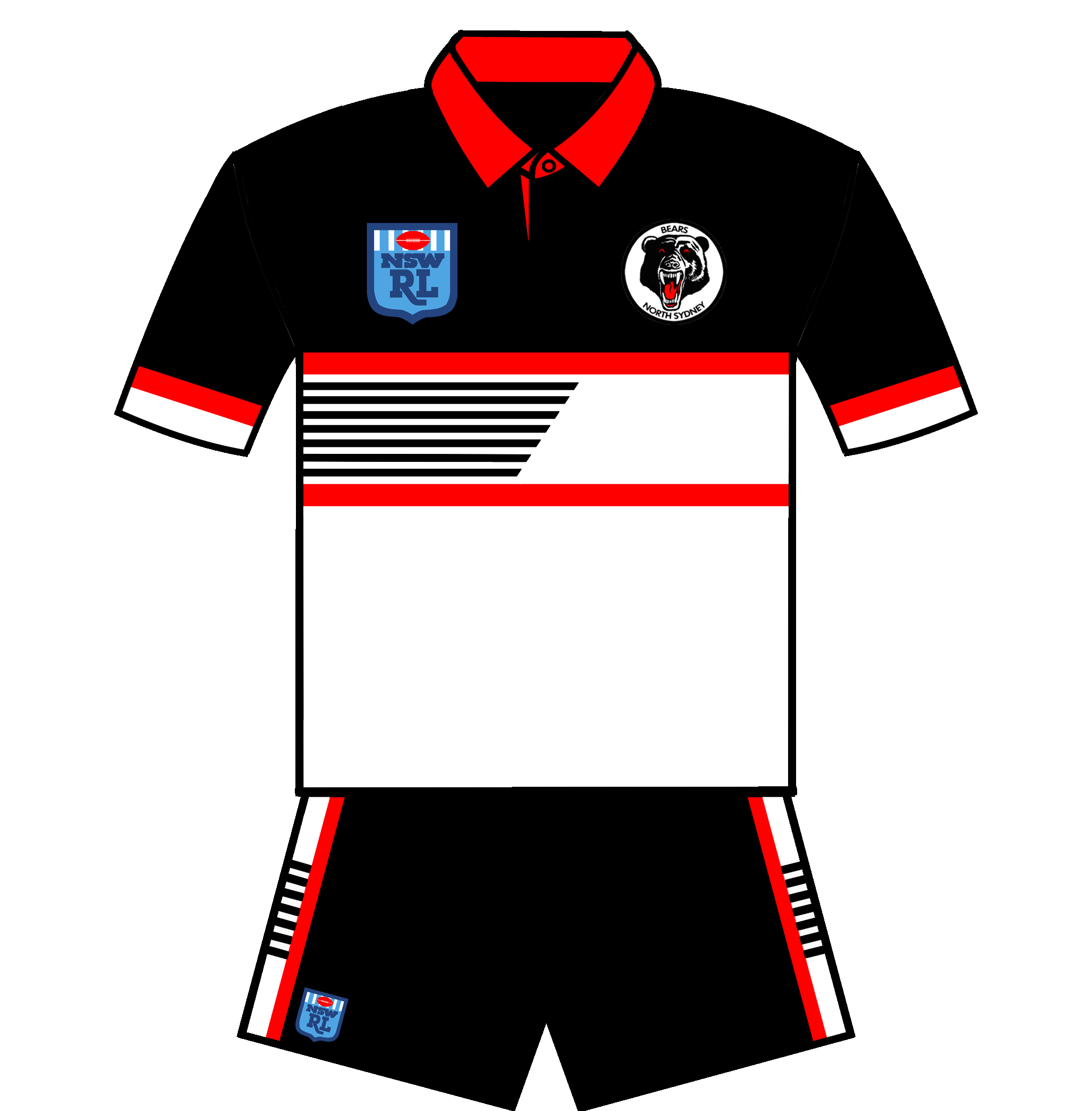
North Sydney Bears 85th season Ground: North Sydney Oval; Coach: Steve Martin; Captain: Peter Jackson

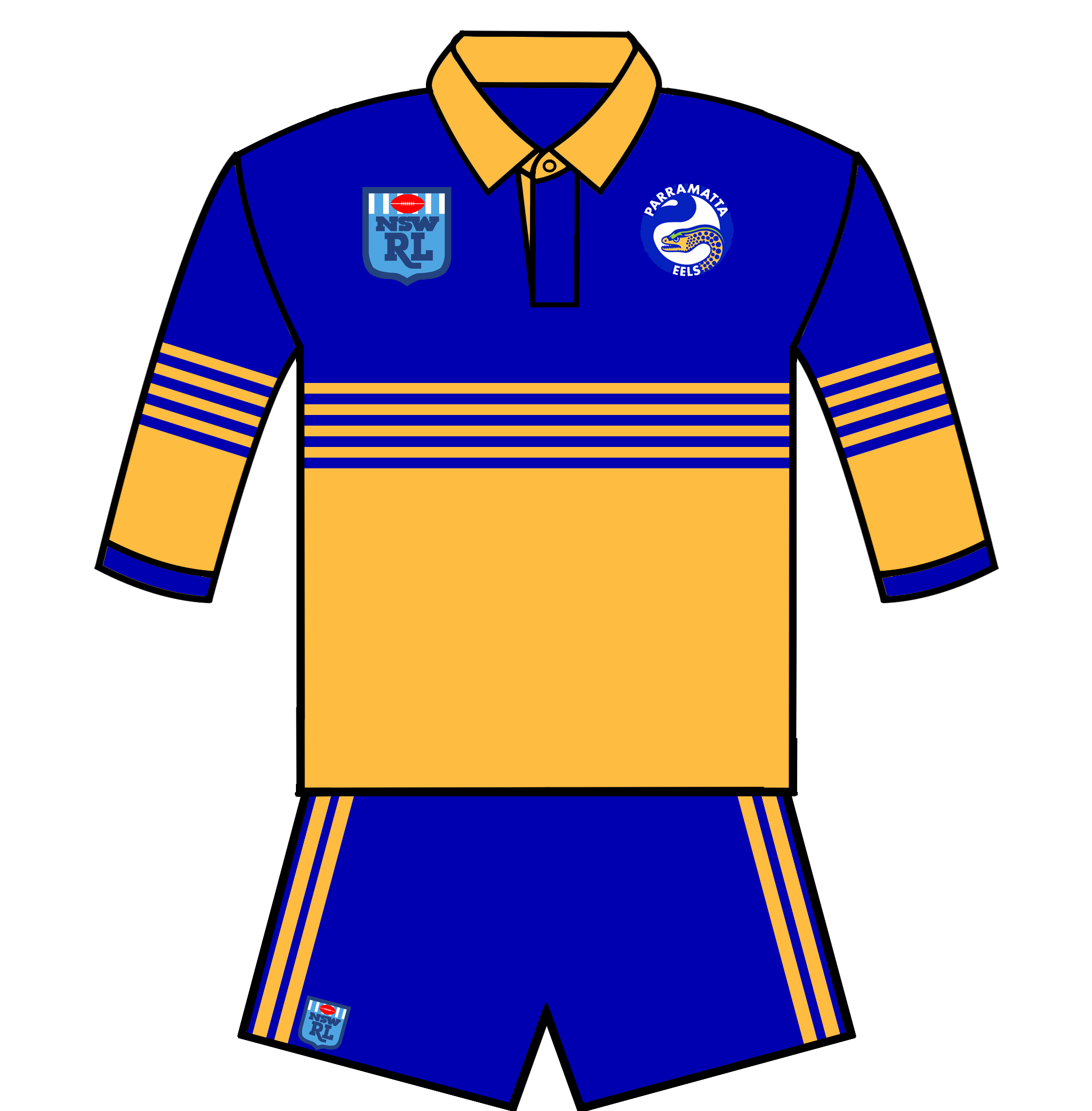
Parramatta Eels 45th season Ground: Parramatta Stadium; Coach: Mick Cronin; Captain: Peter Sterling → Brett Kenny

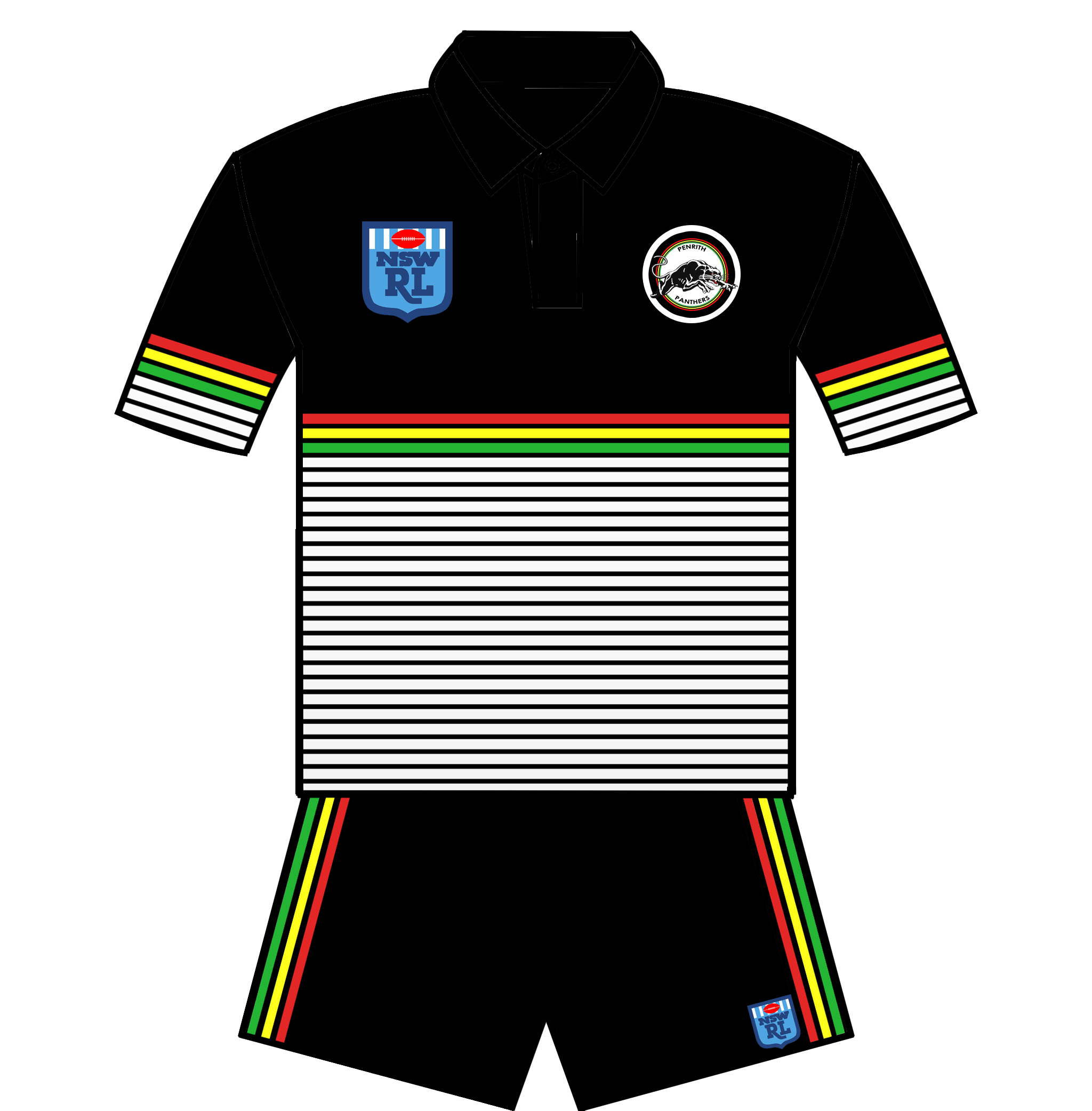
Penrith 26th season Ground: Penrith Stadium; Coach: Phil Gould; Captain: Greg Alexander → John Cartwright

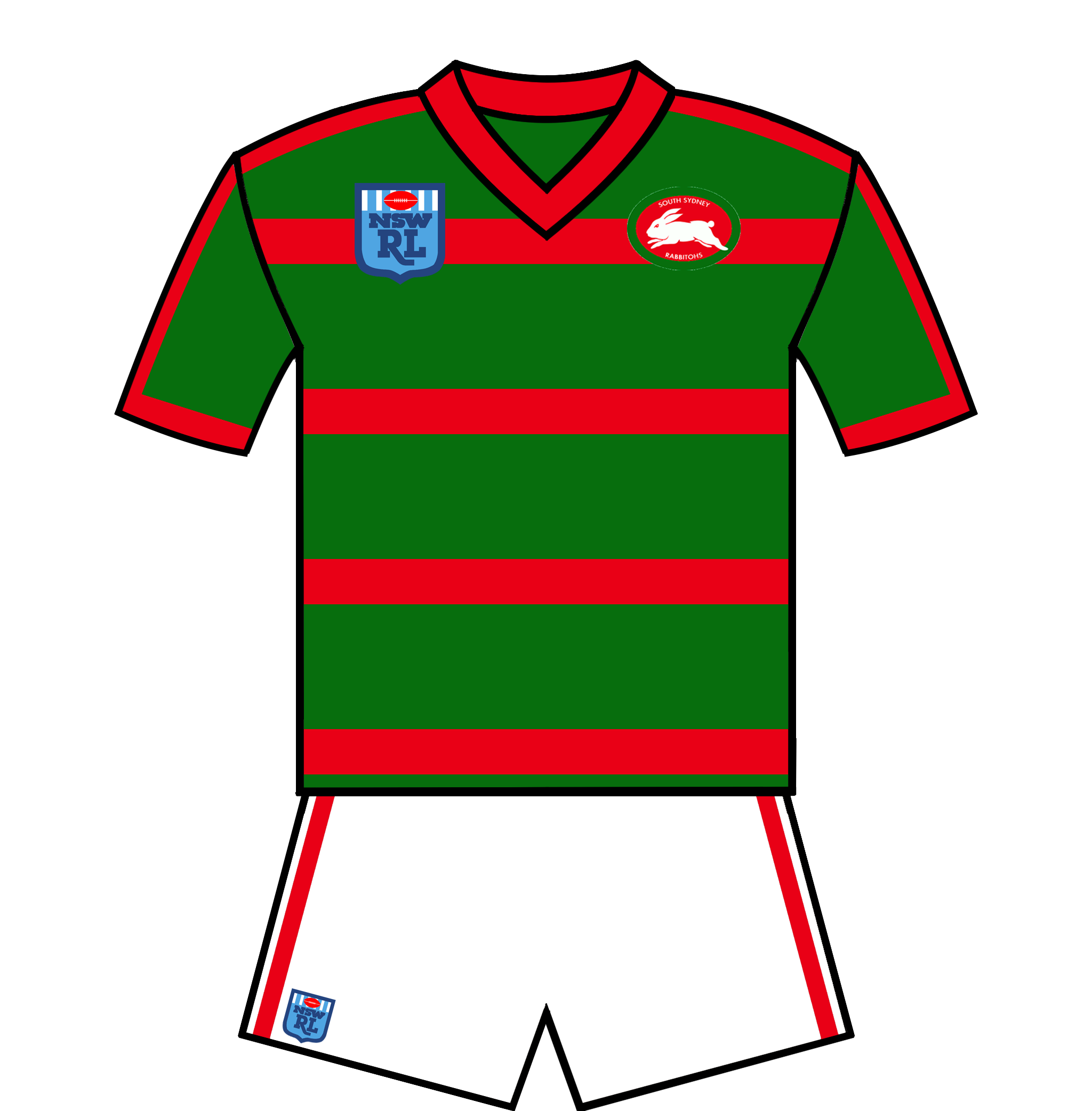
South Sydney 85th season Ground: Sydney Football Stadium; Coach: Frank Curry; Captain: Michael Andrews

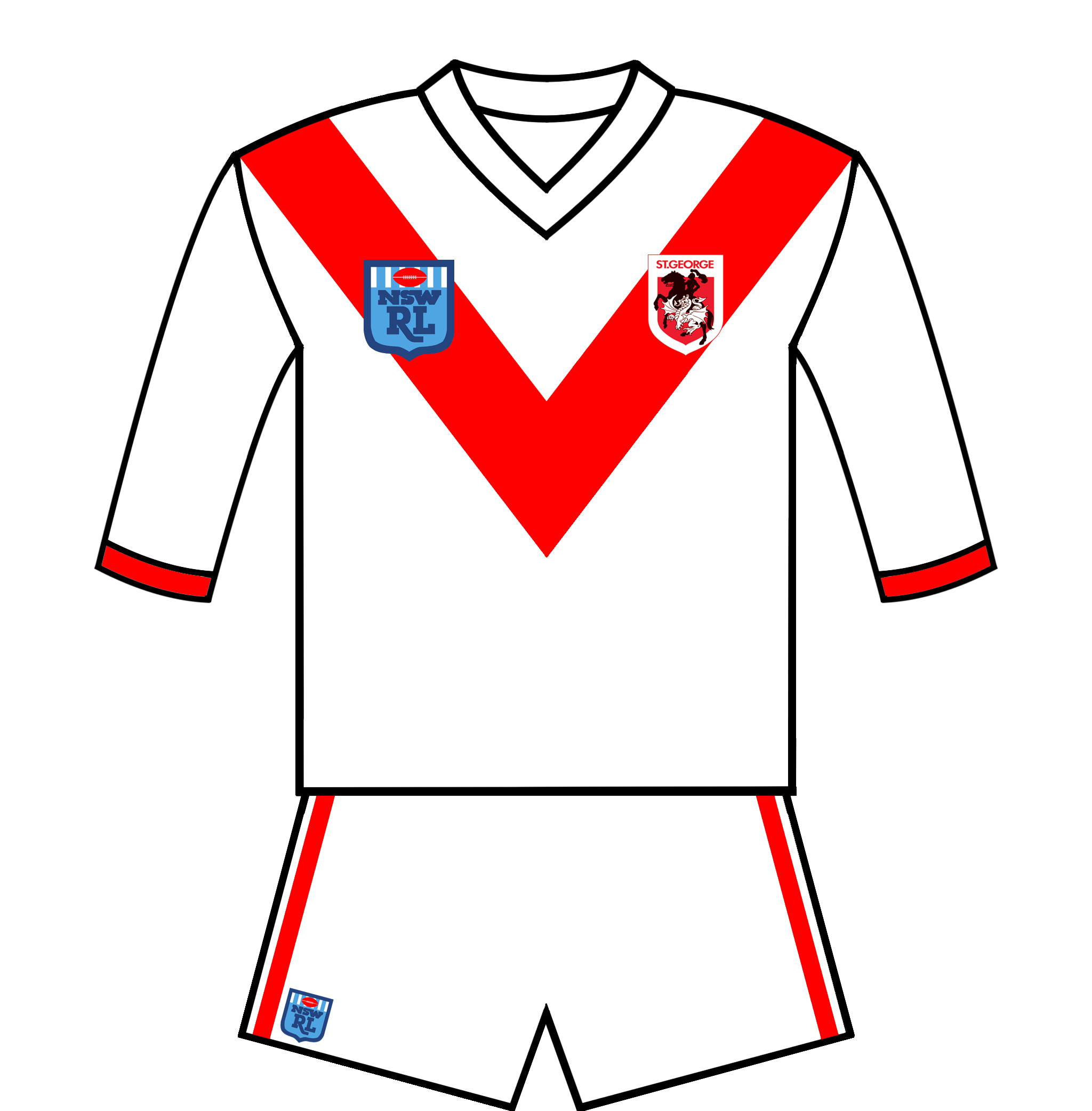
St George Dragons 72nd season Ground: Kogarah Oval; Coach: Brian Smith; Captain: Michael Beattie

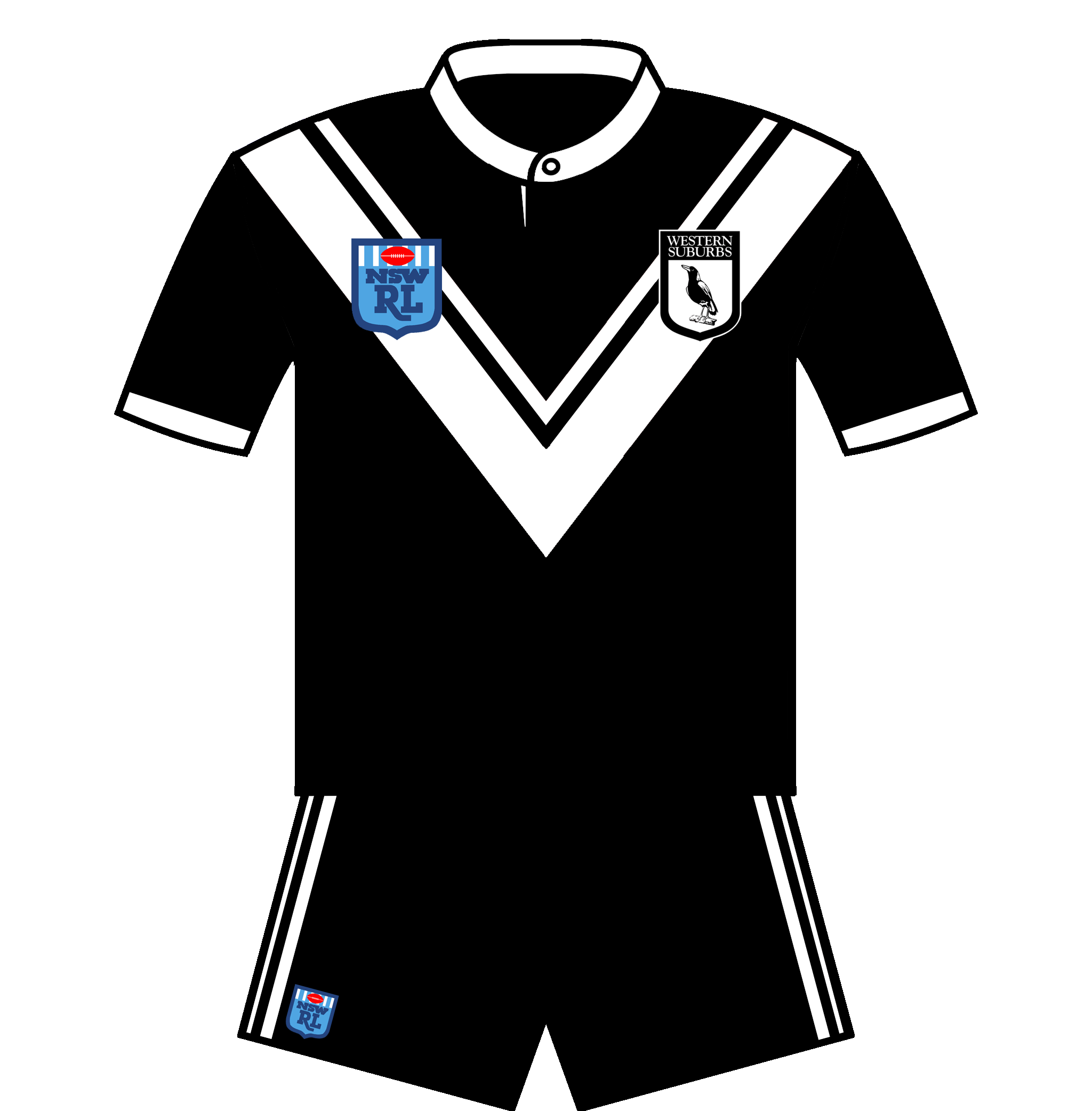
West. Suburbs Magpies 85th season Ground: Campbelltown Stadium; Coach: Warren Ryan; Captain: Joe Thomas → Paul Langmack

=== Advertising ===
Riding the consistent Australian popularity of "The Best" since its 1989 release, due partially to its use and association with the NSWRL, Tina Turner went into a Los Angeles recording studio in early 1992 with Jimmy Barnes to record a duet version specifically for Australian release. The production capitalised on the complementary vocal styles of Turner and Barnes and also features Barnes' brother-in-law Johnny Diesel on guitar.

A simple black-and-white film clip shot around the recording sessions was produced and the track was released and renamed "Simply the Best" to coincide with the 1992 NSWRL season. That year the track peaked at #13 on the Australian charts.

In 1992 and 1993 the League and its advertising agency Hertz Walpole would use the new duet performance of the song in the season launch ads. Excerpts from the black-and-white film clip start the 1992 ad with firstly Tina and then Barnes in wistful solo shots before coming together and displaying a camaraderie that's intended to capture the good times they appear to have had in recording the track. Diesel also appears in the black-and-white footage before the ad bursts into colour with the standard fare of big hits and previous season action.

=== Ladder ===
| | Team | Pld | W | D | L | PF | PA | PD | Pts |
|---|---|---|---|---|---|---|---|---|---|
| 1 | Brisbane (P) | 22 | 18 | 0 | 4 | 506 | 311 | +195 | 36 |
| 2 | St. George | 22 | 15 | 0 | 7 | 401 | 283 | +118 | 30 |
| 3 | Illawarra | 22 | 13 | 1 | 8 | 318 | 259 | +59 | 27 |
| 4 | Newcastle | 22 | 12 | 2 | 8 | 363 | 267 | +96 | 26 |
| 5 | West. Suburbs | 22 | 12 | 1 | 9 | 356 | 327 | +29 | 25 |
| 6 | East. Suburbs | 22 | 12 | 0 | 10 | 392 | 319 | +73 | 24 |
| 7 | Canterbury | 22 | 10 | 2 | 10 | 423 | 417 | +6 | 22 |
| 8 | Manly | 22 | 10 | 2 | 10 | 334 | 335 | -1 | 22 |
| 9 | Penrith | 22 | 11 | 0 | 11 | 274 | 309 | -35 | 22 |
| 10 | Balmain | 22 | 10 | 1 | 11 | 402 | 398 | +4 | 21 |
| 11 | North Sydney | 22 | 10 | 1 | 11 | 376 | 381 | -5 | 21 |
| 12 | Canberra | 22 | 10 | 0 | 12 | 435 | 409 | +26 | 20 |
| 13 | Cronulla | 22 | 8 | 0 | 14 | 284 | 395 | -111 | 16 |
| 14 | South Sydney | 22 | 7 | 0 | 15 | 429 | 533 | -104 | 14 |
| 15 | Parramatta | 22 | 6 | 1 | 15 | 276 | 491 | -215 | 13 |
| 16 | Gold Coast | 22 | 6 | 1 | 15 | 288 | 423 | -135 | 11 |

- Gold Coast Seagulls were docked 2 points due to exceeding the replacement limit in one game.
  Had this not occurred, Parramatta Eels would have won the wooden spoon due to an inferior for and against record.

== Finals ==
A great advertisement for the expansion of the game was the appearance of three non-Sydney teams in the final five - Brisbane, Illawarra and Newcastle - all of whom had only been admitted to the NSWRL within the previous decade. The "steel-city cousins", Illawarra and Newcastle, both won their first semi-finals from their initial attempt, Illawarra defeating St George, and Newcastle downing Wests.

An all non-Sydney decider was a real possibility, with Illawarra and St George meeting a second time in the preliminary final, with Brisbane waiting to play the winner in the grand final.

The Dragons played two of the lowest scoring matches in finals history as they beat Newcastle 3–2 in the semi-final, and Illawarra 4–0 in the preliminary final.

The preliminary final saw four disallowed tries, with Saints denied once in the first half and Illawarra three times in the second half. Illawarra looked as though they were going to finish on top and began opening up the St George defence after the half-time break, only to be denied twice by referee Greg McCallum for forward passes. A late attacking movement from the Steelers saw winger Alan McIndoe excitedly appeal for a try off a John Simon grubber kick, but was denied by the in-goal touch judge. St George held on to win 4-0 and ensure a Sydney club appeared in the grand final once again (with this Sydney representation in grand finals being maintained until the Brisbane-Melbourne decider of 2006).

| Home | Score | Away | Match Information |
| Home | Score | Away | Date and Time | Venue | Referee | Crowd |
|---|---|---|---|---|---|---|
Qualifying Finals
| St. George Dragons | 16–18 | Illawarra Steelers | 5 September 1992 | Sydney Football Stadium | Graeme Annesley | 28,521 |
| Newcastle Knights | 21–2 | Western Suburbs Magpies | 6 September 1992 | Sydney Football Stadium | Greg McCallum | 28,571 |
Semi-finals
| St. George Dragons | 3–2 | Newcastle Knights | 12 September 1992 | Sydney Football Stadium | Graeme Annesley | 38,772 |
| Brisbane Broncos | 22–12 | Illawarra Steelers | 13 September 1992 | Sydney Football Stadium | Greg McCallum | 38,859 |
Preliminary final
| Illawarra Steelers | 0–4 | St. George Dragons | 20 September 1992 | Sydney Football Stadium | Greg McCallum | 38,928 |
Grand final
| Brisbane Broncos | 28-8 | St. George Dragons | 27 September 1992 | Sydney Football Stadium | Greg McCallum | 41,560 |

=== Chart ===
Qualifying final
2 | St. George | 16
3 | Illawarra | 18
4 | Newcastle | 21
5 | Western Suburbs | 2

Major semi-final
1 | Brisbane | 22
Illawarra | 12
Minor semi-final
St. George | 3
Newcastle | 2

Preliminary final
Illawarra | 0
St. George | 4

Grand final
Brisbane | 28
St. George | 8

=== Grand final ===
In just their fifth year in the competition, Brisbane finally put together the right combination to reach the grand final. Their big names in Allan Langer, twins Kevin and Kerrod Walters, Steve Renouf, Michael Hancock and Glenn Lazarus had been unstoppable all year and helped the club power their way straight through to the finals as minor premiers, losing just four games in the regular season, and easily winning their only semi-final. This meant the Broncos went into the grand final as runaway favourites.

The 1992 grand final was played on the afternoon of Sunday, 27 September at the Sydney Football Stadium before a crowd of 41,560. For the pre-match entertainment, Debbie Byrne sang I Still Call Australia Home in a duet with the late Peter Allen, thanks to video on the big screen. Yothu Yindi also performed, and Jodie Gillies sang the national anthem.

| Brisbane Broncos | Position | St. George Dragons |
|---|---|---|
| 1. Julian O'Neill | FB | 1. Mick Potter |
| 2. Michael Hancock | WG | 2. Ricky Walford |
| 3. Steve Renouf | CE | 3. Mark Coyne |
| 4. Chris Johns | CE | 4. Michael Beattie (c) |
| 5. Willie Carne | WG | 5. Ian Herron |
| 6. Kevin Walters | FE | 6. Peter Coyne |
| 7. Allan Langer (c) | HB | 7. Noel Goldthorpe |
| 8. Glenn Lazarus | PR | 8. Tony Priddle |
| 9. Kerrod Walters | HK | 9. Wayne Collins |
| 10. Gavin Allen | PR | 10. Neil Tierney |
| 11. Trevor Gillmeister | SR | 11. David Barnhill |
| 12. Alan Cann | SR | 12. Scott Gourley |
| 13. Terry Matterson | LK | 13. Jeff Hardy |
| 15. Tony Currie | Bench | 14. Brad Mackay |
| 20. John Plath | Bench | 15. Rex Terp |
| 21. Andrew Gee | Bench | 19. Tony Smith |
| 22. Mark Hohn | Bench | 21. Matt Elliott |
| Wayne Bennett | Coach | Brian Smith |

Referee Greg McCallum blew time on and, early in the first half, St. George came very close to scoring first when Ricky Walford dived over in the corner, but had only just slipped into touch. Around the ten-minute mark, Brisbane were on the attack when, on the last tackle, Allan Langer cleverly stepped and passed inside to Gavin Allen who charged at the line. Allen drew the defence before flicking the ball back to the little half off the head of the Dragons fullback Mick Potter. Langer then nipped in to score untouched between the posts. Terry Matterson kicked the simplest of conversions to make it 6–0 in favour of the Broncos.

The Dragons hit back about five minutes later when Scott Gourley charged from just within his own half and produced a remarkable off-load for Michael Beattie in support, who then passed it out for Walford to race off and score in the right-hand corner. Ian Herron hooked the conversion attempt wide, so Brisbane remained in the lead at 6–4. Both sides then came close to scoring from kicks but no further points were posted before half-time.

In the second half, the Broncos ran away with the game. About ten minutes after the break, following a scrum win close to the Dragons’ try-line, Langer scurried through the defence from dummy-half and reached out to put the ball down. Matterson kicked the extras and Brisbane's lead was now 12–4. A few minutes later, they scored again when, from about thirty metres out, the Broncos again decided to run on the fifth tackle, the ball reaching Alan Cann who beat several defenders to ground the ball before celebrating the try by throwing it down, inadvertently into the forehead of an exhausted and demoralised Potter. Matterson once again kicked the extras to give Brisbane an 18–4 lead.

Around the midpoint of the second half, after Willie Carne did well to return a kick from his own in-goal area to get back into the field of play before being tackled, the Broncos decided to swing the ball left, out to centre Steve Renouf, who outpaced Walford on a 90-metre run to the try-line. This try became a defining moment in the game, the Broncos' season and Renouf’s career. Matterson missed the conversion attempt so the score remained at 22–4. About five minutes later, Cann scored a second try when he ran from over twenty metres out, stepping past tired and lazy defence to score untouched. The extras were kicked successfully this time by Matterson, giving the Bronocos a lead of 28–4.

In the seventy-ninth minute, St. George got a consolation try when Gourley crossed in the right corner and as the full-time siren sounded. Herron's kick from the sideline was unsuccessful, leaving the final score Brisbane 28, St. George 8.

Brisbane Broncos 28
Tries: Langer 2, Cann 2, Renouf
Goals: Matterson 4/5

St. George Dragons 8
Tries: Walford, Gourley
Goals: Herron 0/2

For Langer to play as he did, after a week of hearing how St George must stop him, confirms he deserves to be talked about with Peter Sterling and Wally Lewis as one of the three best players of the past decade.

— The Sydney Morning Herald, 27 April 1992

The win enabled Brisbane captain Allan Langer, in his first year in the role, to hoist the Winfield Cup and bring the trophy and title back to Queensland. As a result of his two-try performance, Langer also became the first Queenslander to be awarded the Clive Churchill Medal. Brisbane thus became the second non-New South Wales team to win the premiership after the Canberra Raiders’ previous victories in 1989 and 1990.

== Player statistics ==
The following statistics are as of the conclusion of Round 22.

Top 5 point scorers

| Points | Player | Tries | Goals | Field goals |
|---|---|---|---|---|
| 168 | Daryl Halligan | 7 | 70 | 0 |
| 164 | Eion Crossan | 3 | 76 | 0 |
| 146 | John Schuster | 4 | 65 | 0 |
| 142 | Terry Matterson | 2 | 67 | 0 |
| 118 | Ryan Girdler | 8 | 43 | 0 |

Top 5 try scorers

| Tries | Player |
|---|---|
| 16 | Mark Bell |
| 16 | Tim Brasher |
| 11 | Steve Renouf |
| 11 | Ricky Walford |
| 11 | Will Robinson |
| 11 | Brett Mullins |
| 11 | Manoa Thompson |

Top 5 goal scorers

| Goals | Player |
|---|---|
| 76 | Eion Crossan |
| 70 | Daryl Halligan |
| 67 | Terry Matterson |
| 65 | John Schuster |
| 50 | Jason Taylor |
| 50 | Matthew Ridge |

== Great Britain Lions Tour ==
The 1992 Great Britain Lions tour of Australasia was a tour by the Great Britain national rugby league team, nicknamed the 'Lions', of Papua New Guinea, Australia and New Zealand which took place between May and July 1992. The tour was the last of such length undertaken by the Great Britain team, and included a test match against Papua New Guinea, a three-test series against Australia for The Ashes, and a two-test series against New Zealand for the Baskerville Shield, all interspersed with matches against local club and representative teams.

The British team was coached by two-time premiership winner with Manly-Warringah, Mal Reilly, who had toured as a player in 1970 and was coach of the 1988 team. The team captain was Ellery Hanley who was making his third Lions tour as a player, though injury to Hanley would see the Lions captained by Garry Schofield in The Ashes tests.

Taking place following the conclusion of England's 1991–92 Rugby Football League season and during Australia's 1992 Winfield Cup premiership season, the tour led to friction between the Great Britain team's management and the Australian Rugby League over match scheduling and promotion. For the first time ever, a Lions tour was shown live on television in the United Kingdom through Sky Sports. The commentators for the tour were Eddie Hemmings and former Lions World Cup hooker Mike Stephenson who had a greater insight into the Australian game having spent most of the 1970s and 1980s, playing, coaching and commentating in the Sydney premiership. The Lions finished the tour with thirteen wins and four losses and a profit of £244,645. Unfortunately for the Lions, three of their losses came in the Test matches, two against Australia and one against New Zealand with the other loss coming against Sydney club side Parramatta.

| Game | Date | Result | Venue | Attendance |
|---|---|---|---|---|
| 1 | 2 June | Great Britain Lions def. Queensland Residents 14–10 | Townsville Sports Reserve, Townsville | 4,181 |
| 2 | 6 June | Great Britain Lions def. Canberra Raiders 24–12 | Bruce Stadium, Canberra | 4,728 |
| 3 | 9 June | Great Britain Lions def. Illawarra Steelers 11–10 | Steelers Stadium, Wollongong | 9,500 |
| 4 | 12 June | Australia def. Great Britain 22–6 | Sydney Football Stadium, Sydney | 40,141 |
| 5 | 16 June | Great Britain Lions def. NSW Country 24–6 | Pioneer Oval, Parkes | 8,014 |
| 6 | 19 June | Parramatta Eels def. Great Britain Lions 26–12 | Parramatta Stadium, Sydney | 18,220 |
| 7 | 23 June | Great Britain Lions def. Newcastle Knights 22–0 | Marathon Stadium, Newcastle | 9,758 |
| 8 | 26 June | Great Britain def. Australia 33–10 | Princes Park, Melbourne | 31,005 |
| 9 | 30 June | Great Britain Lions def. Gold Coast Seagulls 28–10 | Seagulls Stadium, Tweed Heads | 6,700 |
| 10 | 3 July | Australia def. Great Britain 16–10 | Lang Park, Brisbane | 32,313 |

== World Club Challenge ==
On 31 October the Broncos travelled to England to play in the World Club Challenge against British champions, Wigan. Brisbane became the first team since 1975's premiers, Eastern Suburbs, to defeat the English champions, and the first to do so on English soil, winning the match 22 - 8 in front of 17,460 spectators.

== Attendances ==
The regular season attendances for the 1992 season aggregated to a total of 2,282,194 at an average of 12,540 per game. Each of the top ten most attended games of the season were home games for either the Brisbane Broncos or the Newcastle Knights, with the two highest attended games featuring both clubs.

The highest ten regular season match attendances:

| Crowd | Venue | Home team | Opponent | Round |
|---|---|---|---|---|
| 28,828 | Lang Park | Brisbane Broncos | Newcastle Knights | Round 21 |
| 28,821 | Marathon Stadium | Newcastle Knights | Brisbane Broncos | Round 6 |
| 25,867 | Lang Park | Brisbane Broncos | Manly-Warringah Sea Eagles | Round 20 |
| 24,902 | Lang Park | Brisbane Broncos | Balmain Tigers | Round 12 |
| 24,884 | Marathon Stadium | Newcastle Knights | Manly-Warringah Sea Eagles | Round 2 |
| 24,192 | Lang Park | Brisbane Broncos | Canberra Raiders | Round 1 |
| 23,906 | Lang Park | Brisbane Broncos | Eastern Suburbs Roosters | Round 14 |
| 23,617 | Marathon Stadium | Newcastle Knights | Canberra Raiders | Round 22 |
| 23,192 | Lang Park | Brisbane Broncos | Gold Coast Seagulls | Round 2 |
| 22,258 | Marathon Stadium | Newcastle Knights | Penrith Panthers | Round 17 |

== See also ==
- 1992 State of Origin series
