= Greg Carberry =

Australian rugby league footballer

Personal information
- Full name: Greg Carberry
- Born: 12 February 1966 (age 59); Wollongong, New South Wales, Australia
- Height: 190 cm (6 ft 3 in)
- Weight: 83 kg (13 st 1 lb)

Playing information
- Position: Wing, Centre
Club
Years	Team	Pld	T	G	FG	P
1987–90	Illawarra Steelers	11	1	13	0	30
1991	Cronulla Sharks	14	5	33	0	86
	Total	25	6	46	0	116

Greg Carberry (born 12 February 1966) is an Australian former professional rugby league footballer who played in the 1980s and 1990s. Carberry played for the Illawarra Steelers and Cronulla Sharks in the NSWRL competition. His position of choice was wing.

== Playing career ==
A Wollongong junior, Carberry was graded by the Illawarra Steelers in 1985. He made his first grade debut from the bench in his side's 32−12 victory over the Western Suburbs Magpies at Campbelltown Stadium in round 9 of the 1987 season. Carberry played 4 seasons at the Steelers before departing the club at the end of the 1990 season.

In 1991, Carberry signed with the Cronulla Sharks and played 14 games with the club. However, at the end of the 1991 season, Carberry was told by the Sharks that his services were no longer required due to the club’s financial problems, and although he was only 26 years of age, no club sought Carberry’s services for 1992, and Carberry promptly retired at the end of the 1991 season. In total, Carberry played 25 games, and scored 6 tries, and kicked 46 goals.
