= Eion Crossan =

NZ rugby footballer

Personal information
- Born: 10 May 1967 (age 59) New Zealand

Playing information

Rugby union
- Position: Fullback
Club
| Years | Team | Pld | T | G | FG | P |
|---|---|---|---|---|---|---|
| 1987–1990 | Southland | 36 | 6 | 148 | | 409 |
| 1990–1991 | Bay of Plenty | 28 | 1 | 62 | | 389 |
| 1996–1996 | Southland | 13 | 3 | 23 | | 74 |
| | Total | 77 | 10 | 233 | 0 | 872 |

Rugby league
- Position: Wing
Club
| Years | Team | Pld | T | G | FG | P |
|---|---|---|---|---|---|---|
| 1992–93 | South Sydney | 22 | 3 | 76 | 0 | 164 |
| 1994–95 | Cronulla Sharks | 23 | 8 | 64 | 0 | 160 |
| | Total | 45 | 11 | 140 | 0 | 324 |

Eion Crossan (born 10 May 1967 in New Zealand) is a New Zealand former Rugby Footballer who played Rugby Union for Southland and Bay of Plenty between 1987 and 1996, and Rugby League for the South Sydney Rabbitohs and Cronulla-Sutherland Sharks between 1992 and 1995.

== Playing career ==
=== Rugby Union ===
Crosson played 49 games for Southland and 28 games for Bay of Plenty between 1987 and 1996.

He scored all 12 points (4 penalty goals) for Southland in their victory over the 1989 French tourists.

=== Rugby League ===
He played rugby league between 1992 and 1995 in the ARL competition. During this time he played for the South Sydney Rabbitohs and Cronulla-Sutherland Sharks.

He was well renowned as an accurate goal kicker at the time, and finished the 1992 season kicking 76/97 (78.35%) which was not far behind fellow Kiwi union converts and "Superboots" Daryl Halligan (North Sydney) and Manly-Warringah's Matthew Ridge.

During a Charity Shield game, playing for Souths, he had his nose broken by Dragons player David Barnhill.

1993 saw Crossan playing reserve grade for South Sydney, despite the Rabbitohs struggling in First Grade only winning 6 games all season. Unfortunately for Crossan, playing Reserve Grade and not being able to break back into the top grade despite their woeful season, effectively ended his chances of selection for the 1993 New Zealand tour of Great Britain and France.

In 1994 he switched to Cronulla-Sutherland which briefly revived his First Grade career. Crossan played 22 games for the Sharks in 1994, crossing for 8 tries though his kicking dipped only landing 61/98 (62.24%). However, with the emergence of goal kicking winger Mat Rogers, the son of Sharks legend Steve Rogers, Crossan again found himself playing mostly Reserve Grade in 1995, only making a single first grade appearance.

Following the 1995 ARL season, Crossan switched back to playing rugby union for Southland.

In the NSWRL/ARL, Eion Crossan scored a total of 324 points, including kicking 140/199 goals at 70.35%. He also scored 11 tries, 3 for South Sydney and 8 for Cornulla.
