= 1995 Cronulla-Sutherland Sharks season =

- ARL rank: 4th
- 1995 record: Wins: 16; draws: 0; losses: 8
- Points scored: For: 554 (96 tries, 84 goals, 2 field goals); against: 330 (60 tries, 44 goals, 2 field goals)

Team information
- Coach: John Lang
- Captain: Andrew Ettingshausen Mitch Healey
- Stadium: Caltex Field
- Avg. attendance: 11,901

Top scorers
- Tries: Mat Rogers (14)
- Goals: Mat Rogers (68)
- Points: Mat Rogers (192)
| ← 1994 | 1996 → |

The 1995 Cronulla-Sutherland Sharks season was the 29th in the club's history. They competed in the ARL's 1995 Winfield Cup premiership.

== Ladder ==
| | Team | Pld | W | D | L | PF | PA | PD | Pts |
|---|---|---|---|---|---|---|---|---|---|
| 1 | Manly | 22 | 20 | 0 | 2 | 687 | 248 | +439 | 40 |
| 2 | Canberra | 22 | 20 | 0 | 2 | 634 | 255 | +379 | 40 |
| 3 | Brisbane | 22 | 17 | 0 | 5 | 600 | 364 | +236 | 34 |
| 4 | Cronulla | 22 | 16 | 0 | 6 | 516 | 287 | +229 | 32 |
| 5 | Newcastle | 22 | 15 | 0 | 7 | 549 | 396 | +153 | 30 |
| 6 | Sydney Bulldogs | 22 | 14 | 0 | 8 | 468 | 352 | +116 | 28 |
| 7 | St. George | 22 | 13 | 0 | 9 | 583 | 382 | +201 | 26 |
| 8 | North Sydney | 22 | 11 | 2 | 9 | 542 | 331 | +211 | 24 |
| 9 | Sydney City | 22 | 12 | 0 | 10 | 466 | 406 | +60 | 24 |
| 10 | Auckland | 22 | 13 | 0 | 9 | 544 | 493 | +51 | 24 |
| 11 | Western Reds | 22 | 11 | 0 | 11 | 361 | 549 | -188 | 22 |
| 12 | Illawarra | 22 | 10 | 1 | 11 | 519 | 431 | +88 | 21 |
| 13 | Western Suburbs | 22 | 10 | 0 | 12 | 459 | 534 | -75 | 20 |
| 14 | Penrith | 22 | 9 | 0 | 13 | 481 | 484 | -3 | 18 |
| 15 | Sydney Tigers | 22 | 7 | 0 | 15 | 309 | 591 | -282 | 14 |
| 16 | South Queensland | 22 | 6 | 1 | 15 | 303 | 502 | -199 | 13 |
| 17 | Gold Coast | 22 | 4 | 1 | 17 | 350 | 628 | -278 | 9 |
| 18 | South Sydney | 22 | 4 | 1 | 17 | 319 | 686 | -367 | 9 |
| 19 | Parramatta | 22 | 3 | 0 | 19 | 310 | 690 | -380 | 6 |
| 20 | North Queensland | 22 | 2 | 0 | 20 | 269 | 660 | -391 | 4 |

- Auckland Warriors were stripped of 2 competition points due to exceeding the replacement limit in round 3.
