= List of Manly Warringah Sea Eagles players =

This article lists all rugby league players who have played first-grade for the Manly Warringah Sea Eagles in the National Rugby League.

Notes:

- Debut:
  - Players are listed in the order of their debut game with the club.
  - If multiple players made their debut in the same game, the numbers have been allocated alphabetically.
- Appearances: Manly Sea Eagles games only, not a total of their career games. For example, Brent Kite has played a career total of 313 first-grade games but of those, 221 were at Manly.
- Previous Club: refers to the previous first-grade rugby league club (NRL or Super League) the player played at and does not refer to any junior club, Rugby Union club or a rugby league club he was signed to but never played at.
- The statistics in this table are correct as of round 12 of the 2026 NRL season.

== List of players ==
Cap no.	Name	Nationality	Manly career	Debut round	Previous club	Appearances	Tries	Goals	Field goals	Points
1.	Johnny Bliss	(Australia)	1947–53	Rd. 1	North Sydney Bears	76	41	0	0	123
2.	Mackie Campbell	(Australia)	1947	Rd. 1	Debut	6	2	0	0	6
3.	Ern Cannon	(Australia)	1947	Rd. 1	Debut	1	0	0	0	0
4.	Bert Collins	(Australia)	1947–49	Rd. 1	North Sydney Bears	16	3	8	0	25
5.	Merv Gillmer	(Australia)	1947–49	Rd. 1	Debut	21	2	38	0	82
6.	Harry Grew	(Australia)	1947	Rd. 1	Western Suburbs Magpies	13	2	0	0	6
7.	James Hall	(Australia)	1947	Rd. 1	North Sydney Bears	3	0	0	0	0
8.	Pat Hines	(Australia)	1947	Rd. 1	Debut	6	0	0	0	0
9.	Keith Kirkwood	(Australia)	1947–50	Rd. 1	North Sydney Bears	61	14	0	0	42
10.	Gary Maddrell	(Australia)	1947	Rd. 1	Debut	7	1	0	0	3
11.	Cyril McMahon	(Australia)	1947–50	Rd. 1	North Sydney Bears	35	17	48	0	147
12.	Jim Walsh	(Australia)	1947-49	Rd. 1	Debut	17	9	0	0	27
13.	Max Whitehead	(Australia)	1947–48	Rd. 1	Debut	20	4	0	0	12
14.	Ted Dawes	(Australia)	1947	Rd. 2	Newtown Jets	4	0	0	0	0
15.	Angus Kellock	(Australia)	1947–55	Rd. 2	Debut	23	0	74	0	148
16.	Gordon Willoughby	(Australia)	1947–54	Rd. 2	Debut	130	60	0	0	180
17.	Roy Bull	(Australia)	1947–59	Rd. 3	Debut	177	25	0	0	75
18.	Fred Burge	(Australia)	1947	Rd. 3	Debut	1	0	0	0	0
19.	Dick Allerton	(Australia)	1947	Rd. 4	North Sydney Bears	3	0	0	0	0
20.	Eric Bathgate	(Australia)	1947–50	Rd. 6	North Sydney Bears	19	0	5	0	10
21.	Arthur Dawes	(Australia)	1947	Rd. 6	North Sydney Bears	11	0	0	0	0
22.	Don Matheson	(Australia)	1947–50	Rd. 6	Debut	20	4	1	0	14
23.	Charles Robinson	(Australia)	1947–48	Rd. 6	Debut	20	3	10	0	29
24.	Tom Jensen	(Australia)	1947	Rd. 8	Debut	6	1	0	0	3
25.	Ron Smith	(Australia)	1947	Rd. 8	Debut	15	0	0	0	0
26.	Ron Beaumont	(Australia)	1947–53	Rd. 9	Debut	115	3	3	0	15
27.	Jack Hubbard	(Australia)	1947–56	Rd. 11	Debut	116	31	0	0	93
28.	Eddie Robinson	(Australia)	1947–48	Rd. 13	Debut	8	0	5	0	10
29.	Ray Black	(Australia)	1947–50	Rd. 14	Debut	29	5	0	0	15
30.	Bob Jones	(Australia)	1947	Rd. 15	Debut	2	0	0	0	0
31.	Ritchie Burke	(Australia)	1947–50	Rd. 17	Debut	10	5	0	0	15
32.	Len Johnson	(Australia)	1947–49, 1952–53	Rd. 17	Debut	46	0	0	0	0
33.	Fred Brown	(Australia)	1948–53	Rd. 1	Debut	106	19	0	0	57
34.	Brian Horne	(Australia)	1948–50	Rd. 1	Debut	8	1	13	0	29
35.	Neil McDonnell	(Australia)	1948	Rd. 1	Debut	19	2	5	0	16
36.	Ron O'Connell	(Australia)	1948	Rd. 1	Eastern Suburbs Roosters	11	1	0	0	3
37.	Geoff Trueman	(Australia)	1948	Rd. 3	Debut	3	0	0	0	0
38.	Basil Neal	(Australia)	1948	Rd. 5	Debut	1	1	0	0	3
39.	Arthur Kerle	(Australia)	1948	Rd. 6	Debut	4	0	0	0	0
40.	Keith Beardsmore	(Australia)	1948–49	Rd. 8	Debut	7	1	0	0	3
41.	Steve Raffo	(Australia)	1948–49	Rd. 8	Debut	11	2	0	0	6
42.	Bill Abbott	(Australia)	1948	Rd. 12	Debut	2	0	0	0	0
43.	Alf Barrett	(Australia)	1948–52	Rd. 12	Debut	20	3	0	0	9
44.	John Campbell	(Australia)	1948	Rd. 12	Debut	5	1	0	0	3
45.	Jack Dunford	(Australia)	1948	Rd. 12	Debut	2	0	0	0	0
46.	Sandy Herbert	(Australia)	1948–53	Rd. 15	Debut	60	5	0	0	15
47.	George Hunter	(Australia)	1949–58	Rd. 1	Debut	126	23	0	0	69
48.	Len Walton	(Australia)	1949	Rd. 1	Debut	8	0	6	0	12
49.	Jimmy Weir	(Australia)	1949–50	Rd. 1	Debut	2	0	0	0	0
50.	Neville Pierce	(Australia)	1949–53	Rd. 7	Debut	24	5	0	0	15
51.	Doug Smith	(Australia)	1949	Rd. 14	Debut	1	0	0	0	0
52.	Syd Fischer	(Australia)	1949–52	Rd. 15	Debut	6	0	2	0	4
53.	Reuben Hudson	(Australia)	1949–54	Rd. 18	Debut	5	0	0	0	0
54.	Jack Fields	(Australia)	1950–53	Rd. 1	Debut	11	0	0	0	0
55.	Perce Pritchard	(Australia)	1950–51	Rd. 1	Debut	17	2	1	0	8
56.	Ron Rowles	(Australia)	1950–54	Rd. 1	Debut	81	46	352	0	842
57.	Kevin Schubert	(Australia)	1950–56	Rd. 1	Debut	82	2	0	0	6
58.	Phil Flynn	(Australia)	1950	Rd. 6	Debut	2	0	0	0	0
59.	Ken Arthurson	(Australia)	1950–52	Rd. 9	Debut	41	14	0	0	42
60.	Bob Grimm	(Australia)	1950–56	Rd. 9	Debut	34	4	1	0	14
61.	Barry O'Brien	(Australia)	1950–56	Rd. 9	Debut	8	0	0	0	0
62.	Warren Simmons	(Australia)	1950-55	Rd. 15	Debut	37	11	0	0	33
63.	Jim Sullivan	(Australia)	1950–52	Rd. 18	Debut	23	4	0	0	12
64.	Wally O'Connell	(Australia)	1951–52	Rd. 1	Eastern Suburbs Roosters	34	11	0	0	33
65.	George Kempshall	(Australia)	1951–53	Rd. 5	Debut	13	2	0	0	6
66.	Jack Lumsden	(Australia)	1951–72	Rd. 5	Debut	26	21	12	0	87
67.	Hilton Kidd	(Australia)	1951	Rd. 6	Balmain Tigers	1	0	0	0	0
68.	John Hobbs	(Australia)	1952–56	Rd. 9	Debut	73	19	1	0	59
69.	Reg Morton	(Australia)	1952–53	Rd. 10	Debut	10	0	0	0	0
70.	Brian Staunton	(Australia)	1952–54	Rd. 13	Debut	25	5	0	0	15
71.	Dick Windshuttle	(Australia)	1952	Rd. 14	Debut	2	0	0	0	0
72.	Mervyn McCann	(Australia)	1952–53	Rd. 16	Debut	6	2	0	0	6
73.	Les Ryanhart	(Australia)	1952	Rd. 17	Debut	2	0	0	0	0
74.	Alan Walker	(Australia)	1952	Rd. 18	Debut	1	0	0	0	0
75.	George Hugo	(Australia)	1952–63	Playoff	Debut	99	38	0	0	114
76.	Ted Harding	(Australia)	1953	Rd. 1	Debut	1	0	0	0	0
77.	Jack McIntosh	(Australia)	1953	Rd. 1	Balmain Tigers	7	0	0	0	0
78.	Jack Perrin	(Australia)	1953	Rd. 1	Eastern Suburbs Roosters	18	11	0	0	33
79.	Johnny Tenison	(Australia)	1953–57	Rd. 1	Debut	41	17	0	0	51
80.	Rex Bailey	(Australia)	1953	Rd. 3	Debut	14	1	0	0	3
81.	Ray Ebb	(Australia)	1953	Rd. 3	Debut	2	1	5	0	13
82.	Vic Emerton	(Australia)	1953	Rd. 3	Debut	1	2	0	0	6
83.	Allan Batty	(Australia)	1953–58	Rd. 5	Debut	25	0	16	1	34
84.	Reg Curran	(Australia)	1953–54	Rd. 6	South Sydney Rabbitohs	28	3	1	0	11
85.	Jim Peebles	(Australia)	1953–61	Rd. 13	Debut	46	9	0	0	27
86.	Arthur Sullivan	(Australia)	1953	Rd. 14	Debut	2	4	0	0	12
87.	Martin Henry Jackson	(Australia)	1953–56	Rd. 17	Debut	40	5	0	0	15
88.	Roy Barnett	(Australia)	1953	Rd. 18	Debut	1	0	0	0	3
89.	Roy Dykes	(Australia)	1954–55	Rd. 1	Balmain Tigers	9	2	0	0	6
90.	Kevin Fleming	(Australia)	1954–56	Rd. 1	Debut	15	1	0	0	3
91.	Rees Duncan	(Australia)	1954–56	Rd. 2	Debut	54	16	9	0	66
92.	Norm Bertrand	(Australia)	1954–56	Rd. 4	Debut	23	2	0	0	6
93.	Glenn Thorpe	(Australia)	1954–55	Rd. 4	Debut	16	4	0	0	12
94.	John Chapple	(Australia)	1954	Rd. 11	Debut	7	7	0	0	21
95.	Kevin Diett	(Australia)	1954–58	Rd. 12	Debut	56	15	3	0	51
96.	Bernie Seymour	(Australia)	1954–63	Rd. 12	Debut	45	2	0	0	6
97.	John Maher	(Australia)	1954	Unknown	Debut	?	0	0	0	0
98.	Doug Daley	(Australia)	1955–61	Rd. 1	Debut	63	7	0	0	21
99.	George Lenon	(Australia)	1955–60	Rd. 1	Debut	75	0	0	0	0
100.	William Lloyd	(Australia)	1955–60	Rd. 1	Debut	87	18	0	0	54
101.	Eddie Lumsden	(Australia)	1955	Rd. 1	Debut	4	1	0	0	3
102.	Eric Page	(Australia)	1955–57	Rd. 2	Debut	9	2	0	0	6
103.	Peter Burke	(Australia)	1955–63	Rd. 15	Debut	105	20	0	0	60
104.	Ray Ritchie	(Australia)	1955–59	Rd. 16	Debut	49	37	0	0	111
105.	Rex Mossop	(Australia)	1956–63	Rd. 1	Debut	129	11	0	0	33
106.	Ron Willey	(Australia)	1956–62	Rd. 1	Canterbury Bulldogs	124	20	447	2	958
107.	Erwin Noffz	(Australia)	1956	Rd. 8	North Sydney Bears	9	0	0	0	0
108.	Bill Garvin	(Australia)	1957	Rd. 1	Balmain Tigers	6	0	0	0	0
109.	Denis Meaney	(Australia)	1957–59	Rd. 1	Debut	41	6	0	0	18
110.	Ray Quinnell	(Australia)	1957–61	Rd. 1	Debut	62	11	0	0	33
111.	Bill Delamere	(Australia)	1957–64	Rd. 6	Debut	41	6	0	0	18
112.	Norm Twight	(Australia)	1957–58	Rd. 6	North Sydney Bears	6	2	0	0	6
113.	Ronnie Woods	(Australia)	1957–63	Rd. 7	Debut	24	0	0	0	0
114.	Larry Maloney	(Australia)	1957–59	Rd. 8	Debut	12	3	0	0	9
115.	Bobby Lenon	(Australia)	1957–61	Rd. 12	Debut	26	5	0	0	15
116.	Graham Frost	(Australia)	1957–58	Rd. 14	Debut	5	0	0	0	0
117.	Noel Boland	(Australia)	1957	Rd. 15	Debut	3	1	0	0	3
118.	Peter Diversi	(Australia)	1958–62	Rd. 1	North Sydney Bears	67	8	4	0	32
119.	Kevin Mosman	(Australia)	1958–59	Rd. 4	Balmain Tigers	25	5	0	0	15
120.	Peter Horne	(Australia)	1958	Rd. 6	Debut	2	0	0	0	0
121.	Alf Madden	(Australia)	1958–59	Rd. 11	North Sydney Bears	18	3	1	0	11
122.	Robert Bartlett	(Australia)	1958–59	Rd. 9	Leeds Rhinos	3	0	0	0	0
123.	Bob Wright	(Australia)	1959	Rd. 3	Debut	1	1	0	0	3
124.	Len Wadling	(Australia)	1959–63	Rd. 4	Parramatta Eels	30	19	0	0	57
125.	Bob Batty	(Australia)	1959–71	Rd. 7	Debut	196	40	502	15	1154
126.	Brian Allsop	(Australia)	1960–64	Rd. 1	Eastern Suburbs Roosters	74	36	0	0	108
127.	Barney McEvoy	(Australia)	1960–63	Rd. 1	North Sydney Bears	59	16	0	0	48
128.	Terry McGovern	(Australia)	1960–61	Rd. 1	Newtown Jets	18	5	0	0	15
129.	Barry O'Connell	(Australia)	1960–64	Rd. 1	Debut	85	8	44	0	112
130.	George Mullins	(Australia)	1960	Rd. 14	Debut	4	0	0	0	0
131.	Ted Johnson	(Australia)	1960	Rd. 16	Debut	3	1	0	0	3
132.	Nick Yakich	(Australia)	1960–66	Rd. 16	Debut	74	52	0	0	156
133.	Bernie Cuneo	(Australia)	1961–63	Rd. 1	North Sydney Bears	33	1	0	0	3
134.	Kevin Negus	(Australia)	1961	Rd. 1	Debut	11	0	0	0	0
135.	Jack Sinclair	(Australia)	1961–64	Rd. 1	Balmain Tigers	49	13	0	0	39
136.	Frank Stanton	(Australia)	1961–69	Rd. 1	Debut	129	21	0	3	69
137.	Bob Thomson	(Australia)	1961–63	Rd. 1	Debut	28	4	0	0	12
138.	Fred Jones	(Australia)	1961–75	Rd. 12	Debut	241	25	0	1	77
139.	Barry Hall	(Australia)	1962	Rd. 1	North Sydney Bears	11	2	0	0	6
140.	Fred Nelson	(Australia)	1962	Rd. 1	South Sydney Rabbitohs	14	3	0	0	9
141.	Alan Scott	(Australia)	1962–64	Rd. 1	South Sydney Rabbitohs	24	4	0	0	12
142.	Neil Bertoli	(Australia)	1962	Rd. 17	Debut	1	0	0	0	0
143.	Tony Paskins	(Australia)	1963–64	Rd. 1	Eastern Suburbs Roosters	16	0	4	0	8
144.	Doug Walkaden	(Australia)	1963–66	Rd. 1	Debut	54	4	0	0	12
145.	Fred Yakich	(Australia)	1963–66	Rd. 1	Debut	40	14	0	0	42
146.	Ross Everingham	(Australia)	1963	Rd. 2	Debut	9	2	0	0	6
147.	Athol Preston	(Australia)	1963	Rd. 3	Debut	12	0	0	0	0
148.	John Morgan	(Australia)	1963–70	Rd. 4	Debut	113	21	0	0	63
149.	Pat Byrne	(Australia)	1963–64	Rd. 8	Debut	11	1	3	0	9
150.	Rob Cameron	(Australia)	1963–72	Rd. 11	Debut	87	16	0	0	48
151.	Jock Butterfield	(New Zealand)	1964	Rd. 1	Debut	10	0	0	0	0
152.	Mal Condon	(Australia)	1964	Rd. 1	Debut	7	1	0	0	3
153.	Alec Tennant	(Australia)	1964–70	Rd. 1	Debut	75	31	0	0	93
154.	Fred Pickup	(Australia)	1964–65	Rd. 2	Debut	18	4	0	0	12
155.	Garry Toole	(Australia)	1964–68	Rd. 2	Debut	29	0	0	0	0
156.	Bill Bradstreet	(Australia)	1964–73	Rd. 3	Debut	102	28	33	0	150
157.	George Smith	(Australia)	1964–65	Rd. 4	Debut	21	1	0	0	3
158.	Pat Kelly	(Australia)	1964–65	Rd. 7	Debut	13	0	0	0	0
159.	Trevor Kilkelly	(New Zealand)	1964	Rd. 9	Debut	5	0	0	0	0
160.	David Knox	(Australia)	1964–71	Rd. 9	Debut	60	0	3	0	6
161.	Mick Simmons	(Australia)	1964–67	Rd. 17	Debut	18	2	0	0	6
162.	Ken Day	(Australia)	1965–68	Rd. 1	Debut	69	4	0	1	14
163.	Mick Veivers	(Australia)	1965–69	Rd. 1	Debut	66	5	0	1	17
164.	Eddie Whiley	(Australia)	1965–71	Rd. 1	Debut	36	6	0	0	18
165.	Ian Foye	(Australia)	1965	Rd. 2	Balmain Tigers	3	0	0	0	0
166.	George McTaggart	(Australia)	1965–70	Rd. 3	Debut	36	5	0	0	15
167.	Peter Kelly	(Australia)	1965–66	Rd. 5	Balmain Tigers	4	0	2	0	4
168.	John McDonell	(Australia)	1965–67	Rd. 5	Debut	27	2	0	0	6
169.	Ken Romaine	(Australia)	1965	Rd. 8	Debut	2	0	0	0	0
170.	Bill Hamilton	(Australia)	1965–76	Rd. 9	Debut	187	19	0	0	57
171.	Rodney Shepherd	(Australia)	1965	Rd. 14	Debut	1	0	0	0	0
172.	Tony Antunac	(Australia)	1965–69	Rd. 15	Debut	20	2	0	0	6
173.	Bob Fulton	(Australia)	1966–76	Rd. 1	Debut	219	129	10	57	510
174.	Peter Gallagher	(Australia)	1966–68	Rd. 2	Eastern Suburbs Roosters	36	8	0	0	24
175.	Paul Gibson	(Australia)	1966	Rd. 8	South Sydney Rabbitohs	13	3	7	0	23
176.	Mick Bryant	(Australia)	1967–68	Rd. 1	Eastern Suburbs Roosters	12	4	0	0	12
177.	Les Hanigan	(Australia)	1967–72	Rd. 1	Debut	78	44	0	0	132
178.	Ron Murray	(Australia)	1967	Rd. 2	Debut	9	4	2	0	16
179.	Gary Collins	(Australia)	1967	Rd. 13	Debut	9	2	0	0	6
180.	Derek Moritz	(Australia)	1967–72	Rd. 14	Debut	53	24	74	0	220
181.	Billy Denoon	(Australia)	1968	Rd. 1	Debut	3	0	0	0	0
182.	Norm Pounder	(Australia)	1968–74	Rd. 1	Debut	86	5	0	0	15
183.	Dennis Ward	(Australia)	1968–72	Rd. 1	Canterbury Bulldogs	80	22	0	30	214
184.	Howard Whitaker	(Australia)	1968–70	Rd. 1	Debut	29	5	0	0	15
185.	Barry Pearson	(Australia)	1968	Rd. 8	Debut	3	0	0	0	0
186.	Bob Hardie	(Australia)	1968–71	Rd. 10	Debut	5	0	0	0	0
187.	Adrian Astorquia	(Australia)	1968–69	Rd. 18	Debut	3	0	0	0	0
188.	Roger Bilton	(Australia)	1968–69	Rd. 19	Debut	2	0	0	0	0
189.	Michael McLean	(Australia)	1968–71	Rd. 20	Debut	30	5	0	0	15
190.	Danny Gough	(Australia)	1969–70	Rd. 1	Debut	31	12	0	0	36
191.	John McDonald	(Australia)	1969–71	Rd. 1	Debut	66	30	2	1	96
192.	Allan Thomson	(Australia)	1969–72	Rd. 2	Debut	80	8	0	0	24
193.	Peter Peters	(Australia)	1969–74	Rd. 4	Parramatta Eels	73	14	19	0	80
194.	John Bucknall	(Australia)	1969–73	Rd. 9	Debut	35	2	0	0	6
195.	Ian Martin	(Australia)	1969–78	Rd. 17	Debut	159	34	0	0	102
196.	Max Krilich	(Australia)	1970–83	Rd. 1	Debut	215	31	39	1	173
197.	Terry Randall	(Australia)	1970–82	Rd. 3	Debut	208	21	0	1	65
198.	Lindsay Drake	(Australia)	1970–71, 1977–79	Rd. 19	Debut	23	7	0	0	21
199.	Keith Blackett	(Australia)	1970–72	Rd. 21	Debut	3	0	5	0	10
200.	Ken Irvine	(Australia)	1971–73	Rd. 1	North Sydney Bears	60	41	11	0	145
201.	Bob Moses	(Australia)	1971–73	Rd. 1	South Sydney Rabbitohs	14	5	0	0	15
202.	Mal Reilly	(England) (United Kingdom)	1971–75	Rd. 1	Castleford Tigers	89	13	1	0	41
203.	David McKenzie	(Australia)	1971	Rd. 9	Debut	2	0	0	0	0
204.	Graham Eadie	(Australia)	1971–83	Rd. 10	Debut	237	71	847	3	1981
205.	Graham Williams	. (England)	1971–74	Rd. 15	North Sydney Bears	17	6	0	1	19
206.	John O'Bryan	(Australia)	1971, 1975	Rd. 17	Debut	3	0	0	0	0
207.	Ron Sparkes	(Australia)	1971	Rd. 21	Debut	2	0	0	0	0
208.	Ray Branighan	(Australia)	1972–78	Rd. 1	South Sydney Rabbitohs	114	30	52	0	194
209.	John O'Neill	(Australia)	1972–74	Rd. 1	South Sydney Rabbitohs	51	3	0	0	9
210.	John Barber	(Australia)	1972–75	Rd. 2	Debut	25	1	2	0	7
211.	Bill Clare	(Australia)	1972–75	Rd. 4	Debut	18	10	0	0	30
212.	Gary Thoroughgood	(Australia)	1972–78	Rd. 5	Debut	80	12	0	0	36
213.	Alan Maddalena	(Australia)	1972–74	Rd. 8	Newtown Jets	14	4	0	0	12
214.	Max Brown	(Australia)	1972–75	Rd. 10	Canterbury Bulldogs	62	20	33	0	126
215.	Terry Hill	(Australia)	1972–76	Rd. 10	Debut	26	11	0	0	33
216.	Mark Willoughby	(Australia)	1972–81	Rd. 12	Debut	50	5	1	0	17
217.	Garry Train	(Australia)	1972	Rd. 16	Debut	2	0	0	0	0
218.	Johnny Mayes	(Australia)	1973	Rd. 1	Eastern Suburbs Roosters	24	16	0	1	49
219.	Alan Thompson	(Australia)	1973–84	Rd. 4	Debut	263	62	0	2	199
220.	Rod Jackson	(Australia)	1973–77	Rd. 7	Canterbury Bulldogs	62	23	0	0	69
221.	Warren Evans	(Australia)	1973	Rd. 16	North Sydney Bears	5	1	0	0	3
222.	John Payne	(Australia)	1973	Rd. 16	North Sydney Bears	1	0	0	0	0
223.	Kevin Junee	(Australia)	1974—75	Rd. 1	Eastern Suburbs Roosters	38	29	0	0	87
224.	Phil Lowe	(England) (United Kingdom)	1974–76	Rd. 1	Parramatta Eels	72	25	0	0	75
225.	Daryl Pierce	(Australia)	1974–80	Rd. 3	Debut	16	2	0	1	7
226.	Trevor Bailey	(Australia)	1974	Rd. 10	Debut	1	0	0	0	0
227.	Mick Waller	(Australia)	1974–76	Rd. 15	Debut	14	3	5	0	19
228.	Laurie Freier	(Australia)	1975	Rd. 1	Eastern Suburbs Roosters	9	0	0	0	0
229.	Tom Mooney	(Australia)	1975–81	Rd. 1	South Sydney Rabbitohs	163	83	0	0	249
230.	Russel Gartner	(Australia)	1975-81	Rd. 7	Debut	107	40	0	0	120
231.	Dempsey Joy	(Australia)	1975-77	Rd. 7	Debut	11	0	0	0	0
232.	Tony Buchan	(Australia)	1975	Unknown	Debut	1	0	0	0	0
233.	Steve Symonds	(Australia)	1975	Rd. 14	Debut	9	3	0	0	9
234.	John Harvey	(Australia)	1975–78, 1984	Rd. 15	Debut	74	3	0	0	10
235.	Bob Poole	(Australia)	1975	Unknown	Debut	1	0	0	0	0
236.	Chris Ryan	(Australia)	1975	Unknown	Debut	1	0	0	0	0
237.	Col Parkes	(Australia)	1976–77	Rd. 1	Debut	22	2	0	0	6
238.	Russell Hunter	(Australia)	1976–77	Rd. 5	Debut	7	0	0	0	0
239.	Ian Baker	(Australia)	1976	Rd. 7	Eastern Suburbs Roosters	12	0	0	0	0
240.	Steve Norton	(England) (United Kingdom)	1976–77	Rd. 8	Castleford Tigers	26	1	0	0	3
241.	Gary Stephens	(England) (United Kingdom)	1976–77	Rd. 8	Castleford Tigers	30	2	0	0	6
242.	Brian Wilson	(Australia)	1976	Rd. 12	Debut	4	0	0	0	0
243.	Peter Byrne	(Australia)	1976	Rd. 13	Newtown Jets	1	0	0	0	0
244.	John Gibbs	(Australia)	1976–81	Rd. 14	Debut	87	44	0	3	135
245.	Steve Watts	(Australia)	1976	Rd. 15	Debut	1	0	0	0	0
246.	Peter Cootes	(Australia)	1977	Rd. 1	Debut	1	0	0	0	0
247.	Robbie Parker	(Australia)	1977	Rd. 1	Debut	4	0	0	0	0
248.	Ian Thomson	(Australia)	1977–80, 1982–86	Rd. 1	Debut	115	14	0	0	44
249.	Wayne Springall	(Australia)	1977–81	Rd. 2	Debut	42	4	0	0	12
250.	Elwyn Walters	(Australia)	1977	Rd. 2	Eastern Suburbs Roosters	5	0	0	0	0
251.	David Adams	(Australia)	1977–79	Rd. 3	Debut	6	0	0	0	0
252.	Simon Booth	(Australia)	1977–82	Rd. 3	Debut	115	30	0	0	90
253.	Chris Montgomery	(Australia)	1977–79, 1981, 1983	Rd. 17	Debut	18	4	1	0	14
254.	John Gray	(England) (United Kingdom)	1978–80	Rd. 1	North Sydney Bears	50	4	68	0	148
255.	Ray Higgs	(Australia)	1978	Rd. 1	Parramatta Eels	8	1	0	0	3
256.	Stephen Knight	(Australia)	1978–79	Rd. 1	Balmain Tigers	32	10	0	0	30
257.	Bruce Walker	(Australia)	1978–83	Rd. 1	North Sydney Bears	85	14	0	0	42
258.	Mick Healey	(Australia)	1978	Rd. 2	Debut	2	0	0	0	0
259.	Steve Martin	(Australia)	1978–81	Rd. 5	Barrow Raiders	70	21	0	2	65
260.	Greg Cross	(Australia)	1978–79	Rd. 7	Debut	4	0	0	0	0
261.	Tony Ashworth	(Australia)	1978	Rd. 9	Debut	1	1	0	0	3
262.	Ed Planten	(Australia)	1978–82	Rd. 18	Debut	5	0	0	0	0
263.	Paul Vautin	(Australia)	1979–89	Rd. 1	Debut	204	20	2	2	74
264.	Martin Meredith	(Australia)	1979–87	Rd. 2	Debut	44	7	0	0	24
265.	Steve Merritt	(Australia)	1979–80	Rd. 2	Debut	5	0	0	0	0
266.	Ross Windshuttle	(Australia)	1979–84	Rd. 2	Debut	45	15	4	0	60
267.	Steve Cray	(Australia)	1979–80	Rd. 6	Debut	16	2	0	0	6
268.	Steve Lawler	(Australia)	1979	Rd. 6	Debut	1	0	0	0	0
269.	Michael Blake	(Australia)	1979–84	Rd. 18	Debut	66	24	0	0	80
270.	Martin Bull	(Australia)	1979	Rd. 21	Debut	1	0	0	0	0
271.	Greg Williams	(Australia)	1979–80	Rd. 21	Debut	2	0	0	0	0
272.	Les Boyd	(Australia)	1980–84	Rd. 1	Western Suburbs Magpies	75	14	0	0	45
273.	John Dorahy	(Australia)	1980–81	Rd. 1	Western Suburbs Magpies	27	6	19	1	57
274.	Rick Chisholm	(Australia)	1980–82, 1983–84	Rd. 2	Debut	31	9	8	7	50
275.	Ray Brown	(Australia)	1980–86	Rd. 3	Western Suburbs Magpies	92	4	0	0	14
276.	Jim See	(Australia)	1980	Rd. 4	Debut	4	0	0	0	0
277.	Fred Teasdell	(Australia)	1980–82	Rd. 12	Debut	18	5	0	0	15
278.	Mark Broadhurst	(New Zealand)	1981–82	Rd. 1	Debut	44	6	0	0	18
279.	Geoff Gerard	(Australia)	1981–84	Rd. 1	Parramatta Eels	85	4	0	0	13
280.	Michael Eden	(Australia)	1981–82	Rd. 4	Debut	22	2	72	0	150
281.	Warren Jowett	(Australia)	1981–84	Rd. 5	Debut	20	0	0	0	0
282.	Stuart Davis	(Australia)	1981–82, 1984–89	Rd. 11	Debut	98	39	0	0	148
283.	Chris Close	(Australia)	1982–87	Rd. 1	Debut	100	39	0	0	154
284.	Paul McCabe	(Australia)	1982–85	Rd. 1	Eastern Suburbs Roosters	69	14	0	0	47
285.	John Ribot	(Australia)	1982–83	Rd. 1	Western Suburbs Magpies	52	33	0	0	112
286.	Phil Carey	(Australia)	1982–84	Rd. 10	Debut	39	12	0	0	44
287.	Phil Blake	(Australia)	1982–86	Rd. 12	Debut	102	63	0	7	250
288.	Kerry Boustead	(Australia)	1983–86	Rd. 1	Eastern Suburbs Roosters	65	30	0	0	120
289.	Dave Brown	(Australia)	1983–84	Rd. 1	Eastern Suburbs Roosters	34	2	0	0	6
290.	Noel Cleal	(Australia)	1983–89	Rd. 1	Eastern Suburbs Roosters	128	43	10	0	192
291.	Phil Sigsworth	(Australia)	1983–84	Rd. 1	Newtown Jets	34	12	8	0	64
292.	Brett Atkins	(Australia)	1983–84	Rd. 3	Debut	13	0	0	0	0
293.	Glenn Ryan	(Australia)	1994	Rd. 6	Debut	86	6	0	0	24
294.	Col Drier	(Australia)	1983–84	Rd. 8	Debut	17	8	0	0	32
295.	Ian Schubert	(Australia)	1983–84	Rd. 8	Western Suburbs Magpies	29	3	0	0	12
296.	Larry McMillan	(Australia)	1983–86	Rd. 12	Debut	18	1	0	0	4
297.	Matthew Loft	(Australia)	1983–88	Rd. 19	Debut	15	0	0	0	0
298.	Wayne Honeywood	(Australia)	1983	Rd. 25	Debut	2	0	0	0	0
299.	Michael Lennon	(Australia)	1983–84	Rd. 26	Debut	3	0	0	0	0
300.	Des Hasler	(Australia)	1984–93, 1995–96	Rd. 22	Penrith Panthers	256	72	1	0	290
301.	Tony Melrose	(Australia)	1984–85	Rd. 1	South Sydney Rabbitohs	39	7	61	1	151
302.	Ian Barkley	(Australia)	1984–88	Rd. 2	Eastern Suburbs Roosters	26	6	0	0	24
303.	Steve Hegarty	(Australia)	1984–86	Rd. 2	Debut	24	4	56	1	129
304.	Mal Cochrane	(Australia)	1984–90	Rd. 7	Debut	118	19	167	0	410
305.	Wayne Chisholm	(Australia)	1984	Rd. 16	Debut	2	0	0	0	0
306.	Peter Cullum	(Australia)	1984–90	Rd. 17	Debut	35	4	0	0	16
307.	Ken Kelly	(Australia)	1984	Unknown	Debut	1	0	0	0	0
308.	Phil Daley	(Australia)	1985–89	Rd. 1	Debut	106	1	0	0	4
309.	Neville Elwin	(Australia)	1985	Rd. 1	Debut	1	0	0	0	0
310.	Marty Gurr	(Australia)	1985–88	Rd. 1	South Sydney Rabbitohs	48	8	8	8	32
311.	Richie Poulsen	(Australia)	1985–88	Rd. 1	Debut	44	2	0	0	8
312.	Dale Shearer	(Australia)	1985–89	Rd. 1	Debut	86	45	5	1	191
313.	Mark Pocock	(Australia)	1985–89	Rd. 2	Debut	61	1	0	0	4
314.	Darren Rodgers	(Australia)	1985–86	Rd. 2	Debut	13	1	0	0	4
315.	Paul Nacinovic	(Australia)	1985	Rd. 5	Debut	5	0	0	0	0
316.	Andy Goodway	(United Kingdom) (England)	1985	Rd. 12	Oldham R.L.F.C.	10	1	0	0	4
317.	James Leuluai	(New Zealand)	1985	Rd. 12	Hull F.C.	6	0	0	0	0
318.	David Ronson	(Australia)	1985–91	Rd. 16	Debut	101	34	2	0	140
319.	Jeff Butcher	(Australia)	1985	Rd. 18	Debut	1	0	0	0	0
320.	Owen Cunningham	(Australia)	1985–96, 1999	Rd. 18	Debut	208	21	0	0	84
321.	Steve Batty	(Australia)	1985	Unknown	Debut	1	0	0	0	0
322.	Mitchell Cox	(Australia)	1986–87	Rd. 1	North Sydney Bears	21	1	0	0	4
323.	Ron Gibbs	(Australia)	1986–87	Rd. 1	Eastern Suburbs Roosters	47	6	0	0	24
324.	Bill Hardy	(Australia)	1986	Rd. 3	Debut	13	1	0	0	4
325.	Steve Prest	(Australia)	1986	Rd. 4	Debut	5	0	0	0	0
326.	Cliff Lyons	(Australia)	1986–99	Rd. 7	North Sydney Bears	309	80	5	6	336
327.	Steve Gearin	(Australia)	1986	Rd. 9	Canterbury Bulldogs	3	0	0	0	0
328.	Glen Quetcher	(Australia)	1986	Rd. 12	Debut	5	0	0	0	0
329.	Paul Shaw	(Australia)	1986–89, 1994	Rd. 12	Debut	34	3	0	0	12
330.	Graeme Foster	(Australia)	1986	Rd. 19	Debut	1	0	0	0	0
331.	Michael Boden	(Australia)	1986	Rd. 23	Debut	1	0	0	0	0
332.	Paul Beath	(Australia)	1986–88	Rd. 24	Debut	3	0	0	0	0
333.	Charlie Haggett	(Australia)	1986–89	Rd. 26	Debut	25	4	0	0	16
334.	Michael O'Connor	(Australia)	1987—92	Rd. 1	St. George Dragons	115	54	180	2	578
335.	Darrell Williams	(New Zealand)	1987–93	Rd. 1	Debut	93	15	0	0	60
336.	Mark Brokenshire	(Australia)	1987	Rd. 2	Debut	4	0	0	0	0
337.	Steve Park	(Australia)	1987	Rd. 2	Debut	7	1	0	0	4
338.	Jeremy Ticehurst	(Australia)	1987–88, 1991	Rd. 4	Debut	25	6	0	0	24
339.	Greg Austin	(Australia)	1987–2019	Rd. 10	Salford	15	9	0	0	36
340.	Ian Gately	(Australia)	1987	Rd. 12	Debut	37	2	10	0	28
341.	Kevin Ward	(United Kingdom)	1987–88	Rd. 13	Castleford Tigers	15	2	0	0	8
342.	Matt Burke	(Australia)	1988–89	Rd. 1	Debut	28	7	0	0	28
343.	Don McKinnon	(Australia)	1988	Rd. 1	North Sydney Bears	6	1	0	0	4
344.	Greg Gibson	(Australia)	1988–89	Rd. 4	Penrith Panthers	7	0	6	0	12
345.	Tim Dwyer	(Australia)	1988	Rd. 6	Debut	11	2	7	0	22
346.	Joe Ropati	(New Zealand)	1988–89	Rd. 10	Debut	21	1	0	0	4
347.	Geoff Toovey	(Australia)	1988–99	Rd. 10	Debut	238	35	0	0	140
348.	Craig Hancock	(Australia)	1989–98	Rd. 3	Debut	172	64	0	0	256
349.	Simon Chappell	(Australia)	1989	Rd. 5	Debut	6	0	0	0	0
350.	Michael Greenaway	(Australia)	1989–91	Rd. 5	Debut	6	0	0	0	0
351.	Glenn Bourne	(Australia)	1989–91	Rd. 6	Debut	31	2	0	0	8
352.	Hugh Waddell	(England) (Scotland) (United Kingdom)	1989	Rd. 7	Leeds Rhinos	12	1	0	0	4
353.	Sean Townsend	(Australia)	1989–90	Rd. 9	Debut	24	5	0	0	20
354.	Bernard Dwyer	(United Kingdom) (Republic of Ireland)	1989	Rd. 11	St Helens R.F.C.	5	0	0	0	0
355.	John Jones	(Australia)	1989–94	Rd. 15	Debut	85	15	0	0	60
356.	Darren Riley	(Australia)	1989–90	Rd. 15	Debut	4	0	0	0	0
357.	David O'Donnell	(Australia)	1989–94	Rd. 20	Debut	81	4	0	0	16
358.	Martin Bella	(Australia)	1990–92	Rd. 1	North Sydney Bears	57	2	0	0	8
359.	Matt Dunford	(Australia)	1990–96	Rd. 1	Debut	81	7	0	0	28
360.	David Hosking	(Australia)	1990–93	Rd. 1	South Sydney Rabbitohs	63	1	0	0	4
361.	Tony Iro	(Australia)	1990–93	Rd. 1	Wigan Warriors	72	13	0	0	52
362.	Frank Stokes	(Australia)	1990–94	Rd. 1	Debut	51	17	2	0	72
363.	Chris White	(Australia)	1990–94	Rd. 1	Debut	46	0	0	0	0
364.	Danny Russell	(Australia) (Scotland)	1990–91	Rd. 2	Debut	8	0	0	0	0
365.	Ian Roberts	(Australia)	1990–95	Rd. 4	South Sydney Rabbitohs	100	4	0	0	16
366.	David Liddiard	(Australia)	1990–92	Rd. 7	Parramatta Eels	34	10	0	0	40
367.	Matthew Ridge	(New Zealand)	1990–96	Rd. 10	Debut	122	32	477	11	1093
368.	Michael Pechey	(Australia)	1990–91	Rd. 11	Debut	3	1	0	0	4
369.	Tony Mestrov	(Australia)	1990–92	Rd. 12	Debut	17	1	0	0	4
370.	Paul Smith	(Australia)	1990	Rd. 12	Debut	7	2	0	0	8
371.	Grant Doorey	(Australia)	1990–91	Rd. 14	Debut	9	1	0	0	4
372.	Adrian Shelford	(Australia)	1990	Rd. 14	Debut	11	0	0	0	0
373.	Danny Moore	(Australia)	1991–97	Rd. 7	Debut	119	41	0	0	164
374.	David Myers	(United Kingdom)	1991	Rd. 10	Wigan Warriors	4	1	0	0	4
375.	Matt Nable	(Australia)	1991–92	Rd. 11	Debut	5	1	0	0	4
376.	Hami Shelford	(Australia)	1991	Rd. 11	Debut	1	0	0	0	0
377.	Kevin Iro	(Australia)	1991–92	Rd. 14	Wigan Warriors	24	9	0	0	36
378.	Jon Grieve	(Australia)	1991–93	Rd. 18	Debut	19	0	0	0	0
379.	Craig Teevan	(Australia)	1992	Rd. 1	Debut	2	0	0	0	0
380.	Gene Ngamu	(New Zealand)	1992–93	Rd. 5	Debut	9	1	0	0	4
381.	Anthony Rogers	(Australia)	1992–95	Rd. 7	Debut	12	4	0	0	16
382.	Chris Ryan	(Australia)	1992–94	Rd. 9	Debut	26	12	0	0	48
383.	Ivan Cleary	(Australia)	1992–93	Rd. 14	Debut	15	8	50	0	132
384.	Nik Kosef	(Australia)	1992–99	Rd. 18	Debut	130	14	0	0	56
385.	Daniel Gartner	(Australia)	1992—99	Rd. 22	Debut	120	35	0	0	140
386.	David Alexander	(Australia)	1993–94	Rd. 1	North Sydney Bears	30	2	0	0	8
387.	Jack Elsegood	(Australia)	1993–99	Rd. 1	Debut	72	25	5	0	110
388.	Scott Fulton	(Australia)	1993–99	Rd. 1	Debut	49	1	0	0	4
389.	Danny Mamo	(Australia)	1993	Rd. 2	Parramatta Eels	1	0	0	0	0
390.	Darren Maroon	(Lebanon)	1993	Rd. 2	South Sydney Rabbitohs	1	0	0	0	0
391.	John Devereux	(United Kingdom) (Wales)	1993	Rd. 9	Widnes Vikings	15	2	2	0	12
392.	John Hopoate	(Australia) (Tonga)	1993–99, 2003–05	Rd. 10	Debut	150	69	0	0	276
393.	Jamie Olejnik	(Australia)	1993–94, 1998	Rd. 10	Penrith Panthers	22	8	0	0	32
394.	Col Bentley	(Australia)	1993–94	Rd. 11	Penrith Panthers	3	0	0	0	0
395.	Steve Menzies	(Australia)	1993–99, 2003–08	Rd. 13	Debut	280	151	1	0	606
396.	Richard Kairouz	(Australia) (Lebanon)	1993	Rd. 20	Debut	2	0	0	0	0
397.	Peter Clarke	(Australia)	1993	Rd. 22	Debut	1	0	0	0	0
398.	Mark Carroll	(Australia)	1994–97	Rd. 1	South Sydney Rabbitohs	88	5	0	0	20
399.	David Gillespie	(Australia)	1994–97	Rd. 1	Western Suburbs Magpies	92	1	0	0	4
400.	Terry Hill	(Australia)	1994–99, 2005	Rd. 1	Western Suburbs Magpies	142	64	0	0	256
401.	Jorgen Rogers	(New Zealand)	1994	Rd. 1	Debut	1	0	0	0	0
402.	Vilai Keelemite	(Australia)	1994	Rd. 6	Debut	2	0	0	0	0
403.	Solomon Haumono	(Tonga)	1994–96	Rd. 11	Debut	39	6	0	0	24
404.	Brett Fulton	(Australia)	1994	Rd. 14	Debut	1	0	0	0	0
405.	Greg Donaghey	(Australia)	1994	Rd. 21	Debut	2	0	0	0	0
406.	Shannon Nevin	(Australia)	1995–97	Rd. 1	Debut	29	6	52	0	128
407.	Adam Bertoli	(Australia)	1995	Rd. 5	Debut	1	0	0	0	0
408.	Mathew Guberina	(Australia)	1995–97	Rd. 7	Debut	6	0	0	0	0
409.	Billy Weepu	(New Zealand)	1995–97	Rd. 20	Debut	13	0	0	0	0
410.	Anthony Colella	(Australia)	1995–99	Rd. 22	Debut	43	6	0	0	24
411.	Adam Nable	(Australia)	1995	Rd. 22	Debut	1	0	0	0	0
412.	Craig Innes	(New Zealand)	1996–97	Rd. 1	Western Reds	50	25	11	0	122
413.	Martin-John Kelly	(Australia)	1996	Rd. 3	Canberra Raiders	1	0	0	0	0
414.	Neil Tierney	(Australia)	1996–99	Rd. 4	Western Suburbs Magpies	77	1	0	0	8
415.	Jim Serdaris	(Australia)	1996–99	Rd. 6	Western Suburbs Magpies	80	8	0	0	32
416.	Craig Field	(Australia)	1997–99	Rd. 1	South Sydney Rabbitohs	54	7	44	3	119
417.	Andrew Hunter	(Australia)	1997–98	Rd. 1	Debut	27	9	4	0	44
418.	Robert Johnson	(Australia)	1997	Rd. 4	Debut	2	0	0	0	0
419.	Dragan Durdevic	(Australia)	1997–99	Rd. 22	Debut	2	0	0	0	0
420.	Danny Costelloe	(Australia)	1998–99	Rd. 24	Debut	5	0	0	0	0
421.	Luke Phillips	(Australia)	1998	Rd. 1	North Queensland Cowboys	22	6	50	1	125
422.	Albert Torrens	(Australia)	1998–99, 2003–04	Rd. 1	Debut	87	38	0	0	152
423.	Corey Underwood	(Australia)	1998	Rd. 1	Debut	5	0	0	0	0
424.	Damian Browne	(Australia)	1998	Rd. 3	South Sydney Rabbitohs	14	0	0	0	0
425.	Adam Peters	(Australia)	1998–99	Rd. 3	Canberra Raiders	29	3	0	0	12
426.	Joe Taylor	(Australia)	1998	Rd. 4	Paris Saint-Germain	17	0	0	0	0
427.	Jamie Bennett	(Australia)	1998	Rd. 7	Debut	2	1	0	0	4
428.	Alf Duncan	(Australia) (United States)	1998–99	Rd. 10	Debut	20	14	5	0	66
429.	Jason Lussick	(Australia)	1998–99	Rd. 23	Debut	3	0	0	0	0
430.	Adam Brown	(Australia)	1999	Rd. 1	Debut	16	1	38	0	80
431.	Steven Crouch	(Australia)	1999	Rd. 1	Parramatta Eels	10	0	0	0	0
432.	Andrew King	(Australia)	1999	Rd. 1	Gold Coast Chargers	17	6	0	0	24
433.	Graham Mackay	(Australia)	1999	Rd. 1	Gold Coast Chargers	8	1	2	0	8
434.	Brendon Reeves	(Australia)	1999, 2003	Rd. 1	Illawarra Steelers	33	7	14	0	56
435.	Wes Doyle	(Australia)	1999	Rd. 3	Debut	2	0	0	0	0
436.	Andrew Frew	(Australia)	1999	Rd. 3	Parramatta Eels	21	12	0	0	48
437.	Adam Hayden	(Australia)	1999	Rd. 3	Sydney City Roosters	13	3	2	0	16
438.	Phil Bailey	(Australia)	1999	Rd. 5	Debut	9	0	0	0	0
439.	Damian Driscoll	(Australia)	1999	Rd. 11	Gold Coast Chargers	11	1	0	0	4
440.	Phil Adamson	(Australia)	1999	Rd. 17	Penrith Panthers	7	1	0	0	4
441.	Greg Ebrill	(Australia)	1999	Rd. 20	Debut	6	0	0	0	0
442.	Aaron Cannings	(New Zealand)	2003	Rd. 2	Northern Eagles	22	3	0	0	12
443.	Scott Donald	(Australia)	2003–05	Rd. 2	Parramatta Eels	68	48	0	0	192
444.	Luke Dorn	(Australia)	2003	Rd. 2	Northern Eagles	18	3	0	0	12
445.	Jason Ferris	(Australia)	2003	Rd. 2	Northern Eagles	18	2	7	1	23
446.	Tony Jensen	(Australia)	2003	Rd. 2	Northern Eagles	20	1	0	0	4
447.	Jason King	(Australia)	2003–14	Rd. 2	Northern Eagles	217	9	0	0	36
448.	Danny Lima	(Samoa)	2003	Rd. 2	Northern Eagles	17	4	0	0	16
449.	Ben MacDougall	(Australia)	2003	Rd. 2	Northern Eagles	23	8	0	0	32
450.	Kevin McGuinness	(Australia)	2003	Rd. 2	Wests Tigers	16	5	0	0	20
451.	Sam Murphy	(Australia)	2003	Rd. 2	Northern Eagles	3	1	0	0	4
452.	Chad Randall	(Australia)	2003–05	Rd. 2	Northern Eagles	53	7	0	0	28
453.	Ben Walker	(Australia)	2003	Rd. 2	Leeds Rhinos	16	5	59	0	138
454.	Anthony Watmough	(Australia)	2003–14	Rd. 2	Northern Eagles	278	71	0	0	284
455.	Grant Wooden	(Australia)	2003	Rd. 2	Northern Eagles	4	0	0	0	0
456.	Luke Williamson	(Australia)	2003–08	Rd. 3	Northern Eagles	132	14	40	0	136
457.	Mark Shipway	(Australia)	2003	Rd. 4	Northern Eagles	14	1	0	0	4
458.	Nathan Long	(Australia)	2003	Rd. 7	Northern Eagles	2	0	0	0	0
459.	Sam Harris	(New Zealand)	2003–05	Rd. 10	Debut	59	10	3	0	46
460.	Alex Moore	(Australia)	2003	Rd. 14	Debut	3	0	0	0	0
461.	Brett Stewart	(Australia)	2003–16	Rd. 17	Debut	233	163	0	0	652
462.	Mitch Creary	(Australia)	2003–06	Rd. 18	Northern Eagles	10	4	0	0	16
463.	Craig Hayne	(Australia)	2003	Rd. 20	Debut	1	0	0	0	0
464.	Glenn Stewart	(Australia)	2003–14	Rd. 20	Debut	185	27	0	0	108
465.	Gary Winter	(Australia)	2003	Rd. 23	Debut	4	0	0	0	0
466.	Ian Donnelly	(Australia)	2004	Rd. 1	St. George Illawarra Dragons	14	1	0	0	4
467.	Shayne Dunley	(Australia)	2004–07	Rd. 1	Parramatta Eels	70	6	0	0	24
468.	Daniel Heckenberg	(Australia) (Scotland)	2004–05	Rd. 1	Parramatta Eels	34	2	0	0	8
469.	Chris Hicks	(Australia)	2004–07	Rd. 2	Penrith Panthers	93	42	7	0	182
470.	Nathan Hollingsworth	(Australia)	2004	Rd. 1	Parramatta Eels	11	0	0	0	0
471.	Kylie Leuluai	(New Zealand) (Samoa)	2004–06	Rd. 3	Parramatta Eels	57	4	0	0	16
472.	Michael Monaghan	(Australia)	2004–07	Rd. 1	Canberra Raiders	95	17	2	7	79
473.	Jye Mullane	(Australia)	2004	Rd. 1	Cronulla Sharks	12	3	0	0	12
474.	Paul Stephenson	(Australia)	2004–06	Rd. 1	Debut	43	17	0	0	68
475.	Andrew Walker	(Australia)	2004	Rd. 1	Sydney Roosters	24	5	80	0	180
476.	Kane Cleal	(Australia)	2004–05	Rd. 3	Debut	14	1	0	0	4
477.	Nathan Tutt	(Australia)	2004–06	Rd. 5	St. George Illawarra Dragons	19	1	0	0	4
478.	Jeff Robson	(Australia)	2004–08	Rd. 11	Debut	6	0	0	0	0
479.	David Warry	(Australia)	2004	Rd. 14	Debut	1	0	0	0	0
480.	Nick Bradley-Qalilawa	(Fiji)	2004	Rd. 15	Wests Tigers	11	4	0	0	16
481.	Nick Paterson	(Australia)	2004	Rd. 17	Cronulla Sharks	1	0	0	0	0
482.	Mark Lennon	(Australia) (Wales)	2004	Rd. 22	Castleford Tigers	1	0	0	0	0
483.	Phil Morwood	(Australia)	2004–08	Rd. 26	Debut	8	0	0	0	0
484.	Ben Kennedy	(Australia)	2005–06	Rd. 1	Newcastle Knights	42	10	0	0	40
485.	Brent Kite	(Tonga) (Australia)	2005–13	Rd. 1	St. George Illawarra Dragons	221	12	0	0	48
486.	Michael Witt	(Australia)	2005–06	Rd. 1	Parramatta Eels	20	5	62	0	144
487.	Steve Matai	(New Zealand)	2005–16	Rd. 3	Debut	232	93	22	0	416
488.	Mark Bryant	(Australia)	2005–08	Rd. 9	Canberra Raiders	93	3	0	0	12
489.	Jim Curtis	(Australia)	2005	Rd. 9	Debut	2	0	0	0	0
490.	Ashley Alberts	(Australia)	2005	Rd. 14	North Queensland Cowboys	8	2	0	0	8
491.	Travis Burns	(Australia)	2005–07	Rd. 18	Debut	38	3	17	0	46
492.	Steven Bell	(Australia)	2006–08	Rd. 1	Melbourne Storm	65	31	0	0	124
493.	Matt Orford	(Australia)	2006–09	Rd. 1	Melbourne Storm	98	17	242	9	561
494.	Michael Robertson	(Australia) (Scotland)	2006–11	Rd. 2	Canberra Raiders	150	68	2	0	276
495.	Adam Cuthbertson	(Australia)	2006–09	Rd. 3	Debut	54	8	0	0	32
496.	George Rose	(Australia)	2006–13	Rd. 7	Sydney Roosters	129	10	0	0	40
497.	Mailangi Styles	(Australia)	2006	Rd. 11	Debut	1	0	0	0	0
498.	Glenn Hall	(Australia)	2007–09	Rd. 1	Sydney Roosters	65	11	0	0	44
499.	Jamie Lyon	(Australia)	2007–16	Rd. 1	St Helens R.F.C.	224	86	531	0	1406
500.	Matt Ballin	(Australia)	2007–15	Rd. 2	Debut	217	22	0	0	88
501.	Clint Halden	(Australia)	2007	Rd. 2	Debut	6	1	0	0	4
502.	Shane Neumann	(Australia)	2007–09	Rd. 10	Debut	7	1	0	0	4
503.	Jack Afamasaga	(New Zealand) (Samoa)	2007–08	Rd. 16	Parramatta Eels	14	1	0	0	4
504.	Sione Finefeuiaki	(Samoa)	2007	Rd. 16	Debut	1	0	0	0	0
505.	Jason Wells	(Australia)	2007	Rd. 22	Debut	3	0	0	0	0
506.	Michael Bani	(Australia)	2007–09	Rd. 24	Debut	20	8	0	0	32
507.	Vic Mauro	(Australia) (Italy)	2007–12	Rd. 24	Debut	47	1	0	0	4
508.	Josh Perry	(Australia)	2008	Rd. 1	Newcastle Knights	69	5	0	0	20
509.	David Vaealiki	(New Zealand)	2008	Rd. 1	Wigan Warriors	2	0	0	0	0
510.	Heath L'Estrange	(Australia)	2008–09	Rd. 3	Sydney Roosters	44	2	0	0	8
511.	David Williams	(Australia)	2008–15	Rd. 9	Debut	103	66	4	0	272
512.	Chris Bailey	(Australia)	2009–10	Rd. 1	Newcastle Knights	46	7	0	0	28
513.	Shane Rodney	(Australia)	2009–11	Rd. 1	Penrith Panthers	52	3	16	0	44
514.	Andrew Suniula	(United States)	2009	Rd. 1	Debut	4	1	0	0	4
515.	Tony Williams	(Tonga) (Australia)	2009–12	Rd. 5	Parramatta Eels	73	35	0	0	140
516.	Jared Waerea-Hargreaves	(New Zealand)	2009	Rd. 9	Debut	6	1	0	0	4
517.	Ben Farrar	(Australia)	2009–10	Rd. 14	North Queensland Cowboys	35	15	0	0	60
518.	Kieran Foran	(New Zealand)	2009–15, 2021–22	Rd. 15	Debut	196	40	4	0	168
519.	Terence Seu Seu	(Australia)	2010–11	Rd. 1	Cronulla Sharks	9	0	0	0	0
520.	Matthew Cross	(Australia)	2010	Rd. 2	Melbourne Storm	16	3	0	0	12
521.	Joe Galuvao	(Samoa) (New Zealand)	2010–13	Rd. 2	Parramatta Eels	78	1	0	0	4
522.	Trent Hodkinson	(Australia)	2010, 2018–19	Rd. 2	Debut	38	6	22	3	71
523.	Jamie Buhrer	(Australia)	2010–16	Rd. 10	Debut	128	18	0	0	72
524.	Dean Whare	(New Zealand)	2010–12	Rd. 12	Debut	25	9	0	0	36
525.	William Hopoate	(Australia)	2010–11	Rd. 13	Debut	22	14	0	0	56
526.	Michael Oldfield	(Tonga)	2010–12	Rd. 23	Debut	25	14	0	0	56
527.	Daly Cherry-Evans	(Australia)	2011–25	Rd. 1	Debut	352	98	205	29	831
528.	Daniel Harrison	(Australia)	2011–12, 2014	Rd. 2	Debut	20	2	0	0	8
529.	Tim Robinson	(Australia)	2011–12	Rd. 2	Debut	18	0	0	0	0
530.	Darcy Lussick	(Australia)	2011–12, 2016–18	Rd. 14	Debut	64	1	0	0	4
531.	Nick Skinner	(Australia)	2012–13	Rd. 4	Debut	6	1	0	0	4
532.	Jorge Taufua	(Tonga) (Samoa)	2012–22	Rd. 4	Debut	164	88	0	0	352
533.	Liam Foran	(New Zealand)	2012	Rd. 6	Melbourne Storm	7	0	0	0	0
534.	Richard Faʻaoso	(Tonga)	2013	Rd. 1	Melbourne Storm	18	0	0	0	0
535.	David Gower	(New Zealand)	2013	Rd. 6	St. George Illawarra Dragons	12	0	0	0	0
536.	Justin Horo	(Samoa)	2013–15	Rd. 1	Parramatta Eels	68	15	0	0	60
537.	Brenton Lawrence	(Australia)	2013–17	Rd. 1	Gold Coast Titans	86	6	0	0	24
538.	Jesse Sene-Lefao	(Samoa)	2013–15	Rd. 1	Debut	38	3	0	0	12
539.	Tom Symonds	(Australia)	2013–16	Rd. 2	Sydney Roosters	65	13	0	0	52
540.	Peta Hiku	(New Zealand)	2013–15	Rd. 6	Debut	60	28	3	0	118
541.	James Hasson	(Republic of Ireland)	2013–15	Rd. 8	Debut	39	2	0	0	8
542.	Esikeli Tonga	(Tonga)	2013	Rd. 8	Debut	1	0	0	0	0
543.	Ligi Sao	(Samoa)	2013–15	Rd. 18	Debut	21	2	0	0	8
544.	Clinton Gutherson	(Australia)	2013–15	Rd. 26	Debut	5	4	0	0	16
545.	Jake Trbojevic	(Australia)	2013–	Rd. 26	Debut	252	35	0	0	140
546.	Cheyse Blair	(Australia)	2014–15	Rd. 1	Parramatta Eels	16	8	0	0	32
547.	Dunamis Lui	(Samoa)	2014–15	Rd. 1	Melbourne Storm	38	1	0	0	4
548.	Josh Starling	(Australia)	2014–16	Rd. 1	South Sydney Rabbitohs	60	2	0	0	8
549.	Tony Satini	(Tonga)	2014	Rd. 3	Debut	1	0	0	0	0
550.	Jack Littlejohn	(Australia)	2014	Rd. 8	Debut	5	0	0	1	1
551.	Jayden Hodges	(Australia)	2014–15	Rd. 17	Debut	11	1	0	0	4
552.	Tyson Andrews	(Australia)	2014	Rd. 18	Debut	4	0	0	0	0
553.	Michael Chee-Kam	(Australia)	2014–15, 2025	Rd. 26	Debut	6	0	0	0	0
554.	Luke Burgess	(England)	2015–16	Rd. 1	South Sydney Rabbitohs	19	0	0	0	0
555.	Blake Leary	(Australia)	2015–16	Rd. 1	North Queensland Cowboys	4	0	0	0	0
556.	Willie Mason	(Tonga) (Australia)	2015	Rd. 1	Newcastle Knights	19	1	0	0	4
557.	Feleti Mateo	(Tonga)	2015–16	Rd. 1	Parramatta Eels	22	2	5	0	18
558.	Brayden Wiliame	(Fiji)	2015–16	Rd. 3	Parramatta Eels	23	7	0	0	28
559.	Tom Trbojevic	(Australia)	2015–	Rd. 5	Debut	176	117	0	0	468
560.	Lewis Brown	(New Zealand)	2016–18	Rd. 1	Penrith Panthers	48	5	0	0	20
561.	Nathan Green	(Australia)	2016	Rd. 1	St George Illawarra Dragons	6	1	0	0	4
562.	Apisai Koroisau	(Fiji)	2016–19	Rd. 1	Penrith Panthers	77	11	2	0	48
563.	Nate Myles	(Australia)	2016–17	Rd. 1	Gold Coast Titans	26	0	0	0	0
564.	Matt Parcell	(Australia)	2016	Rd. 1	Brisbane Broncos	15	2	0	0	8
565.	Martin Taupau	(Samoa) (New Zealand)	2016–22	Rd. 1	Wests Tigers	156	12	0	0	48
566.	Siosaia Vave	(Tonga)	2016	Rd. 1	Cronulla Sharks	23	1	0	0	4
567.	Dylan Walker	(Australia)	2016–22	Rd. 1	South Sydney Rabbitohs	124	32	40	0	208
568.	Addin Fonua-Blake	(Tonga) (New Zealand)	2016–20	Rd. 7	Debut	97	13	0	0	52
569.	Pita Godinet	(Samoa)	2016	Rd. 9	Wakefield Trinity Wildcats	2	1	1	0	6
570.	Matthew Wright	(Samoa)	2016–18	Rd. 9	North Queensland Cowboys	47	12	43	0	134
571.	Liam Knight	(Australia)	2016	Rd. 15	Debut	1	0	0	0	0
572.	Brad Parker	(Australia)	2016–24	Rd. 19	Debut	118	29	0	0	116
573.	Frank Winterstein	(Samoa)	2016–18	Rd. 24	Widnes Vikings	42	3	0	0	12
574.	Billy Bainbridge	(Australia)	2016–17	Rd. 26	Debut	3	0	0	0	0
575.	Blake Green	(Australia)	2017	Rd. 1	Melbourne Storm	24	3	0	0	12
576.	Brian Kelly	(Australia)	2017–18	Rd. 1	Debut	47	15	0	0	60
577.	Lloyd Perrett	(New Zealand)	2017–19	Rd. 1	Canterbury Bulldogs	32	2	0	0	8
578.	Curtis Sironen	(Australia)	2017–21	Rd. 2	Wests Tigers	66	17	0	0	68
579.	Akuila Uate	(Fiji) (Australia)	2017–18	Rd. 1	Newcastle Knights	39	19	0	0	76
580.	Cameron Cullen	(Australia)	2017	Rd. 2	Gold Coast Titans	5	0	0	0	0
581.	Jarrad Kennedy	(Australia)	2017	Rd. 2	Canberra Raiders	2	0	0	0	0
582.	Jackson Hastings	(United Kingdom)	2017–18	Rd. 3	Sydney Roosters	13	2	3	0	14
583.	Shaun Lane	(Australia)	2017–18	Rd. 3	New Zealand Warriors	33	10	0	0	40
584.	Joey Lussick	(Australia)	2017	Rd. 20	Debut	1	1	0	0	4
585.	Kelepi Tanginoa	(Australia)	2017–19	Rd. 22	North Queensland Cowboys	17	0	0	0	0
586.	Lachlan Croker	(Australia)	2018–	Rd. 1	Canberra Raiders	125	20	0	0	80
587.	Joel Thompson	(Australia)	2018–20	Rd. 1	St. George Illawarra Dragons	60	16	0	0	64
588.	Jack Gosiewski	(Australia)	2018–21	Rd. 5	South Sydney Rabbitohs	46	11	0	0	44
589.	Jonathan Wright	(Australia)	2018	Rd. 5	New Zealand Warriors	1	1	0	0	4
590.	Taniela Paseka	(New Zealand)	2018–	Rd. 6	Debut	134	9	0	0	36
591.	Moses Suli	(Fiji)	2018–21	Rd. 9	Wests Tigers	63	12	0	0	48
592.	Tom Wright	(Australia)	2018	Rd. 10	Debut	5	1	0	0	4
593.	Toafofoa Sipley	(Niue)	2018–25	Rd. 11	New Zealand Warriors	97	8	0	0	32
594.	Manase Fainu	(Tonga)	2018–19	Rd. 16	Debut	34	8	0	0	32
595.	Kane Elgey	(Australia)	2019	Rd. 1	Gold Coast Titans	12	1	0	0	4
596.	Brendan Elliot	(Australia)	2019–20	Rd. 1	Newcastle Knights	26	2	0	0	8
597.	Reuben Garrick	(Australia)	2019–	Rd. 1	Debut	168	94	510	0	1396
598.	Corey Waddell	(Australia)	2019–20, 2024–	Rd. 2	Debut	81	10	0	0	40
599.	Morgan Boyle	(Australia)	2019–23	Rd. 6	Gold Coast Titans	27	0	0	0	0
600.	Abbas Miski	(Lebanon)	2019–20	Rd. 8	Debut	6	2	0	0	8
601.	Cade Cust	(Australia)	2019–21	Rd. 10	Debut	27	9	0	0	36
602.	Sean Keppie	(Australia)	2019–23	Rd. 25	Debut	79	2	0	0	8
603.	Haumole Olakau'atu	(Tonga)	2019–	Finals week 1	Debut	119	45	0	0	180
604.	Danny Levi	(New Zealand) (Samoa)	2020	Rd. 1	Newcastle Knights	20	2	0	0	8
605.	Tevita Funa	(Australia)	2020–21	Rd. 5	Debut	16	5	0	0	20
606.	Albert Hopoate	(Tonga) (Australia)	2020	Rd. 16	Debut	5	0	0	0	0
607.	Morgan Harper	(New Zealand)	2020–23	Rd. 17	Canterbury Bulldogs	54	15	0	0	60
608.	Josh Schuster	(Samoa)	2020–23	Rd. 17	Debut	50	5	0	0	20
609.	Josh Aloiai	(Samoa)	2021–25	Rd. 1	Wests Tigers	74	5	0	0	20
610.	Andrew Davey	(Australia)	2021–22	Rd. 1	Parramatta Eels	20	3	0	0	12
611.	Jason Saab	(Australia)	2021–	Rd. 1	St George Illawarra Dragons	109	73	0	0	292
612.	Zac Saddler	(Australia)	2021	Rd. 9	Debut	3	0	0	0	0
613.	Karl Lawton	(Australia)	2021–24	Rd. 11	New Zealand Warriors	59	6	0	0	24
614.	Christian Tuipulotu	(Tonga)	2021–23	Rd. 11	Sydney Roosters	33	13	0	0	52
615.	Ben Trbojevic	(Australia)	2021–	Rd. 12	Debut	80	17	0	0	68
616.	Kurt De Luis	(Australia)	2021–22	Rd. 14	Debut	12	0	0	0	0
617.	Ethan Bullemor	(Australia)	2022–	Rd. 1	Brisbane Broncos	91	12	0	0	48
618.	Toluta'u Koula	(Tonga)	2022–	Rd. 1	Debut	92	43	0	0	172
619.	Kaeo Weekes	(Australia)	2022–23	Rd. 19	Debut	12	1	0	0	4
620.	Zac Fulton	(Australia)	2022	Rd. 20	Debut	1	0	0	0	0
621.	Pio Seci	(Fiji)	2022	Rd. 20	Debut	1	0	0	0	0
622.	James Segeyaro	(Papua New Guinea)	2022	Rd. 20	Brisbane Broncos	1	0	0	0	0
623.	Alfred Smalley	(Niue)	2022	Rd. 20	Debut	2	1	0	0	4
624.	Ray Vaega	(New Zealand)	2022–24	Rd. 24	Debut	12	3	0	0	12
625.	James Roumanos	(Lebanon)	2022	Rd. 25	Debut	1	0	0	0	0
626.	Cooper Johns	(Australia)	2023	Rd. 1	Melbourne Storm	8	0	0	0	0
627.	Kelma Tuilagi	(Samoa)	2023	Rd. 1	Wests Tigers	14	1	0	0	4
628.	Aaron Woods	(Australia)	2023–24	Rd. 7	St. George Illawarra Dragons	18	0	0	0	0
629.	Samuela Fainu	(Australia)	2023	Rd. 8	Debut	5	0	0	0	0
630.	Ben Condon	(Australia)	2023–24	Rd. 12	North Queensland Cowboys	5	1	0	0	4
631.	Jake Arthur	(Australia)	2023–25	Rd. 13	Parramatta Eels	7	1	0	0	4
632.	Dean Matterson	(Australia)	2023	Rd. 20	Debut	8	1	0	0	4
633.	Matthew Lodge	(Australia)	2023–25	Rd. 21	Sydney Roosters	24	2	0	0	8
634.	Gordon Chan Kum Tong	(Samoa)	2023–25	Rd. 26	Debut	12	1	1	0	6
635.	Luke Brooks	(Australia)	2024–	Rd. 1	Wests Tigers	61	11	0	0	44
636.	Nathan Brown	(Australia) (Italy)	2024–	Rd. 1	Sydney Roosters	40	1	0	0	4
637.	Jaxson Paulo	(Samoa)	2024	Rd. 1	Sydney Roosters	8	2	0	0	8
638.	Tommy Talau	(Samoa)	2024–25	Rd. 2	Wests Tigers	36	41	0	0	164
639.	Lehi Hopoate	(Australia) (Tonga)	2024–	Rd. 12	Debut	46	26	0	0	104
640.	Jake Simpkin	(Australia)	2024–	Rd. 15	Wests Tigers	39	2	0	0	8
641.	Aitasi James	(New Zealand)	2024	Rd. 16	Wests Tigers	1	0	0	0	0
642.	Caleb Navale	(Fiji)	2024–	Rd. 16	Debut	9	1	0	0	4
643.	Aaron Schoupp	(Australia)	2024–	Rd. 16	Gold Coast Titans	5	1	0	0	4
644.	Clayton Faulalo	(Australia)	2024–	Rd. 19	Debut	18	10	0	0	40
645.	Jamie Humphreys	(Australia)	2024	Rd. 19	Debut	1	1	3	0	10
646.	Siosiua Taukeiaho	(Tonga) (New Zealand)	2025–	Rd. 1	Catalans Dragons	26	1	0	0	4
647.	Jazz Tevaga	(Samoa)	2025	Rd. 1	New Zealand Warriors	24	0	0	0	0
648.	Joey Walsh	(Australia)	2025–	Rd. 27	Debut	3	1	0	0	4
649.	Jamal Fogarty	(Australia)	2026–	Rd. 1	Canberra Raiders	9	3	32	1	77
650.	Kobe Hetherington	(Australia)	2026–	Rd. 1	Brisbane Broncos	10	1	0	0	4
651.	Paul Bryan	(Australia)	2026–	Rd. 2	Newcastle Knights	2	0	0	0	0
652.	Brandon Wakeham	(Fiji)	2026–	Rd. 2	Wests Tigers	9	1	0	0	4
653.	Simione Laiafi	(Australia)	2026–	Rd. 4	Debut	2	0	0	0	0
654.	Josh Feledy	(Australia)	2026–	Rd. 5	Wests Tigers	2	0	0	0	0
655.	Jackson Shereb	(Australia)	2026–	Rd. 10	Debut	2	0	0	0	0
656.	Zach Dockar-Clay	(New Zealand)	2026–	Rd. 11	Sydney Roosters	1	0	0	0	0
657.	Blake Wilson	(Australia)	2026–	Rd. 11	Canterbury Bulldogs	2	1	0	0	4
