= 1951 NSWRFL season =

Rugby league competition

1951 New South Wales Rugby Football League
- Teams: 10
- Premiers: South Sydney (13th title)
- Minor premiers: South Sydney (12th title)
- Matches played: 94
- Points scored: 3400
- Top points scorer: Ron Rowles (220)
- Wooden spoon: North Sydney (8th spoon)
- Top try-scorer: Johnny Graves (28)

The 1951 New South Wales Rugby Football League premiership was the forty-fourth season of Sydney’s top-level rugby league competition, Australia’s first. Ten teams from across the city competed for the newly created J. J. Giltinan Shield during the season which culminated in a grand final between South Sydney and Manly-Warringah.

== Season summary ==
South Sydney ascended to the minor premiership with relative ease in 1951, losing only one match during the season to finish the regular season ahead by a record eleven-point margin.

== Teams ==
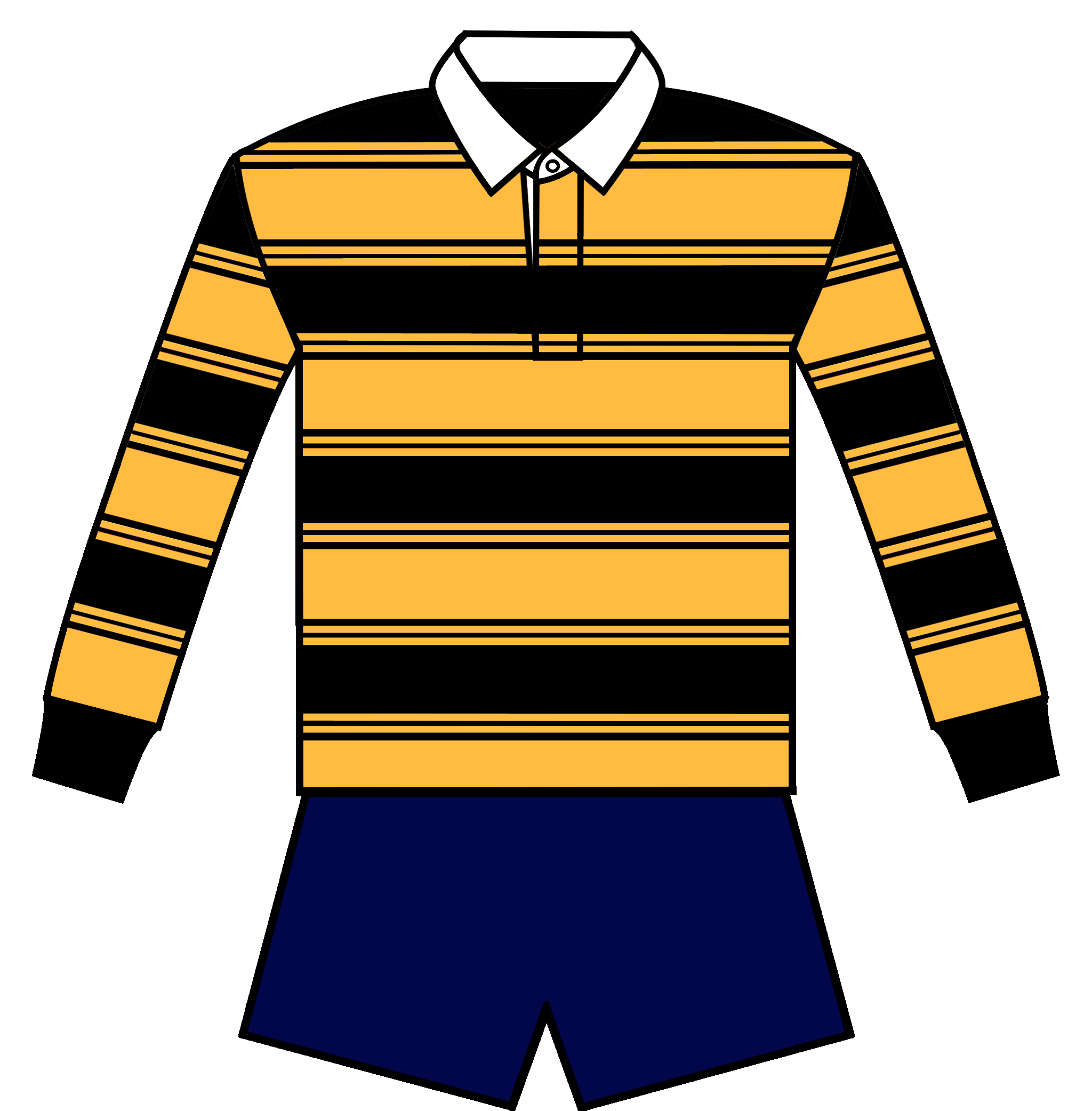
Balmain 44th season Ground: Leichhardt Oval; Coach: Jim Duckworth; Captain: Stan Ponchard

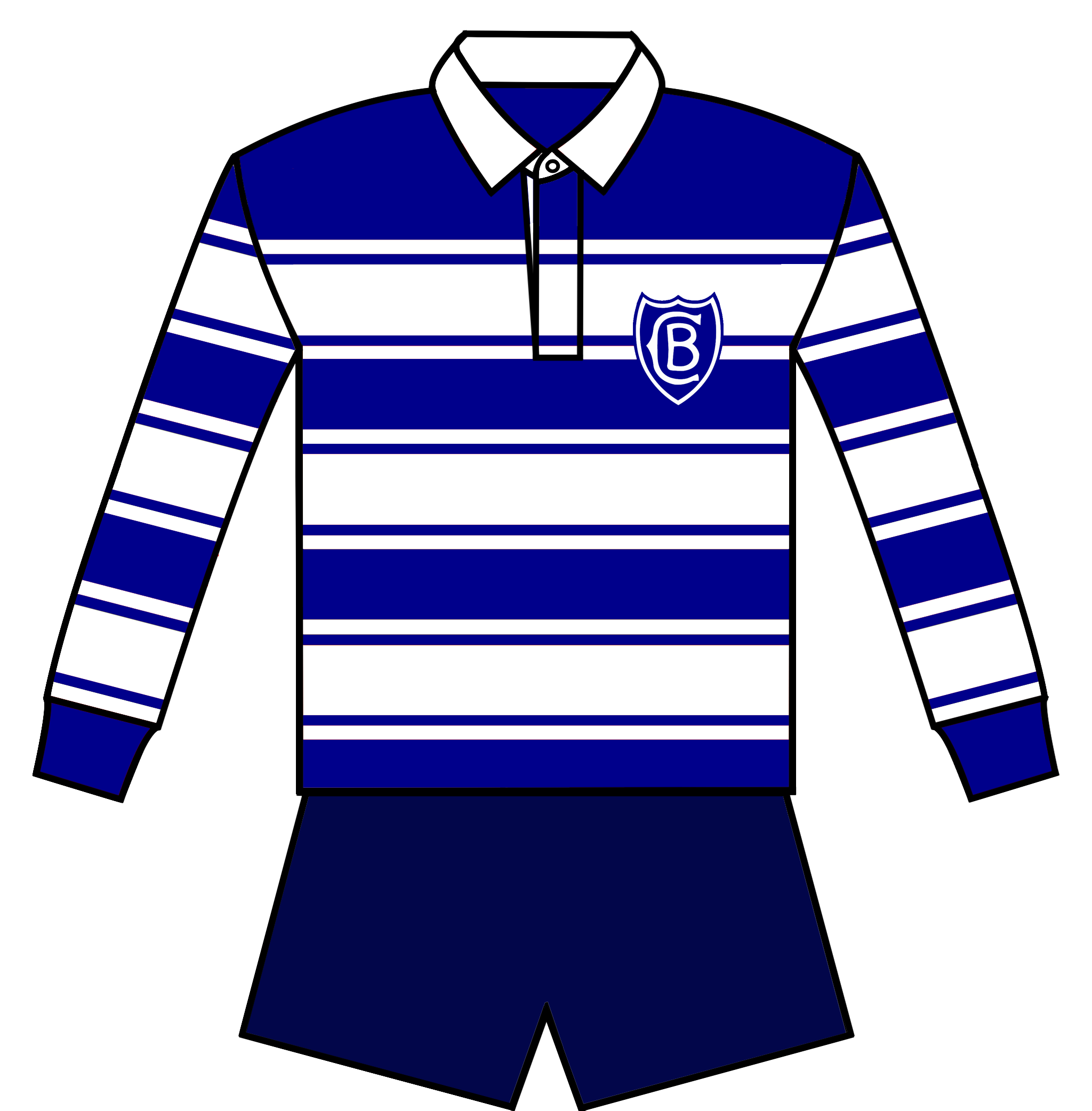
Canterbury-Bankstown 17th season Ground: Belmore Sports Ground; Coach: Vic Bulgin→Alby Why; Captain: Vic Bulgin

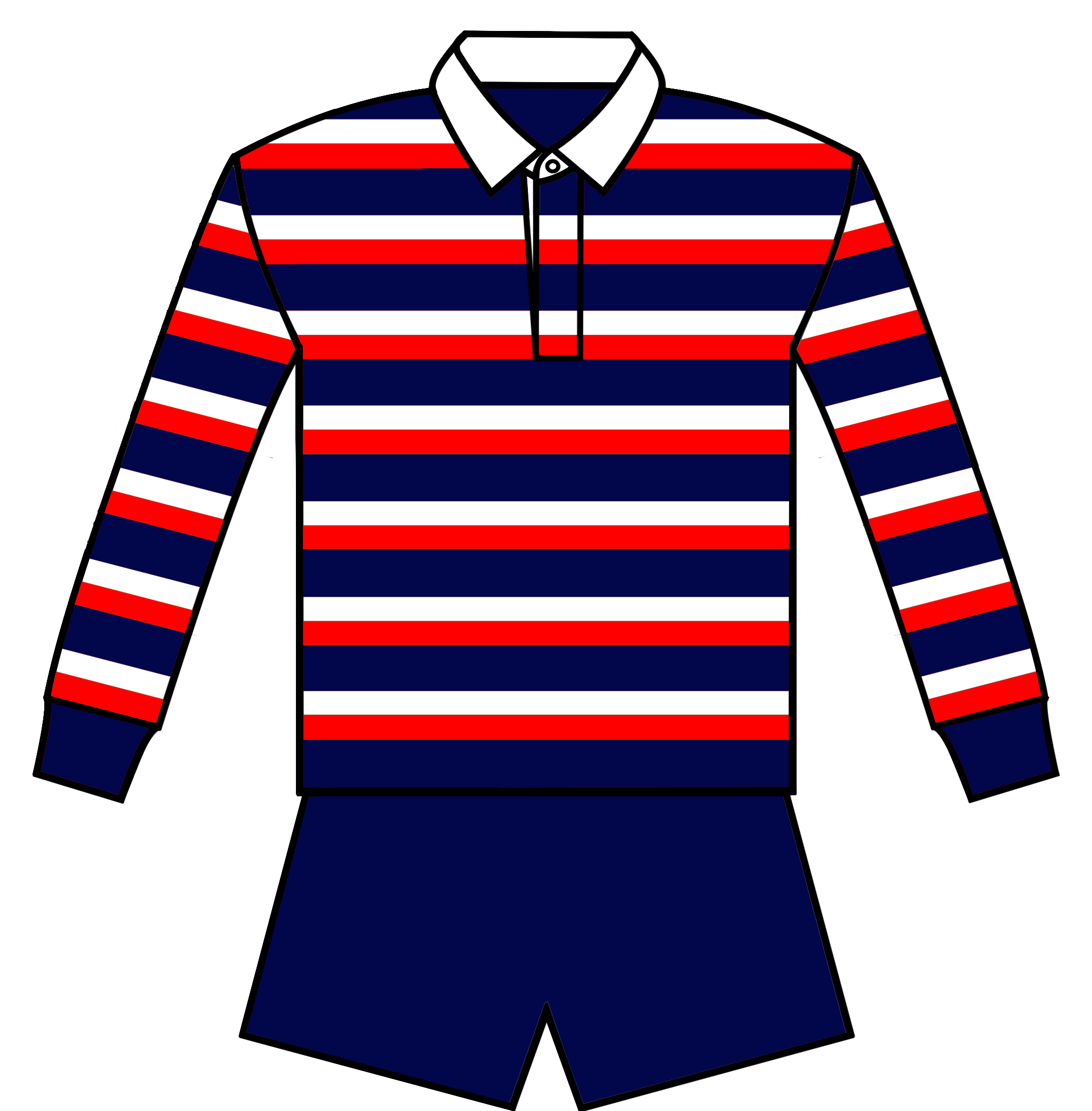
Eastern Suburbs 44th season Ground: Sydney Sports Ground; Coach: Ernie Norman; Captain: Alan Cook

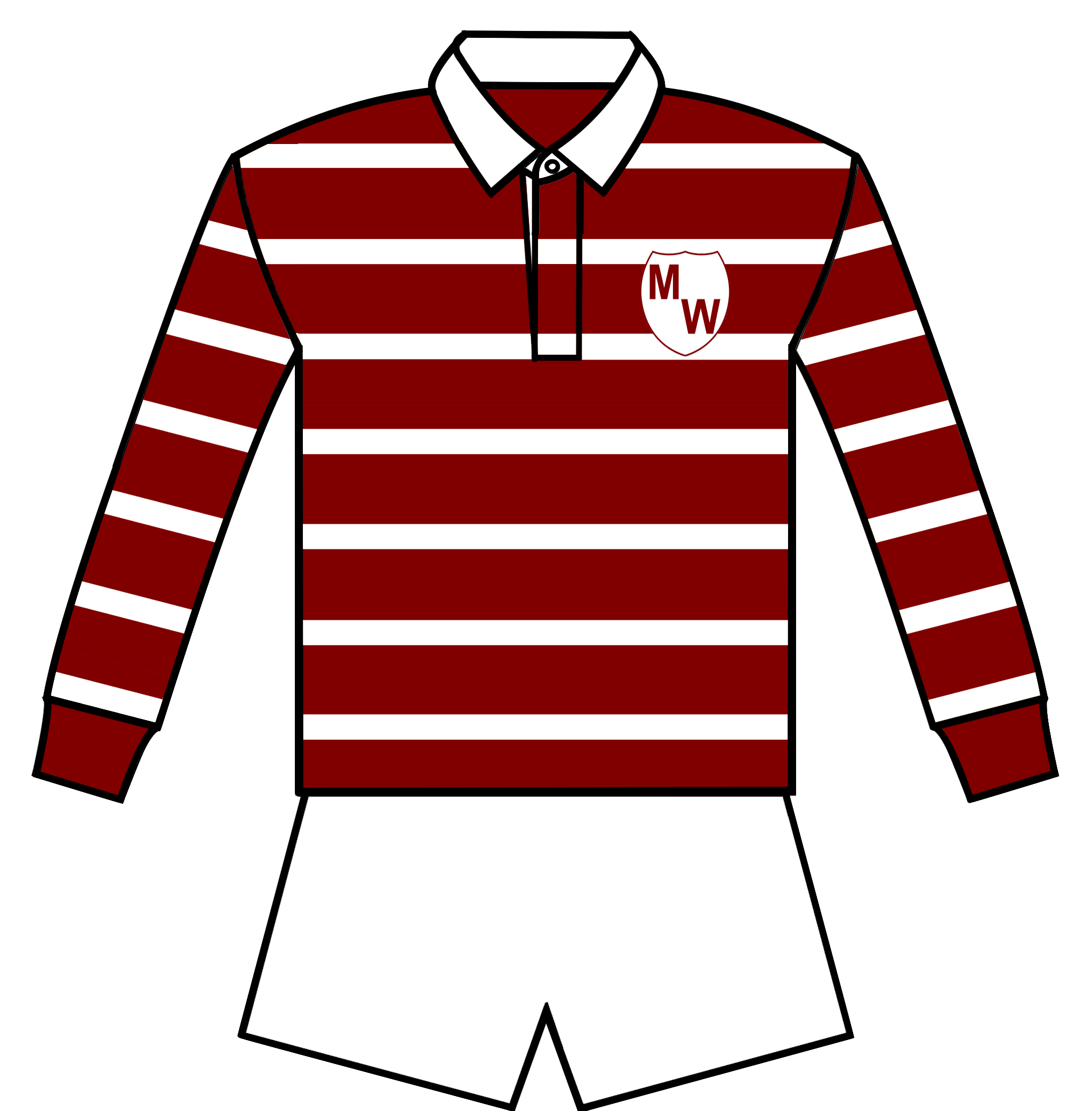
Manly-Warringah 5th season Ground: Brookvale Oval; Coach: Wally O'Connell; Captain: Kevin Schubert

Newtown 44th season Ground: Erskineville Oval; Captain-coach: Frank Farrell

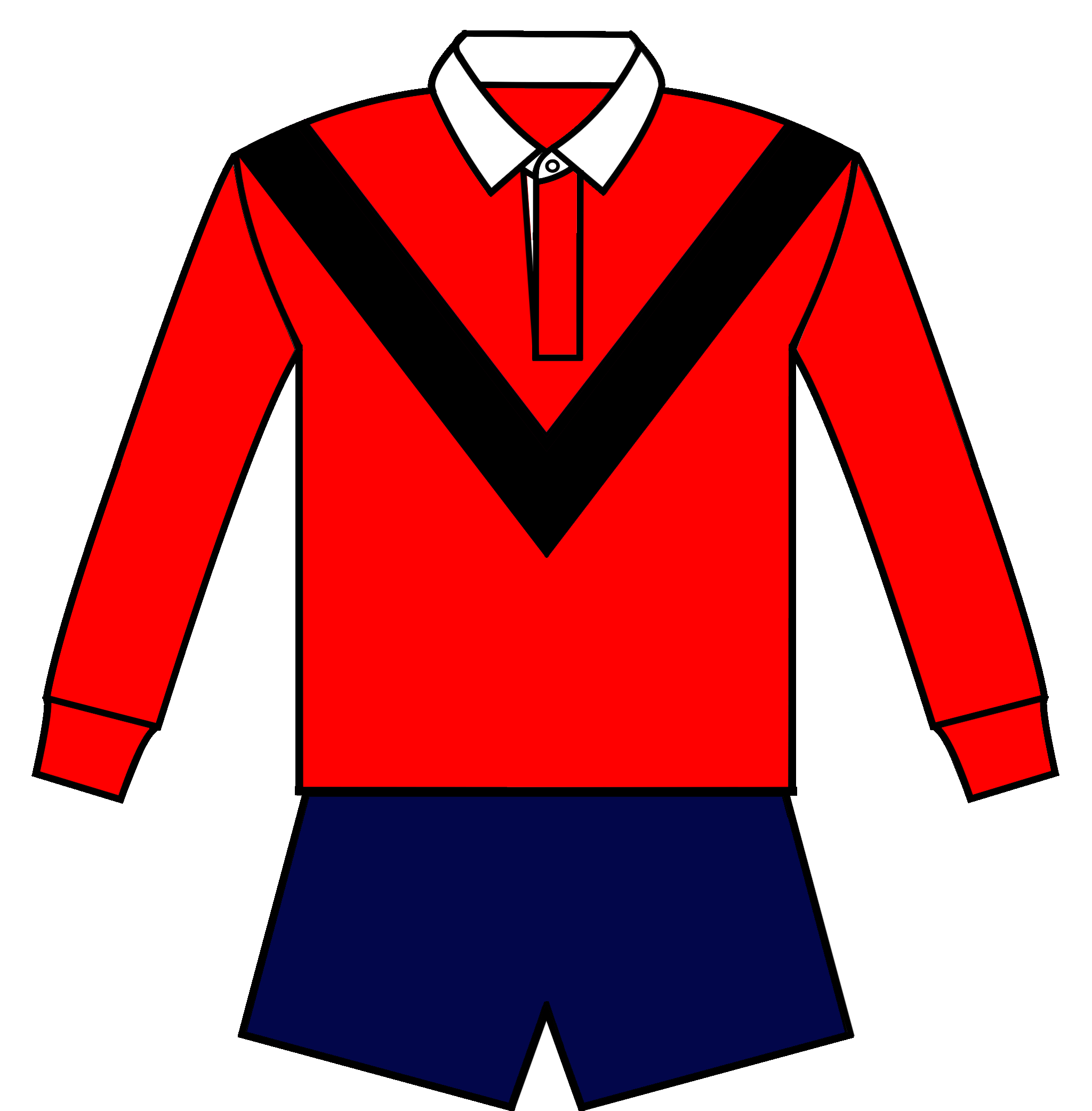
North Sydney 44th season Ground: North Sydney Oval; Coach: Laurie Doran; Captain: Bob Sullivan

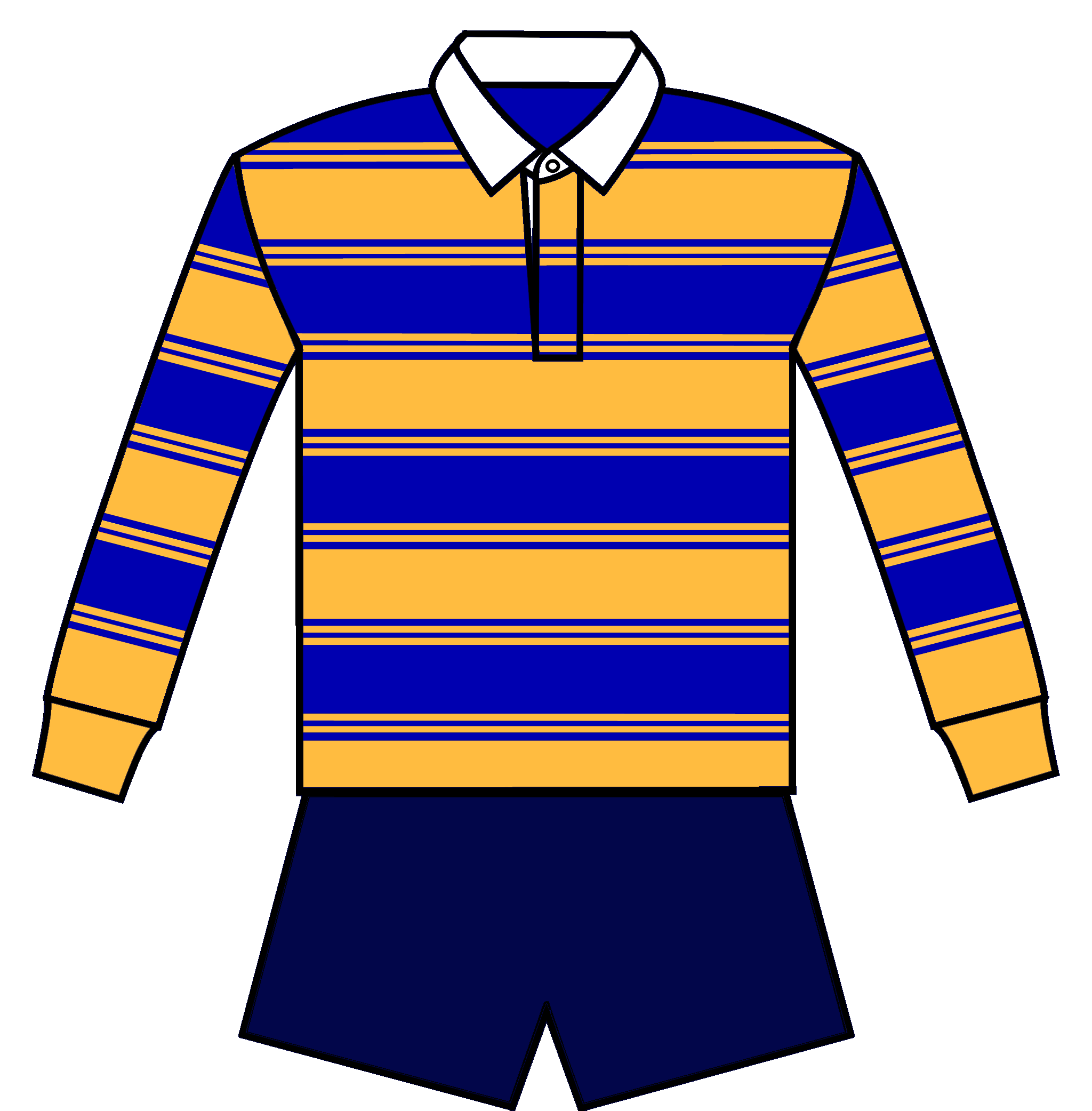
Parramatta 5th season Ground: Cumberland Oval; Coach: Vic Hey; Captain: Don Graham

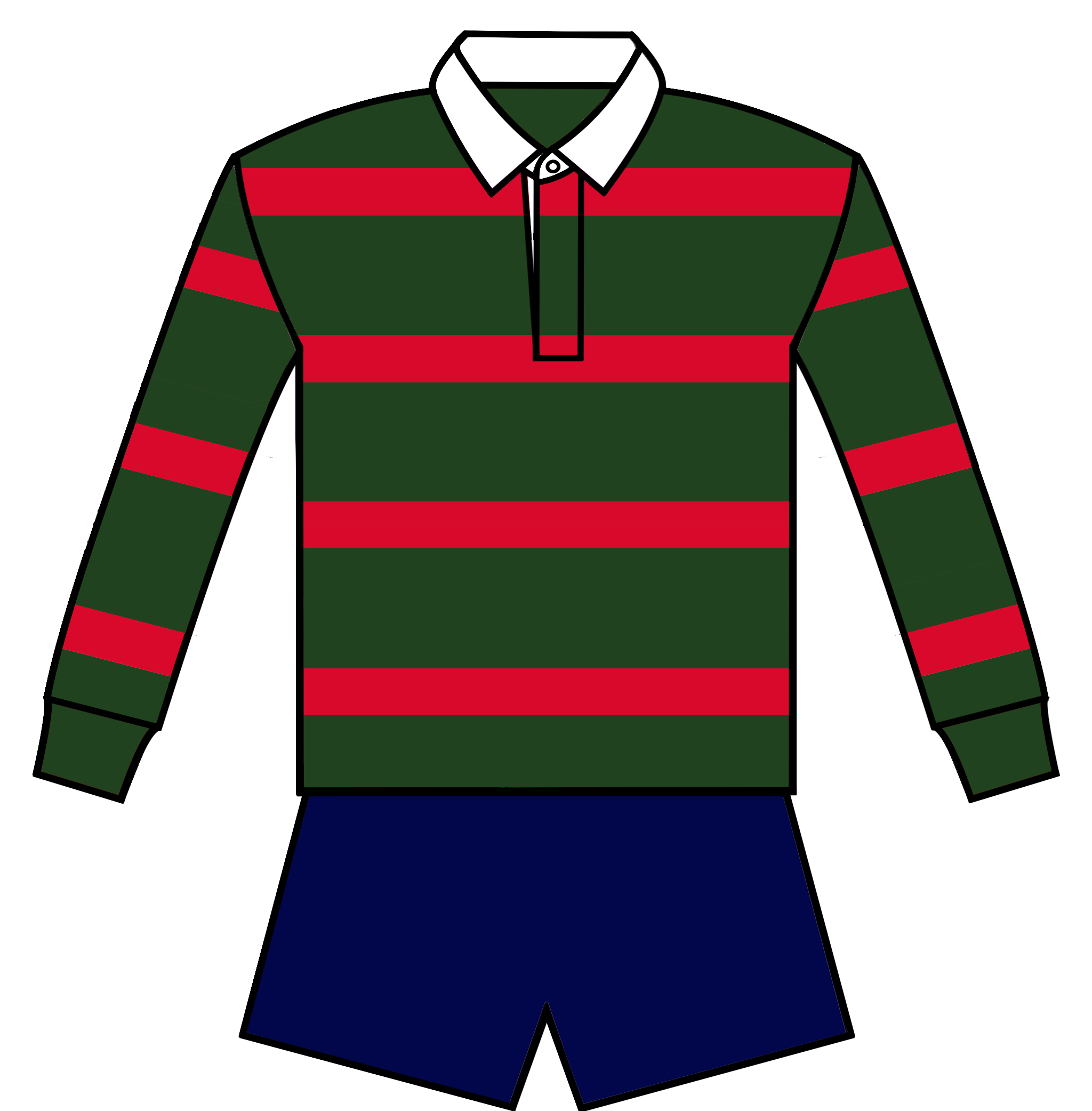
South Sydney 44th season Ground: Redfern Oval; Captain-coach: Jack Rayner

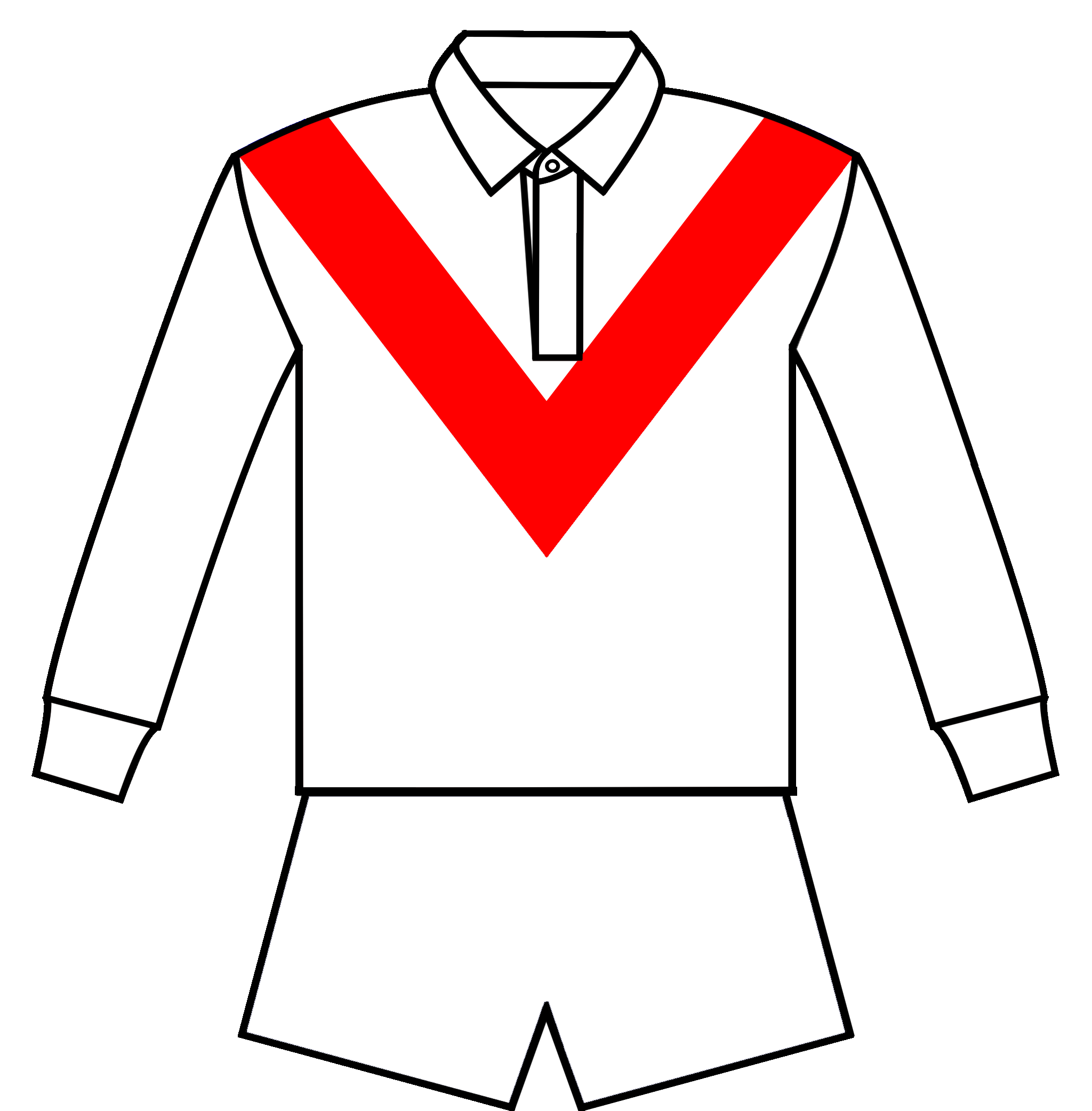
St. George 31st season Ground: Kogarah Jubilee Oval; Captain-coach: Johnny Hawke

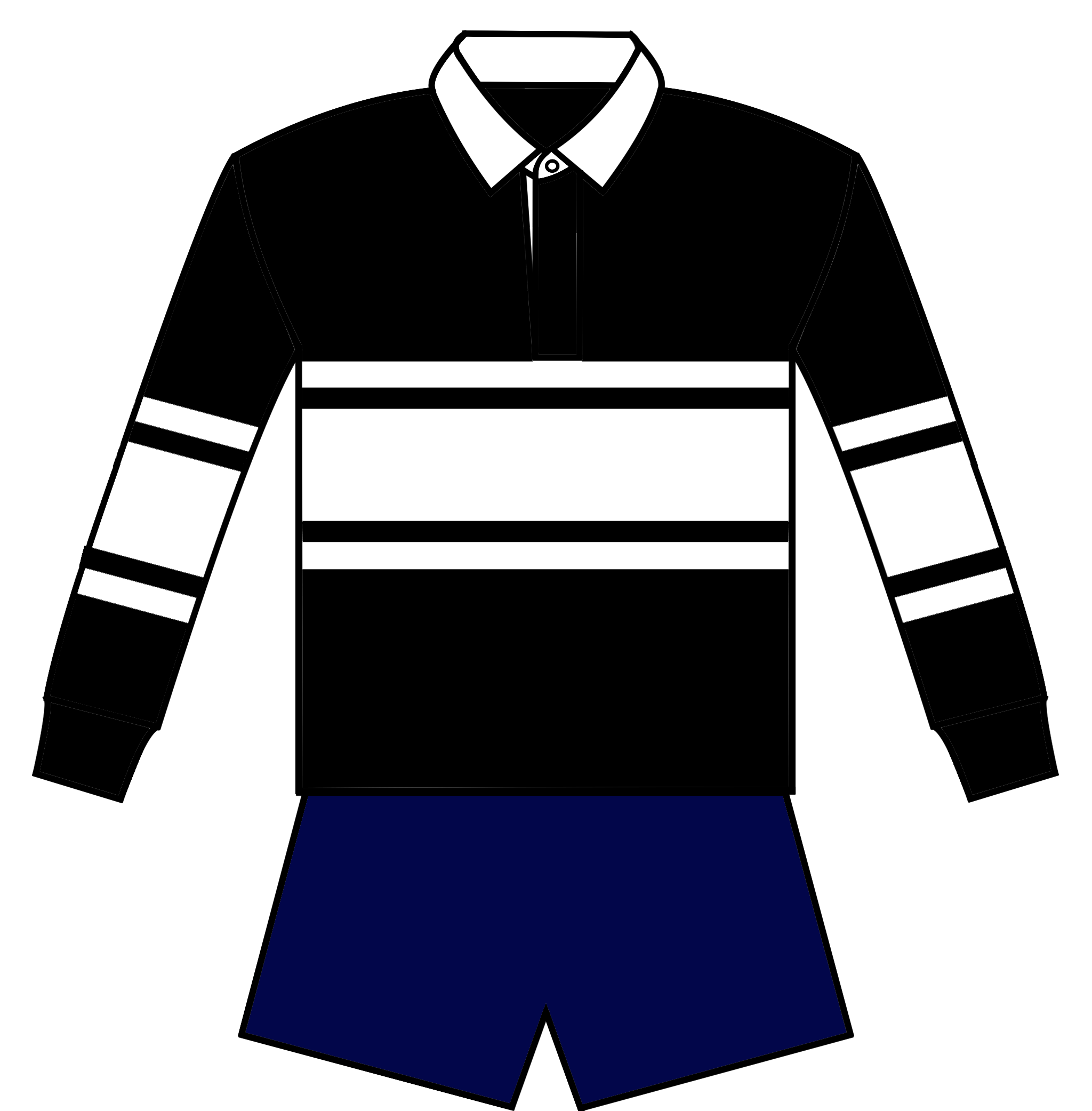
Western Suburbs 44th season Ground: Pratten Park; Coach: Jeff Smith; Captain: Peter McLean

== Ladder ==
| | Team | Pld | W | D | L | PF | PA | PD | Pts |
|---|---|---|---|---|---|---|---|---|---|
| 1 | South Sydney | 18 | 16 | 1 | 1 | 428 | 237 | +191 | 33 |
| 2 | Manly | 18 | 11 | 0 | 7 | 424 | 262 | +162 | 22 |
| 3 | St. George | 18 | 10 | 1 | 7 | 374 | 251 | +123 | 21 |
| 4 | Western Suburbs | 18 | 10 | 0 | 8 | 360 | 333 | +27 | 20 |
| 5 | Eastern Suburbs | 18 | 9 | 0 | 9 | 304 | 340 | -36 | 18 |
| 6 | Parramatta | 18 | 9 | 0 | 9 | 309 | 410 | -101 | 18 |
| 7 | Canterbury | 18 | 7 | 0 | 11 | 266 | 362 | -96 | 14 |
| 8 | Newtown | 18 | 6 | 0 | 12 | 261 | 341 | -80 | 12 |
| 9 | Balmain | 18 | 6 | 0 | 12 | 283 | 365 | -82 | 12 |
| 10 | North Sydney | 18 | 5 | 0 | 13 | 220 | 328 | -108 | 10 |

== Finals ==
Odds-on favourites to retain the premiership, Souths reserved their worst performance of the year for the semifinal against St. George, being trounced 35–8. This loss meant that a grand final would be necessary to determine the season's premiers. The next week, the Dragons were beaten by a gutsy Manly side in a preliminary final, 18–8. The infant Manly club thus qualified for its first grand final only five seasons after having entered the League in 1947.

| Home | Score | Away | Match Information |
| Home | Score | Away | Date and Time | Venue | Referee | Crowd |
|---|---|---|---|---|---|---|
Semifinals
| South Sydney | 8–35 | St. George | 1 September 1951 | Sydney Cricket Ground | Aub Oxford | 39,735 |
| Manly-Warringah | 37–9 | Western Suburbs | 8 September 1951 | Sydney Cricket Ground | George Bishop | 29,444 |
Preliminary Final
| Manly-Warringah | 18–8 | St. George | 15 September 1951 | Sydney Cricket Ground | George Bishop | 41,845 |
Final
| South Sydney | 42–14 | Manly-Warringah | 23 September 1951 | Sydney Sports Ground | Jack O'Brien | 28,505 |

=== Grand Final ===
==== Scheduling problems ====
By early August, the NSWRFL was aware that the coming summer's West Indies cricket tour meant they would be denied use of the SCG on Saturday, 22 September should a grand final be required. Initially it was believed that the League had paid a deposit of £125 to use the Sydney Showground on 22 September, but its transpired late in August that the NSWRFL had not done this and the Showground was actually booked by the NSWRU, (Note: The Union had a match between University and Eastern Suburbs deferred to 1 September, which extended its season beyond its originally scheduled finishing date of 15 September.) after a committee recommendation, and a declaration of unavailability for the NSWRU's usual finals venue of North Sydney Oval. It simultaneously became apparent that the Sports Ground was booked on 22 September for a soccer final.

As a consequence, the grand final had to be played on a Sunday (Note: 23 September) for the first time, despite the NSWRFL initially seeking another ground for Saturday, 22 September and denying it would play on a Sunday. The problems with the arrangement of the grand final this season would lead the NSWRFL to introduce a new finals system with a "mandatory" grand final whose date would be fixed before the season by negotiation with the SCG Trust.

==== Souths' record win ====
| South Sydney | Position | Manly-Warringah |
|---|---|---|
| 13. Clive Churchill | FB | 1. Ron Beaumont |
| 12. John Graves | WG | 2. Ron Rowles |
| 11. Kevin Woolfe | CE | 5. Gordon Willoughby |
| 10. Milton Atkinson | CE | 4. Warren Simmons |
| 34. Harry Wells | WG | 16. Jack Lumsden |
| 28. Norm Spillane | FE | 17. Jim Sullivan |
| 58. Ray Mason | HB | 7. Ken Arthurson |
| 1. Denis Donoghue | PR | 12. Roy Bull |
| 2. Ernie Hammerton | HK | 13. Kevin Schubert (c) |
| 3. Bryan Orrock | PR | 11. Fred Brown |
| 5. Bernie Purcell | SR | 10. Jack Hubbard |
| 4. Jack Rayner (Ca./Co.) | SR | 9. Sandy Herbert |
| 6. Les Cowie | LK | 8. George Hunter |
| | Coach | Wally O'Connell |

Manly were without former Test star and captain-coach Wally O'Connell who had a fractured bone in his wrist. The Sea Eagles were instead captained by hooker Kevin Schubert. Gordon Willoughby played out the match with his leg heavily strapped rather than leave his side further depleted but Manly’s hopes of upsetting the defending premiers were shattered in a spectacular display of attacking rugby league by Souths.

Manly's Ron Rowles and Gordon Willoughby trying to stop Souths Winger Johnny Graves from scoring the first of his four tries.

The smallest crowd for a final since 1944 was on hand at the Sports Ground to witness a one-sided game which Souths won 42–14. A highlight was Test winger John Graves' four tries – the only time this has been achieved in grand final history. Souths' 42 points remains the highest score made in a Grand Final.

Souths scored first through a penalty goal by Bernie Purcell and led 15–4 at the break. They then piled on twenty-seven points in the second-half. Tries to Clive Churchill, Ray Mason, Jack Rayner and Chick Cowie added to Graves' record haul. The Rabbitoh pack, led by front rower Denis Donoghue, dominated Manly’s forwards with Ernie Hammerton giving his team a feast of possession. Bernie Purcell landed seven goals from nine attempts and was also dynamic in attack, being chosen by The Sunday Herald judge, Frank McMillan as the man-of-the-match, for which he received a £10 reward.

Other records set include the most combined points scored in a grand final (56 total); the most tries scored by one team in a grand final (8), (Note: This mark was later matched by Eastern Suburbs in the 1975 Grand Final, and Manly in the 2008 NRL Grand Final)) the most goals scored in grand final by the winning team (9) and the most total combined goals scored in a Grand Final (13).

Manly 1951 Grand Finalists. Back Row - Sandy Herbert, Gordon Willoughby, Roy Bull, Jack Hubbard, Fred Brown, Warren Simmons. Front Row - Ron Beaumont, Ken Arthurson, Jim Sullivan, Kevin Schubert (c), George Hunter, Ron Rowles, Jack Lumsden. Ball Boy W. Sullivan

South Sydney Rabbitohs 42
Tries: Graves (4), Churchill, Mason, Rayner, Cowie
Goals: Purcell (7), Hammerton, Donoghue.

Manly-Warringah Sea Eagles 14
Tries: Lumsden (2)
Goals: Rowles (4)

== Player statistics ==
The following statistics are as of the conclusion of Round 18.

Top 5 point scorers

| Points | Player | Tries | Goals | Field Goals |
|---|---|---|---|---|
| 199 | Ron Rowles | 11 | 83 | 0 |
| 183 | Noel Pidding | 13 | 72 | 0 |
| 128 | Johnny Graves | 22 | 31 | 0 |
| 117 | Don Worne | 1 | 57 | 0 |
| 115 | Ian Johnston | 13 | 38 | 0 |

Top 5 try scorers

| Tries | Player |
|---|---|
| 22 | Johnny Graves |
| 18 | Mitchell Wallace |
| 13 | Noel Pidding |
| 13 | Ian Johnston |
| 12 | Kevin Woolfe |
| 12 | Ron Roberts |
| 12 | Jack Troy |
| 12 | John McClean |

Top 5 goal scorers

| Goals | Player |
|---|---|
| 83 | Ron Rowles |
| 72 | Noel Pidding |
| 57 | Don Worne |
| 46 | Joe Jorgenson |
| 45 | Ron Willey |
