= Wadling =

Wadling is a surname. Notable people with the surname include:

- Freddie Wadling (1951–2016), Swedish singer and actor
- Len Wadling, Australian rugby league footballer

== Other ==
- Tarn Wadling, lake of England
