= Halden (disambiguation) =

Halden is a town and municipality in Norway.

Halden may also refer to:

== Related to Halden, Norway ==
- Halden (newspaper), a newspaper 1882–1941
- Halden Canal
- Halden Prison
- Halden Reactor
- Halden Stadion, a multi-purpose stadium
- Halden Station, a railway station
- Halden HK, a women's handball club
- Halden SK, a multi-sport club

== Places ==
- Halden, Rolvenden, a historic manor in Kent, England
- Halden Township, St. Louis County, Minnesota, U.S.

== People and characters ==
- Berry F. Halden, American politician in the 1936 United States Senate special election in Iowa
- Clint Halden (born 1981), Australian rugby league footballer
- John Halden (born 1954), Australian politician
- Judge Halden, a fictional character in the Saw film franchise

== Public art ==
- Halden Sculptures, public art atop slag piles in the Ruhr region of Germany
