= Gillmer =

Gillmer is a surname. Notable people with the surname include:

- Bruce Gillmer, American film producer
- Caroline Gillmer (born 1955), Australian actress
- Merv Gillmer, Australian rugby league footballer
- Reuben Gillmer, British screenwriter
- Thomas C. Gillmer
