= Damien Brown =

Damien Brown may refer to:

- Damien Brown (soccer) (born 1975), Australian football player
- Damien Brown (fighter) (born 1984), Australian mixed martial artist

== See also ==
- Damian Brown (born 1970), Australian weightlifter
- Damian Browne (born 1980), Irish rugby union player
- Damian Browne (rugby league) (born 1975), Australian rugby league player
