= Jim Richards (rugby league) =

Australian rugby league player

Personal information
- Full name: James Richards
- Born: 1928; Sydney, New South Wales, Australia
- Died: 8 May 2007 (aged 78–79); Sydney, New South Wales, Australia

Playing information
- Position: Prop
Club
Years	Team	Pld	T	G	FG	P
1953–57	South Sydney	75	4	0	0	12
1958	Newtown	12	2	0	0	6
	Total	87	6	0	0	18
- Relatives: Stephen Knight (nephew); Richie Powell (nephew)

Jim Richards (1928-2007) was an Australian rugby league footballer who played in the 1950s. He played for South Sydney in the New South Wales Rugby League (NSWRL) competition during the club's second golden era where they won 5 premierships in 6 seasons from 1950 to 1955. Richards also played for Newtown late in his career.

== Playing career ==
Richards made his first grade debut for South Sydney in 1953. Richards played for Souths in the 1953 NSWRL grand final against St George which South Sydney won convincingly 31–12 at the Sydney Cricket Ground in front of 44,581 spectators.

The following year, Richards played for Souths in the 1954 NSWRL grand final against Newtown. Newtown finished as minor premiers that season but in the final Souths proved to be too strong winning 23–15.

In 1955, Richards played 20 times for Souths but missed out playing in the club's third successive grand final and premiership victory against Newtown due to injury.

In 1956, South Sydney reached the preliminary final against Balmain but fell short of a 7th grand final appearance in a row losing in a high scoring match 36–33. Richards was also sent off in this game.

In 1958, Richards departed South Sydney and joined Newtown. He played with the club for 1 season making 12 appearances before retiring.
