= Peter Rowles =

Australian rugby union & league footballer

Personal information
- Full name: Peter George Rowles
- Born: 18 November 1952 (age 72); Wollongong, New South Wales

Playing information

Rugby union
- Position: fly-half
Representative
Years	Team	Pld	T	G	FG	P
1972–73	Wallabies	2				0

Rugby league
Club
Years	Team	Pld	T	G	FG	P
1977–78	Western Suburbs	41	10	127	0	288
1979	Newtown Jets	10	2	9	0	24
1980	Western Suburbs	6	1	16	0	35
	Total	57	13	152	0	347
- Father: Ron Rowles

Peter George Rowles (born 18 November 1952) is an Australian former rugby union and professional rugby league footballer who played in the 1970s and 1980s. In union he represented Australia and in league he played in the NSWRFL Premiership for the Western Suburbs and Newtown clubs.

Son of record-breaking Manly-Warringah rugby league player Ron Rowles, Peter, a fly-half, was born in Wollongong, New South Wales and claimed a total of 2 international rugby caps for Australia.

Peter Rowles switched to playing rugby league in the mid-1970s, playing 2 seasons of reserve grade with Manly-Warringah before switching to play three seasons with the Western Suburbs Magpies in 1977, 1978 and 1980. In 1978 Rowles set the Western Suburbs club's record for most points in a season with 215 (8 tries, 94 goals, 3 field goals). He switched to Newtown Jets in 1979. Peter Rowles retired in 1981.
