= Richie Powell (rugby league) =

Australian rugby league footballer

Personal information
- Full name: Richard Gordon Powell
- Born: 17 January 1939 Waterloo, New South Wales, Australia
- Died: 20 August 2019 (aged 80)

Playing information
- Position: Prop
Club
Years	Team	Pld	T	G	FG	P
1958–67	South Sydney	97	10	0	0	30
- Source: As of 6 December 2022
- Relatives: Jim Richards (uncle); Stephen Knight (cousin)

Richie Powell (1939–2019) was an Australian professional rugby league footballer who played in the 1950s and 1960s. He played for the South Sydney in the New South Wales Rugby League (NSWRL) competition.

== Playing career ==
Powell made his first grade debut for South Sydney in round 1 of the 1958 NSWRL season against Western Suburbs at the Sydney Cricket Ground. A serious shoulder dislocation keep Powell out of the 1959 and 1960 seasons. In 1964, Powell won the 1964 Sun-Herald award for best and fairest player in the NSWRL competition. Powell played 16 games for Souths in the 1965 season but was not including in the clubs finals campaign or 1965 NSWRL grand final against St. George. Powell retired at the end of the 1967 NSWRL season.
