= Robbie Parker =

Australian rugby league footballer (born 1948)

Personal information
- Full name: Robert John Parker
- Born: 13 September 1948 (age 77) Sydney, NSW, Australia

Playing information
- Position: Centre, Wing
Club
Years	Team	Pld	T	G	FG	P
1973–76	Western Suburbs	82	19	0	0	57
1977	Manly Warringah	4	0	0	0	0
	Total	86	19	0	0	57

Robert John Parker (born 13 September 1948) is an Australian former rugby league footballer.

Born in Sydney, Parker was educated at Manly High School, where he played rugby union and earned Combined High Schools representative honours. He was a high school teammate of future dual–code international Stephen Knight. During his schoolboy years, Parker developed his rugby league playing for the Manly-Warringah juniors on the weekend. He was also associated with the Manly Surf Club and won a NSW beach sprint championship.

Parker, a sports master by profession, spent his early career with the Manly RUFC. He was capped for an Australian XV against Fiji, made a Colts tour of Japan and represented the New South Wales Waratahs. After being overlooked for further representative honours, Parker switched to rugby league in 1973 and joined Western Suburbs. He often formed a centre combination with his old schoolmate Knight and also appeared occasionally as a winger. From 1973 to 1976, Parker made 82 first–grade appearances with Western Suburbs. He moved on to reigning premiers Manly for the 1977 NSWRFL season.
