= Peter Cross (rugby league) =

Rugby league footballer

Personal information
- Full name: Peter Cross
- Born: 8 August 1958 (age 66)

Playing information
- Position: Second-row
Club
| Years | Team | Pld | T | G | FG | P |
|---|---|---|---|---|---|---|
| 1979–86 | North Sydney Bears | 91 | 4 | 0 | 0 | 15 |

Peter Cross is a former professional rugby league footballer who played in the 1970s and 80s. He is the brother of former Manly player, Greg Cross.
