= Kevin Woolfe =

Australian rugby league footballer

Personal information
- Full name: Kevin Joseph Woolfe
- Born: 23 September 1930 Sydney, New South Wales, Australia
- Died: 19 October 2002 Sydney, New South Wales, Australia

Playing information
Club
| Years | Team | Pld | T | G | FG | P |
|---|---|---|---|---|---|---|
| 1950–54 | South Sydney | 78 | 28 | 8 | 0 | 100 |

Kevin Woolfe (1930–2002) was an Australian rugby league footballer who played in the 1950s. He was a triple premiership winner with South Sydney Rabbitohs.

Kevin Woolfe was a Souths junior from Mascot, New South Wales, and went on to play five seasons with South Sydney Rabbitohs between 1950 and 1955. He won three premierships with Souths during his time there; 1950, 1951 and 1953. He retired from first grade football after the 1955 NSWRFL season.

Kevin Woolfe died on 19 October 2002 aged 72.
