= Ron Rowles =

Australian rugby league footballer (1928–2017)

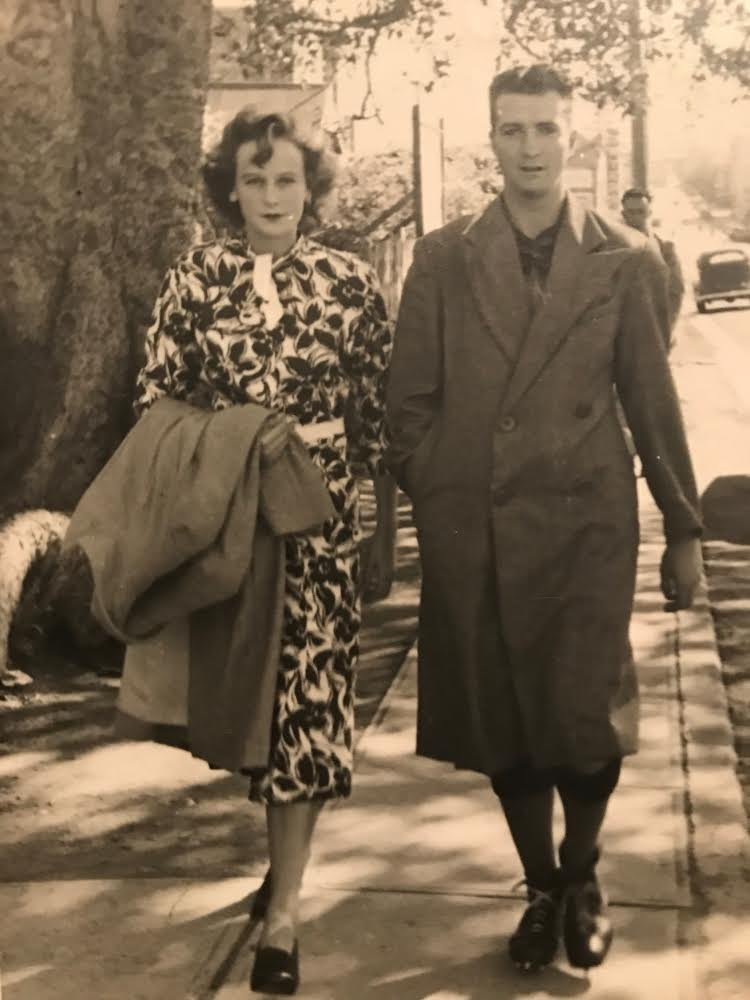
- Ron Rowles with wife

Personal information
- Full name: Ronald George Rowles
- Born: 12 February 1928 Wollongong, New South Wales, Australia
- Died: 3 June 2017 (aged 89) Wollongong, New South Wales, Australia

Playing information
- Position: Wing
Club
Years	Team	Pld	T	G	FG	P
1950–54	Manly-Warringah	81	46	352	0	842
Representative
Years	Team	Pld	T	G	FG	P
1948–49	Country NSW	2	1	2	?	7
- Relatives: Peter Rowles (son)

Ron Rowles (12 February 1928 in Wollongong, New South Wales–3 June 2017) was an Australian rugby league footballer who played in the 1940s and 1950s, he was a goal-kicking wing whose club career was played with the Manly-Warringah for whom he set a number of point-scoring records in the 1950s.

== Playing career ==
Originally a Wollongong / Illawarra junior, Ron Rowles was to become one of the greatest point scorers for Sydney's Manly-Warringah club. He played in Manly's maiden grand final in 1951 and played five first grade seasons with the club between 1950 and 1954.

== Point scoring records ==
He was the first Manly player to top 100 points in a season and was the season's leading point-scorer in four successive years; 1951 (11t, 83g - 199 pts), 1952 (8t, 77g - 178 pts), 1953 (8t, 64g - 152 pts) and 1954 (13t, 92g - 223 pts).

He scored a club record 30 points (4t, 9g) in a match against Canterbury in 1954. He starred in a Possibles vs. Probables trial for the 1948-49 Kangaroos, but it was 'a travesty that he never played for his state or Australia'.

He was the second highest point scorer in Manly-Warringah Sea Eagles history, scoring 842 points during his career at the club.

Ron Rowles was the father of the former rugby union and rugby league footballer Peter Rowles.
