= Richard Kairouz =

Australian rugby league footballer

Playing information
- Position: Wing
Club
| Years | Team | Pld | T | G | FG | P |
|---|---|---|---|---|---|---|
| 1993 | Manly Sea Eagles | 2 | 0 | 0 | 0 | 0 |
| 1994 | Eastern Suburbs | 10 | 3 | 0 | 0 | 12 |
| | Total | 12 | 3 | 0 | 0 | 12 |

Richard Kairouz is an Australian former professional rugby league footballer who played for Manly Sea Eagles and Eastern Suburbs.

A winger, Kairouz started his career at Manly and broke into the first-grade side late in the 1993 NSWRL season, making two appearances off the bench. He moved to Eastern Suburbs in 1994 and played ten first-grade games that season, starting eight of them on the wing.

Kairouz is of Lebanese descent and represented Lebanon in the World Sevens competition.
