= Ray Mason =

Australian rugby league footballer

Personal information
- Full name: Raymond Mason
- Died: 2003

Playing information
- Position: Halfback
Club
Years	Team	Pld	T	G	FG	P
1951–57	South Sydney	90	6	0	0	18

Ray Mason was an Australian rugby league footballer who played in the 1950s for South Sydney as a halfback. He played for the club during their golden era in the 1950s, when the club won 5 premierships with Mason being a member in 3 of those premiership victories.

== Club career ==
Mason began his first grade career in 1951. That year, Mason won his first premiership with Souths as they defeated Manly 42–14 at the Sydney Cricket Ground. Mason missed out playing in the following year's grand final against Western Suburbs due to injury. He was a member of the Souths sides which won the premiership in 1953 and 1954, defeating St George and Newtown respectively. Mason played on with Souths for 3 more years, but was not a member of the 1955 premiership winning side which defeated Newtown 12–11.

== Later life ==
Mason coached the third grade South Sydney side from 1958 to 1965, and guided them to a premiership in 1963. He was made a life member of the club in 1965, and served as a committee member. Mason later became director of the South Sydney leagues club for seven years.
