= Peter Gallagher (rugby league, born 1941) =

Australian rugby league footballer

Personal information
- Full name: Peter Terence Gallagher
- Born: 15 April 1941 Taree, New South Wales, Australia
- Died: 19 September 2015 (aged 74) Taree, New South Wales, Australia

Playing information
- Position: Centre, Five-eighth, Wing
Club
Years	Team	Pld	T	G	FG	P
1960–65	Easts	87	9	2	0	31
1966–68	Manly Warringah	36	8	0	0	24
	Total	123	17	2	0	55

Peter Gallagher (15 April 1941 – 15 September 2015) was an Australian rugby league footballer. He played in the New South Wales Rugby Football League premiership for the Eastern Suburbs club from 1960 until 1965. He played mainly at centre but was a versatile player who could play most positions in the backline. In the 1965 season, Gallagher captained the Eastern Suburbs team and was a member of the Easts side that lost to St. George in the 1960 Grand Final. The following year Gallagher moved to the Manly club, remaining there until 1968. In his time at Manly Gallagher played most of his football on the Wing.

== Background ==
Peter Gallagher was born in Taree, New South Wales, Australia.
