= Nathan Hollingsworth =

Australian rugby player (born 1978)

Personal information
- Born: 3 August 1978 (age 47) Canberra, A.C.T., Australia

Playing information
- Position: Hooker
Club
Years	Team	Pld	T	G	FG	P
2002	Parramatta Eels	5	1	0	0	4
2004	Manly Sea Eagles	11	0	0	0	0
	Total	16	1	0	0	4

Coaching information
Club
Years	Team	Gms	W	D	L	W%
2006	Connecticut Wildcats	0	0	0	0
- Source: As of 28 March 2021

Nathan Hollingsworth (born 3 August 1978) is an Australian former professional rugby league footballer who played for Parramatta and Manly-Warringah in the National Rugby League (NRL).

A Canberra raised player, Hollingsworth started his career with the Raiders, representing the club in the lower grades.

Hollingsworth, who played as a hooker, received his opportunity to play first-grade when he joined Parramatta. Late in the 2002 NRL season, he replaced an injured Daniel Irvine and kept his spot on the team for the remainder of the season, which included the qualifying final loss to the Brisbane Broncos.

In 2004, he switched to Manly and featured in 11 first-grade games that season.

== Coaching ==
He coached the Connecticut Wildcats in the US in 2006 for one season.
