= Nick Yakich =

Australian rugby league footballer (1940–2019)

Personal information
- Full name: Nick Yakich
- Born: 18 January 1940 Innisfail, Queensland, Australia
- Died: 28 May 2019 (aged 79) Warriewood, New South Wales, Australia

Playing information
- Position: Wing
Club
Years	Team	Pld	T	G	FG	P
1960–66	Manly Sea Eagles	74	52	0	0	156
Representative
Years	Team	Pld	T	G	FG	P
1965	New South Wales	3	4	0	0	12
- Relatives: Fred Yakich (brother)

Nick Yakich (18 January 1940 – 28 May 2019) was an Australian rugby league footballer for the Manly-Warringah Sea Eagles in the New South Wales Rugby League premiership competition.<refname=RLP> His position of choice was on the wing.

== Early life ==
Nick Yakich, the son of a Croatian immigrant who stowed away on a ship bound for Perth in the 1920s, moved to Mossman (Qld) in the late 1940s. From there he moved to Sydney where he attended Marist Brothers North Shore (Mosman) with future rugby league star winger Ken Irvine. He then attended Newcastle Teachers College with his brother Fred (also a future Sea Eagle). After graduating he was posted to Harbord Primary School on Sydney's Northern Beaches, right in the heart of the Sea Eagles area and trialled with Manly at the instigation of cricket team mate, and Manly junior, Frank Stanton. He later taught PE at Pittwater High School at Mona Vale.

== Playing career ==
Yakich was graded with the Sea Eagles as a winger in 1960, immediately impressing with his speed and try scoring ability in open play. He went on to play in a total of 74 games with the club between 1960 and 1966, scoring 52 tries. His best season in the NSWRFL was 1964 when he crossed for 16 tries, only two behind the season's leading try scorer, St. George's test centre Reg Gasnier.

During his time with Manly, Yakich was considered one of the fastest players in rugby league behind only North Sydney's Ken Irvine and South Sydney's 1962 Commonwealth Games 100 yards Bronze Medallist, Michael Cleary. Yakich was also unlucky not to play more than three games for New South Wales (NSW) during his career, regularly competing with test wingers Irvine, Cleary, Johnny King and Eddie Lumsden (both from the record setting St. George Dragons of the 1960s) for a place in the side.

Yakich played all of his three games for NSW in 1965, scoring a try on each occasion. Following the interstate series (won 4-0 by NSW), he was called up to the Australian squad to tour New Zealand, but was unable to displace Irvine and Cleary from the test team and only played in minor games on tour, though he was the squad's leading try scorer on tour with 6 tries.

Yakich's rugby league career came to a premature end in 1966 when he suffered a major knee injury playing against Souths which required surgery. He retired for good in 1967 after suffering a shoulder injury whilst captain-coach of Werris Creek in northern New South Wales.

== Beach Sprinting ==
Yakich was a sprinting protege' of former Manly, NSW and Australian winger Johnny Bliss, who had also won a record 12 Australian Beach Sprint championships. Yakich would go on to win 5 Australian championships with the North Narrabeen Surf Club before his knee injury suffered in 1966 forced his retirement.

== Career playing statistics ==
=== Point scoring summary ===
Games	Tries	Goals	F/G	Points
74	52	-	-	208

=== Matches played ===
Team	Matches	Years
Manly Sea Eagles	74	1960–1966
New South Wales	3	1965

== Sources ==
- Whiticker, Alan & Hudson, Glen (2006) The Encyclopedia of Rugby League Players, Gavin Allen Publishing, Sydney
