= Greg Cross =

Rugby league footballer

Personal information
- Full name: Greg Cross

Playing information
Club
Years	Team	Pld	T	G	FG	P
1978–79	Manly-Warringah Sea Eagles	4	0	0	0	0

Greg Cross is a former professional rugby league footballer who played in the 1970s. He is the brother of former North Sydney Bears second-row, Peter Cross.
