= Fred Yakich =

Australian rugby league footballer

Personal information
- Full name: Frederick Yakich
- Born: 10 December 1941 (age 84) Sydney, New South Wales, Australia

Playing information
- Position: Centre
Club
Years	Team	Pld	T	G	FG	P
1963–66	Manly	40	14	0	0	42
- As of 12 Jul 2021
- Relatives: Nick Yakich (brother)

Fred Yakich (born 10 December 1941 in Sydney, New South Wales) is an Australian former rugby league footballer for the Manly in the New South Wales Rugby League premiership competition.
