= Stephen Knight (rugby) =

Australian dual-code international rugby player

Steve Knight
- Born: Stephen Oliver Knight; 24 July 1948 (age 78) Manly, New South Wales
- University: University of Sydney

Rugby union career
- Position: centre
Amateur team(s)
Years	Team	Apps	(Points)
1966–71	Manly RUFC		
International career
Years	Team	Apps	(Points)
1969–71	Australia	6	(3)
- Rugby league career

Playing information
- Position: Three-quarter
Club
Years	Team	Pld	T	G	FG	P
1972–75	Wests	73				75
1976–77	Balmain	37				42
1978–79	Manly-Warringah	32				30
	Total	142	0	0	0	147
Representative
Years	Team	Pld	T	G	FG	P
1972	Australia	2				0
- Relatives: Jim Richards (uncle); Richie Powell (cousin)

Stephen Oliver Knight (born 24 July 1948 in Manly, New South Wales) is an Australian former rugby union and professional rugby league footballer - a dual code international. He played as a winger or centre.

== Rugby union ==
Knight's rugby union career was with the Manly club in Sydney. He represented the Wallabies on six occasions between 1969 and 1971, once against Scotland and five times against South Africa. Knight's international debut was against South Africa on the Wallabies' 1969 tour and he met them again during the tumultuous Springbok tour of 1971 that resulted in a groundswell of anti-apartheid expression by Australian demonstrators. He earned a seventh international rugby union cap as a member of a Presidents XV against England in 1970.

== Rugby league ==
Knight switched to rugby league in 1972, joining the Western Suburbs Magpies. He was selected to represent Australia at rugby league for the 1972 World Cup and played in two pool games against Great Britain and New Zealand. His international rugby league debut against Great Britain saw him become Australia's 465th Kangaroo and 36th dual code rugby international behind Hawthorne and Brass and preceding Geoff Richardson. Knight finished his club career with the Manly Sea Eagles. He was a member of the 1978 premiership side that drew the Grand Final against the Cronulla Sharks and won the replay which had to be played just three days later due to the upcoming 1978 Kangaroo tour.

Knight graduated from Sydney Teachers College in 1972 with a diploma in physical education.
