= Sandy Herbert =

Australian rugby league footballer

Personal information
- Full name: John Percival Herbert

Playing information
- Position: Second-row
Club
Years	Team	Pld	T	G	FG	P
1948–53	Manly-Warringah	60	5	0	0	15
- Source: As of 28 March 2019

Sandy "Jack" Herbert an Australian professional rugby league footballer who played in the 1940s and 1950s. He played for Manly-Warringah in the NSWRL competition.

== Playing career ==
Herbert made his first grade debut for Manly-Warringah in 1948. Between 1948 and 1950, Manly struggled towards the bottom of the table.

In 1951, Manly finished second on the table and reached their first finals campaign. Manly went on to reach the 1951 NSWRL grand final against South Sydney. Herbert played at second-row as Souths comprehensively beat Manly 42–14 in the final which was played at the Sydney Sports Ground. At the time this was the highest scoring grand final since 1908. Herbert retired from rugby league following the conclusion of the 1953 season.
