= Merv Gillmer =

Australian rugby league footballer

Personal information
- Full name: Mervyn James Gillmer
- Born: 11 October 1923 Erskineville, New South Wales, Australia
- Died: 20 September 2016 (aged 92) Sydney, New South Wales, Australia

Playing information
- Position: Five-eighth, Centre
Club
Years	Team	Pld	T	G	FG	P
1947–49	Manly-Warringah	21	2	38	0	82
- Source: As of 27 March 2019

Mervyn James Gillmer (11 October 1923 – 20 September 2016) was an Australian professional rugby league footballer who played in the 1940s. He played for Manly-Warringah in the NSWRL competition. Gillmer was a foundation player for Manly-Warringah featuring in the club's first season and first game.

== Background ==
Gillmer grew up in Leichhardt and played with the local Brookvale rugby league club before serving in the Australian Army for 2 years during World War II.

== Playing career ==
Gillmer played in Manly's first ever game on April 12, 1947, against Western Suburbs at Brookvale Oval. Manly lost the game 15-13 even though Manly had scored more tries than Wests. Gillmer is credited with kicking the first goals for the club.

Manly would go on to finish second last on the table above Parramatta during their inaugural year avoiding the wooden spoon by 2 competition points. In 1948, Gillmer finished as the club's top point scorer as Manly finished second last again avoiding the wooden spoon by a single competition point. Gillmer retired at the end of the 1949 season.
