= Warren Simmons =

Australian rugby league footballer (1930–2020)

Personal information
- Full name: Warren Simmons
- Born: 1 January 1930
- Died: 10 November 2020 (aged 90)

Playing information
- Position: Centre
Club
Years	Team	Pld	T	G	FG	P
1950–54	Manly-Warringah	37	11	0	0	33
- Source: As of 28 March 2019

Warren Simmons (1930–2020) was an Australian professional rugby league footballer who played in the 1950s. He played for Manly-Warringah in the NSWRL competition.

== Playing career ==
Simmons made his first grade debut for Manly-Warringah in 1950. In 1951, Manly finished second on the table and reached their first finals campaign. Manly went on to reach the 1951 NSWRL grand final against South Sydney. Simmons played at centre as Souths comprehensively beat Manly 42–14 in the final which was played at the Sydney Sports Ground. At the time this was the highest scoring grand final since 1908.

Following the grand final defeat, Manly were unable to maintain the momentum of the 1951 season and fell back down the ladder in the following years. Simmons played with Manly until the end of the 1954 season before retiring.
