= Clint Halden =

Australian rugby league footballer

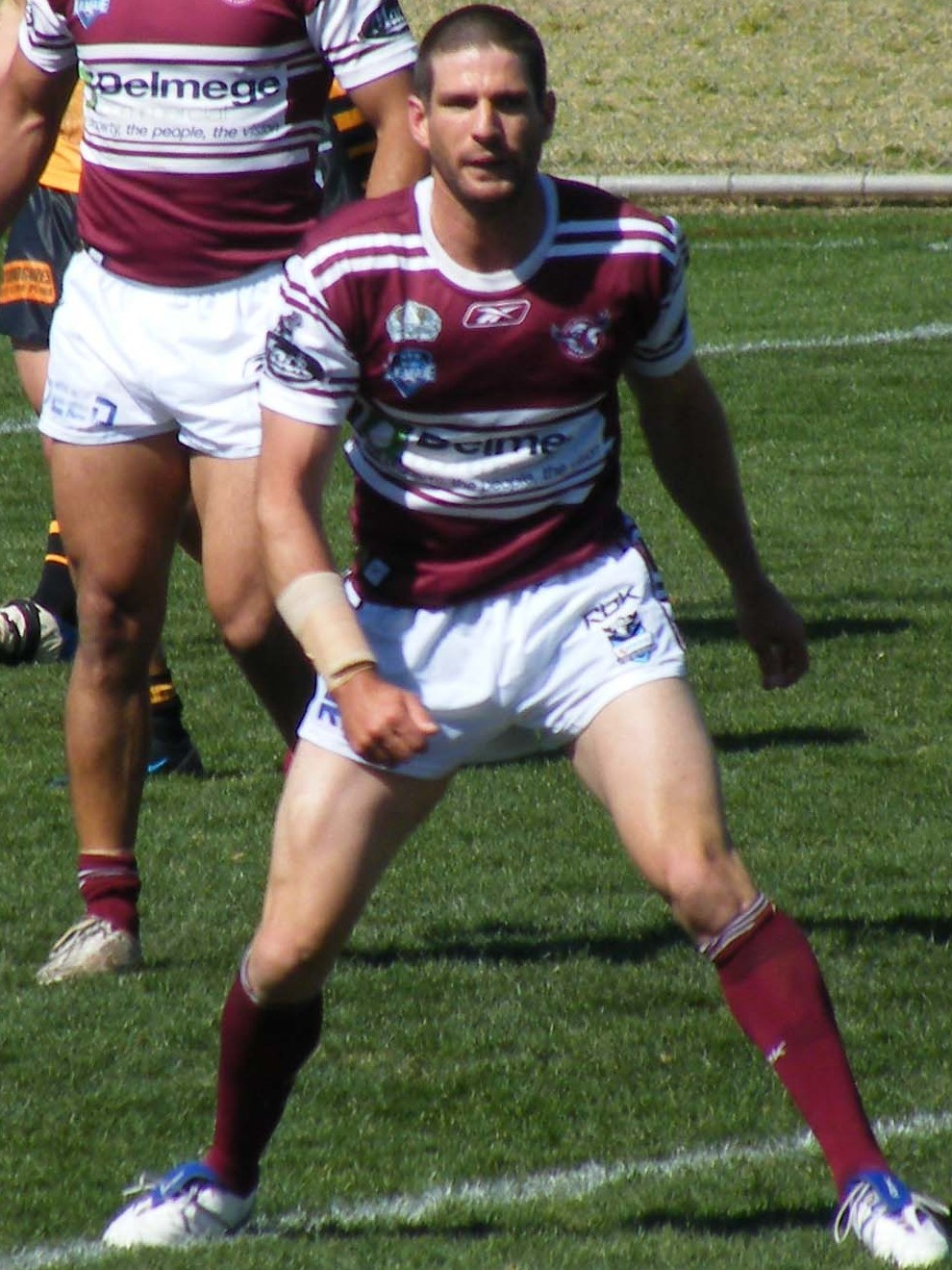

Personal information
- Full name: Clint Halden
- Born: 20 January 1981 (age 45) Barellan, New South Wales, Australia
- Height: 180 cm (5 ft 11 in)
- Weight: 85 kg (13 st 5 lb)

Playing information
- Position: Halfback, Hooker
Club
Years	Team	Pld	T	G	FG	P
2007	Manly Sea Eagles	6	1	0	0	4
- Source: As of 22 January 2019

Clint Halden (born 20 January 1981) is an Australian former professional rugby league footballer who played for the Manly-Warringah Sea Eagles in the National Rugby League competition. He played as a halfback or as a hooker.

== Background ==
Halden was born in Barellan, New South Wales, Australia.

== Playing career ==
Halden made his first grade debut for Manly in round 2 of the 2007 NRL season against the Wests Tigers at Leichhardt Oval. Halden's last game for Manly came in round 24 of the same year against the New Zealand Warriors which ended in a 36–14 loss at Mt Smart Stadium. Halden subsequently never played first grade again.
