= Ron Beaumont =

Australian rugby league footballer

Personal information
- Full name: Ronald Vernon Beaumont
- Born: 9 April 1928 Sydney, New South Wales, Australia
- Died: 13 May 2012 (aged 84)

Playing information
- Position: Fullback
Club
Years	Team	Pld	T	G	FG	P
1947–53	Manly-Warringah	115	3	3	0	15
- Source: As of 26 March 2019

Ron Beaumont (1928−2012) was an Australian professional rugby league footballer who played in the 1940s and 1950s. He played his entire career for Manly-Warringah in the NSWRL competition. Beaumont was a foundation player for Manly and played in the club's first season.

== Background ==
Beaumont was a member of the Manly presidents cup side in 1946 which won the competition defeating North Sydney in the final. This was seen as the catalyst for Manly being granted a licence to have a team in the first grade NSWRL competition.

== Playing career ==
Beaumont made his first grade debut for Manly in 1947 and played 10 games for the club in their inaugural season. Beaumont became a regular starter for Manly over the following seasons as the club narrowly avoided the wooden spoon.

In 1951, Manly finished second on the table and made the finals for the first time in their history. Manly went on to reach the 1951 NSWRL grand final against South Sydney. Beaumont played at fullback as Souths comprehensively beat Manly 42–14 in the final which was played at the Sydney Sports Ground. At the time this was the highest scoring grand final since 1908.

After losing the grand final, Manly slid back down the ladder but Beaumont remained loyal to the club playing with them until the end of the 1953 season before retiring.
