= Damian Browne (rugby league) =

Australian rugby league footballer

Personal information
- Full name: Damian Browne
- Born: 21 February 1975 (age 50); Sydney, New South Wales, Australia

Playing information
- Position: Wing, Second-row
Club
| Years | Team | Pld | T | G | FG | P |
|---|---|---|---|---|---|---|
| 1995–96 | South Sydney | 16 | 2 | 0 | 0 | 8 |
| 1998 | Manly-Warringah | 14 | 0 | 0 | 0 | 0 |
| | Total | 30 | 2 | 0 | 0 | 8 |
- Source: As of 27 January 2023

Damian Browne is an Australian former professional rugby league footballer who played in the 1990s. He played for South Sydney and Manly-Warringah in the ARL/NRL competition.

== Playing career ==
Browne made his first grade debut in round 16 of the 1995 ARL season against the newly admitted North Queensland side. Browne played on the wing in South Sydney's 30-16 wing. The following week, Browne scored two tries in Souths 46-12 loss against St. George. In 1996, Browne made 13 appearances shifting between the wing and second-row positions. In each game Browne featured in that year, South Sydney would lose all 13 games. Browne signed with Manly ahead of the 1998 NRL season playing 14 games before being released at the end of the year.
