= Len Wadling =

Australian rugby league footballer

Personal information
- Full name: Len Wadling

Playing information
- Position: Wing
Club
Years	Team	Pld	T	G	FG	P
1957	Parramatta	3	1	0	0	3
1959–63	Manly Warringah	30	19	0	0	57
	Total	33	20	0	0	60
- Source: As of 3 April 2019

Len Wadling was an Australian professional rugby league footballer who played in 1950s. He played for Manly-Warringah and Parramatta in the New South Wales Rugby League (NSWRL) competition.

== Playing career ==
Wadling made his first grade debut for Parramatta in 1957. Wadling made a three appearances for Parramatta in his only season there as the club finished last claiming the wooden spoon. In 1959, Wadling joined Manly-Warringah.

In the same season, Manly reached their third grand final against St George. Wadling played on the wing in the grand final as St George kept Manly scoreless winning their 4th straight premiership 20–0.

In 1962, Wadling was Manly's top try scorer with 12 tries but the club continued to miss the finals throughout the 1960s. Wadling retired at the end of 1963.
