= Jim Sullivan (Australian rugby league) =

Australian rugby league footballer

Personal information
- Full name: James Sullivan

Playing information
- Position: Five-eighth
Club
Years	Team	Pld	T	G	FG	P
1951–52	Manly-Warringah	23	4	0	0	12
- Source: As of 28 March 2019

Jim Sullivan was an Australian professional rugby league footballer who played in 1950s. He played for Manly-Warringah in the NSWRL competition and was a member of their inaugural grand final team.

== Playing career ==
Sullivan made his first grade debut for Manly-Warringah in 1951. During the same season, Manly finished second on the table and reached their first finals campaign. Manly went on to reach the 1951 NSWRL grand final against South Sydney. Sullivan played at five-eighth as Souths comprehensively beat Manly 42–14 in the final which was played at the Sydney Sports Ground. As of the 2019 season, this is the highest scoring grand final in Australian rugby league history.

Following the grand final defeat, Manly missed the finals in 1952. Sullivan retired from rugby league following the conclusion of this season.
