= Jack Hubbard (rugby league) =

Australian rugby league footballer

Personal information
- Full name: Jack Douglas Hubbard
- Born: 26 January 1924 Sydney, New South Wales, Australia
- Died: 6 June 2020 (aged 96)

Playing information
- Position: Second-row
Club
Years	Team	Pld	T	G	FG	P
1947–56	Manly Warringah	116	31	0	0	93
- Source: As of 28 March 2019

Jack Hubbard (1924−2020) was an Australian professional rugby league footballer who played in the 1940s and 1950s. He played for Manly-Warringah in the NSWRL competition. Hubbard was a foundation player for Manly playing in the club's first season.

== Playing career ==
Hubbard made his first grade debut for Manly-Warringah in 1947. Manly went on to finish second last in their inaugural year avoiding the wooden spoon by 2 competition points. Between 1948 and 1950, Manly struggled towards the bottom of the table narrowly avoiding the wooden spoon on each occasion.

In 1951, Manly finished second on the table and reached their first finals campaign. Manly went on to reach the 1951 NSWRL grand final against South Sydney. Hubbard played at second-row as Souths comprehensively beat Manly 42–14 in the final which was played at the Sydney Sports Ground. At the time this was the highest scoring grand final since 1908.

Hubbard played on with Manly until the end of 1956 and at the time of his retirement was one of the club's longest serving players.
