= 1999 NRL season =

Rugby league competition

1999 National Rugby League
- Duration: March 5 – September 26, 1999
- Teams: 17
- Premiers: Melbourne (1st title)
- Minor premiers: Cronulla-Sutherland (2nd title)
- Matches played: 213
- Points scored: 8857
- Average attendance: 15,368
- Attendance: 3,273,372
- Top points scorer(s): Matt Geyer (242)
- Wooden spoon: Western Suburbs Magpies (17th spoon)
- Dally M Medal: Andrew Johns
- Top try-scorer(s): Nathan Blacklock (24)

The 1999 NRL season was the 92nd season of professional rugby league football in Australia, and the second to be run by the National Rugby League. With the exclusion of the Adelaide Rams and Gold Coast Chargers, and the joint venture of the St. George Dragons and Illawarra Steelers, seventeen teams competed for the NRL Premiership during the 1999 season, which culminated in the first grand final to be played at Stadium Australia. The St. George Illawarra Dragons, the first joint-venture club to appear in the grand final, played against the Melbourne Storm, who won the premiership in only their second season.

== Season summary ==
The 1999 National Rugby League season was historic for many reasons. The St. George Illawarra Dragons played their inaugural game after forming the League's first joint venture, losing 10–20 to the Parramatta Eels. That game was the second of a double header, which was the first event to be held at Sydney's Stadium Australia, the central venue for the Olympic Games the following year. That game attracted a rugby league world record of 104,583 spectators.

During the season, the members of the Balmain Tigers and Western Suburbs Magpies voted to form another joint venture, to be named the Wests Tigers. After the conclusion of the season, the South Sydney Rabbitohs and North Sydney Bears were excluded from the premiership. The Bears would later form the game's third joint venture with the Manly Warringah Sea Eagles to form the Northern Eagles which later collapsed with the licence being revoked to Manly Warringah, whilst South Sydney would fight a successful two-year legal battle for reinclusion.

In August the NRL's CEO Neil Whittaker announced that he would resign at the end of the season.

The defending premiers, Brisbane endured their worst ever start to a season, with just one win and a draw from their first ten games, however they would miraculously recover and record 11 wins in a row before hitting a few hurdles along the way, including a draw against Manly in round 24 and a loss against then-bogey team Parramatta at home in round 25. Their champion halfback and captain Allan Langer retired mid-season as a result. The Newcastle Knights also lost an iconic player when 1997 premiership captain Paul Harragon retired mid-season due to a chronic knee injury. The Melbourne Storm's premiership victory saw their captain Glenn Lazarus become the only player to ever win grand finals for three clubs.

Cliff Lyons, making a comeback from retirement for the Manly-Warringah Sea Eagles, was the oldest player in the NRL in 1999.

=== Teams ===
The exclusion of the Adelaide Rams and Gold Coast Chargers, and the joint venture of the St. George Dragons and Illawarra Steelers, saw a reduction in the League's teams from twenty to seventeen: the largest reduction in the number of teams in premiership history and the first reduction since the exclusion of Sydney's Newtown Jets at the end of the 1983 season.

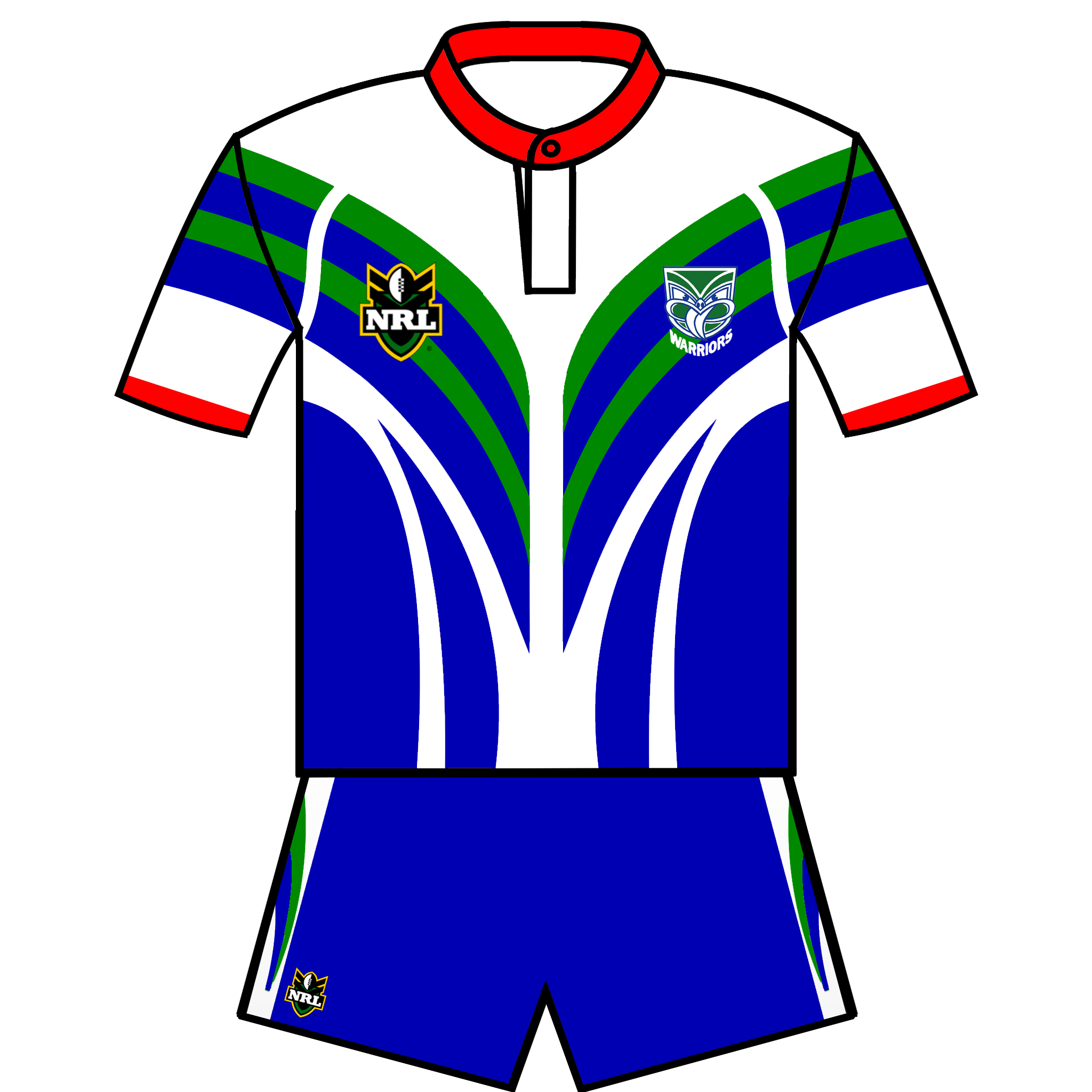
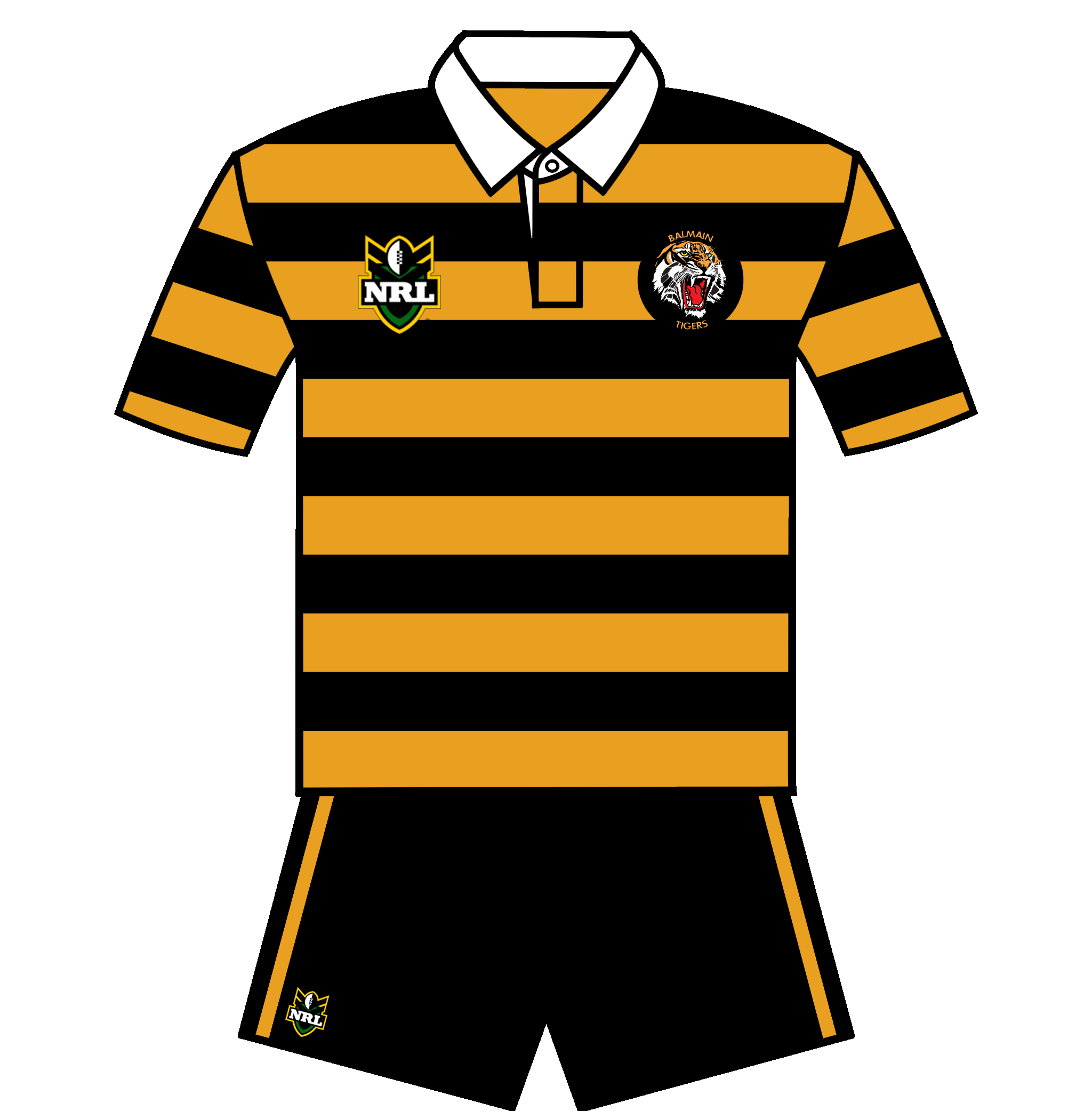
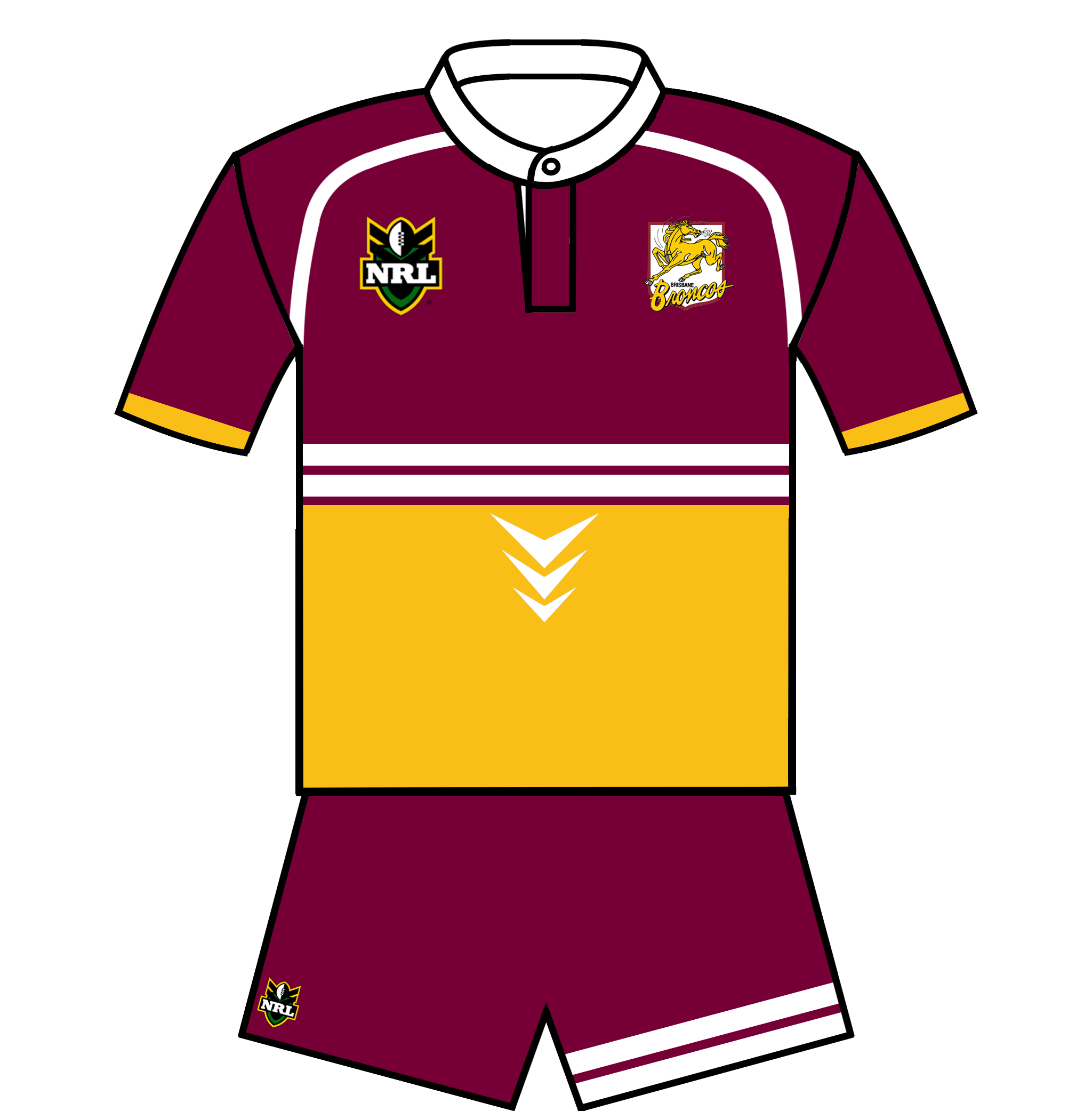
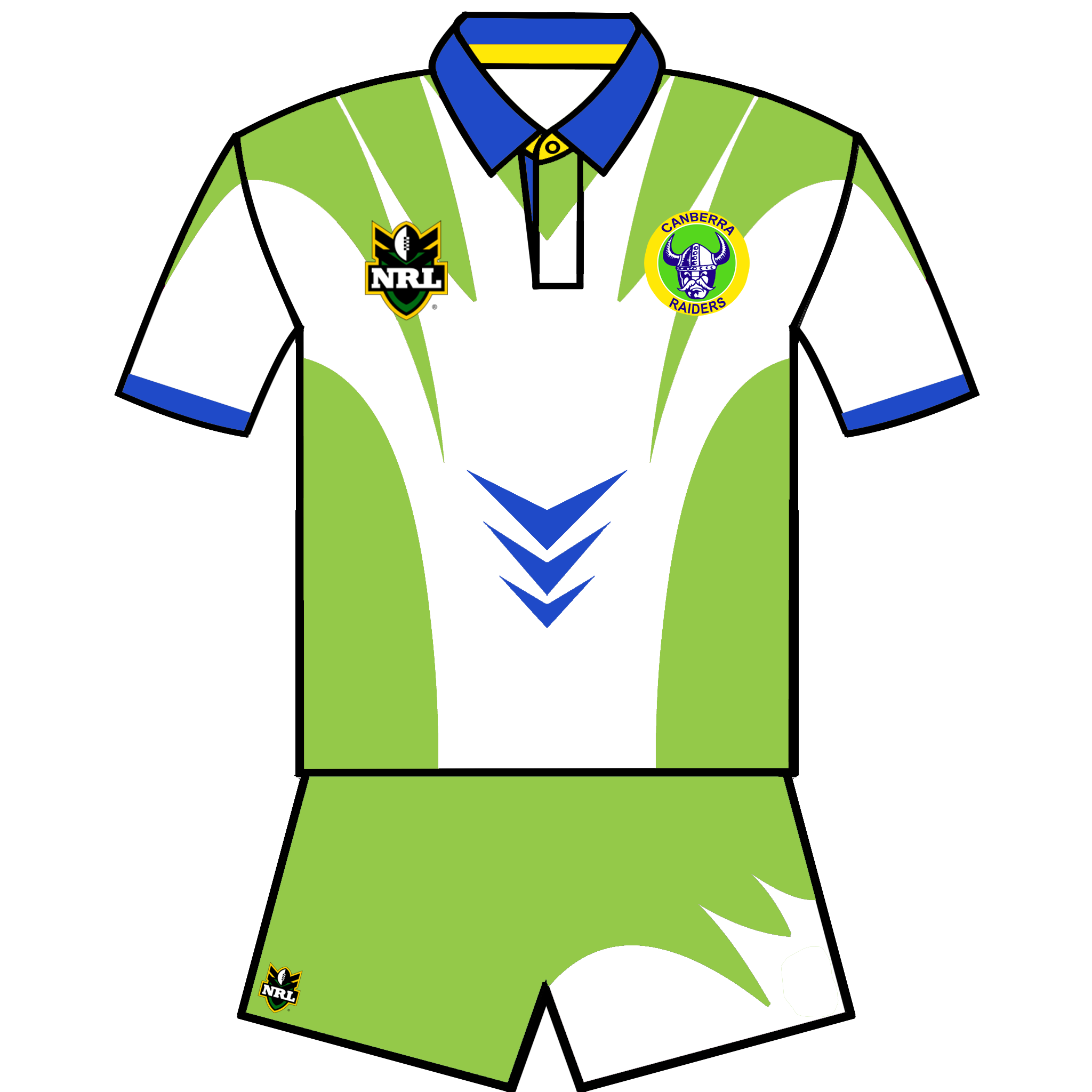
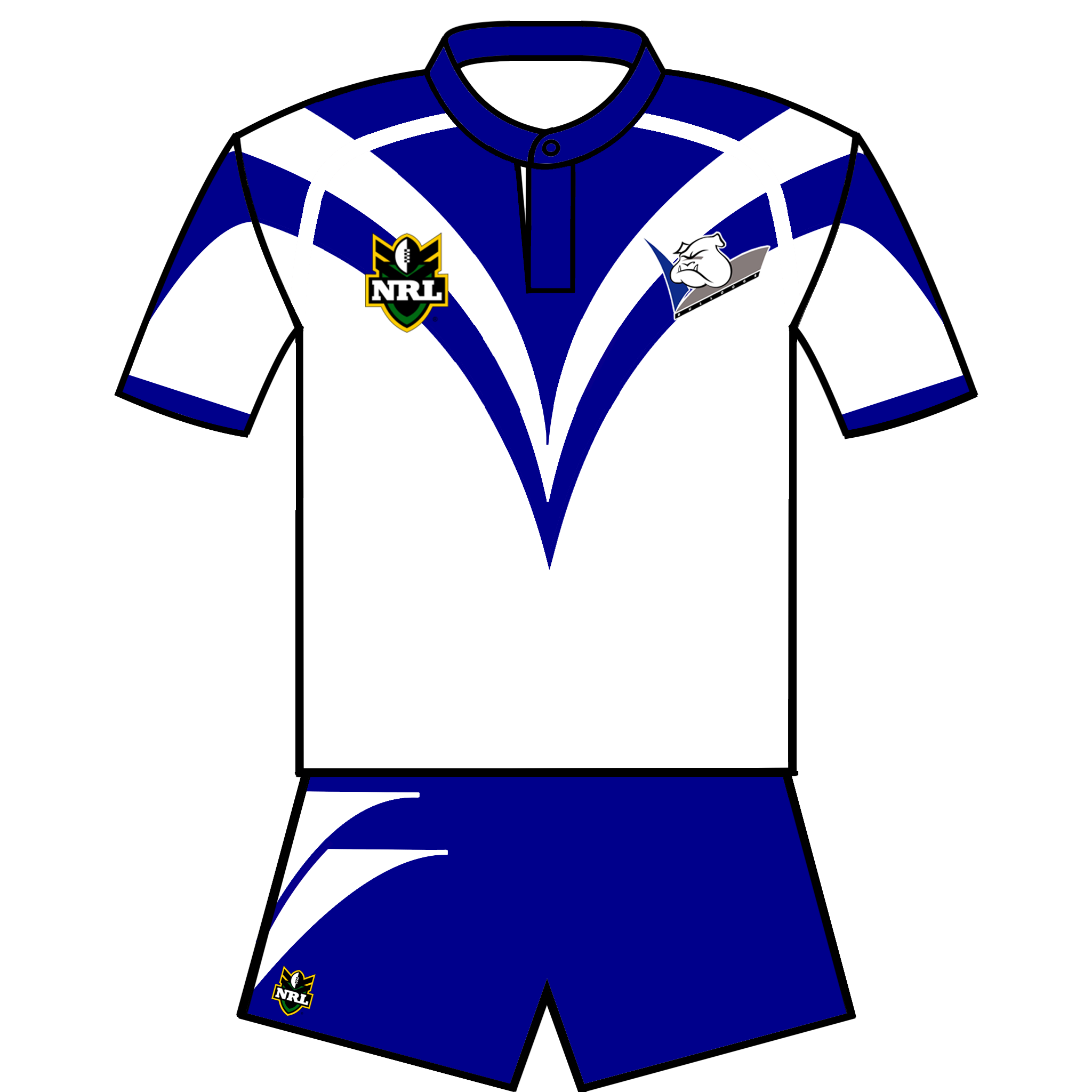
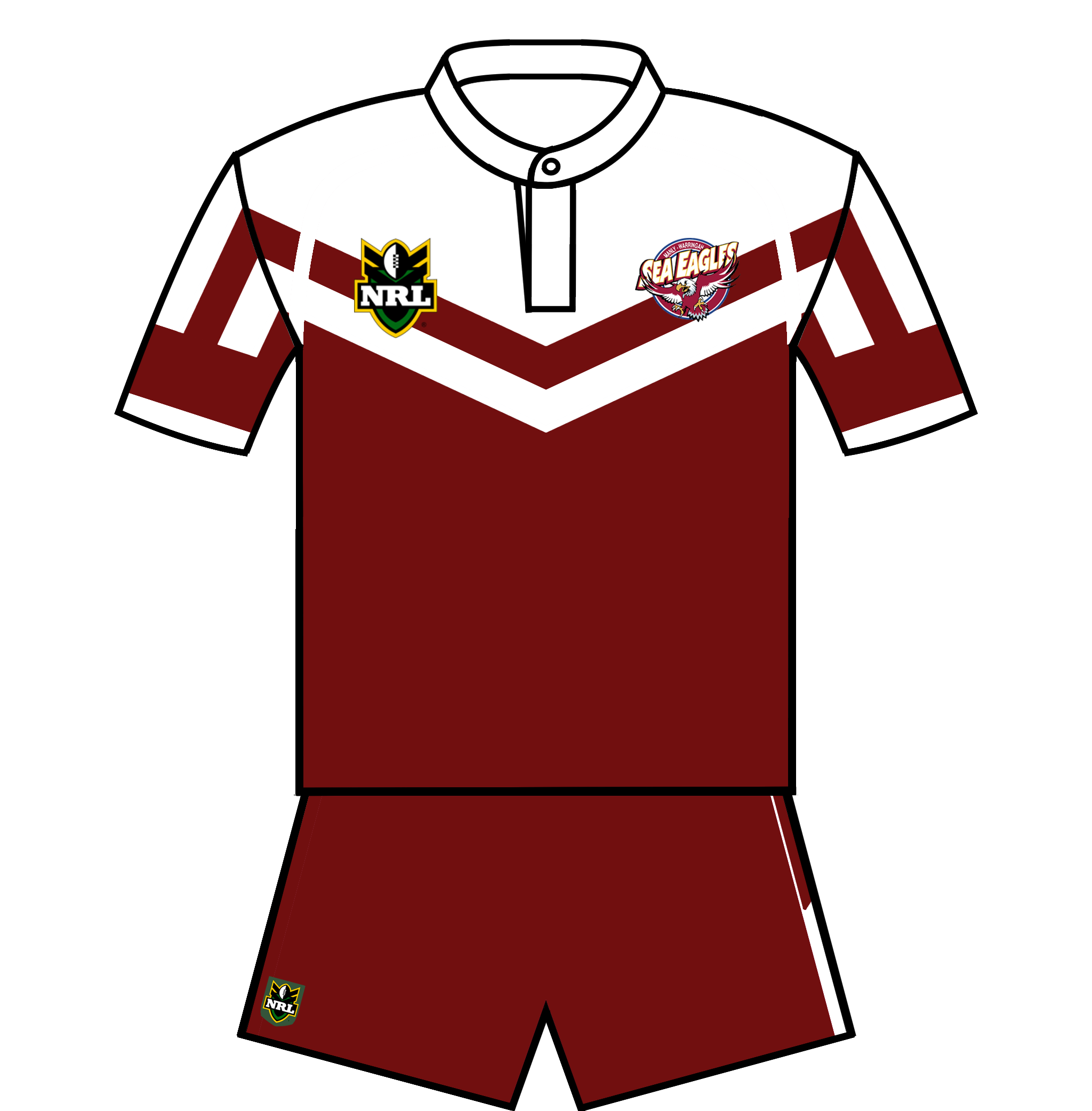
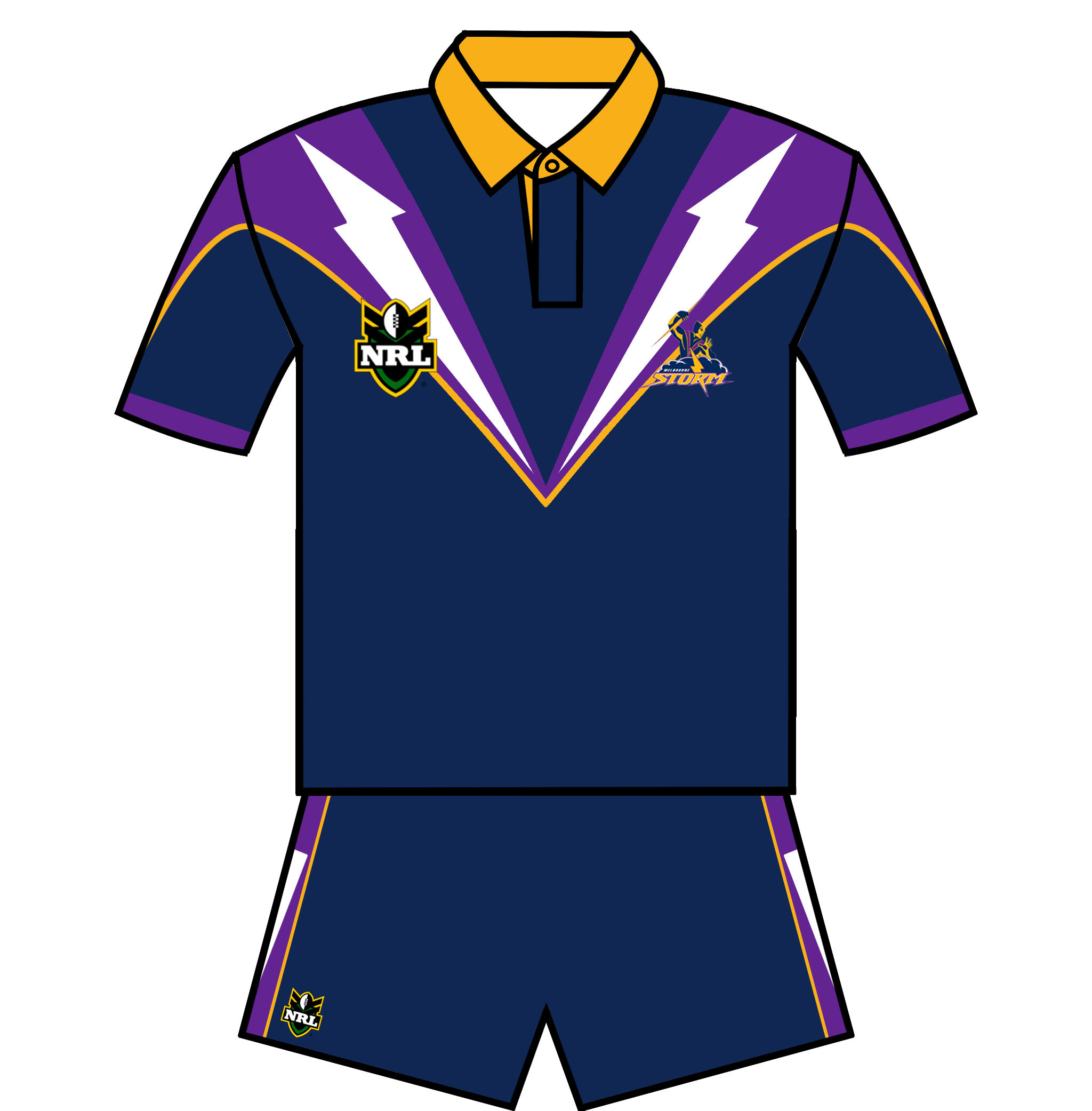
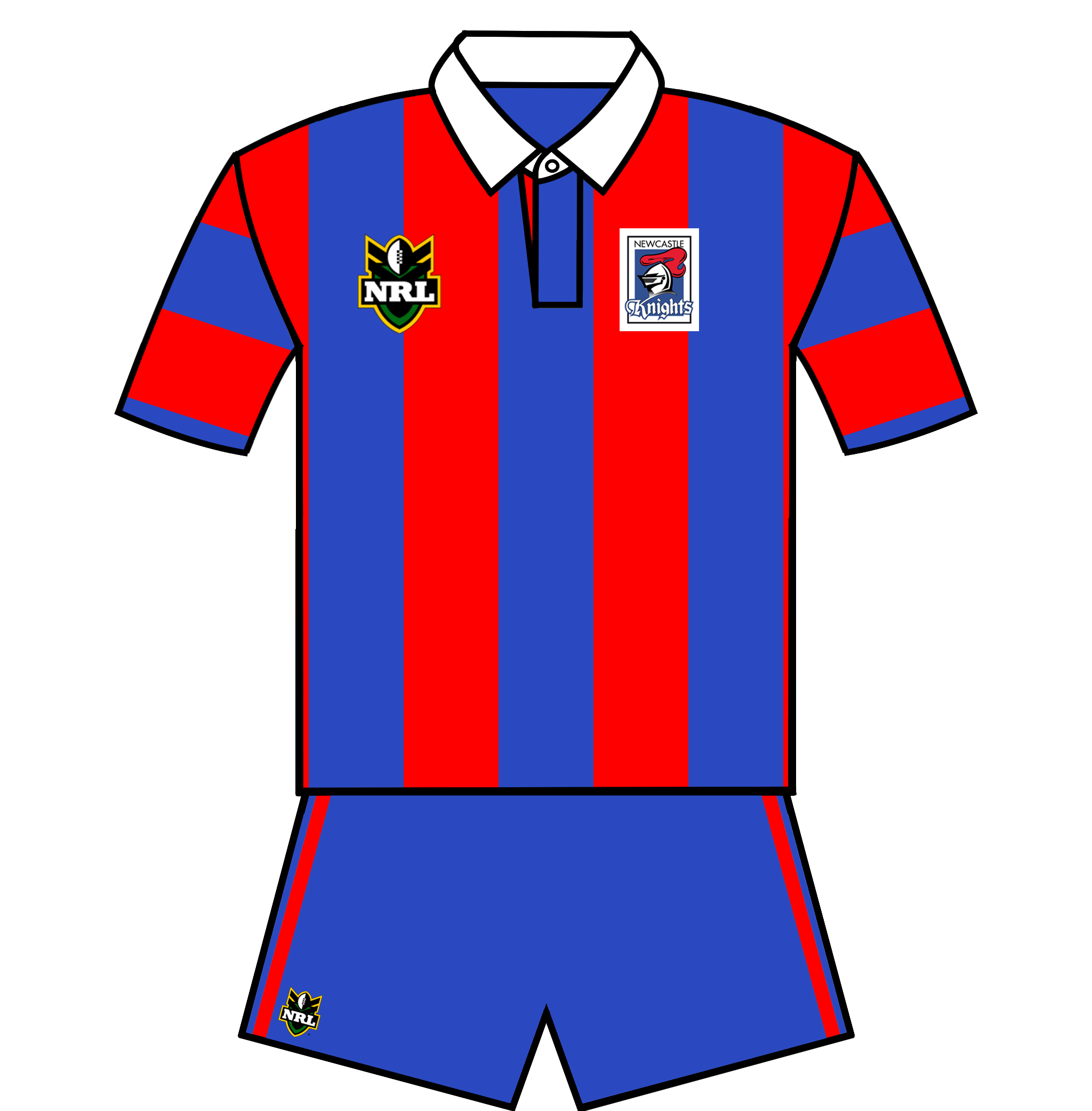
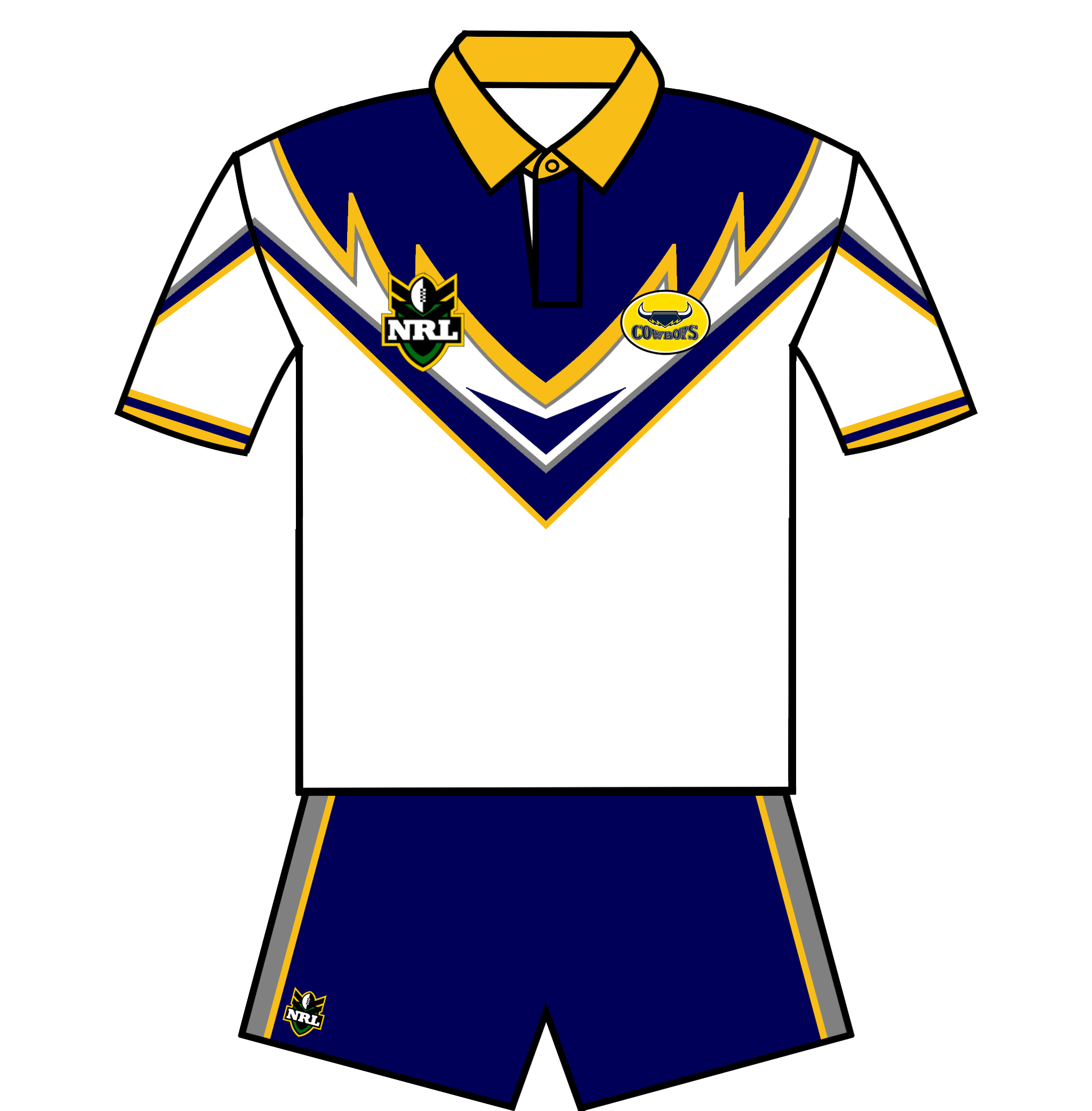
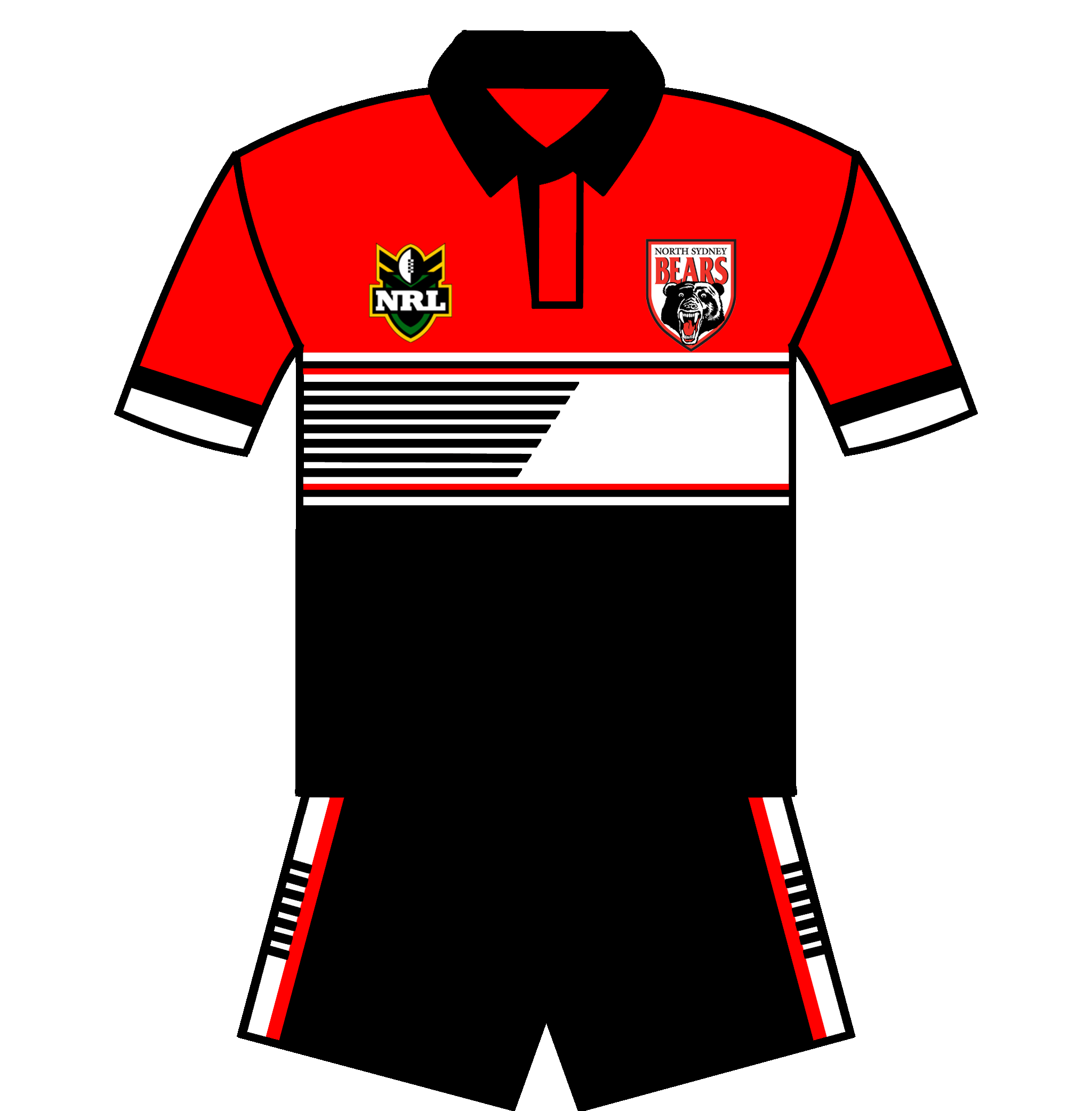
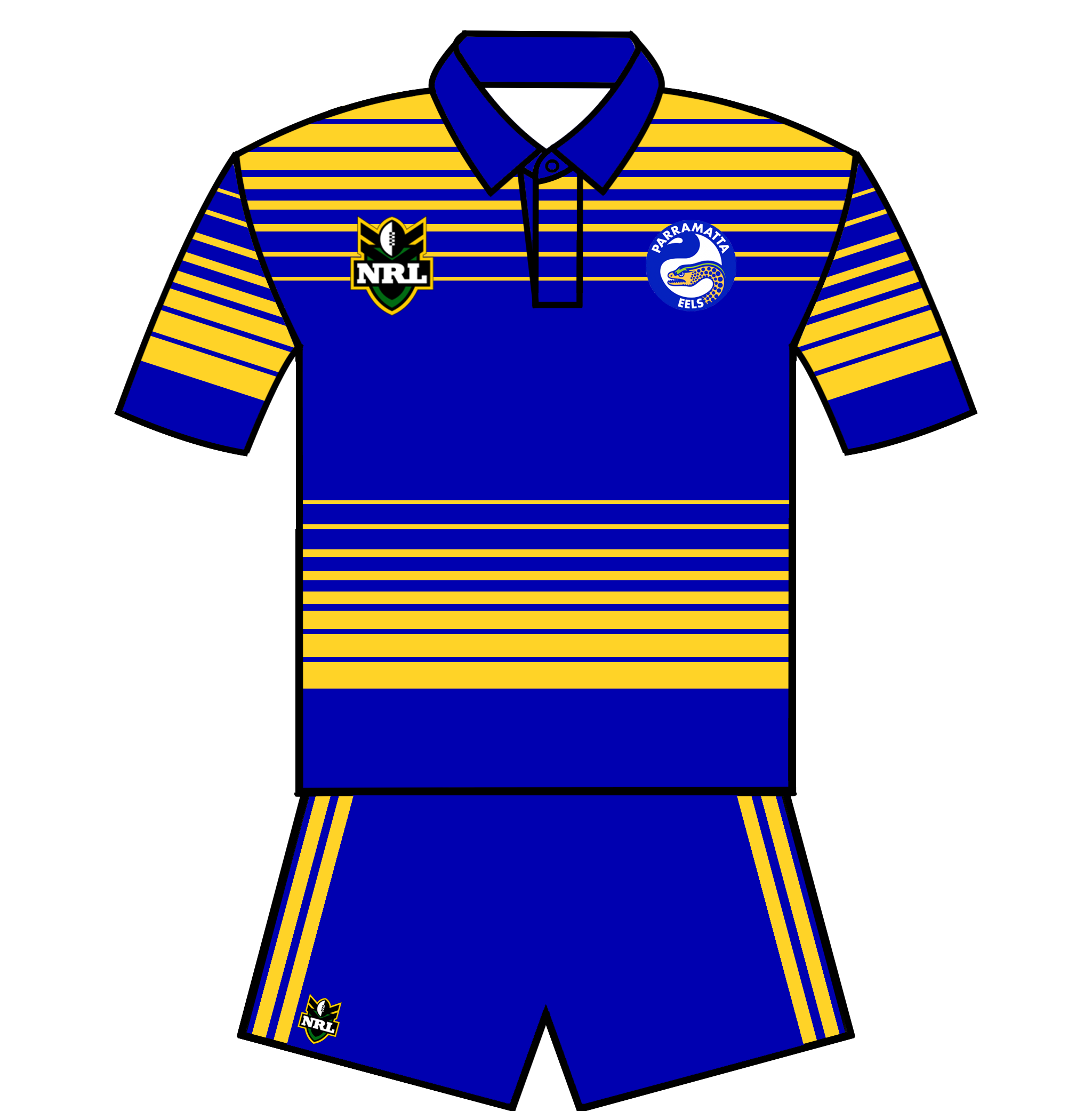
Auckland; Warriors 5th season Ground: Ericsson Stadium; Coach: Mark Graham; Captain: Matthew Ridge → John Simon	Balmain; Tigers 92nd season Ground: Leichhardt Oval; Coach: Wayne Pearce; Captain: Darren Senter	Brisbane; Broncos 12th season Ground: ANZ Stadium; Coach: Wayne Bennett; Captain: Allan Langer → Kevin Walters	Canberra; Raiders 18th season Ground: Bruce Stadium; Coach: Mal Meninga; Captain: Laurie Daley	Canterbury; Bulldogs 65th season Ground: Stadium Australia; Coach: Steve Folkes; Captain: Darren Britt
Manly-Warringah; Sea Eagles 53rd season Ground: Brookvale Oval; Coach: Peter Sharp; Captain: Geoff Toovey	Melbourne; Storm 2nd season Ground: Olympic Park Stadium; Coach: Chris Anderson; Captain: Glenn Lazarus	Newcastle; Knights 12th season Ground: Marathon Stadium; Coach: Warren Ryan; Captain: Paul Harragon → Tony Butterfield	North Queensland; Cowboys 5th season Ground: Malanda Stadium; Coach: Tim Sheens; Captain: Noel Goldthorpe	North Sydney; Bears 92nd season Ground: North Sydney Oval; Coach: Peter Louis → Kieran Dempsey; Captain: Jason Taylor
Parramatta; Eels 53rd season Ground: Parramatta Stadium; Coach: Brian Smith; Captain: Jarrod McCracken & Nathan Cayless	Penrith; Panthers; 33rd season Ground: Penrith Stadium; Coach: Royce Simmons; Captain: Steve Carter	Sharks; 33rd season Ground: Shark Park; Coach: John Lang; Captain: Andrew Ettingshausen	South Sydney; Rabbitohs; 92nd season Ground: Sydney Football Stadium; Coach: Craig Coleman; Captain: Sean Garlick	St. George-Illawarra; Dragons; 1st season Ground: Kogarah Oval & WIN Stadium; Coach: David Waite & Andrew Farrar; Captain: Paul McGregor
Sydney City; Roosters; 92nd season Ground: Sydney Football Stadium; Coach: Phil Gould; Captain: Brad Fittler	Western Suburbs; Magpies; 92nd season Ground: Campbelltown Stadium; Coach: Tommy Raudonikis; Captain: Steve Georgallis

=== Advertising ===
In a move that polarised some fans, the NRL in its 1999 promotional campaign focused on the game's grass roots supporters who perhaps had been overlooked and pained in the trauma of the Super League war. Sydney advertising agency VCD, in the third year of their four-year tenure with the NRL, produced an advertisement featuring Thomas Keneally reading his poem, "Ode to Rugby League", which had been commissioned by the NRL. It speaks of the innocent excitement that begins each season. The ad was used at season launch and there was minimal media budget to support it throughout the year. Keneally is a longtime supporter of the Manly-Warringah Sea Eagles.

We go to the cupboard, we take out club colours.

And the air sings. The season's close.
Our boys are running up sandhills, their legs pump.
This season, this season, this is our season.
This year we all start equal.
Kids paint signs, and I am seven again.
I know I will see heroes soon.
I feel the excitement.
I have hope in March, and I might share in the glory of September.
Blow that whistle, ref.
Send that ball soaring.

Blow that whistle, ref.

— Thomas Keneally

=== Ladder ===
1999 NRL season
Pos	Team	Pld	W	D	L	B	PF	PA	PD	Pts
1	Cronulla-Sutherland Sharks	24	18	0	6	2	586	332	+254	40
2	Parramatta Eels	24	17	0	7	2	500	294	+206	38
3	Melbourne Storm (P)	24	16	0	8	2	639	392	+247	36
4	Sydney City Roosters	24	16	0	8	2	592	377	+215	36
5	Canterbury-Bankstown Bulldogs	24	15	1	8	2	520	462	+58	35
6	St. George Illawarra Dragons	24	15	0	9	2	588	416	+172	34
7	Newcastle Knights	24	14	1	9	2	575	484	+91	33
8	Brisbane Broncos	24	13	2	9	2	510	368	+142	32
9	Canberra Raiders	24	13	1	10	2	618	439	+179	31
10	Penrith Panthers	24	11	1	12	2	492	428	+64	27
11	Auckland Warriors	24	10	0	14	2	538	498	+40	24
12	South Sydney Rabbitohs	24	10	0	14	2	349	556	-207	24
13	Manly Warringah Sea Eagles	24	9	1	14	2	454	623	-169	23
14	North Sydney Bears	24	8	0	16	2	490	642	-152	20
15	Balmain Tigers	24	8	0	16	2	345	636	-291	20
16	North Queensland Cowboys	24	4	1	19	2	398	588	-190	13
17	Western Suburbs Magpies	24	3	0	21	2	285	944	-659	10

=== Ladder progression ===
- Numbers highlighted in green indicate that the team finished the round inside the top 8.
- Numbers highlighted in blue indicates the team finished first on the ladder in that round.
- Numbers highlighted in red indicates the team finished in last place on the ladder in that round
- Numbers underlined indicate the team had a bye in that round

	Team	1	2	3	4	5	6	7	8	9	10	11	12	13	14	15	16	17	18	19	20	21	22	23	24	25	26
1	Cronulla-Sutherland	2	4	6	8	10	12	12	14	16	18	20	22	22	24	24	26	26	26	28	30	30	32	34	36	38	40
2	Parramatta	2	4	4	6	6	6	8	8	10	12	14	14	16	18	18	20	22	24	26	28	30	32	34	34	36	38
3	Melbourne	2	2	4	6	6	8	8	10	12	14	16	18	18	18	18	20	22	22	24	26	28	30	32	34	34	36
4	Sydney City	0	2	4	6	8	10	12	14	14	16	18	20	22	22	24	24	24	26	28	30	30	32	32	34	34	36
5	Canterbury	0	2	4	4	6	6	8	10	10	12	14	16	18	20	22	22	22	24	24	26	28	30	32	33	35	35
6	St George Illawarra	0	0	2	2	4	6	8	8	10	10	10	12	14	16	18	20	22	24	26	28	28	30	30	30	32	34
7	Newcastle	2	2	2	4	6	6	8	9	9	11	13	13	15	17	19	21	23	25	27	29	29	29	31	33	33	33
8	Brisbane	0	0	0	0	0	2	2	3	3	3	5	7	9	11	13	15	17	19	21	23	25	27	29	30	30	32
9	Canberra	2	2	2	4	6	8	8	9	11	11	11	13	13	15	17	17	19	21	21	21	23	25	27	29	29	31
10	Penrith	0	2	4	6	8	10	12	14	14	16	16	16	18	18	20	20	20	20	20	20	22	24	24	25	27	27
11	Auckland	2	2	4	4	4	4	4	6	6	6	8	8	8	10	10	12	14	14	14	14	16	16	18	20	22	24
12	South Sydney	2	4	4	6	8	8	8	8	10	10	12	14	16	16	18	18	20	22	24	24	24	24	24	24	24	24
13	Manly-Warringah	0	0	0	0	0	0	0	2	4	6	6	8	8	10	10	10	10	12	14	16	18	18	20	21	23	23
14	North Sydney	2	4	6	8	8	10	10	10	10	10	10	10	12	14	14	16	16	16	16	16	16	16	16	16	18	20
15	Balmain	0	2	4	4	6	6	8	10	10	12	12	12	12	12	14	16	16	16	16	16	18	18	18	20	20	20
16	North Queensland	2	2	2	2	2	2	4	5	7	7	7	9	9	9	9	9	11	11	11	11	11	11	11	11	13	13
17	Western Suburbs	0	2	2	2	2	4	6	6	6	6	6	8	8	10	10	10	10	10	10	10	10	10	10	10	10	10

== Finals series ==
Home	Score	Away	Match Information
Home	Score	Away	Date and Time (local)	Venue	Referee	Crowd
Qualifying Finals
Sydney City Roosters	8–12	Canterbury-Bankstown Bulldogs	3 September 1999, 7:30 pm	Sydney Football Stadium	Sean Hampstead	23,478
Melbourne Storm	10–34	St. George Illawarra Dragons	4 September 1999, 2:30 pm	Olympic Park	Steve Clark	22,053
Parramatta Eels	30–16	Newcastle Knights	4 September 1999, 7:30 pm	Parramatta Stadium	Bill Harrigan	15,653
Cronulla-Sutherland Sharks	42–20	Brisbane Broncos	5 September 1999, 2:30 pm	Shark Park	Tim Mander	13,713
Semi-finals
St. George Illawarra Dragons	28–18	Sydney City Roosters	11 September 1999, 7:30 pm	Sydney Football Stadium	Bill Harrigan	31,506
Canterbury-Bankstown Bulldogs	22–24	Melbourne Storm	12 September 1999, 2:30 pm	Sydney Football Stadium	Steve Clark	20,075
Preliminary Finals
Parramatta Eels	16-18	Melbourne Storm	18 September 1999, 7:30 pm	Sydney Football Stadium	Bill Harrigan	27,555
Cronulla-Sutherland Sharks	8–24	St. George Illawarra Dragons	19 September 1999, 2:30 pm	Stadium Australia	Steve Clark	51,827
Grand Final
St. George Illawarra Dragons	18-20	Melbourne Storm	26 September 1999, 3:00 pm	Stadium Australia	Bill Harrigan	107,999

=== Chart ===
Qualifying finals
1	Cronulla	42
8	Brisbane	20
2	Parramatta	30
7	Newcastle	16
3	Melbourne	10
6	St. George Illawarra	34
4	Sydney City	8
5	Canterbury	12

Semifinals
4W	St. George Illawarra	28
2L	Sydney City	18
3W	Canterbury	22
1L	Melbourne	24

Preliminary finals
1W	Cronulla	8
St. George Illawarra	24
2W	Parramatta	16
Melbourne	18

Final
St. George Illawarra	18
Melbourne	20

=== Grand Final ===
The 1999 NRL Grand Final was the conclusive and premiership-deciding game of the 1999 NRL season. It was contested by the competition's two newest clubs: the Melbourne Storm, competing in only its second year (having finished the regular season in 3rd place); and the St. George Illawarra Dragons, in their first year as a joint-venture club (having finished the regular season in 6th place), after both sides eliminated the rest of the top eight during the finals.

A new rugby league world record crowd of 107,999 was at Stadium Australia for the game. The attendance, which saw 67,142 more people attend than had done so for the 1998 NRL Grand Final at the Sydney Football Stadium, broke the record attendance for a Grand Final, eclipsing the previous record of 78,065 set in 1965 when St. George defeated South Sydney 12–8 at the Sydney Cricket Ground. It was the last time that the Clive Churchill Medal was presented in a case before it was changed the following season where it is presented separately with a ribbon being worn around the neck.

Pre-match entertainment featured Hugh Jackman's rendition of the Australian national anthem.

1999 NRL Grand Final

Sunday, 26 September
15:00 AEST (UTC+10)

Melbourne Storm	20–18	St. George-Illawarra Dragons
Tries: 3 Martin 53'; Roarty 57'; Smith (penalty) 75'; Goals: 4 Smith pen 42', 59', pen 64' (3/4); Geyer 77' (1/1)	1st: 0–14; 2nd: 20–4; Report	Tries: 3 Fitzgibbon 13'; Blacklock 29'; McGregor 56'; Goals: 3 Bartrim 15', 31' (2/3); Fitzgibbon pen 23' (1/1)

Stadium Australia, Sydney
Attendance: 107,999
Referee: Bill Harrigan
Touch judges: Colin White, John McCormack
Clive Churchill Medal: Brett Kimmorley (Melbourne)

== Player statistics ==
The following statistics are as of the conclusion of Round 24.

Top 5 point scorers

Points	Player	Tries	Goals	Field Goals
230	Matt Geyer	18	79	0
229	Ryan Girdler	18	77	3
200	Daryl Halligan	7	86	0
180	Andrew Johns	7	74	4
174	Luke Williamson	6	74	2

Top 5 try scorers

Tries	Player
20	Nathan Blacklock
19	Robbie Ross
18	Matt Geyer
18	Ryan Girdler
17	David Peachey
17	Brett Howland
17	Rod Silva

Top 5 goal scorers

Goals	Player
86	Daryl Halligan
79	Matt Geyer
77	Ryan Girdler
74	Andrew Johns
74	Luke Williamson

== 1999 Transfers ==
=== Players ===
Player	1998 Club	1999 Club
Graham Appo	Adelaide Rams	Sydney City Roosters
Dave Boughton	Adelaide Rams	Super League: Huddersfield Giants
Alan Cann	Adelaide Rams	Retirement
Peter Clarke	Adelaide Rams	South Sydney Rabbitohs
Mark Corvo	Adelaide Rams	Canberra Raiders
Matt Daylight	Adelaide Rams	Super League: Gateshead Thunder
Darrien Doherty	Adelaide Rams	North Queensland Cowboys
Brett Galea	Adelaide Rams	Retirement
Noel Goldthorpe	Adelaide Rams	North Queensland Cowboys
Andrew Hick	Adelaide Rams	Super League: Gateshead Thunder
Tony Iro	Adelaide Rams	South Sydney Rabbitohs
Bruce Mamando	Adelaide Rams	N/A
Rod Maybon	Adelaide Rams	Canberra Raiders
Marty McKenzie	Adelaide Rams	Retirement
Andrew Pierce	Adelaide Rams	Cronulla-Sutherland Sharks
Chris Quinn	Adelaide Rams	Parramatta Eels
Dean Schifilliti	Adelaide Rams	Parramatta Eels
Wayne Simonds	Adelaide Rams	Featherstone Rovers
Kerrod Walters	Adelaide Rams	Super League: Gateshead Thunder
Luke Williamson	Adelaide Rams	Canberra Raiders
Sean Hoppe	Auckland Warriors	Super League: St. Helens
Kevin Iro	Auckland Warriors	Super League: St. Helens
Stephen Kearney	Auckland Warriors	Melbourne Storm
Quentin Pongia	Auckland Warriors	Sydney City Roosters
Tea Ropati	Auckland Warriors	Retirement
Tyran Smith	Auckland Warriors	Balmain Tigers
Anthony Swann	Auckland Warriors	North Sydney Bears
Paul Sironen	Balmain Tigers	Villeneuve Leopards (French Rugby League Championship)
Michael Withers	Balmain Tigers	Super League: Bradford Bulls
Darren Smith	Brisbane Broncos	Canterbury-Bankstown Bulldogs
Bradley Clyde	Canberra Raiders	Canterbury-Bankstown Bulldogs
Brett Hetherington	Canberra Raiders	North Queensland Cowboys
Luke Priddis	Canberra Raiders	Brisbane Broncos
Ricky Stuart	Canberra Raiders	Canterbury-Bankstown Bulldogs
Greg Fleming	Canterbury-Bankstown Bulldogs	Super League: London Broncos
Tony Grimaldi	Canterbury-Bankstown Bulldogs	Super League: Gateshead Thunder
Solomon Haumono	Canterbury-Bankstown Bulldogs	Balmain Tigers
Robert Mears	Canterbury-Bankstown Bulldogs	Auckland Warriors
Paul Mellor	Canterbury-Bankstown Bulldogs	Cronulla-Sutherland Sharks
Mitch Newton	Canterbury-Bankstown Bulldogs	Retirement
Matthew Ryan	Canterbury-Bankstown Bulldogs	North Queensland Cowboys
Robert Tocco	Canterbury-Bankstown Bulldogs	South Sydney Rabbitohs
Scott Wilson	Canterbury-Bankstown Bulldogs	Super League: Warrington Wolves
Geoff Bell	Cronulla-Sutherland Sharks	North Queensland Cowboys
Les Davidson	Cronulla-Sutherland Sharks	Retirement
Paul Green	Cronulla-Sutherland Sharks	North Queensland Cowboys
Craig Greenhill	Cronulla-Sutherland Sharks	Penrith Panthers
Danny Lee	Cronulla-Sutherland Sharks	Super League: Gateshead Thunder
Nick Zisti	Cronulla-Sutherland Sharks	Super League: Bradford Bulls
Troy Campbell	Gold Coast Chargers	Retirement
Scott Conley	Gold Coast Chargers	Newcastle Knights
Damian Driscoll	Gold Coast Chargers	Manly-Warringah Sea Eagles
Tony Durheim	Gold Coast Chargers	Retirement
Jamie Goddard	Gold Coast Chargers	North Sydney Bears
Jason Hudson	Gold Coast Chargers	Retirement
Andrew King	Gold Coast Chargers	Manly-Warringah Sea Eagles
Chris Lawler	Gold Coast Chargers	Retirement
Graham Mackay	Gold Coast Chargers	Manly-Warringah Sea Eagles
Jason Nicol	Gold Coast Chargers	South Sydney Rabbitohs
Clinton O'Brien	Gold Coast Chargers	Newcastle Knights
Steve Parsons	Gold Coast Chargers	North Sydney Bears
Wes Patten	Gold Coast Chargers	South Sydney Rabbitohs
Scott Sattler	Gold Coast Chargers	Penrith Panthers
Craig Teevan	Gold Coast Chargers	Retirement
Trent Barrett	Illawarra Steelers	St. George Illawarra Dragons
Darren Bradstreet	Illawarra Steelers	Super League: London Broncos
Jonathan Britten	Illawarra Steelers	Retirement
Dean Callaway	Illawarra Steelers	Super League: London Broncos
Scott Cram	Illawarra Steelers	Super League: London Broncos
Craig Fitzgibbon	Illawarra Steelers	St. George Illawarra Dragons
Andrew Hart	Illawarra Steelers	St. George Illawarra Dragons
Terry Lamey	Illawarra Steelers	St. George Illawarra Dragons
Chris Leikvoll	Illawarra Steelers	St. George Illawarra Dragons
Brad Mackay	Illawarra Steelers	St. George Illawarra Dragons
Paul McGregor	Illawarra Steelers	St. George Illawarra Dragons
Andrew Purcell	Illawarra Steelers	Super League: Hull Sharks
Brendon Reeves	Illawarra Steelers	Manly-Warringah Sea Eagles
Will Robinson	Illawarra Steelers	Super League: Gateshead Thunder
Craig Simon	Illawarra Steelers	Super League: Gateshead Thunder
Craig Smith	Illawarra Steelers	St. George Illawarra Dragons
Shaun Timmins	Illawarra Steelers	St. George Illawarra Dragons
David Walsh	Illawarra Steelers	Retirement
Craig Wilson	Illawarra Steelers	Super League: Gateshead Thunder
Rod Wishart	Illawarra Steelers	St. George Illawarra Dragons
Craig Hancock	Manly-Warringah Sea Eagles	Balmain Tigers
John Carlaw	Melbourne Storm	Balmain Tigers
Brett Grogan	Newcastle Knights	Super League: Gateshead Thunder
Lee Jackson	Newcastle Knights	Super League: Leeds Rhinos
Neil Piccinelli	Newcastle Knights	Retirement
Wayne Richards	Newcastle Knights	South Sydney Rabbitohs
Owen Cunningham	North Queensland Cowboys	Manly-Warringah Sea Eagles
Jason Death	North Queensland Cowboys	Auckland Warriors
Andrew Dunemann	North Queensland Cowboys	South Sydney Rabbitohs
Jason Ferris	North Queensland Cowboys	Cronulla-Sutherland Sharks
Dale Fritz	North Queensland Cowboys	Super League: Castleford Tigers
Ian Roberts	North Queensland Cowboys	Retirement
Dale Shearer	North Queensland Cowboys	Retirement
Steve Walters	North Queensland Cowboys	Newcastle Knights
Greg Florimo	North Sydney Bears	Super League: Wigan Warriors
Paul Carige	Parramatta Eels	Super League: Salford City Reds
Ian Herron	Parramatta Eels	Super League: Gateshead Thunder
Brett Horsnell	Parramatta Eels	Retirement
Aaron Raper	Parramatta Eels	Super League: Castleford Tigers
John Simon	Parramatta Eels	Auckland Warriors
Matthew Spence	Parramatta Eels	Western Suburbs Magpies
Phil Adamson	Penrith Panthers	Manly-Warringah Sea Eagles
Brett Boyd	Penrith Panthers	North Queensland Cowboys
Darren Brown	Penrith Panthers	Super League: Salford City Reds
Jody Gall	Penrith Panthers	North Queensland Cowboys
Jason Williams	Penrith Panthers	Retirement
Darren Burns	South Sydney Rabbitohs	Sydney City Roosters
David Hall	South Sydney Rabbitohs	Retirement
Terry Hermansson	South Sydney Rabbitohs	Auckland Warriors
Matt Munro	South Sydney Rabbitohs	Retirement
Michael Ostini	South Sydney Rabbitohs	Balmain Tigers
Geordi Peats	South Sydney Rabbitohs	Retirement
Troy Slattery	South Sydney Rabbitohs	Super League: Huddersfield Giants
Jamie Ainscough	St. George Dragons	St. George Illawarra Dragons
Wayne Bartrim	St. George Dragons	St. George Illawarra Dragons
Nathan Blacklock	St. George Dragons	St. George Illawarra Dragons
Nathan Brown	St. George Dragons	St. George Illawarra Dragons
Adrian Brunker	St. George Dragons	Super League: Wakefield Trinity Wildcats
Mark Coyne	St. George Dragons	St. George Illawarra Dragons
Luke Felsch	St. George Dragons	Super League: Gateshead Thunder
Jeff Hardy	St. George Dragons	Super League: Sheffield Eagles
Tony Hearn	St. George Dragons	Retirement
Jim Lenihan	St. George Dragons	Super League: Huddersfield Giants
Anthony Mundine	St. George Dragons	St. George Illawarra Dragons
Lee Murphy	St. George Dragons	St. George Illawarra Dragons
Corey Pearson	St. George Dragons	St. George Illawarra Dragons
Willie Poching	St. George Dragons	Super League: Wakefield Trinity Wildcats
Matthew Rodwell	St. George Dragons	St. George Illawarra Dragons
Brad Smith	St. George Dragons	Balmain Tigers
Andrew Tangata-Toa	St. George Dragons	Super League: Huddersfield Giants
Lance Thompson	St. George Dragons	St. George Illawarra Dragons
Darren Treacy	St. George Dragons	St. George Illawarra Dragons
Daniel Wagon	St. George Dragons	Parramatta Eels
Colin Ward	St. George Dragons	St. George Illawarra Dragons
Nigel Gaffey	Sydney City Roosters	Penrith Panthers
Scott Gourley	Sydney City Roosters	Retirement
Jason Lowrie	Sydney City Roosters	Balmain Tigers
Damian Kennedy	Western Suburbs Magpies	Canberra Raiders
Aseri Laing	Western Suburbs Magpies	Melbourne Storm
Paul Langmack	Western Suburbs Magpies	Sydney City Roosters
Darren Willis	Western Suburbs Magpies	Retirement
Mark Carroll	Super League: London Broncos	South Sydney Rabbitohs
Luke Goodwin	Super League: London Broncos	Western Suburbs Magpies
Damien Smith	Super League: St. Helens	North Queensland Cowboys
Matt Fuller	Wakefield Trinity	Western Suburbs Magpies

=== Coaches ===
Coach	1998 Club	1999 Club
Mal Reilly	Newcastle Knights	Super League: Huddersfield Giants
