= 1999 St. George Illawarra Dragons season =

- NRL rank: 6th
- Play-off result: Runners-Up
- 1999 record: Wins: 18; draws: 0; losses: 10
- Points scored: For: 692; against: 472

Team information
- Coach: David Waite
- Captain: Paul McGregor
- Stadium: Jubilee Oval, Wollongong Showground
- Avg. attendance: 13,259
- High attendance: 19,181 (vs. Newcastle, round 24)

Top scorers
- Tries: Nathan Blacklock (24)
- Goals: Wayne Bartrim (71)
- Points: Wayne Bartrim (162)
2000 →

The 1999 St. George Illawarra Dragons season was the first in the joint venture club's history. The Dragons competed in the NRL's 1999 premiership season. The team finished sixth in the regular season, before making and losing the grand final against the Melbourne Storm in front of a record-breaking crowd, with 107,999 people in attendance at the new Stadium Australia.

== Squad gains and losses ==
▲ or ▼	Player	1998 Club	1999 Club
▲	Warren Carney	N/A	St. George Illawarra Dragons
▲	Trent Barrett	Illawarra Steelers	St. George Illawarra Dragons
▲	Craig Fitzgibbon	Illawarra Steelers	St. George Illawarra Dragons
▲	Brad Mackay	Illawarra Steelers	St. George Illawarra Dragons
▲	Paul McGregor	Illawarra Steelers	St. George Illawarra Dragons
▲	Craig Smith	Illawarra Steelers	St. George Illawarra Dragons
▲	Shaun Timmins	Illawarra Steelers	St. George Illawarra Dragons
▲	Andrew Hart	Illawarra Steelers	St. George Illawarra Dragons
▲	Luke Patten	Illawarra Steelers	St. George Illawarra Dragons
▲	Chris Leikvoll	Illawarra Steelers	St. George Illawarra Dragons
▲	Rod Wishart	Illawarra Steelers	St. George Illawarra Dragons
▲	Jason Hooper	Illawarra Steelers	St. George Illawarra Dragons
▲	Terry Lamey	Illawarra Steelers	St. George Illawarra Dragons
▲	Jamie Ainscough	St. George Dragons	St. George Illawarra Dragons
▲	Wayne Bartrim	St. George Dragons	St. George Illawarra Dragons
▲	Nathan Blacklock	St. George Dragons	St. George Illawarra Dragons
▲	Nathan Brown	St. George Dragons	St. George Illawarra Dragons
▲	Mark Coyne	St. George Dragons	St. George Illawarra Dragons
▲	Anthony Mundine	St. George Dragons	St. George Illawarra Dragons
▲	Lee Murphy	St. George Dragons	St. George Illawarra Dragons
▲	Corey Pearson	St. George Dragons	St. George Illawarra Dragons
▲	Lance Thompson	St. George Dragons	St. George Illawarra Dragons
▲	Darren Treacy	St. George Dragons	St. George Illawarra Dragons
▲	Colin Ward	St. George Dragons	St. George Illawarra Dragons
▲	Matthew Rodwell	St. George Dragons	St. George Illawarra Dragons

== Ladder ==
1999 NRL season
Pos	Team	Pld	W	D	L	B	PF	PA	PD	Pts
1	Cronulla-Sutherland Sharks	24	18	0	6	2	586	332	+254	40
2	Parramatta Eels	24	17	0	7	2	500	294	+206	38
3	Melbourne Storm (P)	24	16	0	8	2	639	392	+247	36
4	Sydney City Roosters	24	16	0	8	2	592	377	+215	36
5	Canterbury-Bankstown Bulldogs	24	15	1	8	2	520	462	+58	35
6	St. George Illawarra Dragons	24	15	0	9	2	588	416	+172	34
7	Newcastle Knights	24	14	1	9	2	575	484	+91	33
8	Brisbane Broncos	24	13	2	9	2	510	368	+142	32
9	Canberra Raiders	24	13	1	10	2	618	439	+179	31
10	Penrith Panthers	24	11	1	12	2	492	428	+64	27
11	Auckland Warriors	24	10	0	14	2	538	498	+40	24
12	South Sydney Rabbitohs	24	10	0	14	2	349	556	-207	24
13	Manly Warringah Sea Eagles	24	9	1	14	2	454	623	-169	23
14	North Sydney Bears	24	8	0	16	2	490	642	-152	20
15	Balmain Tigers	24	8	0	16	2	345	636	-291	20
16	North Queensland Cowboys	24	4	1	19	2	398	588	-190	13
17	Western Suburbs Magpies	24	3	0	21	2	285	944	-659	10

=== Ladder progression ===
Round	1	2	3	4	5	6	7	8	9	10	11	12	13	14	15	16	17	18	19	20	21	22	23	24	25	26
Ladder Position	13th	15th	13th	13th	13th	9th	6th	9th	6th	10th	11th	10th	9th	8th	7th	6th	5th	4th	4th	4th	6th	5th	7th	7th	7th	6th

== Season results ==
Round	Home	Score	Away	Match Information
Round	Home	Score	Away	Date	Venue	Referee	Attendance	Source
1	Parramatta Eels	20 – 10	St. George Illawarra Dragons	6 March	Stadium Australia	Bill Harrigan	104,583
2	St. George Illawarra Dragons	18 – 24	Canterbury-Bankstown Bulldogs	14 March	Jubilee Oval	Tim Mander	13,487
3	Canberra Raiders	14 – 16	St. George Illawarra Dragons	20 March	Canberra Stadium	Sean Hampstead	11,096
4	South Sydney Rabbitohs	25 – 24	St. George Illawarra Dragons	27 March	Sydney Cricket Ground	Brian Grant	15,324
5	St. George Illawarra Dragons	32 – 12	North Sydney Bears	4 April	Wollongong Showground	Paul McBlane	12,566
6	Newcastle Knights	12 – 26	St. George Illawarra Dragons	11 April	Newcastle International Sports Centre	Bill Harrigan	22,532
7	St. George Illawarra Dragons	44 – 2	Canberra Raiders	18 April	Jubilee Oval	Steve Clark	12,237
8	Cronulla-Sutherland Sharks	18 – 16	St. George Illawarra Dragons	25 April	Endeavour Field	Sean Hampstead	22,279
9	St. George Illawarra Dragons	20 – 16	Sydney City Roosters	1 May	Wollongong Showground	Brian Grant	14,731
10	Penrith Panthers	27 – 6	St. George Illawarra Dragons	8 May	Penrith Stadium	Tim Mander	19,133
11	St. George Illawarra Dragons	12 – 20	Cronulla-Sutherland Sharks	14 May	Jubilee Oval	Steve Clark	16,514
12	St. George Illawarra Dragons	48 – 8	Balmain Tigers	22 May	Wollongong Showground	Bill Harrigan	11,120
13	Melbourne Storm	16 – 28	St. George Illawarra Dragons	28 May	Olympic Park Stadium	Steve Clark	14,316
14		BYE
15	St. George Illawarra Dragons	22 – 18	North Queensland Cowboys	13 June	Jubilee Oval	Paul McBlane	8,156
16	St. George Illawarra Dragons	44 – 4	Western Suburbs Magpies	20 June	Wollongong Showground	Brian Grant	11,117
17	North Sydney Bears	12 – 20	St. George Illawarra Dragons	27 June	North Sydney Oval	Sean Hampstead	6,774
18		BYE
19	St. George Illawarra Dragons	38 – 24	Penrith Panthers	11 July	Jubilee Oval	Bill Harrigan	11,555
20	Balmain Tigers	16 – 38	St. George Illawarra Dragons	17 July	Leichhardt Oval	Moghsheen Jadwat	10,615
21	Brisbane Broncos	22 – 4	St. George Illawarra Dragons	23 July	Queensland Sport and Athletics Centre	Steve Clark	33,289
22	St. George Illawarra Dragons	38 – 10	South Sydney Rabbitohs	1 August	Wollongong Showground	Tim Mander	14,517
23	Auckland Warriors	18 – 32	St. George Illawarra Dragons	6 August	Mount Smart Stadium	Tim Mander	9,564
24	St. George Illawarra Dragons	20 – 22	Newcastle Knights	13 August	Sydney Football Stadium	Bill Harrigan	19,181
25	Sydney City Roosters	24 – 26	St. George Illawarra Dragons	22 August	Sydney Football Stadium	Steve Clark	24,271
26	St. George Illawarra Dragons	20 – 18	Manly Warringah Sea Eagles	28 August	Wollongong Showground	Sean Hampstead	13,918
FW1	Melbourne Storm	10 – 34	St. George Illawarra Dragons	4 September	Olympic Park Stadium	Bill Harrigan	15,653
FW2	Sydney City Roosters	18 – 28	St. George Illawarra Dragons	11 September	Sydney Football Stadium	Bill Harrigan	31,506
FW3	Cronulla-Sutherland Sharks	8 – 24	St. George Illawarra Dragons	19 September	Stadium Australia	Steve Clark	51,827
GF	Melbourne Storm	20 – 18	St. George Illawarra Dragons	26 September	Stadium Australia	Bill Harrigan	107,999
