= 1996 ARL season =

Rugby league competition

1996 Australian Rugby League
- Duration: 22 March – 29 September 1996
- Teams: 20
- Premiers: Manly-Warringah (6th title)
- Minor premiers: Manly-Warringah (8th title)
- Matches played: 223
- Points scored: 8,547
- Average attendance: 12,303
- Total attendance: 2,743,516
- Top points scorer: Jason Taylor (238)
- Wooden spoon: South Qld Crushers (1st spoon)
- Rothmans Medal: Jason Taylor
- Top try-scorer: Noa Nadruku (21)

The 1996 ARL premiership (also known as the 1996 Optus Cup due to sponsorship from Optus) was the 89th season of professional rugby league football in Australia, and the second to be administered by the Australian Rugby League (ARL). Twenty teams contested the premiership, including five Sydney-based foundation teams, another six from Sydney, two from greater New South Wales, four from Queensland, and one each from New Zealand, the Australian Capital Territory and Western Australia. Ultimately two Sydney clubs, the Manly-Warringah Sea Eagles and St. George Dragons contested the grand final.

The grand finals:

- Manly-Warringah Sea Eagles vs St. George Dragons (Senior Grade)
- Cronulla Sharks vs Auckland Warriors (Reserve Grade)
- South Queensland Crushers vs Parramatta Eels (Under-20s Grade)

The winners in all grades were:

- Manly-Warringah Sea Eagles (Senior Grade)
- Cronulla Sharks (Reserve Grade)
- South Queensland Crushers (Under-20s Grade)

The test match

- Australia vs Fiji

The State of Origin Series

- Queensland vs New South Wales

The Region of Origin Series

- City vs Country

== Teams ==
The lineup of teams remained unchanged from the previous season except for the re-branding of Gold Coast from the "Seagulls" to the "Chargers" as the ARL took control of the club.

=== Teams ===
Team	Nickname	Colours	Jersey	Season	Home Ground	Coach	Captain
Auckland	Warriors			2nd season	Mt. Smart Stadium	John Monie	Greg Alexander
Brisbane	Broncos			9th season	QEII Stadium	Wayne Bennett	Allan Langer
Canberra	Raiders			15th season	Bruce Stadium	Tim Sheens	Ricky Stuart→ Laurie Daley
Canterbury	Bulldogs			44th season	Parramatta Stadium	Chris Anderson	Simon Gillies
Cronulla	Sharks			12th season	Endeavour Field	Norm Provan	Greg Pierce
Gold Coast	Chargers			9th season	Seagulls Stadium	Phil Economidis	Dave Watson
Illawarra	Steelers			15th season	Wollongong Stadium	Allan McMahon	John Cross → Paul McGregor
Manly	Sea Eagles			50th season	Brookvale Oval	Bob Fulton	Geoff Toovey
Newcastle	Knights			9th season	Marathon Stadium	Malcolm "Mal" Reilly	Paul Harragon
North Queensland	Cowboys			2nd season	Stockland Stadium	Graham Lowe	Dean Schifilliti
North Sydney	Bears			72nd season	North Sydney Oval	Peter Louis	Jason Taylor
Parramatta	Eels			49th season	Parramatta Stadium	Ron Hilditch	Gary Freeman → Jarrod McCracken
Penrith	Panthers			12th season	Penrith Stadium	Royce Simmons	Steve Carter
St. George	Dragons			59th season	Kogarah Oval	David Waite	Mark Coyne
South Queensland	Crushers			2nd season	Lang Park	Bob Lindner	Trevor Gillmeister
South Sydney	Rabbitohs			72nd season	Sydney Football Stadium	Ken Shine	Craig Field → Craig Salvatori
Sydney City (East. Subs.)	Roosters			72nd season	Sydney Football Stadium	Phil Gould	Sean Garlick
Sydney (Balmain)	Tigers			72nd season	Parramatta Stadium	Wayne Pearce	Paul Sironen
Western	Reds			2nd season	WACA Ground	Peter Mulholland	Mark Geyer
West. Subs.	Magpies			72nd season	Lidcombe Oval	Roy Masters	Tom Raudonikis

== Regular season ==
With the Super League war in full effect off the field, those clubs affiliated with the breakaway competition refused to participate in five games of Round 1, all forfeited to ARL-aligned clubs and only four of the ten scheduled games took place. Of the two games between two Super League clubs, Canterbury versus North Queensland was cancelled, whilst Auckland flew a team consisting of players from the Otahuhu Leopards and Ellerslie Eagles clubs to Brisbane and were thus declared winners over the Broncos by forfeit.

Following up on their performance in the 1995 season up to the grand final, Manly-Warringah dominated the season with their defence, which conceded only 34 tries in 25 matches, the best record of any team since the six-tackle rule was introduced in 1971. Indeed, the Sea Eagles only conceded 191 points during the minor round, an average of only 8.7 points per game, while scoring 549 points at 24.9 points per game. Their 1995 rivals Canberra were hit by injuries which wiped out the seasons of key players including captain Ricky Stuart, Bradley Clyde and Jason Croker, and suspensions to Kiwi props John Lomax and Quentin Pongia.

Super League-aligned Canterbury were also hit by the loss of key players Jim Dymock, Dean Pay, Jason Smith and Jarrod McCracken to ARL-loyal Parramatta and Brett Dallas to North Sydney. Sydney City started the season in good form, but fell off after winning their first ten games, whilst Brisbane (with Allan Langer putting in some strong performances) dominated early but as had become their custom, lost ground mid-season during the Origin period. North Sydney, with a powerful forward pack and skillful goal-kicking half Jason Taylor feeding a superb set of outside backs, were expected to make the Grand Final, but as had become their habit in the 1990s they lost the preliminary final, this time to St. George.

The 20-team competition in 1995 and 1996 caused frequent jackpots in FootyTAB's "Pick The Margins" and after three successive rounds without a single winner, on 8 July 1996 after a last-minute Sydney City penalty goal, one punter received an all-time record for any form of sports betting in Australia: $2,006,217.

This year Canterbury-Bankstown back Terry Lamb set new record for most first-grade premiership games at 350 before retiring at the end of the season.

North Sydney's Jason Taylor won the official player of the year award, the Rothmans Medal, while the Dally M Medal was awarded to Brisbane's Allan Langer.

At the end of the season, ARL chief executive John Quayle resigned and was replaced by Balmain president (and former hooker) Neil Whittaker.

Team	1	2	3	4	5	6	7	8	9	10	11	12	13	14	15	16	17	18	19	20	21	22	F1	F2	F3	GF
Auckland Warriors	BRI; Forfeit	**ILA** **+8**	WES −14	**NOR** **+4**	MAN −12	ILA +10	**PAR** **+24**	ROS −12	**NEW** **−4**	**CRO** **−4**	**TIG** **−12**	PEN +10	**WES** **+16**	**SOU** **+14**	GCC +14	WRD −20	**SQC** **+4**	**NQL** **+46**	STG −29	**CBY** **−2**	CAN −24	**BRI** **−32**				
Brisbane Broncos	ACK; Forfeit	WES +22	**ILA** **+50**	SQC +20	**NQL** **+44**	STG +18	CBY +22	**CAN** **+34**	WRD +8	**NOR** **−6**	**MAN** **−14**	ILA −8	**PAR** **+6**	ROS −2	**NEW** **+5**	CRO +3	**TIG** **+20**	PEN +30	**WES** **+30**	SOU +2	**GCC** **+28**	ACK +32	**NOR** **−5**	CRO −6		
Canberra Raiders	SQC; Forfeit	PEN; 0	**PAR** **−6**	**NQL** **+56**	STG −10	**CBY** **+30**	WRD +20	BRI −34	**NOR** **+34**	MAN −16	**ILA** **+2**	PAR −40	**ROS** **+4**	NEW +2	**CRO** **−8**	TIG +18	**PEN** **+16**	WES −8	**SOU** **+30**	GCC +14	**ACK** **+24**	SQC +26	STG −2			
Canterbury-Bankstown Bulldogs	−	TIG −4	ROS −6	**STG** **−20**	WRD +4	CAN −30	**BRI** **−22**	NOR −8	MAN −20	**ILA** **+12**	**PAR** **+18**	**ROS** **+12**	**NEW** **+10**	CRO −10	**TIG** **−2**	PEN +2	**WES** **−4**	SOU +24	**GCC** **+10**	ACK +2	**SQC** **+1**	**NQL** **+28**				
Cronulla-Sutherland Sharks	NEW; Forfeit	**STG** **+8**	WRD −7	**WRD** **+14**	TIG +20	**PEN** **+8**	WES −8	**SOU** **+18**	**GCC** **+8**	ACK +4	**SQC** **+24**	NQL −6	STG; 0	**CBY** **+10**	CAN +8	**BRI** **−3**	NOR; 0	**MAN** **+2**	ILA −7	**PAR** **+8**	ROS +8	**NEW** **+22**	**WES** **+8**	**BRI** **+6**	MAN −24	
Gold Coast Chargers	**NOR** **−16**	MAN −14	SOU +2	**MAN** **−4**	**ILA** **+8**	PAR +13	**ROS** **−3**	NEW −42	CRO −8	**TIG** **+12**	**PEN** **−6**	WES −32	**SOU** **−2**	WRD; 0	**ACK** **−14**	SQC +48	**NQL** **−10**	**STG** **−12**	CBY −10	**CAN** **−14**	BRI −28	NOR −30				
Illawarra Steelers	**WES** **−9**	ACK −8	BRI −50	**SOU** **+42**	GCC −8	**ACK** **−10**	**SQC** **+4**	NQL +16	**STG** **+6**	CBY −12	CAN −2	**BRI** **+8**	NOR −30	**MAN** **−8**	**WRD** **−1**	PAR −16	**ROS** **−16**	NEW +12	**CRO** **+7**	TIG −2	**PEN** **+40**	WES −4				
Manly Warringah Sea Eagles	**SOU** **+38**	**GCC** **+14**	NOR −10	GCC +4	**ACK** **+12**	SQC +8	**NQL** **+42**	STG +4	**CBY** **+20**	**CAN** **+16**	BRI +14	**NOR** **+23**	WRD −3	ILA +8	**PAR** **+44**	ROS +28	**NEW** **+16**	CRO −2	**TIG** **+18**	PEN −4	**WES** **+30**	SOU +38	ROS +2	X	**CRO** **+24**	**STG** **+12**
Newcastle Knights	CRO; Forfeit	WRD +6	STG −4	**TIG** **−12**	PEN +2	**WES** **+22**	SOU +6	**GCC** **+42**	ACK +4	**SQC** **+16**	NQL −16	**STG** **+11**	CBY −10	**CAN** **−2**	BRI −5	**NOR**; **0**	MAN −16	**ILA** **−12**	PAR −2	**ROS** **+16**	**WRD** **+4**	CRO −22				
North Queensland Cowboys	−	**ROS** **−38**	**TIG** **+15**	CAN −56	BRI −44	**NOR** **−44**	MAN −42	**ILA** **−16**	**PAR** **−14**	ROS −24	**NEW** **+16**	**CRO** **+6**	TIG −2	**PEN** **−21**	WES −8	**SOU** **−2**	GCC +10	ACK −46	**SQC** **+5**	WRD −26	STG +4	CBY −28				
North Sydney Bears	GCC +16	SOU +16	**MAN** **+10**	ACK −4	**SQC** **+14**	NQL +44	**STG** **+42**	**CBY** **+8**	CAN −34	BRI +6	**WRD** **+22**	MAN −23	**ILA** **+30**	PAR +2	**ROS** **−5**	NEW; 0	**CRO**; **0**	TIG +24	**PEN** **+34**	WES −1	**SOU** **+42**	**GCC** **+30**	BRI +5	X	**STG** **−17**	
Parramatta Eels	PEN; Forfeit	SQC −4	CAN +6	**WES** **−4**	SOU +28	**GCC** **−13**	ACK −24	**SQC** **+10**	NQL +14	**STG** **+4**	CBY −18	**CAN** **+40**	BRI −6	**NOR** **−2**	MAN −44	**ILA** **+16**	**WRD** **+12**	ROS; 0	**NEW** **+2**	CRO −8	**TIG** **−12**	PEN −8				
Penrith Panthers	PAR; Forfeit	**CAN**; **0**	SQC +18	ROS −16	**NEW** **−2**	CRO −8	**TIG** **−2**	**WRD** **+34**	WES −10	**SOU** **+8**	GCC +6	**ACK** **−10**	**SQC** **−4**	NQL +21	STG −26	**CBY** **−2**	CAN −16	**BRI** **−30**	NOR −34	**MAN** **+4**	ILA −40	**PAR** **+8**				
South Queensland Crushers	CAN; Forfeit	**PAR** **+4**	**PEN** **−18**	**BRI** **−20**	NOR −14	**MAN** **−8**	ILA −4	PAR −10	**ROS** **−26**	NEW −16	CRO −24	**TIG** **−10**	PEN +4	**WES** **+2**	SOU −32	**GCC** **−48**	ACK −4	**WRD** **−2**	NQL −5	**STG** **−18**	CBY −1	**CAN** **−26**				
South Sydney Rabbitohs	MAN −38	**NOR** **−16**	**GCC** **−2**	ILA −42	**PAR** **−28**	ROS −62	**NEW** **−6**	CRO −18	**TIG** **+28**	PEN −8	WES; 0	**WRD** **+6**	GCC +2	ACK −14	**SQC** **+32**	NQL +2	**STG** **−20**	**CBY** **−24**	CAN −30	**BRI** **−2**	NOR −42	**MAN** **−38**				
St. George Dragons	WRD; Forfeit	CRO −8	**NEW** **+4**	CBY +20	**CAN** **+10**	**BRI** **−18**	NOR −42	**MAN** **−4**	ILA −6	PAR −4	**ROS** **+16**	NEW −11	**CRO**; **0**	TIG +11	**PEN** **+26**	**WES** **+8**	SOU +20	GCC +12	**ACK** **+29**	SQC +18	**NQL** **−4**	WRD +6	**CAN** **+2**	ROS +20	NOR +17	MAN −12
Sydney Tigers	ROS −28	**CBY** **+4**	NQL −15	NEW +12	**CRO** **−20**	**WRD** **+4**	PEN +2	**WES** **+6**	SOU −28	GCC −12	ACK +12	SQC +10	**NQL** **+2**	**STG** **−11**	CBY +2	**CAN** **−18**	BRI −20	**NOR** **−24**	MAN −18	**ILA** **+2**	PAR +12	**ROS** **−14**				
Sydney City Roosters	**TIG** **+28**	NQL +38	**CBY** **+6**	**PEN** **+16**	WES +20	**SOU** **+62**	GCC +3	**ACK** **+12**	SQC +26	**NQL** **+24**	STG −16	CBY −12	CAN −4	**BRI** **+2**	NOR +5	**MAN** **−28**	ILA +16	**PAR**; **0**	**WRD** **+12**	NEW −16	**CRO** **−8**	TIG +14	**MAN** **−2**	**STG** **−20**		
Western Reds	STG; Forfeit	**NEW** **−6**	**CRO** **+7**	CRO −14	**CBY** **−4**	TIG −4	**CAN** **−20**	PEN −34	**BRI** **−8**	**WES** **−14**	NOR −22	SOU −6	**MAN** **+3**	**GCC**; **0**	ILA +1	**ACK** **+20**	PAR −12	SQC +2	ROS −12	**NQL** **+26**	NEW −4	**STG** **−6**				
Western Suburbs Magpies	ILA +9	**BRI** **−22**	**ACK** **+14**	PAR +4	**ROS** **−20**	NEW −22	**CRO** **+8**	TIG −6	**PEN** **+10**	WRD +14	**SOU**; **0**	**GCC** **+32**	ACK −16	SQC −2	**NQL** **+8**	STG −8	CBY +4	**CAN** **+8**	BRI −30	**NOR** **+1**	MAN −30	**ILA** **+4**	CRO −8			
Team	1	2	3	4	5	6	7	8	9	10	11	12	13	14	15	16	17	18	19	20	21	22	F1	F2	F3	GF

Bold – Home game
X – Bye
Opponent for round listed above margin

=== Ladder ===
	Team	Pld	W	D	L	PF	PA	PD	Pts
1	**Manly Sea Eagles** **(P)**	22	18	0	4	549	191	+358	36
2	Brisbane Broncos	21	17	0	4	607	263	+344	34
3	North Sydney Bears	22	15	2	5	598	325	+273	32
4	Sydney City Roosters (Eastern Suburbs Roosters)	22	15	1	6	521	321	+200	31
5	Cronulla Sharks	21	14	2	5	399	268	+131	30
6	Canberra Raiders	21	13	1	7	538	384	+154	27
7	St. George Dragons	21	12	1	8	443	360	+83	27
8	Western Suburbs Magpies	22	12	1	9	394	434	−40	25
9	Newcastle Knights	21	10	1	10	416	388	+28	23
10	Canterbury Bullddgs	21	11	0	10	375	378	−3	22
11	Auckland Warriors	22	11	0	11	412	427	−15	22
12	Sydney Tigers (Balmain Tigers)	22	11	0	11	319	459	−140	22
13	Parramatta Eels	21	9	1	11	404	415	−11	21
14	Illawarra Steelers	22	8	0	14	403	444	−41	16
15	Penrith Panthers	21	7	1	13	363	464	−101	15
16	Western Reds	21	6	1	14	313	420	−107	13
17	North Queensland Cowboys	21	6	0	15	288	643	−355	12
18	Gold Coast Chargers	22	5	1	16	359	521	−162	11
19	South Sydney Rabbitohs	22	5	1	16	314	634	−320	11
20	South Queensland Crushers	21	3	0	18	220	496	−276	8

=== Ladder progression ===
- Numbers highlighted in green indicate that the team finished the round inside the top 8.
- Numbers highlighted in blue indicates the team finished first on the ladder in that round.
- Numbers highlighted in red indicates the team finished in last place on the ladder in that round

	Team	1^{1}	2	3	4	5	6	7	8	9	10	11	12	13	14	15	16	17	18	19	20	21	22
1	**Manly-Warringah**	2	4	4	6	8	10	12	14	16	18	20	22	22	24	26	28	30	30	32	32	34	36
2	Brisbane	0	2	4	6	8	10	12	14	16	16	16	16	18	18	20	22	24	26	28	30	32	34
3	North Sydney	2	4	6	6	8	10	12	14	14	16	18	18	20	22	22	23	24	26	28	28	30	32
4	Sydney City	2	4	6	8	10	12	14	16	18	20	20	20	20	22	24	24	26	27	29	29	29	31
5	Cronulla-Sutherland	0	2	2	4	6	8	8	10	12	14	16	16	17	19	21	21	22	24	24	26	28	30
6	Canberra	0	1	1	3	3	5	7	7	9	9	11	11	13	15	15	17	19	19	21	23	25	27
7	St George	2	2	4	6	8	8	8	8	8	8	10	10	11	13	15	17	19	21	23	25	25	27
8	Western Suburbs	2	2	4	6	6	6	8	8	10	12	13	15	15	15	17	17	19	21	21	23	23	25
9	Newcastle	2	4	4	4	6	8	10	12	14	16	16	18	18	18	18	19	19	19	19	21	23	23
10	Sydney Bulldogs	0	0	0	0	2	2	2	2	2	4	6	8	10	10	10	12	12	14	16	18	20	22
11	Auckland	2	4	4	6	6	8	10	10	10	10	10	12	14	16	18	18	20	22	22	22	22	22
12	Sydney Tigers	0	2	2	4	4	6	8	10	10	10	12	14	16	16	18	18	18	18	18	20	22	22
13	Parramatta	2	2	4	4	6	6	6	8	10	12	12	14	14	14	14	16	18	19	21	21	21	21
14	Illawarra	0	0	0	2	2	2	4	6	8	8	8	10	10	10	10	10	10	12	14	14	16	16
15	Penrith	0	1	3	3	3	3	3	5	5	7	9	9	9	11	11	11	11	11	11	13	13	15
16	Western Reds	0	0	2	2	2	2	2	2	2	2	2	2	4	5	7	9	9	11	11	13	13	13
17	North Queensland	0	0	2	2	2	2	2	2	2	2	4	6	6	6	6	6	8	8	10	10	12	12
18	Gold Coast	0	0	2	2	4	6	6	6	6	8	8	8	8	9	9	11	11	11	11	11	11	11
19	South Sydney	0	0	0	0	0	0	0	0	2	2	3	5	7	7	9	11	11	11	11	11	11	11
20	South Queensland	2	4	4	4	4	4	4	4	4	4	4	4	6	8	8	8	8	8	8	8	8	8

^{1} - Due to the Super League war, clubs aligned with the Super League refused to take part in round 1. As such, only 4 games were played, all between two ARL-aligned teams. Of the remaining 6 games, Super League teams Canberra, Penrith, Cronulla and the Western Reds forfeited their games to the ARL-aligned clubs South Queensland, Parramatta, Newcastle and St George respectively. The match between Canterbury and North Queensland was cancelled, and Brisbane forfeited to Auckland due to Auckland fielding a team consisting of players from the Otahuhu Leopards and Ellerslie Eagles clubs. As a result of the forfeitures, 9 teams were in the top 8 after the first round due to ties on points differential.

== Finals ==
Home	Score	Away	Match Information
Home	Score	Away	Date and Time	Venue	Referee	Crowd
Qualifying Finals
Cronulla Sharks	20–12	Western Suburbs Magpies	6 September 1996	Parramatta Stadium	David Manson	22,433
Brisbane Broncos	16–21	North Sydney Bears	7 September 1996	Suncorp Stadium*	Eddie Ward	25,983
Canberra Raiders	14–16	St. George Dragons	7 September 1996	Sydney Football Stadium	Kelvin Jeffes	28,185
Manly Sea Eagles	16–14	Sydney City Roosters	8 September 1996	Sydney Football Stadium	Paul McBlane	31,327
Semi-finals
Brisbane Broncos	16–22	Cronulla Sharks	14 September 1996	Sydney Football Stadium	Kelvin Jeffes	27,665
Sydney City Roosters	16–36	St. George Dragons	15 September 1996	Sydney Football Stadium	David Manson	37,858
Preliminary Finals
North Sydney Bears	12–29	St. George Dragons	21 September 1996	Sydney Football Stadium	Kelvin Jeffes	37,779
Manly Sea Eagles	24–0	Cronulla Sharks	22 September 1996	Sydney Football Stadium	David Manson	40,525
Grand Final
Manly Sea Eagles	20–8	St. George Dragons	29 September 1996	Sydney Football Stadium	David Manson	40,985

- Although Brisbane's home ground during the 1996 ARL season was ANZ Stadium this game was played at Suncorp.

=== Chart ===
Qualifying and elimination finals
8 Sept, Sydney Football Stadium
1	Manly	16
4	Sydney City	14
6 Sept, Parramatta Stadium
5	Cronulla	20
8	Western Suburbs	12
7 Sept, Sydney Football Stadium
6	Canberra	14
7	St. George	16
7 Sept, Suncorp Stadium
2	Brisbane	16
3	North Sydney	21

Semi-finals
15 Sept, Sydney Football Stadium
Sydney City	16
St. George	36
14 Sept, Sydney Football Stadium
Brisbane	16
Cronulla	22

Preliminary finals
22 Sept, Sydney Football Stadium
Manly	24
Cronulla	0
21 Sept, Sydney Football Stadium
North Sydney	12
St. George	29

Grand final
29 Sept, Sydney Football Stadium
Manly	20
St. George	8

== Grand Final ==
1996 ARL Grand Final
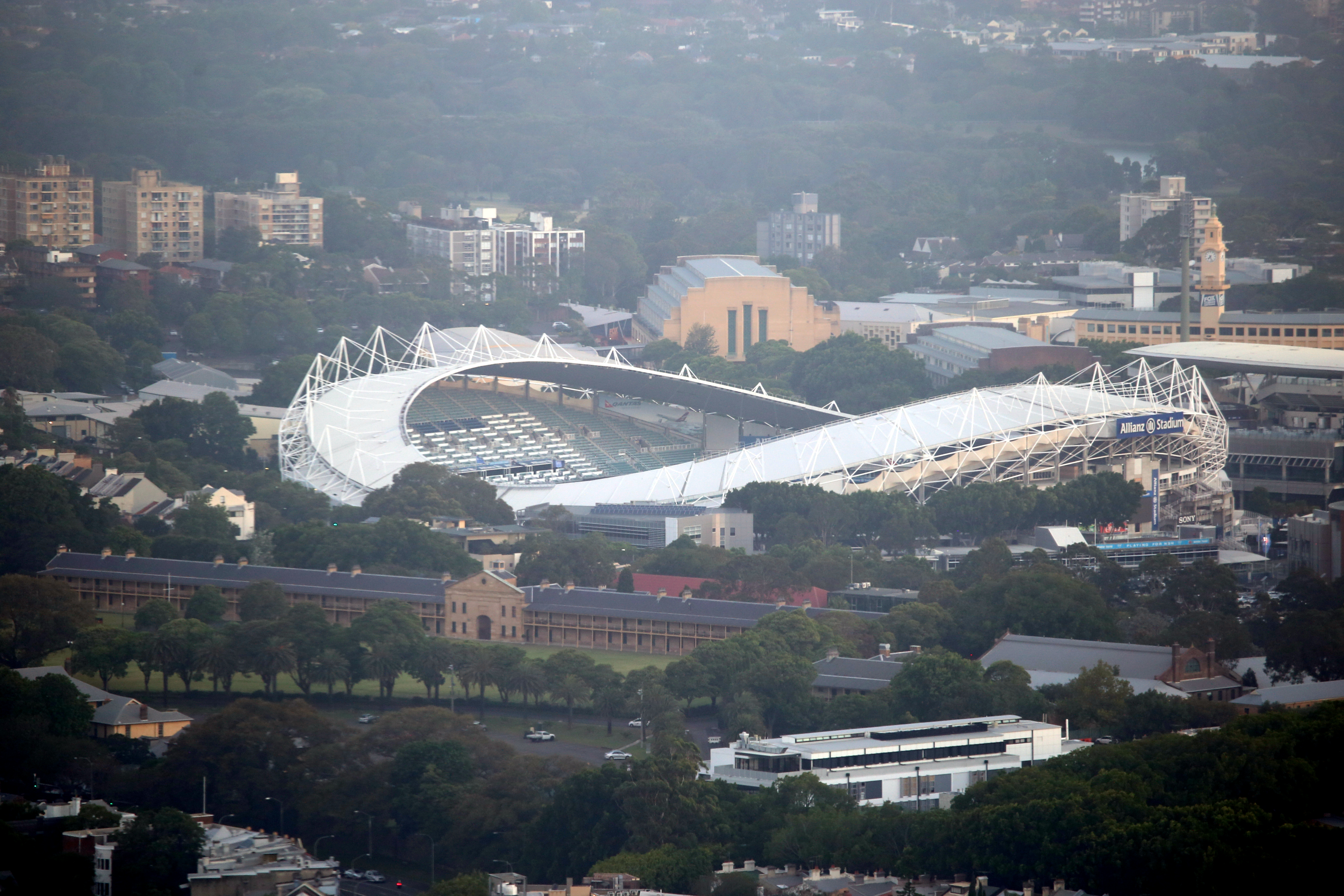
- An aerial view of the Sydney Football Stadium, where the match was played

Manly Warringah Sea Eagles	St George Dragons
20	8
	1	2	Total
MAN	14	6	20
STG	2	6	8
- Date: 29 September 1996
- Stadium: Sydney Football Stadium
- Location: Sydney
- Clive Churchill Medal: Geoff Toovey (MAN)
- Australian National anthem: Kate Ceberano
- Referee: David Manson
- Attendance: 40,985

Broadcast partners
- Broadcasters: Nine Network
- Commentators: Ken Sutcliffe (host); Ray Warren; Peter Sterling; Paul Vautin Phil Gould; Steve Roach & Gary Belcher (sideline)

This was the last Grand Final to feature two Sydney-based teams until 2003. 40,985 people were at the Sydney Football Stadium for the match, the lowest attendance since 1989. The match was refereed by Queenslander David Manson. For St. George, it was their third Grand Final appearance in the 1990s and would prove to be their last as a stand-alone club. Manly, looking for their sixth premiership, had been beaten Grand Finalists in 1995.

This would be the third and final time the two clubs would meet in a Grand Final, with St George having been victorious on both previous occasions in 1957 and 1959.

The pre-game entertainment focused on the 40th anniversary of television in Australia, as match broadcaster Channel 9 had been the first TV station in 1956. Music artists who performed in the pre-game included Glenn Shorrock, The Delltones, Ross Wilson, Christine Anu, and Kate Ceberano, who sang a video replay duet of "I Still Call Australia Home" with the late Australian entertainer Peter Allen (as Allen had died in 1992, he only appeared on the stadiums video replay screen).

Kate Ceberano also performed the Australian national anthem.

=== Teams ===
Team details
Manly Warringah Sea Eagles		Position	St. George Dragons
Name	Number	Position	Number	Name
Matthew Ridge	1	Fullback	1	Dean Raper
Danny Moore	2	Wing	2	Nick Zisti
Craig Innes	3	Centre	3	Mark Coyne (c)
Terry Hill	4	Centre	4	Mark Bell
John Hopoate	5	Wing	5	Adrian Brunker
Nik Kosef	13	Five eighth	6	Anthony Mundine
Geoff Toovey (c)	7	Half back	7	Noel Goldthorpe
David Gillespie	17	Prop forward	8	Troy Stone
Jim Serdaris	9	Hooker	9	Jeff Hardy
Mark Carroll	10	Prop forward	10	Luke Felsch
Steve Menzies	11	Second row	19	Kevin Campion
Daniel Gartner	12	Second row	12	Scott Gourley
Owen Cunningham	8	Lock forward	13	Wayne Bartrim
Cliff Lyons	6	Interchange	11	David Barnhill
Neil Tierney	14	Interchange	14	Lance Thompson
Des Hasler	16	Interchange	15	Colin Ward
Craig Hancock	19	Interchange	16	Nathan Brown
Bob Fulton		Coach		David Waite

=== First half ===
In the fifth minute, Manly centre Craig Innes won the chase and scored after a grubber kick by his skipper Geoff Toovey. Matthew Ridge converted from the sideline for 6–0. The Dragons played on after being awarded a penalty in front of the posts in the eighth minute but failed to score. At the 15-minute mark, Saints' halfback Noel Goldthorpe conceded a penalty right in front of their goal posts after committing a head-high tackle on Manly's Daniel Gartner. Ridge took the kick, extending the lead to 8–0. St. George sent in forward replacements Lance Thompson and David Barnhill for Scott Gourley and Kevin Campion (head cut). For Manly, Neil Tierney came off the interchange bench to replace David Gillespie. Up until the 19th minute mark when Manly veteran five-eighth Cliff Lyons took the field, their coach Bob Fulton was using six running forwards with captain Geoff Toovey as dummy half.

The Dragons' first points came in the 37th minute when Wayne Bartrim kicked a penalty that was awarded when Manly forward Owen Cunningham stripped the ball. From the ensuing kick-off just before half-time, the game's controversial moment occurred by means of a hotly disputed try. Ridge made a spectacular short kick-off and regathered, catching the Dragons unaware. St George hooker Nathan Brown appeared to tackle Ridge, albeit one-handedly and by the collar. Ridge got up and ran when Brown was expecting him to stop and play the ball. Referee David Manson ruled that Brown did not complete the tackle. Ridge was eventually tackled just a few metres from the line. From there, dummy half Nik Kosef then passed the ball to Steve Menzies, who stormed his way through the Saints' defense of Thompson, Dean Raper, Noel Goldthorpe and Wayne Bartrim to score next to the posts, giving Ridge an easy conversion kick. The controversial ruling by referee Manson gave Manly a 14–2 half-time lead and broke the Saints' resolve. In the process of scoring, Menzies injured his groin/hamstring; and, although he returned for the second half, he was unable to run and was eventually interchanged by coach Fulton.

=== Second half ===
In the 53rd minute, Manly's Danny Moore scored a try from a Terry Hill pass after Hill drew Saints defenders Adrian Brunker and Nick Zisti. With Ridge off the field after being concussed in a tackle, Craig Innes converted from five metres off the sideline for the Sea Eagles to take a 20–2 lead. Five minutes later, Dragons' winger Zisti scored a try from a Bartrim cut-out pass. Bartrim then converted from the sideline for a final scoreline of 20–8. The final 20 minutes were scoreless, with two field goal attempts from Ridge charged down by Dragons' defenders. This ensured that the Sea Eagles secured their sixth official premiership and their only one of the 1990s.

=== Scoreboard ===
1996 ARL Optus Cup Grand Final

Sunday, 29 September
15:00 AEST (UTC+10)

Manly Warringah Sea Eagles	20 – 8	St. George Dragons
Tries: 3 Innes 5'; Menzies 40'; Moore 54'; Goals: 4 Ridge 6', pen 18', 40' (3/3); Innes 56' (1/1); Field goals: 0 Ridge (0/2)	1st: 14–2; 2nd: 6–6	Tries: 1 Zisti 61'; Goals: 2 Bartrim pen 37', 62' (2/2)

Sydney Football Stadium, Sydney
Attendance: 40,985
Referee: David Manson
Touch judges: Phil Cooley, Col White
In-goal judges: Brett Matthews, Barry Ruttle
Clive Churchill Medal: Geoff Toovey (Manly)

=== Other matches ===
Cronulla-Sutherland Sharks won the reserve grade Grand Final 14–12 against the Auckland Warriors. The Sharks led 6–0 at half time and maintained their lead in the second half with Geoff Bell scoring two tries. The win was Cronulla coach Stuart Raper fourth grand final victory after leading the Sharks to the Presidents Cup premiership in 1994.

In the under-21s Presidents Cup Grand Final, the South Queensland Crushers won their first ever title defeating the Parramatta Eels 24–12.

== Player statistics ==
The following statistics are as of the conclusion of Round 22.

Top 5 point scorers

Points	Player	Tries	Goals	Field Goals
225	Jason Taylor	5	102	1
168	Ivan Cleary	4	76	0
162	Ryan Girdler	8	65	0
160	Rod Wishart	14	52	0
153	Matthew Ridge	7	62	1

Top 5 try scorers

Tries	Player
21	Noa Nadruku
19	Steve Renouf
16	Steve Menzies
15	Ben Ikin
14	Darren Smith
14	Brett Dallas
14	Rod Wishart

Top 5 goal scorers

Goals	Player
102	Jason Taylor
76	Ivan Cleary
65	Ryan Girdler
64	Andrew Johns
62	Matthew Ridge
