= Brunke =

Brunke is a German surname. Notable people with the surname include:

- Adalbert Brunke (1912–2013), German Evangelical-Lutheran prelate
- Hans Brunke (1904–1985), German footballer
- Timo Brunke (born 1972), German poet

== See also ==
- Brunker
