= Michael Brunker =

Michael Brunker may refer to:

- Michael Brunker (journalist)
- Michael Brunker (politician)
