= Brunker =

Brunker is a surname. Notable people with the surname include:

- Adrian Brunker (born 1970), Australian rugby league player
- Amanda Brunker (born 1974), Irish writer and journalist
- James Brunker (1832–1910), Australian politician
- James Robert Brunker (1806–1869), British Army general
- Joel Brunker (born 1986), Australian boxer
- Hazel Brunker (born 1932), Welsh chess master
- Michael Brunker (journalist), American journalist
- Michael Brunker (politician)
- Richard Brunker, English politician
