= Dean Raper =

Australian rugby league footballer

Personal information
- Full name: Dean Raper
- Born: 20 April 1976 (age 48)

Playing information
- Position: Fullback
Club
Years	Team	Pld	T	G	FG	P
1996–98	St. George Dragons	29	3	0	0	12

Dean Raper (born 20 April 1976) is an Australian former rugby league footballer who played in the 1990s.

== Playing career ==
Raper made his first grade debut for St. George in round 8 1996 against Manly-Warringah at Kogarah Oval. Raper scored a try for St. George in their 1996 preliminary final victory over North Sydney.

He played fullback for St. George in the 1996 Grand Final loss to Manly-Warringah at the Sydney Football Stadium.

He retired after the joint venture of St. George and the Illawarra Steelers in 1999.
