= 1999 Parramatta Eels season =

- NRL Rank: 2nd
- Play-off result: Preliminary Finalists (Lost 16–18 vs Melbourne Storm, 1st Preliminary Final)
- 1999 record: Wins: 17; draws: 0; losses: 7
- Points scored: For: 500; against: 294

Team information
- CEO: Denis Fitzgerald
- Coach: (Australia) Brian Smith
- Captain: (New Zealand) Jarrod McCracken (Australia) Dean Pay
- Stadium: Parramatta Stadium (Capacity: 20,741)

Top scorers
- Tries: (Australia) Clinton Schifcofske (10) (Australia) Jason Smith
- Goals: (Australia) Clinton Schifcofske (64)
- Points: (Australia) Clinton Schifcofske (164)
← 1998	List of seasons	2000 →

The 1999 Parramatta Eels season was the 53rd in the club's history. Coached by Brian Smith and captained by Jarrod McCracken and Nathan Cayless, they competed in the National Rugby League's 1999 Telstra Premiership.

== Summary ==
Parramatta continued their success and consistency into the second year of the new National Rugby League, finishing two points behind Minor Premiers Cronulla. Parramatta kicked off their finals series with a comfortable 30–16 win against Newcastle at Parramatta Stadium.

However Parramatta could not back up that performance against Melbourne, after having a week off. Similar to the 1998 preliminary final loss to Canterbury, Parramatta lead the match 16-0 early before going into the half-time break winning 16-6. In the second half, Parramatta had chances to book their place in the grand final which included Jason Smith knocking the ball on with two players unmarked on his left hand side. This followed on from the first half where Dennis Moran knocked the ball on over the line where he was unmarked. In the end it was Melbourne who would come back to win 18-16 at the Sydney Football Stadium in an upset victory.

== Standings ==
1999 NRL season
Pos	Team	Pld	W	D	L	B	PF	PA	PD	Pts
1	Cronulla-Sutherland Sharks	24	18	0	6	2	586	332	+254	40
2	Parramatta Eels	24	17	0	7	2	500	294	+206	38
3	Melbourne Storm (P)	24	16	0	8	2	639	392	+247	36
4	Sydney City Roosters	24	16	0	8	2	592	377	+215	36
5	Canterbury-Bankstown Bulldogs	24	15	1	8	2	520	462	+58	35
6	St. George Illawarra Dragons	24	15	0	9	2	588	416	+172	34
7	Newcastle Knights	24	14	1	9	2	575	484	+91	33
8	Brisbane Broncos	24	13	2	9	2	510	368	+142	32
9	Canberra Raiders	24	13	1	10	2	618	439	+179	31
10	Penrith Panthers	24	11	1	12	2	492	428	+64	27
11	Auckland Warriors	24	10	0	14	2	538	498	+40	24
12	South Sydney Rabbitohs	24	10	0	14	2	349	556	-207	24
13	Manly Warringah Sea Eagles	24	9	1	14	2	454	623	-169	23
14	North Sydney Bears	24	8	0	16	2	490	642	-152	20
15	Balmain Tigers	24	8	0	16	2	345	636	-291	20
16	North Queensland Cowboys	24	4	1	19	2	398	588	-190	13
17	Western Suburbs Magpies	24	3	0	21	2	285	944	-659	10

== Awards ==
- Michael Cronin clubman of the year award: David Penna
- Ken Thornett Medal (Players' player): Michael Vella
- Jack Gibson Award (Coach's award): David Kidwell
- Eric Grothe Rookie of the Year Award: Luke Burt
