= Ray Blacklock =

Australian rugby league footballer (1955–2020)

Ray (Razor) Blacklock
Personal information
- Full name: Raymond Patrick Blacklock
- Born: 6 April 1955 Oberon, New South Wales, Australia
- Died: 28 October 2020 (aged 65) Cranebrook, New South Wales, Australia

Playing information
- Position: Wing
Club
Years	Team	Pld	T	G	FG	P
1976–80	Penrith Panthers	26	13	0	0	39
1981–82	Newtown Jets	31	13	0	0	39
1983–84	Canberra Raiders	30	2	0	0	8
	Total	87	28	0	0	86
- Source: Whiticker/Hudson
- Relatives: Nathan Blacklock (nephew)

Raymond Patrick Blacklock (6 April 1955 – 28 October 2020) was an Australian rugby league footballer who played in the 1970s and 1980s.

== Playing career ==
He started his career at the Penrith Panthers, making first grade in 1976. Blacklock played four seasons at Penrith between 1976 and 1980 and captained the Panthers' Under-23s side that won the premiership in 1978.

He then switched to the Newtown Jets for two seasons between 1981 and 1982. Blacklock played wing in the 1981 Grand Final team that were defeated by the Parramatta Eels.

He moved to Canberra Raiders for his final two seasons (1983–1984) before retiring. Blacklock was the paternal uncle of St George-Illawarra Dragons legend, Nathan Blacklock

Blacklock died on 28 October 2020, aged 65, after a five-year battle with multiple system atrophy.
