= 1999 Brisbane Broncos season =

Coordinates: 27.558333°S 153.062222°E

Seasons
- 1998 2000

The 1999 Brisbane Broncos season was the twelfth in the club's history. Coached by Wayne Bennett and captained by Allan Langer then Kevin Walters, they competed in the NRL's 1999 premiership, finishing the regular season 8th (out of 17) and reaching the finals but losing their first play-off match.

== Season summary ==
1999 saw the departure of one of Brisbane's favourite sons, Allan "Alfie" Langer, after the Broncos had a shocking start to the season, losing 8 of the first 10 matches. The captaincy was passed onto Langer's partner in the halves, Kevin Walters part way through the season.

Under Walters' captaincy the club made a remarkable turnaround mid-season, winning 11 consecutive games to qualify for the finals in eighth position. However they were then easily disposed of 42-20 by the Cronulla-Sutherland Sharks in week one of the finals series at Toyota Park.

== Match results ==
Round	Opponent	Result	Bro.	Opp.	Date	Venue	Crowd	Position
1	Canberra Raiders	Loss	20	28	5 Mar	Bruce Stadium	20,122	11/17
2	Cronulla-Sutherland Sharks	Loss	6	14	14 Mar	ANZ Stadium	16,460	15/17
3	Melbourne Storm	Loss	6	48	21 Mar	ANZ Stadium	17,836	16/17
4	Cronulla-Sutherland Sharks	Loss	18	20	27 Mar	Endeavour Field	17,165	16/17
5	Canterbury Bulldogs	Loss	16	20	2 Apr	Stadium Australia	30,360	16/17
6	South Sydney Rabbitohs	Win	30	10	11 Apr	ANZ Stadium	15,298	15/7
7	Newcastle Knights	Loss	18	19	18 Apr	Marathon Stadium	21,190	16/17
8	North Queensland Cowboys	Draw	20	20	25 Apr	Malanda Stadium	30,302	16/17
9	Melbourne Storm	Loss	18	28	2 May	Olympic Park	16,473	17/17
10	Sydney City Roosters	Loss	16	26	9 May	ANZ Stadium	29,373	17/17
11	Balmain Tigers	Win	12	10	16 May	Leichhardt Oval	13,236	17/17
12	Bye							17/17
13*	Western Suburbs Magpies	Win	50	0	29 May	ANZ Stadium	8,751	13/17
14	Penrith Panthers	Win	28	0	5 June	ANZ Stadium	9,790	13/17
15*	North Sydney Bears	Win	26	8	14 Jun	North Sydney Oval	13,442	13/17
16	Bye							13/17
17*	Penrith Panthers	Win	19	6	26 Jun	Penrith Football Stadium	10,200	11/17
18	Balmain Tigers	Win	42	10	4 Jul	ANZ Stadium	17,538	11/17
19	Auckland Warriors	Win	24	16	10 Jul	ANZ Stadium	14,941	10/17
20	South Sydney Rabbitohs	Win	22	8	17 Jul	Sydney Football Stadium	19,426	9/17
21	St George Illawarra Dragons	Win	22	4	23 Jul	ANZ Stadium	33,289	8/17
22	Newcastle Knights	Win	38	6	30 Jul	ANZ Stadium	29,979	8/17
23	Sydney City Roosters	Win	9	8	6 Aug	Sydney Football Stadium	15,416	8/17
24	Manly-Warringah Sea Eagles	Draw	26	26	15 Aug	Brookvale Oval	15,687	8/17
25	Parramatta Eels	Loss	10	21	20 Aug	ANZ Stadium	45,257	8/17
26	Canterbury Bulldogs	Win	14	12	27 Aug	ANZ Stadium	34,644	8/17
Qualif. Final	Cronulla-Sutherland Sharks	Loss	20	42	5 Sep	Endeavour Field	13,713	

- Game following a State of Origin match

== Ladder ==
1999 NRL season
Pos	Team	Pld	W	D	L	B	PF	PA	PD	Pts
1	Cronulla-Sutherland Sharks	24	18	0	6	2	586	332	+254	40
2	Parramatta Eels	24	17	0	7	2	500	294	+206	38
3	Melbourne Storm (P)	24	16	0	8	2	639	392	+247	36
4	Sydney City Roosters	24	16	0	8	2	592	377	+215	36
5	Canterbury-Bankstown Bulldogs	24	15	1	8	2	520	462	+58	35
6	St. George Illawarra Dragons	24	15	0	9	2	588	416	+172	34
7	Newcastle Knights	24	14	1	9	2	575	484	+91	33
8	Brisbane Broncos	24	13	2	9	2	510	368	+142	32
9	Canberra Raiders	24	13	1	10	2	618	439	+179	31
10	Penrith Panthers	24	11	1	12	2	492	428	+64	27
11	Auckland Warriors	24	10	0	14	2	538	498	+40	24
12	South Sydney Rabbitohs	24	10	0	14	2	349	556	-207	24
13	Manly Warringah Sea Eagles	24	9	1	14	2	454	623	-169	23
14	North Sydney Bears	24	8	0	16	2	490	642	-152	20
15	Balmain Tigers	24	8	0	16	2	345	636	-291	20
16	North Queensland Cowboys	24	4	1	19	2	398	588	-190	13
17	Western Suburbs Magpies	24	3	0	21	2	285	944	-659	10

== Scorers ==
Player	Tries	Goals	FG	Points
Ben Walker	7	61/81	0	150
Darren Lockyer	6	17/22	2	60
Michael De Vere	9	4	0	44
Tonie Carroll	8	0	0	32
Michael Hancock	8	0	0	32
Gorden Tallis	7	0	0	28
Steve Renouf	16	0	0	24
Wendell Sailor	6	0	0	24
Luke Priddis	5	0	0	20
Brad Thorn	5	0	0	20
Shaun Berrigan	4	0	0	16
Chris Walker	4	0	0	16
Shane Walker	4	0	0	16
Peter Ryan	3	0	0	12
Phillip Lee	2	0	0	8
Lote Tuqiri	2	0	0	8
Kevin Campion	1	0	0	4
Allan Langer	1	0	0	4
John Plath	1	0	0	4
Shane Webcke	1	0	0	4
Kevin Walters	1	0	0	4

== Honours ==
=== League ===
- Nil

=== Club ===
- Player of the year: Gorden Tallis
- Rookie of the year: Lote Tuqiri
- Back of the year: Wendell Sailor
- Forward of the year: Gorden Tallis
- Club man of the year: John Plath
