= Warren Carney =

Australian rugby league footballer

Personal information
- Born: 8 April 1978 (age 46); Australia

Playing information
- Position: Hooker
Club
Years	Team	Pld	T	G	FG	P
1999	St. George Illawarra	1	0	0	0	0
2001	Wests Tigers	3	0	0	0	0
	Total	4	0	0	0	0
- Source: As of 8 January 2020

Warren Carney is a former professional rugby league footballer who played in the 1990s and 2000s for the St. George Illawarra Dragons and Wests Tigers.

== Playing career ==
Carney made his first grade debut for St. George Illawarra in round 23 of the 1999 NRL season against the Auckland Warriors at Mt. Smart Stadium.

In the 2001 NRL season, he joined the Wests Tigers. He played three games for Wests. His final game for the club was a 44–10 loss against the Brisbane Broncos in round 17 at Campbelltown Stadium.
