= Hans Brunke =

German footballer

Personal information
- Date of birth: 1 October 1904
- Date of death: 6 March 1985 (aged 80)
- Position: Defender

Senior career*
Years	Team	Apps	(Gls)
- Tennis Borussia Berlin

International career
1927–1931	Germany	7	(0)
- * Club domestic league appearances and goals

Hans Brunke (1 October 1904 – 6 March 1985) was a German international footballer.
