= Darren Burns (rugby league) =

Australian rugby league footballer

Personal information
- Full name: Darren Burns
- Born: 17 May 1974 (age 52) Dalby, Queensland, Australia

Playing information
- Height: 1.86 m (6 ft 1 in)
- Weight: 104 kg (16 st 5 lb)
- Position: Second-row, Lock, Centre
Club
Years	Team	Pld	T	G	FG	P
1995–96	Western Suburbs	12	1	0	0	4
1997–98	South Sydney	41	6	0	0	24
1999–00	Sydney Roosters	22	4	0	0	16
2001	Brisbane Broncos	19	0	0	0	0
2002–04	Warrington Wolves	72	19	0	0	76
	Total	166	30	0	0	120

Darren Burns (born 17 May 1974) is an Australian former rugby league footballer who played as a lock for the Western Suburbs Magpies, South Sydney Rabbitohs, Sydney Roosters and the Brisbane Broncos over his seven-year career in the Australian National Rugby League competition.

== Background ==
Burns was born in Dalby, Queensland, and played his junior rugby league for the Dalby Devils.

== Playing career ==
He is best remembered for scoring the first NRL try in 1998, and his part in helping Warrington Wolves escape relegation in 2002, and in particular his performance in the 29–14 victory over Castleford Tigers at Wilderspool.
