= Lee Murphy =

Australian rugby league footballer

Personal information
- Full name: Lee Murphy
- Born: 7 January 1977 (age 49) Sydney, New South Wales, Australia

Playing information
- Height: 180 cm (5 ft 11 in)
- Weight: 93 kg (14 st 9 lb)
- Position: Fullback
Club
Years	Team	Pld	T	G	FG	P
1997–98	St George Dragons	34	13	13	0	78
1999–00	St. George Illawarra	20	2	0	0	8
2001	Wests Tigers	9	2	0	0	8
	Total	63	17	13	0	94

Lee Murphy (born 7 January 1977) is an Australian former professional rugby league footballer who played in the 1990s and 2000s. Murphy played for the St George Dragons, St George Illawarra Dragons and Wests Tigers.

== Early life ==
Murphy was a student of Marist College Kogarah, and played his junior football there.

== Playing career ==
Murphy made his first grade debut in round 4 1997 against the Gold Coast and scored a try in the 18–12 victory. Murphy played in the club's final ever game as a stand-alone entity, which was a 20–12 loss against Canterbury in the 1998 finals series. Murphy then signed on with St. George as they formed a joint venture with Illawarra to form St. George Illawarra and played in the club's first game against Parramatta.

Murphy joined the Wests Tigers in 2001 and retired at the conclusion of that season.
