= Michael Brunker (journalist) =

American journalist

Michael Brunker is an American journalist.

He started with msnbc.com as one of its first employees, in August 1996 as an investigator on Internet stories and was responsible for producing the series Internet Underground and Internet Roulette. After 8 years he changed to become the site's West Coast news editor and in March 2006 he moved to leading the site's team of investigative journalists.

With a degree in journalism from San Francisco State University, prior to joining msnbc.com Brunker worked for many years in newspapers including the San Francisco Examiner.

He specialized in Internet stories and coverage, producing MSNBC's popular "Internet Underground" series, focusing on online crime, which included interviews with wanted hackers. Along with Bob Sullivan, he received the 2002 Sigma Delta Chi national public service award for his series on internet auctions.
