= Chris Leikvoll =

Australian rugby league footballer

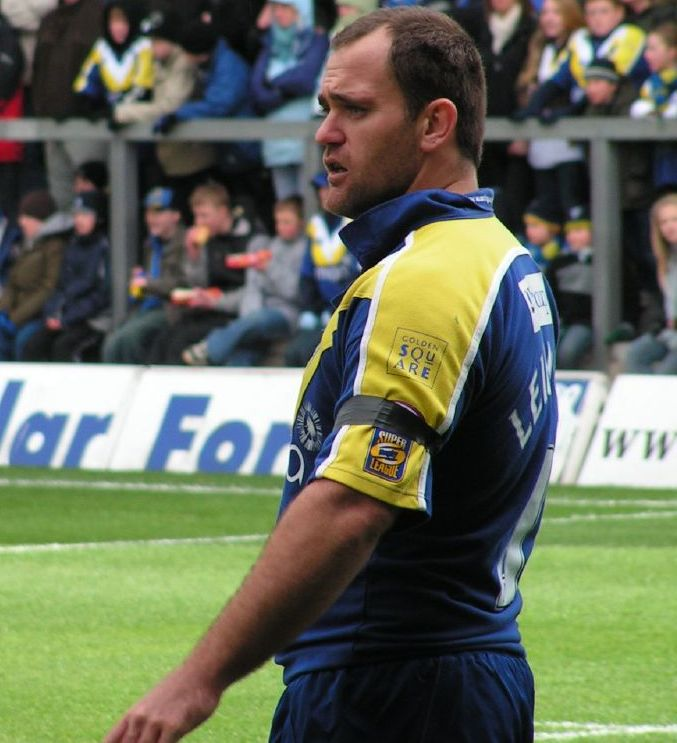

Personal information
- Full name: Christopher Leikvoll
- Born: 4 December 1975 (age 50) Sydney, New South Wales, Australia

Playing information
- Height: 190 cm (6 ft 3 in)
- Weight: 121 kg (19 st 1 lb)
- Position: Prop
Club
Years	Team	Pld	T	G	FG	P
1997–98	Illawarra Steelers	24	1	0	0	4
1999–03	St George Illawarra	91	2	0	0	8
2004–07	Warrington Wolves	94	4	0	0	16
	Total	209	7	0	0	28

Chris Leikvoll (/laɪkvɒl/) (born 4 December 1975) is an Australian former professional rugby league footballer who played in the 1990s and 2000s.

== Background ==
Leikvoll was born in Australia to immigrant British parents. Leikvoll's surname comes from his Norwegian grandfather.

== Playing career ==
Leikvoll made his debut for Illawarra in round 12 1997 against South Sydney which ended in a 28–28 draw. Leikvoll played in the club's final ever game as a stand-alone entity which was a 25–24 loss to Canterbury.

Leikvoll played as a prop in the St George Illawarra Dragons side that made the 1999 NRL Grand Final against the Melbourne Storm. It was the joint venture's first season in the premiership.

Leikvoll signed with the Warrington Wolves from St George Illawarra Dragons in 2004 until November 2006. Leikvoll has a British passport, so he did not count on the overseas quota.
