= Adrian Brunker =

Australian rugby league footballer

Personal information
- Full name: Adrian Brunker
- Born: 23 September 1970 (age 55)

Playing information
- Position: Fullback, Wing, Centre
Club
Years	Team	Pld	T	G	FG	P
1990–93	Newcastle Knights	57	18	36	0	144
1994–95	Gold Coast	22	3	2	0	16
1996–98	St George	52	25	0	0	100
1999	Wakefield Trinity Wildcats	17	6	0	0	24
	Total	148	52	38	0	284
Representative
Years	Team	Pld	T	G	FG	P
1992–93	Queensland	3	0	1	0	2

Adrian Brunker (born 23 September 1970) is an Australian former professional rugby league footballer who played in the 1990s. He played at representative level for Queensland, and at club level for Newcastle Knights, Gold Coast Seagulls, St George Dragons and Wakefield Trinity Wildcats, as a fullback, wing, centre.

== Playing career ==
Brunker made his first grade debut for Newcastle in round 4 of the 1990 NSWRL season against Penrith in a 6–6 draw. Brunker went on to play for Newcastle in the club's first finals appearance in 1992.

In 1994, Brunker joined the Gold Coast and spent 2 years at the club as they finished near the bottom of the table in both seasons.

In 1996, Brunker joined St George and played in the 1996 ARL Grand Final against Manly-Warringah which St George lost 20–8. Brunker played in St. George's final game before they formed a joint venture with the Illawarra Steelers to become St. George Illawarra. A semi-final loss to Canterbury-Bankstown at Kogarah Oval.

In 1999, Brunker joined English side Wakefield Trinity and played one season with them before retiring.
