= Wayne Bartrim =

Australia international rugby league footballer

Personal information
- Full name: Wayne Bartrim
- Born: 9 October 1971 (age 53); Hat Head, New South Wales, Australia

Playing information
- Height: 179 cm (5 ft 10 in)
- Weight: 92 kg (14 st 7 lb; 203 lb)
- Position: Lock, Hooker
Club
Years	Team	Pld	T	G	FG	P
1991–94	Gold Coast	76	18	76	0	224
1995–98	St. George Dragons	83	19	242	0	560
1999–01	St George Illawarra	72	8	171	0	374
2002–03	Castleford	48	9	171	0	378
	Total	279	54	660	0	1536
Representative
Years	Team	Pld	T	G	FG	P
1995–98	Queensland	9	0	11	0	22
1995–96	Australia	4	3	0	0	12

Wayne Bartrim (born 9 October 1971), is an Australian former professional rugby league footballer who played in the 1990s and 2000s. He was selected to represent Australia and Queensland during his career, which he spent playing for the Gold Coast Seagulls, St. George Dragons and the St. George Illawarra Dragons in Australia and the Castleford Tigers (Heritage No. 785) in England. Bartrim primarily played his club career as a lock, but played his representative career as a hooker.

== Background ==
Born in Hat Head, New South Wales on 9 October 1971, Bartrim played his junior football in Kempsey, New South Wales.

== Playing career ==
=== 1990s ===
Bartrim was graded with the Gold Coast Seagulls in 1992 and made 76 appearances for the club. By 1994 he'd become the club's highest point scorer with 224 points, and in a match that season against the Eastern Suburbs Roosters scored a club record of 20 points. He joined the St. George Dragons in 1995 and in his seven-year career with the club was the club's highest point scorer in seasons 1995, 1996, 1997, 1998 and 1999.

He was one of the senior players at the time of the merger with the Illawarra Steelers and captained the club on a number of occasions. Bartrim made his début for Queensland as a hooker in the Paul Vautin-coached 1995 State of Origin series side full of inexperienced unknowns, due to many Queensland regulars being declared unavailable due to the Super League war. His eligibility for Queensland was later questioned, though, with his only link to the state seemingly being his tenure at the Gold Coast Seagulls, who were at that time based in Tweed Heads, New South Wales anyway. Nonetheless, Bartrim kicked a penalty goal in Game I, which turned out to be the only points scored in Queensland's upset 2–0 victory. He stayed on as hooker and goal-kicker in all matches of Queensland shock 3-0 whitewash of that Origin series. Bartrim debuted for Australia in the first Test of the 1995 Trans-Tasman Test series against New Zealand at Suncorp Stadium, and appeared in two Tests of that series (won 3-0 by the Australians), scoring a try in the second game at the Sydney Football Stadium.

Injury forced him to miss the final game of the series and he was replaced by 1994 Kangaroos backup hooker Jim Serdaris. At the end of the 1995 ARL season Bartrim was in Australia's squad for the 1995 Rugby League World Cup played in England and made two appearances in games against England (at the famous Wembley Stadium in the opening game of the tournament, won 20-16 by the host nation). He also played in the Kangaroos 86–6 win over South Africa in Gateshead.

Bartrim was again Queensland's starting hooker in Game I of the 1996 State of Origin series but was kept out of the rest of that year's series by Steve Walters in the hooking role. He played in St. George's 1996 Grand Final loss to the Manly-Warringah Sea Eagles where he kicked two goals. Bartrim's 176 points scored in 1996 with St. George are the most ever scored by a lock in a New South Wales Rugby League season. Following the 1996 Grand Final, he also played from the bench in a Test against Papua New Guinea at the Lloyd Robson Oval in Port Moresby, scoring two tries. He returned for all three games of the 1997 series (when Super League-aligned players were again unavailable) and Games I and II of the 1998 series playing at Lock, Hooker, the second-row, or off the interchange bench. In total, he played nine games and kicked eleven goals in his Origin career. He played at lock forward for the St. George club in their 1999 NRL Grand Final loss to Melbourne.

=== 2000s ===
Bartrim left St. George at the end of the 2001 NRL season to play two years in England with the Castleford Tigers. He set the Castleford club's record for most goals in a season with 115 scored in 2002. Whilst at Castleford Tigers Bartrim proved an excellent signing. In 2002 he scored a vital try in a game against Salford to get the tigers into the playoffs. In 2003 Bartrim was injured for most of the season, ]. Bartrim left the club at the end of the 2003 season. At the end of 2003, Bartrim returned to Australia to settle in Hat Head and was the Macleay Valley Mustangs' captain-coach in the NSW Group 2 competition in 2004 and 2005. In 2006, he moved to Brisbane and played with the Noosa Pirates in the Sunshine Coast Rugby League competition in 2006 and 2007. He is married and has 4 children.

== Sources ==
- Andrews, Malcolm (2006) The ABC of Rugby League Austn Broadcasting Corpn, Sydney
- Big League's 25 Years of Origin, (2005 Collectors Edition), News Magazines, Surry Hills, Sydney
- Whiticker, Alan; Hudson, Glen (2007). The Encyclopedia of Rugby League Players. Wetherill Park, New South Wales: Gary Allen Pty Ltd. p. 609. ISBN 978-1-877082-93-1.
