= Colin Ward (rugby league) =

Australian rugby league footballer

Personal information
- Full name: Colin Ward
- Born: 4 January 1971 (age 54); Sydney, New South Wales, Australia

Playing information
- Height: 192 cm (6 ft 4 in)
- Weight: 110 kg (17 st 5 lb)
- Position: Prop
Club
Years	Team	Pld	T	G	FG	P
1991–94	Eastern Suburbs	34	4	0	0	16
1995	Gold Coast	13	0	0	0	0
1996–98	St George	69	6	0	0	24
1999–01	St George Illawarra	53	3	0	0	12
2002–03	Penrith Panthers	31	2	0	0	8
	Total	200	15	0	0	60
Representative
Years	Team	Pld	T	G	FG	P
2001	NSW City	1	0	0	0	0

Colin Ward (born 4 January 1971) is an Australian former professional rugby league footballer who played in the 1990s and 2000s.

== Playing career ==
Ward played for Eastern Suburbs, Gold Coast, St. George Dragons, St. George Illawarra Dragons and the Penrith Panthers in the NRL. Ward also represented New South Wales City in 2001.

Ward played for St. George from the interchange bench in their 1996 ARL Grand Final loss to Manly-Warringah at the Sydney Football Stadium. Ward played in St. George's final game before they formed a joint venture with the Illawarra Steelers to become St. George Illawarra, where he became somewhat of a crowd favourite and cult hero. A semi-final loss to Canterbury-Bankstown at Kogarah Oval.

Ward played for St. George Illawarra in their 1999 NRL Grand Final loss to the Melbourne Storm at Stadium Australia. In 2002, Ward joined Penrith. He was part of the Penrith side that travelled to England to face Super League VIII champions, Bradford in the 2004 World Club Challenge. He played from the interchange bench in the Penrith's 22–4 loss.
