= Nathan Blacklock =

Australia international rugby league footballer

Personal information
- Full name: Nathan Blacklock
- Born: 4 April 1976 (age 50) Tingha, New South Wales, Australia

Playing information
- Height: 183 cm (6 ft 0 in)
- Weight: 83 kg (13 st 1 lb)

Rugby league
- Position: Wing
Club
Years	Team	Pld	T	G	FG	P
1995	Sydney Roosters	5	1	0	0	4
1997–98	St George Dragons	23	20	0	0	80
1999–04	St George Illawarra	114	100	14	0	428
2005–06	Hull F.C.	51	35	0	0	140
	Total	193	156	14	0	652
Representative
Years	Team	Pld	T	G	FG	P
2001–04	Country NSW	2	1	0	0	4
2001	Australia	2	2	2	0	12

Rugby union
- Position: Wing
Club
Years	Team	Pld	T	G	FG	P
2003	New South Wales	5	2	0	0	10
- Relatives: Ray Blacklock (uncle); Preston Campbell (cousin); Bevan French (nephew)

Nathan Blacklock (born 4 April 1976) is an Australian former professional rugby league and, briefly, rugby union footballer who played in the 1990s and 2000s. An Australia national rugby league representative wing, he played for the Sydney City Roosters and the St. George Dragons before they formed a joint-venture with the Illawarra Steelers to form the St. George Illawarra Dragons, with whom he continued playing, becoming the National Rugby League's top try-scorer for three consecutive seasons from 1999 to 2001. Blacklock also played in the Super League for Hull FC, with whom he won the 2005 Challenge Cup.

== Background ==
Born in Tingha, New South Wales, Blacklock went on to gain the nickname, Tingha Tornado.

== Playing career ==
=== 1990s ===
Blacklock began his professional career in 1995 at the Sydney City Roosters, before moving to St. George where he played between 1997 and 1998. In 1998, playing for the St. George, he scored 20 tries from 22 games, the second highest in the competition that year. From 1999 to 2002, he played for the newly formed joint-venture St. George Illawarra. He played on the wing for the club in their 1999 NRL Grand Final loss to Melbourne.

In 1999, Blacklock scored 24 tries from 24 matches, the highest that year. Blacklock was the top try scorer in the Australian National Rugby League competition for three consecutive seasons whilst playing for St. George Illawarra between 1999 and 2001. It was the first time since the 1920s in Australian rugby league that a player had topped the try scoring list for three consecutive seasons. Blacklock was the first ever player to score 20 or more tries in four consecutive seasons.

=== 2000s ===
In 2000 Blacklock scored 25 tries from 26 matches. In 2001 he scored an incredible 27 tries from 28 matches, thereby completing his treble as top try scorer. At the end of the 2001 NRL season, Blacklock went on the 2001 Kangaroo tour. Blacklock was first selected for the Australian team in 2001, scoring two tries in Australia's 54–12 win over Papua New Guinea. He played one further Test, the Third Test against Great Britain at Wigan in 2001. Blacklock was controversially omitted from the NSW Blues 2001 State of Origin team despite being the stand out winger of the competition. State selectors claimed that Blacklock's omission was necessary due to his small size and possible deficiencies in defence, because he would have to mark up against larger wingers such as Wendell Sailor or Lote Tuqiri. Ironically the NSW Blues lost the series 2-1 and were humiliated in game 3 at AAMI Stadium by 40–14, where QLD wingers Lote Tuqiri and Wendell Sailor, as well as QLD centre Chris Walker ran riot over the selected NSW wingers Adam MacDougall and Jamie Ainscough, Ainscough coincidentally Blacklock's Dragons wing partner.

During the 2002 NRL season Blacklock was granted a release from his contract with St. George in order to play rugby union. Some speculate that this move was motivated by the disappointment Blacklock felt after not being selected for State of Origin, despite being the leading try scorer three years running. After a short stint playing rugby union with the New South Wales Waratahs, Blacklock returned to the St. George club during the latter half of the 2003 NRL season, where he again proved his worth by scoring 14 tries in 12 games. 2004 was an average year for Blacklock, where injuries kept him off the field for long periods of time. Blacklock returned to help St. George Illawarra at the end of the year, which included scoring crucial tries in the club's round 25 come from behind win against Manly, as well as their narrow loss to Penrith during the first week of the finals.

From 1997 to 2004, Nathan Blacklock played 137 first grade games for the club, scoring 120 tries and 14 goals for a total of 508 points, giving Blacklock one of the best try scoring strike rates of any Rugby League player. In his entire playing career from 1995 to 2004, Blacklock played 142 career first grade games. During that time he scored 121 tries and kicked 14 goals for a total of 512 points.

At the end of 2004, Nathan Blacklock left the NRL in order to play in the Super League for English team Hull F.C. In his first season with Hull F.C. he scored 22-tries in all competitions, including a hat-trick away to the Huddersfield Giants and at home to the Leigh Centurions. He played for Hull F.C. on the wing in the 2005 Challenge Cup Final victory against the Leeds Rhinos. In August 2006, it was announced that Blacklock would have to retire from all forms of football due to a chronic knee injury. Blacklock had been planning to retire from the game at the end of the season but when the extent of his injury was discovered, the club decided to release Blacklock from his contract as he was no longer able to play. After his retirement was announced, Blacklock came out and stated, "I'm disappointed I've had to call it a day, but I simply can't give the 100% I want to anymore because of injuries. I can't put my heart and soul into playing. Everyone at the club has been great to me and I wish the team all the best for the play-offs and the future." At the time of the news, Hull F.C. were sitting second on the Super League table and were a real chance to reach the Grand Final at Old Trafford for the first time in the Super League era. Hull F.C. coach Peter Sharp added that "'Tingha' has enjoyed a marvellous career, he has achieved some things in rugby league that most people can only dream about.

In 2009, Blacklock played two games for the Tuggeranong Vikings. Blacklock also played for the Muswellbrook Rams in the group 21 league.
