= Darren Treacy (rugby league) =

Australian rugby league footballer

Personal information
- Full name: Darren Treacy
- Born: 26 June 1971 (age 54) Newcastle, New South Wales, Australia

Playing information
- Height: 188 cm (6 ft 2 in)
- Weight: 100 kg (15 st 10 lb)
- Position: Second-row, Prop
Club
Years	Team	Pld	T	G	FG	P
1994–96	Newcastle Knights	61	15	0	0	60
1997–98	St George	40	6	0	0	24
1999–01	St George Illawarra	66	12	0	0	48
2002	Salford	26	6	1	0	26
2003	Parramatta Eels	15	0	0	0	0
	Total	208	39	1	0	158
Representative
Years	Team	Pld	T	G	FG	P
1995	NSW Country	1	0	0	0	0

Darren Treacy (born 26 June 1971) is an Australian former professional rugby league footballer who played in the 1990s and 2000s. He played for the Newcastle Knights, St. George Dragons, St. George Illawarra Dragons and the Parramatta Eels.

== Playing career ==
Treacy made his first grade debut for Newcastle against South Sydney in Round 1 1994. In 1995, Treacy played in the club's finals series as they reached the preliminary final before being defeated by Manly-Warringah.

In 1997, Treacy joined St George and in 1998 played in the club's final ever game as a stand-alone entity which was a 20–12 loss to Canterbury in the 1998 finals series.

In 1999, St George announced a joint venture with Illawarra to form St George Illawarra. Treacy played in the club inaugural game against Parramatta. Treacy then played for the club at second-row forward in their 1999 NRL Grand Final loss to the Melbourne Storm. Treacy then had a spell in England with the Salford City Reds in 2002.

In 2003, Treacy returned to Australia and played 1 season with Parramatta before retiring at the end of the season.
