= Corey Pearson =

Australian rugby league footballer

Personal information
- Full name: Corey Pearson
- Born: 9 January 1973 (age 53) New South Wales, Australia

Playing information
- Height: 182 cm (6 ft 0 in)
- Weight: 105 kg (16 st 7 lb)
- Position: Prop
Club
Years	Team	Pld	T	G	FG	P
1995–96	Balmain Tigers	25	1	0	0	4
1997–98	St. George Dragons	46	4	0	0	16
1999–00	St. George Illawarra	34	2	0	0	8
2001–03	Wests Tigers	55	4	0	0	16
2004	Parramatta Eels	13	0	0	0	0
	Total	173	11	0	0	44

Corey Pearson (born 9 January 1973) is an Australian former professional rugby league footballer who played in 1990 and 2000s. Pearson played for the Balmain Tigers, St. George Dragons, St. George Illawarra Dragons, Wests Tigers and the Parramatta Eels. He primarily played as a Prop.

== Background ==
Corey Pearson was born in New South Wales, Australia.

== Playing career ==
Pearson made his debut for Balmain in Round 12 1995 against South Queensland at a time when the club was briefly known as the "Sydney Tigers", a name that the club adopted during the Super League war.

In 1997, Pearson joined St George and played in the club's last ever game as a stand-alone entity which was a 20–12 loss against Canterbury in the 1998 finals series. In 1999, Pearson signed to play on with St George as they formed a joint venture with Illawarra. Pearson played in the club's inaugural game as a joint venture against Parramatta.

In 2001, Pearson joined the Wests Tigers and played with the club until the end of 2003. In 2004, Pearson joined Parramatta and retired at the end of the season with his last game being a 48–10 loss against the Sydney Roosters.
