= Jeff Hardy (rugby league) =

Australian rugby league footballer

Personal information
- Full name: Jeffrey Hardy
- Born: 20 May 1966 (age 60) Sydney, New South Wales, Australia

Playing information
- Height: 180 cm (5 ft 11 in)
- Weight: 96 kg (15 st 2 lb)
- Position: Back Row
Club
Years	Team	Pld	T	G	FG	P
1985–89	Illawarra Steelers	85	15	0	0	60
1989–90	Sheffield Eagles	45	7	0	0	28
1990–91	Castleford	51	14	0	0	56
1991–98	St. George Dragons	159	20	0	0	80
1999	Sheffield Eagles	26	7	0	0	28
2000	Huddersfield Giants	25	6	0	1	25
	Total	391	69	0	1	277

Jeffrey Hardy (born 20 May 1966) is an Indigenous Australian former professional rugby league footballer who played in the 1980s and 1990s.

== Playing career ==
Playing in the back row, Hardy represented the Illawarra Steelers between 1985 and 1989 and the St George Dragons from 1991 to 1998. A St. George junior from the Brighton Seagulls junior club, Hardy went on to play in two Grand Finals in 1992 and 1993 . Hardy played in a third grand-final loss with the St. George Dragons in 1996. Hardy was a favourite player with all Dragons fans during his period at the club. Hardy played in St. George's final game before they formed a joint venture with the Illawarra Steelers to become St. George Illawarra. A semi-final loss to Canterbury-Bankstown at Kogarah Oval.

Hardy also had a career in England playing for Sheffield Eagles (1989-1990 and 1999), Castleford (1990-1991) and the Huddersfield Giants (2000). He retired in 2001 after a long and successful club career. After retiring he went on to coach Endeavour Sports High School's Australian schoolboys rugby team.

== English County Cup Final appearances ==
Hardy played at second-row in Castleford's 11–8 victory over Wakefield Trinity in the 1990 Yorkshire Cup Final during the 1990–91 season at Elland Road, Leeds on Sunday 23 September 1990.

== Personal life ==
Hardy is an Indigenous Australian of Yuwaalaraay descent.
