= David Waite =

Former professional RL coach and Australia international rugby league footballer

Personal information
- Born: 30 May 1951 (age 75) Australia

Playing information
Club
Years	Team	Pld	T	G	FG	P
1970–73	Wests (Wollongong)
1974–75	Cronulla-Sutherland	20	3	0	0	27
1978	Western Suburbs	7	2	0	0	6
	Total	27	5	0	0	33
Representative
Years	Team	Pld	T	G	FG	P
1973	Country Firsts	6	0	0	0	0
1973–74	New South Wales	5	0	0	0	0
1973–74	Australia	6	0	0	0	0

Coaching information
Club
Years	Team	Gms	W	D	L	W%
1991–94	Newcastle Knights	76	34	2	40	45
1996–98	St. George Dragons	72	37	3	32	51
1999–00	St. George Illawarra	48	28	0	20	58
	Total	196	99	5	92	51
Representative
Years	Team	Gms	W	D	L	W%
2001–03	Great Britain	11	5	1	5	45

David Waite (born 30 May 1951) is an Australian former rugby league footballer and coach. He has also coached Great Britain in the Rugby League Tri-Nations.

== Background ==
Waite was born in New South Wales, Australia.

Waite holds a British passport, courtesy of his father being born in Leicester.

== Club career ==
Waite was a Canterbury-Bankstown Bulldogs junior and played with their President's Cup team in 1969. The following season he played with Wests Wollongong in the Illawarra Rugby League competition. It was whilst playing for Wests Wollongong that he first represented for Country, NSW and Australia. He spent two seasons with the Cronulla-Sutherland Sharks in 1974 and 1975. Injury forced him into premature retirement in 1976 but in 1978 he was coaxed to make a comeback by his former coach Warren Ryan and returned to the Western Suburbs Magpies for a few games in 1978 before retiring again and taking up coaching.

== Representative career ==
Waite was a Country and New South Wales representative in 1973 before being selected for international representation as a winger in 1973. He played in two Tests of the Ashes tour of Great Britain and two Tests against France. In 1974 he took part in two Tests in the Ashes series in Australia.

He scored three tries in the Kangaroos versus Rest of The World match in early 1974 but broke his jaw that season and missed the early representative games. He returned to the Test team for the opening match of the Ashes series but was dropped following Australia's 16-11 second Test loss. Waite is named in the Australian Players Register as Kangaroo No. 447.

== Coaching career ==
In 1984 he was appointed coach of the Australian Schoolboys team. A position as coach of Canterbury under 23s followed from 1985 to 1987 and he was then Newcastle reserve grade coach from 1988 to 1991.

Waite's first first-grade coaching job was for Newcastle, succeeding Allan McMahon in 1991. He joined St George in 1996 and went on to guide them to the 1996 Grand Final against great odds and again coached St. George to the 1999 Grand Final. To Waite's surprise, in May 2000 it was announced that he would not be retained as coach for 2001. Instead, the St. George Illawarra board favoured Waite's co-coach, Andrew Farrar for the position.

He was reportedly offered the job of New Zealand coach in 2000 but instead moved to Britain to work as a coaching co-ordinator in 2000 for the Rugby Football League.

In February 2001, he was appointed head coach and technical director of the Great Britain rugby league team. Waite stepped down from this role in 2003.

During 2006 he worked behind the scenes with the Catalans Dragons in their inaugural season in the Super League. He returned to Australia at the end of the 2006 season. In 1995 Waite coached South Australia in the National Championship
