= List of Illawarra Steelers players =

This is a list of rugby league footballers who have played first grade for the Illawarra Steelers. Players are listed in the order they made their debut.

== Players ==
Club
No.	Name	Career	Appearances	Tries	Goals	Field goals	Points
1	Martin Cavill	1982−1983	25	2	0	0	6
2	Greg Cook	1982−1983	19	1	0	0	3
3	John Dorahy	1982−1985	73	14	204	5	463
4	Rod Henniker	1982−1984	45	6	4	0	30
5	Brian Hetherington	1982−1988	144	25	0	0	98
6	Barry Jensen	1982	10	0	0	0	0
7	Mitchell Jones	1982	9	0	0	0	0
8	Shane McKellar	1982−1983	47	31	0	0	111
9	Chris Montgomery	1982	10	0	0	0	0
10	Lee Pomfret	1982−1983	31	12	0	0	42
11	Peter Ryan Jr.	1982−1983	30	1	0	0	3
12	John Sparks	1982−1984	42	16	0	0	51
13	Wayne Springall	1982−1983	37	2	0	0	7
14	Steve Topper	1982−1984	26	3	0	0	12
15	Craig Treneman	1982−1983	19	0	0	0	0
16	Michael Bolt	1982−1990	169	9	1	0	34
17	Terry Westblade	1982−1986	36	2	0	0	7
18	Mal Creevey	1982−1983	32	4	0	0	14
19	Peter Kirkland	1982−1983	17	7	7	0	35
20	Paul Thompson	1982−1983	33	6	0	1	24
21	Greg Cambridge	1982	1	0	0	0	0
22	Peter Fitzpatrick	1982	1	0	0	0	0
23	Graham Faux	1982	14	1	0	0	3
24	Keith Rugg	1982−1983	12	2	1	0	10
25	Gerald Crowe	1982	1	0	0	0	0
26	Phil McKenzie	1982−1983	10	1	0	0	4
27	Scott Greenland	1982−1986	44	1	0	0	4
28	Paul Harrod	1982	1	0	0	0	0
29	Russell Holdsworth	1982−1983	25	0	0	0	0
30	Paul Elliott	1982	4	0	0	0	0
31	Paul Bond	1982	1	0	0	0	0
32	Craig Purcell	1982−1983	7	0	0	0	0
33	Kendall Thurgate	1982−1983	9	2	0	0	8
34	Mark Broadhurst	1983	24	1	0	1	5
35	Craig Dimond	1983−1984, 1994	24	2	0	0	8
36	Darryl Duncan	1983	3	0	0	0	0
37	Alan McIndoe	1983−1988, 1991−1993	127	65	0	0	260
38	Peter Stanford	1983	4	0	0	0	0
39	Owen Saunders	1983−1987	47	17	0	0	68
40	David Banks	1983	4	0	0	0	0
41	Kim Patrick	1983−1985	28	8	0	0	32
42	Peter Webster	1983	2	0	0	0	0
43	Darryl Crosland	1983−1988	6	0	0	0	0
44	Stan Browne	1984−1986	44	6	0	0	24
45	Kevin Kelly	1984−1986	34	10	1	0	42
46	Wayne McPherson	1984−1986	33	8	56	0	144
47	David Moon	1984−1985, 1989−1991	65	16	9	0	82
48	Rod Reddy	1984−1985	34	1	0	0	4
49	Geoff Selby	1984−1985	40	9	0	0	36
50	Peter Smith	1984−1986	38	0	0	0	0
51	Robert Thompson	1984	14	3	0	0	12
52	Rex Williams	1984−1985	26	0	0	0	0
53	Ossie Welsh	1984	4	1	0	0	4
54	Steve Worthington	1984−1988	70	11	0	0	44
55	Greg Mackey	1984−1988	105	29	3	0	122
56	Michael Wicks	1984−1985	12	0	0	0	0
57	Paul Upfield	1984−1988	74	9	1	0	38
58	Jason Moon	1984−1985, 1989	33	7	0	0	28
59	Dale Thompson	1984	1	0	0	0	0
60	Phil Calder	1984−1987	10	0	0	0	0
61	Bruce Honeysett	1984	1	0	0	0	0
62	Michael Carberry	1985−1990	89	5	0	0	20
63	Sean O'Connor	1985−1987	16	1	0	0	4
64	Mick Pattison	1985−1986	43	4	0	0	16
65	Seamus O'Connell	1985−1986	20	2	0	0	8
66	Graeme Bradley	1985−1987	34	6	0	0	24
67	Jeff Hardy	1985−1989	87	15	0	0	60
68	Steve Larder	1985−1989	61	17	41	0	150
69	Tom Fowler	1985-2026	1	0	0	0	0
70	Gerry Clancy	1985	3	0	0	0	0
71	Trevor Kissell	1985−1993	72	9	0	0	36
72	Rick Posetti	1985	2	0	0	0	0
73	Grahame Buckley	1986	1	0	0	0	0
74	Max Mannix	1986−1988	16	0	0	0	0
75	Tony Armstrong	1986	6	2	16	0	40
76	Ken Daly	1986	1	0	0	0	0
77	Gary Hammond	1986	1	0	0	0	0
78	Malcolm Kelly	1986−1987	24	12	0	0	24
79	Ian Russell	1986−1994	115	14	0	0	56
80	Keith Cole	1986−1988	25	0	0	0	0
81	Peter Spring	1986−1988	29	2	0	0	8
82	Craig Madsen	1986	1	0	0	0	0
83	Chris Macklin-Shaw	1986−1987	12	4	22	0	60
84	Dean Carney	1987−1988	35	12	74	0	198
85	Perry Haddock	1987−1988	37	6	0	1	25
86	Peter Phillips	1987−1989, 1995	52	6	0	0	24
87	Chris Walsh	1987−1992	77	0	0	0	0
88	Chris Withall	1987	12	1	0	1	5
89	Dean Hanson	1987−1991	61	4	0	0	16
90	Ron Smith	1987	2	0	0	0	0
91	Cavill Heugh	1987−1989	48	7	4	0	36
92	Greg Carberry	1987−1990	25	6	46	0	116
93	Wayne Harvey	1987−1989	5	0	0	0	0
94	Darren Appleby	1987−1988	7	3	0	0	12
95	Danny Mason	1987	1	0	0	0	0
96	Tony Smith	1987−1991	40	9	0	0	36
97	Leo Epifania	1988	1	0	1	0	2
98	Glen Leggett	1988	9	7	0	0	28
99	Shane Leigh	1988	3	0	0	0	0
100	Glen Steele	1988	2	0	0	0	0
101	John Connolly	1988	4	0	0	0	0
102	Warren Lee	1988	9	0	0	0	0
103	Darren Strutt	1988	8	2	0	0	8
104	Craig Keen	1988−1991	28	0	0	0	0
105	James Mathews	1988−1991	22	2	17	0	42
106	Frazer Hammett	1989	10	2	0	0	8
107	Les Morrisey	1989−1992	34	6	0	0	24
108	Neil Piccinelli	1989−1996	145	28	21	0	154
109	Dean Schifilliti	1989−1993	102	16	0	0	64
110	Rod Wishart	1989−1998	154	68	386	0	1044
111	Martin Ebb	1989−1991	32	9	0	0	36
112	Craig Borg	1989	1	0	0	0	0
113	Michael Condon	1989	1	0	0	0	0
114	Wayne Everett	1989	1	0	0	0	0
115	Brett Rodwell	1989−1997	156	60	8	0	256
116	Andy Gregory	1989	9	3	0	0	12
117	Steve Hampson	1989	11	1	0	0	4
118	Len Barton	1989−1990	5	0	0	0	0
119	Dale Fritz	1989−1993	73	8	0	0	32
120	Phil Tiernan	1989−1991	22	0	0	0	0
121	Darren Currie	1990−1991	15	3	2	2	18
122	Doug Delaney	1990−1992	29	2	0	0	8
123	Brett Jones	1990−1991	23	0	0	0	0
124	Darryl Neville	1990	2	0	0	0	0
125	Craig Teitzel	1990−1993	50	3	0	0	12
126	David Riolo	1990−1996	90	18	0	1	73
127	John Simon	1990−1995	120	27	30	9	177
128	Paul Young	1990	1	0	0	0	0
129	Keith Beauchamp	1990−1991, 1994−1995	32	7	0	0	28
130	Mark Morley	1990	1	0	0	0	0
131	David Walsh	1990−1998	114	6	0	0	24
132	Paul McGregor	1991−1998	124	44	0	0	176
133	Brendan O'Meara	1991−1996	59	16	0	0	64
134	Bill Dunn	1991−1993	47	4	0	0	16
135	Dean Callaway	1991−1998	91	13	0	0	52
136	Gary Walsh	1991	3	0	0	0	0
137	John Cross	1991−1997	137	32	0	0	128
138	Ryan Girdler	1991−1992	23	8	44	0	118
139	David Wonson	1991−1993	5	0	0	0	0
140	Shane Wilson	1991−1992	7	0	0	0	0
141	Brett Docherty	1992	15	0	3	0	6
142	Craig Izzard	1992−1993	30	2	0	0	8
143	Dave Gallagher	1992	13	0	0	0	0
144	Andrew Pauls	1992−1993	7	1	0	0	4
145	Brett Goldspink	1992−1993	14	0	0	0	0
146	Aaron Whittaker	1992	2	0	0	0	0
147	Mick Neil	1992−1993	23	2	0	0	8
148	Craig Simon	1992−1996, 1998	73	15	0	0	60
149	Jonathan Britten	1992−1998	55	18	0	0	72
150	Steve Waddell	1992−1994	40	0	0	0	0
151	Jody Rudd	1992−1994	15	1	0	0	4
152	Grant Izzard	1993	10	1	0	0	4
153	Bob Lindner	1993	20	4	0	0	16
154	Nigel Roy	1993−1994	27	10	0	0	40
155	Dean Jones	1993	1	0	0	0	0
156	Shaun Walliss	1993	5	0	0	0	0
157	Greg Clarke	1993−1994	4	0	0	0	0
158	Cameron Eaton	1993	1	0	0	0	0
159	Ben Duckworth	1993−1995	12	1	0	0	4
160	Andrew Farrar	1994	22	3	0	0	12
161	Peter Johnston	1994−1995	31	4	0	0	16
162	Greg Keenan	1994	5	1	6	0	16
163	Joe Thomas	1994	6	1	0	0	4
164	Barry Ward	1994	12	1	0	0	4
165	Darren Fritz	1994−1996	59	5	0	0	20
166	Brett Cox	1994	4	0	0	0	0
167	Troy Herbert	1994	1	0	0	0	0
168	Glen Air	1994−1997	44	12	2	0	52
169	Craig Patch	1994	1	0	0	0	0
170	Mark Taylor	1994	3	1	5	0	14
171	Shaun Timmins	1994−1998	68	28	11	1	135
172	Anthony Bonus	1994−1995	4	0	0	0	0
173	Martin Masella	1995	10	2	0	0	8
174	Wayne Richards	1995−1996	41	2	0	0	8
175	Rex Terp	1995	3	1	0	0	4
176	Scott England	1995−1996	16	0	0	0	0
177	Sean Skelton	1995	4	2	0	0	8
178	Dean Moon	1995−1997	17	0	20	0	40
179	Hamish Smith	1995	1	0	0	0	0
180	Michael Cross	1995−1997	2	0	0	0	0
181	Michael Byron	1995	1	0	0	0	0
182	Adam Bristow	1996−1998	20	4	0	0	16
183	David Cox	1996−1997	12	1	0	0	4
184	Brad Hepi	1996	18	3	0	0	12
185	Fili Seru	1996−1997	20	4	0	0	16
186	Josh White	1996	14	2	0	0	8
187	Paul Carige	1996	16	1	0	0	4
188	Brad Mackay	1996−1998	56	8	5	0	42
189	Darrien Doherty	1996	20	1	0	0	4
190	Andrew Purcell	1996−1998	26	4	0	0	16
191	Kyle White	1996	9	1	0	0	4
192	Wayne Clifford	1996−1998	41	20	0	0	80
193	Brendon Reeves	1996−1998	45	11	9	0	62
194	Craig Smith	1996−1998	49	1	0	0	4
195	Maea David	1996−1997	11	0	0	0	0
196	Trent Barrett	1996−1998	45	30	0	2	122
197	Darren Bradstreet	1997−1998	31	3	15	0	42
198	Scott Cram	1997−1998	40	2	0	0	8
199	Andrew Hart	1997−1998	37	4	0	0	16
200	Brendon Tunbridge	1997−1998	19	0	0	0	0
201	Brendon Hauville	1997	6	1	0	0	4
202	Will Robinson	1997−1998	25	5	0	0	20
203	Jason Hooper	1997−1998	11	0	0	0	0
204	Terry Lamey	1997−1998	34	2	0	0	8
205	Chris Leikvoll	1997−1998	24	1	0	0	4
206	Craig Wilson	1998	24	3	0	1	13
207	Tim Horan	1998	3	0	1	0	2
208	Craig Fitzgibbon	1998	20	2	38	0	84
209	Luke Patten	1998	13	5	0	0	20
210	Paul Rossi	1998	3	0	0	0	0
211	Sami Chamoun	1998	5	0	0	0	0
