= 1998 Illawarra Steelers season =

Illawarra Steelers
- 1998 season
- CEO: (Australia) Bob Millward
- Head coach: (Australia) Andrew Farrar
- Captain: (Australia) Paul McGregor
- NRL: 12th (out of 20)
- Top try scorer: Club: Trent Barrett (18)
- Top points scorer: Club: Craig Fitzgibbon (84)
- Highest home attendance: 13,106 (vs Canterbury, 23 August 1998, WIN Stadium)
- Lowest home attendance: 6,558 (vs North Queensland Cowboys, 25 June 1998, WIN Stadium)
- Average home attendance: 9,248 (Season total: 110,975)

The 1998 Illawarra Steelers season was the club's seventeenth and final season, spanning across the three rugby league competitions of the NSWRL, ARL and NRL. A home loss by a field goal to the hands of the Craig Polla-Mounter and his Canterbury-Bankstown Bulldogs team, plus results going against them in the final round of the regular season saw the Steelers finish 12th. Andrew Farrar's team of hopefuls were unable to make the finals series and were put under pressure to merge or fold when the league was expected to cut the twenty-team competition down to fourteen for the 1999 season. The club would eventually form a joint-venture with the St. George Dragons for the start of the 1999 NRL season.

== Players ==
=== Squad ===
No.

Position
Player

Trent Barrett – FE Darren Bradstreet – SR Adam Bristow – LK Jonathan Britten – WG Dean Callaway – HK Wayne Clifford – WG Scott Cram – PR Andrew Hart – PR Jason Hooper – CE Terry Lamey – SR Chris Leikvoll – PR Brad Mackay – LK

No.

Position
Player

Paul McGregor – CE (captain) Dean Moon – WG Andrew Purcell – HK Brendon Reeves – FB Will Robinson – HB Craig Simon – CE Craig Smith – PR Shaun Timmins – CE Brendon Tunbridge – SR Craig Wilson – SR Rod Wishart – WG

=== Player Movements ===
Gains

Player	Previous club
Craig Wilson	South Queensland Crushers

Losses

Player	Joined Club
John Cross	Penrith Panthers
Fili Seru	retired

== Ladder ==
1998 NRL season
Pos	Team	Pld	W	D	L	PF	PA	PD	Pts
1	Brisbane Broncos (P)	24	18	1	5	688	310	+378	37
2	Newcastle Knights	24	18	1	5	562	381	+181	37
3	Melbourne Storm	24	17	1	6	546	372	+174	35
4	Parramatta Eels	24	17	1	6	468	349	+119	35
5	North Sydney Bears	24	17	0	7	663	367	+296	34
6	Sydney City Roosters	24	16	0	8	680	383	+297	32
7	Canberra Raiders	24	15	0	9	564	429	+135	30
8	St. George Dragons	24	13	1	10	486	490	−4	27
9	Canterbury-Bankstown Bulldogs	24	13	0	11	489	411	+78	26
10	Manly Warringah Sea Eagles	24	13	0	11	503	473	+30	26
11	Cronulla-Sutherland Sharks	24	12	1	11	438	387	+51	25
12	Illawarra Steelers	24	11	1	12	476	539	−63	23
13	Balmain Tigers	24	9	1	14	381	463	−82	19
14	Penrith Panthers	24	8	2	14	525	580	−55	18
15	Auckland Warriors	24	9	0	15	417	518	−101	18
16	North Queensland Cowboys	24	9	0	15	361	556	−195	18
17	Adelaide Rams	24	7	0	17	393	615	−222	14
18	South Sydney Rabbitohs	24	5	0	19	339	560	−221	10
19	Gold Coast Chargers	24	4	0	20	289	654	−365	8
20	Western Suburbs Magpies	24	4	0	20	371	802	−431	8

(P) Premiers

== Draw and Results ==
Round 1: 14 March 1998	Illawarra Steelers	12–14	Melbourne Storm	Wollongong, New South Wales
19:30	Tries: Craig Wilson; Will Robinson; Goals: Dean Moon 2/4		Tries: Scott Hill 2 Goals: Craig Smith 3/3	Stadium: WIN Stadium; Attendance: 10,695; Referee: Sean Hampstead

22 March 1998	South Sydney Rabbitohs	14–22	Illawarra Steelers	Sydney, New South Wales
14:30	Tries: Chris Caruana; Troy Slattery Goals: Julian O'Neill 3/3		Tries: Rod Wishart; Brad Mackay; Paul McGregor; Trent Barrett; Goals: Rod Wishart 3/5	Stadium: Aussie Stadium; Attendance: 8,708; Referee: Paul McBlane

28 March 1998	Illawarra Steelers	18–37	Newcastle Knights	Wollongong, New South Wales
15:30	Tries: Trent Barrett 2 Andrew Hart Goals: Craig Fitzgibbon 2/2; Tim Horan 1/1		Tries: Bill Peden 2 Owen Craigie; Andrew Johns; Robbie O'Davis; Neil Piccinelli; Goals: Andrew Johns 5/6; Owen Craigie 1/1; Field Goals: Andrew Johns 1	Stadium: WIN Stadium; Attendance: 9,141; Referee: Steve Clark

3 April 1998	Sydney City Roosters	30–16	Illawarra Steelers	Sydney, New South Wales
19:30	Tries: Andrew Walker 2 Nigel Gaffey; Ivan Cleary; Scott Gouley; Goals: Ivan Cleary 5		Tries: Will Robinson; Trent Barrett; Goals: Craig Fitzgibbon 4	Stadium: Aussie Stadium; Attendance: 7,106; Referee: Paul McBlane

11 April 1998	Illawarra Steelers	12–19	St. George Dragons	Wollongong, New South Wales
00:00	Tries: Craig Wilson; Shaun Timmins; Goals: Craig Fitzgibbon 2		Tries: Corey Pearson; Jim Lenihan; Jamie Ainscough; Mark Coyne; Goals: Lee Murphy 1 Field Goals: Jamie Ainscough 1	Stadium: WIN Stadium; Attendance: 9,427; Referee: Brian Grant

18 April 1998	Canberra Raiders	20–22	Illawarra Steelers	Canberra, Australian Capital Territory
15:30	Tries: Jason Croker; Ben Kennedy; Luke Priddis; Goals: David Furner 4		Tries: Shaun Timmins; Brendon Reeves; Andrew Purcell; Craig Fitzgibbon; Goals: Craig Fitzgibbon 2 Darren Bradstreet 1	Stadium: Bruce Stadium; Attendance: 8,238; Referee: Sean Hampstead

26 April 1998	Illawarra Steelers	20–12	Parramatta Eels	Wollongong, New South Wales
14:30	Tries: Paul McGregor; Trent Barrett; Terry Lamey; Goals: Craig Fitzgibbon 4		Tries: Shane Whereat; John Simon; Goals: Clinton Schifcofske 2	Stadium: WIN Stadium; Attendance: 9,119; Referee: Tim Mander

2 May 1998	Penrith Panthers	38–14	Illawarra Steelers	Penrith, New South Wales
00:00	Tries: Robbie Beckett 2 Andrew Hinson; Ryan Girdler; Gordon Falcon; Peter Jorgensen; Craig Wise; Goals: Ryan Girdler 5		Tries: Jonathon Britten; Craig Simon; Paul McGregor; Goals: Brendon Reeves 1	Stadium: Penrith Stadium; Attendance: 6,154; Referee: Matt Hewitt

9 May 1998	Illawarra Steelers	42–20	Western Suburbs Magpies	Wollongong, New South Wales
19:30	Tries: Craig Simon 2 Will Robinson; Andrew Purcell; Terry Lamey; Paul McGregor; Rod Wishart; Goals: Rod Wishart 7		Tries: Ken McGuiness; Jared Mills; Ron Jones; Kevin McGuiness; Goals: Brett Warton 2	Stadium: WIN Stadium; Attendance: 7,636; Referee: Paul McBlane

16 May 1998	St. George Dragons	32–16	Illawarra Steelers	Kogarah, New South Wales
19:30	Tries: Goals:		Tries: Goals:	Stadium: Kogarah Oval; Attendance: 6,296; Referee: Sean Hampstead

24 May 1998	Melbourne Storm	14–14	Illawarra Steelers	Melbourne, Victoria
	Tries: Glenn Lazarus; Robbie Ross; Goals: Craig Smith 3		Tries: Trent Barrett 2 Brendon Reeves; Goals: Rod Wishart 1	Stadium: Olympic Park; Attendance: 9,018; Referee: Paul Simpkins

31 May 1998	Illawarra Steelers	18–12	South Sydney Rabbitohs	Wollongong, New South Wales
14:30	Tries: Trent Barrett; Paul McGregor; Andrew Hart; Goals: Craig Fitzgibbon 3		Tries: Tim Brasher; Julian O'Neill; Goals: Simon Forrest 2	Stadium: WIN Stadium; Attendance: 8,174; Referee: Mogsheen Jadwat

6 June 1998	Gold Coast Chargers	10–32	Illawarra Steelers	Gold Coast, Queensland
19:30	Tries: Jason Hudson; Andrew King; Goals: Scott Thorburn		Tries: Trent Barrett 2 Rod Wishart; Dean Callaway; Will Robinson; Craig Wilson; Goals: Rod Wishart 4	Stadium: Carrara Stadium; Attendance: 3,762; Referee: Eddie Ward

14 June 1998	Illawarra Steelers	16–38	Balmain Tigers	Wollongong, New South Wales
14:30	Tries: Craig Simon; Jonathon Britten; Trent Barrett; Goals: Rod Wishart; Craig Fitzgibbon		Tries: Laloa Milford 3 Michael Gillett; William Kennedy; Brendan Magnus; Jason Webber; Goals: Shannon Nevin 5	Stadium: WIN Stadium; Attendance: 10,076; Referee: Paul McBlane

20 June 1998	Adelaide Rams	4–39	Illawarra Steelers	Whyalla, South Australia
14:30	Tries: David Kidwell Goals: Luke Williamson 0/1		Tries: Dean Callaway 2 Wayne Clifford 2 Andrew Hart; Craig Fitzgibbon; Luke Patten; Goals: Brad Mackay 3/5; Craig Fitzgibbon 2/3; Field Goals: Trent Barrett 1	Stadium: Bennett Oval; Attendance: 5,153; Referee: Steve Chiddy

28 June 1998	Illawarra Steelers	24–18	North Queensland Cowboys	Wollongong, New South Wales
14:30	Tries: Andrew Purcell; Jonathon Britten; Trent Barrett; Shaun Timmins; Goals: Brad Mackay 2 Craig Fitzgibbon 2		Tries: Josh Hannay 2 B Tabui; Noa Nadruku; Goals: Josh Hannay 1	Stadium: WIN Stadium; Attendance: 6,558; Referee: Sean Hampstead

4 July 1998	Auckland Warriors	14–17	Illawarra Steelers	Auckland, New Zealand
	Tries: Stephen Kearney; Joe Vagana; Syd Eru; Goals: Stacey Jones 1		Tries: Wayne Clifford 2 Shaun Timmins; Goals: Rod Wishart 1 Craig Fitzgibbon 1 Field Goals: Craig Wilson 1	Stadium: Ericsson Stadium; Attendance: 8,000; Referee: Tim Mander

12 July 1998	Illawarra Steelers	12–18	Brisbane Broncos	Wollongong, New South Wales
	Tries: Dean Callaway; Paul McGregor Goals: Rod Wishart 2/2		Tries: Andrew Gee; Wendell Sailor; Darren Smith; Gorden Tallis; Goals: Michael De Vere 1/2; Darren Lockyer 0/2	Stadium: WIN Stadium; Attendance: 12,018

18 July 1998	Manly	22-12	Illawarra Steelers	Manly, New South Wales
	Tries: Duncan 2 John Hopoate; Steve Menzies; Craig Hancock; Goals: Duncan 1		Tries: Craig Simon; Luke Patten; Goals: Rod Wishart 1 Craig Fitzgibbon 1	Stadium: Brookvale Oval; Attendance: 5,631

25 July 1998	Illawarra Steelers	6–32	North Sydney Bears	Wollongong, New South Wales
	Tries: Craig Simon; Goals: Craig Fitzgibbon 1		Tries: Michael Buettner 3 Adam Muir; Gary Larson; Goals: Jason Taylor 6	Stadium: WIN Stadium; Attendance: 6,847

1 August 1998	Newcastle Knights	26–28	Illawarra Steelers	Newcastle, New South Wales
	Tries: Jason Moodie; Owen Craigie; Andrew Johns; Danny Buderus; Peter Shiels; Goals: Owen Craigie 2 Andrew Johns 1		Tries: Trent Barrett 3 Luke Patten; Will Robinson; Goals: Craig Fitzgibbon 3 Rod Wishart 1	Stadium: Marathon Stadium; Attendance: 20,026; Referee: Steve Clark

9 August 1998	Illawarra Steelers	10–48	Sydney City Roosters	Wollongong, New South Wales
	Tries: Shaun Timmins; Andrew Purcell; Goals: Craig Fitzgibbon 1		Tries: Brad Fittler 2 B Miles 2 Matt Sing; Ivan Cleary; Adrian Lam; Nat Wood; Goals: Ivan Cleary 8	Stadium: WIN Stadium; Attendance: 8,178; Referee: Sean Hampstead

15 August 1998	Cronulla	22–30	Illawarra Steelers	Cronulla, New South Wales
	Tries: Russell Richardson 2 Mat Rogers; Dean Treister; Goals: Mat Rogers 3		Tries: Jonathon Britten 2 Shaun Timmins; Trent Barrett; Craig Simon; Goals: Craig Fitzgibbon 4 Rod Wishart 1	Stadium: Shark Park; Attendance: 6,487; Referee: Brian Grant

23 August 1998	Illawarra Steelers	24–25	Canterbury	Wollongong, New South Wales
14:30	Tries: Luke Patten 2 Trent Barrett; Adam Bristow; Goals: Craig Fitzgibbon 4		Tries: Rod Silva; Gavin Lester; Jason Hetherington; Glen Hughes; Goals: Daryl Halligan 4 Field-Goals: Craig Polla-Mounter 1	Stadium: WIN Stadium; Attendance: 13,016; Referee: Steve Clark

== Home Crowd Averages ==
Round	Opposition	Venue	Crowd
Round 1	Melbourne Storm	WIN Stadium	10,695
Round 3	Newcastle Knights	WIN Stadium	9,141
Round 5	St. George Dragons	WIN Stadium	9,427
Round 7	Parramatta Eels	WIN Stadium	9,119
Round 9	Western Suburbs Magpies	WIN Stadium	7,636
Round 12	South Sydney Rabbitohs	WIN Stadium	8,174
Round 14	Balmain Tigers	WIN Stadium	10,076
Round 16	North Queensland Cowboys	WIN Stadium	6,558
Round 18	Brisbane Broncos	WIN Stadium	12,018
Round 20	North Sydney Bears	WIN Stadium	6,847
Round 22	Sydney City Roosters	WIN Stadium	8,178
Round 24	Canterbury-Bankstown Bulldogs	WIN Stadium	13,106
Season Total			110,975
Season Average			9,248
