= 1997 Illawarra Steelers season =

Illawarra Steelers
- 1997 season
- CEO: (Australia) Bob Millward
- Head coach: (Australia) Andrew Farrar
- Captain: (Australia) Paul McGregor
- NRL: 6th (out of 12)
- Top try scorer: Club: Wayne Clifford (14)
- Top points scorer: Club: Wayne Clifford (56)
- Highest home attendance: 12,089 (vs. Gold Coast Chargers, 30 August 1997, at WIN Stadium)
- Lowest home attendance: 5,546 (vs. Western Suburbs Magpies, 10 May 1997, at WIN Stadium)
- Average home attendance: 8,695

The 1997 Illawarra Steelers season was the sixteenth in the club's history. The side made its second appearance in the play-offs, the first ending with the infamous 1992 semi-finals 4-0 loss to the St. George Dragons. Whilst making the finals, the season ultimately ended up as a disappointment, losing in the first week to the Gold Coast Chargers. Many expected them to win this match easily as they had beaten their opponents comfortably 28-6 the week before.

== Season summary ==
The Steelers lost several players before the start of this season, including veterans Neil Piccinelli, David Riolo, Brendan O'Meara and Darren Fritz, leaving a massive hole to be filled by many inexperienced juniors. They gained only halfback/hooker Will Robinson from Souths. The beginning of the season looked promising for the Steelers with four wins, one draw and one loss from their first six games, leaving them sitting third on the ladder. However, they failed to win any of their next seven games, which included two draws. This middle portion of the season did not bode well for the club’s finals prospects, but to their credit, they won four of their next five games and the final two matches of the season when a post-season berth was on the line. Disappointingly for the Steelers, a 25-14 loss at Parramatta Stadium at the hands of the Gold Coast Chargers in the first week of the finals spelt a disastrous end to a season which could have produced so much more, as some of the country’s most formidable sides were competing in the rival Telstra Super League tournament.

== Player movements ==
Gains

Player	Previous club
Will Robinson	South Sydney Rabbitohs

Losses

Player	Joined Club
Paul Carige	Parramatta Eels
Darrien Doherty	Hunter Mariners
Darren Fritz	North Sydney Bears
Brendan O'Meara	South Sydney Rabbitohs
Neil Piccinelli	Hunter Mariners
Wayne Richards	Newcastle Knights
David Riolo	Parramatta Eels
Craig Simon	South Sydney
Josh White	London Broncos

== Squad ==
No.

Position
Player

Glen Air – HB Trent Barrett – FE Darren Bradstreet – SR Adam Bristow – LK Jonathan Britten – WG Dean Callaway – HK Wayne Clifford – WG David Cox – PR Scott Cram – PR John Cross – LK Michael Cross – SR Maea David – PR Andrew Hart – PR Brendon Hauville – WG Jason Hooper – CE

No.

Position
Player

Terry Lamey – SR Chris Leikvoll – PR Brad Mackay – LK Paul McGregor – CE (captain) Dean Moon – WG Andrew Purcell – HK Brendon Reeves – FB Will Robinson – HB Brett Rodwell – CE Fili Seru – WG Craig Simon – CE Craig Smith – PR Shaun Timmins – CE Brendon Tunbridge – SR Rod Wishart – WG

== Draw and Results ==
=== Quick Summary ===
1997 Illawarra Steelers season summary

Round	Home	Score	Away
1	Steelers	50-10	Souths
2	Balmain	10-18	Steelers
3	Steelers	8-20	St. George
4	Norths	18-18	Steelers
5	Steelers	14-6	Sth Qld
6	Sydney	20-26	Steelers

Round	Home	Score	Away
7	Steelers	16-23	Parramatta
8	Newcastle	20-4	Steelers
9	Steelers	34-34	Manly
10	Steelers	2-6	Wests
11	Gold Coast	10-11	Steelers
12	Souths	28-28	Steelers

Round	Home	Score	Away
13	Steelers	6-18	Balmain
14	St. George	10-12	Steelers
15	Steelers	15-8	Norths
16	Sth Qld	8-34	Steelers
17	Steelers	12-34	Sydney
18	Parramatta	24-28	Steelers

Round	Home	Score	Away
19	Steelers	12-22	Newcastle
20	Manly	30-14	Steelers
21	Wests	10-34	Steelers
22	Steelers	28-6	Gold Coast
F1	Steelers	14-25	Gold Coast

=== March (2-1-1) ===
Round 1: 9 March 1997; Optus Cup	Illawarra Steelers	(20) 50–10 (10)	South Sydney Rabbitohs	Wollongong, New South Wales
	Tries: Brett Rodwell 3; Rod Wishart 2; Wayne Clifford 2; Brad Mackay; Shaun Timmins; Goals: Rod Wishart 7/9		Tries: M.Manning; Goals: M.Manning 3/3	Stadium: WIN Stadium; Attendance: 7,697; Referee: Paul McBlane (field)

Steelers Lineup: Reeves; Wishart, Timmins, McGregor (c), Clifford; Barrett, Air; Bradstreet, Callaway, Smith, Bristow, Mackay, Rodwell. Interchange: Cram, Tunbridge, David, Hart.

Round 2: 15 March 1997; Optus Cup	Balmain Tigers	(10) 10–18 (0)	Illawarra Steelers	Sydney, New South Wales
	Tries: William Kennedy; Goals: C.Freer 2/3; Michael Withers 1/1		Tries: Wayne Clifford 2; Rod Wishart; Goals: Rod Wishart 3/4	Stadium: Leichhardt Oval; Attendance: 8,211; Referee: David Manson (field)

Steelers Lineup: Reeves; Wishart, Timmins, McGregor (c), Clifford; Barrett, Air; Bradstreet, Callaway, Smith, Bristow, Mackay, Rodwell. Interchange: Tunbridge, Cram, David, J.Cross.

Round 3: 22 March 1997; Optus Cup	Illawarra Steelers	(4) 8–20 (18)	St. George Dragons	Wollongong, New South Wales
	Tries: Glen Air; Goals: Rod Wishart 2/3		Tries: Daniel Wagon; Jim Lenihan; S.Kenward; Goals: Wayne Bartrim 4/5	Stadium: WIN Stadium; Attendance: 8,661; Referee: Paul Simpkins (field)

Steelers Lineup: Reeves; Wishart, Timmins, McGregor (c), Clifford; Barrett, Air; Bradstreet, Callaway, Smith, Bristow, Mackay, Rodwell. Interchange: Tunbridge, Cram, David, J.Cross.

Round 4: 28 March 1997; Optus Cup	North Sydney Bears	(4) 18–18 (14)	Illawarra Steelers	Sydney, New South Wales
	Tries: Chris Caruana; Matt Seers; Jason Taylor; Goals: Jason Taylor 3/4		Tries: Brendon Reeves; Wayne Clifford; Dean Callaway; Bredon Hauville; Goals: Rod Wishart 1/3; Shaun Timmins 0/1	Stadium: North Sydney Oval; Attendance: 8,319; Referee: Paul McBlane (field)

It was a day of draws for the Steelers and the Bears. All three grades were drawn (U-20s: 12-all, Reserves: 18-all, Firsts: 18-all). After capitulating in the second half, the Steelers saw themselves down 18-14, losing their 14-4 lead at half-time. Brendon Hauville scored in the final minutes, in what seemed to be a get-out-jail move by the substitute, who had come on for winger and regular goal-kicker Rod Wishart. What should have been a last-minute victory for the Steelers instead became a fruitless event when Shaun Timmins missed the conversion from in front of the uprights. It was just not their day for defeating the Bears.

Steelers Lineup: Reeves; Wishart, Timmins, McGregor (c), Clifford; Barrett, Robinson; Bradstreet, Callaway, Smith, Cram, Mackay, Rodwell. Interchange: Tunbridge, J.Cross, Bristow, Hauville.

=== April (2-0-2) ===
Round 5: 6 April 1997; Optus Cup	Illawarra Steelers	(4) 14–6 (0)	South Queensland Crushers	Wollongong, New South Wales
	Tries: Adam Bristow; Shaun Timmins; Trent Barrett; Goals: Darren Bradstreet 1/1; Brendon Reeves 0/2		Tries: Jason Hudson; Goals: Jason Hudson 1/2	Stadium: WIN Stadium; Attendance: 6,144; Referee: Matt Hewitt (field)

Steelers Lineup: Reeves; Hauville, Timmins, McGregor (c), Clifford; Barrett, Air; Bradstreet, Robinson, Smith, Cram, Mackay, J.Cross. Interchange: Bristow, Tunbridge, David, Hart.

Round 6: 13 April 1997; Optus Cup	Sydney City Roosters	(12) 20–42 (16)	Illawarra Steelers	Sydney, New South Wales
	Tries: Ivan Cleary; Andrew Walker; Shane Rigon; Goals: Ivan Cleary 4/4		Tries: Trent Barrett 2; Brendon Reeves 2; John Cross; Goals: Darren Bradstreet 2/3; Brendon Reeves 1/2	Stadium: Sydney Football Stadium; Attendance: 7,600; Referee: Paul Simpkins (field)

Steelers Lineup: Reeves; Hauville, Timmins, McGregor (c), Clifford; Barrett, Air; Bradstreet, Robinson, Smith, Cram, Mackay, J.Cross. Interchange: Bristow, Tunbridge, David, Hart.

Round 7: 19 April 1997; Optus Cup	Illawarra Steelers	(8) 16–23 (20)	Parramatta Eels	Wollongong, New South Wales
	Tries: Will Robinson; Adam Bristow; Wayne Clifford; Goals: Darren Bradstreet 1/3; Brendon Reeves 1/1		Tries: Stuart Kelly 2; Shane Whereat; Jason Bell; Goals: Ian Herron 3/5; John Simon field goal	Stadium: WIN Stadium; Attendance: 11,992; Referee: Sean Hampstead (field)

Steelers Lineup: Reeves; Hauville, Timmins, McGregor (c), Clifford; Barrett, Air; Bradstreet, Robinson, Smith, Cram, Mackay, J.Cross. Interchange: Bristow, David, Tunbridge, Seru.

Round 8: 27 April 1997; Optus Cup	Newcastle Knights	(6) 20–4 (4)	Illawarra Steelers	Newcastle, New South Wales
	Tries: Jason Moodie; Owen Craigie; Mathew Gidley; Robbie O'Davis; Goals: Robbie O'Davis 2/3; Leo Dynevor 0/2		Tries: Glen Air; Goals: Brendon Reeves 0/1	Stadium: Marathon Stadium; Attendance: 12,582; Referee: Kelvin Jeffes (field)

Steelers Lineup: Reeves; Seru, Timmins, McGregor (c), Clifford; Barrett, Air; Cram, Robinson, Smith, Bradstreet, Mackay, J.Cross. Interchange: Bristow, David, Rodwell, Tunbridge.

=== May (0-2-2) ===
Round 9: 4 May 1997; Optus Cup	Illawarra Steelers	(18) 34–34 (18)	Manly Sea Eagles	Wollongong, New South Wales
	Tries: Brad Mackay; Trent Barrett; John Cross; Brendon Reeves; Scott Cram; Shaun Timmins; Goals: Darren Bradstreet 3/4; Brendon Reeves 2/3		Tries: Craig Innes 3; Terry Hill 2; Danny Moore; Goals: Craig Field 5/6	Stadium: WIN Stadium; Attendance: 9,835; Referee: David Manson (field)

A gripping twelve try game. By the end of the match these two clubs equalled the premiership record for the highest score for a drawn game at 34-all. Manly started great and finished strong. The Steelers were up 34-22 with six minutes remaining. However, they only had eleven men on the field and the Sea Eagles ran them home. Five-Eighth Trent Barrett was sent off in the 66th minute for a high tackle on Steve Menzies and David Cox was sin binned in the 69th minute. Manly stayed at the top of the table with 15 points and the Steelers were sitting fifth with ten by the end of the round. Barrett received a two-match ban for the tackle.

Steelers Lineup: Reeves; Seru, Rodwell, Timmins, Clifford; Barrett, Air; Smith, Robinson, Bradstreet, Bristow, Mackay, J.Cross (c). Interchange: Cram, David, Cox, Purcell.

Round 10: 10 May 1997; Optus Cup	Illawarra Steelers	(0) 2–6 (0)	Western Suburbs Magpies	Wollongong, New South Wales
	Goals: Darren Bradstreet 1/3		Tries: Des Hasler; Goals: Andrew Leeds 1/3	Stadium: WIN Stadium; Attendance: 5,546; Referee: Sean Hampstead (field)

The supporters stayed away from Saturday night's wind and rain. Everything about the night was miserable for the five-thousand Steelers fans that bothered to show up. Only one try was scored in stark contrast to the entertaining twelve-try feast of the previous week against the Manly Sea Eagles at the same venue. Both fullbacks, Brendon Reeves (Illawarra) and Andrew Leeds (Wests), were sin binned during the game.

Steelers Lineup: Reeves; Seru, Timmins, Rodwell, Clifford; Purcell, Air; Bradstreet, Robinson, Smith, David, Bristow, J.Cross (c). Interchange: Cram, Cox, Hart, Hooper.

Round 11: 17 May 1997; Optus Cup	Gold Coast	(6) 11–10 (4)	Illawarra Steelers	Gold Coast, Queensland
	Tries: Jamie Goddard; Graham Mackay; Goals: Brendan Hurst 1/3, field goal		Tries: Shaun Timmins; Will Robinson; Goals: Rod Wishart 1/2	Stadium: Carrara Stadium; Attendance: 5,813; Referee: David Manson (field)

Brendan Hurst's late field goal leaves Illawarra's chances in the competition diminishing, dropping to seventh on ten points with Wests and St. George waiting eagerly below them, also with ten points.

Steelers Lineup: Seru; Wishart, Rodwell, McGregor (c), Clifford; Timmins, Robinson; Cram, J.Cross, Smith, Bristow, Bradstreet, Hart. Interchange: Reeves, Cox, David, M.Cross.

Round 12: 25 May 1997; Optus Cup	South Sydney Rabbitohs	(12) 28–28 (18)	Illawarra Steelers	Sydney, New South Wales
	Tries: Darrell Trindall; Paul Sutton; Craig Simon; Phil Howlett; Marty Moore; Goals: Julian O'Neill 4/7		Tries: Darren Bradstreet; Brendon Reeves; David Cox; Will Robinson; Wayne Clifford; Goals: Darren Bradstreet 2/2; Brendon Reeves 2/4	Stadium: Sydney Football Stadium; Attendance: 4,271; Referee: Mogsheen Jadwat (field)

Illawarra recorded a third draw of the season, finishing 28–28. The match featured ten tries and an attendance of less than five thousand. Following the result, Illawarra moved into eighth place, falling outside of playoff contention for the first time in the campaign.

Steelers Lineup: Reeves; Seru, Rodwell, Timmins, Clifford; Barrett, Robinson; Cram, J.Cross (c), Bradstreet, Bristow, Hart, Mackay. Interchange: Cox, Tunbridge, Lamey, Leikvoll.

=== June (1-0-1) ===
Round 13: 6 June 1997; Optus Cup	Illawarra Steelers	(0) 6–18 (12)	Balmain Tigers	Wollongong, New South Wales
	Tries: Trent Barrett; Goals: Darren Bradstreet 1/1		Tries: Laloa Milford; William Kennedy; Adam Starr; Goals: Michael Withers 3/3	Stadium: WIN Stadium; Attendance: 8,184; Referee: Matt Hewitt (field)

It was a disappointing first Friday Night Football of the season for the Illawarra side at home, losing 18-6 to a Balmain Tigers side seething from their second-round loss at Leichhardt the first time these two teams met in the season. The Tigers held onto their 12-0 lead at the break. Barrett got one back for the Steelers, taking them only six points behind, but an Adam Starr try held-off any attempted comeback. The result aided the Steelers slip down the ladder into tenth.

Steelers Lineup: Reeves; Seru, Rodwell, Timmins, Clifford; Barrett, Robinson; Cram, Callaway, Bradstreet, Hart, Mackay, J.Cross (c). Interchange: Cox, Bristow, Leikvoll, Air.

Round 14: 22 June 1997; Optus Cup	St. George Dragons	(4) 10–12 (8)	Illawarra Steelers	Sydney, New South Wales
	Tries: Colin Ward; Mark Bell; Goals: Steven Price 1/2; Gavin Clinch 0/2		Tries: Brett Rodwell 2; Glen Air; Goals: Darren Bradstreet 0/2; Brendon Reeves 0/2	Stadium: Kogarah Oval; Attendance: 7,257; Referee: Paul Simpkins (field)

The third and final game of weekend due to the split round saw the Steelers side completely dominate the St. George team, but they failed to convert their superiority into points. They eventually got themselves over the line with two minutes remaining through experienced centre Brett Rodwell, winning 12-10. The win saw them leap-frog St. George and Balmain back up into eighth position, one place away from finals footy.

Steelers Lineup: Reeves; Britten, Rodwell, Timmins, Clifford; Air, Robinson; Cram, Callaway, Bradstreet, Hart, Mackay, J.Cross (c). Interchange: Leikvoll, Lamey, Cox.

== Ladder ==
	Team	Pld	W	D	L	PF	PA	PD	Pts
1	Manly	22	15	2	5	521	366	+155	32
2	Newcastle	22	14	1	7	512	320	+192	29
3	Parramatta	22	14	1	7	431	359	+72	29
4	North Sydney	22	13	1	8	529	341	+188	27
5	Sydney City	22	13	1	8	487	366	+121	27
6	Illawarra	22	10	3	9	423	376	+47	23
7	Gold Coast	22	10	1	11	438	466	-28	21
8	Balmain	22	10	0	12	339	340	-1	20
9	Western Suburbs	22	10	0	12	355	424	-69	20
10	St. George	22	9	1	12	331	392	-61	19
11	South Sydney	22	4	1	17	323	630	-307	9
12	South Queensland	22	4	0	18	321	630	-309	8

== Home Crowd Averages ==
Round	Opposition	Venue	Crowd
Round 1	South Sydney Rabbitohs	WIN Stadium, Wollongong	7,697
Round 3	St. George Dragons	WIN Stadium, Wollongong	8,661
Round 5	South Queensland Crushers	WIN Stadium, Wollongong	6,144
Round 7	Parramatta Eels	WIN Stadium, Wollongong	11,992
Round 9	Manly Sea Eagles	WIN Stadium, Wollongong	9,835
Round 10	Western Suburbs Magpies	WIN Stadium, Wollongong	5,546
Round 13	Balmain Tigers	WIN Stadium, Wollongong	8,184
Round 15	North Sydney Bears	WIN Stadium, Wollongong	7,219
Round 17	Sydney City Roosters	WIN Stadium, Wollongong	8,241
Round 19	Newcastle Knights	WIN Stadium, Wollongong	10,038
Round 22	Gold Coast Chargers	WIN Stadium, Wollongong	12,089
Total			95,646
Average			8,695
