= 1996 Manly-Warringah Sea Eagles season =

- ARL champions
- ARL rank: 1st
- 1996 record: Wins: 21; losses: 4
- Points scored: For: 609; against: 213

Team information
- Coach: (Australia) Bob Fulton
- Captains: (Australia) Geoff Toovey; (Australia) Matthew Ridge (vice-captain)
- Stadium: Brookvale Oval

Top scorers
- Tries: (Australia) Steve Menzies (20)
- Goals: (Australia) Matthew Ridge (68)
- Points: (Australia) Matthew Ridge (165)
← 1995	1997 →

The 1996 Manly Warringah Sea Eagles season was the 50th in the club's history since their entry into the then New South Wales Rugby Football League premiership in 1947.

The 1996 Sea Eagles were coached by triple Manly premiership player and 1987 Premiership winning coach Bob Fulton. Captaining the side was local junior, halfback Geoff Toovey. The club competed in the Australian Rugby League's 1996 Premiership season and played its home games at the 27,000 capacity Brookvale Oval.

== Ladder ==
	Team	Pld	W	D	L	PF	PA	PD	Pts
1	Manly-Warringah Sea Eagles	22	18	0	4	549	191	+358	36
2	Brisbane Broncos	21	17	0	4	607	263	+344	34
3	North Sydney Bears	22	15	2	5	598	325	+273	32
4	Sydney City Roosters	22	15	1	6	521	321	+200	31
5	Cronulla-Sutherland Sharks	21	14	2	5	399	268	+131	30
6	Canberra Raiders	21	13	1	7	538	384	+154	27
7	St. George Dragons	21	12	1	8	443	360	+83	27
8	Western Suburbs Magpies	22	12	1	9	394	434	−40	25
9	Newcastle Knights	21	10	1	10	416	388	+28	23
10	Canterbury-Bankstown Bulldogs	21	11	0	10	375	378	−3	22
11	Auckland Warriors	21	10	0	11	412	427	−15	22
12	Sydney Tigers	22	11	0	11	319	459	−140	22
13	Parramatta Eels	21	9	1	11	404	415	−11	21
14	Illawarra Steelers	22	8	0	14	403	444	−41	16
15	Penrith Panthers	21	7	1	13	363	464	−101	15
16	Western Reds	21	6	1	14	313	420	−107	13
17	North Queensland Cowboys	21	6	0	15	288	643	−355	12
18	Gold Coast Chargers	22	5	1	16	359	521	−162	11
19	South Sydney Rabbitohs	22	5	1	16	314	634	−320	11
20	South Queensland Crushers	21	3	0	18	220	496	−276	8

== Regular season ==
Sunday 24 March	Manly-Warringah Sea Eagles	44 – 6	South Sydney Rabbitohs	Brookvale Oval, Sydney
	Tries: Steve Menzies (4), Craig Innes, Jack Elsegood, Shannon Nevin; Goals: Jack Elsegood (4/5); Shannon Nevin (2/3)	[ Report]	Tries: Paul Mellor; Goals: Craig Field (1/1)	Attendance: 6,532; Referee: David Manson

Sunday 31 March	Manly-Warringah Sea Eagles	36 – 22	Gold Coast Chargers	Brookvale Oval, Sydney
	Tries: Daniel Gartner (2), Owen Cunningham, Jack Elsegood, John Hopoate, Craig Innes, Steve Menzies; Goals: Shannon Nevin (3/4); Jack Elsegood (1/3)	[ Report]	Tries: Shane Kenward (2), Kris Currie, Gavin Whittaker; Goals: Brendan Hurst (3/4)	Attendance: 5,895; Referee: Neil Almond

Sunday 7 April	North Sydney Bears	20 – 10	Manly-Warringah Sea Eagles	North Sydney Oval, Sydney
	Tries: Brett Dallas, Greg Florimo, Ben Ikin; Goals: Jason Taylor (4/4)	[ Report]	Tries: Steve Menzies, Danny Moore; Goals: Shannon Nevin (1/1)	Attendance: 21,379; Referee: David Manson

Sunday 14 April	Gold Coast Chargers	6 – 10	Manly-Warringah Sea Eagles	Carrara Oval, Gold Coast
	Tries: Jamie Goddard; Goals: Lee Oudenryn (1/1)	[ Report]	Tries: Cliff Lyons, Steve Menzies; Goals: Shannon Nevin (1/3)	Attendance: 10,643; Referee: Matt Hewitt

Friday 19 April	Manly-Warringah Sea Eagles	22 – 10	Auckland Warriors	Brookvale Oval, Sydney
	Tries: Jack Elsegood, Terry Hill, Craig Innes, Steve Menzies; Goals: Des Hasler (1/2); Craig Innes (1/2); Shannon Nevin (1/1)	[ Report]	Tries: Phil Blake, Gene Ngamu; Goals: Gene Ngamu (1/2)	Attendance: 18,588; Referee: Kelvin Jeffes

Sunday 28 April	South Queensland Crushers	6 – 14	Manly-Warringah Sea Eagles	Suncorp-Metway Stadium, Brisbane
	Tries: Craig Weston; Goals: Clinton Schifcofske (1/3)	[ Report]	Tries: Steve Menzies, Shannon Nevin; Goals: Shannon Nevin (3/3)	Attendance: 15,202; Referee: Neil Almond

Sunday 5 May	Manly-Warringah Sea Eagles	46 – 4	North Queensland Cowboys	Brookvale Oval, Sydney
	Tries: Danny Moore (3), John Hopoate (2), Mark Carroll, Jack Elsegood, Nik Kosef, Shannon Nevin; Goals: Shannon Nevin (5/9)	[ Report]	Tries: Steve Edmed; Goals:	Attendance: 5,227; Referee: Tony Maksoud

Friday 10 May	St. George Dragons	2 – 6	Manly-Warringah Sea Eagles	Jubilee Oval, Sydney
	Tries: Goals: Wayne Bartrim (1/1)	[ Report]	Tries: Terry Hill; Goals: Shannon Nevin (1/2)	Attendance: 13,079; Referee: David Manson

Friday 24 May	Manly-Warringah Sea Eagles	24 – 4	Canterbury-Bankstown Bulldogs	Brookvale Oval, Sydney
	Tries: Des Hasler, John Hopoate, Craig Innes, Danny Moore; Goals: Matthew Ridge (4/5)	[ Report]	Tries: Craig Polla-Mounter; Goals:	Attendance: 14,591; Referee: Kelvin Jeffes

Sunday 9 June	Manly-Warringah Sea Eagles	28 – 12	Canberra Raiders	Brookvale Oval, Sydney
	Tries: Daniel Gartner (2), Terry Hill, Cliff Lyons; Goals: Matthew Ridge (6/6)	[ Report]	Tries: David Furner, Noa Nadruku; Goals: Jason Ferris (1/1); David Furner (1/1)	Attendance: 20,557; Referee: David Manson

Friday 14 June	Brisbane Broncos	4 – 18	Manly-Warringah Sea Eagles	ANZ Stadium, Brisbane
	Tries: Paul Hauff; Goals:	[ Report]	Tries: Danny Moore, John Hopoate; Goals: Matthew Ridge (3/3)	Attendance: 19,837; Referee: Paul McBlane

Friday 21 June	Manly-Warringah Sea Eagles	29 – 6	North Sydney Bears	Brookvale Oval, Sydney
	Tries: Craig Innes (2), Terry Hill, Steve Menzies, Matthew Ridge; Goals: Matthew Ridge (4/5); Field Goals: Matthew Ridge (1)	[ Report]	Tries: Billy Moore; Goals: Jason Taylor (1/1)	Attendance: 21,217; Referee: Kelvin Jeffes

Sunday 30 June	Western Reds	11 – 8	Manly-Warringah Sea Eagles	WACA Ground, Perth
	Tries: Barrie-Jon Mather; Goals: Julian O'Neill (3/3); Field Goals: Julian O'Neill (1)	[ Report]	Tries: Steve Menzies; Goals: Matthew Ridge (2/2)	Attendance: 6,584; Referee: Mick Lewis

Sunday 7 July	Illawarra Steelers	8 – 16	Manly-Warringah Sea Eagles	Steelers Stadium, Wollongong
	Tries: Brett Rodwell, Rod Wishart; Goals:	[ Report]	Tries: Owen Cunningham, Jack Elsegood, Geoff Toovey; Goals: Matthew Ridge (2/3)	Attendance: 9,638; Referee: Matt Hewitt

Sunday 14 July	Manly-Warringah Sea Eagles	44 – 0	Parramatta Eels	Brookvale Oval, Sydney
	Tries: Craig Innes (3), Nik Kosef, Cliff Lyons, Danny Moore, Matthew Ridge, Geoff Toovey; Goals: Matthew Ridge (6/8)	[ Report]	Tries: Goals:	Attendance: Graeme West; Referee: 15,021

Monday 22 July	Sydney City Roosters	6 – 34	Manly-Warringah Sea Eagles	Sydney Football Stadium, Sydney
	Tries: Matt Sing; Goals: Ivan Cleary (1/1)	[ Report]	Tries: Mark Carroll, Daniel Gartner, Terry Hill, Danny Moore, Matthew Ridge; Goals: Matthew Ridge (7/7)	Attendance: 37,981; Referee: David Manson

Saturday 27 July	Manly-Warringah Sea Eagles	28 – 12	Newcastle Knights	Brookvale Oval, Sydney
	Tries: Jack Elsegood, Terry Hill, Steve Menzies, Geoff Toovey; Goals: Matthew Ridge (6/6)	[ Report]	Tries: Matthew Johns (2); Goals: Andrew Johns (2/2)	Attendance: 7,228; Referee: Paul McBlane

Monday 5 August	Cronulla-Sutherland Sharks	12 – 10	Manly-Warringah Sea Eagles	Shark Park, Sydney
	Tries: Adam Dykes, David Peachey; Goals: Mat Rogers (2/3)	[ Report]	Tries: Mark Carroll, Matthew Ridge; Goals: Matthew Ridge (1/3)	Attendance: 18,270; Referee: David Manson

Sunday 12 July	Manly-Warringah Sea Eagles	18 – 0	Sydney Tigers	Brookvale Oval, Sydney
	Tries: Terry Hill, Steve Menzies, Matthew Ridge; Goals: Matthew Ridge (3/4)	[ Report]	Tries: Goals:	Attendance: 8,270; Referee: Kelvin Jeffes

Sunday 18 August	Penrith Panthers	18 – 14	Manly-Warringah Sea Eagles	Penrith Football Stadium, Sydney
	Tries: Ned Catic, Craig Gower; Goals: Ryan Girdler (5/5)	[ Report]	Tries: Solomon Haumono, Craig Innes, Nik Kosef; Goals: Matthew Ridge (1/4)	Attendance: 7,426; Referee: Rob Alexander

Sunday 25 August	Manly-Warringah Sea Eagles	42 – 12	Western Suburbs Magpies	Brookvale Oval, Sydney
	Tries: Matthew Ridge (2), John Hopoate, Steve Menzies, Danny Moore; Goals: Matthew Ridge (11/11)	[ Report]	Tries: Bill Dunn, Andrew Willis; Goals: Andrew Leeds (2/2)	Attendance: 14,580; Referee: Kelvin Jeffes

Sunday 1 September	South Sydney Rabbitohs	10 – 48	Manly-Warringah Sea Eagles	Sydney Football Stadium, Sydney
	Tries: Greg Clarke (2); Goals: Shane Wilson (1/2)	[ Report]	Tries: John Hopoate (4), Steve Menzies (2), Daniel Gartner, Des Hasler, Danny Moore; Goals: Matthew Ridge (6/9)	Attendance: 4,317; Referee: Rob Alexander

== Finals ==
=== Qualifying Final ===
Sunday 8 September	Manly-Warringah Sea Eagles	16 – 14	Sydney City Roosters	Sydney Football Stadium, Sydney
	Tries: John Hopoate, Craig Innes, Steve Menzies; Goals: Matthew Ridge (2/4)	[ Report]	Tries: Brad Fittler; Goals: Ivan Cleary (5/5)	Attendance: 31,327; Referee: Paul McBlane

=== Preliminary Final ===
Sunday 22 September	Manly-Warringah Sea Eagles	24 – 0	Cronulla-Sutherland Sharks	Sydney Football Stadium, Sydney
	Tries: Steve Menzies (2), Cliff Lyons, Danny Moore; Goals: Matthew Ridge (1/2); Craig Innes (3/3)	[ Report]	Tries: Goals:	Attendance: 40,525; Referee: David Manson

=== Grand Final ===
Sunday 29 September

Manly-Warringah Sea Eagles	20 – 8	St. George Dragons
Tries: Craig Innes; Danny Moore; Goals: Matthew Ridge (3/3); Craig Innes (1/1)		Tries: Nick Zisti Goals: Wayne Bartrim (2/2)

Sydney Football Stadium, Sydney
Attendance: 40,985
Referee: David Manson
Player of the Match: Geoff Toovey

Manly-Warringah	St George

FB	1	Matthew Ridge
RW	2	Danny Moore
LC	3	Craig Innes
RC	4	Terry Hill
LW	5	John Hopoate
FE	13	Nik Kosef
HB	7	Geoff Toovey (c)
PR	17	David Gillespie
HK	9	Jim Serdaris
PR	10	Mark Carroll
SR	11	Steve Menzies
SR	12	Daniel Gartner
LK	8	Owen Cunningham
Substitutions:
IC	6	Cliff Lyons
IC	14	Neil Tierney
IC	16	Des Hasler
IC	19	Craig Hancock
Coach:
(Australia) Bob Fulton

FB	1	Dean Raper
RW	2	Nick Zisti
RC	3	Mark Coyne (c)
LC	4	Mark Bell
LW	5	Adrian Brunker
FE	6	Anthony Mundine
HB	7	Noel Goldthorpe
PR	8	Troy Stone
HK	9	Jeff Hardy
PR	10	Luke Felsch
SR	11	Scott Gourley
SR	12	Kevin Campion
LK	13	Wayne Bartrim
Substitutions:
IC	14	Nathan Brown
IC	15	Lance Thompson
IC	16	David Barnhill
IC	17	Colin Ward
Coach:
(Australia) David Waite

1st half
In the 5th minute, Manly centre Craig Innes won the chase and scored after a grubber kick by his skipper Geoff Toovey. Matthew Ridge converted from the sideline for 6–0. The Dragons played on after being awarded a penalty in front of the posts in the 8th minute but failed to score. At the 15-minute mark Saints' halfback Noel Goldthorpe conceded a penalty right in front of their goalpost after committing a head high tackle on Manly's Daniel Gartner. Ridge took the kick, extending the lead to 8–0. St. George sent in forward replacements Lance Thompson and David Barnhill for Scott Gourley and Kevin Campion (head cut). For Manly, Tierney came off the interchange bench to replace Gillespie. Up until the 19th minute mark when Manly veteran five-eighth Cliff Lyons took the field, their coach Bob Fulton was using six running forwards with Toovey as dummy half.

After turning down a relatively easy penalty goal chance not long after Manly's opening try, the Dragons' first points came in the 37th minute when Wayne Bartrim kicked a penalty awarded when Manly forward Cunningham stripped the ball. From the ensuing kick-off just before half-time came the game's controversial moment and a hotly disputed try. Ridge made a spectacular short kick-off and regathered, catching the Dragons unaware. St George hooker Nathan Brown appeared to tackle Ridge albeit one-handedly and by the collar. Ridge got up and ran when Brown was expecting him to stop and play the ball. Referee David Manson ruled that Brown did not complete the tackle. Ridge was eventually tackled just a few metres from the line. From dummy-half Nik Kosef then passed the ball to Steve Menzies who stormed his way through Saints' defense of Thompson, Raper, Goldthorpe and Bartrim to score next to the posts, giving Ridge an easy conversion kick. The controversial ruling by referee Manson gave Manly a 14–2 half time lead and broke Saints' resolve. In the process of scoring Menzies injured his groin/hamstring and although he returned for the second half, he was unable to run and was eventually replaced by coach Fulton.

2nd half
In the 53rd minute Manly's Danny Moore scored a try from a Terry Hill pass after Hill drew Saints defenders, Adrian Brunker and Nick Zisti. With Ridge off the field after being concussed in a tackle, Innes converted from 5m off the sideline for the Sea-Eagles to take a 20–2 lead. Five minutes later Dragons' winger Zisti scored a try from a Bartrim cut-out pass. Bartrim then converted from the sideline for a final scoreline of 20–8. The final twenty minutes were scoreless with two field goal attempts from Ridge charged down by Dragons' defenders.

In the days leading up to the game, Bob Fulton had named Manly's starting forward pack to be: Owen Cunningham, Jim Serdaris, Mark Carroll, Steve Menzies, Daniel Gartner and Nik Kosef. However, as had been usual over Manly's previous 4-5 games, before kick-off Fulton pulled a switch. He moved Cliff Lyons to the bench and started Kosef at 5/8. David Gillespie (wearing No.17) came off the bench to start at prop with Cunningham moved back to his usual position of lock. This actually meant that Owen Cunningham became the last Grand Final winning lock forward (as of 2024) to wear the old lock number of 8.

== Player statistics ==
Note: Games and (sub) show total games played, e.g. 1 (1) is 2 games played.

Player	Games (sub)	Tries	Goals	FG	Points
(Australia) Mark Carroll	23	3			12
(Australia) Owen Cunningham	24	2			8
(Australia) Matt Dunford	(2)				
(Australia) Jack Elsegood	13 (4)	6	5/8		34
(Australia) Scott Fulton	(5)				
(Australia) Daniel Gartner	19 (4)	6			24
(Australia) David Gillespie	17 (8)				
(Australia) Mathew Guberina	2 (1)				
(Australia) Craig Hancock	(3)				
(Australia) Des Hasler	10 (12)	2	1/2		10
(Tonga) Solomon Haumono	1 (13)	1			4
(Australia) Terry Hill	22	7			28
(Australia) John Hopoate	18 (5)	11			44
(New Zealand) Craig Innes	25	13	6/7		64
(Australia) Martin-John Kelly	(1)				
(Australia) Nik Kosef	18 (6)	3			12
(Australia) Cliff Lyons	20 (5)	4			16
(Australia) Steve Menzies	24	20			80
(Australia) Danny Moore	25	13			52
(Australia) Shannon Nevin	5 (4)	3	17/26		46
(New Zealand) Matthew Ridge (vc)	17	7	68/84	1	165
(Australia) Jim Serdaris	18 (1)				
(Australia) Neil Tierney	1 (19)				
(Australia) Geoff Toovey (c)	23	3			12
TOTAL		104	96/148	1	609

== Representative Players ==
=== International ===
- Australia – Mark Carroll, Daniel Gartner, Terry Hill, Nik Kosef, Steve Menzies, Geoff Toovey
- New Zealand – Matthew Ridge (c)

=== State ===
- New South Wales – Steve Menzies, Geoff Toovey
- Queensland – Owen Cunningham

=== City vs Country ===
- City Origin – Mark Carroll, Terry Hill, Steve Menzies, Geoff Toovey
