= 1997 State of Origin series =

Australian rugby league series

- Won by: New South Wales (8th title)
- Series margin: 2-1
- Points scored: 73
- Attendance: 86,568 (ave. 28,856 per match)
- Top points scorer(s): Julian O'Neill (12)
- Top try scorer(s): Andrew Johns (2)

The 1997 State of Origin series was the 16th year that the annual best-of-three series of interstate rugby league football matches between the Queensland and New South Wales representative teams was contested entirely under 'state of origin' selection rules. The 1995 State of Origin series, players from clubs aligned with Super League were not eligible for selection. Gone were players Laurie Daley, Allan Langer, Ricky Stuart, Wendell Sailor, Glenn Lazarus, Bradley Clyde, Gorden Tallis and Kevin Walters - all representing their respective states in the newly invented Super League Tri-series.

For the Australian Rugby League loyalists, young players in Andrew Johns, Matt Sing, Ben Ikin, Adrian Lam, Trent Barrett, Steve Menzies, and Robbie O'Davis all came of age in 1997.

They fought out against the backdrop of public disillusion, and a game bitterly divided due to the Super League war, making 1997's a dour series.

New South Wales brought in Tommy Raudonikis as coach who guided them to their fifth series win in six years on the back of the strong legacy left by Raudonikis' predecessor coach Phil Gould.

== Game I ==
Wednesday, 28 May 1997

Queensland	6–8	New South Wales
Adrian Lam(4 - 1t); Wayne Bartrim (2 - 1g)	(Report)	(4 - 1t) Paul McGregor (2 - 1g) Andrew Johns (2 - 1g) Rod Wishart

Suncorp Stadium, Brisbane
Attendance: 28,222
Referee: Kelvin Jeffes
Player of the Match: Geoff Toovey

Tommy Raudonikis' Blues gained the ascendency in game I - a match lacking the traditional early Origin intensity but which came alive in the second half as the prospect of a New South Wales triumph became reality. The Blues lead 8-0 at half-time after a try to Paul McGregor in the 31st minute and a goal each to Rod Wishart and Andrew Johns.

Injuries conspired against the visitors with McGregor, Wishart and Johns all forced from the field and sensing vulnerability the Maroons surged back. Queensland dominated the second-half but the Blues defence held out. Eventually weight of possession told and the Blues were cut to a 2-point lead when Maroons debutant Adrian Lam - a Papua New Guinean representative given dispensation to play Origin since 1995 - scored in the 68th minute.

New South Wales' brave and nuggety hooker Geoff Toovey lifted for the occasion and in the last ten minutes made a series of probing darts which kept the Maroons on the back foot and which earned him man-of-the-match honours and victory for the Blues.

== Game II ==
Wednesday, 11 June 1997

New South Wales	15–14	Queensland
Ken McGuinness (4 - 1t); Nik Kosef (4 - 1t); Jim Dymock (4 - 1t); John Simon (3 - 1g, 1fg)	(Report)	(4 - 1t) Matt Sing (4 - 1t) Robbie O'Davis (4 - 1t) Brett Dallas (2 - 1g) Julian O'Neill

Melbourne Cricket Ground, Melbourne
Attendance: 25,105
Referee: David Manson
Player of the Match: Paul McGregor

In the 50th State of Origin match played, New South Wales looked to have wrapped up Game II by racing to a 14-0 lead after just 27 minutes via tries to Ken McGuinness, Nik Kosef and Jim Dymock. However Queensland kept their cool and reduced the deficit to 14-10 at halftime with two tries in four minutes to Matt Sing and Robbie O'Davis.

The Maroons levelled the scores five minutes after the break when Brett Dallas broke a Jamie Ainscough tackle and crossed for 14-all. There were no further points in a classic tight contest until the 69th minute when Blues half John Simon landed a 26-metre field goal. The Queensland camp was left to rue a missed penalty attempt by Julian O'Neill in the dying minutes, presenting NSW victory and their fifth series win in six years.

== Game III ==
Game III was dead rubber with only pride and soul at stake for the Maroons who were facing their second consecutive whitewash.

Wednesday, 25 June 1997

Queensland	18–12	New South Wales
Julian O'Neill (10 - 1t, 3g); Ben Ikin (4 - 1t); Mark Coyne (4 - 1t)	(Report)	(6 - 1t,1g) Andrew Johns (4 - 1t) Jamie Ainscough (2 - 1g) John Simon

Sydney Football Stadium, Sydney
Attendance: 33,241
Referee: Eddie Ward
Player of the Match: Gary Larson

Queensland were outstanding on the night at the Blues' home ground and broke a five-game losing streak to win 18-12. Ben Ikin was the Maroons' hero, scoring a superb solo try after just four minutes and then firing a pass for Julian O'Neill to extend the Queensland lead to 12-0 at the 13-minute mark. New South Wales came back with tries to Ainscough and Johns but a Mark Coyne try sealed the victory for the Maroons.

With Queensland leading 6-0 following Ikin's try, there were a number of spiteful incidents. Queensland front rower Clinton O'Brien was all but knocked out attempting to tackle Blues prop Mark Carroll, while rival hookers Andrew Johns and Jamie Goddard also traded punches. Then from a scrum near half way, Carroll flattened replacement Maroons prop Craig Smith (who had only just come on for O'Brien), while Johns and Goddard continued their private war with Johns actually running around one of the touch judges to continue the fight, though the issue was soon put beyond doubt when Goddard landed a right hand that put the future rugby league Immortal on the deck and requiring stitches from a split lip. Referee Eddie Ward soon restored order to the game, penalising Carroll for the scrum blow up while sending both Johns and Goddard to the sin-bin, while Johns was also placed on report.

== New South Wales teams ==
Position	Game 1	Game 2	Game 3
Fullback	Tim Brasher		
Wing	Rod Wishart	Ken McGuinness	
Centre	Terry Hill		
Centre	Paul McGregor		Jamie Ainscough
Wing	Jamie Ainscough		Matt Seers
Five-eighth	Jim Dymock		Trent Barrett
Halfback	Geoff Toovey (c)	John Simon	Geoff Toovey (c)
Prop	Paul Harragon		
Hooker	Andrew Johns	Geoff Toovey (c)	Andrew Johns
Prop	Mark Carroll		
Second Row	Steve Menzies		
Second Row	Adam Muir		
Lock	Nik Kosef		
Interchange	David Fairleigh		
Interchange	Dean Pay		
Interchange	John Simon	Matt Seers	John Simon
Interchange	Ken McGuinness	Aaron Raper	Michael Buettner
Coach	Tommy Raudonikis		

== Queensland teams ==
Position	Game 1	Game 2	Game 3
Fullback	Robbie O'Davis		
Wing	Brett Dallas		
Centre	Matt Sing	Stuart Kelly	Mark Coyne
Centre	Mark Coyne		Julian O'Neill
Wing	Danny Moore	Matt Sing	
Five-eighth	Ben Ikin		
Halfback	Adrian Lam (c)		
Prop	Neil Tierney		Clinton O'Brien
Hooker	Jamie Goddard	Wayne Bartrim	Jamie Goddard
Prop	Craig Smith		Neil Tierney
Second Row	Gary Larson		
Second Row	Billy Moore	Jason Smith	
Lock	Wayne Bartrim	Billy Moore	
Interchange	Jason Smith	Jamie Goddard	Stuart Kelly
Interchange	Jeremy Schloss		
Interchange	Tony Hearn	Clinton O'Brien	Craig Smith
Interchange	Stuart Kelly	Julian O'Neill	Wayne Bartrim
Coach	Paul Vautin		

== See also ==
- Super League Tri-series
- 1997 ARL season

== Sources ==
- Big League's 25 Years of Origin Collectors' Edition, News Magazines, Surry Hills, Sydney
