= Seamus O'Connell =

Seamus O'Connell may refer to:

- Seamus O'Connell (footballer)
- Seamus O'Connell (rugby league)
