= Shane Wilson =

Shane Wilson may refer to:

- Shane Wilson (sculptor)
- Shane Wilson (racing)
- Shane Wilson (rugby league)
