= Clinton O'Brien =

Australian rugby league footballer

Personal information
- Full name: Clinton O'Brien
- Born: 10 January 1974 (age 51) Southport, Queensland, Australia

Playing information
- Position: Prop
Club
Years	Team	Pld	T	G	FG	P
1993–95	Eastern Suburbs	23	0	0	0	0
1996–97	South Queensland	30	1	0	0	4
1998	Gold Coast	18	0	0	0	0
1999–02	Newcastle Knights	59	3	0	0	12
2003	Wakefield Trinity Wildcats	4	0	0	0	0
	Total	134	4	0	0	16
Representative
Years	Team	Pld	T	G	FG	P
1997	Queensland	2	0	0	0	0

Clinton O'Brien (born 10 January 1974) is an Australian former professional rugby league footballer who played in the 1990s and 2000s. A Queensland State of Origin representative forward, he played club football in Australia for the Sydney Roosters, South Queensland Crushers, Gold Coast Chargers and Newcastle Knights (with whom he won the 2001 NRL premiership), as well as English club Wakefield Trinity Wildcats. O'Brein represented Queensland in the 1997 State of Origin series.

== Playing career ==
O'Brien made his first grade debut for Eastern Suburbs against St. George in round 12 of the 1993 NSWRL season.

In 1996, O'Brien joined South Queensland and the following year was selected to play from the interchange bench in Game 2 of the 1997 State of Origin series, then being selected to play prop forward in Game 3. Also in 1997 O'Brieb played in the South Queensland club's final ever game, a 39–18 victory over Western Suburbs. In 1998, O'Brien joined the Gold Coast and played in the club's final ever game which was a 20–18 defeat against Cronulla.

In 1999, O'Brien joined Newcastle. He played for the Newcastle Knights from the interchange bench in their shock 2001 NRL Grand Final victory over the Parramatta Eels. Having won the 2001 NRL Premiership, Newcastle travelled to England to play the 2002 World Club Challenge against Super League champions, the Bradford Bulls. O'Brien played at from the interchange bench in Newcastle's loss. O'Brien finished his career in Super League with English club, Wakefield Trinity.
