= Bill Bradstreet =

Australian rugby league footballer

Personal information
- Full name: William Bradstreet
- Born: 29 June 1945 (age 79); Sydney, New South Wales, Australia

Playing information
- Position: Lock, Prop
Club
Years	Team	Pld	T	G	FG	P
1964–73	Manly-Warringah	102	28	33	0	150
Representative
Years	Team	Pld	T	G	FG	P
1966	Australia	1	0	0	0	0
1966–67	New South Wales	4	0	0	0	0
1967	NSW City	0	0	0	0	0
1971	NSW Country	1	0	0	0	0
- Source: As of 4 April 2019
- Relatives: Darren Bradstreet (son)

Bill Bradstreet is an Australian former professional rugby league footballer who played in the 1960s and 1970s. He played for Manly-Warringah in the New South Wales Rugby League (NSWRL) competition. His father Fred Bradstreet played for North Sydney in the 1940s and his son Darren Bradstreet played for Illawarra Steelers in the 1990s.

== Playing career ==
Bradstreet made his first grade debut for Manly-Warringah in 1964. In 1966, Bradstreet was selected to play for Australia and featured in 1 test against Great Britain which Australia lost 17–13. Bradstreet was also selected to play for New South Wales in 1966 and played in 2 games against Queensland. In 1967, Bradstreet was selected to play for New South Wales and New South Wales City.

In 1968, Manly finished second on the table. Bradstreet played in the 1968 NSWRL grand final against South Sydney. Manly were appearing in their 4th grand final but were still in search of their first premiership. Manly had beaten Souths a fortnight earlier to reach the grand final but in the decider Souths defeated Manly 13–9. Early in the final, Bradstreet was flattened by a punch from Souths player Ron Coote during a play-the-ball incident.

In 1969, Manly finished in third place and reached the preliminary final before being defeated by eventual premiers Balmain with Bradstreet playing in that game from the bench.

In 1970, Manly reached the grand final and again the opponents were South Sydney but Manly were defeated losing 23–12. Bradstreet missed the match as he was not selected by coach Ron Willey.

In 1971, Bradstreet left Manly and captain-coached Port Kembla in the Illawarra competition where he was selected to play for NSW Country. Bradstreet returned to Manly in 1973 before retiring. In total, Bradstreet played 165 games for Manly in all grades.
