= Shannon Nevin =

Australian rugby league footballer (born 1976)

Personal information
- Full name: Shannon Nevin
- Born: 13 February 1976 (age 50) Sydney, New South Wales, Australia

Playing information
- Position: Fullback, Wing
Club
Years	Team	Pld	T	G	FG	P
1995–97	Manly Sea Eagles	29	6	52	0	128
1998–99	Balmain Tigers	31	0	69	0	139
	Total	60	6	121	0	267
- Source: As of 22 January 2019

Shannon Nevin (born 13 February 1976) is an Australian former professional rugby league footballer who played with the Manly-Warringah Sea Eagles and the Balmain Tigers in the National Rugby League (NRL) and its predecessor the Australian Rugby League (ARL).

== Career ==
=== Manly-Warringah ===
Nevin was born in Sydney, New South Wales and was a Manly Sea Eagles junior. A goal kicking fullback, Nevin was graded with the Sea Eagles but had to bide his time in Reserve Grade as Manly's first grade fullback at the time was New Zealand dual international custodian, the goal kicking Matthew Ridge.

Manly coach Bob Fulton gave Nevin his first grade debut from the bench for Manly in their 48–18 win over South Sydney at the Sydney Football Stadium (SFS) in the opening round of the 1995 ARL season. He then spent the next 11 weeks in reserve grade (during which the Sea Eagles first grade team did not lose a match), and was again on the bench for the Round 12 game against the North Sydney Bears at Brookvale Oval where he scored his first points in the top grade by kicking a goal. After spending the next three weeks in the reserves, he was called up for his first two games at fullback for the Sea Eagles when Ridge was unavailable due to representing New Zealand in a test series against France. Nevin played nine games for Manly in 1995 with his last game for the year in the clubs Qualifying final win over Cronulla. Manly, who had only lost two games for the entire season, would ultimately lose the Grand Final 17–4 to Sydney Bulldogs.

Nevin would again play nine games for Manly in the 1996 ARL season as the Sea Eagles made amends for the previous years disappointment by defeating St George 20–8 in the Grand Final at the SFS. He scored his first try in the top grade in Manly's 44-6 demolition of Souths in the opening round of the season.

Due to the Super League war, Ridge had signed with the Super League aligned Auckland Warriors and after his performances in 1995 and 1996, it was expected that Nevin would be an automatic selection at fullback for Manly in 1997. However, a poor pre-season and the signing of goal kicking Halfback Craig Field saw Fulton use experienced, former NSW Origin winger Craig Hancock as Manly's fullback for the first 11 rounds of the season. Nevin returned to first grade in Round 11 against Balmain when Danny Moore was unavailable after being selected to play State of Origin for Queensland and Fulton moved Hancock to his preferred wing spot. When Moore returned, so did Nevin to the bench where he spent the next two games as a fresh reserve before he once again found himself in the reserves. After Hancock broke his ankle in Round 17, Nevin was finally given the fullback spot and also took over the goal kicking duties from Field.

The defending NRL premiers qualified for their third Grand Final in succession, this time facing the Newcastle Knights who were playing their first Grand Final since entering the competition in 1988. Nevin was a try scorer on the day for the Sea Eagles, but with the scores tied at 16–16 with seconds remaining, Knights halfback Andrew Johns passed on the blind side to flying winger Darren Albert who sped past the Manly defence to score under the posts to give Newcastle an upset 22–16 win. It would prove to be Nevin's last game with the Sea Eagles as he would sign to play with Balmain in the 1998 NRL season.

In three seasons with Manly, Nevin played 29 games (including one Grand Final), scored 6 tries and kicked 52/83 goals (62.65%) for a total of 128 points.

=== Balmain ===
His first season at Leichhardt Oval saw Nevin cement his place as Balmain fullback and goal kicker. Nevin played 20 games for the struggling Tigers, kicking 51/79 goals as well as his first field goal.

His second season with Balmain was far less successful. The arrival of goal kicking fullback Joel Caine again saw Nevin playing mostly in reserve grade. He would only play 11 games for the year and at the end of the season was released by the club.

Nevin played 60 first grade games in his career for Manly and Balmain. He scored 6 tries, kicked 121/186 goals (65.05%) and kicked one field goal for a total of 267 points.

== Post career ==
In 2014, Nevin revealed in an interview that he had suffered at least 15 concussions during his career.

Nevin is currently the owner/operator of That Fitness Place, an independent, local gym and fitness centre, located in Seaforth on Sydney's Northern Beaches.
