= David Wonson =

Australian rugby league footballer

Personal information
- Full name: David Wonson

Playing information
- Position: Second-row
Club
| Years | Team | Pld | T | G | FG | P |
|---|---|---|---|---|---|---|
| 1991–93 | Illawarra Steelers | 5 | 0 | 0 | 0 | 0 |
| 1994 | Western Suburbs | 2 | 0 | 0 | 0 | 0 |
| | Total | 7 | 0 | 0 | 0 | 0 |
- Source: As of 23 December 2022

David Wonson is an Australian former professional rugby league footballer who played in the 1990s. He played for Western Suburbs and the Illawarra Steelers in the NSWRL competition.

== Playing career ==
Wonson made his first grade debut for Illawarra in round 19 of the 1991 NSWRL season against Cronulla-Sutherland at WIN Stadium. Wonson played off the interchange bench during a 44-6 victory. Wonson played a total of five games for Illawarra over a three year period. In 1994, Wonson joined Western Suburbs and made two appearances for the club but was released at the end of the season.
