= Troy Slattery =

Australian rugby league footballer

Personal information
- Born: 6 August 1973 (age 52)

Playing information
- Position: Five-eighth, Prop, Hooker, Second-row, Lock
Club
Years	Team	Pld	T	G	FG	P
1993–99	South Sydney	46	3	0	0	12
1999	Huddersfield Giants	3	1	0	0	4
2002–03	Wakefield Trinity Wildcats	38	4	0	0	16
	Total	87	8	0	0	32

Troy Slattery (born 6 August 1973) is a former professional rugby league footballer who played in the 1990s and 2000s. He played at club level for the South Sydney Rabbitohs, Huddersfield Giants, and the Wakefield Trinity Wildcats, as a five-eighth, prop, hooker, second-row, or lock.
