= Andrew Hinson =

Australian rugby league footballer

Personal information
- Born: 17 August 1976 (age 50)

Playing information
- Position: Centre, Wing
Club
Years	Team	Pld	T	G	FG	P
1996–01	Penrith Panthers	49	17	0	0	68
2002	South Sydney	5	3	0	0	12
	Total	54	20	0	0	80

Andrew Hinson (born 17 August 1976) is an Australian former professional rugby league footballer who played for the Penrith Panthers and South Sydney in the National Rugby League (NRL).

Hinson grew up in the Blue Mountains region, attending St Columba's Catholic College, Springwood.

From 1997 to 2001, he made 49 first-grade appearances for the Penrith Panthers in the NRL, playing primarily as winger for his first three seasons before shifting to centre. He retained the centre positions during his 2002 season with South Sydney, which conicided with the club's readmission to the competition.

Now based on the Sunshine Coast, Hinson has coached local club the Kawana Dolphins.
