= Adam Starr =

Australian rugby league footballer

Personal information
- Full name: Adam Starr
- Born: 15 February 1973 (age 53) Sydney, New South Wales, Australia

Playing information
- Position: Prop
Club
Years	Team	Pld	T	G	FG	P
1994–95	Eastern Suburbs	7	0	0	0	0
1996–99	Balmain Tigers	41	1	0	0	4
	Total	48	1	0	0	4
Representative
Years	Team	Pld	T	G	FG	P
2006	Queensland Residents	1	1	0	0	4
- Source: As of 8 January 2024

Adam Starr is an Australian former professional rugby league footballer who played in the 1990s. He played for the Balmain Tigers and Eastern Suburbs in the New South Wales Rugby League (NSWRL) competition, Australian Rugby League and NRL competitions.

== Playing career ==
Starr made his first grade debut for Eastern Suburbs in Round 15 1994 against Manly which ended in a 34–0 defeat. Starr played 2 seasons with Easts but could not establish himself in the team. In 1996, Starr joined Balmain who were briefly known at that time as the "Sydney Tigers".

In 1997, Balmain dropped the Sydney Tigers name and moved their home games back to Leichhardt Oval. Starr enjoyed his most consistent year in 1997 and made 21 appearances as Balmain missed out on the finals by only 1 competition point. Starr scored his only try in first grade during the 1997 season which was against Illawarra.

Starr played with Balmain up until the end of the 1999 season before the club elected to merge with Western Suburbs to form the Wests Tigers. Starr's final game for Balmain was against North Sydney in Round 13 1999 at North Sydney Oval which ended in a 64–12 defeat.

Starr then went on to play in France and for Redcliffe in the Queensland Cup competition. Starr initially retired at the end of 2006 but decided to return to the field and played with the Gympie Devils in the Sunshine Coast Gympie Rugby League competition. Starr retired for a second time at the end of 2012 following Gympie's grand final defeat against Kawana Dolphins.
