= Steve Topper =

Australian rugby league footballer

Personal information
- Full name: Steve Topper
- Born: 16 April 1961 (age 65) Sydney, New South Wales, Australia

Playing information
- Position: Halfback, Hooker
Club
Years	Team	Pld	T	G	FG	P
1979	South Sydney	7	0	0	0	0
1982–84	Illawarra Steelers	26	3	0	0	12
	Total	33	3	0	0	12
Representative
Years	Team	Pld	T	G	FG	P
1980	NSW Country	1	0	0	0	0
- Source: As of 26 February 2019

Steve Topper (born 16 April 1961) is an Australian former professional rugby league footballer who played in the 1970s and 1980s. Topper was a foundation player for Illawarra playing in the club's first game. Topper is the older brother of former Cronulla-Sutherland player Stuart Topper.

== Playing career ==
Topper made his first grade debut for Souths in Round 1 1979 against Newtown at Redfern Oval.

In 1980, Topper was selected to play for NSW Country against NSW City.

In 1982, Topper joined newly admitted Illawarra and played in the club's first ever game which was against Penrith at WIN Stadium and ended in a 17–7 loss.

Topper played with Illawarra until the end of the 1984 season before retiring.
