= Trevor Kissell =

Australian rugby league footballer

Personal information
- Full name: Trevor Kissell
- Born: 9 December 1964 (age 60)

Playing information
- Position: Five-eighth, Halfback
Club
Years	Team	Pld	T	G	FG	P
1985–93	Illawarra Steelers	72	9	0	0	36
- Source: As of 2 February 2023

Trevor Kissell is an Australian former professional rugby league footballer who played in the 1980s and 1990s. He played for Illawarra in the NSWRL competition.

== Playing career ==
Kissell made his first grade debut for Illawarra in round 21 of the 1985 NSWRL season against Manly at WIN Stadium. Kissell spent nine years at Illawarra mainly playing at five-eighth but also featuring at halfback. Kissell's time at the club was not particularly successful with the side finishing with Wooden Spoon's in 1985, 1986 and 1989.
