= Wayne McPherson =

Australian rugby league footballer

Personal information
- Full name: Wayne McPherson
- Born: 29 April 1961 (age 65) Sydney, New South Wales, Australia

Playing information
- Position: Fullback
Club
Years	Team	Pld	T	G	FG	P
1980	South Sydney	1	0	1	0	2
1983	Eastern Suburbs	3	2	0	0	8
1984–86	Illawarra Steelers	37	8	56	0	144
	Total	41	10	57	0	154
- Source: As of 3 February 2023

Wayne McPherson is a former Australian professional rugby league footballer who played in the 1980s. He represented South Sydney, Eastern Suburbs, and Illawarra in the NSWRL competition

== Playing career ==
McPherson made his first grade debut for South Sydney in round 5 of the 1980 NSWRFL season against Newtown at Redfern Oval. McPherson was contracted with South Sydney in 1981 and 1982 but only played for the reserve grade team. In 1983, he transferred to the clubs arch-rivals Eastern Suburbs. McPherson played three games for Easts including their fifth place playoff loss to St. George.

In 1984, McPherson joined Illawarra and spent majority of his playing time there in the fullback role. McPherson's three seasons at Illawarra were not particularly successful as the club finished with back to back Wooden Spoon's in 1985 and 1986.
