= Mathew Guberina =

Australian rugby league footballer

Personal information
- Full name: Mathew Guberina
- Born: 31 March 1971 (age 53); Sydney, New South Wales, Australia

Playing information
- Position: Prop
Club
Years	Team	Pld	T	G	FG	P
1995–97	Manly Sea Eagles	6	0	0	0	0
- Source: As of 25 January 2023

Mathew Guberina is an Australian former professional rugby league footballer who played in the 1990s. He played for Manly-Warringah in the ARL competition.

== Playing career ==
Before joining Manly, Guberina played for the Warringah Rugby Club. He has the distinction of being the first rugby player to ever be sent to the sin bin. The sin bin was introduced at the start of the 1994 season and Mathew was sent off during Round 1 vs. Eastwood.

In round 7 of the 1995 ARL season, he made his first grade debut against North Queensland at the Willows Sports Complex. Guberina played a total of three years at Manly with each season seeing the club winning the Minor Premiership and claiming the 1996 premiership defeating St. George in the grand final.
