= Steve Worthington =

Australian rugby league footballer

Personal information
- Full name: Steven Worthington
- Born: 3 August 1964 (age 60)

Playing information
- Position: Second-row, Lock, Prop
Club
Years	Team	Pld	T	G	FG	P
1984–88	Illawarra Steelers	80	11	0	0	44
- Source: As of 6 February 2023

Steve Worthington is an Australian former professional rugby league footballer who played in the 1980s. He played for Illawarra in the New South Wales Rugby League (NSWRL) competition.

== Playing career ==
Worthington made his first grade debut in round 3 of the 1984 NSWRL season against Canterbury at Belmore Sports Ground. Worthington would go on to become a consistent member of the Illawarra side over the next five years playing 80 matches. However, his time at the club was not particularly successful with Illawarra claiming two Wooden Spoon's in 1985 and 1986.
