= Shaun Walliss =

Australian rugby league footballer

Personal information
- Full name: Shaun Walliss
- Born: 8 February 1972 (age 54)

Playing information
- Position: Second-row, Prop
Club
Years	Team	Pld	T	G	FG	P
1993	Illawarra Steelers	5	0	0	0	0
1995–96	South Sydney	7	0	0	0	0
1997	Western Suburbs	1	0	0	0	0
	Total	13	0	0	0	0
- Source: As of 21 December 2022

Shaun Walliss is an Australian former professional rugby league footballer who played in the 1990s. He played for Western Suburbs, the Illawarra Steelers and South Sydney in the NSWRL/ARL competition.

== Playing career ==
Walliss made his first grade debut for Illawarra in round 17 of the 1993 NSWRL season against the Gold Coast Seagulls. Walliss came off the interchange bench in a 26-0 victory at WIN Stadium. In 1995, Walliss joined South Sydney. He played two seasons with Souths before switching to Western Suburbs ahead of the 1997 ARL season. Walliss played one match for Western Suburbs which was in round 1 of the 1997 season against the Gold Coast Chargers.
