= Neil Tierney =

Australian rugby league footballer

Personal information
- Full name: Neil Joseph Tierney
- Born: 22 October 1967 (age 58) Brisbane, Queensland, Australia

Playing information
- Height: 189 cm (6 ft 2 in)
- Weight: 118 kg (18 st 8 lb)
- Position: Prop
Club
Years	Team	Pld	T	G	FG	P
1990–93	St. George Dragons	57	1	0	0	4
1994–95	Western Suburbs	19	2	0	0	8
1996–99	Manly Sea Eagles	77	1	0	0	8
	Total	153	4	0	0	20
Representative
Years	Team	Pld	T	G	FG	P
1997	Queensland	3	0	0	0	0

Neil Tierney (born 22 October 1967) is an Australian former rugby league footballer who played in the 1980s and 1990s.

== Playing career ==
A prop forward, he started his football career in Queensland with the Wynnum-Manly club, winning the Brisbane Rugby League premiership's Rothmans Medal for best and fairest of the 1989 season. The following season Tierney moved to Sydney to play in the New South Wales Rugby League premiership with the St. George Dragons.

He spent four seasons there, then another two with the Western Suburbs Magpies before settling at the Manly Warringah Sea Eagles. Tierney played for the Sea Eagles in the 1996 season's grand final win and the following year's split competition was selected to play in Paul Vautin's Maroons in the 1997 State of Origin series.

At the end of the 1997 ARL season, he played in his second consecutive grand final for Manly, which was lost to the Newcastle Knights.

Tierney played with Manly up until the end of the 1999 NRL season before the club controversially merged with arch rivals North Sydney to form the Northern Eagles as part of the NRL's rationalization policy. Tierney played in what was then Manly's final game before the merger, which was a 20-18 loss against St George at WIN Stadium. He was not offered a contract with the new joint venture club and subsequently retired at the conclusion of the 1999 season.
