= Michael Gillett =

Australian rugby league footballer

Personal information
- Full name: Michael Gillett
- Born: 10 April 1973 (age 53) Wentworthville, New South Wales, Australia
- Height: 6 ft 2 in (1.88 m)
- Weight: 13 st 12 lb (88 kg)

Playing information
- Position: Fullback, Five-eighth, Halfback, Centre
Club
| Years | Team | Pld | T | G | FG | P |
|---|---|---|---|---|---|---|
| 1993 | Penrith Panthers | 3 | 0 | 0 | 0 | 0 |
| 1994–99 | Balmain | 95 | 18 | 0 | 1 | 73 |
| 2000 | Wests Tigers | 14 | 4 | 0 | 0 | 16 |
| 2001–02 | London Broncos | 48 | 15 | 2 | 0 | 64 |
| | Total | 160 | 37 | 2 | 1 | 153 |
- Source: As of 15 January 2019

Michael Gillett (/ˈdʒəlɛt/) (born 10 April 1973) is an Australian former professional rugby league footballer who played in the 1990s and 2000s. Gillett played for the London Broncos in the Super League and also for the Wests Tigers, the Balmain Tigers and the Penrith Panthers in Australia.

== Background ==
Gillett was born in Wentworthville, New South Wales, Australia.

== Playing career ==
Gillett made his first grade debut for Penrith in Round 7 of the 1993 season against Cronulla. In 1994, Gillett joined Balmain and in his first season at the club they finished last on the table claiming the wooden spoon.

Gillett played with Balmain until the end of 1999, after which they merged with Western Suburbs to form the Wests Tigers. Gillett was one of the few players signed on from Balmain for the following season to play for the new club. Gillett played 1 season with Wests Tigers before signing with English club the London Broncos. Gillett spent 2 seasons with London before retiring from rugby league at the end of 2002.
