= Greg Clarke (rugby league) =

Australian rugby league footballer

Personal information
- Full name: Greg Clarke
- Born: 31 May 1973 (age 51)

Playing information
- Position: Wing
Club
| Years | Team | Pld | T | G | FG | P |
|---|---|---|---|---|---|---|
| 1993–94 | Illawarra Steelers | 4 | 0 | 0 | 0 | 0 |
| 1995–96 | South Sydney | 13 | 2 | 0 | 0 | 8 |
| 1997 | Halifax Blue Sox | 3 | 0 | 0 | 0 | 0 |
| | Total | 20 | 2 | 0 | 0 | 8 |
- Source: As of 2 February 2023

Greg Clarke is an Australian former professional rugby league footballer who played in the 1990s. He played for Illawarra and South Sydney in the NSWRL/ARL competition. Clarke also played for Halifax in the Super League

== Playing career ==
Clarke made his first grade debut for Illawarra in round 18 of the 1993 NSWRL season against Manly at Brookvale Oval. Clarke would make four appearances for Illawarra over two seasons. In 1995, he joined South Sydney and played 13 games for the club before departing at the end of the 1996 season. In 1997, he joined Super League side Halifax where he played three games.
