= Seamus O'Connell (rugby league) =

Australian rugby league footballer

Personal information
- Full name: Seamus O'Connell
- Born: 10 July 1961 (age 63)

Playing information
- Position: Prop, Second-row
Club
Years	Team	Pld	T	G	FG	P
1983–84	Eastern Suburbs	22	0	0	0	0
1985–86	Illawarra Steelers	21	2	0	0	8
1987–88	St. George Dragons	18	0	0	0	0
	Total	61	2	0	0	8
- Source: As of 10 February 2023

Seamus O'Connell is an Australian former professional rugby league footballer who played in the 1980s. He played for St. George, Illawarra Steelers and Eastern Suburbs in the New South Wales Rugby League (NSWRL) competition.

== Playing career ==
O'Connell made his first grade debut for Eastern Suburbs in round 1 of the 1983 NSWRFL season against Western Suburbs at Sydney Sports Ground. After making 22 appearances for Easts, O'Connell departed the club and signed for Illawarra. O'Connell's two years at Illawarra were not successful with the club finishing with back to back Wooden Spoon's. In 1987, O'Connell joined St. George and played 18 games for the club mainly as a prop before being released at the end of 1988.
