= Stuart Kelly (rugby league) =

Australian rugby league footballer

Personal information
- Full name: Stuart Kelly
- Born: 4 February 1976 (age 49); Tarom, Queensland, Australia

Playing information
- Height: 180 cm (5 ft 11 in)
- Weight: 91 kg (201 lb; 14 st 5 lb)
- Position: Wing, Centre
Club
Years	Team	Pld	T	G	FG	P
1995	Gold Coast	4	0	0	0	0
1996–00	Parramatta Eels	96	29	0	0	116
2001–04	Brisbane Broncos	82	21	0	0	84
	Total	182	50	0	0	200
Representative
Years	Team	Pld	T	G	FG	P
1997	Queensland	3	0	0	0	0

Stuart Kelly (born 4 February 1976) is an Australian former rugby league footballer who played in the 1990s and 2000s. He played for the Gold Coast Seagulls, Parramatta Eels and the Brisbane Broncos in the Australian first grade premiership competition. His position of choice was usually at centre or wing. Kelly was a member of The Parramatta side's that made 3 preliminary finals in a row but ultimately fell short of a grand final appearance.

== Background ==
Kelly was born in Taroom, Queensland.

== Playing career ==
Kelly made his first grade debut for the Gold Coast in Round 18 1995 against St George which ended in a 46-16 loss. In 1996, Kelly joined Parramatta and became a regular fixture in the team over the next 5 years.

In 1998, Kelly played in all but 1 of the club's matches as they finished 4th on the table and qualified for the finals. Kelly played in all of Parramatta's finals games including the heartbreaking preliminary final loss against Canterbury-Bankstown.

With Parramatta leading 18-2 with less than 10 minutes to play, Canterbury staged a comeback scoring 3 tries in 8 minutes with Canterbury player Daryl Halligan kicking 2 goals from the sideline to tie the game at 18-18. Parramatta player Paul Carige then made a series of personal errors which cost Parramatta dearly in extra time with Canterbury going on to win 32-20.

In 1999, Parramatta finished 2nd and qualified for the finals again. Parramatta once more reached the preliminary final against Melbourne. Parramatta lead the match 16-0 at halftime before a second half capitulation occurred similar to the year earlier with Melbourne winning the game 18-16.

In 2000, Kelly played 28 games as Parramatta reached their 3rd straight preliminary final against Brisbane. That season, the club was dubbed the "Baby Eels" by the media with the average of the squad being 23 years old. Parramatta lost the match 16-10 against the eventual premiers. This in turn would prove to be Kelly's last match for Parramatta and he joined Brisbane for the 2001 season.

Having won the 2000 NRL Premiership, the Broncos travelled to England to play against 2000's Super League V Champions, St Helens R.F.C. for the 2001 World Club Challenge, with Kelly playing at centre in Brisbane's loss.

In 2001, Kelly played in 16 matches for Brisbane as they reached the preliminary final against his former side Parramatta. Brisbane lost the match 24-16. Kelly played with Brisbane up until the end of 2005 before retiring. Kelly's last match in first grade was against Canberra in Round 14 2005.
