= Craig Hancock =

Australian rugby league footballer (born 1969)

Personal information
- Born: 10 June 1969 (age 57)

Playing information
- Height: 185 cm (6 ft 1 in)
- Weight: 91 kg (14 st 5 lb)
- Position: Wing, Fullback
Club
Years	Team	Pld	T	G	FG	P
1989–98	Manly Sea Eagles	172	64	0	0	256
1999	Balmain Tigers	20	6	0	0	24
	Total	192	70	0	0	280
Representative
Years	Team	Pld	T	G	FG	P
1995	New South Wales	1	0	0	0	0
- Source: RL stats

Craig Hancock (born 10 June 1969) is an Australian former professional rugby league footballer. With his natural pace, "Hank" Hancock mostly played as a winger, though he also played a number of games at fullback, he played club football for the Manly-Warringah Sea Eagles and Balmain Tigers. He played one game for New South Wales in the State of Origin.

== Playing career ==
=== Manly-Warringah ===
Hancock made his debut for Manly in Round 3 of the 1989 season against the Newcastle Knights at the Knights home ground, Marathon Stadium. For the next 10 years he was a regular player for the Sea Eagles, playing at the end of their backline.

He was selected to represent New South Wales as a winger for game I of the 1995 State of Origin series.

Matthew Ridge, Manly's fullback since 1990, had signed with Super league in 1995 and was off to the Auckland Warriors in 1997. Manly coach Bob Fulton moved Hancock to fullback for the season as a replacement for Ridge until the Round 17 match with Parramatta at Brookvale Oval where Hancock broke his ankle thus ending his season and causing him to miss the Sea Eagles 3rd Grand Final in succession where they were defeated by Newcastle Knights.

With Grand Final fullback Shannon Nevin moving to Balmain, Hancock was moved back to his preferred wing position in 1998 after the club signed goal-kicking fullback Luke Phillips from the North Queensland Cowboys. In a frustrating season, Manly's form of the previous 3 seasons dropped alarmingly and the club only scrapped into the finals in 10th place before being eliminated by Canberra in the Qualifying Finals with Hancock floating between the wing, fullback, and bench, scoring only 4 tries for the year. Following the 1998 NRL season, Hancock, after 10 seasons, 172 games and 64 tries for Manly, signed to play for the Balmain Tigers in 1999.

=== Balmain ===
Hancock played 20 games for Balmain during 1999, adding a further 7 tries to his career total. Hancock played in Balmain's final game as a stand-alone entity which was against the Canberra Raiders at Bruce Stadium in Round 26 1999. Balmain lost the match 42–14.

Following the end of the 1999 season, Balmain and Western Suburbs entered into a merger to become the Wests Tigers and Hancock, after 192 senior games for Manly and Balmain as well as state of Origin selection for NSW in 1995 and the 1996 premiership, retired from rugby league at the age of 30.

=== Highlights ===
- First Grade Debut: 1989 – Round 3, Manly vs Newcastle Knights at Marathon Stadium, 2 April
- Representative Selection: 1995 – State of Origin Game 1, 15 May, at the Sydney Football Stadium.
- Premierships: 1996 – member of the Manly premiership winning team that defeated St. George Dragons, 20–8
