= Laloa Milford =

Samoan rugby league and rugby union footballer (born 1976)

Laloaoa Milford
Personal information
- Full name: Laloa Milford
- Born: 20 September 1976 (age 49) Western Samoa
- Height: 1.77 m (5 ft 9 1/2 in)
- Weight: 83 kg (13 st 1 lb)

Playing information

Rugby league
- Position: Fullback, Wing
Club
Years	Team	Pld	T	G	FG	P
1996–99	Balmain Tigers	38	18	0	0	72
2000	Wests Tigers	1	1	0	0	4
2001–03	Pia Donkeys
2003	Cronulla Sharks	13	2	0	0	8
	Total	52	21	0	0	84
Representative
Years	Team	Pld	T	G	FG	P
2000	Samoa	4	3	0	0	12

Rugby union
- Position: Wing, Centre
Club
Years	Team	Pld	T	G	FG	P
2004–05	Aviron Bayonnais
2005–06	Castres Olympique
	Total	0	0	0	0	0

Laloa Milford is a Samoan former professional rugby league and rugby union footballer who played in the 1990s and 2000s. He most recently played rugby union for the Santa Monica Rugby Club. He was hired as the head coach for the University of Southern California Rugby Club in August, 2015. He represented Samoa.

== Rugby league career ==
Milford started his career with the Sydney Tigers in 1996. Milford made his first grade debut for the club in Round 19 1996 against Manly-Warringah which ended in a 18-0 loss at Brookvale Oval.

At the end of 1996, Balmain dropped the "Sydney Tigers" name and reverted to their original name. The club also returned to Leichhardt Oval after spending 2 seasons at Parramatta Stadium.

Milford played 38 games for the club between 1996 and 1999. Milford played in Balmain's final game as a stand-alone entity which was against the Canberra Raiders at Bruce Stadium in Round 26 1999. Balmain lost the match 42-14.

In 2000, he joined the squad of the merged Wests Tigers club, but only played in one first grade match.

Between 2001 and 2003 Milford played for the Pia Donkeys, and in 2001 he played in the final of the Lord Derby Cup.

In 2002, Milford played for the Cabramatta Two Blues in the Jim Beam Cup.

In 2003, he returned to the National Rugby League, playing for the Cronulla-Sutherland Sharks. Milford's final game in the top grade came in Round 19 2003 which was against the New Zealand Warriors at Shark Park. Cronulla lost the match 31-24.

== Representative career ==
Milford played for Samoa in the 2000 World Cup.

== Rugby union career ==
Milford went to France in 2004, signing for rugby union club, Aviron Bayonnais. In 2005 he joined Castres Olympique.
