= Paul McBlane =

Australian rugby league referee

Personal information
- Died: 31 January 2017 (aged 53)

Refereeing information
Years	Competition	Apps
1994–99	NSWRL/NRL	97
1996	City vs Country Origin	1

Paul Douglas McBlane (died 31 January 2017) was an Australian rugby league referee who officiated in the NRL and other first-grade competitions.

McBlane started his first grade career in 1994 in the New South Wales Rugby League premiership. In 1996, in the midst of the Super League war, he was accused of bias against the breakaway teams. He controlled the City vs Country Origin match that year.

In all, he officiated 97 first grade matches (6 NSWRL games, 55 ARL and 36 in the NRL). McBlane was one of the original referees of the new National Rugby League competition in 1998, becoming referee number 10.

== Death ==
McBlane died of a heart attack in his sleep on 31 January 2017, aged 53. He had been preparing to be married at the time of his death.
