= Shane Wilson (rugby league) =

Australian rugby league footballer

Personal information
- Born: 27 April 1972 (age 52)

Playing information
- Position: Centre
Club
| Years | Team | Pld | T | G | FG | P |
|---|---|---|---|---|---|---|
| 1991–92 | Illawarra Steelers | 7 | 0 | 0 | 0 | 0 |
| 1993–97 | South Sydney | 64 | 19 | 19 | 0 | 114 |
| 1998 | Widnes | 2 | 0 | 0 | 0 | 0 |
| | Total | 73 | 19 | 19 | 0 | 114 |

Shane Wilson (born 27 April 1972) is an Australian former professional rugby league footballer who played for the Illawarra Steelers and the South Sydney Rabbitohs. Wilson also played in England for Widnes.

== Playing career ==
Wilson, who played predominantly as a centre, started his NSWRL career at Illawarra in 1991. After two seasons he moved to South Sydney and made 64 premiership appearances over five years at his new club. Wilson played for Souths in their upset 1994 Tooheys Challenge Cup final victory over Brisbane.

He finished his professional rugby league career in England, playing for Widnes in 1998.
