= Wayne Clifford (rugby league) =

Australian rugby league footballer

Personal information
- Full name: Wayne Clifford
- Born: 24 May 1975 (age 49)

Playing information
- Position: Wing
Club
Years	Team	Pld	T	G	FG	P
1996–98	Illawarra Steelers	41	20	0	0	80
- Source: As of 1 February 2023

Wayne Clifford is an Australian former professional rugby league footballer who played in the 1990s. He played for Illawarra in the ARL and NRL competitions.

== Playing career ==
Clifford made his first-grade debut for Illawarra in round 6 of the 1996 ARL season against South Queensland at WIN Stadium. In the 1997 ARL season, Clifford played 23 matches and finished as Illawarra's top try scorer with 14 tries as the club qualified for the second finals series. Clifford played in Illawarra's elimination finals loss to the Gold Coast Chargers.

In the 1998 NRL season, Clifford played 12 matches in what would be Illawarra's final year in the competition. At the end of the season, Illawarra formed a joint-venture with St. George to form St. George Illawarra. No contract was made available to Clifford to join the new team.
