= Andrew Purcell =

Scotland international rugby league footballer

Personal information
- Full name: Andrew Purcell
- Born: 20 May 1971 (age 55) Australia

Playing information
- Position: Stand-off, Hooker, Prop, Second-row
Club
Years	Team	Pld	T	G	FG	P
1994–95	Swinton Lions		2	0	0	8
1996–98	Illawarra Steelers	26	4	0	0	16
1999	Hull FC	27	4	0	0	16
2000	Castleford Tigers	22	4	0	0	16
	Total	75	14	0	0	56
Representative
Years	Team	Pld	T	G	FG	P
2000	Scotland	2	0	0	0	0
- As of 3 February 2021

Andrew Purcell (born 20 May 1971) is a former Scotland international rugby league footballer from Australia who played as a stand-off, hooker, prop, second-row or loose forward in the 1990s and 2000s. He played at representative level for Scotland, and at club level for the Swinton Lions, Illawarra Steelers, Hull FC and the Castleford Tigers.

== Playing career ==
Purcell played at the 2000 Rugby League World Cup.
