= Terry Lamey =

Australian rugby league footballer

Personal information
- Born: 7 January 1977 (age 49) Port Kembla, New South Wales, Australia

Playing information
- Position: Second-row, Lock
Club
Years	Team	Pld	T	G	FG	P
1997–98	Illawarra Steelers	34	2	0	0	8
1999–00	St George Illawarra	16	1	0	0	4
2002	South Sydney	2	0	0	0	0
	Total	52	3	0	0	12

Terry Lamey (born 7 January 1977) is an Australian former professional rugby league footballer who played in the late 1990s an early 2000s.

== Playing career ==
Lamey played for the Illawarra Steelers for two seasons between 1997 and 1998, St. George Illawarra Dragons for two seasons between 1999-2000 and one season at South Sydney in 2002.

Lamey played in Illawarra's final ever game in the top grade which was against Canterbury-Bankstown in Round 24 1998 which ended in a 25–24 loss at WIN Stadium. Lamey made only 1 appearance for St George in 1999 and did not play in the club's 1999 grand final defeat. In 2002, Lamey joined South Sydney who had just been re-admitted to the competition. Lamey only played 2 games for Souths and retired at the end of the 2002 season.
