= Trent Barrett =

Australian RL coach and former Australia international rugby league footballer

Personal information
- Full name: Trent Barrett
- Born: 18 November 1977 (age 49) Temora, New South Wales, Australia
- Height: 183 cm (6 ft 0 in)
- Weight: 94 kg (14 st 11 lb)

Playing information
- Position: Five-eighth, Halfback
Club
Years	Team	Pld	T	G	FG	P
1996–98	Illawarra Steelers	45	30	0	2	122
1999–06	St. George Illawarra	154	47	0	5	193
2007–08	Wigan Warriors	60	26	0	5	109
2009–10	Cronulla Sharks	36	5	0	3	23
	Total	295	108	0	15	447
Representative
Years	Team	Pld	T	G	FG	P
2003–05	Country Origin	2	2	0	0	8
1997–10	New South Wales	11	3	0	1	13
1997–05	Australia	15	7	0	0	28

Coaching information
Club
Years	Team	Gms	W	D	L	W%
2016–18	Manly Sea Eagles	73	29	0	44	40
2021–22	Canterbury Bulldogs	34	5	0	29	15
2024	Parramatta Eels	14	4	0	10	29
	Total	121	38	0	83	31
Representative
Years	Team	Gms	W	D	L	W%
2012–15	Country Origin	4	2	1	1	50
2014–16	Italy	1	1	0	0	100
- Source: As of 27 May 2024

Trent Barrett (born 18 November 1977) is an Australian professional rugby league football coach who is currently the assistant coach of the Brisbane Broncos and a former professional rugby league footballer who played in the 1990s, 2000s and 2010s.

He was previously the head coach of the Manly-Warringah Sea Eagles and Canterbury-Bankstown Bulldogs in the National Rugby League (NRL). A former Australia international and New South Wales State of Origin representative five-eighth, he played during the 1990s and 2000s for the Illawarra Steelers before they formed a joint venture with St. George to create the St. George Illawarra Dragons, with whom he won the 2000 Dally M Medal. Barrett also had a two-season spell in the Super League with England's Wigan and was named in 2007's Super League Dream Team before finishing his career back in Australia with the Cronulla-Sutherland Sharks. After co-coaching the St George Illawarra under 20s side and coaching the Country New South Wales rugby league team for four seasons Barrett started coaching in the NRL with the Sea Eagles.

== Background ==
Barrett was born in Temora, New South Wales on 18 November 1977. He is a cousin of Australian rules footballers Luke Breust and Jake Barrett, NRL footballer Liam Martin and Australian water polo player Anthony Martin.

While attending St Gregory's College, Campbelltown, he played for the Australian Schoolboys team in 1995.

On 14 May 2026 Barrett's 17 year old daughter Halle Barrett signed an NRLW contract with the St George Illawarra Dragons.

== Playing career ==
=== 1990s ===
Barrett started his professional career in the 1996 ARL season with the Illawarra Steelers.

Within two years he had been selected to play his first State of Origin match.

Barrett was the stand-out player of the 1998 Illawarra Steelers season, top scoring with 18 tries and winning the BHP Medal as player of the year.

His first season at the new joint-venture of the St. George Illawarra Dragons was marred by controversy as the incessant media hype over an alleged feud with Anthony Mundine and whether by playing out of position at half-back was affecting his form. He played at halfback in St. George Illawarra's 1999 NRL Grand Final loss to Melbourne.

=== 2000s ===
With the shock departure of Mundine from St. George Illawarra in 2000, Barrett was allowed to move back to his original position of five-eighth and he received the Dally M Medal in 2000.

At the end of the 2001 NRL season, he went on the 2001 Kangaroo tour.

He scored 6 tries in 20 games in the 2002 NRL season.

In 2003, while Barrett was captain of St George Illawarra, Nathan Brown who was the coach at the time famously slapped Barrett across the face in a tense sideline spray alongside Lance Thompson. Brown admitted many years later it was one of the biggest regrets in his coaching career but said he had moved on from the incident.

Following a Round 12, 2006 game against the Newcastle Knights, Barrett received a grade-five striking charge on Newcastle Knights' Brian Carney. The incident initially went unnoticed throughout the entire weekend but it is understood a Channel Nine producer picked up the incident. Barrett was suspended for six matches, ruling him out of Dally M Medal contention.

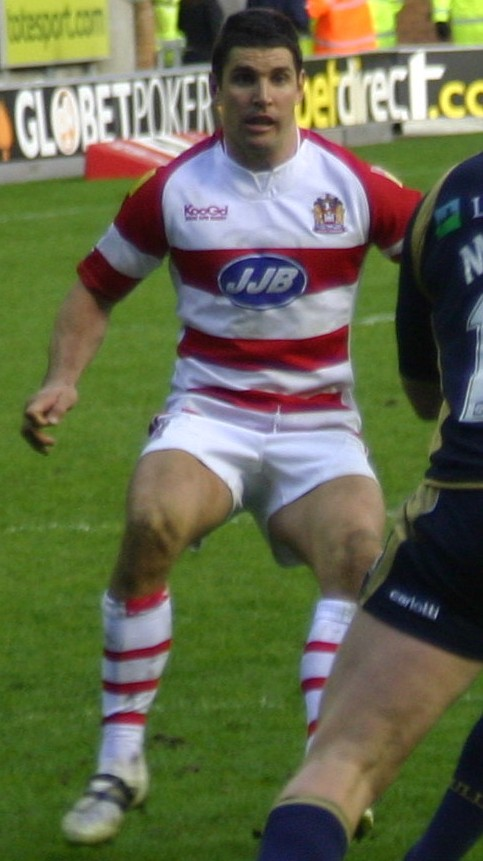
Barrett playing for Wigan in 2008

Barrett had two years left on his St. George Illawarra Dragons contract, but a get-out clause enabled him to quit the club for a move to England. He signed a three-year deal with the Wigan Warriors on 4 May 2006, despite their position at the bottom of the Super League and the threat of relegation to National League Division 1.

Barrett made his Wigan Warriors début in a 16–10 defeat against Warrington at the JJB Stadium on 9 February 2007. In October 2007, Barrett was named as the Rugby League Players' Player of the Year but missed out on the "Man of Steel" although he had been tipped to be named. James Roby of St Helens received the award.

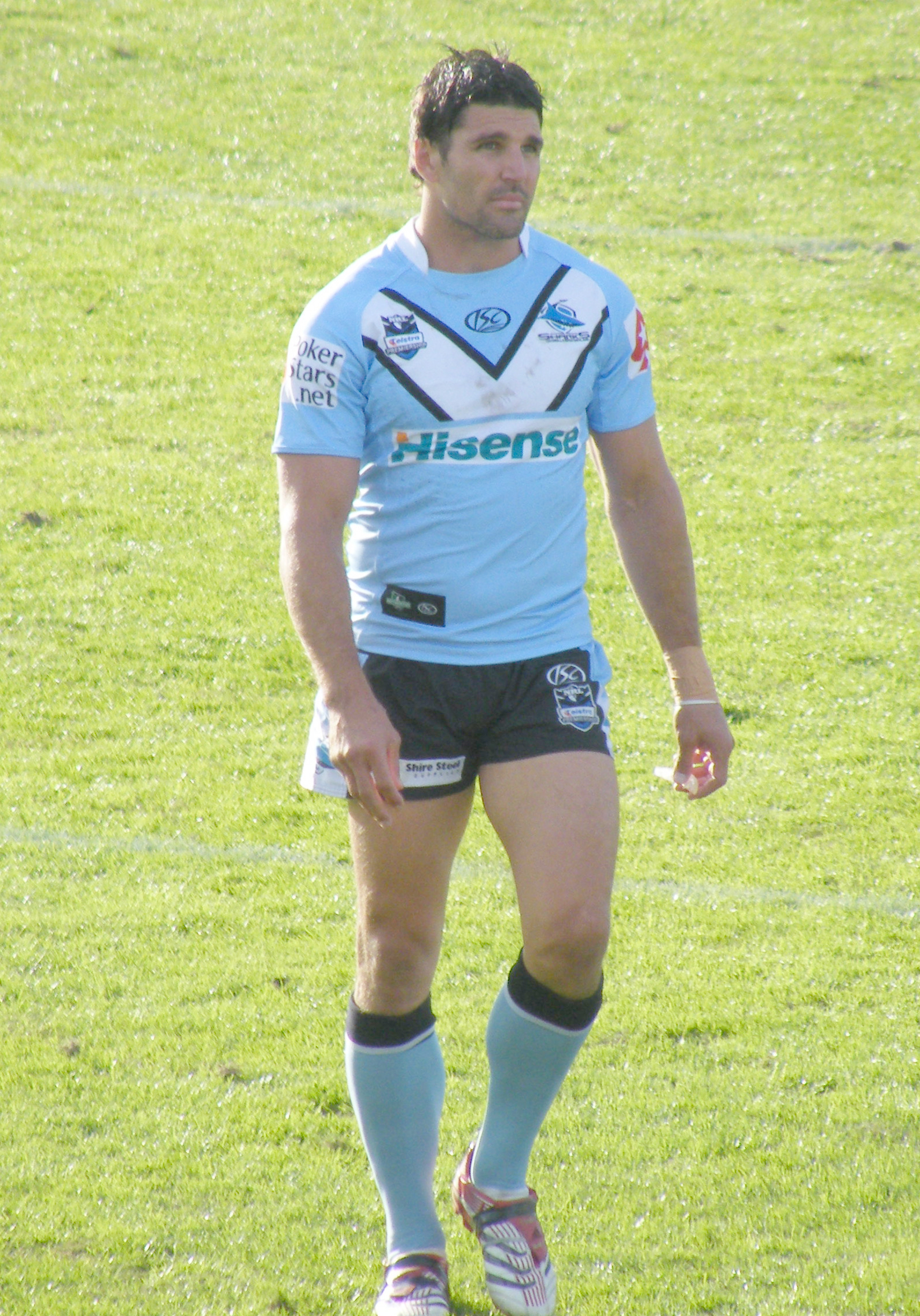
Barrett playing for the Sharks in 2010

Following a release from the final year of his three-year contract with Wigan, Barrett signed with the Cronulla-Sutherland Sharks in June 2008, on a two-year deal, commencing in 2009.

He earned the five-eighth spot for the New South Wales team in the 2nd State of Origin match of 2009. In his Origin comeback, Barrett was charged following a reckless tackle on Queensland's Greg Inglis, and as a result was suspended for two club matches. It did not, however, deter him from playing in the third and final Origin match in which he set up several tries as New South Wales defeated Queensland in the dead rubber, Queensland having won the series with victory three weeks prior. Barrett announced his retirement on 22 July 2010.

=== Representative games ===
- "Club:" Played 199 games for the Illawarra Steelers and the St George Illawarra Dragons
- Country: Played for Country in City vs Country Origin
- State of Origin: Played 11 games in total for New South Wales
- International: Played 13 tests to date for Australia including the 2000 World Cup

=== Awards ===
- Dally M: Dally M Player of the Year in 2000
- Super League Players' Player of the Year 2007

== Coaching career ==
On 5 April 2014, Barrett was announced as the new head coach of the Italian national rugby league team when previous coach Carlo Napolitano announced his departure after Italy's 2013 Rugby League World Cup campaign. He coached Italy in their World Cup Qualifying matches, while Paul Broadbent coached Italy in the minor European Championship competitions.

In 2016, Barrett became the head coach for Manly-Warringah Sea Eagles. In Barrett's first season as Manly coach the club finished 13th on the table and missed the finals. The following season, Barrett took Manly to a 6th-place finish on the table and qualified for the finals but were eliminated in controversial circumstances against Penrith in week one of the finals.

In 2018, Manly and Barrett suffered a horror year on and off the field with the club finishing second last and narrowly avoiding the wooden spoon. The club was also plagued with infighting and there were reported disagreements between Barrett and the Manly owners over lack of chairs and whose responsibility it was to provide them. Trent eventually supplied the chairs himself but the effort was too late to save the season.

On 22 October 2018, Manly announced that former two-time premiership-winning coach Des Hasler would be appointed as the new Manly head coach for 2019 despite the fact that Barrett still had 12 months remaining on his contract and was not officially terminated by the club.

On 6 August 2019, Barrett spoke to the media and said that in some way he deserved credit for Manly's form reversal in 2019 which saw the club go from finishing second last in 2018 to contenders the following season. Barrett said "I’d actually like to think I left them well-educated, A few of the boys I got there like Siro (Curtis Sironen) were coming out of reserve grade, No one else wanted Moses Suli. He’d been punted by the Wests Tigers and the Bulldogs, Tommy Turbo had only played five games when I started".

Barrett's comments were later slammed online by the daughter of Bob Fulton, Kirstie Fulton took to Facebook and wrote "History will not be rewritten, no way. I sit back and watch and read people take credit for many things and it’s hard to digest at times because I know who has been and continues to be instrumental in driving a lot of the change behind the scenes but I won’t accept this at all. Is he kidding? His arrogance and ego nearly tore the place apart".

On 16 August 2019, it was announced that Barrett would be returning to Penrith as assistant coach to Ivan Cleary beginning in 2020.

On 23 July 2020, it was announced that Barrett would be the head coach of Canterbury-Bankstown from 2021 onwards on a three-year deal. Barrett began his head coaching role with an opening round defeat against Newcastle. In round 2 & 3 of the 2021 NRL season, Canterbury were kept scoreless by Penrith and Brisbane losing 28-0 and 24-0 respectively. This was the first time in the club's history they had been held scoreless in consecutive games.

In round 4 of the 2021 NRL season, Canterbury were defeated 38-0 by the South Sydney Rabbitohs in the traditional Good Friday game. Canterbury became only the second team in the NRL era to lose three straight games without scoring a point after Cronulla who achieved this in the 2014 NRL season. It was also the worst start to a season by any team since Glebe in the 1928 NSWRFL season who managed to only score 12 points in their first four matches. In round 7 of the 2021 NRL season, Barrett earned his first win as Canterbury-Bankstown head coach after the club snapped a six-game losing streak to beat Cronulla-Sutherland 18–12.

In round 16 of the 2021 NRL season, Canterbury were defeated 66-0 by the Manly Sea Eagles. It was Canterbury's third biggest defeat in their 86-year history. At the end of the 2021 NRL season, Canterbury finished last on the table and claimed their sixth Wooden Spoon after winning only three matches all year.

On 16 May 2022, Barrett resigned from his role as head coach of the Canterbury-Bankstown Bulldogs. Barrett finished his tenure with the second lowest win percentage of any Canterbury coach since the clubs foundation in 1935 with 15.2 percent, only inaugural head coach Tedda Courtney had a lower win percentage with 12.5 percent.

On 18 August 2022, Barrett signed with the Parramatta Eels as an assistant coach, starting in 2023. On 20 May 2024, Barrett was named interim head coach at the Parramatta club after Brad Arthur was terminated from the head coaching position. Barrett took over Parramatta with the team sitting 14th on the table. In Barrett's first game as interim head coach, Parramatta would lose 42-26 against the bottom placed South Sydney team who were missing eight players and only had one previous win to their name before the match. The following week, he earned his first win in charge as Parramatta upset top of the table Cronulla 34-22. Barrett would eventually guide Parramatta to a 15th placed finish at the end of the 2024 NRL season.

In November 2024, Barrett joined the Brisbane Broncos as an assistant coach, ultimately becoming part of the club's 2025 premiership winning coaching staff.
