= Adam Bristow =

Australian rugby league footballer

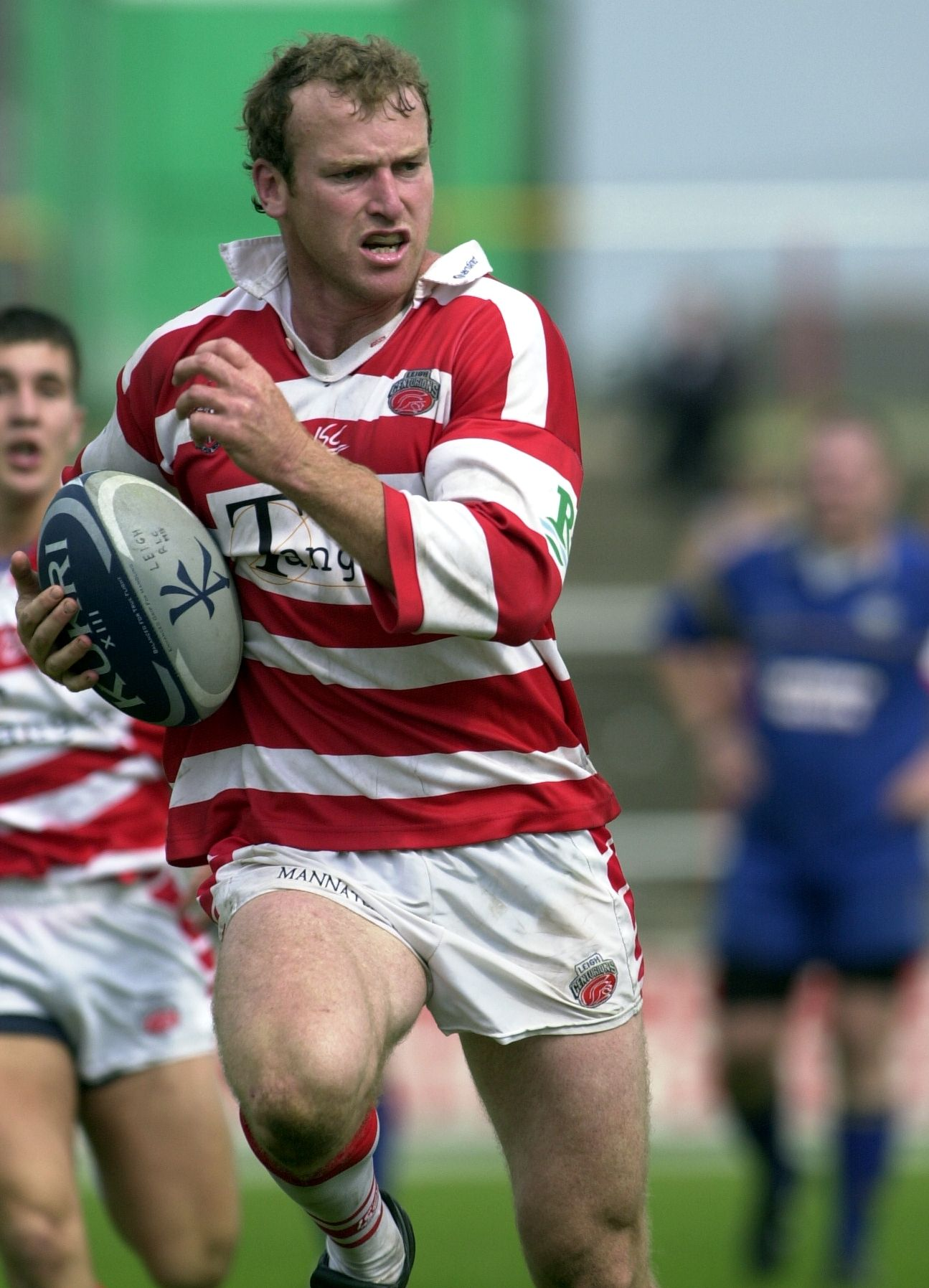
- Adam Bristow

Personal information
- Full name: Adam Bristow
- Born: 24 June 1973 (age 53) Sydney, New South Wales, Australia

Playing information
- Position: Loose forward
Club
Years	Team	Pld	T	G	FG	P
1996–98	Illawarra Steelers	20	4	0	0	16
1999	Western Suburbs	11	1	0	0	4
2000–03	Leigh Centurions	141	53	0	0	212
	Total	172	58	0	0	232
- As of 31 May 2019

Adam Bristow is an Australian former professional rugby league footballer who played in the 1990s and 2000s. He played for the Illawarra Steelers and the Western Suburbs Magpies in the Australian Rugby League and NRL competitions. He then played for the Leigh Centurions in England. Bristow played in both Illawarra and Western Suburbs final games in the NRL competition.

== Playing career ==
=== Illawarra ===
Bristow made his first grade debut for Illawarra against South Sydney in Round 1 1996 at WIN Stadium. Bristow would feature sporadically for Illawarra over the next 3 seasons but mainly played reserve grade. Bristow played in Illawarra's final ever game in the top grade, scoring the last ever try for the club as they lost 25–24 against Canterbury.

=== Western Suburbs ===
In 1999, Bristow signed with Western Suburbs and played 11 games for the club in what was also their final season as a stand-alone entity. Bristow played in the club's last game before their merger with fellow foundation club Balmain. Bristow played from the bench as Wests were defeated 60-16 by the Auckland Warriors.

=== Leigh ===
Bristow played and captained with Leigh until the end of 2003 before retiring and returning to Australia.
