= Darren Bradstreet =

Australian rugby league footballer

Personal information
- Full name: Darren Bradstreet
- Born: 14 November 1974 (age 50); Australia

Playing information
- Position: Prop, Hooker
Club
Years	Team	Pld	T	G	FG	P
1997–98	Illawarra Steelers	31	3	15	0	42
1999–00	London Broncos	8	2	0	0	8
	Total	39	5	15	0	50
- Father: Bill Bradstreet

Darren Bradstreet (born 14 November 1974) is a professional rugby league footballer who played for the Illawarra Steelers in the National Rugby League and the London Broncos in the Super League.

== Background ==
Bradstreet is the son of former Manly-Warringah player Bill Bradstreet. His grandfather Fred Bradstreet played for North Sydney in the 1940s.

== Playing career ==
Bradstreet made his debut for Illawarra in Round 1 of the 1997 season against South Sydney which ended in a 50–10 victory at WIN Stadium. At the end of the season, Illawarra finished in 6th position and qualified for the finals for only the second time in their history. Bradstreet played for Illawarra in their elimination final loss against the Gold Coast at Parramatta Stadium.

In the 1998 season, Bradstreet made 10 appearances and played in Illawarra's final game as a stand-alone entity which was against Canterbury in Round 26 1998 at WIN Stadium. Illawarra lost the match 25–24. For the start of the 1999 season, Illawarra formed a joint venture with St. George to become known as the St George-Illawarra Dragons. Bradstreet was not offered a contract with the new team.

Bradstreet then joined the London Broncos in England and played two seasons with them before retiring.
