= Craig Simon =

Australian rugby league footballer

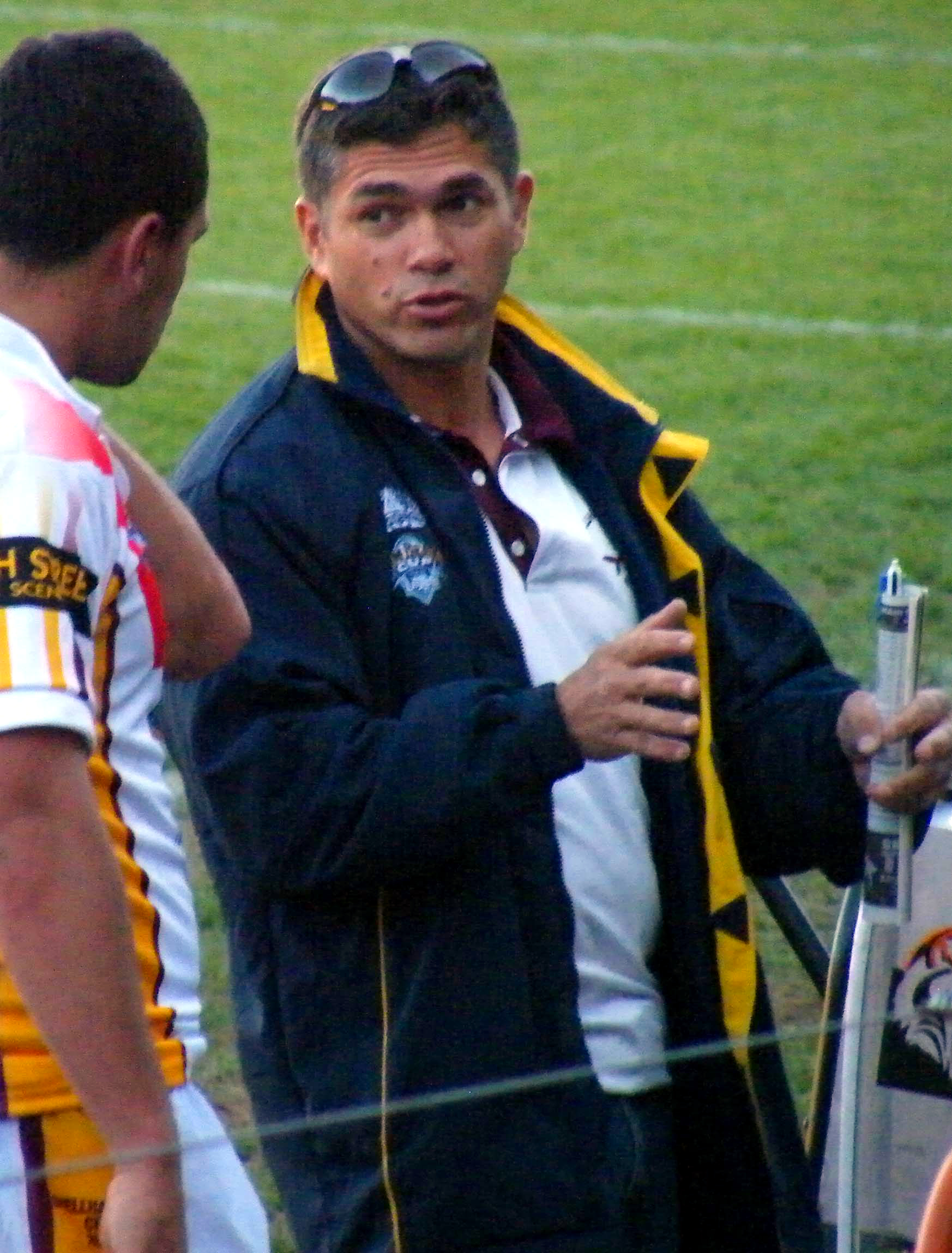

Personal information
- Full name: Craig Simon
- Born: 17 April 1973 (age 51)

Playing information
- Position: Centre, Five-eighth
Club
Years	Team	Pld	T	G	FG	P
1992–96	Illawarra Steelers	54	8	0	0	32
1997	South Sydney	18	1	0	0	4
1998	Illawarra Steelers	7	0	0	0	28
1999	Gateshead Thunder	30	7	0	0	28
2000	Hull FC	29	13	0	1	53
	Total	138	29	0	1	145
- Source: As of 15 September 2016

Craig Simon (born 17 April 1973) is an Australian former professional rugby league footballer who played first-grade in Australia for the Illawarra Steelers and the South Sydney Rabbitohs. In the Super League he played for Gateshead Thunder and Hull FC. He played as a five-eighth and centre.

== Playing career ==
Craig Simon is the brother of former Australian international John Simon. Simon made his first grade debut for Illawarra in round 5 of the 1992 NSWRL season against Penrith at Penrith Stadium. After five years with Illawarra, he transferred to South Sydney but only played one season with the club before moving back to Illawarra. Simon played for Illawarra in their final season in the NRL as a stand-alone entity. He also played in the clubs final ever game, a 25-24 loss against Canterbury at WIN Stadium. In 1999, Simon moved to English side Gateshead but the club only lasted one season and folded, shortly thereafter they merged with Hull F.C. Simon played one season with Hull F.C. before he was released.

== Post playing ==
Simon had coached in the lower grades with Shellharbour.
