= Brendon Reeves =

Australian rugby league footballer

Personal information
- Born: 16 July 1976 (age 50) Young, New South Wales, Australia

Playing information
- Height: 182 cm (6 ft 0 in)
- Weight: 88 kg (13 st 12 lb)
- Position: Fullback
Club
Years	Team	Pld	T	G	FG	P
1996–98	Illawarra Steelers	45	11	9	0	62
1999	Manly Sea Eagles	20	4	14	0	44
2000–02	Northern Eagles	66	30	5	0	130
2003	Manly Sea Eagles	13	3	0	0	12
	Total	144	48	28	0	248

Brendon Reeves (born 16 July 1976) is an Australian former professional rugby league footballer who played for the Illawarra Steelers, Manly-Warringah Sea Eagles and the Northern Eagles in the National Rugby League (NRL). He played at fullback. Reeves made his ARL debut in round 7 of the 1996 season for the Illawarra Steelers against the South Queensland Crushers.

== Playing career ==
Reeves, who came from the Riverina town of Quandialla in country NSW, was a member of Yanco's University Shield open-age rugby league side, travelled to Darwin for the Australian rugby league championships and also represented NSW Combined High Schools in rugby union.

In 1992, Reeves accepted a scholarship offer from the Illawarra Steelers which involved him moving to Wollongong when his time at Yanco had come to a conclusion. Reeves forced his way into first grade with the Steelers in 1996, but after three years in and out of first grade was forced to look elsewhere when the St George Illawarra Dragons joint venture was formed.

Reeves joined Manly in 1999 and was one of four players from the 1999 team to also play for the 2002 Northern Eagles. He showed his loyalty to the club by being one of the first to sign with Manly after the demise of the Northern Eagles joint venture and was instrumental in convincing other players to sign.

An injury-riddled season and increasing problems with a chronic knee and back injury forced Reeves into premature retirement at the end of 2003. On his retirement Peter Peters said. "Brendon's loyalty to Manly has been great and won't be forgotten. He has been a wonderful player and an inspiration to the young players coming through. As well as being an inspirational player he was an excellent club man."

Reeves commented that he was saddened to leave Manly. "I love the club and it has been good to me since I came to the area from Wollongong in 1999.I have no regrets other than I have to give up my career prematurely. "The way the club helped me through the last few months without putting me under any pressure was professional and caring. "I wish them all the best as the rebuilding process takes shape. I'll always consider myself a Manly player."

== Retirement ==
Since his premature retirement, Reeves has also been involved in rugby league at the coaching level. Between 2008 and 2010 he was coach of the NSW Universities rugby league side which played against the Queensland equivalent which was coached by ex-Broncos forward Darren Smith.He has also become a teacher at Camden High School.

== Pickleball ==
Brendon is a Pickleball player.
