= Dean Callaway =

Australian rugby league footballer

Personal information
- Full name: Dean James Callaway
- Born: 10 December 1970 (age 55) Australia
- Height: 180 cm (5 ft 11 in)
- Weight: 81 kg (12 st 11 lb)

Playing information
- Position: Hooker
Club
Years	Team	Pld	T	G	FG	P
1991–98	Illawarra Steelers	92	13	0	0	52
1999–00	London Broncos	58	13	0	0	52
	Total	150	26	0	0	104
- Source: As of 10 June 2019

Dean James Callaway (born 10 December 1970) is an Australian former professional rugby league footballer who played in the 1990s and 2000s. Callaway's position of choice was as a hooker. He played for Illawarra in Australia and London Broncos in the Super League.

== Playing career ==
Callaway made his first grade debut for Illawarra in Round 10 1991 against Manly-Warringah at WIN Stadium. In 1997, Callaway made 15 appearances as Illawarra reached the finals by finishing 6th. Callaway played in their elimination final defeat against the Gold Coast.

In 1998, Callaway made 19 appearances in what would prove to be Illawarra's final season in the top grade. Callaway captained the side in their final ever game which was in Round 24 1998 which ended in a 25–24 loss against Canterbury-Bankstown at WIN Stadium.

In 1999, Callaway joined English side the London Broncos after not being offered a contract to play with the joint venture side. Callaway made a total of 58 appearances for London and scored 13 tries before retiring.

== Post-playing ==
In 2008, Callaway coached the Dapto Canaries who play in the Illawarra Rugby League competition.
