= Craig Smith (rugby league, born 1971) =

New Zealand rugby league footballer and coach

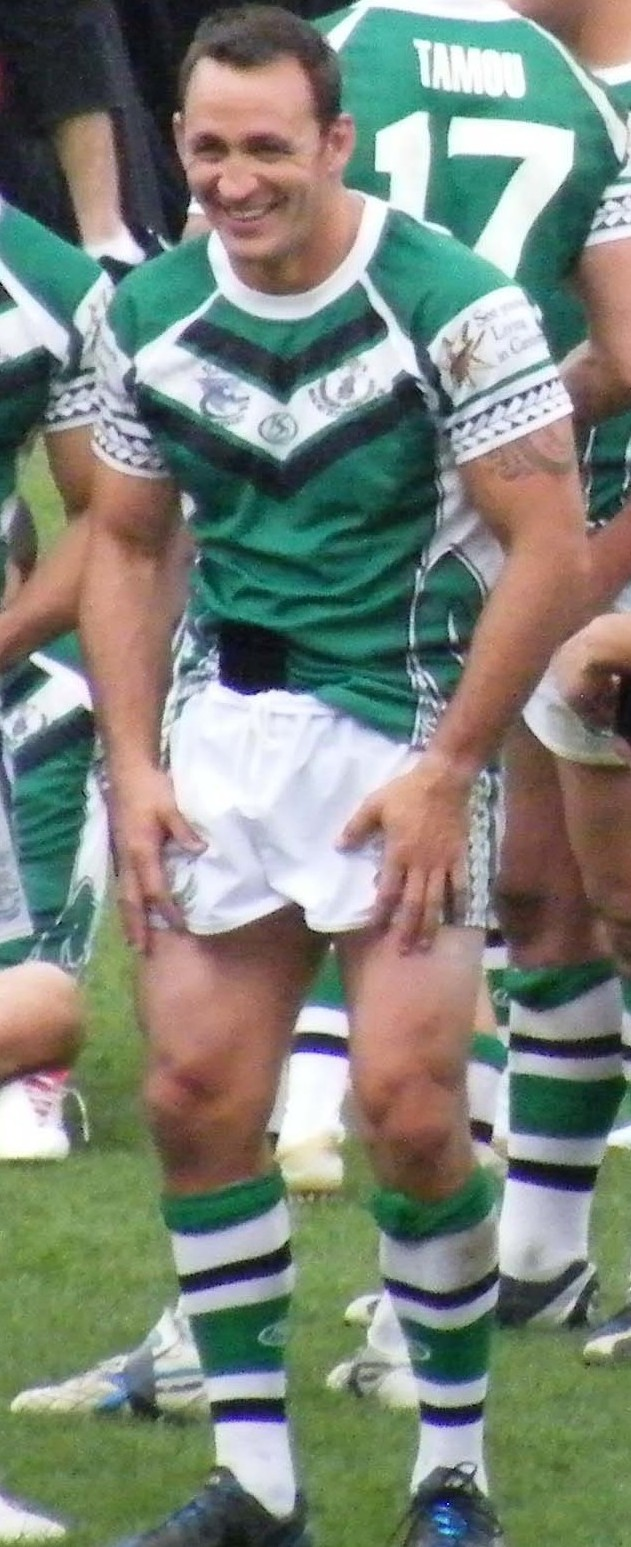

Personal information
- Born: 31 October 1971 (age 55) Kaitaia, New Zealand

Playing information
- Height: 187 cm (6 ft 1 1/2 in)
- Weight: 109 kg (17 st 2 lb)
- Position: Prop
Club
Years	Team	Pld	T	G	FG	P
1995	South Sydney	7	1	0	0	4
1996–98	Illawarra Steelers	49	1	0	0	4
1999–01	St George Illawarra	52	1	0	0	4
2002–04	Wigan Warriors	94	11	0	0	44
2005–06	Newcastle Knights	45	2	0	0	8
	Total	247	16	0	0	64
Representative
Years	Team	Pld	T	G	FG	P
1997	Queensland	3	0	0	0	0
1997	Rest of the World	1	0	0	0	0
1998–01	New Zealand	12	1	0	0	4
2008	New Zealand Māori	1	0	0	0	0

Craig Smith (born 31 October 1971) is a New Zealand former professional rugby league footballer who played as a prop in the 1990s and 2000s. He played for the South Sydney Rabbitohs, Illawarra Steelers, St. George Illawarra Dragons and the Newcastle Knights as well as representing New Zealand, New Zealand Māori and Queensland.

== Background ==
Smith was born in Kaitaia, New Zealand and originally was a rugby union player in Northland. In 1988, Smith moved to Queensland to complete his final years of schooling at Ipswich Grammar School. He later took up rugby league.

== Playing career ==
=== Club career ===
==== South Sydney Rabbitohs ====
Smith commenced his top level career with the South Sydney Rabbitohs in the 1995 ARL season.

==== Illawarra Steelers ====
He then moved to the Illawarra Steelers.

==== St. George Illawarra Dragons ====
Smith played at prop forward for the St. George Illawarra Dragons in their 1999 NRL Grand Final loss to the Melbourne Storm.

==== Wigan Warriors ====
Following a series of suspensions in 2001 for contrary conduct and striking, Smith left the NRL and Australia in 2002 to play for the Super League club, the Wigan Warriors. With Wigan, he won the 2002 Challenge Cup Final. In 2003 he was named at prop in the season's Super League Dream Team. Smith played for the Wigan Warriors at prop in the 2003 Super League Grand Final, which was lost to the Bradford Bulls.

==== Newcastle Knights ====
In 2005, Smith agreed to a one-year deal and a return to the NRL with the Newcastle Knights.

Although originally intending to retire at the end of the 2005 season, Smith was re-signed by Newcastle for the 2006 season. A broken jaw in August 2006 sidelined him for several rounds but he was fit to return for Newcastle's finals appearances. Smith played his last NRL game in Newcastle's semi-finals defeat by the Brisbane Broncos.

=== Representative career ===
==== Queensland ====
Smith was selected to represent Queensland as a prop for games I and II of the 1997 State of Origin series and on the bench for game III.

==== New Zealand ====
Smith was selected to go on the 1998 New Zealand tour of Great Britain and played for the Kiwis twelve times between 1998 and 2001.

Smith was selected for the New Zealand team to compete in the end of season 1999 Rugby League Tri-Nations tournament. In the final against Australia he played at prop forward in the Kiwis' 20-22 loss.

==== New Zealand Maori ====
Smith was again coaxed out of retirement to take part in the New Zealand Māori team that met the Indigenous Dreamtime team in a commemorative match at the 2008 Rugby League World Cup.

== Coaching career ==
Smith has been on the coaching staff for the under-20s side at Newcastle.
