= Will Robinson (rugby league) =

Australian rugby league footballer (born 1971)

Personal information
- Full name: William Wallace Robinson
- Born: 20 February 1971 (age 54); Dubbo, New South Wales, Australia
- Height: 174 cm (5 ft 9 in)
- Weight: 80 kg (12 st 8 lb; 180 lb)

Playing information
- Position: Centre, Five-eighth, Halfback, Hooker
Club
Years	Team	Pld	T	G	FG	P
1990–94	Balmain Tigers	62	27	2	0	112
1995–96	South Sydney	25	5	0	0	20
1997–98	Illawarra Steelers	9	0	0	0	36
1999	Gateshead Thunder	8	0	0	0	32
2000	Hull FC	4	0	0	0	16
	Total	108	32	2	0	216
Representative
Years	Team	Pld	T	G	FG	P
1992–94	Australian Aborigines	3	1	0	0	0
- Source: As of 4

Will Robinson (born 20 February 1971) is an Australian rugby league footballer who played professionally in England and Australia.

== Playing career ==
Robinson started his career with the Balmain Tigers in 1990, debuting against Newcastle. In 1992 Robinson played for the Indigenous Australian rugby league team in the 1992 Pacific Cup. He was named in the team of the tournament, on the bench. Usually a five eighth or halfback in 1994, his final season with the Tigers, he moved into the centres.

He then spent two seasons with the South Sydney Rabbitohs, also playing at hooker. Robinson spent 1997 and 1998 with the Illawarra Steelers. Robinson played in Illawarra's final ever game in the top grade which was a 25–24 loss against Canterbury-Bankstown in Round 24 1998 at WIN Stadium.

Robinson then moved to England, spending 1999 with the Gateshead Thunder before joining Hull FC for the 2000 season.

Robinson then returned to his hometown of Coonabarabran, where he led the Unicorns to its inaugural Group 4 First Grade Premiership victory over the North Tamworth Bears in 2003.
