= Danny Moore =

Australia international rugby league footballer

Personal information
- Full name: Daniel Moore
- Born: 2 November 1971 (age 55) Townsville, Queensland, Australia

Playing information
- Height: 193 cm (6 ft 4 in)
- Position: Centre, Wing
Club
Years	Team	Pld	T	G	FG	P
1991–97	Manly Sea Eagles	119	41	0	0	164
1998–99	Wigan Warriors	57	22	0	0	88
2000	London Broncos	9	1	0	0	4
2001	North Qld Cowboys	2	0	0	0	0
	Total	187	64	0	0	256
Representative
Years	Team	Pld	T	G	FG	P
1995–97	Queensland	4	1	0	0	4
1995	Australia	4	3	0	0	12

Danny Moore (born 2 November 1971) is an Australian former professional rugby league footballer who played in the 1990s and 2000s. An Australian international and Queensland State of Origin representative who played most of his career either at Centre or on the Wing, he played his club football in Australia for the Manly-Warringah Sea Eagles (with whom he won the 1996 ARL premiership) and the North Queensland Cowboys. He also played in England for the Wigan Warriors (with whom he won 1998's Super League III) and the London Broncos.1st player to win a grand final in the Northern and Southern Hemisphere

== Playing career ==
=== 1990s ===
A Townsville junior, Moore's early career was played in the back row. He joined the Manly-Warringah Sea Eagles as a Lock forward where he made his first grade début in the round 7 clash of the 1991 NSWRL season against the Parramatta Eels at Brookvale Oval, playing from the bench in Manly's 30–18 win. After spending the rest of the 1991 and all of 1992 playing in Reserve Grade, he was switched to the centres at the start of the 1993 NSWRFL season and became a regular first grader.

Moore moved to the Super League to play for English club Wigan in 1998, appearing at centre in their 1998 Super League Grand Final victory over Leeds.

=== 2000s ===
Moore shifted to the London Broncos for 2000's Super League V. His final year was the 2001 NRL season in which he played two games for the North Queensland Cowboys.
