= 1996 Illawarra Steelers season =

Illawarra Steelers
- 1996 season
- CEO: (Australia) Bob Millward
- Head coach: (Australia) Allan McMahon
- Captain: (Australia) John Cross
- ARL: 14 (out of 20)
- Reserve Grade: 8 (of 20), Preliminary Final
- President's Cup: 3 (of 20), Preliminary Final
- Top try scorer: Club: Rod Wishart (14)
- Top points scorer: Club: Rod Wishart (160)
- Highest home attendance: 9,744 (vs. Western Suburbs Magpies, 22 March 1996, at WIN Stadium)
- Lowest home attendance: 4,883 (vs. South Queensland Crushers, 5 May 1996, at WIN Stadium)
- Average home attendance: 7,434 (Total 81,778)

The 1996 Illawarra Steelers season was the fifteenth in the club's history. They competed in the Australian Rugby League's 1996 Optus Cup season, finishing in 14th place on the ladder, missing out on the finals for the fourth year in a row. The Reserve Grade and President's Cup teams both missed out on their respective Grand Finals by one game, whilst the junior Steelers - the S.G. Ball and Harold Matthew's sides both won their competitions.

== Player movements ==
Gains

Player	Previous club

Losses

Player	Joined Club

== Squad ==
No.

Position
Player

Glen Air – HB Adam Bristow – LK Dean Callaway – HK Paul Carige – FB Wayne Clifford – WG David Cox – PR John Cross – LK (c) Maea David – PR Darrien Doherty – PR Scott England – PR Darren Fritz – PR Brad Hepi – HK Brad Mackay – LK Paul McGregor – CE Brendan O'Meara – FB

No.

Position
Player

Neil Piccinelli – SR Andrew Purcell – HK Brendon Reeves – FB Wayne Richards – SR David Riolo – FB Brett Rodwell – CE Fili Seru – WG Craig Simon – CE Craig Smith – PR Shaun Timmins – CE David Walsh – PR Josh White – HB Kyle White – PR Rod Wishart – WG

== Draw and results ==
=== Quick summary ===
1996 Illawarra Steelers season summary

Round	Home	Score	Away
1	Steelers	8-17	Wests
2	Auckland	18-10	Steelers
3	Brisbane	54-4	Steelers
4	Steelers	56-14	Souths
5	Chargers	28-20	Steelers
6	Steelers	20-30	Auckland

Round	Home	Score	Away
7	Steelers	18-14	Sth Qld
8	Nth Qld	24-8	Steelers
9	Steelers	18-12	Dragons
10	Canterbury	12-0	Steelers
11	Canberra	16-14	Steelers
12	Steelers	14-6	Brisbane

Round	Home	Score	Away
13	Nth Syd	48-18	Steelers
14	Steelers	8-16	Manly
15	Steelers	18-19	Reds
16	Eels	34-18	Steelers
17	Steelers	16-32	Sydney
18	Newcastle	22-34	Steelers

Round	Home	Score	Away
19	Steelers	21-14	Sharks
20	Balmain	16-14	Steelers
21	Steelers	42-2	Penrith
22	Wests	12-8	Steelers

=== Regular season ===
==== March ====
Round 1: 22 March 1996; Optus Cup	Illawarra Steelers	(0) 8–17 (6)	Western Suburbs Magpies	Wollongong, New South Wales
	Tries: Fili Seru 2; Goals: Rod Wishart 0/2		Tries: Craig Coleman; Ciriaco Mescia; Damian Kennedy; Goals: Andrew Leeds 2/3, field goal	Stadium: WIN Stadium; Attendance: 9,744; Referee: Kelvin Jeffes (Field)

O'Meara; Wishart, Rodwell, McGregor, Seru; C.Simon, J.White; Fritz, Callaway, England, Cross (c), Richards, Timmins. Cox, Hepi, Bristow.

Round 2: 31 March 1996; Optus Cup	Auckland Warriors	(6) 18–10 (0)	Illawarra Steelers	Auckland, New Zealand
	Tries: Tea Roparti 2; Richie Blackmore; Goals: Greg Alexander 2/2; Gavin Hill 1/2		Tries: Paul McGregor; Rod Wishart; Goals: Rod Wishart 1/2	Stadium: Ericsson Stadium; Attendance: 17,246; Referee: David Manson (Field)

O'Meara; Wishart, Rodwell, McGregor, Seru; C.Simon, J.White; Fritz, Callaway, Richards, Mackay, Cross (c), Timmins. D.Walsh, Piccinelli, England, Carige.

Reserve Grade: Illawarra Steelers defeated Auckland Warriors 18-12.

==== April ====
Round 3: Saturday 6 April 1996; Optus Cup	Brisbane Broncos	(26) 54–4 (4)	Illawarra Steelers	Brisbane, Queensland
	Tries: Darren Lockyer 2; Willie Carne; Glenn Lazarus; Michael Hancock; Wendell Sailor; Darren Smith; Steve Renouf; Peter Ryan; John Plath; Goals: Willie Carne 6/9; Darren Lockyer 1/1		Tries: Rod Wishart; Goals: Rod Wishart 0/1	Stadium: ANZ Stadium; Attendance: 24,577; Referee: Kelvin Jeffes (Field)

O'Meara; Wishart, Rodwell, McGregor, Seru; C.Simon, J.White; Fritz, Callaway, Richards, Mackay, Timmins, Cross (c). Carige, Walsh, Doherty, Hepi.

Reserve Grade: Brisbane defeated Illawarra 24-14

Round 4: Sunday 14 April 1996; Optus Cup	Illawarra Steelers	(20) 56–14 (10)	South Sydney Rabbitohs	Wollongong, New South Wales
	Tries: Glen Air 3; Brad Mackay 2; Brett Rodwell 2; Brad Hepi; David Riolo; Rod Wishart; Goals: Rod Wishart 8/11		Tries: Darrell Trindall; Paul Mellor; Goals: Craig Field 3/4	Stadium: Steelers Stadium; Attendance: 7,083; Referee: Rob Alexander (Field)

Riolo; Wishart, Timmins, McGregor, Seru; Mackay, Air; Fritz, Hepi, Walsh, Cross (c), Doherty, Rodwell. Richards, England, Cox, J.White.

Souths forward Martin Masella was sent-off after 35 minutes for an illegal use of the elbow. Steelers hooker Brad Hepi was cited for a high tackle, but later exonerated.

Reserve Grade: Illawarra defeated Souths 18-2.

Round 5: 20 April 1996; Optus Cup	Gold Coast Chargers	(16) 28–20 (10)	Illawarra Steelers	Gold Coast, Queensland
	Tries: Dave Watson 2; Shane Kenward; David Baildon; Lee Oudenryn; Goals: Lee Oudenryn 2/3; Brad Hurst 2/3		Tries: Rod Wishart; Glen Air; Darren Fritz; Brendan O'Meara; Goals: Rod Wishart 2/4	Stadium: Carrara Stadium; Attendance: 7,251; Referee: Graeme West (Field)

Riolo; Wishart, Timmins, Simon, Seru; Mackay, Air; Fritz, Hepi, Walsh, Doherty, Cross (c), Rodwell. Cox, Richards, O'Meara, J.White.

Gold Coast Chargers winger David Baildon was sent-off after 39 minutes for striking and was later sentenced to six weeks on the sideline. The Steelers, however, could not use the extra man advantage in the second-half to win the game. They were able to peg the score back to 16-all early in the second-half, but were unable go on with it. Two tries to the Chargers assured victory for the home team.

Reserve Grade: Illwarra defeated Gold Coast 20-10.

Round 6: Sunday 28 April 1996; Optus Cup	Illawarra Steelers	(20) 20–30 (6)	Auckland Warriors	Wollongong, New South Wales
	Tries: Kyle White; John Cross; Shaun Timmins; Goals: Rod Wishart 4/4		Tries: Phil Blake; Stacey Jones; Greg Alexander; T. Tatupu; Marc Ellis; Goals: Gene Ngamu 3/3; G. Hill 2/2	Stadium: Steelers Stadium; Attendance: 8,055; Referee: Rob Alexander (Field)

Riolo; Wishart, Timmins, Simon, Seru; Mackay, Air; Fritz, Hepi, Walsh, Doherty, Cross (c), Rodwell. K.White, Richards, O'Meara, Purcell.

The Steelers coughed up a 20-6 lead at half-time with some sloppy handling and disastrous defence to give away 24 unanswered second-half points to the boys that travelled from across the Tasman.

Reserve Grade: Illawarra defeated Auckland 29-10.

==== May ====
Round 7: 5 May 1996; Optus Cup	Illawarra Steelers	(10) 18–14 (12)	South Queensland Crushers	Wollongong, New South Wales
				Stadium: Steelers Stadium

Round 8: Optus Cup	North Queensland Cowboys	(6) 24–8 (8)	Illawarra Steelers	Townsville, Queensland
				Stadium: Stockland Stadium; Referee: Eddie Ward (Field)

Round 9: 18 May 1996; Optus Cup	Illawarra Steelers	(8) 18–12 (0)	St. George Dragons	Wollongong, New South Wales
				Stadium: Steelers Stadium; Referee: Kelvin Jeffes (Field)

Round 10: Friday 31 May 1996; Optus Cup	Canterbury Bulldogs	(2) 12–0 (0)	Illawarra Steelers	Sydney, New South Wales
				Stadium: Belmore Sports Ground; Attendance: 6,022; Referee: Graeme West (Field)

==== June ====
Round 11: Optus Cup	Canberra Raiders	(6) 16–14 (8)	Illawarra Steelers	Canberra, ACT
	Tries: Noa Nadruku; S.Stone; Simon Woolford; Goals: Robinson 1/1; Jason Ferris 1/4		Tries: Neil Piccinelli; Brendon Reeves; Goals: Shaun Timmins 3/4	Stadium: Bruce Stadium

Reserve Grade: Illawarra defeated Canberra 22-16.

Round 12: Optus Cup	Illawarra Steelers	() 14–6 ()	Brisbane Broncos	Wollongong, New South Wales
				Stadium: Steelers Stadium

Round 13: Optus Cup	North Sydney Bears	() 48–18 ()	Illawarra Steelers	North Sydney, New South Wales
				Stadium: North Sydney Oval

==== July ====
Round 14: Optus Cup	Illawarra Steelers	() 8–16 ()	Manly Sea Eagles

== Ladder ==
	Team	Pld	W	D	L	PF	PA	PD	Pts
1	Manly-Warringah	22	18	0	4	549	191	+358	36
2	Brisbane	21	17	0	4	607	263	+344	34
3	North Sydney	22	15	2	5	598	325	+273	32
4	Sydney City	22	15	1	6	521	321	+200	31
5	Cronulla-Sutherland	21	14	2	5	399	268	+131	30
6	Canberra	21	13	1	7	538	384	+154	27
7	St. George	21	12	1	8	443	360	+83	27
8	Western Suburbs	22	12	1	9	394	434	−40	25
9	Newcastle	21	10	1	10	416	388	+28	23
10	Canterbury	21	11	0	10	375	378	−3	22
11	Auckland	21	10	0	11	412	427	−15	22
12	Balmain	22	11	0	11	319	459	−140	22
13	Parramatta	21	9	1	11	404	415	−11	21
14	Illawarra	22	8	0	14	403	444	−41	16
15	Penrith	21	7	1	13	363	464	−101	15
16	Western Reds	21	6	1	14	313	420	−107	13
17	North Queensland	21	6	0	15	288	643	−355	12
18	Gold Coast	22	5	1	16	359	521	−162	11
19	South Sydney	22	5	1	16	314	634	−320	11
20	South Queensland	21	3	0	18	220	496	−276	8

== Home crowd averages ==
Round	Opposition	Venue	Crowd
Round 1	Western Suburbs Magpies	Steelers Stadium, Wollongong	9,744
Round 4	South Sydney Rabbitohs	Steelers Stadium, Wollongong	7,083
Round 6	Auckland Warriors	Steelers Stadium, Wollongong	8,055
Round 7	South Queensland Crushers	Steelers Stadium, Wollongong	4,883
Round 9	St. George Dragons	Steelers Stadium, Wollongong	8,529
Round 12	Brisbane Broncos	Steelers Stadium, Wollongong	6,121
Round 14	Manly Sea Eagles	Steelers Stadium, Wollongong	9,638
Round 15	WA Reds	Steelers Stadium, Wollongong	7,115
Round 17	Sydney City Roosters	Steelers Stadium, Wollongong	5,247
Round 19	Cronulla Sharks	Steelers Stadium, Wollongong	8,017
Round 21	Penrith Panthers	Steelers Stadium, Wollongong	7,346
Total			81,778
Average			7,434
