= Hepi (name) =

Hepi is both a surname and a given name. Notable people with the name include:

- Brad Hepi (born 1968), New Zealand rugby league player
- Hepi Te Heuheu (1919–1997), Māori tribal leader
- Tyla Hepi (born 1993), New Zealand rugby league footballer, son of Brad
