= Hepi =

Hepi or HEPI may refer to:

- Hepi (name)
- Hepi TV, a Serbian television network
- Higher Education Price Index
