= David Penna =

Australian rugby league footballer & coach

Personal information
- Full name: David Penna
- Born: 25 July 1972 (age 54)

Playing information
- Height: 180 cm (5 ft 11 in)
- Weight: 84 kg (13 st 3 lb)
- Position: Fullback, Centre, Five-eighth, Halfback
Club
Years	Team	Pld	T	G	FG	P
1990–93	Parramatta Eels	22	2	0	0	8
1994–97	South Sydney	56	19	0	0	76
1998–00	Parramatta Eels	56	11	0	3	47
	Total	134	32	0	3	131

Coaching information
Representative
Years	Team	Gms	W	D	L	W%
2009	Italy	0	0	0	0

David Penna (born 25 July 1972) is an Australian professional rugby league coach who is the head coach of the Canterbury-Bankstown Bulldogs in the New South Wales Cup and an assistant coach at the Canterbury Bulldogs in the NRL and professional former rugby league footballer who played for the Parramatta Eels and the South Sydney Rabbitohs during his long professional career.

== Playing career ==
Penna made his debut for Parramatta in 1990. He played 22 games over four seasons, often at centre or five-eighth.

In 1994 he moved to join the South Sydney Rabbitohs and played 56 games for the club over four seasons, usually at centre or fullback. Penna played for Souths in their upset 1994 Tooheys Challenge Cup final victory over Brisbane.

In 1998, Penna returned to Parramatta where he was usually used at five-eighth before moving into the halfback position in 1999. In 2000, Penna was forced to retire after breaking his neck twice and suffering six concussions in the single season.

== Coaching career ==
Penna turned his attention to coaching. In 2009 he coached an Italian XIII. Penna has also coached the Manly-Warringah Sea Eagles Toyota Cup (Under-20s) team. Penna was appointed as Manly's assistant NRL coach for the 2012 season, after Geoff Toovey was promoted to the position of head coach.

On 30 November 2016, he became the assistant coach to Des Hasler at the Canterbury-Bankstown Bulldogs.

In November 2018, he was announced as the new head coach of Canterbury's Jersey Flegg Cup side.

Sporting positions
Preceded by David Riolo; 2003-2006	Coach Italy; 2009	Succeeded by Tiziano Franchini; 2009
