= Flavour and Life =

Australian food and beverage company

- Type: Pty. Ltd.
- Industry: Food and beverage, cosmetics, manufacturing, production, food distribution
- Founded: 2011
- Headquarters: Sydney, Australia
- Key people: Fahad Al-Athel (Chairman)
- Products: Foods, beverages
- Brands: Coco Joy; Iso Boost; Hi Pro Boost; Juiced up; Favella; Sonetto; Kingdom Dates
- Website: Flavour and Life

Flavour and Life (FAL) Food and Beverages is a multinational food and beverage company headquartered in Sydney, Australia, with interests in the manufacturing, producing, marketing, and distribution of health-based foods, beverages, cosmetics, and other products. It is best known for its Coco Joy line of coconut-based foods and beverages.

Established in 2011, FAL has since established market presence in three continents and operational assets in Australia, Saudi Arabia, Malaysia, Vietnam, Brazil, China, India, and the United States.

== History ==
Flavour and Life was established in 2011 and is a member of the FAL Group, an international and local conglomerate of 75 companies, spanning 17 countries in the Middle East, Australia, the Americas and Europe. Between 2011 and 2016, FAL has progressively expanded its manufacturing capabilities, with manufacturing units across Malaysia, Vietnam, Saudi Arabia, and India.

== Operations ==
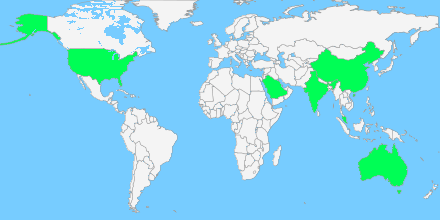
Map of FAL's worldwide operations presence

Flavour and Life is multinational with five operating companies and factories servicing over 15 countries. Sydney oversees operations in the Oceania region as well as operating as the global headquarters.
The Malaysian office oversees 10 countries in the ASEAN region as well as Hong Kong, Taiwan, Japan, and South Korea.
The China, India, and the United States regional offices operate for their respective domestic markets, as the three largest populated countries in the world.

== Products ==
=== Coco Joy ===
Flavour and Life is a maker of low-calorie, low-sugar and fat-free food and beverages products that include Coco Joy – its flagship brand utilizing coconuts. The Coco Joy line of products feature coconut water, coconut milk, oil, chips, flour, ice cream and others in various flavours. Coco Joy is currently in a partnership with Disney, Pixar, and Marvel to feature their respective characters on an assortment of products targeted for kids. As of 2015 season, Coco Joy are official partners of NRL club Manly Warringah Sea Eagles, Twenty20 team Melbourne Renegades, MLS club New York City Football Club, 2-time A-League finalists Melbourne City Football Club, and 2-time Premier League champions Manchester City Football Club. Cricket legend Sir Vivian Richards and ASP world title contender Sally Fitzgibbons are also signed as official brand ambassadors.

==== Juiced Up ====
Juiced Up is a health-based 100% juice product made with no added sugar, no added artificial flavours, no artificial colours, and available in carbonated and non carbonated forms.

==== FAL Performance ====
FAL Performance is a line of products inclined towards an "active lifestyle". The first two products released are Iso Boost, an isotonic beverage, and Hi-Pro Boost- a high protein drink.
