= Manly Warringah Sea Eagles =

Australian rugby league football club

Club information
- Full name: Manly Warringah Sea Eagles
- Nickname: Sea Eagles
- Short name: MAN
- Colours: Maroon; White
- Founded: 4 November 1946
- Exited: 1999 (merged with North Sydney Bears as Northern Eagles)
- Readmitted: 2003
- Website: seaeagles.com.au

details
- Ground: Brookvale Oval (18,000)
- CEO: Jason King
- Chairman: Scott Penn
- Coach: Kieran Foran
- Manager: Peter Gentle
- Captain: Tom Trbojevic
- Competition: National Rugby League
- 2026 season: 9th
- Current season

Uniforms
Home colours	Away colours

Records
- Premierships: 8 (1972, 1973, 1976, 1978, 1987, 1996, 2008, 2011)
- Runners-up: 11 (1951, 1957, 1959, 1968, 1970, 1982, 1983, 1995, 1997, 2007, 2013)
- Minor premierships: 9 (1971, 1972, 1973, 1976, 1983, 1987, 1995, 1996, 1997)
- World Club Challenge: 1 (2009)
- NSW Cup: 5 (1954,1960,1969,1973,1988)
- Wooden spoons: 0
- Most capped: 352 – Daly Cherry-Evans
- Highest try scorer: 166 – Brett Stewart
- Highest points scorer: 1917 – Graham Eadie

The Manly Warringah Sea Eagles are an Australian professional rugby league club based in Sydney's Northern Beaches. They compete in the National Rugby League (NRL). The Manly club debuted in the 1947 New South Wales Rugby Football League season and currently hosts the majority of their home games at Brookvale Oval in Brookvale. They train at their Centre of Excellence in Brookvale, and at the New South Wales Academy of Sport in Narrabeen. The team colours are maroon and white, and they are commonly known as Manly.

The club competed in the NSWRL, ARL, or NRL competitions in all respective seasons from 1947 until 1999. At the end of 1999, they entered into a joint venture with the North Sydney Bears to form the Northern Eagles, which rugby league statisticians regard as a separate club. The Northern Eagles competed in the 2000 and 2001 NRL seasons, after which the joint venture collapsed. The Manly Warringah club (who held the NRL licence) competed in the NRL as the Northern Eagles for a further season in 2002, before abandoning the name and identity to return to what they are known as today.

Since winning their first premiership in 1972, the club has won a further seven first-grade titles, with their most recent being in 2011. The club's eight titles span five consecutive decades. Since their first Grand Final appearance in 1951, the club has appeared in 19 Grand Finals across seven consecutive decades.

== History ==
After unsuccessful attempts in 1937 and 1944, early in 1946 the Manly-Warringah Junior Rugby Football League again applied to the NSWRL for admission in 1947 to the Sydney district first grade clubs competition (now NRL).

By the mid-1940s, the movement to expand rugby league in Sydney had gained serious momentum and Manly and Warringah, as with all the other Sydney district rugby clubs, endured internal agonies as the new "League" was considered. In 1946, Manly-Warringah defeated North Sydney 12–8 in the Presidents Cup Grand Final which helped the club gain momentum in pushing for inclusion into the NSWRL competition.

The NSWRL finally accepted Manly-Warringah's application on the 4 November 1946. Along with Parramatta, they were granted admission to the 1947 competition. It was North Sydney themselves who had the most to lose from Manly-Warringah entering the league but they advocated for a team to be on the Northern Beaches. Norths believed Manly-Warringah's inclusion in the competition would provide a far better platform for Rugby League to gain a hold over Rugby Union in the peninsula area.

North Sydney endured an exodus of players to the newly formed team with 20 Manly and Warringah juniors returning to play for their local club in their first season. Norths lost half of their games in 1947, before spending the next four seasons towards the bottom of the ladder.

Manly immediately adopted the maroon and white colours they had used for their Presidents Cup team since its inception and borrowed originally from the Freshwater SLSC of which Ken Arthurson and other players were members. For their emblem they chose the sea eagle – the native bird of prey of the Sydney coastline. Although a number of media writers referred to Manly as the "sea gulls", the club maintains that it has always officially been the Sea Eagles.

The club sought to obtain use of Manly Oval as their home ground, however the lease of the ground from Manly Council was held by Manly rugby union club who refused to grant any match days to rugby league. The home field of the Manly-Warringah Junior Rugby League (the body who successfully secured the club's 1947 admission to first grade) had since at least 1939 been Brookvale Oval.

Manly-Warringah's first premiership game was against Western Suburbs at Brookvale Oval on Saturday 12 April 1947. Max Whitehead, who had first played for Norths in 1942 and was a member of their 1943 Grand Final team, was Manly's first captain. Whitehead was a big barrel-chested second rower who was used by Bonds as the model for their iconic "Chesty Bond" character. Their first win was against the Parramatta Eels and the club finished their first season in second last place.

Manly's first Grand Final appearance was in the 1951 season, which they lost to South Sydney. Manly Warringah played in five Grand Finals before winning their first premiership in 1972. They then won the following year in 1973 and again in 1976 and 1978. The 1973 final against Cronulla is reputed to be one of the hardest and toughest grand finals, at least in the televised era. There were several incidents of players being hurt, in particular very tough and hard English import, Mal Reilly, was "taken" out early and did not take any further part in the game.

Chart of yearly table positions for Manly-Warringah Sea Eagles in First Grade Rugby League

Manly were powerful in the early 1980s but were beaten in two consecutive Grand finals by Parramatta, in 1982 and 1983. Their next premiership was won against the Canberra Raiders in the 1987 Grand final, the last Grand Final played at the Sydney Cricket Ground. Coached by Bob Fulton, the Sea Eagles returned to the play-offs in 1993 and 1994 but were beaten on each occasions in the first elimination semi-final by the Brisbane Broncos.

In 1988, Manly, missing six regular first grade players, including captain Paul Vautin, Michael O'Connor and Phil Daley who were all playing in the first Ashes series test just four days later, plus other stars such as Dale Shearer, Mal Cochrane and David Ronson (all six had played in the 1987 Grand Final win), put the touring Great Britain Lions to the sword with a 30-0 demolition at Brookvale Oval. Teenage halfback Geoff Toovey was named man of the match, scoring one of the Sea Eagles five tries on the night while the side was led by Noel Cleal who had a point to prove after being a shock omission from the Australian team. Great Britain's coach for their 1988 tour was Mal Reilly who had played lock forward for the Manly in their 1972 and 1973 Grand Final wins. It would be the first time that former premiership teammates Fulton and Reilly would oppose each other from the coaches box. With Fulton taking over as coach of the Australian team from 1989, it would not be their last time coaching against each other.

In 1995, amidst the Super League war, Manly produced one of its most dominating seasons in the club's history but in one of the league's biggest upsets, were beaten by Canterbury in the Grand Final. Despite being the best attacking side all year, the Sea Eagles could not score a try in the Grand Final and were defeated by the underdog Canterbury side, led by Terry Lamb.

In 1996 Manly made another Grand Final appearance and beat St. George to win the title that had eluded them the season before. Rugby League in Australia was split in two leagues in 1997, the ARL and Super League, and Manly were one of the leading teams in the ARL competition. For the third consecutive year Manly reached the Grand Final, however lapses in their intensity which appeared during the season returned in the premiership decider against the Mal Reilly coached Newcastle Knights and the Sea Eagles were beaten on the full-time siren by a Knights try.

The teams of 1995 to 1997 featured rugby league's strongest defence. Many great players featured, including Des Hasler, Geoff Toovey, Nik Kosef, Steve Menzies, Terry Hill, Mark Carroll, Cliff Lyons, David Gillespie, Craig Hancock, Danny Moore, John Hopoate, and former NZ All Blacks Matthew Ridge and Craig Innes.

After 1997 the club lost form on the field, recording only 10th place in the 1998 season, and missing the finals in 1999.

== Northern Eagles ==
Manly Warringah would usher in the new millennium by merging with the North Sydney Bears to become the Northern Eagles, with Geoffrey Bellew being the Chairman at this time. This venture would run between 2000 and 2002. The club was formed during the rationalisation process of the NRL. The team would share home games between Brookvale Oval and Central Coast Stadium, Gosford, New South Wales.

Little success was had during these three seasons, finishing 12th, 10th, and 9th, winning 30 of 76 games. Also, the new club's decision to play games in Gosford instead of the Bears home ground at North Sydney Oval alienated several North Sydney fans, despite North Sydney's planned move to the new Central Coast Stadium. In spite of this, the club provided more players for the 2001 State of Origin series' New South Wales team than any other club. The partnership dissolved in 2002, with Manly emerging as the stand-alone entity. The 2002 season was played under the Northern Eagles name, although effectively the club was the Manly-Warringah Sea Eagles by another name. Halfway through the season, the Eagles even abandoned playing games at Gosford, due to a sharp decline in attendances. The people of Gosford preferred to wait until a home grown team was based there.

The joint venture would collapse by the end of the 2001 season and Manly would officially make a welcome return to the NRL in 2003.

== Resurrection ==
The joint venture collapsed and Manly retained the Northern Eagles licence for the 2002 season until returning to the competition as Manly Warringah Sea Eagles for the 2003 season. The 2006 and 2007 seasons produced very few moments of joy for Sea Eagles supporters. The club improved its playing stocks for 2005, and reached the semi-finals for the first time since 1998. Manly would not miss the finals until 2015, whilst every other club have missed the finals at least once since 2004. A meeting of the Football Club on 3 June 2004 saw the club members vote for the privatisation of the Football Club.

During this period, Manly introduced a number of players who became stars of the game over the next decade including local juniors Jason King and Anthony Watmough, as well as the Stewart brothers from Wollongong, back row forward Glenn and speedy try scoring fullback Brett.

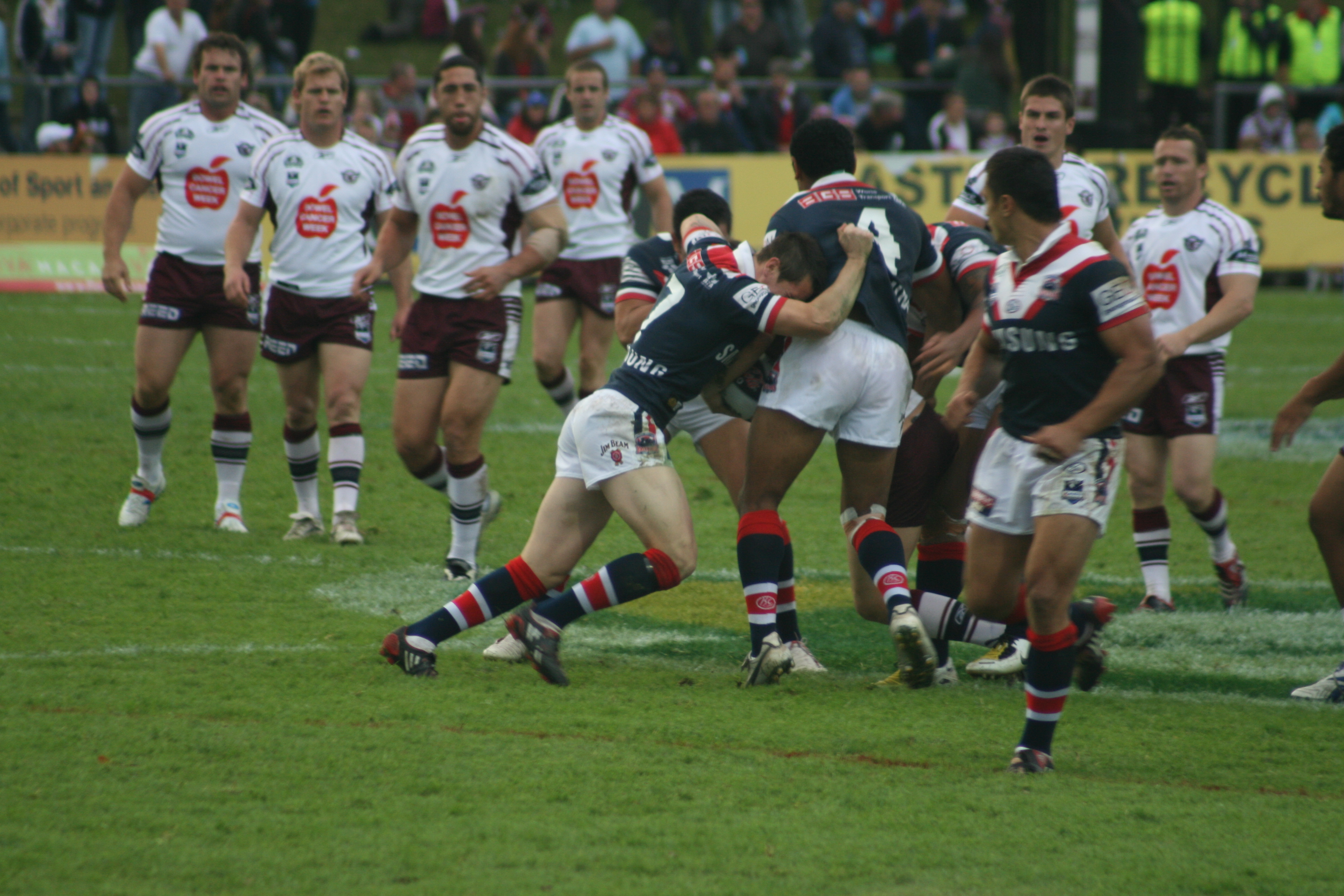
Manly Sea Eagles in action against the Sydney Roosters at Brookvale Oval in June 2008

=== 2007 season ===
Manly finished the 2007 regular season in 2nd (out of 16) place, losing only six matches throughout. Their 50-16 mauling of Newcastle ensured they would finish in the top two. Throughout the season they were the only club chasing Melbourne (whom they beat in round 11) for the minor premiership. After defeating North Queensland at the Sydney Football Stadium 28–6, Manly played in their 15th grand final against Melbourne, where they were beaten 34–8 by Melbourne on 30 September at Telstra Stadium.

Melbourne would later be stripped of the 2007 title for salary cap breaches.

=== 2008 season ===
With the departure of hooker Michael Monaghan, many questioned whether the Manly could be as competitive as in 2007 and losses in the first 2 rounds seemed to confirm this. Manly finished the regular season tied first with Melbourne and Cronulla but 2nd on points differential and Manly missed out on claiming their first minor premiership since 1997.

In the qualifying final Manly faced 7th placed St. George at Brookvale. This game was club legend Steve Menzies' last game at Brookvale and he opened the scoring with an unusual charge down try in which after kicking ahead to himself and falling over, the ball bounced up and hit him in the head before he finally grounded it. After getting the week off, Manly faced the history-making New Zealand Warriors. Manly crushed the Warriors 32–6 and showcased their trademark wall of defence and attacking flair. With the win, Manly qualified for their 17th grand final, where in a rematch of the 2007 decider, they would play the Melbourne Storm.

The story of the grand final was very different for Manly-Warringah this time around, as they decimated Melbourne 40–0 (which was the largest number of points scored against a team in a grand final) to win their seventh premiership in front of 80,388 at ANZ Stadium. It was Michael Monaghan's replacement, the previously unknown Matt Ballin, who scored the first try of the match. The game was also notable for winger Michael Robertson's hat-trick (the first time a Manly player had scored 3 tries in a finals game since Gordon Willoughby scored 3 against Western Suburbs in the 1951 Semi-final at the SCG) and retiring legend Steve Menzies' try 10 minutes from full-time, which he scored after coming back onto the field to replace the injured Steve Matai. Manly prop forward Brent Kite was awarded the Clive Churchill Medal after a powerhouse display which included a classy try in the 58th minute. This is the largest winning margin in a grand final in rugby league history.

=== 2009 season ===
Three weeks prior to the 2009 season, Des Hasler and his team travelled to England where as the reigning NRL premiers they would take on reigning Super League premiers the Leeds Rhinos in the 2009 World Club Challenge to be played at the Elland Road ground in Leeds. After having lost their previous World Club Challenge game to Wigan in 1987 (with Hasler the halfback in that Manly side), the Sea Eagles took this game much more seriously and included a warm-up game against the Harlequins in London a week before the game (won 34-26 by the Sea Eagles). The warm-up game (Manly were the first Australian side to actually play such a game before a WCC) proved effective as Manly went on to win the WCC 28–20 over the Rhinos.

The 2009 season boded poorly as a result of two incidents on the day of Manly-Warringah's season launch. Second-rower Anthony Watmough was assaulted by a sponsor after allegedly making inappropriate comments to his daughter. Brett Stewart later that night was charged with the sexual assault of a 17-year-old girl outside his apartment block, of which he was subsequently cleared, an incident which led to the damning Four Corners investigation, "Code of Silence". Stewart was cleared of the charge in late September 2010 by a jury which took 45 minutes to reach their decision.

Manly-Warringah paid a $100,000 fine for failing to adequately punish Stewart for his offence. Stewart faced a brief trial at the time, and a further, more comprehensive trial began in March 2010. As a result of Stewart's absence, Manly lost their first four games of the season, crashing to last place after round four (thus becoming the first defending premier since Melbourne in 2000 to lose their first four matches of a season), before finally achieving a 23–10 win against the Tigers in which Stewart scored three tries in his first match for 2009.

A double against Souths followed, before injury struck. Stewart only played five games overall in 2009 following a serious knee injury suffered in round six, before returning in round 25. The Sea Eagles snared fifth place at the end of the season and lost the first qualifying final to eventual grand final winners Melbourne 40–12 in a one-sided contest played at Melbourne's Etihad Stadium. Due to other unfavourable results occurring on the weekend, Manly were eliminated from the premiership race. This premiership was also stripped from the Storm.

=== 2011 season ===
At the end of the 2010 season Manly Warringah lost Trent Hodkinson who signed a deal with the Bulldogs from the start of the 2011 season, as well as Josh Perry and Ben Farrar to the Super League. Daly Cherry-Evans, who came from Manly's Queensland Cup feeder club the Sunshine Coast Sea Eagles, was brought into first grade. Manly-Warringah had not made any big-name signings for the 2011 season. This showed up in its lowly 8th placing, its poorest performance in a season since 2005.

Manly-Warringah's 2011 season started with an 18–6 loss to the Melbourne Storm in Melbourne. Brett Stewart had minimal impact on the match but escaped injury-free. This was followed with an upset 27–16 win over beaten 2010 Grand Finalists the Sydney Roosters, where Manly-Warringah went into the match without its captain Jamie Lyon, Shane Rodney, Dean Whare and Glenn Stewart through injury and also Jason King and Steve Matai through suspension. Brett Stewart was appointed acting captain for the Roosters match. This is regarded as one of the most commendable wins in Manly's history and featured outstanding performances by its younger players including Kieran Foran, Jamie Buhrer, William Hopoate and Vic Mauro. This was followed up with a 26–12 win over the Newcastle Knights at Brookvale, before a 32–20 loss to the South Sydney Rabbitohs which ended Manly's unbeaten run at Bluetongue Stadium, having won all of its previous matches at the venue.

Anthony Watmough and Terence Seu Seu were both stood down by the club for off-field offences prior to its round five match against Cronulla at Toyota Stadium. The Sea Eagles were in trouble midway through the second half, down 13–0, before scoring 19 unanswered points, including a try after the siren by Michael Oldfield, to give the Silvertails a 19–13 victory.

Despite losing many players from the 2010 season, the Sea Eagles found themselves sitting in second place on the NRL Ladder at the end of the regular season, behind the Melbourne Storm. They lost only five matches in the season, all being night matches. Manly-Warringah won all of its matches at Brookvale Oval, again nicknamed "Brookie Fortress". The final game at Brookvale was a Top of the Table Clash against the Melbourne Storm. Manly won this game 18–4 but the win was overshadowed by a brawl between Glenn Stewart and Adam Blair, giving the game the nickname 'The Battle of Brookvale'.

In their opening playoff game, Manly-Warringah registered a 42–8 win over the North Queensland Cowboys at the Sydney Football Stadium. After a disappointing first half, Manly scored 42 unanswered points in the 2nd half, and progressed to the preliminary final. In this match, they defeated the Brisbane Broncos 26–14 to be the first team through to the 2011 NRL Grand Final, where they met the New Zealand Warriors who were vying for their first ever premiership.

A season of success culminated in Manly-Warringah winning its eighth premiership, defeating the New Zealand Warriors 24–10 in the Grand Final. Glenn Stewart was awarded the Clive Churchill Medal for his 34 tackles and a crucial try in the second half. He and brother Brett Stewart became the first brothers to score tries in the same Grand Final. Manly-Warringah's second premiership in four years made them the second team (after the Brisbane Broncos in 2000 and 2006) to win more than one premiership in the 21st century.

Six Weeks after Manly Warringah's premiership win, the club dismissed head coach Des Hasler after he was revealed to have breached his contract by trying to lure coaching staff and players to the Bulldogs where he was to have started coaching in 2013. This meant that Geoff Toovey, who was to take over as part of a succession plan, was immediately elevated to the role of head coach from the start of the 2012 season.

=== 2013 season ===
Ambushed early in the year by the sudden rise of two new title contenders in South Sydney and the Sydney Roosters, Manly spent much of the season flying under the radar with a top four spot safely in their keeping, but minor premiership never truly within their reach.

Having not beaten a fellow top four side all season, they finally did so in style with a 28–8 thrashing of Melbourne in Round 25 to warm up for the finals. Despite facing a number of hurdles through the course of the season – from a lengthy list of injury woes to the ASADA investigation which threatened to become a significant distraction at times – they managed to grow in stature as the season progressed but fell just short, losing the grand final to the Sydney Roosters 26–18.

=== 2021 season ===
Manly didn't start the 2021 NRL season well, losing their first four rounds. The match against Penrith, which they lost 46–6 at Brookvale Oval, was the club's biggest ever home defeat at the ground.

However their season turned around, and by round 16, Manly recorded their biggest ever victory in club history, defeating Canterbury 66–0 at Western Sydney Stadium. After the regular rounds, Manly would finish in the top 4 in 4th place.

The top try scorers for Manly at the end of the Regular Season were Tom Trbojevic with 25 tries, Jason Saab with 23 tries, and Reuben Garrick with 21 tries.

Reuben Garrick became the first player in rugby league to score more than 300 points in a Regular Season. He also became the first player in rugby league history to score 20 tries and 100 goals in a Premiership Season.

After losing in the opening week of the finals against Melbourne, the club won in week two of the finals defeating the Sydney Roosters 42–6. In the preliminary final, the club fell short of reaching the grand final losing to South Sydney 36–16.

=== 2022 season ===
Manly-Warringah didn't start the 2022 NRL season well, losing their first two rounds before winning their next four. Another serious injury to star player Tom Trbojevic in round 11 derailed their season once again with Manly winning only four of their last thirteen games to finish 11th and miss out on the finals. Their season was further marred by an incident when seven players boycotted the round 20 match against the Sydney Roosters due to their refusal to wear the club's "pride" jersey, which was the start of an unfortunate end to the year for the Sea Eagles. On 13 October, the club decided to terminate Des Hasler as head coach.

=== 2023 season ===
Under new head coach Anthony Seibold, the club started strongly recording four wins and one draw from the opening seven games to sit 4th on the table. However, from round 8 until round 20, Manly only recorded three victories. The club would record four wins from their remaining seven matches as they finished in a disappointing 12th place.

=== 2024 season ===
In the 2024 NRL season, Manly would finish 7th on the table and qualified for the finals. The club would defeat Canterbury in week one of the finals but their season was ended the following week by the Sydney Roosters.

=== 2025 season ===
Manly endured a difficult campaign in the 2025 NRL season finishing 10th on the table. Early in the year, the club was rocked by the news that long serving captain Daly Cherry-Evans was departing the club after failing to reach a new contract deal. Canberra Raiders halfback Jamal Fogarty would be announced in May as the replacement halfback for Cherry-Evans, signing a 3 year deal. Head coach Anthony Seibold's position also came up for debate as supporters of the club and sections of the media called for him to be terminated. In November, Manly announced that Jason King a former player for the team would be appointed the clubs CEO after the departure Tony Mestrov. On that same month, Manly announced that Tom Trbojevic will be replacing Cherry-Evans as captain, despite signing a new deal last month to extend his stay until the end of the 2027 season.

=== 2026 ===
After three straight losses to start the season, including a 33-16 defeat to the Sydney Roosters led by former captain Daly Cherry-Evans, the club announced on 27 March that Anthony Seibold would be dismissed from his role as head coach. It was later confirmed on 28 March that Kieran Foran would be appointed as interim head coach for the remainder of the season.

In June 2026, Manly confirmed that Foran would stay on as their permanent Head Coach of the club until the end of 2029, after an impressive 7-2 start to his coaching tenure at the club. Manly would eventually finish 9th on the table narrowly missing out on the finals.

Pos	Team	Pld	W	D	L	B	PF	PA	PD	Pts	Qualification
1	Penrith Panthers	24	18	0	6	3	683	347	+336	42	Advance to finals series
2	New Zealand Warriors	24	18	0	6	3	728	418	+310	42	Advance to finals series
3	Dolphins	24	17	0	7	3	662	506	+156	40	Advance to finals series
4	Sydney Roosters (P)	24	16	0	8	3	619	501	+118	38	Advance to finals series
5	Cronulla-Sutherland Sharks	24	14	0	10	3	672	523	+149	34	Advance to finals series
6	South Sydney Rabbitohs	24	14	0	10	3	694	581	+113	34	Advance to finals series
7	Newcastle Knights	24	14	0	10	3	633	591	+42	34	Advance to finals series
8	North Queensland Cowboys	24	13	0	11	3	568	652	−84	32	Advance to finals series
9	Manly Warringah Sea Eagles	24	11	0	13	3	623	524	+99	28	
10	Melbourne Storm	24	11	0	13	3	594	576	+18	28	
11	Canberra Raiders	24	11	0	13	3	581	626	−45	28	
12	Canterbury-Bankstown Bulldogs	24	11	0	13	3	476	536	−60	28	
13	Parramatta Eels	24	9	0	15	3	497	678	−181	24	
14	Brisbane Broncos	24	8	0	16	3	471	677	−206	22	
15	Wests Tigers	24	8	0	16	3	445	699	−254	22	
16	Gold Coast Titans	24	6	0	18	3	477	663	−186	18	
17	St. George Illawarra Dragons	24	5	0	19	3	392	717	−325	16	

Source: National Rugby League
Rules for classification: 1) competition points; 2) points differential; 3) percentage; (Note: Greater percentage of points scored for and against, being determined by points scored for divided by points scored against expressed as a percentage.) 4) tries scored; (Note: Further tiebreakers (in order) include goals scored, field goals kicked; least amount of penalties conceded.)
(P) Premiers

== Emblem and colours ==
Manly Warringah Sea Eagles – Logos

1947–1955

1980-1997

1998-1999

2003–2023

2024–present

The team has always been officially known as the "Manly Warringah Sea Eagles" since 1947.

Upon entering the NSWRL, Manly took on the colours of maroon and white. Manly chose the sea eagle – the native bird of prey on the Sydney coastline – as its emblem. The club's first jersey was maroon with a large white 'V' on the front. Manly were one of the first teams to feature an emblem, with an 'MW' appearing in the early 1950s. The 'Sea Eagle' has appeared on all jerseys since the mid-1950s. Several iterations of the sea eagle logo would appear over the years. From the 1980s, Manly would go on to use perhaps their most famous of logos used in what is regarded as their most successful years up until the creation of the new competition.

In conjunction with the new competition, the National Rugby League, Manly would change their logo in 1998. It featured predominantly maroon, white, yellow and blue to symbolise the connection the club had with its major sponsor at the time Pepsi. This logo would not last however when the ill-fated merger with North Sydney Bears in 2000 saw them take on the Northern Eagles moniker instead.

Upon their return in 2003, Manly opted to revert to the previous logo but slightly updated to focus on the sea eagle and include Warringah in the club's name again. They also returned to their original colours, however a darker shade of maroon and white, a symbol of their roots stemming back from 1947.

In October 2023, Manly unveiled their new identity and emblem with a fresh, modern look, whilst also paying homage to the Club's rich history. The new logo carried forward traditional Maroon and White colours and elements of the past Manly emblems including a familiar circular motif that the Sea Eagles have incorporated since 1978, whilst focusing on the sea eagle head with simplified details.

=== Jerseys ===
Manly Warringah Sea Eagles – Jerseys

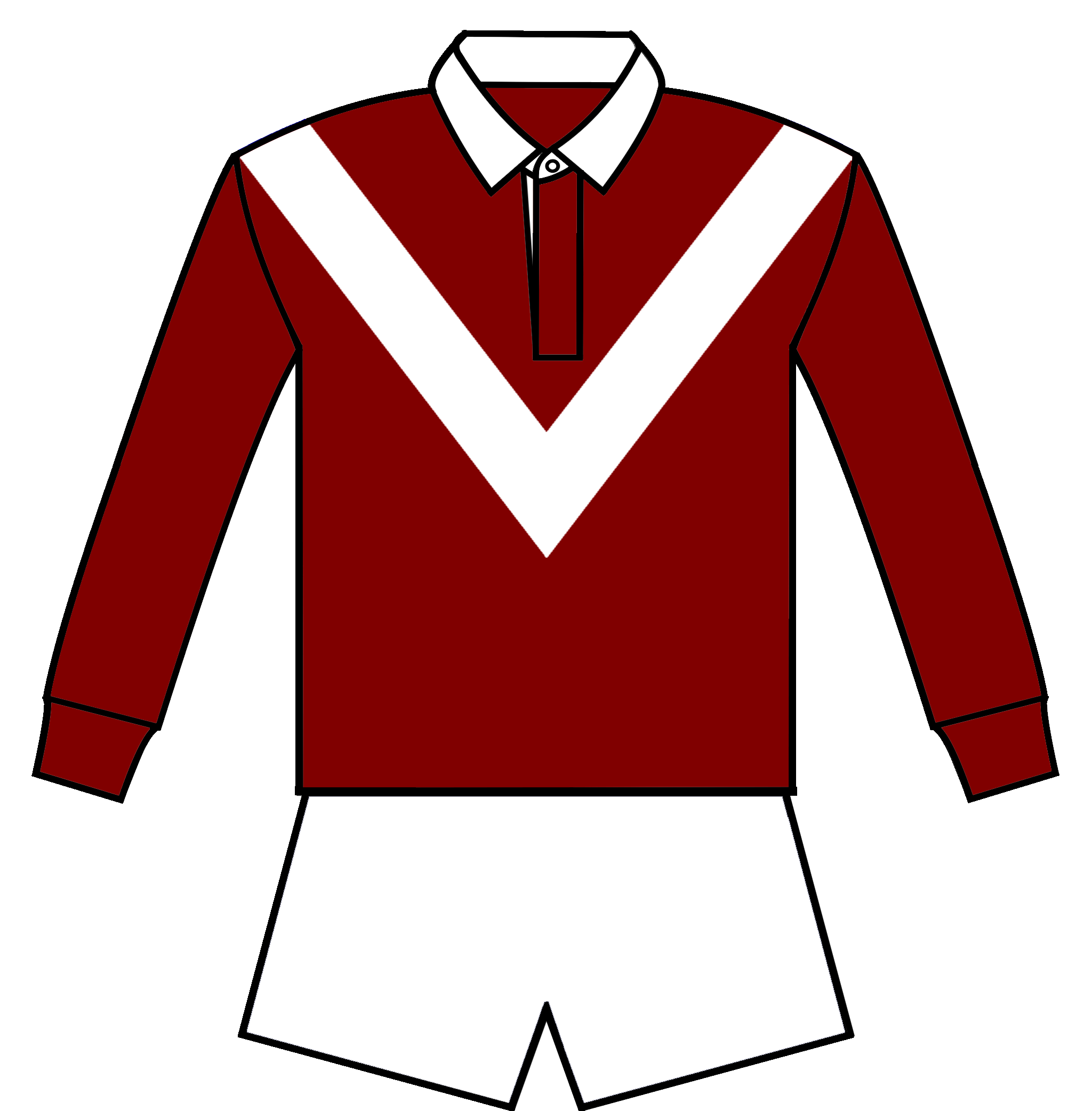
1947–1950

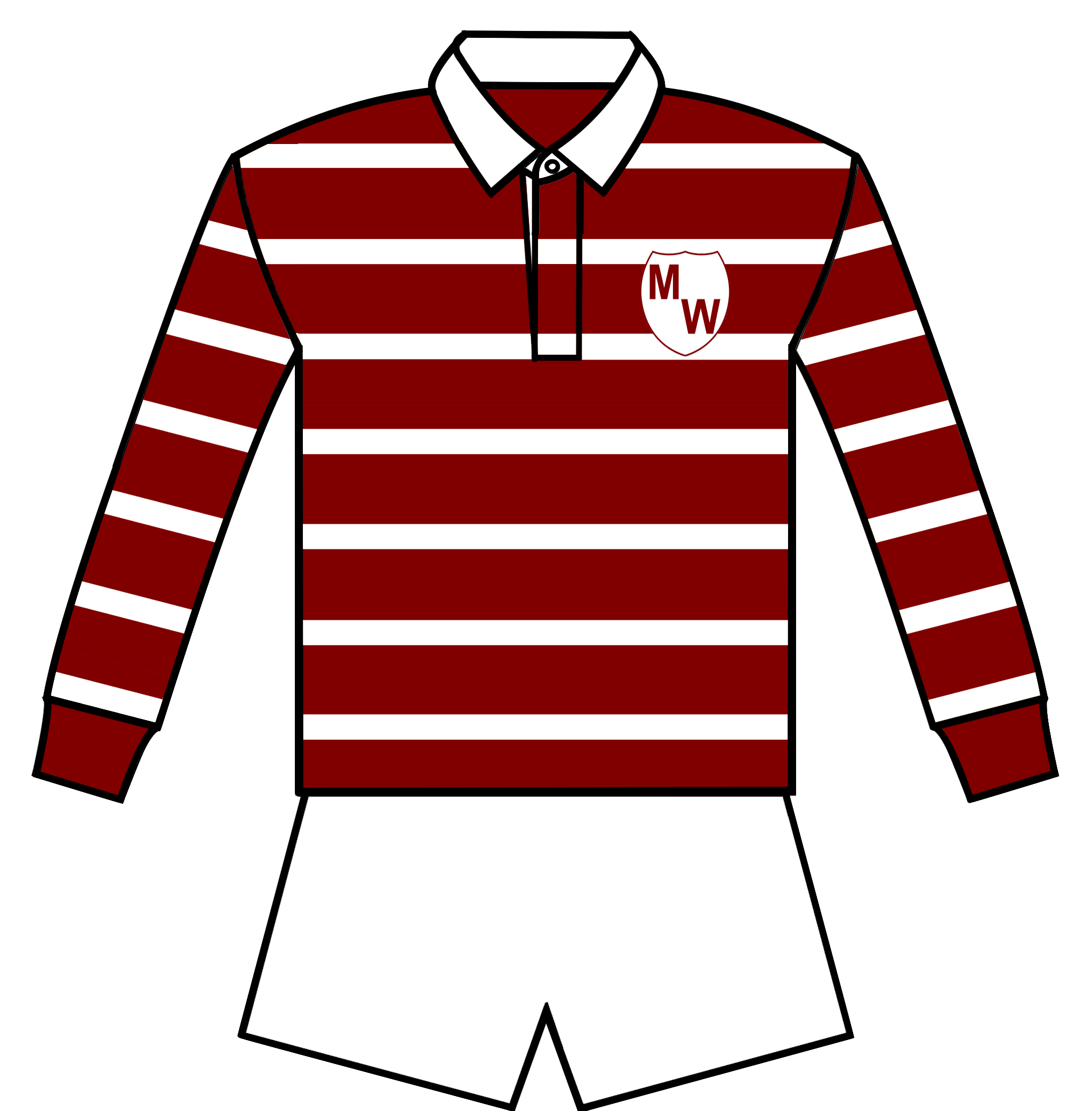
1951–1956

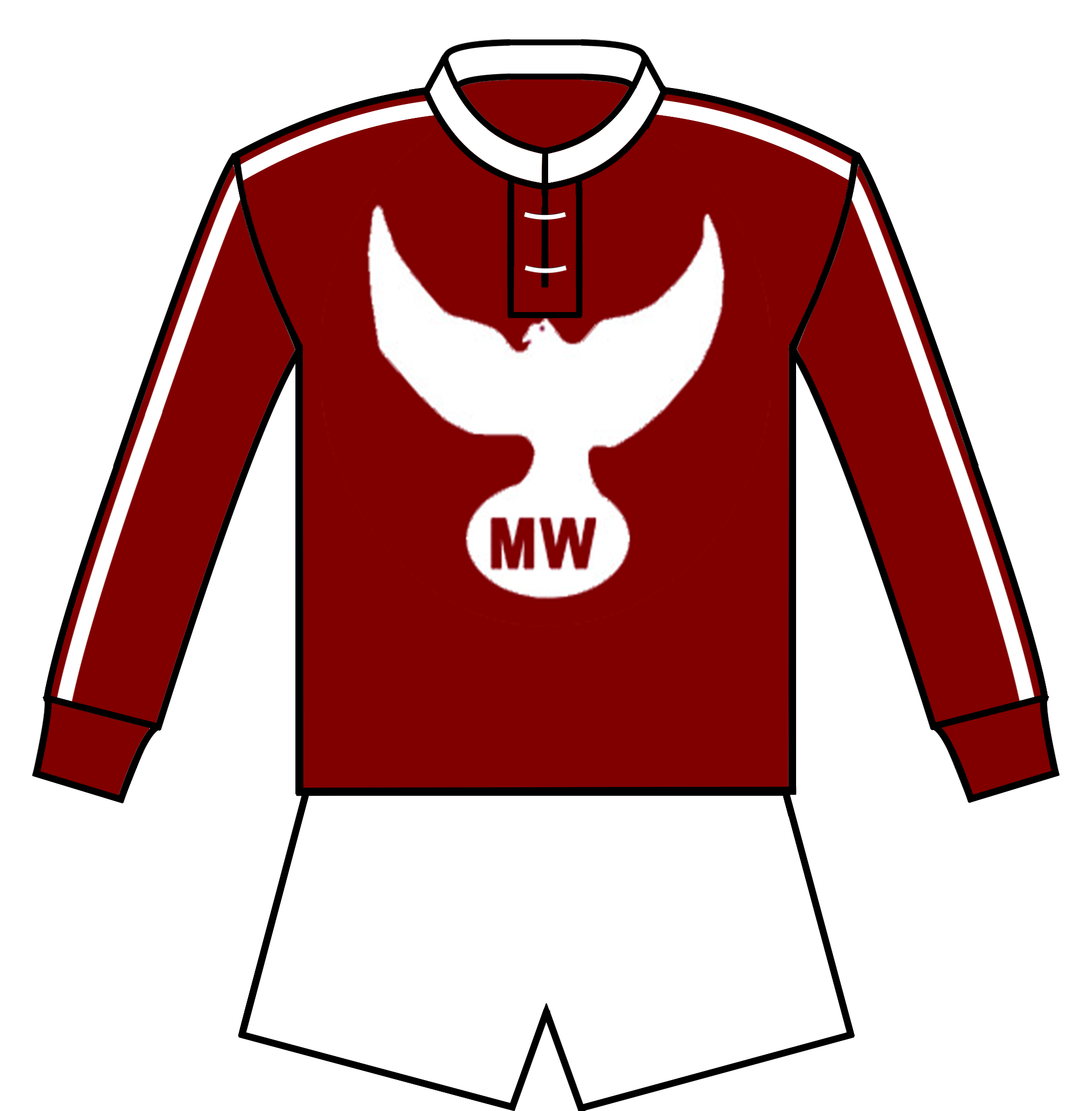
1957–1964

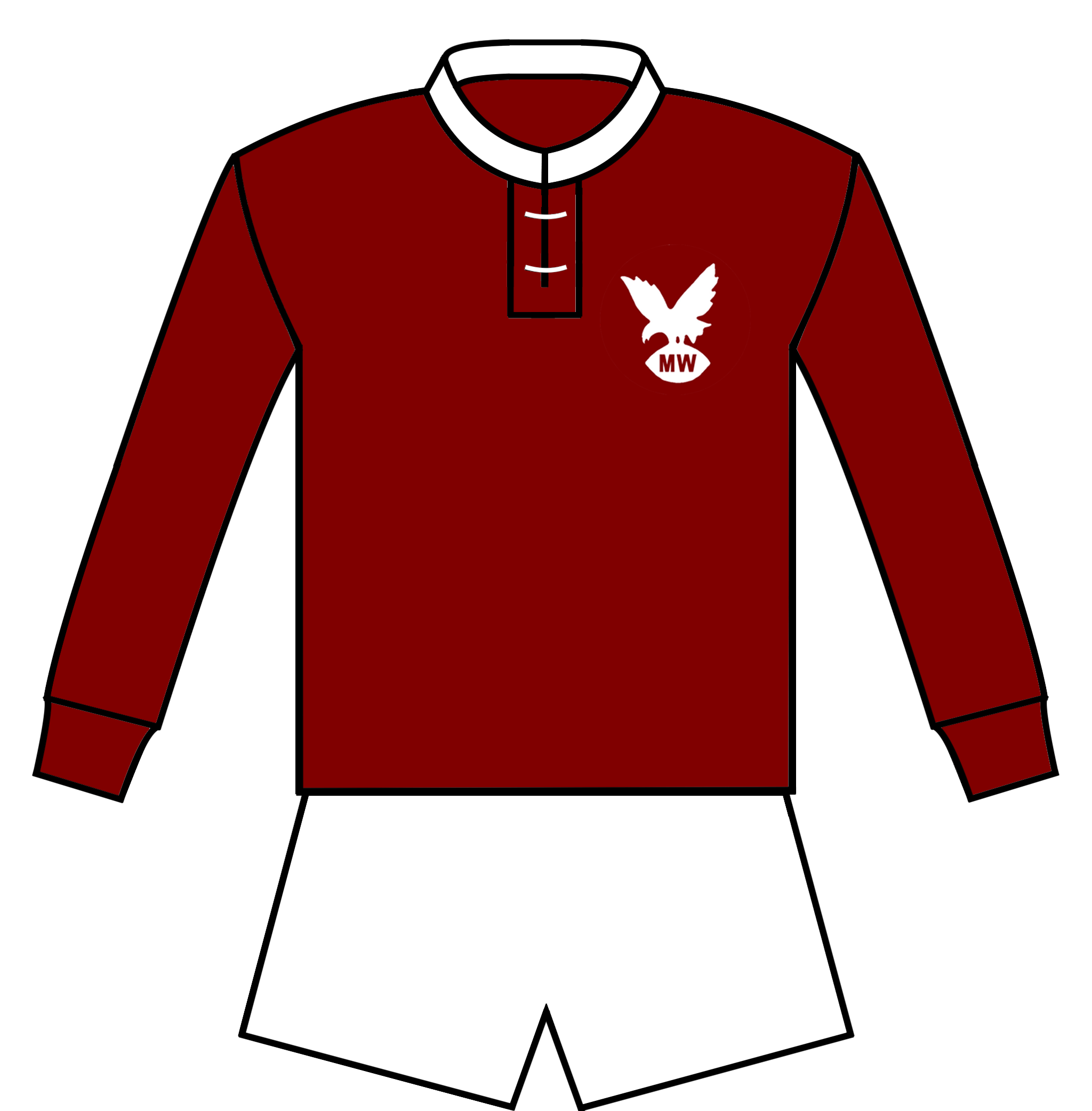
1965–1967

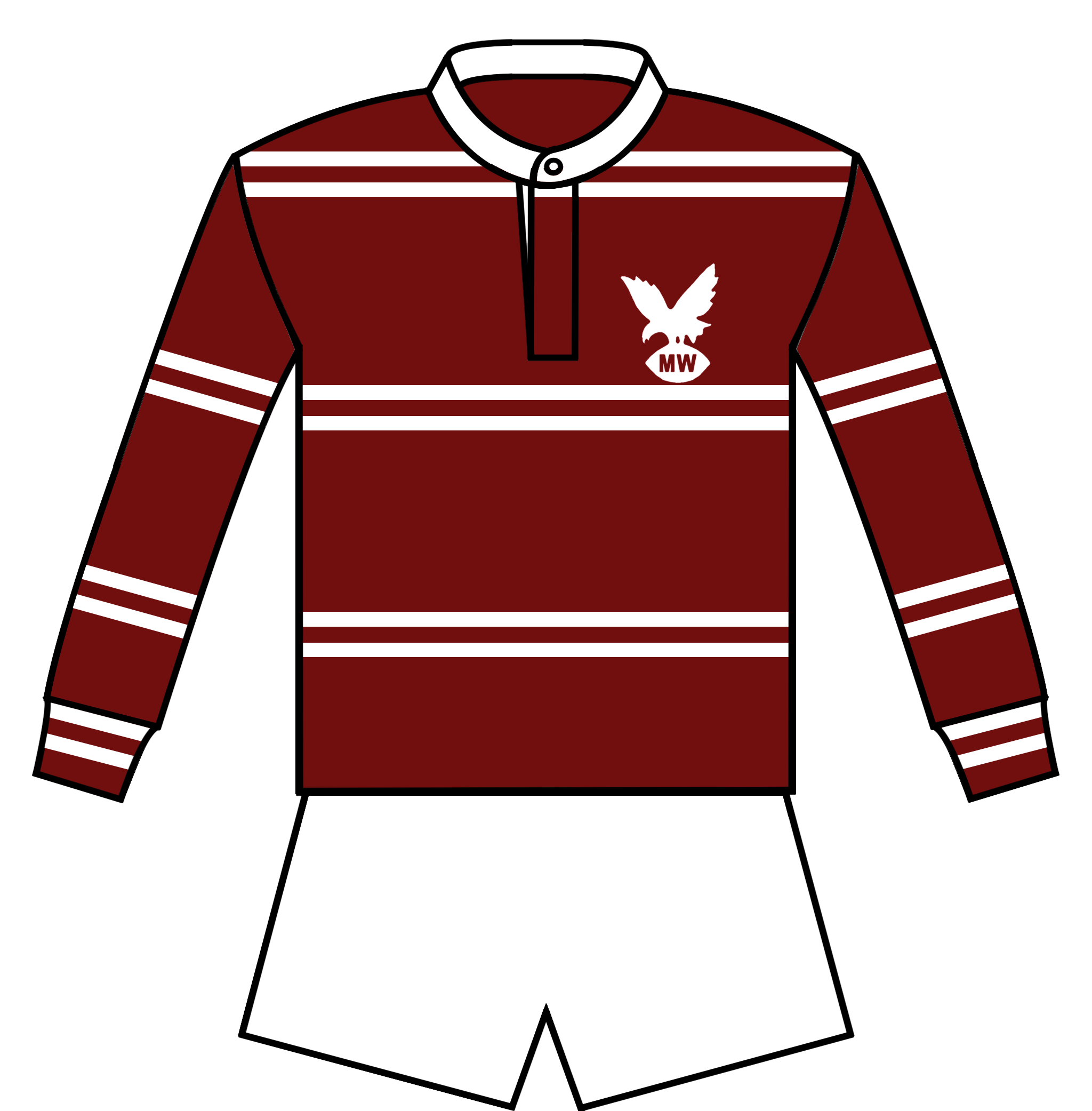
1968–1975

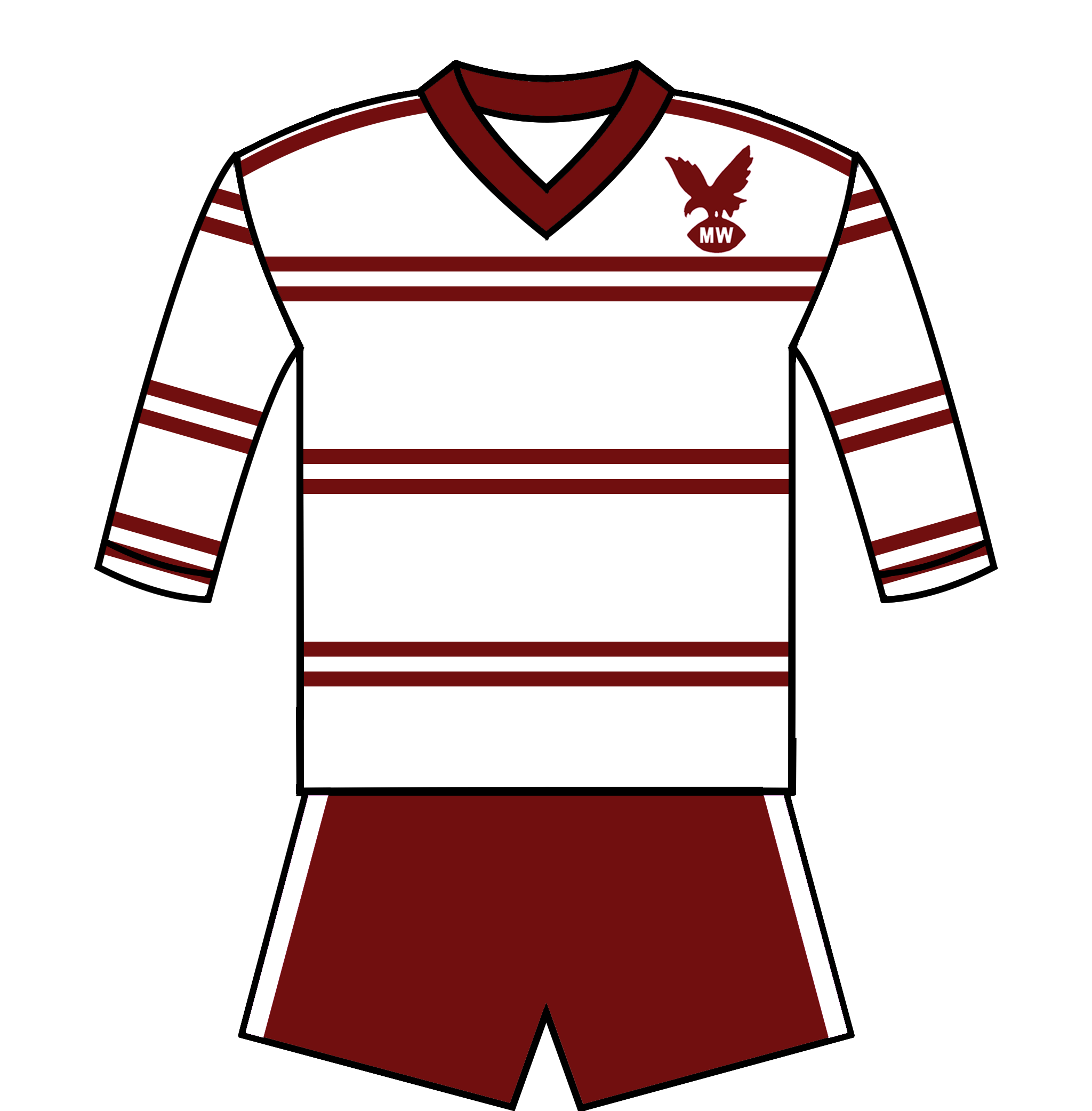
1976–1984

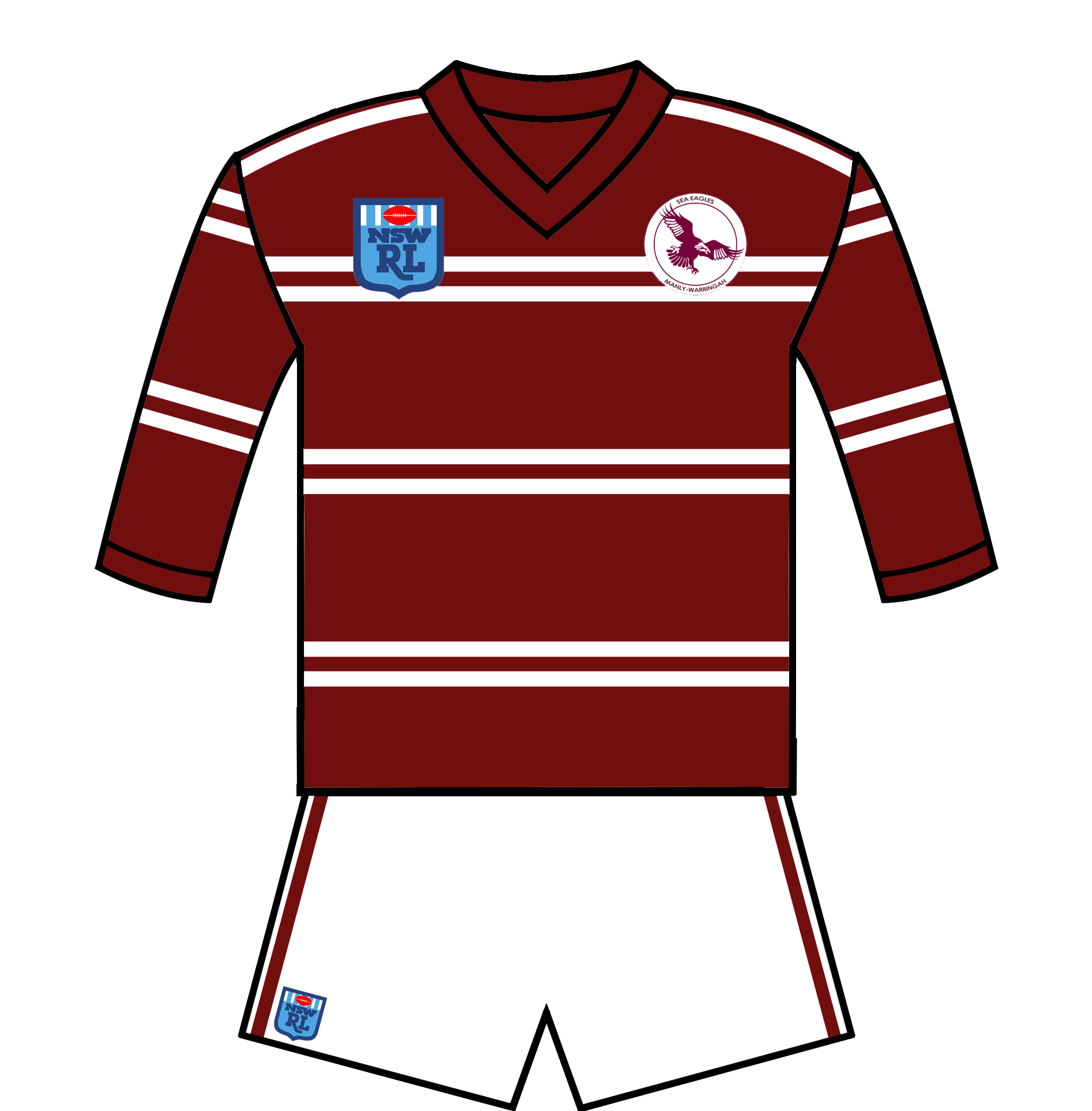
1985–1992

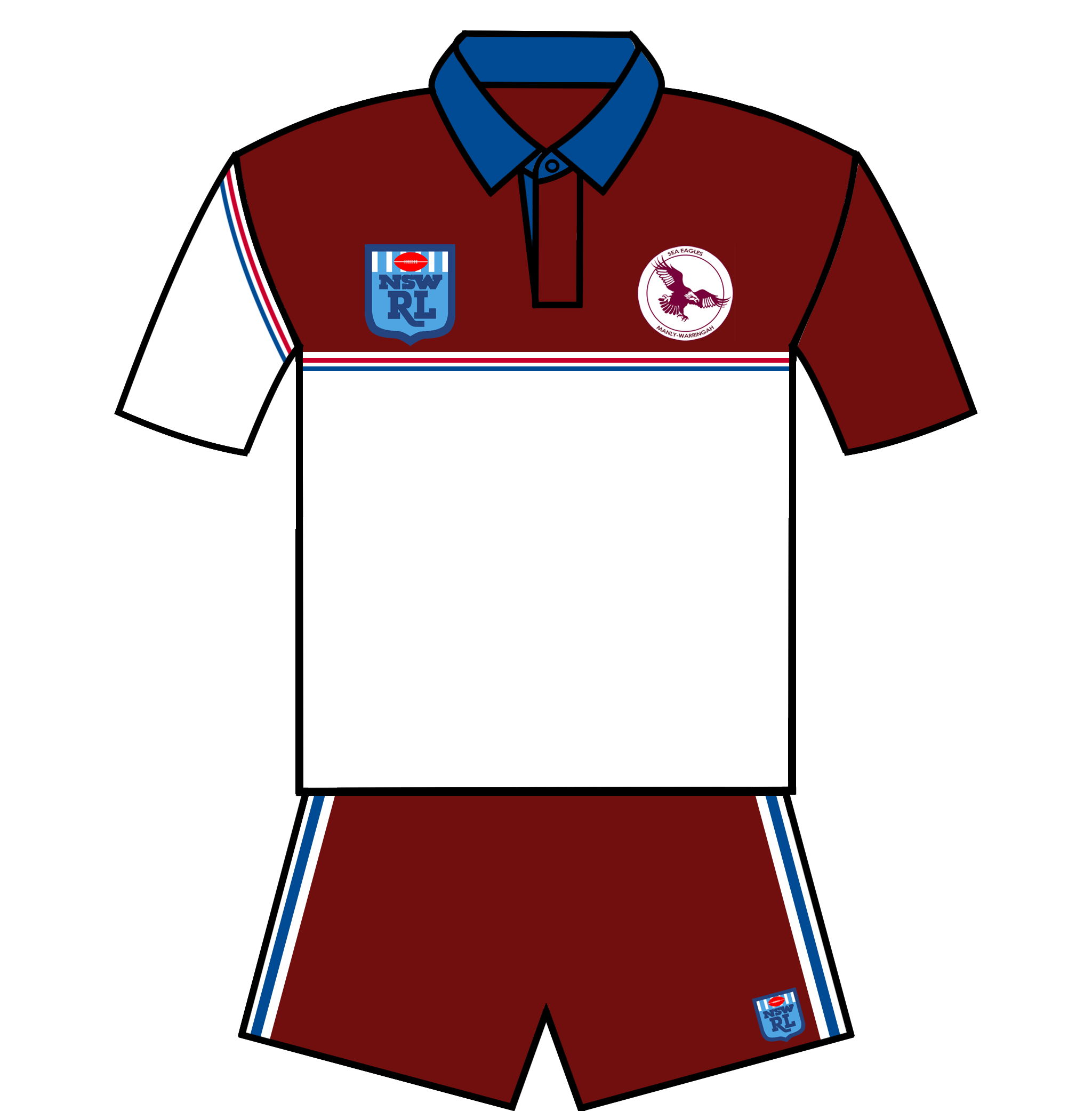
1993–1997

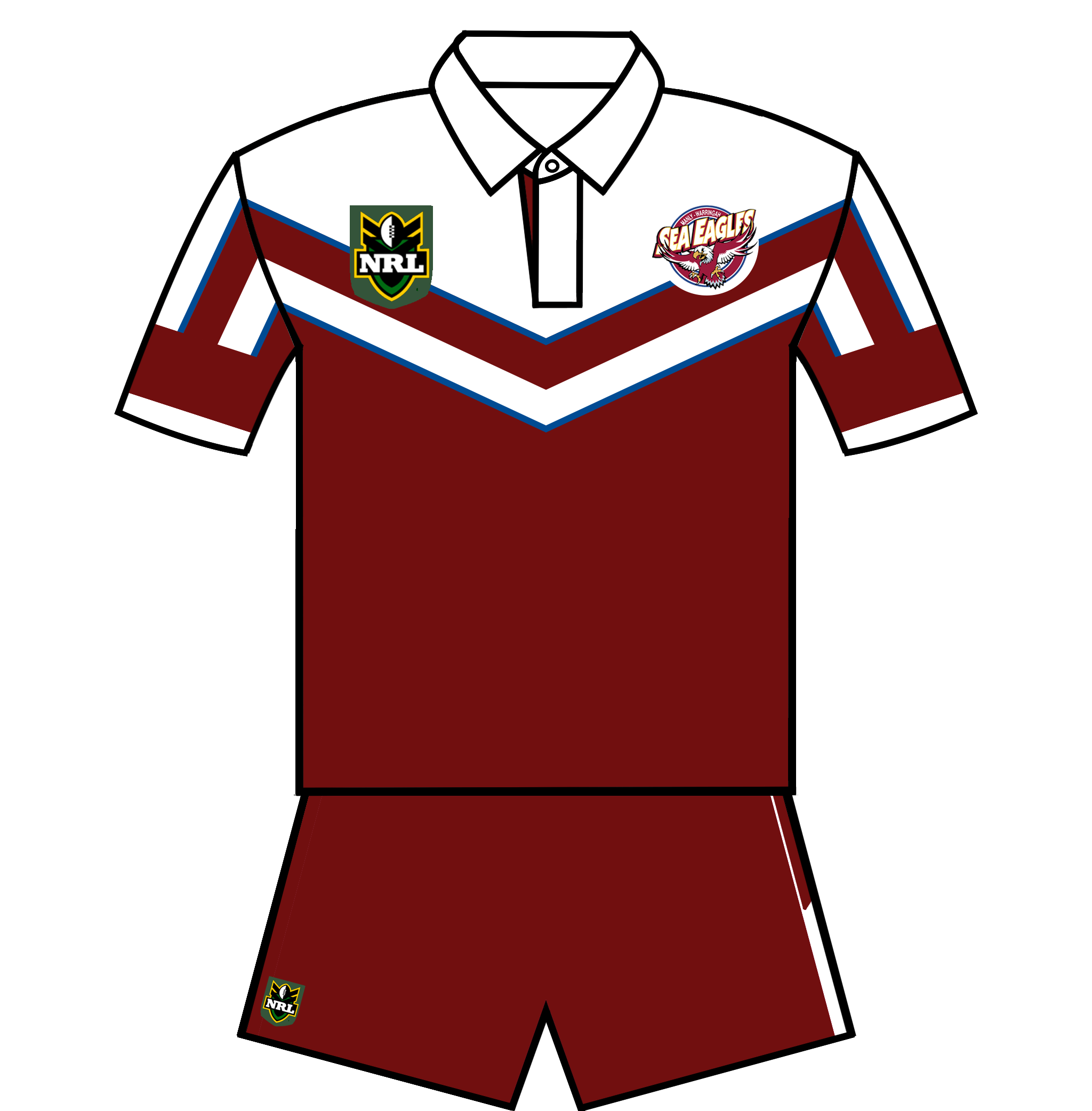
1998–1999

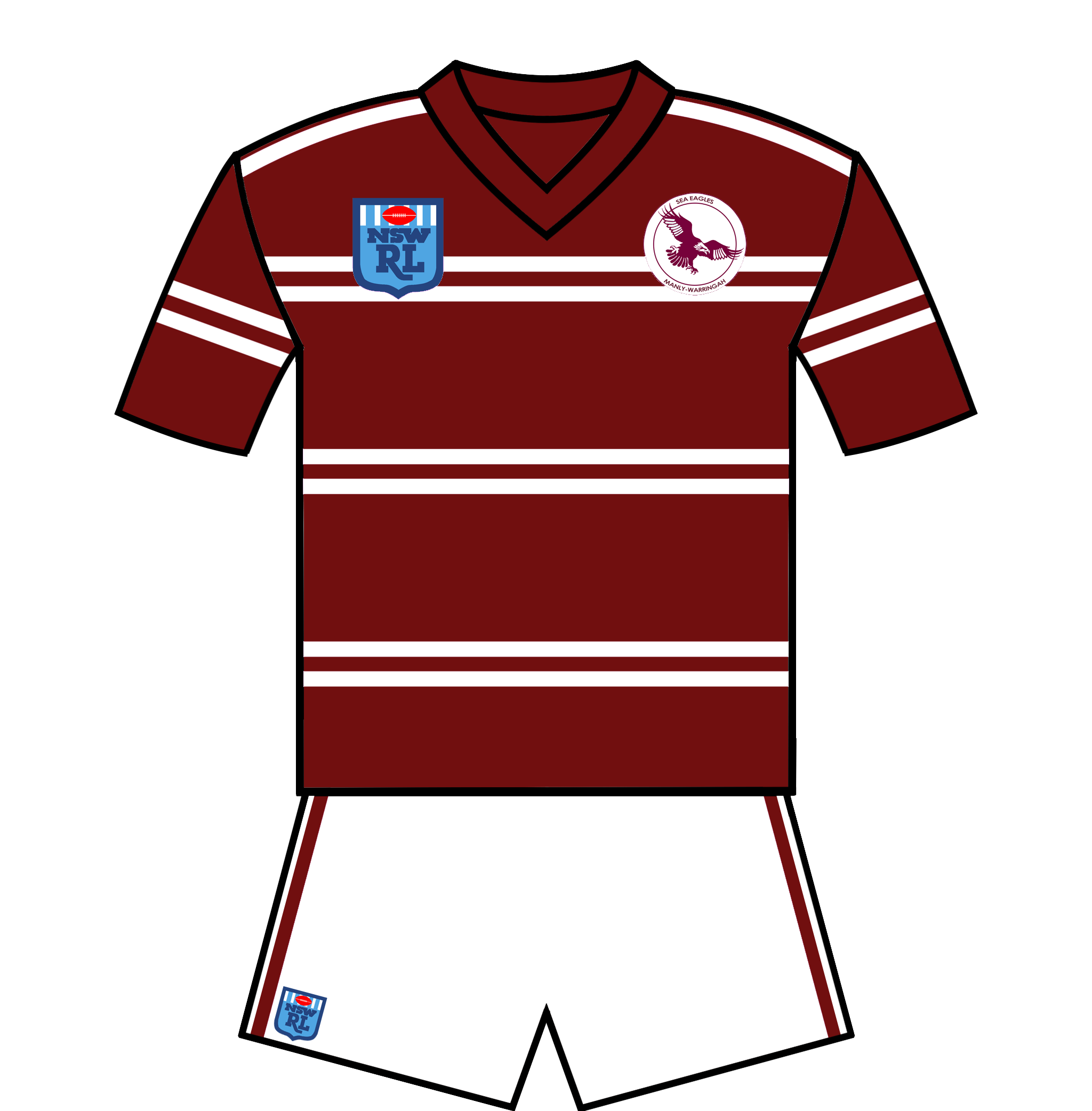
2020–present

=== Kit sponsors and manufacturers ===
Year	Kit Manufacturer	Major Sponsor	Back Top Sponsor	Sleeve Sponsor	Back Bottom Sponsor	Front Shorts Sponsor	Back Shorts Sponsor	Chest Sponsor
1976–82	Classic Sportswear	Pioneer Stereo	Pioneer Stereo	—	—	—	—	—
1983-88	Classic Sportswear	Wormald	Wormald	—	—	—	—	—
1989	Classic Sportswear	ADT	ADT	—	—	—	—	—
1990	Classic Sportswear	P&O Cruises	P&O Cruises	—	—	—	—	—
1991-92	Classic Sportswear	P&O Cruises	P&O Cruises	Manchester Unity	—	—	—	—
1993-94	Classic Sportswear	Pepsi	Pepsi	Lion Red	—	Pepsi	—	—
1995-97	Classic Sportswear	Pepsi	Pepsi	Fujifilm	—	Pepsi	—	—
1998	Classic Sportswear	FAI	FAI	Fujifilm	—	—-	—	—
1999	Nike	FAI	FAI	Fujifilm	—	FAI	—	—
2003	Classic Sportswear	Delmege Commercial	Delmege Commercial	TJF-EBC	—	The Loan Inquiry Centre	The Loan Inquiry Centre	—
2004	Classic Sportswear	Delmege Commercial	Delmege Commercial	Dairy Farmers	—	The Loan Inquiry Centre	The Loan Inquiry Centre	—
2005	Classic Sportswear	Delmege Commercial	Delmege Commercial	Dairy Farmers	—	Reed Constructions	Reed Constructions	—
2006	Reebok	Delmege Commercial	Delmege Commercial	Strathfield	QLD Group	Reed Constructions	Reed Constructions	—
2007	Reebok	Delmege Commercial	Delmege Commercial	Strathfield	Harbord Diggers	Reed Constructions	Reed Constructions	—
2008	Reebok	Delmege Commercial	Penn Health	Mack Trucks	Viva Macau (Regular Season) Sydney Children's Hospital (Finals)	Reed Constructions	Reed Constructions	—
2009	Reebok	Quantam Eco Hot Water	Penn Health	Mack Trucks	Manly Leagues	Reed Constructions	Reed Constructions	—
2010	ISC	Quantam Eco Hot Water	Penn Health	AAA Radiators	Alsafe Security	Reed Constructions	Reed Constructions	—
2011	ISC	Kaspersky Internet Security	Centrebet	AAA Radiators	Alsafe Security	Reed Constructions	Reed Constructions/Stewart House	—
2012	ISC	Kaspersky Internet Security	Centrebet	AAA Radiators	StreetSmart Energy	Stewart House	aussieBum/AVS Security	—
2013	ISC	Kaspersky Internet Security	Centrebet	AAA Radiators	Soniq	NeuroSpinology	Mentor1/AVS Security	United Resource Management
2014	ISC	Kaspersky Internet Security	Daikin	AAA Radiators	Soniq	Kyocera	Kyocera	United Resource Management
2015	ISC	Kaspersky Internet Security	Daikin	Coco Joy	Soniq	Kyocera	Kyocera	United Resource Management
2016	ISC	Coco Joy	Daikin	ZTE	Kyocera	Firths Lawyers	Firths Lawyers	United Resource Management
2017	ISC	United Resource Management	Lottoland	ZTE	ClickFit.com	Thompson Health Care	Deppro	—
2018	ISC	United Resource Management	Lottoland	Shaw and Partners	QMS Sport	Aussie Gems	TFH Hire Services	Shaw and Partners
2019	ISC	United Resource Management	TripADeal	Shaw and Partners	Zantac	Soul Origin	TFH Hire Services	Shaw and Partners
2020	Dynasty Sport	United Resource Management	TripADeal	Shaw and Partners	Sarraf Strata	Get Picked Up	TFH Hire Services	Shaw and Partners
2021	Dynasty Sport	United Resource Management	TripADeal	Shaw and Partners	Sarraf Strata	Industree Group	TFH Hire Services	Shaw and Partners
2022	Dynasty Sport	Pointsbet	TripADeal	Shaw and Partners	Pointsbet	Industree Group	United Resource Management	Shaw and Partners
2023	Dynasty Sport	Pointsbet	TripADeal (Home) Industree Group (Away)	Shaw and Partners	Pointsbet	KFC	United Resource Management	Shaw and Partners
2024	Dynasty Sport	Pointsbet	TripADeal	Shaw and Partners	KFC	SAS Water Solutions	United Resource Management	Shaw and Partners
2025	Dynasty Sport	United Resource Management	TripADeal	Shaw and Partners	KFC	Zantac	New Age Veneers/Mann Group	Shaw and Partners
2026-	Dynasty Sport	United Resource Management	TBA	Shaw and Partners	KFC	Mann Group	Zantac/New Age Veneers	Shaw and Partners

== Manly Leagues Club ==
Manly Warringah Rugby Leagues Club (known as Manly Leagues) is one of the leading clubs on Sydney's northern beaches. The Leagues Club has also acquired Dee Why Bowling Club to the Manly Leagues brand, which amalgamated in 2022.

Manly Leagues enjoy a close association with the Manly Warringah Sea Eagles. The club's charter includes the support of rugby league in the local area and the outstanding history of the Sea Eagles highlights the success of this support.

== Stadium ==
When Manly-Warringah was admitted into the competition and over its first seasons it was desirous of obtaining use of Manly Oval as their home ground, however the lease of the ground from Manly Council was held by Manly rugby union club who refused to grant any match days to rugby league. The home field of the Manly-Warringah Junior Rugby League (the body who successfully secured the club's 1947 admission to first grade) had since at least 1939 been Brookvale Oval. The Sea Eagles home games were as a result in 1947 played at Brookvale Oval and the club has remained there ever since.

Brookvale Oval (officially known as 4 Pines Park) is as of 2025, an 18,000-capacity rectangular stadium that has been the home of the Sea Eagles since 1947, with the venue last redeveloped in 2022 with the opening of the Bob Fulton Stand.

The ground now features four grandstands: the Jane Try Stand, which runs along the western side and is the largest; the Ken Arthurson Stand, located in the southwest corner and named after the long-serving Manly, NSWRL, and ARL administrator; the Lyons-Menzies Stand, situated at the southern end and named after champion Manly players Steve Menzies and Cliff Lyons; and the new 3,000-seat Bob Fulton Stand at the northern end, which incorporates the club's centre of excellence. A grass hill runs along the eastern side of the ground, and the venue also features broadcast-quality lights and a video screen.

Brookvale Oval has often been regarded as a graveyard for many opposition teams, earning it the nickname 'Fortress Brookvale.'

The record crowd at the ground is 27,655, set in the final round of the 1986 season against traditional rivals, the Parramatta Eels. Since the club started playing in 1947, over six million spectators have visited the ground.

Of the permanent venues used by the NRL, Brookvale Oval ranks second for the most games played, with 720 games, behind only Leichhardt Oval (as of October 2023).

=== Naming rights ===
In February 2017, a 3-year $1 million naming rights deal with Lottoland, renamed Brookvale Oval to "Lottoland". In August 2019 Lottoland group exercised its option to extend the sponsorship contract, worth $500,000 for another year to the end of the 2020 season. The final game to be played under the name "Lottoland" was in Round 9, 2021 of the NRL between the Sea Eagles and New Zealand Warriors.

In June 2021, a 4-year deal was signed with 4 Pines Brewing Company to be named "4 Pines Park"

In January 2025, before the start of the new season, the Sea Eagles and 4 Pines Brewing Co. announced the renewal of the stadium naming rights partnership, extending the agreement for 4 Pines Park to the end of the 2027 season.

4 Pines has proudly held the naming rights to the Northern Beaches local iconic Brookvale Oval, now known as 4 Pines Park, since 2021.

== Administration and facilities ==
In March 2022, the Centre of Excellence at the western end of the oval, formerly home to the 'Family Hill' was opened. The club moved all training and administration operations to this new, 4-storey building as well as the centre providing approximately 3,000 seats and premium hospitality spaces to be utilised on match day. The centre of excellence features change rooms, pools, a gym, training and medical spaces and general administration areas for staff to utilise.

In round 3 of the 2022 NRL season, Manly played their first match back at the redeveloped Brookvale Oval defeating Canterbury-Bankstown 13–12.

== Local catchment area ==
Historically, Manly has had a rich history of local juniors representing the first grade side, including former Australian, State and Club captains Max Krilich and Geoff Toovey. Other notable former local juniors include 4-time Premiership winners Ian Martin and Terry Randall and 2-time Premiership winners Steven Menzies and Anthony Watmough.

Local rugby league clubs play within the joint Manly-Warringah/North Sydney District Rugby League district competition. And teams are identified with either Norths or Manly, with teams in the Manly, Warringah and Pittwater (Northern Beaches and Forest District) districts wearing the Manly logo, whilst teams in the North Sydney (North Shore and Hornsby Shire) district compete with the North Sydney logo.

=== Notable former local juniors ===
- Ken Arthurson – Freshwater SLSC
- Keith Blackett – Manly RUFC
- Phil Blake – Manly Christian Brothers RLFC
- Michael Blake – Forestville Ferrets JRLFC
- Johnny Bliss – North Narrabeen SLSC
- Bill Bradstreet – Manly Christian Brothers RLFC
- Darren Bradstreet – Manly Christian Brothers RLFC
- John Bucknall – Manly Christian Brothers RLFC
- Roy Bull – Freshwater SLSC
- Peter Burke – Manly Christian Brothers RLFC
- Rick Chisholm – Harbord United Devils
- Wayne Chisholm – Harbord United Devils
- Ivan Cleary – Narraweena Hawks
- Anthony Colella – Manly Christian Brothers RLFC
- Mitchell Cox – Balgowlah Boys High, RU
- Greg Cross – Harbord United Devils
- Adam Cuthbertson – Avalon Bulldogs
- Peter Cullum - Beacon Hill Bears
- Phil Daley – Harbord United Devils
- Stuart Davis
- Matt Dunford – Cromer Kingfishers
- Dragan Durdevic – Narrabeen Sharks
- Mike Eden - Beacon Hill Bears
- Jack Elsegood – Narrabeen Sharks
- Scott Fulton – Manly Christian Brothers RLFC
- Brett Fulton – Manly Christian Brothers RLFC
- Daniel Gartner – Narrabeen Sharks
- Russel Gartner – Narrabeen Sharks
- Ian Gately – St Augustine's College, Sydney
- John Gibbs – Narrabeen Sharks
- Mathew Guberina – Warringah RU
- Tony Jensen
- Cooper Johns – Narraweena Hawks
- Jack Johns – Harbord United Devils
- Fred Jones – Brookvale
- John Jones – Manly Christian Brothers RLFC
- Craig Hancock – Narraweena Hawks
- Robert Hardie – Narraweena Hawks
- Sam Harris – Avalon Bulldogs
- John Harvey
- Terry Hill – North Curl Curl Knights
- Jamil Hopoate – Beacon Hill Bears
- John Hopoate – Manly Cove Rebels
- William Hopoate – Manly Cove Rebels
- Nik Kosef – Manly Christian Brothers RLFC
- Jason King – Belrose Eagles
- Stephen Knight – Manly RUFC
- Max Krilich – Harbord United Devils
- Darcy Lussick – Beacon Hill Bears
- Adam MacDougall – Harbord United Devils
- Ian Martin – Narraweena Hawks
- Vic Mauro – North Curl Curl Knights
- Tony Mestrov – Narrabeen Sharks
- Steven Menzies – Harbord United Devils
- Chris Montgomery – Narrabeen Sharks
- John Morgan – Collaroy SLSC
- Derek Moritz – North Curl Curl Knights
- Matt Nable – Manly Christian Brothers RLFC
- Adam Nable – Manly Christian Brothers RLFC
- Chris Nero – Manly Christian Brothers RLFC
- Shannon Nevin – Manly Christian Brothers RLFC
- Michael Oldfield – Harbord United Devils
- Brad Parker – Manly Christian Brothers RLFC
- Chad Randall – North Curl Curl Knights
- Terry Randall – North Curl Curl Knights
- Ray Ritchie
- David Ronson – Belrose Eagles
- Chris Ryan – Belrose Eagles
- Glenn Ryan – Forestville Ferrets JRLFC
- Warren Simmons – Manly Christian Brothers RLFC
- Wayne Springall
- Frank Stanton – Belrose Eagles
- Frank Stokes – Manly Cove Rebels
- Josh Stuart – Manly Christian Brothers RLFC
- Fred Teasdell – Forestville Ferrets JRLFC
- Alan Thomson – Narrabeen Sharks
- Gary Thoroughgood – Harbord United Devils
- Sean Townsend – Narrabeen Sharks
- Geoff Toovey – Belrose Eagles
- Rex Mossop – Manly RUFC
- Anthony Watmough – Narrabeen Sharks
- Max Whitehead – Narrabeen Sharks
- Mark Willoughby
- Fred Yakich – Narrabeen Sharks
- Nick Yakich – Narrabeen Sharks

Current (2025) NRL players: (unless Manly, current club in brackets)

- Clint Gutherson – Cromer Kingfishers (St George Illawarra Dragons)
- Josh Feledy - Beacon Hill Bears
- Jacob Preston – Belrose Eagles (Canterbury-Bankstown Bulldogs)
- Albert Hopoate – Beacon Hill Bears (Canberra Raiders)
- Lehi Hopoate – Beacon Hill Bears
- Freddy Lussick - Beacon Hill Bears ( Penrith Panthers )
- Joey Lussick – Beacon Hill Bears (Parramatta Eels)
- Savelio Tamale – Cromer Kingfishers (Canberra Raiders)
- Ben Trbojevic – Mona Vale Raiders
- Jake Trbojevic – Mona Vale Raiders
- Tom Trbojevic – Mona Vale Raiders
- Sam Verrills – Avalon Bulldogs (Gold Coast Titans)
- Joey Walsh – Narraweena Hawks
- Kaeo Weekes - Asquith Magpies ( Canberra Raiders )

== Players ==
=== squad ===
Manly Warringah Sea Eagles 2026 squad
Top 30 squad – 2026 NRL season			Supplementary list	Coaching staff
Luke Brooks – FE; Nathan Brown – PR; Paul Bryan – PR; Ethan Bullemor – PR; Zach Dockar-Clay – HK; Clayton Faulalo – FB, CE, WG; Jamal Fogarty – HB (gk); Reuben Garrick – CE (gk); Kobe Hetherington – PR; Lehi Hopoate – WG, FB	Tolutau Koula – CE, FB, WG; Simione Laiafi – PR; Onitoni Large – FE; Zaidas Muagututia – HK; Caleb Navale – LK; Haumole Olakau'atu (vc) – SR; Taniela Paseka – PR; Jason Saab – WG; Aaron Schoupp – SR; Jake Simpkin – HK	Sio Siua Taukeiaho – PR; Ben Trbojevic – SR; Jake Trbojevic (c) – LK; Tom Trbojevic (c) – FB; Corey Waddell – SR; Joey Walsh – FE, HB; Navren Willett – WG; Blake Wilson – WG	Josh Feledy – CE; Hugo Hart – SR; Mia Pua'avase – LK; Jackson Shereb – SR; Brandon Wakeham – HK; Extended squad: Fletcher Baker – SR; Nic Lenaz – HK	Manager: Sir Stephen Hansen (Football Performance Director); Head coach: Kieran Foran; Assistant coach: Jim Dymock (Assistant Coach); Brent Kite (Assistant / Middle Forwards Coach); David Penna (NSW Cup & Transition Coach); Lachlan Croker (Coaching Pathways Transition); Jarrod Croker (Goal Kicking Coach); Paul Devlin (High Performance Consultant); Albert Chang (Strength & Power Coach); Legend: (c) Captain(s); (vc) Vice-captain(s); Updated: 22 November 2026; Source(s): Sea Eagles team profiles, Sea Eagles 2024

=== Past players ===
The first Manly-Warringah team to play in the NSWRFL Premiership on 12 April 1947 was:

No.

Position
Player

1 Albert Collins – FB 2 Jim Walsh – WG 3 Kelly McMahon – CE 4 Mackie Campbell – CE 5 Johnny Bliss – WG 6 Merv Gillmer – FE 7 Gary Maddrell – HB 8 Harry Grew – LK 9 Ern Cannon – SR

No.

Position
Player

10 Pat Hines – SR 11 Max Whitehead – PR (c) 12 Keith Kirkwood – HK 13 Jim Hall – PR Harold Johnson – positions

In 1990, the Manly-Warringah Sea Eagles club recognised their players, past and present, with a team announced to reflect the best squad up to that point. That team is listed below.

No.

Position
Player

1 Graham Eadie – FB 2 Tom Mooney – WG 3 Michael O'Connor – CE 4 Bob Fulton – CE 5 Les Hanigan – WG 6 Wally O'Connell – FE 7 Des Hasler – HB 8 John O'Neill – PR 9 Max Krilich – HK

No.

Position
Player

10 Roy Bull – PR 11 Phil Lowe – SR 12 Terry Randall – SR 13 Malcolm "Mal" Reilly – LK 14 Ian Martin – positions 15 Alan Thompson – positions 16 Steve Norton – positions 17 John McDonald – positions

In 2006, a Dream Team of former Manly-Warringah Sea Eagles players was selected by a panel of selectors which featured former Manly-Warringah administrator Ken Arthurson, respected rugby league writer Ian Heads, the club chairman Kerry Sibraa and journalist Phil Rothfield.

No.

Position
Player

1 Graham Eadie – FB 2 Ken Irvine – WG 3 Ray Branighan – CE 4 Bob Fulton – CE 5 Michael O'Connor – WG 6 Wally O'Connell – FE 7 Geoff Toovey – HB 8 Roy Bull – PR 9 Max Krilich – HK

No.

Position
Player

10 John O'Neill – PR 11 Steve Menzies – SR 12 Terry Randall – SR 13 Malcolm "Mal" Reilly – LK 14 Des Hasler – positions 15 Ben Kennedy – positions 16 Cliff Lyons – positions 17 Paul Vautin – positions Frank Stanton – positions (coach)

== Rivalries ==
=== Melbourne Storm ===
This was regarded as one of the biggest rivalries in the modern era, with the two clubs meeting in the 2007 and 2008 Grand Finals.

The 2008 Grand Final saw the Manly Warringah Sea Eagles defeat their biggest rivals, the Melbourne Storm 40-0 at ANZ Stadium in front of a crowd of 80,388. In the game, Manly ran in eight tries to record the highest rugby league Grand Final margin in Australian history. It was Manly's seventh premiership title.

After Manly went on to win the 2011 premiership, both teams faced off in the 2012 preliminary final in Melbourne. Melbourne defeated Manly 40–12, ending Manly's chances of winning back-to-back titles. Melbourne would then go on to win their second legitimate premiership, following the stripping of their 2007 and 2009 titles after the NRL discovered systematic salary cap breaches by the club .

After nine years without playing each other in the finals, Manly and Melbourne met in week one of the 2021 NRL finals series, where Melbourne won the match 40–12 at Sunshine Coast Stadium.

=== North Sydney Bears ===
Prior to the ill-fated Northern Eagles joint venture from 2000 to 2002, the rivalry between the Manly-Warringah Sea Eagles and foundation club the North Sydney Bears was arguably one of rugby league's fiercest. Manly were admitted into the premiership in 1947 with North Sydney at the time being one of the main advocators for a team to be in Manly. In Manly's first season, most of the side was made up of former Norths players including captain Max Whitehead who played for North Sydney in their 1943 Grand Final defeat by Newtown.

The intense feelings between the two sides continued over the next couple of decades fuelled as players switched between the two clubs. The biggest defection occurred in 1971 when North's life member and one of the game's greatest wingers Ken Irvine joined Manly. Former Manly and North Sydney player Phil Blake said of the rivalry "It was certainly a game you looked forward playing in. The ground was always packed and it was always a great afternoon".

In 2016, North Sydney and Manly played their final competitive senior game against each other in the lower grades NSW Cup competition where the Bears won the match 32–18. The Sea Eagles announced that they would be merging their lower grade sides with the Blacktown Workers teams to become the Blacktown Workers Sea Eagles. However, since 2025, the Sea Eagles returned to the NSW Cup as the Manly Warringah Sea Eagles, ending their partnership with Blacktown Workers.

With the Bears re-entering the competition from 2027 as the Perth Bears, it is hoped they will play each year at either North Sydney Oval, Central Coast Stadium or the Sydney Football Stadium in recognition of the club's Sydney supporter base.

=== Parramatta Eels ===
The Manly Warringah Sea Eagles and the Parramatta Eels, built a fierce rivalry that started in the 1970s. They met in the 1976 NSWRFL Grand Final, in which Manly denied Parramatta a maiden premiership. However, Parramatta won both the 1982 and 1983 Grand Finals against Manly. Since the 1983 Grand Final, Manly and Parramatta have only played against each other in one other finals game, which was in 2005 when Parramatta finished as Minor Premiers and Manly finished in 8th place. Parramatta won the match 46–22.

On 18 May 2003, Parramatta and Manly played in the first-ever golden point match in NRL history. Manly won the match 36–34 at Brookvale Oval, courtesy of a Ben Walker penalty goal. In Round 2 of the 2018 NRL season, Parramatta suffered their worst-ever loss to Manly. The game was played in temperatures of nearly 40 degrees, where Manly ran out 54-0 winners.

In the 2019 NRL season, Parramatta beat Manly in Round 25 to take Manly's fifth spot on the ladder and would go on to beat Brisbane 58–0 in the elimination final. The victory is currently the biggest win in finals history. In Round 11 of the 2022 NRL season, Manly led Parramatta by ten points in the second half before Parramatta scored two tries to make it 20-20. Parramatta's Mitchell Moses then converted a goal from the sideline to win the match 22–20. In Round 21 of the 2022 NRL season, the two sides met at Brookvale Oval, where Manly needed to defeat Parramatta to have any chance of reaching the finals. Parramatta won the game 36–20, with the maligned Jakob Arthur providing two try assists for Parramatta, which ended Manly's finals hopes.

=== Cronulla-Sutherland Sharks ===
This rivalry has been dubbed the "Battle of the beaches", and they met in a brutal Grand Final in 1973 which was described as the dirtiest and toughest Grand Final of them all. Manly also defeated Cronulla 16–0 in the 1978 Grand Final Rematch after the original contest had an 11–11 draw. In 1996, Manly and Cronulla played each other in the 1996 preliminary final where Manly defeated Cronulla 24–0. In the 2013 finals series, the two clubs met at the Sydney Football Stadium with Manly running out 24-18 winners.

In week one of the 2019 finals series, Manly defeated Cronulla to win the game 28–16 at Brookvale Oval and eliminated Cronulla from the finals race.

=== Western Suburbs ===
Manly-Warringah had a fierce rivalry with foundation club Western Suburbs which started in the 1970s and continued through to the early 1980s. The rivalry was dubbed as the "Fibros vs Silvertails". Former Wests coach and now respected league writer Roy Masters was the brain behind the now famous catch-cry. The rivalry was also fierce due to the two club's competing for the premiership with Western Suburbs winning the Minor Premiership in 1978 but it was Manly who claimed the 1978 premiership defeating Wests in the semi-finals.

== Head-to-head records ==
Opponent	Played	Won	Drawn	Lost	Win %
Dolphins	4	3	0	1	75.00
Sharks	110	75	3	32	68.18
Warriors	44	29	1	14	65.91
Cowboys	39	24	0	15	61.54
Roosters	154	94	2	58	61.04
Raiders	68	41	1	26	60.29
Eels	164	97	4	63	59.15
Tigers	39	23	0	16	58.97
Knights	63	36	1	26	57.14
Panthers	104	59	1	44	56.73
Titans	29	16	0	13	55.17
Bulldogs	152	82	5	65	53.95
Rabbitohs	167	83	1	83	49.70
Broncos	52	25	1	26	48.08
Storm	47	19	1	27	40.43
Dragons	39	15	0	24	38.46

== Coaches ==
- Harold Johnson – 1947
- Ray Stehr – 1947–1948
- George Mullins – 1949
- Wally O'Connell – 1950–1952 and 1966–1967
- Roy Bull – 1953
- Ray Norman – 1954
- Pat Devery – 1955–1956
- Ken Arthurson – 1957–1961
- Ron Willey – 1962 and 1970–1974
- Tony Paskins – 1963
- Russell Pepperell – 1964–1965
- George Hunter – 1968–1969
- Frank Stanton – 1975–1979
- Allan Thomson – 1980
- Ray Ritchie – 1981–1982
- Bob Fulton – 1983–1988 and 1993–1999
- Alan Thompson – 1989
- Graham Lowe – 1990–1992
- Peter Sharp – 1999 and 2003¹
- Des Hasler – 2004–2011 and 2019–2022
- Geoff Toovey – 2012–2015
- Trent Barrett – 2016–2018
- Anthony Seibold – 2023–2026
- Kieran Foran – 2026–present
¹ Sharp was also coach of the Northern Eagles between 2000 and 2002

== Records and statistics ==
- Biggest win: 66–0 vs Canterbury (2021 NRL season)
- Biggest loss: 6–68 vs Cronulla (2005 NRL season)
- Biggest Grand Final win: 40-0 vs Melbourne Storm (2008 NRL Grand Final)
- Most consecutive wins: 15 (1995 ARL season)
- Most consecutive losses: 8 (1950 & 1998–99)
- Wooden Spoons: 0

Daly Cherry-Evans holds the club record for most first-grade games (352). The club record for most career points is held by Graham Eadie (1,917). Reuben Garrick holds the highest season total with 304 points in 2021. Brett Stewart is the top try scorer with 163 tries, surpassing the previous record held by Steve Menzies. Menzies scored 151 tries playing for Manly-Warringah and a further 29 during the Northern Eagles venture. Menzies is regarded as the highest try-scoring forward in the history of the game, although there is some contention about the exact number of tries scored, as he started some games playing in the centres. There is also debate over Manly's career try-scoring record with respect to Menzies and his time with the Northern Eagles.

== Honours ==
- New South Wales Rugby League, Australian Rugby League and National Rugby League: 8

1972, 1973, 1976, 1978, 1987, 1996, 2008, 2011

- New South Wales Rugby League, Australian Rugby League and National Rugby League runners-up: 11

1951, 1957, 1959, 1968, 1970, 1982, 1983, 1995, 1997, 2007, 2013

- New South Wales Rugby League, Australian Rugby League and National Rugby League minor premierships: 9

1971, 1972, 1973, 1976, 1983, 1987, 1995, 1996, 1997

- New South Wales Rugby League Club Championships: 4

1972, 1983, 1987, 1988

- World Club Challenge: 1

2009

- KB Cup: 2

1982, 1983

=== Pre-season and youth honours ===
- World Sevens: 3

1990, 1994, 1995

- Pre-Season Cup/Challenge titles: 2

1980, 2023

- First Division, Premier League: 5

1954, 1960, 1969, 1973, 1988

- Jersey Flegg Cup: 4

1961, 1974, 1987, 1988

- Presidents Cup: 2

1946, 1970

- Third Grade: 1

1952

- Holden Cup (Under 20s): 1

2017

== Supporters ==
The Sea Eagles, nicknamed the Silvertails, are well known as a team that most working-class rugby league fans traditionally love to hate.

Notable supporters of the club include:

- Tony Abbott, 28th Prime Minister of Australia
- Jim Anderson, Australian politician
- Allen Aylett, Australian rules football player and administrator
- Mike Baird, 44th Premier of New South Wales
- Layne Beachley, World Surfing Champion
- Gladys Berejiklian, 45th Premier of New South Wales
- Billy Birmingham, comedian
- Sean Fagan, Muay Thai fighter
- Melinda Gainsford-Taylor, World Champion and Olympic athlete.
- Doug Parkinson, Australian musician.
- Grant Goldman, radio personality
- Mike Goldman, radio and television personality
- Wendy Harmer, author, children's writer, playwright and dramatist, radio show host, comedian and television personality
- Brooke Hanson, Olympic and World Champion swimmer
- Jean Hay, Australian politician
- Hugh Jackman, actor
- Thomas Keneally, author
- Barton Lynch, surfer
- Doug Mulray, comedian and radio and television personality
- Sarah Murdoch, model
- Peter Phelps, actor
- Matt Shirvington, television presenter
- Mark Skaife, racing driver, multiple Bathurst 1000 winner
- Michael Slater, cricketer
- Tracey Spicer, television personality
- Miles Stewart, triathlete
- Gary Sweet, actor
- Keith Urban, musician and singer
- John Day, New Zealand sports reporter

== Manly Seabirds ==
The Manly Seabirds is the oldest cheerleading squad in the NRL. The Seabirds head scout is Carlos 'The Jackal' Faico and are sponsored by Salon Warehouse Australia.

== Sources ==
- Rugby League History; Sean Fagan
- Encyclopedia of Rugby League Players, 1999; Alan Whiticker and Glen Hudson
- ABC of Rugby League, 1995; Malcolm Andrews
- Heritage Report on Brookvale Oval, Mayne-Wilson & Associates; August 2005
