= Harold Johnson (rugby league) =

Australian rugby league player

Personal information
- Full name: Harold Francis Johnson
- Born: 18 July 1906; St Leonards, NSW, Australia
- Died: 9 March 1988 (aged 81)

Playing information
- Position: Five-eighth / Halfback
Club
Years	Team	Pld	T	G	FG	P
1924–29	North Sydney	12	2	0	0	6
1931	South Sydney	4	0	1	0	2
	Total	16	2	1	0	8

Coaching information
Club
Years	Team	Gms	W	D	L	W%
1947	Manly Warringah	5	0	0	5	0

Harold Francis Johnson (18 July 1906 – 9 March 1988) was an Australian rugby league player and coach.

Born in Sydney, Johnson was a five-eighth and halfback for North Sydney during the 1920s and also made four first-grade appearances for South Sydney in 1931, which was a premiership year. His brothers Cecil and Jimmy were North Sydney teammates. After his time in the NSWRFL, Johnson had a stint as both a player and coach with Central Newcastle, then relocated to Queensland and was player-coach of Cunnamulla.

Johnson served as the inaugural league coach of Manly Warringah in the 1947 NSWRFL season. The committee dismissed him after the club lost their first five matches, with former Eastern Suburbs coach Ray Stehr taking over. He only found out that he had been sacked when he read it in a newspaper.
