= Tyla Hepi =

New Zealand rugby league footballer

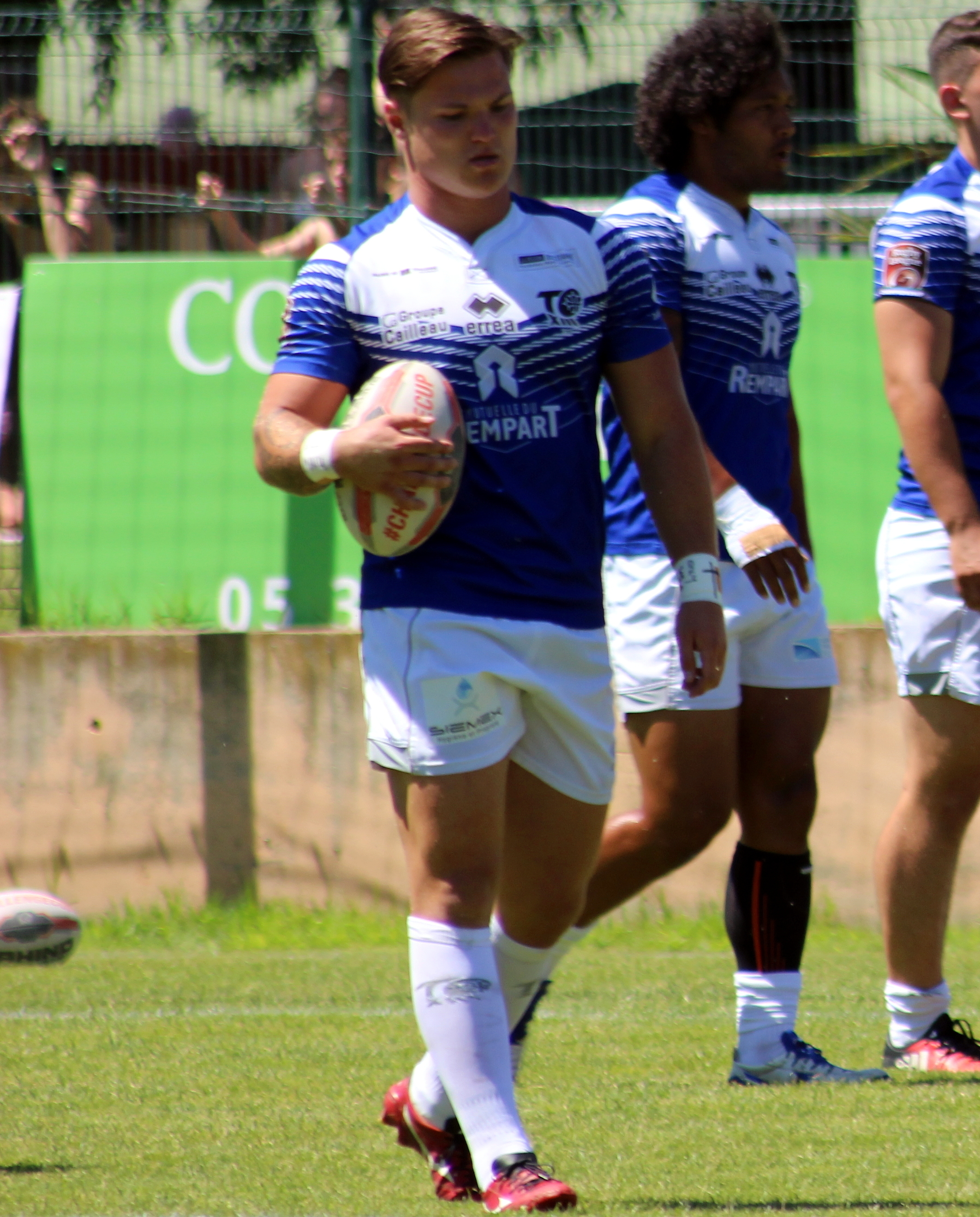

Personal information
- Born: 15 June 1993 (age 33) Auckland, New Zealand
- Height: 6 ft 0 in (1.83 m)
- Weight: 15 st 13 lb (101 kg)

Playing information
- Position: Prop, Second-row
Club
Years	Team	Pld	T	G	FG	P
2013	Hull Kingston Rovers	4	0	0	0	0
2013(loan)	→ Gloucestershire All Golds	18	7	0	0	28
2015	Whitehaven	26	4	0	0	16
2016–19	Toulouse Olympique	109	12	0	0	48
2020–22	Castleford Tigers	22	0	0	0	0
2022–23	Featherstone Rovers	7	0	0	0	0
2024–	Doncaster RLFC	22	0	0	0	0
	Total	208	23	0	0	92
- Source: As of 7 August 2025
- Education: Mount Albert Grammar School
- Father: Brad Hepi

Tyla Hepi (born 15 June 1993) is a New Zealand professional rugby league footballer who plays as a prop for the Doncaster RLFC in the Championship.

== Playing career ==
He previously played for Hull Kingston Rovers and Castleford Tigers in the Super League, and on loan from Hull KR at the Gloucestershire All Golds in League 1. Hepi has also played for Whitehaven and Toulouse Olympique in the Championship, and the Wyong Roos in the NSW Cup. and in the Auckland Rugby League competition for the Point Chevalier Pirates.

=== Doncaster RLFC ===
On 24 Nov 2023 it was reported that he had signed for Doncaster RLFC in the RFL Championship

== Personal ==
Tyla is the son of coach and former player Brad Hepi.
