= Brendan O'Meara (rugby league) =

Australian rugby league footballer

Personal information
- Full name: Brendan O'Meara
- Born: 26 May 1972 (age 54) Wollongong, New South Wales, Australia

Playing information
- Position: Fullback, Wing
Club
Years	Team	Pld	T	G	FG	P
1991–96	Illawarra Steelers	59	16	0	0	64
1997–98	South Sydney	30	2	0	0	8
2000	Dewsbury Rams	10	1	0	0	4
2001–02	Rochdale Hornets	13	2	0	0	8
2003	Featherstone Rovers	2	1	0	0	4
	Total	114	22	0	0	88
- Source: As of 7 June 2019

Brendan O'Meara is an Australian former professional rugby league footballer who played in the 1990s and 2000s. He played for the Illawarra Steelers and the South Sydney Rabbitohs in the New South Wales Rugby League (NSWRL) competition and the ARL and NRL competitions. O'Meara also played for the Dewsbury Rams, Rochdale Hornets and Featherstone Rovers in England.

== Playing career ==
O'Meara made his first grade debut for Illawarra against South Sydney in Round 2 1991 at the Sydney Football Stadium. The following year, O'Meara played 10 games but missed out on the club's historic finals appearance as they made it to within one game of the grand final itself.

O'Meara would go on to be a regular member of the Illawarra team until the end of 1996 but the club struggled on the field and didn't make the finals from 1992 onwards.

In 1997, O'Meara joined South Sydney. O'Meara spent 2 seasons at the club which were largely unsuccessful which the team finishing second last in 1997 and third last in 1998.

In 1999, O'Meara signed with English side Dewsbury. O'Meara then went on to have spells with Rochdale and Featherstone before retiring at the end of 2003.

== Post-playing ==
After retiring from playing, O'Meara became a personal trainer.
