= Brad Hepi =

New Zealand rugby league coach and former professional rugby league footballer

Personal information
- Full name: Brad Hepi
- Born: 11 February 1968 (age 58) New Zealand

Playing information
- Position: Hooker
Club
Years	Team	Pld	T	G	FG	P
1990–92	Carlisle	74	23	0	0	92
1993–95	Workington Town	86	29	0	0	116
1996	Illawarra Steelers	18	3	0	0	12
1997	Workington Town	14	3	0	0	12
1998	Hull FC	29	8	0	0	32
1999–00	Castleford Tigers	25	3	0	0	12
1999(loan)	→Rochdale Hornets	7	4	0	0	16
2000(loan)	→Featherstone Rovers	7	2	0	0	8
2000	Salford City Reds	8	0	0	0	0
2001	Doncaster Dragons	24	4	0	0	16
2001–02	Castleford Tigers	5	0	0	0	0
2002(loan)	→Dewsbury Rams	8	2	0	0	8
2003	Doncaster Dragons	8	5	0	0	20
2007	Sheffield Eagles	4	2	0	0	8
2013	Gloucestershire All Golds	3	0	0	0	0
	Total	320	88	0	0	352
Representative
Years	Team	Pld	T	G	FG	P
1986–88	NZ Māori

Coaching information
Club
Years	Team	Gms	W	D	L	W%
2013–14	Gloucestershire All Golds
- As of 20 May 2024
- Relatives: Tyla Hepi (son)

Brad Hepi (born 11 February 1968) is a New Zealand rugby league player who played professionally in both England and Australia.

== Early years ==
Hepi attended Kelston Boys' High School and captained their first XV rugby union team.

== Playing career ==
Hepi played in the 1986 and 1988 Pacific Cups for the New Zealand Māori.

In 1989 he moved to England, joining Carlisle RLFC. He then had a very successful spell with Workington Town which saw the club promoted from the third division to the first in two seasons, winning the Divisional Premiership against London Broncos along the way. Town initially struggled in the top flight and found themselves at the bottom of the league at Christmas 1994. But an early-January 36-10 win over Halifax, with Hepi man of the match, was the turning point. From there, they rose from 16th to 9th – a position which saw them qualify for the first Super League season in 1996.

At the end of the 1994-95 campaign, Hepi moved to Australia, signing with the Illawarra Steelers for their 1996 season. He returned to Derwent Park in 1997, but couldn't prevent Town's relegation to the professional game's bottom tier. Nevertheless, for what he did in his first spell at the club, Hepi is fondly remembered in Workington.

In 1998 he played for Hull FC in Super League III. Hepi then had spells with the Castleford Tigers (1999 and 2001), Featherstone Rovers (2000), Salford City Reds (2000) and Doncaster (2001) before retiring. Although retired a few years Hepi has made a few cameo appearances for the Gloucestershire All Golds in the 2013 season.

Sporting positions
Preceded by	Coach Gloucestershire All Golds; 2013-2014	Succeeded by Steve McCormack; 2014

== Later years ==
Hepi was appointed coach of the Gloucestershire All-Golds for the 2013 season. He coached the side in their first season of the Kingstone Press Championship 1 league where they reached bottom place. In the 2014 kingstonpress championship one season he saw the side into the first seven-game before stepping down from the position, stating he had taken the side as far as he could.

His son, Tyla Hepi, has played in the Auckland Rugby League competition for the Point Chevalier Pirates. He also played under his father at the Gloucestershire All-Golds whilst on loan from Hull Kingston Rovers.
