= David Riolo =

Australian rugby league footballer

Personal information
- Full name: David Matthew Riolo
- Born: 20 April 1972 (age 54) Wollongong, New South Wales, Australia

Playing information
- Height: 178 cm (5 ft 10 in)
- Weight: 84 kg (13 st 3 lb)
- Position: Fullback
Club
Years	Team	Pld	T	G	FG	P
1990–96	Illawarra Steelers	90	18	0	1	73
1997–98	Parramatta Eels	13	1	0	0	4
	Total	103	19	0	1	77
Representative
Years	Team	Pld	T	G	FG	P
1999	Italy	1	0	0	0	0

Coaching information
Representative
Years	Team	Gms	W	D	L	W%
2003–06	Italy	3	3	0	0	100
- Source: Rugby League Project

David Riolo (born 20 April 1972) is a former Italy international rugby league footballer who played in the 1990s for Illawarra and Parramatta.

== Background ==
Riolo was born in Wollongong, New South Wales, Australia.

== Overview ==
Riolo played fullback over the course of his nine-year career in the Australian Rugby League competition. He also represented Italy in 1999 Mediterranean Cup and in the Rugby League Emerging Nations Tournament in 2000.

Following his retirement from rugby league, David Riolo worked as a sports reporter for WIN Television, before turning his attention to sports management as an accredited Australian Football League, National Rugby League and Australian Rugby Union agent.

Riolo is responsible for the careers of a significant number of Australia’s sporting stars.

== Playing career ==
Riolo played the majority of his career with the Illawarra Steelers, his hometown club, before retiring with the Parramatta Eels in 1998. Riolo's final first grade game as a player was the 1997 major qualifying final against North Sydney which Norths won 24-14.

At the end of the 1999 season, Riolo represented Italy in the first Mediterranean Cup. Riolo later captain/coached The Azzuri in the Rugby League Emerging Nations Tournament in which they were runners-up to British Amateur Rugby League Association, narrowly missing out on a place at the 2000 Rugby League World Cup.

Sporting positions
Preceded by Craig Salvatori; 1999	Coach Italy; 2003-2006	Succeeded by David Penna; 2009

In 2015, Riolo played for the Australian Oztag over-40's side in the World Cup.

== Sports agent ==
Early in his player management career, Riolo cut his teeth working with prominent internationals Jason Cayless, Craig Fitzgibbon, Andrew Ryan and Michael Vella. Today, he manages a number of the NRL’s highest profile players, including Todd Carney, Paul Gallen, James Graham, Brett Morris and Josh Morris. His AFL clients include Kieren Jack.

Most notably, Riolo has shaped the career of multi-sport athlete Karmichael Hunt, successfully negotiating cross-code moves from the Brisbane Broncos (NRL) to Biarritz Olympique in France (Top 14 Rugby Union), and then to the Gold Coast Suns (AFL) back in Australia.

On 26 April 2012, Riolo was banned for 6 months by the NRL over his actions in the Melbourne Storm salary cap affair.
