= Ciriaco Mescia =

Australian rugby league footballer

Personal information
- Full name: Ciriaco Mescia
- Born: 14 January 1973 (age 53) Australia

Playing information
- Height: 173 cm (5 ft 8 in)
- Weight: 81 kg (12 st 11 lb)
- Position: Hooker
Club
Years	Team	Pld	T	G	FG	P
1994–99	Western Suburbs	90	9	0	0	36
2000–01	Wests Tigers	38	8	0	0	32
	Total	128	17	0	0	68
Representative
Years	Team	Pld	T	G	FG	P
1995–97	NSW Country	3	0	0	0	0

Ciriaco Mescia, nicknamed "Cherry," is an Australian former professional rugby league footballer who played in the 1990s and 2000s for the Western Suburbs Magpies and Wests Tigers. He played primarily at hooker.

== Playing career ==
Mescia played junior football with Batlow. He gained attention playing for Riverina against Newcastle in 1990 before joining the Magpies in 1991. He made his first grade debut for the club in round 7 of 1994, but it was his sole appearance for that year.

Making his second appearance in round 4 of 1995, Mescia played lock behind hooker Jim Serdaris. In round 5, Mescia was moved to hooker and Serdaris to the second row, and Mescia scored his first career try in a 44-16 win over the Sydney City Roosters. Mescia remained at hooker for most of the rest of the season, barring a two-game stint at halfback near the end of the year.

The Magpies made the semi-finals in 1996, with Mescia playing in the first 18 rounds before being injured. Roy Masters considered him a possible future Kangaroo. In 1997, after "being troubled by headaches for most of the season", he was dropped to reserves mid-year, but still played in 17 games.

Mescia played a career-high 23 games in 1999, but the Magpies conceded the most points in NRL history and won just 3 games. He was ranked second for most tackles for the regular season. Mescia played in the club's final ever game as a first grade side which was a 60-16 loss against Auckland at Campbelltown Stadium.

When Western Suburbs merged with the Balmain Tigers, Mescia became a member of the Wests Tigers squad from the 2000 season, but was often chosen on the bench behind starting hooker Darren Senter. With a new coach in Terry Lamb in 2001, Mescia won back the position of hooker, but it was to be his last season as a player, retiring due to a fracture to his lower back in the 2002 pre-season.

In 2009, Mescia was made a life member of the Western Suburbs club.

== Representative ==
Mescia played for Country Origin for three straight seasons from 1995.

== Coaching ==
Mescia became High Performance Manager for his former club the Wests Tigers from 2003 to 2009. In 2010, he joined the high-performance unit at the Sydney Roosters. He later became the strength and conditioning coach at the Parramatta Eels. In 2015, he filled the same position at the St. George-Illawarra Dragons. Mescia has also been Head Trainer for the National Italian Rugby League Team during various tournaments and fixtures

== Sources ==
- Alan Whiticker; Glen Hudson (2007). The Encyclopedia of Rugby League Players. Wetherill Park, New South Wales: Gary Allen Pty Ltd. ISBN 978-1-877082-93-1.
