= Stewart House (Australia) =

Charitable foundation in New South Wales, Australia

Stewart House is a charitable foundation and centre for children, based in Curl Curl, New South Wales.

The organisation was founded in 1931 as a "preventorium" which provided respite for public school children during the Great Depression. Sick or malnourished children visited the centre because of the healthy atmosphere near the sea, good food, and available exercise.

During their stay, children are provided with optometric, dental and medical treatment as well as emotional support.

Since its foundation, Stewart House has catered for over 200,000 children who typically spend a fortnight at the house. It is currently funded by donations from public school teachers.
