= History of the Brisbane Broncos =

The history of the Brisbane Broncos Rugby League Football Club stretches back from their inception in the mid-1980s to the present day. They were introduced to the NSWRL's Winfield Cup premiership in 1988, taking the competition by storm in winning their first six games. The Broncos participated in 18 consecutive finals series from 1992–2009, winning premierships seven times, including the 1992 and 1993 NSWRL premierships, the Superleague premiership in 1997 and then the 1998, 2000, 2006 and 2025 NRL premiership, having ended their longest Premiership drought of 19 years.

== 1980s ==
Whilst Brisbane had had its own rugby league club competition since 1909, Brisbane teams had been assembled occasionally, usually referred to as Combined Brisbane for Bulimba Cup tournaments and representative matches against Sydney-based sides and touring international teams. By the 1980s, the New South Wales Rugby Football League premiership decided they wanted to expand outside their traditional Sydney base. This began in 1982 with the introduction of the Canberra Raiders and the Illawarra Steelers.

Brisbane made its first official bid for an NSWRL license in 1986, however the NSWRL was in favour of awarding a license to Newcastle, which it did in October 1986. The NSWRL was primarily concerned with the enormous cost of airfares to and from Brisbane that its clubs would have to bear (the league's furthest travel distance at the time was Canberra, a roadtrip of under 300 kilometres and the Newcastle bid had the benefit of significantly less travel).

A proposal was made to the Queensland Rugby League to enter a Brisbane team in 1987, but it was voted down.

The threat posed by the VFL's (now AFL) expansion team the Brisbane Bears which was granted a license in 1986 for entry in the 1987 season however stirred both the QRL and NSWRL into action. Soon after the granting of the license, QRL officials mobilised, seeking a NSWRL franchise and rich backers. The aim of QRL general manager Ross Livermore was specifically to stifle the VFL's publicity and promotions in the state. The NSWRL, responding to the VFL's national expansion by ramping up its own national expansion plans, included the admission of a Brisbane team among three new teams from outside Sydney: the Newcastle Knights and Gold Coast-Tweed Giants. A clause was introduced into Brisbane's licence, only one team (the Broncos) could play in South-East Queensland, forcing the new Gold Coast club to set up base in Tweed Heads, New South Wales, effectively making the Broncos the first and only Queensland based club in the competition.

The QRL's bid was bolstered by Queensland's success in the 1980s, the early years of the State of Origin series between Queensland and New South Wales, in addition to the inclusion of a combined Brisbane Rugby League team in the mid-week competition, convinced the New South Wales Rugby League (NSWRL) to invite a Queensland-based team into the competition. After tough competition between the various syndicates for the Brisbane licence, the QRL chose the bid of former Brisbane Rugby League (BRL) players, Barry Maranta and Paul "Porky" Morgan. At the first meeting with the NSWRL hierarchy, the newly formed Brisbane Broncos were asked to pay a $500,000 fee.

After deliberating over such names as Bulls, Brumbies, Bombers and Kookaburras, the club eventually decided on the name Broncos. Former Australian representative Brisbane Rugby League player John Ribot was appointed the club's first chief executive officer.

As the people of Brisbane got more and more behind the club, interest in the NSWRL competition increased and the Bronco took up some of the best players from the Brisbane Rugby League competition, and the BRL soon entered a phase of decline. The Broncos' first year of 1988 was the first time no player from the BRL was chosen to represent Queensland in the State of Origin.

FIRST EVER TEAM (those in bold had previously represented both Australia and Queensland)
Player	Position
**Colin Scott**	Fullback
Joe Kilroy	Wing
Chris Johns	Centre
**Gene Miles**	Centre
Michael Hancock	Wing
**Wally Lewis** (C)	Five-eighth
Allan Langer	Halfback
Terry Matterson	Lock
Brett Le Man	Second Row
Keith Gee	Second Row
**Greg Dowling**	Prop
**Greg Conescu**	Hooker
**Bryan Niebling**	Prop
Mark Hohn	Interchange
Billy Noke	Interchange
Craig Grauf	Interchange
**Wayne Bennett**	COACH

The Brisbane Broncos debuted in the New South Wales Rugby League premiership in the 1988 Winfield Cup competition. The team boasted then current Australian Kangaroos captain and Queensland State of Origin legend Wally Lewis, who was the first player to sign on with the new club, and was the inaugural Broncos captain. All but four players from this team played State of Origin during their careers, a feat which can be attributed to the development skills of the incumbent Maroons coach Wayne Bennett was the inaugural coach for the Broncos, and remained for the following twenty-one years. In 1988 Bennett was the reigning Dally M Coach of the Year having jointly won the award with his Canberra Raiders co-coach Don Furner in 1987.

On 6 March 1988, at Lang Park in Brisbane, the brand-new Broncos defeated the 1987 Winfield Cup Premiers Manly-Warringah 44–10 in their first premiership game. Although the Broncos won the first six games in their inaugural season, a mid-season slump cost the club a debut finals appearance, finishing the season in seventh position.

The Broncos' second season saw them claim their first piece of silverware by winning the mid-week knockout Panasonic Cup competition after defeating the Illawarra Steelers 22–20 in a hard-fought final at Sydney's Parramatta Stadium. In the 1989 season the club improved on the previous year, finishing the season in sixth position, only just missing out on a finals berth after losing a play-off for fifth place 38–14 against the Cronulla-Sutherland Sharks at Parramatta Stadium.

== 1990s ==
In 1990, in order to increase the Broncos' success in the Winfield Cup, Wayne Bennett controversially sacked Wally Lewis as club captain and gave the role to centre Gene Miles. Miles had retired from representative football, and Bennett hoped he could remove the team's reliance on Lewis, who was said not to be a strong club man or a good trainer for the Broncos.

The Balmain Tigers were the last team the Broncos had failed to beat, until their victory in Round 18 of the 1990 season. Brisbane finished the regular season in second position, qualifying for their first finals campaign. In the Preliminary Final against the Canberra Raiders, the Broncos were knocked out 30–2, so finished the regular season in third place. Canberra then went on to win the competition. At the end of the season, Wally Lewis parted company with the Broncos, moving to the Gold Coast Seagulls.

In their fourth season, the Broncos won the pre-season 1991 Panasonic Cup competition. In round 16 of NSWRL season 1991, they were kept scoreless for the first time ever by the Manly-Warringah Sea Eagles. Steve Renouf became the first Bronco to score four tries in a match in round 20. The club finished the season in seventh place, missing the finals, despite winning their last five games consecutively.

After the retirement of Gene Miles, the captaincy role fell onto half-back Allan Langer for the 1992 season. The Broncos were at the top of the ladder for most of 1992's competition, losing just four matches to gain their first minor premiership with a six-point buffer over second-placed St George Dragons. Newly appointed captain Langer also won the Rothmans Medal. In their first Grand Final appearance, the Broncos were favourites and comprehensively defeated the St. George Dragons 28–8 at the Sydney Football Stadium and finally the Winfield Cup was transported to Queensland for the first time. A month later, the Broncos played in the 1992 World Club Challenge match against dominant British champions Wigan. No Australian club had yet gone to England and won, and many expected the Broncos to follow that trend. They did not, smashing the cherry pickers in emphatic fashion 22–8.

After years of dispute with the Lang Park Trust over brewery advertising, Fourex had pouring rights for Lang Park while Powers Brewing was major sponsor of the Broncos. For the 1993 season the Broncos moved to the Council-owned ANZ Stadium, in suburban Nathan. Signs of a hangover existed with the club losing two of its first three matches, including their debut at the new home ground against the struggling Parramatta Eels. But the Broncos bounced back, beating the Balmain Tigers 50 nil, (the highest winning margin for the club at the time) to establish themselves solidly in the upper echelons of the competition. A last round lapse against St George relegated the Broncos to fifth spot, meaning they had to win four straight elimination games to defend their title. They went on to demolish the Manly Sea Eagles' defence in a 36–10 romp. Canberra dropped dead with the loss of Ricky Stuart and the Broncos ran roughshod over them with a 30–12 win. Against the Canterbury Bulldogs in the preliminary final, Brisbane were trailing 16–10 at half time, but Allan Langer scored immediately in the second half to level, then potted a field goal to break the dead lock late in the game. In the grand final, again against the Dragons, the Broncos were victorious once more, this time 14–6. This win was significant because it was the only time a team which had finished 5th in the minor premiership had gone on to win the competition. It was Glenn Lazarus' fifth consecutive grand final appearance, having already played in the previous year's for Brisbane and the three years' before that for Canberra.

The move from the 33,000 capacity Lang Park to the 60,000 seat ANZ Stadium also proved to be good for attendance figures. The Broncos average home attendance jumped from 21,687 in 1992 to 43,200 in 1993, a total increase of 99.19% (as of 2015 this remains not only Brisbane's highest average attendance in a season, but the highest for any club in the history of rugby league in Australia dating back to 1908). Their highest home attendance for the year was 58,593 for the late season game against St George while their smallest home attendance was 28,126 against Illawarra in Round 8 (that season low attendance against the Steelers was actually larger than any other teams highest home attendance in 1993).

In the English spring of 1994 it was announced that the Brisbane Broncos club was buying the London Crusaders, who were renamed 'London Broncos'. The 1994 season started in fine fashion for Brisbane. They cruised through to the final of the Tooheys Challenge Cup for the fifth time, but amazingly were pipped by the South Sydney Rabbitohs in the decider. That started a shocking opening to the 1994 competition that saw them win just one game in the first month of the competition and leave them languishing near oblivion. They were flat out winning two games in a row for much of the season. Behind the scenes, Broncos chief executive John Ribot sent his first report on the Super League concept to News Ltd chief executive Ken Cowley.

On-field Brisbane continued to struggle, with frustration reaching boiling point against fellow 1988 expansion club, the Newcastle Knights. Referee Greg McCallum sinbinned Allan Langer for dissent as the Knights beat the Broncos for the first time. More disappointment came mid-season when dominant British champions Wigan avenged their 1992 loss by winning the 1994 World Club Challenge at ANZ Stadium. A late season revival catapulted the Broncos into fifth spot, narrowly beating out the Illawarra Steelers for a spot in the finals. A 16–4 victory over Manly revived some hope of a 'three-peat'. The following week they played against the North Sydney Bears, and after trailing 14–4 the Broncos staged a comeback to level at 14–14. In the end, a Jason Taylor field goal won the game for North Sydney 15–14 shortly before full-time.

Before the start of the 1995 season, which was to be controlled by the Australian Rugby League, the Brisbane Broncos started Federal Court action against New South Wales Rugby League over salary cap rules. The Super League war had arrived.

The team was hoping to avenge their on-field disappointment of 1994. They started perfectly, winning their first seven matches in their best start ever. But a 26–0 humiliation against Canberra sent the Broncos on another tumble that saw them lose four matches in five weeks. Despite being free of State of Origin representative duties due to their affiliation with Super League, the Broncos had again faltered mid-season, but went on to win their last 6 matches of the regular season. In the finals though, the Broncos suffered close defeats at the hands of defending Premiers Canberra and eventual 1995 winners the Canterbury Bulldogs. An injury to Allan Langer resulted in crucial missed tackles in both matches by the Brisbane skipper, and played a contributing factor in the Broncos' failure to win. However a positive for the 1995 season at the Broncos was the introduction of a new talent in teenager Darren Lockyer, who was named the club's rookie of the year.

In 1996, the Broncos once again went through a losing streak mid-season but once more recovered to finish second. Gorden Tallis, at the time still contracted to the ARL-loyal St. George club, chose to sit out this season rather than play for the Dragons as he had also signed to play for the Broncos in 1996. Captain Alfie Langer was judged the best and fairest player in the competition, claiming the Dally M Medal. However the Broncos again capitulated, going down to North Sydney and then Cronulla to lose their fifth straight finals match. At the end of the 1996 season, players Kerrod Walters, Alan Cann, Willie Carne and Michael Hancock were asked to leave the club, as they could no longer be guaranteed regular places in the Broncos' first grade team.

The Brisbane Broncos had been involved in the Super League war since the beginning around 1994. After thinly veiled threats of expulsion from the NSWRL, the club was one of the last of several to sign with the new league and all players followed suit. In 1996 the club's Chief Executive, John Ribot was appointed CEO of Super League (Australia), leading to a common perception that the war was orchestrated by the Brisbane Broncos club.

After much court action aimed at stopping it, the Super League competition started in 1997, and was run parallel to the existing ARL premiership season. The Broncos again won their first 7 matches, before finally losing to the Penrith Panthers in round 8. Brisbane won their final three regular-season games to capture their second minor premiership. In the Major Semi-Final against Cronulla the Broncos thrashed the sharks to move into their first home Grand Final. The Sharks recovered to make the big one, but they were no match for the Broncos. Despite being without key forward Glenn Lazarus and hampered by a troublesome groin injury, Allan Langer led his side to victory 26–8 for their third premiership in front of almost 60,000 home fans. Following the premiership win, the Broncos also won the 1997 World Club Championship which involved clubs from the Super League as well.

In the pre-season of 1998 the National Rugby League (NRL) was formed, after a merger deal was struck between the Australian Rugby League and Super League organisations. As could be expected by their finish to the 1997 season, Brisbane were solid in their first five matches of 1998, snatching five victories. In rounds five and seven, the Broncos won by a margin of 54 points, which was the club's record at the time. This was followed by shock losses to the Sydney City Roosters and Cronulla, but Langer led them to a big win over Canterbury only to see two more club losses. But the Broncos recovered to post huge wins over Penrith and the Western Suburbs Magpies. The Broncos finished the remainder of the regular season undefeated, but far from in their best form. After a week off granted by winning the minor premiership, the Broncos were smothered out of the game by Parramatta in their opening finals match. But they lifted and provided some miracle spark against the Melbourne Storm a week later, resurrecting their premiership hopes. A huge win over Sydney City in the preliminary final installed them at near unbackable odds against Canterbury in the first NRL Grand Final. The Broncos came back from a 12–10 half time deficit to again win consecutive premierships for the second time, and their fourth in seven seasons with a 38–12 Grand Final victory. The League's top try-scorer for the season was Brisbane's Darren Smith.

In 1999, Queensland Cup side, the Toowoomba Clydesdales became a feeder club for the Brisbane Broncos. the '99 season saw the departure of one of Brisbane's favourite sons, Allan "Alfie" Langer, after the Broncos had a shocking start to their NRL campaign. The captaincy was passed onto Kevin Walters part way through the season. The club made an amazing turnaround midseason, winning 11 consecutive games to qualify for the finals in eighth position but were easily disposed of 42–20 by the Cronulla Sharks at Toyota Park in week one of the finals series.

== 2000s ==
Brisbane spent their entire 2000 season from round four in first position on the ladder. However, the record for worst collapse in a match was broken in round 18 when an 18-point lead was surrendered to the Newcastle Knights. Veteran winger Michael Hancock and captain Kevin Walters, playing their final seasons with Brisbane, both took the record for most grand Final appearances for the club when they helped the Broncos to victory in the last daytime Grand Final at Stadium Australia, defeating the Sydney Roosters in a tight match 14–6. It was the club's fifth premiership in nine seasons.

Walters moved from the Broncos to join Allan Langer in England at the end of 2000s NRL season, and the captaincy was passed onto Gorden Tallis. The Broncos players wore black armbands during the 2001 World Club Challenge match in January in memory of the club's co-founder Paul "Porky" Morgan who had died from a heart attack the previous day. The 2001 season was unusual for the Broncos in that they were unable to string together more than three wins at any time during the season. They lost six games from rounds 20 to 25, at the time the club's worst-ever losing streak. However they finished NRL season 2001 in 5th position and made it as far as the preliminary final which they lost to Parramatta.

The Broncos' 2002 season saw the return of club legend Allan Langer to the side, following his successful comeback to Australian rugby league in the previous year's State of Origin decider. It was also the beginning of Brisbane's recurring "post origin slump", which was to haunt the club for the next four years. As many of the Queensland Maroons who compete in the mid-week State of Origin matches are Broncos' players, this extra workload often results in a loss of form for the club around and after the time of the Origin series. The Broncos finished the 2002 regular season in 3rd position, with the highest points differential in the league, but were knocked out in the Preliminary Final against the Sydney City Roosters.

On 6 January 2003 Shane Edwards was replaced as CEO of the club by Bruno Cullen. The Brisbane Broncos had a strong start to their 2003 season, winning 11 of their first 14 games, but later breaking the club's longest losing streak record by losing their last 8 games straight. Brisbane still made it to the finals, finishing the regular season in 8th position, but lost the Qualifying Final to the Penrith Panthers 28–18. The 2003 season was the first in the Broncos' history in which they lost more games than they won. In the first half of the 2003 NRL season, whilst still at ANZ Stadium, the Broncos were only beaten once (by the New Zealand Warriors in round five). However, upon returning to Suncorp Stadium in round 12, the Broncos only won a home match once (defeating the Sydney Roosters in round 16).

Also in 2003 the Rugby World Cup was played in Australia. As a testament to the quality of the athletes produced at the Broncos, three of the club's former players featured in two of the top three finishing teams of the rugby union world's peak competition, all of them having played together in the Broncos' 2000 premiership-winning side: Lote Tuquri with Wendell Sailor for Australia and Brad Thorn for New Zealand.

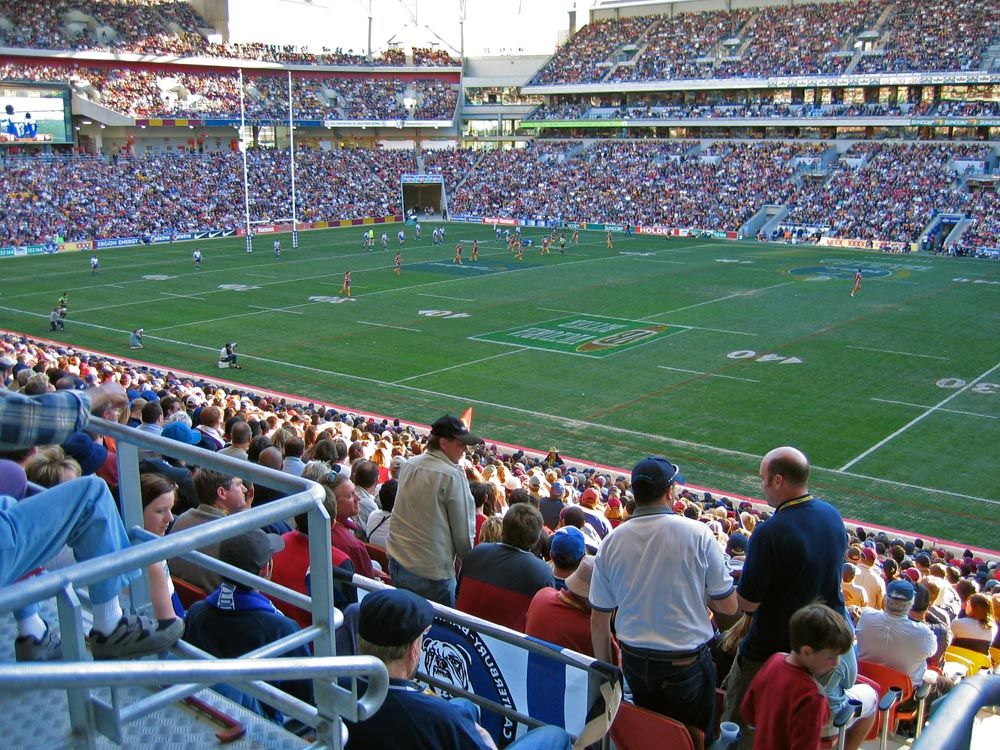
Brisbane vs Bulldogs, Round 23, 2004

The 2004 NRL season was Darren Lockyer's first in the position of Five-eighth. Brisbane started their 2004 campaign by winning their first match since Round 19, 2003 with a 28–20 win over the New Zealand Warriors in Round 1. However, the Broncos lost their next match against bogey team, the Parramatta Eels 26–18. Brisbane won their next five games after that. In round 10 the Broncos and the Newcastle Knights made history by playing out the first ever golden point match on free-to-air television. After 3 minutes and 26 seconds of extra time, Newcastle's Kurt Gidley booted a field goal which got the Knights home 17–16.

The 2004 season's Finals Series saw Brisbane captain Gorden Tallis' final match: the Broncos were knocked out of contention by the North Queensland Cowboys in a 10–0 loss in the Raging Bull's home town of Townsville. It was the first time the Broncos had lost to the Cowboys.

With Gorden Tallis' retirement at the end of the previous season, the Broncos' captaincy was passed onto Darren Lockyer. In round 1 of the 2005 season the Brisbane Broncos got their revenge for the previous season's Semi-Final loss to the North Queensland Cowboys, defeating them 29–16. The Melbourne Storm gave the Broncos their biggest defeat in the club's history with a 50–4 rampage in Round 4 (It was the first time the club had ever conceded 50 points). Then the following week Brisbane scored 54 points when they beat Parramatta 54–14. The next time they faced the Storm, the Broncos won, and they lost the next time they faced the Eels. From Round 5 to Round 15, Brisbane won 10 games straight. Then from Round 22 to the Semi Final the Broncos lost 7 games straight, at the time the second longest losing streak in the club's history.

The Broncos did not start their 2006 season well, with a big 36–4 defeat by the previous year's runners-up, the North Queensland Cowboys in the first round. This was the 8th consecutive loss for the club and equalled the record for longest losing streak set in 2003. Round 2 saw the Broncos get their first win for the season and their first win since round 21, 2005 with a 16–12 victory over the Cronulla Sharks (This game is the third game in a row that the Brisbane Broncos beat Cronulla Sharks 16–12 at Toyota Park). The Broncos then went on to have a strong first half of the season, winning 11 of their first 17 games. Round 8 saw Brisbane produce the biggest comeback in the club's history when they came from 18–0 down at halftime to win 30–28 over the Canberra Raiders. But the year's biggest upset came when the team lost to the last-placed and previously winless South Sydney Rabbitohs 34–14 in Round 14.

After the 2006 State of Origin series finished, Brisbane once again entered their "Post-Origin Slump" losing 5 games straight from Round 18 – Round 23. However strong performances against the competition leaders Melbourne Storm (only losing 18–12) and a resounding victory against the Canterbury Bulldogs 30–0 the following week saw a return to form. The Broncos then defeated the injury-struck Parramatta Eels 23–0 in Round 25 and in round 26 the New Zealand Warriors 36–12.

Brisbane was heading into the finals with momentum not seen since their last premiership-winning season in 2000, but lost to the St George Illawarra Dragons 20–4 in what was at the time the highest attended Broncos game ever played at Suncorp Stadium. Brisbane bounced back in the semi-final, defeating the Newcastle Knights 50–6 and captain Darren Lockyer became the club's highest ever point-scorer with 1,077 (breaking Michael De Vere's record of 1,062 points). After trailing 20–6 at half time against the Bulldogs in the grand final qualifier the Broncos came back in the second half to get a 37–20 victory, earning a place in the 2006 NRL Grand Final.

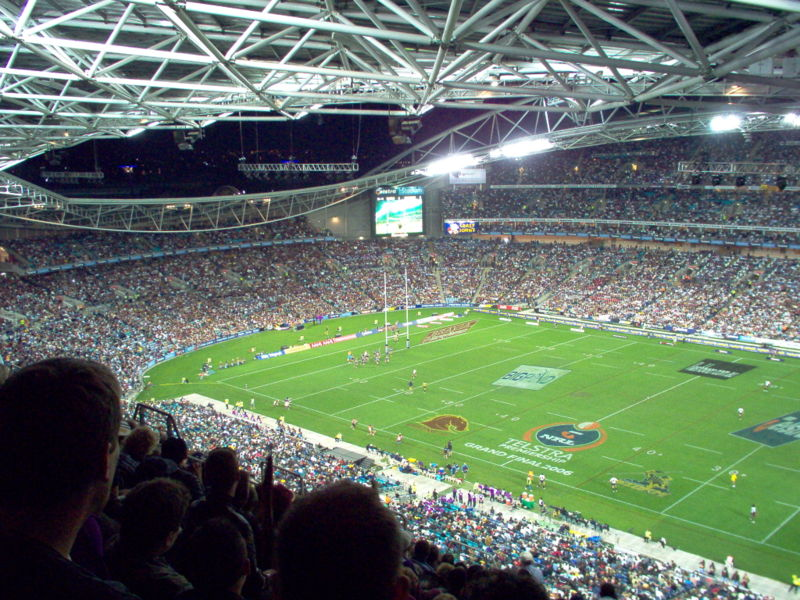
2006 NRL Grand Final

It was the sixth time the Broncos made the Grand Final. Their opponents were the Melbourne Storm and the game was the first ever National Rugby League Grand Final not to feature a New South Wales-based club. Brisbane won the game 15–8. This saw a fitting farewell to the NRL's Number one prop Shane Webcke who retired at the end of the season. The win enabled the Broncos to maintain their perfect record in grand final matches and made Wayne Bennett the most successful coach in grand final history with 6 from 6.

On 6 December 2006, the Toowoomba Clydesdales, who had been the feeder club for the Brisbane Broncos since 1999 announced that the club was roughly A$100,000 short to be able to field a team in the 2007 Queensland Cup and withdrew from the competition. The following day the Aspley Broncos were announced as the new feeder team for the Brisbane Broncos.

On 23 February 2007 The Broncos played against Super League champions St. Helens in the 2007 World Club Challenge. St. Helens took the match 18–14 in the last minutes. This was followed by a poor start to the 2007 NRL season by the Broncos, who lost their captain and Five-eighth Darren Lockyer to an ankle injury after the first match against the North Queensland Cowboys. Lockyer returned to the field in Round 3 against the Penrith Panthers, but Brisbane had lost their first three games in a row for the first time since 1999. They racked up their first win against the Sydney Roosters in the traditional Good Friday match played by the two clubs. Another loss followed by a win in the Andrew Johns farewell against Newcastle in Round 6.

When, in the Round 7 replay of last year's grand-final, Brisbane were unable to defeat Melbourne, they had managed to win just 2 of their first seven games, compared to their strong starts in 2006 and 2005. Having not yet played an NRL game in 2007, Tame Tupou, the Broncos' top try-scorer for the previous season, left the club in round 7 for England. In round 11 Brisbane were at the bottom of the ladder before racking up their biggest ever win, defeating an under-strength Newcastle Knights 71–6. It was also the Knights' biggest ever loss and the most points the Broncos had ever scored in a game. This was followed up with a loss to an understrength St George Illawarra Dragons.

As a result of the team's form, coach Wayne Bennett gave the players time off during the Broncos' bye. This strategy appeared to be successful, with the team winning five successive games. However, in their Round 18 win against the Cowboys, Lockyer tore his anterior cruciate ligament, ruling him out for the rest of the season. Lockyer's injury, combined with injuries to big-name players Karmichael Hunt, Justin Hodges, Brent Tate and Shaun Berrigan, played a role in Brisbane winning just two of their last eight games of the season.

In the final round of the 2007 regular season, the Broncos suffered a 68–22 loss to Parramatta, equalling their worst ever defeat and most points conceded in a match; this was despite the team leading 16–6 at one point in the game with a chance to go further ahead before Nick Emmett bombed a certain try with the line wide open. However, the club still finished eighth after the regular season, thus making the finals for the sixteenth straight year. Brisbane's efforts did not improve the following Sunday when they played their 500th game ever and their last of the season, being defeated soundly by eventual grand final winners the Melbourne Storm 40–0. Only one year after winning the premiership, 2007 saw the second time ever that the Broncos lost more games than they won in a season of football.

On 9 October 2007, the club announced the termination of the contracts of squad members Ian Lacey and John Te Reo, after they were involved in the assault of a man.

The Broncos again underwent their 'boot camp' bush training regime with the Australian Army in the 2008 pre-season. The start to the club's 21st season was a strong one with a convincing 48–12 win over the Penrith Panthers in round 1. It was also a poor return to Suncorp Stadium for Petero Civoniceva who played his first game in Penrith colours as the new Panthers captain. Corey Parker also broke the record for most goals in a match for the Broncos converting 10 goals from 10 attempts. The following week the Broncos made it two from two from the start of the season for first time since 2003, when they beat the Sydney Roosters 20–14 at the Sydney Football Stadium. This made it seven wins from nine Good Friday matches which have been played between the two clubs since 2001. The Broncos, having been in first place on the premiership ladder from round one, were knocked from that position by a round six loss to Gold Coast.

Brisbane made the signing of 2008 when they secured teenage international Israel Folau for four seasons, starting in 2009. This at a time when coach, Wayne Bennett, plus several key players including Tonie Carroll, Darius Boyd, David Stagg, Michael Ennis, Ben Hannant and Kiwi international Greg Eastwood were leaving the club.

In mid 2008, Ivan Henjak, a former professional rugby league footballer and assistant coach of the Broncos since 2006, was named as the Broncos second ever coach, succeeding Bennett in 2009. That year was star fullback Karmichael Hunt's final year as he revealed a shock code-switch to Australian rules football for 2011. The Broncos came within one match of the Grand Final, losing to eventual grand final winners, the Melbourne Storm.

== 2010s ==
In 2010 Broncos captain Darren Lockyer took the record for most games with a single club by making his 329th appearance for Brisbane. The Broncos' amazing record of 18 consecutive finals appearances came to an end in 2010 with a final round defeat to the Canberra Raiders at home, meaning the Broncos missed the finals for the first time since 1991. All of their premierships came in that 18-year period. Their 18 consecutive finals appearances are second only to the St. George Dragons' 24 consecutive years of finals appearances (1950–1974), which netted their 11 consecutive premierships.

In 2011, The Brisbane Broncos had a new coach in to replace sacked Ivan Henjak, The Broncos defense was impregnable with 6/7 wins in their first 7 matches leaving them at the top of the ladder.

According to a 2013 report, the Brisbane Broncos had the highest brand equity of any Australian sporting brand.

In what is considered by some commentators to be one of the best Grand Finals in recent history the 2015 Grand Final against the North Queensland Cowboys went in to Golden Point overtime for the first time. Jonathan Thurston, after missing a match winning try conversion after the 80 minutes, kicked a field goal 2 minutes into the Golden Point period to win the match for the North Queensland Cowboys 17–16. As of 2025, the Broncos lost another Grand Final in heartbreaking circumstances in 2023 followed by a Grand Final victory in 2025, ending their 19 year Premiership drought. The Broncos are the current Premiers.

== Sponsorship history ==
Year	Jersey Manufacturer	Major Sponsor	Sleeve Sponsor	Shorts Sponsor	Bottom Back Sponsor	Top Back Sponsor
1988	Peerless	Powers Brewing				Powers Brewing
1989	Peerless	Powers Brewing				Powers Brewing
1990	Peerless	Powers Brewing	TR Auscel			Powers Brewing
1991	Peerless	Powers Brewing	TR Auscel			Powers Brewing
1992	M Sport	Powers Brewing	TDK	Powers Brewing		Powers Brewing
1993	M Sport	Powers Brewing	TDK	Powers Brewing		Powers Brewing
1994	M Sport	Traveland	TDK	Ansett Australia		Traveland
1995	M Sport	Traveland	MMI	Ansett Australia		Traveland
1996	M Sport	Traveland	Ansett Australia	Ansett Australia		Traveland
1997	Nike	Ansett Australia	Ansett Australia	Ansett Australia		
1998	Nike	Ansett Australia	Ansett Australia	Ansett Australia		
1999	Nike	131 Shop	Ansett Australia	Keno		
2000	Nike	131 Shop	Ansett Australia	Keno		
2000	Nike	Ergon Energy	Ansett Australia	Keno		Ergon Energy
2001	Nike	Ergon Energy	Ansett Australia	Keno		Ergon Energy
2002	Nike	Ergon Energy	Keno			Ergon Energy
2003	Nike	Ergon Energy	Keno			Ergon Energy
2004	Nike	Ergon Energy	Mortgage House	NRMA Insurance		Ergon Energy
2005	Nike	Ergon Energy	Q.L.D. Group	NRMA Insurance		Ergon Energy
2006	Nike	Ergon Energy	Q.L.D. Group	NRMA Insurance	Strathfield	Ergon Energy
2007	Nike	Ergon Energy	WOW Sight & Sound	NRMA Insurance	Toyota	Ergon Energy
2008	Nike	WOW Sight & Sound	WOW Sight & Sound	NRMA Insurance	Toyota	The Coffee Club
2009	Nike	WOW Sight & Sound	WOW Sight & Sound	NRMA Insurance	Toyota	The Coffee Club
2010	Nike	WOW Sight & Sound	WOW Sight & Sound	NRMA Insurance	Toyota	The Coffee Club
2011	Nike	NRMA Insurance	WOW Sight and Sound	NRMA Insurance	HANS	Sportingbet
2012	Nike	NRMA Insurance	First Mac Home Loans	NRMA Insurance	HANS	Sportingbet
2013	Nike	NRMA Insurance	First Mac Home Loans	Arrow Energy	HANS	Sportingbet
