= Brisbane Broncos Stadiums =

This article shows various records for the venues that the Brisbane Broncos have played at.
P= Played, W=Win, D=Draw, L=Loss, F=Points For, A=Points Against, %=Win Percentage

== Home Games ==
Current to the end of Round 3, 2008 season. Includes Away Games played at these Stadiums
Stadium	Details							Crowds			
Stadium	P	W	D	L	F	A	%	Lowest	Highest	Total	Average
ANZ Stadium	122	95	4	23	3,667	1,719	78%	8,751	58,912	3,186,929	26,122
Lang Park/Suncorp Stadium	120	76	0	44	2,821	1,986	63%	11,419	50,612	3,119,794	25,998

=== Average Home Crowds ===
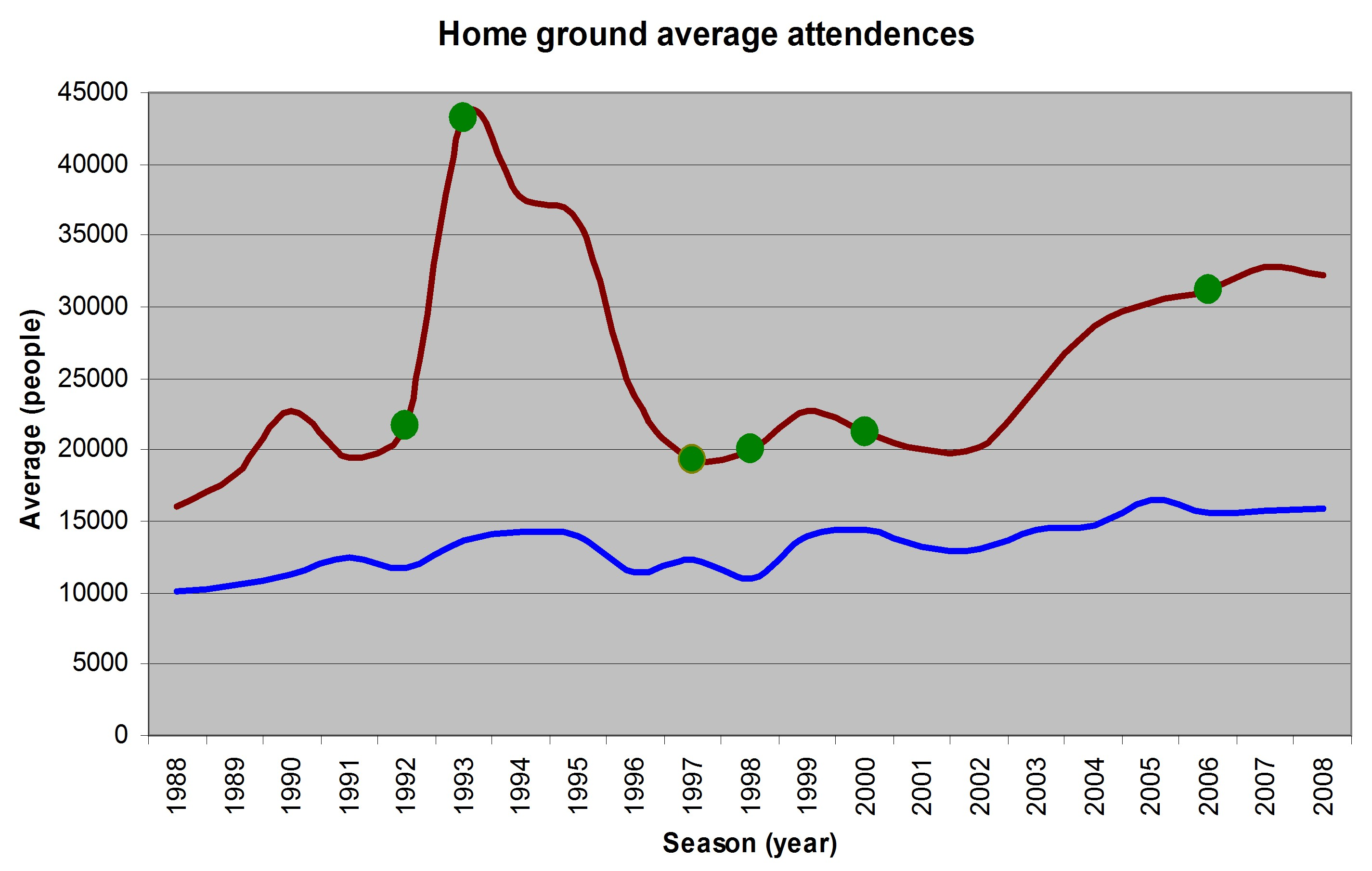
The season attendance averages of the Broncos (Red) home games against the average home attendances of all teams (Blue) in that competition. 2008 season correct to Round 7 home game, and green dot represents premiership win that year.

Year	Home Ground	Average Crowd
1988	Lang Park	16,141
1989	Lang Park	18,217
1990	Lang Park	22,709
1991	Lang Park	19,463
1992	Lang Park	21,687
1993	ANZ Stadium	43,200
1994	ANZ Stadium	37,705
1995	ANZ Stadium	35,902
1996	ANZ Stadium	23,712
1997	ANZ Stadium	19,298
1998	ANZ Stadium	20,073
1999	ANZ Stadium	22,763
2000	ANZ Stadium	21,239
2001	ANZ Stadium	20,035
2002	ANZ Stadium	20,131
2003	ANZ Stadium & Suncorp Stadium	24,326
2004	Suncorp Stadium	28,667
2005	Suncorp Stadium	30,331
2006	Suncorp Stadium	31,208
2007	Suncorp Stadium	32,868
2008	Suncorp Stadium	33,426
2009	Suncorp Stadium	34,587
2010	Suncorp Stadium	35,032
2011	Suncorp Stadium	33,209
2012	Suncorp Stadium	33,377
2013	Suncorp Stadium	38,480
2014	Suncorp Stadium	39,354
2015	Suncorp Stadium	44,140*

* Season in progress (2015).

=== Suncorp Stadium (Lang Park) ===
Crowd	Opposition	Round/Year
50,859	Manly-Warringah Sea Eagles	Round 26, 2011
50,612	North Queensland Cowboys	Round 3, 2008
50,466	Melbourne Storm	Finals Week 2, 2008
50,416	North Queensland Cowboys	Round 1, 2007
50,387	St George Illawarra Dragons	Finals Week 1, 2006
50,225	St George Illawarra Dragons	Finals Week 2, 2009
50,109	South Sydney Rabbitohs	Round 19, 2009
49,571	Canterbury Bulldogs	Round 23, 2004
48,995	St George Illawarra Dragons	Round 23, 2005
48,943	New Zealand Warriors	Finals Week 1, 2011

=== ANZ Stadium ===
Crowd	Opposition	Round/year
58,912	Cronulla-Sutherland Sharks	1997 Super League Grand Final
58,593	St. George Dragons	Round 22, 1993
57,212	Gold Coast Seagulls	Round 12, 1993
54,751	Canterbury-Bankstown Bulldogs	Round 17, 1993
54,645	Auckland Warriors	Round 22, 1995
54,220	Wigan Warriors	1994 World Club Challenge
51,517	Parramatta Eels	Round 3, 1993
49,607	South Queensland Crushers	Round 4, 1995
47,486	Balmain Tigers	Round 22, 1994
46,001	Canberra Raiders	Round 4, 1993

== Away Games ==
Current to the end of Round 2, 2008
Stadium	Details							Crowds			
Stadium	P	W	D	L	F	A	%	Lowest	Highest	Total	Average
Adelaide Oval	2	2	0	0	40	28	100%	17,633	18,892	36,525	18,263
W.A.C.A	2	2	0	0	48	30	100%	11,109	10,735	21,844	10,922
Bluetongue Stadium	1	1	0	0	42	14	100%	10,265	10,265	10,265	10,265
Optus Oval	1	1	0	0	36	14	100%	14,672	14,672	14,672	14,672
Dairy Farmers Stadium	14	11	1	2	356	185	79%	21,759	30,302	364,677	26,048
North Sydney Oval	8	6	0	2	171	108	75%	5,803	20,838	100,750	12,594
Seagulls Stadium	4	3	0	1	99	73	75%	11,650	13,423	51,094	12,774
Campbelltown Stadium	11	7	2	2	284	170	73%	5,755	15,376	112,560	10,233
Parramatta Stadium	18	13	0	5	430	323	72%	6,044	20,353	245,990	13,666
Sydney Football Stadium	45	31	1	13	1051	692	69%	3,011	42,329	1,021,591	22,702
Belmore Sports Ground	6	4	0	2	140	102	67%	5,246	10,962	53,002	8,834
Carrara Stadium	3	2	0	1	100	55	67%	13,126	22,688	51,627	17,209
Oki Jubilee Stadium	8	5	0	3	144	117	63%	6,691	17,025	87,488	10,936
Marathon Stadium	17	10	0	7	331	317	59%	11,271	30,220	392,350	23,079
Telstra Stadium	12	7	0	5	252	186	58%	6,537	94,277	396,389	33,032
Mt Smart Stadium	11	6	0	5	231	195	55%	7,746	19,220	192,627	17,512
WIN Stadium	13	7	0	6	263	239	54%	6,121	17,287	172,520	13,270
CUA Stadium	18	10	0	8	360	311	56%	6,318	20,043	237,471	13,193
Sydney Showground	2	1	0	1	52	31	50%	16,492	16,642	33,134	16,567
Canberra Stadium	15	7	1	7	267	295	47%	8,609	24,801	244,711	16,314
Toyota Park	16	7	0	9	220	322	44%	6,246	19,078	201,896	12,619
Leichhardt Oval	8	3	1	4	108	108	44%	7,023	16,927	85,044	10,631
Brookvale Oval	14	4	1	9	183	271	29%	10,781	25,549	230,856	16,490
Olympic Park	8	2	0	6	118	200	25%	10,308	16,473	109,005	13,626
Telstra Dome	1	0	0	1	28	32	0%	15,470	15,470	15,470	15,470
Breakers Stadium	1	0	0	1	6	24	0%	7,124	7,124	7,124	7,124
Carlaw Park	1	0	0	1	10	20	0%	16,236	16,236	16,236	16,236
Seiffert Oval	1	0	0	1	6	27	0%	18,272	18,272	18,272	18,272
