= 1994 Brisbane Broncos season =

Coordinates: 27.558333°S 153.062222°E

Seasons
- 1993 1995

The 1994 Brisbane Broncos season was the seventh in the club's history. As defending Premiers the Broncos competed in the NSWRL's 1994 Winfield Cup competition, finishing the regular season 5th (out of 16). They then progressed as far as the Semi-finals where a one-point loss to the North Sydney Bears saw them knocked out. Brisbane also hosted and lost the 1994 World Club Challenge to England's Wigan.

== Season summary ==
In the English spring of 1994 it was announced that the Brisbane Broncos club was buying the London Crusaders, who would be renamed 'London Broncos'.

New South Wales Rugby League season 1994 started in fine fashion for Brisbane. They cruised through to the final of the Tooheys Challenge Cup for the fifth time, but were defeated by the South Sydney Rabbitohs in the decider. In the first month of the competition, they went on to win just one game, despite having had a successful season prior to the premiership.

Behind the scenes, Broncos chief executive John Ribot sent his first report on the Super League concept to News Ltd chief executive Ken Cowley.

On-field Brisbane continued to struggle, with frustration reaching boiling point against the Newcastle Knights. Referee Greg McCallum sinbinned Allan Langer for dissent as the Knights beat the Broncos for the first time. More disappointment came when Wigan avenged their 1992 loss by winning the 1994 World Club Challenge at ANZ Stadium mid-season.

A late season revival catapulted the Broncos into fifth spot, narrowly beating out the Illawarra Steelers for a spot in the finals. A tight contest against Manly-Warringah which resulted in 16-4 victory revived some hope of a 'three-peat'. The following week they played against the North Sydney Bears, and after trailing 14-4 the Broncos staged a comeback to level at 14-14. In the end, a Jason Taylor field goal won the game for North Sydney 15-14 shortly before full-time.

== Match results ==
Round	Opponent	Result	Bro.	Opp.	Date	Venue	Crowd	Position
1	Parramatta Eels	Draw	18	18	12 Mar	ANZ Stadium	31,701	7/16
2	Gold Coast Seagulls	Loss	12	25	18 Mar	Carrara Stadium	22,688	14/16
3	St George Dragons	Loss	18	22	25 Mar	ANZ Stadium	37,749	14/16
4	Eastern Suburbs	Win	44	12	1 Apr	Sydney Football Stadium	20,216	11/16
5	Penrith Panthers	Win	37	6	10 Apr	ANZ Stadium	44,511	6/16
6	North Sydney Bears	Loss	10	11	16 Apr	ANZ Stadium	35,917	8/16
7	Balmain Tigers	Win	36	14	23 Apr	Princes Park	14,672	7/16
8	Cronulla Sharks	Win	34	2	1 May	ANZ Stadium	34,060	5/16
9	Manly Sea Eagles	Loss	11	21	8 May	Brookvale Oval	18,309	8/16
10	Western Suburbs Magpies	Win	40	10	15 May	ANZ Stadium	30,762	7/16
11*	Illawarra Steelers	Loss	4	26	27 May	Wollongong	14,020	8/16
WCC	Wigan Warriors	Loss	14	20	1 Jun	ANZ Stadium	54,220	8/16
12*	Canterbury Bulldogs	Win	12	10	10 Jun	ANZ Stadium	38,302	8/16
13*	Canberra Raiders	Loss	10	29	26 Jun	Bruce Stadium	23,775	9/16
14	South Sydney Rabbitohs	Win	40	10	1 Jul	ANZ Stadium	36,549	8/16
15	Newcastle Knights	Loss	10	24	10 Jul	Newcastle ISC	26,743	9/16
16	Parramatta Eels	Win	36	6	17 Jul	Parramatta Stadium	11,358	9/16
17	Gold Coast Seagulls	Win	48	12	24 Jul	ANZ Stadium	36,510	5/16
18	St George Dragons	Win	28	16	30 Jul	Kogarah Oval	9,106	5/16
19	Eastern Suburbs	Win	34	16	7 Aug	ANZ Stadium	41,211	5/16
20	Penrith Panthers	Loss	6	22	14 Aug	Penrith	10,944	5/16
21	North Sydney Bears	Win	17	0	19 Aug	North Sydney Oval	20,838	5/16
22	Balmain Tigers	Win	41	6	28 Aug	ANZ Stadium	47,486	5/16
Qualif. Final	Manly Sea Eagles	Win	16	4	4 Sep	Sydney Football Stadium	34,891	
Semi Final	North Sydney Bears	Loss	14	15	10 Sep	Sydney Football Stadium	36,011	

*Game following a State of Origin match

== Season Ladder ==
	Team	Pld	W	D	L	PF	PA	PD	Pts
1	Canterbury-Bankstown	22	18	0	4	537	340	+197	36
2	North Sydney	22	17	1	4	517	291	+226	35
3	Canberra	22	17	0	5	677	298	+379	34
4	Manly-Warringah	22	16	1	5	605	311	+294	33
5	Brisbane Broncos	22	13	1	8	544	316	+228	27
6	Illawarra	22	11	3	8	484	387	+97	25
7	Cronulla-Sutherland	22	12	0	10	432	401	+31	24
8	Penrith	22	10	2	10	404	448	-44	22
9	South Sydney	22	9	1	12	401	569	-168	19
10	Newcastle Knights	22	9	0	13	427	458	-31	18
11	St. George	22	9	0	13	386	497	-111	18
12	Parramatta	22	7	1	14	350	474	-124	15
13	Western Suburbs	22	6	2	14	439	650	-211	14
14	Eastern Suburbs	22	6	1	15	344	513	-169	13
15	Gold Coast Seagulls	22	5	1	16	363	618	-255	11
16	Balmain	22	4	0	18	303	642	-339	8

== Scorers ==
Player	Tries	Goals	FG	Points
Julian O'Neill	8	47/78	3	129
Steve Renouf	23	0	0	92
Wendell Sailor	14	0	0	56
Allan Langer	11	2/2	1	49
Terry Matterson	3	18/35	0	48
Michael Hancock	11	0	0	44
Willie Carne	8	0	0	32
John Plath	6	0	0	24
Kevin Walters	5	0	0	20
Chris McKenna	4	0	0	16
Alan Cann	3	0	0	12
Brett Galea	2	0	0	8
Andrew Gee	2	0	0	8
Peter Ryan	2	0	0	8
John Driscoll	1	0	0	4
Mark Hohn	1	0	0	4
Paul Hauff	1	0	0	4
Chris Johns	1	0	0	4
Paul Morris	1	0	0	4
Brad Thorn	1	0	0	4
Kerrod Walters	1	0	0	4

== Honours ==
=== League ===
- Nil

=== Club ===
- Player of the year: Allan Langer
- Rookie of the year: Brad Thorn / John Driscoll
- Back of the year: Michael Hancock
- Forward of the year: Andrew Gee
- Club man of the year: John Plath

== See also ==
- History of the Brisbane Broncos
