= 1995 Brisbane Broncos season =

Coordinates: 27.558333°S 153.062222°E

Seasons
- 1994 1996

The 1995 Brisbane Broncos season was the eighth in the club's history. They competed in the Australian Rugby League's 1995 Winfield Cup premiership, finishing in the regular season 3rd (out of 20) and making it to the semi-finals before being knocked out by eventual premiers, the Sydney Bulldogs.

== Season summary ==
The team was hoping to avenge their on-field disappointment of 1994. They started perfectly, winning the final of the Tooheys Cup against Cronulla and then their first seven premiership matches in their best start ever. But a 26-0 humiliation against Canberra sent the Broncos on another tumble that saw them lose four matches in five weeks. Despite being free of State of Origin representative duties due to their affiliation with Super League, the Broncos had again faltered mid-season, but went on to win their last 6 matches of the regular season.

In round 13, future Clive Churchill Medallist and 2006 premiership captain Darren Lockyer made his first grade debut against the Parramatta Eels at Parramatta Stadium, with the Broncos coming from 14–6 down at half-time to win 60–14.

In the finals though, the Broncos suffered close defeats at the hands of defending Premiers Canberra and eventual 1995 winners the Canterbury Bulldogs. An injury to Allan Langer resulted in crucial missed tackles in both matches by the Brisbane skipper, and played a contributing factor in the Broncos' failure to win.

== Match results ==
Round	Opponent	Result	Bro.	Opp.	Date	Venue	Crowd	Position
1	Auckland Warriors	Win	25	22	10 Mar	Ericsson Stadium	29,220	8/20
2	Western Suburbs Magpies	Win	28	2	17 Mar	ANZ Stadium	32,860	5/20
3	Illawarra Steelers	Win	34	20	26 Mar	Wollongong	13,127	4/20
4	South Queensland Crushers	Win	32	0	31 Mar	ANZ Stadium	49,607	3/20
5	North Queensland Cowboys	Win	20	12	8 Apr	Stockland Stadium	24,855	3/20
6	St George Dragons	Win	36	18	17 Apr	ANZ Stadium	39,843	2/20
7	Sydney Bulldogs	Win	13	8	21 Apr	ANZ Stadium	44,395	2/20
8	Canberra Raiders	Loss	0	26	28 Apr	Bruce Stadium	23,740	4/20
9	Western Reds	Win	32	8	7 May	ANZ Stadium	32,192	4/20
10	North Sydney Bears	Win	18	9	19 May	North Sydney Oval	13,092	3/20
11	Manly Sea Eagles	Loss	4	23	4 Jun	Brookvale Oval	25,549	4/20
12	Illawarra Steelers	Loss	18	34	18 Jun	ANZ Stadium	31,106	4/20
13	Parramatta Eels	Win	60	14	25 Jun	Parramatta Stadium	9,058	4/20
14	Sydney City Roosters	Win	36	20	2 Jul	ANZ Stadium	30,732	4/20
15	Newcastle Knights	Loss	10	32	9 Jul	Newcastle ISC	29,359	4/20
16	Cronulla Sharks	Loss	22	36	16 Jul	ANZ Stadium	28,844	4/20
17	Sydney Tigers	Win	40	18	23 Jul	Parramatta Stadium	6,044	4/20
18	Penrith Panthers	Win	17	12	30 Jul	ANZ Stadium	25,902	4/20
19	Western Suburbs Magpies	Win	28	18	4 Aug	Campbelltown Sports Ground	11,100	4/20
20	South Sydney Rabbitohs	Win	56	6	13 Aug	ANZ Stadium	24,801	3/20
21	Gold Coast Seagulls	Win	27	20	20 Aug	Seagulls Stadium	11,650	3/20
22	Auckland Warriors	Win	44	6	27 Aug	ANZ Stadium	55,645	3/20
Qualif. Final	Canberra Raiders	Loss	8	14	2 Sep	Suncorp Stadium	40,187	
Semi Final	Sydney Bulldogs	Loss	10	24	10 Sep	Sydney Football Stadium	34,087	

== Season Ladder ==
Auckland deducted 2 points
	Team	Pld	W	D	L	PF	PA	PD	Pts
1	Manly-Warringah	22	20	0	2	687	248	+439	40
2	Canberra	22	20	0	2	634	255	+379	40
3	Brisbane Broncos	22	17	0	5	600	364	+236	34
4	Cronulla-Sutherland	22	16	0	6	516	287	+229	32
5	Newcastle Knights	22	15	0	7	549	396	+153	30
6	Sydney Bulldogs	22	14	0	8	468	352	+116	28
7	St. George	22	13	0	9	583	382	+201	26
8	North Sydney	22	11	2	9	542	331	+211	24
9	Sydney City Roosters	22	12	0	10	466	406	+60	24
10	Auckland	22	13	0	9	544	493	+51	24
11	Western Reds	22	11	0	11	361	549	-188	22
12	Illawarra	22	10	1	11	519	431	+88	21
13	Western Suburbs	22	10	0	12	459	534	-75	20
14	Penrith	22	9	0	13	481	484	-3	18
15	Sydney Tigers	22	7	0	15	309	591	-282	14
16	South Queensland	22	6	1	15	303	502	-199	13
17	Gold Coast Seagulls	22	4	1	17	350	628	-278	9
18	South Sydney	22	4	1	17	319	686	-367	9
19	Parramatta	22	3	0	19	310	690	-380	6
20	North Queensland Cowboys	22	2	0	20	269	660	-391	4

== Scorers ==
Player	Tries	Goals	FG	Points
Julian O'Neill	8	79/106	3	193
Michael Hancock	15	0	0	60
Steve Renouf	15	0	0	60
Allan Langer	12	1/1	0	50
Darren Smith	11	0	0	44
Wendell Sailor	9	0	0	36
Willie Carne	8	0	0	34
Kevin Walters	7	0	0	28
Darren Lockyer	3	4/6	1	21
Peter Ryan	5	0	0	20
Scott Blacker	4	0	0	16
Glenn Lazarus	3	0	0	12
Chris Johns	2	0	0	8
Terry Matterson	1	2/3	0	8
John Plath	2	0	0	8
Kerrod Walters	2	0	0	8
Gavin Allen	1	0	0	4
Andrew Gee	1	0	0	4
Steele Retchless	1	0	0	4

== Honours ==
=== League ===
- Nil

=== Club ===
- Player of the year: Allan Langer
- Rookie of the year: Darren Lockyer
- Back of the year: Allan Langer
- Forward of the year: Glenn Lazarus
- Club man of the year: Chris Johns

== See also ==
- Australian Rugby League season 1995
- History of the Brisbane Broncos
