= 1992 Brisbane Broncos season =

Coordinates: 27°27′53″S 153°0′34″E

Seasons
- 1991 1993

The 1992 Brisbane Broncos season was the fifth in the club's history and they competed in the NSWRL's 1992 Winfield Cup premiership. Under new captain Allan Langer they finished the regular season 1st to claim their first minor premiership before going on to play in their first grand final and win, transporting the Winfield Cup trophy north of the New South Wales border for the first time. The Broncos then also became the first Australian club to win the World Club Challenge.

== Season summary ==
After the retirement of Gene Miles, the captaincy role fell onto half-back Allan Langer for the 1992 season. Despite failing to make the finals the previous season, the Broncos were at the top of the ladder for most of this year's competition, losing just four matches to gain their first minor premiership with a 6-point buffer over second placed St George Dragons.

In their first Grand Final appearance the Broncos comprehensively defeated the Dragons 28-8 at the Sydney Football Stadium and finally the Winfield Cup was transported to Queensland for the first time. A month later, the Broncos played in the 1992 World Club Challenge match against dominant British champions Wigan. No Australian club had yet gone to England and won, and many expected the Broncos to follow that trend. They didn't, smashing the cherry pickers in emphatic fashion 22-8.

Wigan and the Broncos met again in the final of the 1992 World Sevens tournament, which Brisbane lost.

== Match results ==
Round	Opponent	Result	Bro.	Opp.	Date	Venue	Crowd	Position
1	Cronulla-Sutherland Sharks	Win	30	2	20 Mar	Lang Park	19,577	1/16
2	Gold Coast Seagulls	Win	24	18	29 Mar	Lang Park	23,192	2/16
3	Canberra Raiders	Win	24	16	5 Apr	Bruce Stadium	16,037	3/16
4	Penrith Panthers	Loss	10	24	11 Apr	Lang Park	18,550	4/16
5	Manly-Warringah Sea Eagles	Win	28	12	19 Apr	Brookvale Oval	19,084	4/16
6	Newcastle Knights	Win	12	8	26 Apr	Newcastle ISC	28,821	2/16
7*	Illawarra Steelers	Loss	8	10	10 May	Lang Park	14,524	2/16
8*	St George Dragons	Win	20	18	24 May	Adelaide Oval	18,892	2/16
9	South Sydney Rabbitohs	Win	26	18	31 May	Lang Park	15,502	2/16
10*	Canterbury-Bankstown Bulldogs	Loss	24	28	7 Jun	Belmore Sports Ground	10,626	2/16
11	North Sydney Bears	Win	28	22	14 Jun	Lang Park	19,515	2/16
12	Balmain Tigers	Win	26	10	21 Jun	Lang Park	24,902	1/16
13	Parramatta Eels	Win	20	4	28 Jun	Parramatta Stadium	8,034	1/16
14	Eastern Suburbs Roosters	Win	46	22	5 Jul	Lang Park	23,906	1/16
15	Western Suburbs Magpies	Loss	16	25	12 Jul	Campbelltown Sports Ground	10,171	1/16
16	Cronulla-Sutherland Sharks	Win	20	16	19 Jul	Endeavour Field	6,246	1/16
17	Gold Coast Seagulls	Win	30	10	26 Jul	Seagulls Stadium	13,401	1/16
18	Canberra Raiders	Win	28	12	31 Jul	Lang Park	24,192	1/16
19	Penrith Panthers	Win	12	6	7 Aug	Penrith Football Stadium	12,852	1/16
20	Manly-Warringah Sea Eagles	Win	22	10	14 Aug	Lang Park	25,867	1/16
21	Newcastle Knights	Win	37	20	23 Aug	Lang Park	28,828	1/16
22	Illawarra Steelers	Win	15	8	28 Aug	Wollongong	14,512	1/16
Semi Final	Illawarra Steelers	Win	22	12	13 Sep	Sydney Football Stadium	38,859	
GRAND FINAL	St George Dragons	Win	28	8	27 Sep	Sydney Football Stadium	41,560	
WCC	Wigan Warriors	Win	22	8	31 Oct	Central Park	17,460	

*Game following a State of Origin match

== Scorers ==
Player	Tries	Goals	FG	Points
Terry Matterson	2	74/108	0	156
Allan Langer	12	0	1	49
Steve Renouf	12	0	0	48
Julian O'Neill	6	11/14	1	47
Willie Carne	11	0	0	44
Kevin Walters	11	0	0	44
Michael Hancock	10	0	0	40
Alan Cann	6	0	0	24
Chris Johns	6	0	0	24
Kerrod Walters	4	0	0	16
Pat Savage	3	0	0	12
Mark Hohn	2	0	0	8
Glenn Lazarus	2	0	0	8
Brett Plowman	2	0	0	8
Gavin Allen	1	0	0	4
Tony Currie	1	0	0	4
Trevor Gillmeister	1	0	0	4
Paul Hauff	1	0	0	4
Willie Morganson	1	0	0	4
John Plath	1	0	0	4
Peter Ryan	1	0	0	4

== Grand final ==
                              Brisbane Broncos vs. St. George Dragons

Player	Position	Player
Julian O'Neill	Fullback	Mick Potter
Michael Hancock	Wing	Ricky Walford
Steve Renouf	Centre	Mark Coyne
Chris Johns	Centre	Graeme Bradley
Willie Carne	Wing	Ian Herron
Kevin Walters	Five-eighth	Michael Beattie (c)
Allan Langer (c)	Halfback	Noel Goldthorpe
Glenn Lazarus	Prop	Tony Priddle
Kerrod Walters	Hooker	Wayne Collins
Gavin Allen	Prop	Neil Tierney
Trevor Gillmeister	Second Row	David Barnhill
Alan Cann	Second Row	Scott Gourley
Terry Matterson	Lock	Jeff Hardey
Mark Hohn	Interchange	Brad Mackay
Andrew Gee	Interchange	Rex Terp
John Plath	Interchange	Tony Smith
Tony Currie	Interchange	Matthew Elliott
Wayne Bennett	Coach	Brian Smith

Brisbane 28 (Tries: Langer 2, Cann 2, Renouf; Goals: Matterson 4/5)

defeated

St George 8 (Tries: Walford, Gourley; Goals: Herron 0/2 )

Halftime: Brisbane 6-4

Referee: Greg McCallum

Stadium: Sydney Football Stadium

Crowd: 41, 560

Clive Churchill Medal: Allan Langer (Brisbane)

== Honours ==
=== League ===
- Nil

=== Club ===
- Player of the year: Kerrod Walters
- Rookie of the year: Brett Galea
- Back of the year: Allan Langer
- Forward of the year: Trevor Gillmeister
- Club man of the year: Allan Langer
