= 1996 Brisbane Broncos season =

Coordinates: 27.558333°S 153.062222°E

Seasons
- 1995 1997

The 1996 Brisbane Broncos season was the ninth in the club's history. They competed in the Australian Rugby League's 1996 Optus Cup premiership and finished the regular season in second place on the ladder, progressing as far as the semi-finals.

== Season summary ==
In 1996 the Broncos once again started solidly, went through a losing streak mid-season but recovered to finish strongly, conforming to the pattern of previous seasons. However again they capitulated, losing to North Sydney and Cronulla to lose their fifth straight finals match. Gorden Tallis, at the time still contracted to the St George, chose to sit out this season rather than play for the Dragons as he had also signed to play for the Broncos in 1996. At the end of the 1996 season, players Kerrod Walters, Alan Cann, Willie Carne and Michael Hancock were asked to leave the club, as they could no longer be guaranteed regular places in the Broncos' first grade team.

== Match results ==
Round	Opponent	Result	Bro.	Opp.	Date	Venue	Crowd	Position
1	Auckland Warriors		Forfeited					16/20
2	Western Suburbs Magpies	Win	36	14	31 Mar	Campbelltown Sports Ground	9,106	7/20
3	Illawarra Steelers	Win	54	4	6 Apr	ANZ Stadium	24,577	3/20
4	South Queensland Crushers	Win	28	8	12 Apr	Suncorp Stadium	34,263	2/20
5	North Queensland Cowboys	Win	58	14	21 Apr	ANZ Stadium	18,609	2/20
6	St George Dragons	Win	22	4	27 Apr	Kogarah Oval	13,090	2/20
7	Canterbury Bulldogs	Win	30	8	4 May	Belmore Oval	5,246	2/20
8	Canberra Raiders	Win	50	16	12 May	ANZ Stadium	37,248	2/20
9*	Western Reds	Win	22	14	24 May	WACA Ground	10,735	2/20
10*	North Sydney Bears	Loss	10	16	7 June	ANZ Stadium	25,092	3/20
11	Manly Sea Eagles	Loss	4	18	14 Jun	ANZ Stadium	19,837	4/20
12*	Illawarra Steelers	Loss	6	14	23 Jun	Wollongong	6,121	5/20
13	Parramatta Eels	Win	30	24	30 Jun	ANZ Stadium	22,412	4/20
14	Sydney City Roosters	Loss	10	12	8 Jul	Sydney Football Stadium	35,075	5/20
15	Newcastle Knights	Win	24	19	15 Jul	ANZ Stadium	28,600	5/20
16	Cronulla Sharks	Win	15	12	20 Jul	Endeavour Field	19,078	4/20
17	Sydney Tigers	Win	26	6	26 Jul	ANZ Stadium	15,129	3/20
18	Penrith Panthers	Win	50	20	4 Aug	Penrith Park	6,318	3/20
19	Western Suburbs Magpies	Win	36	6	10 Aug	ANZ Stadium	19,866	3/20
20	South Sydney Rabbitohs	Win	20	18	17 Aug	Sydney Football Stadium	3,011	2/20
21	Gold Coast Chargers	Win	38	10	25 Aug	ANZ Stadium	25,749	2/20
22	Auckland Warriors	Win	38	6	30 Aug	Mt Smart Stadium	26,000	2/20
Qualif. Final	North Sydney Bears	Loss	16	21	7 Sep	Suncorp Stadium	25,983	
Semi Final	Cronulla Sharks	Loss	16	22	14 Sep	Sydney Football Stadium	27,665	

*Game following a State of Origin match

== Ladder ==
	Team	Pld	W	D	L	PF	PA	PD	Pts
1	Manly-Warringah	22	18	0	4	549	191	+358	36
2	Brisbane	21	17	0	4	607	263	+344	34
3	North Sydney	22	15	2	5	598	325	+273	32
4	Sydney City	22	15	1	6	521	321	+200	31
5	Cronulla-Sutherland	21	14	2	5	399	268	+131	30
6	Canberra	21	13	1	7	538	384	+154	27
7	St. George	21	12	1	8	443	360	+83	27
8	Western Suburbs	22	12	1	9	394	434	−40	25
9	Newcastle	21	10	1	10	416	388	+28	23
10	Canterbury	21	11	0	10	375	378	−3	22
11	Auckland	21	10	0	11	412	427	−15	22
12	Balmain	22	11	0	11	319	459	−140	22
13	Parramatta	21	9	1	11	404	415	−11	21
14	Illawarra	22	8	0	14	403	444	−41	16
15	Penrith	21	7	1	13	363	464	−101	15
16	Western Reds	21	6	1	14	313	420	−107	13
17	North Queensland	21	6	0	15	288	643	−355	12
18	Gold Coast	22	5	1	16	359	521	−162	11
19	South Sydney	22	5	1	16	314	634	−320	11
20	South Queensland	21	3	0	18	220	496	−276	8

== Scorers ==
Player	Tries	Goals	FG	Points
Willie Carne	7	59/94	0	146
Steve Renouf	19	0	0	76
Darren Smith	14	0	0	56
Darren Lockyer	7	12/21	0	54
Michael Hancock	13	0	0	52
Allan Langer	11	2/5	1	49
Kevin Walters	10	0	0	40
Wendell Sailor	9	0	0	36
Robbie Ross	8	0	0	32
Kerrod Walters	5	0	0	20
Tonie Carroll	4	0	0	16
John Plath	3	0	0	12
Peter Ryan	3	0	0	12
Ben Walker	1	3/6	0	10
Brad Thorn	2	0	0	8
Alan Cann	1	0	0	4
Brett Galea	1	0	0	4
Paul Hauff	1	0	0	4
Glenn Lazarus	1	0	0	4
Shane Webcke	1	0	0	4

== Honours ==
=== League ===
- Nil

=== Club ===
- Player of the year: Allan Langer
- Rookie of the year: Tonie Carroll
- Back of the year: Allan Langer
- Forward of the year: Peter Ryan
- Club man of the year: Chris Johns / Gorden Tallis
