= Andrew Gee =

Andrew Gee may refer to:

- Andrew Gee (rugby league) (born 1970), Australian rugby league administrator
- Andrew Gee (politician) (born 1968), Australian politician

== See also ==
- Osher Günsberg, Australian television personality formerly known as Andrew G
