= 1998 State of Origin series =

Australian rugby league series

- Won by: Queensland (9th title)
- Series margin: 2-1
- Points scored: 106
- Attendance: 115,469 (ave. 38,490 per match)
- Top points scorer(s): Darren Lockyer (14)
- Top try scorer(s): Walters, Langer, Brasher, McGregor (2)

The 1998 State of Origin series saw the 17th time that the annual three-game series between the Queensland and New South Wales representative rugby league football teams was contested entirely under 'state of origin' selection rules. The return of Super League-aligned stars to Origin following the end of the game's crippling civil war meant the stampeding Brisbane Broncos players were back - to the chagrin of the Blues. The series was notable for being the first in which no team won a game at home.

== Game I ==
Friday, 22 May 1998

New South Wales	23–24	Queensland
Rod Wishart (4 - 1t); Tim Brasher (4 - 1t); Laurie Daley (4 - 1t); Brad Fittler (4 - 1t); Steve Menzies (4 - 1t); Andrew Johns (3 - 1g,1fg)	(Report)	(8 - 4g) Darren Lockyer (4 - 1t) Kevin Walters (4 - 1t) Steve Price (4 - 1t) Allan Langer (4 - 1t) Tonie Carroll

Sydney Football Stadium, Sydney
Attendance: 36,070
Referee: Bill Harrigan
Player of the Match: Allan Langer

Game I was a classic Origin encounter with each side scrambling to gain ascendancy in front of a boisterous Sydney crowd. The Maroons capitalised on mistakes from their opposition to score twice early in the second half before the mercurial Brad Fittler crossed to regain the lead for New South Wales. When Steve Menzies scored close to full-time to give the Blues a 23-18 lead it seemed that they were heading for victory.

But with barely a minute remaining and Queensland stuck deep in their own territory, their five-eighth Kevin Walters produced the play of the series as he kicked ahead for replacement back Ben Ikin to regather. The Blues tried desperately to hold on for the few final tackles, but Walters destroyed their hopes by sending centre Tonie Carroll over alongside the posts. Darren Lockyer's conversion on debut after the siren gave Queensland a miracle 24-23 victory. It was a personal triumph for Walters coming only a few months after the death of his wife Kim.

== Game II ==
Friday, 5 June 1998

Queensland	10–26	New South Wales
Wendell Sailor (4 - 1t); Matt Sing (4 - 1t); Darren Lockyer (2 - 1g)	(Report)	(8 - 2t) Paul McGregor (6 - 3g) Andrew Johns (4 - 1t) Brad Fittler (4 - 1t) Adam MacDougall (4 - 1t) Tim Brasher

Suncorp Stadium, Brisbane
Attendance: 40,447
Referee: Bill Harrigan
Player of the Match: Rodney Howe

In Game II, after falling behind early to a Wendell Sailor try, the Blues took control in the volatile surroundings of Suncorp Stadium. New South Wales centre Paul McGregor, replacing Andrew Ettingshausen in the starting line-up, scored twice and Brad Fittler added a third to give the visitors a commanding 20-6 lead from which the Maroons never recovered.

Andrew Johns was superb during the Blues' onslaught while Laurie Daley set up the try that levelled the score following Sailor's third-minute opener. A Tim Brasher try shortly after the break ended any hopes of another come-from-behind Queensland win and the final 26-10 scoreline was a fair reflection of the Blues domination over their opposition.

== Game III ==
Before the Game III return to the Sydney Football Stadium for the decider there was little warning of the problems the New South Wales team were about to encounter when they were flattened by injury and illness. Six players from the selected squad including props Paul Harragon and Rodney Howe and inspirational hooker Geoff Toovey were forced to withdraw prior to the game.

Friday, 19 June 1998

New South Wales	4–19	Queensland
Ken McGuinness (4 - 1t)	(Report)	(4 - 1t) Kevin Walters (4- 1t) Ben Ikin (4- 1t) Allan Langer (4 - 2g) Darren Lockyer (2 - 1g) Robbie O'Davis (1 - 1fg) Jason Smith

Sydney Football Stadium, Sydney
Attendance: 39,952
Referee: Bill Harrigan
Player of the Match: Shane Webcke

Queensland emerged full of running, tries to Walters, dummying his way over and then Ikin, giving them a 12-4 lead before Allan Langer wrapped up the series with a late try. A Jason Smith field goal rounded out the impressive Queensland 19-4 win.

== New South Wales squad ==
Position	Game 1	Game 2	Game 3
Fullback	Tim Brasher		
Wing	Rod Wishart		
Centre	Andrew Ettingshausen	Paul McGregor	Laurie Daley (c)
Centre	Terry Hill		
Wing	Adam MacDougall		
Five-Eighth	Laurie Daley (c)		Brad Fittler
Halfback	Andrew Johns		
Prop	Rodney Howe		Glenn Lazarus
Hooker	Geoff Toovey		Matthew Johns
Prop	Paul Harragon		Tony Butterfield
Second Row	Dean Pay		David Furner
Second Row	Nik Kosef	David Barnhill	
Lock	Brad Fittler		Jim Dymock
Interchange	David Barnhill	Andrew Ettingshausen	Dean Pay
Interchange	Steve Menzies		
Interchange	Matthew Johns	Nik Kosef	Robbie Kearns
Interchange	Ken McGuinness	Glenn Lazarus	Ken McGuinness
Coach	Tommy Raudonikis		

== Queensland squad ==
Position	Game 1	Game 2	Game 3
Fullback	Darren Lockyer		
Wing	Wendell Sailor		
Centre	Steve Renouf		
Centre	Darren Smith		Ben Ikin
Wing	Matt Sing		Robbie O'Davis
Five-Eighth	Kevin Walters		
Halfback	Allan Langer (c)		
Prop	Shane Webcke		
Hooker	Jason Hetherington		Jamie Goddard
Prop	Gary Larson		
Second Row	Wayne Bartrim	Brad Thorn	Gorden Tallis
Second Row	Jason Smith	Gorden Tallis	Jason Smith
Lock	Peter Ryan	Wayne Bartrim	Darren Smith
Interchange	Ben Ikin		Matt Sing
Interchange	Steve Price		
Interchange	Martin Lang		Peter Ryan
Interchange	Tonie Carroll		Andrew Gee
Coach	Wayne Bennett		

== See also ==
- 1998 NRL season

== Sources ==
- Big League's 25 Years of Origin Collectors' Edition, News Magazines, Surry Hills, Sydney
