= Michael De Vere =

Australia international rugby league footballer

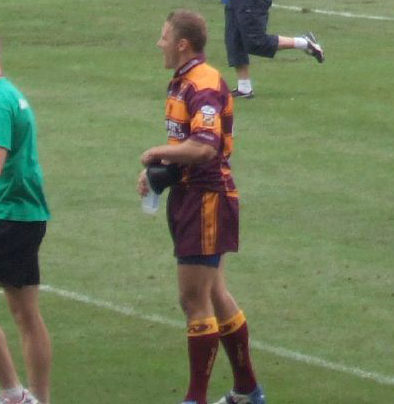

Personal information
- Full name: Michael De Vere
- Born: 11 December 1976 (age 49) Campbelltown, New South Wales, Australia

Playing information
- Position: Centre, Wing
Club
Years	Team	Pld	T	G	FG	P
1997–04	Brisbane Broncos	160	64	403	0	1062
2005–06	Huddersfield Giants	41	8	98	0	228
2009	Brisbane Broncos	1	0	0	0	0
	Total	202	72	501	0	1290
Representative
Years	Team	Pld	T	G	FG	P
2001–04	New South Wales	5	0	2	0	4
2002–03	NSW City	2	2	3	0	14
2003–04	Australia	4	2	4	0	16

Michael De Vere (born 11 December 1976) is an Australian former professional rugby league footballer who played in the 1990s and 2000s. He represented Australia in four tests and New South Wales in five State of Origin matches. A goal-kicking outside back who could play centre, wing or fullback and also a skilful goal-kicker who ended his career having kicked at 76.62%, De Vere played club football for the Brisbane Broncos in the NRL, with whom he won the 1997, 1998 and 2000 premierships. He later played with English club the Huddersfield Giants in the Super League, reaching the 2006 Challenge Cup final. In 2009, he instigated a comeback with the Brisbane Broncos, which only lasted one game before he retired.

== Playing career ==
A product of Campbelltown Warriors junior rugby league club, De Vere spent a year playing with the Appin Dogs in the Group 6 Junior League, before being graded with the St. George Dragons in 1995, although he never played first grade for the Dragons.

=== Brisbane ===
De Vere won the 1997 Brisbane Broncos season's rookie of the year award and also played in their Super League Grand Final win over the Cronulla-Sutherland Sharks. In 1998 De Vere, a last-minute inclusion to the side due to a finger injury to former Kangaroo Tour winger Michael Hancock, scored the opening try in Brisbane's 38–12 1998 NRL grand final win against the Canterbury Bulldogs. The 2000 Brisbane Broncos season's top point-scorer, De Vere made it three premierships in four seasons with the club when he landed three goals in their 2000 NRL grand final win over the Sydney Roosters.

Having won the 2000 NRL Premiership, the Broncos traveled to England to play against 2000's Super League V Champions, St Helens R.F.C. for the 2001 World Club Challenge, with De Vere playing at centre and kicking three goals in Brisbane's loss. Later that season he joined the ranks of Brisbane players (Terry Matterson, Glenn Lazarus, Luke Priddis and Chris Johns) to have represented New South Wales against his Broncos teammates in a State of Origin match. He also set the Broncos record for most goals in a match when he kicked 9/9 in a 50–6 win over the North Queensland Cowboys in 2001. He was again top point-scorer for the Broncos in 2001, 2002 and 2003.

After the 2003 NRL season, De Vere made his test début in the centres for Australia in an end of season test against New Zealand in Auckland, following which he went on the 2003 Kangaroo tour, playing in the final two tests of The Ashes series against Great Britain. In 2004 he was dropped from the New South Wales team after the Blues' narrow 9–8 win in the first match of the series. During the 2004 season, Michael De Vere played his last test for Australia when he was selected on the wing for the Kangaroos 37–10 Anzac Test win over New Zealand in Newcastle. He contributed 12 points with a try and four goals, the only goals he kicked in test football.

De Vere then left Brisbane at the end of the season after again being the club's top-point scorer, to take up a contract with English club Huddersfield Giants, becoming the club's first Australian international player since Pat Devery in the 1950s. At the time he was the Broncos highest ever point scorer with 1,062 points.

=== State of Origin ===
In the 2003 State of Origin series, an incident occurred in game one when De Vere suffered a head wound after a clash with Queensland's Tonie Carroll. The NSW team physician John Orchard used a staple gun to close the wound.

=== Huddersfield ===
De Vere joined the Huddersfield Giants in 2005. He played for Huddersfield in the 2006 Challenge Cup Final at centre and kicked two goals but the Giants lost 12–42 against St. Helens. On 20 November 2006, he announced that he would retire from professional football and return to Brisbane.

The following season at the Broncos' 20-year anniversary celebration, the club announced a list of the 20 best players to play for them to date which included De Vere.

He was set to join the Carina Leagues club as a development/coaching officer in 2007. On 23 January 2009 it was announced that De Vere would return to the Brisbane Broncos for the 2009 season, more than two years after retiring.

The National Rugby League had to approved De Vere's comeback due to concerns over salary cap concessions, given he also worked as a development officer. It was to be De Vere's final playing year in first grade rugby league, and his 10th season with the Brisbane club. De Vere's NRL comeback was short-lived as he only played one game in 2009; he announced his retirement on 7 April 2009.
