= 1993 Brisbane Broncos season =

Coordinates: 27.558333°S 153.062222°E

Seasons
- 1992 1994

The 1993 Brisbane Broncos season was the sixth in the club's history. Coached by Wayne Bennett and captained by Allan Langer, they competed in the NSWRL's 1993 Winfield Cup premiership, finishing the regular season 5th (out of 16) before going on to play in a re-match of the previous year's grand final against the St George Dragons and again win, claiming consecutive premierships. In doing so they also became the first team in history to win the premiership from fifth position.

== Season summary ==
After years of dispute with the Lang Park Trust over brewery advertising, Fourex had pouring rights for Lang Park while Powers Brewing was major sponsor of the Broncos. For the 1993 season the Broncos moved to the Council-owned ANZ Stadium, in suburban Nathan.

Signs of a hangover existed with the club losing two of its first three matches, including their debut at the new home ground against the struggling Parramatta Eels before over 51,000 fans. But the Broncos bounced back, beating the Balmain Tigers 50-0, (the highest winning margin for the club at the time) to establish themselves solidly in the upper echelons of the competition. A last round lapse against St George relegated the Broncos to fifth spot, meaning they had to win four straight elimination games to defend their title. This match also set the club's highest home ground attendance figure with over 58,000 at ANZ Stadium.

In the finals, Brisbane went on to demolish the Manly Sea Eagles' defence in a 36-10 romp. Canberra dropped dead with the loss of Ricky Stuart and the Broncos ran roughshod over them with a 30-12 win. Against the Canterbury Bulldogs in the preliminary final, Brisbane were trailing 16-10 at half time, but Allan Langer scored immediately in the second half to level, then potted a field goal to break the dead lock late in the game with Allan Cann sealing the win scoring under the posts winning the match for the Broncos 23-16.

In the grand final, again against the Dragons, the Broncos were victorious once more, this time 14-6. This win was significant because it was the only time a team which had finished 5th in the minor premiership had gone on to win the competition. It was Glenn Lazarus' fifth consecutive grand final appearance, having already played in the previous year's for Brisbane and the three years' before that for Canberra.

== Match results ==
Round	Opponent	Result	Bro.	Opp.	Date	Venue	Crowd	Position
1	Cronulla Sharks	Win	19	10	14 Mar	Endeavour Field	8,200	5/16
2	Canterbury Bulldogs	Loss	10	20	19 Mar	Carlaw Park	16,236	9/16
3	Parramatta Eels	Loss	8	12	28 Mar	ANZ Stadium	51,517	10/16
4	Canberra Raiders	Win	12	8	4 Apr	ANZ Stadium	46,001	9/16
5	Balmain Tigers	Win	12	6	10 Apr	Leichhardt Oval	7,522	8/16
6	Penrith Panthers	Win	34	8	18 Apr	ANZ Stadium	35,904	6/16
7	St George Dragons	Win	20	14	25 Apr	Kogarah Oval	17,025	6/16
8*	Illawarra Steelers	Win	24	22	9 May	ANZ Stadium	28,126	4/16
9*	North Sydney Bears	Loss	20	40	23 May	North Sydney Oval	20,378	5/16
10*	Wests Magpies	Win	36	16	6 June	ANZ Stadium	40,733	5/16
11	Easts Roosters	Win	26	22	12 Jun	Sydney Football Stadium	10,450	5/16
12	Gold Coast Seagulls	Win	14	6	18 Jun	ANZ Stadium	57,212	4/16
13	Manly Sea Eagles	Loss	8	24	26 Jun	Brookvale Oval	12,203	5/16
14	South Sydney Rabbitohs	Win	54	8	2 Jul	ANZ Stadium	31,896	5/16
15	Newcastle Knights	Win	31	2	11 Jul	Newcastle ISC	12,604	4/16
16	Cronulla Sharks	Win	38	34	18 Jul	ANZ Stadium	31,270	4/16
17	Canterbury Bulldogs	Win	38	18	25 Jul	ANZ Stadium	54,751	4/16
18	Parramatta Eels	Win	15	8	30 Jul	Parramatta Stadium	10,047	2/16
19	Canberra Raiders	Loss	4	20	6 Aug	Bruce Stadium	24,801	4/16
20	Balmain Tigers	Win	50	0	13 Aug	ANZ Stadium	39,193	3/16
21	Penrith Panthers	Win	34	14	21 Aug	Penrith Football Stadium	16,810	2/16
22	St George Dragons	Loss	10	16	27 Aug	ANZ Stadium	58,593	5/16
Prelim. Semi Final	Manly Sea Eagles	Win	36	10	5 Sep	Sydney Football Stadium	38,432	
Semi Final	Canberra Raiders	Win	30	12	11 Sep	Sydney Football Stadium	33,893	
Prelim. Final	Canterbury Bulldogs	Win	23	16	19 Sep	Sydney Football Stadium	34,821	
GRAND FINAL	St George Dragons	Win	14	6	26 Sep	Sydney Football Stadium	42,329	

*Game following a State of Origin match

== Scorers ==
Player	Tries	Goals	FG	Points
Terry Matterson	7	58/89	0	144
Julian O'Neill	9	28/41	3	95
Willie Carne	17	0	0	68
Steve Renouf	16	0	0	64
Michael Hancock	12	0	0	48
Allan Langer	11	0	1	45
Chris Johns	9	0	0	36
Alan Cann	6	0	0	24
Kevin Walters	6	0	0	24
Glenn Lazarus	3	0	0	12
John Plath	3	0	0	12
Wendell Sailor	3	0	0	12
Kerrod Walters	3	0	0	12
Peter Ryan	2	0	0	8
Trevor Gillmeister	1	0	0	4
Mark Hohn	1	0	0	4
Keiren Meyer	1	0	0	4
Brett Plowman	1	0	0	4

== Grand final ==
Team details
St. George Dragons		Position	Brisbane Broncos
Name	Number	Position	Number	Name
Mick Potter (c)	1	Fullback	1	Julian O'Neill
Ricky Walford	2	Wing	2	Michael Hancock
Mark Coyne	3	Centre	3	Steve Renouf
Graeme Bradley	4	Centre	4	Chris Johns
Ian Herron	5	Wing	5	Willie Carne
Tony Smith	6	Five eighth	6	Kevin Walters
Noel Goldthorpe	7	Half back	7	Allan Langer (c)
Tony Priddle	8	Prop forward	8	Glenn Lazarus
Wayne Collins	9	Hooker	9	Kerrod Walters
Jason Stevens	10	Prop forward	10	Mark Hohn
David Barnhill	11	Second row	11	Trevor Gillmeister
Scott Gourley	12	Second row	12	Alan Cann
Brad Mackay	13	Lock forward	13	Terry Matterson
Nathan Brown	22	Interchange	14	Andrew Gee
Gorden Tallis	24	Interchange	15	John Plath
Phil Blake	40	Interchange	16	Peter Ryan
Jeff Hardy	41	Interchange
Brian Smith		Coach		Wayne Bennett

1993 NSWRL Winfield Cup Grand Final

Sunday, 26 September
15:00 AEST (UTC+10)

St. George Dragons	6 – 14	Brisbane Broncos
Goals: 3 Herron pen 40', pen 48', pen 62' (3/3)	1st: 2–10; 2nd: 4–4	Tries: 3 Johns 21'; Matterson 30'; Carne 68'; Goals: 1 O'Neill 23' (1/3)

Sydney Football Stadium, Sydney
Attendance: 42,329
Referee: Greg McCallum
Clive Churchill Medal: Brad Mackay (St George)

== Honours ==
=== League ===
- Winfield Cup Premiership

=== Club ===
- Player of the year: Allan Langer
- Rookie of the year: Wendell Sailor
- Back of the year: Willie Carne
- Forward of the year: Kerrod Walters
- Club man of the year: Chris Johns
