= 1997 Brisbane Broncos season =

Coordinates: 27.558333°S 153.062222°E

- Super League (Australia) rank: 1st
- Play-off result: Premiers
- World Club Challenge: Champions
- 1997 record: Wins: 23; draws: 1; losses: 3
- Points scored: For: 481; against: 283

Team information
- Coach: Wayne Bennett
- Captain: Allan Langer
- Stadium: ANZ Stadium
- Avg. attendance: 19,298
- High attendance: 42,361 (Round 1)

Top scorers
- Tries: Steve Renouf (27)
- Goals: Darren Lockyer (105)
- Points: Darren Lockyer (254)
← 1996	1998 →

The 1997 Brisbane Broncos season was the tenth in the history of the Brisbane Broncos club. This season was unique in that they participated in the Australian Super League's 1997 Telstra Cup premiership and 1997 World Club Championship, winning both competitions.

== Season summary ==
The Broncos again won their first seven matches, before finally losing to the Penrith Panthers in round 8. Brisbane won their final three regular season games to capture their second minor premiership. In the major semi-final against Cronulla the Broncos thrashed the Sharks to move into the Super League Grand Final to be played at their home venue, ANZ Stadium. The Sharks recovered to make the big one, but they were no match for the Broncos. Despite being without key forward Glenn Lazarus and hampered by a troublesome groin injury, Allan Langer led his side to victory 26–8 for their third premiership in front of almost 60,000 home fans. Steve Renouf scored a hat-trick in the match.

Following the premiership win, the Broncos also won the 1997 World Club Championship which involved clubs from the Super League as well.

== Match results ==
Round	Opponent	Result	Bro.	Opp.	Date	Venue	Crowd	Position
1	Auckland Warriors	Win	14	2	1 Mar	ANZ Stadium	42,361	2/10
2	Adelaide Rams	Win	28	12	9 Mar	ANZ Stadium	16,279	1/10
3	Perth Reds	Win	26	16	16 Mar	WACA Ground	11,109	2/10
4	Canberra Raiders	Win	24	8	24 Mar	ANZ Stadium	26,103	2/10
5	Cronulla Sharks	Win	14	12	31 Mar	ANZ Stadium	17,294	1/10
6	North Queensland Cowboys	Win	42	16	5 Apr	Stockland Stadium	30,122	1/10
7	Adelaide Rams	Win	20	10	13 Apr	Adelaide Oval	17,633	1/10
8	Penrith Panthers	Loss	26	27	21 Apr	Penrith Football Stadium	12,648	1/10
9	Canterbury Bulldogs	Win	34	16	28 Apr	ANZ Stadium	17,921	1/10
10	Auckland Warriors	Win	34	18	4 May	Mt Smart Stadium	16,471	1/10
11	North Queensland Cowboys	Draw	20	20	25 May	ANZ Stadium	14,167	1/10
12	Hunter Mariners	Loss	6	24	30 May	Topper Stadium	7,124	1/10
13	Cronulla Sharks	Loss	4	32	30 Jun	Endeavour Field	12,240	1/10
14	Perth Reds	Win	50	14	6 Jul	ANZ Stadium	11,806	1/10
15	Canberra Raiders	Win	19	4	14 Jul	Bruce Stadium	13,067	1/10
16	Penrith Panthers	Win	54	12	10 Aug	ANZ Stadium	13,921	1/10
17	Hunter Mariners	Win	34	16	18 Aug	ANZ Stadium	13,830	1/10
18	Canterbury Bulldogs	Win	32	24	25 Aug	Belmore Oval	9,781	1/10
Semi Final	Cronulla Sharks	Win	34	2	6 Sep	Stockland Stadium	26,256	
GRAND FINAL	Cronulla Sharks	Win	26	8	20 Sep	ANZ Stadium	58,912	

== World Club Challenges Match results ==
Round	Opponent	Result	Bro.	Opp.	Date	Venue	Crowd
WCC 1	London Broncos	Win	42	22	6 Jun	ANZ Stadium	18,193
WCC 2	Wigan Warriors	Win	34	0	16 Jun	ANZ Stadium	14,833
WCC 3	Halifax Blue Sox	Win	76	0	24 Jun	ANZ Stadium	11,358
WCC 4	Wigan Warriors	Win	30	4	20 Jul	Central Park	12,816
WCC 5	London Broncos	Win	34	16	27 Jul	The Stoop	9,846
WCC 6	Halifax Blue Sox	Win	54	10	4 Aug	Thrum Hall	3,255
WCC Quarter Final	St. Helens	Win	66	12	4 Oct	ANZ Stadium	6,438
WCC Semi Final	Auckland Warriors	Win	22	16	10 Oct	ANZ Stadium	9,686
WCC Final	Hunter Mariners	Win	36	12	17 Oct	Mt Smart Stadium	12,000

== Ladders ==
=== Telstra Cup Premiership Ladder ===
Pos	Team	Pld	W	D	L	PF	PA	PD	Pts
1	Brisbane Broncos (P)	18	14	1	3	481	283	+198	29
2	Cronulla Sharks	18	12	0	6	403	230	+173	24
3	Canberra Raiders	18	11	0	7	436	337	+99	22
4	Canterbury Bulldogs	18	10	0	8	453	447	+6	20
5	Penrith Panthers	18	9	0	9	431	462	-31	18
6	Hunter Mariners	18	7	0	11	350	363	-13	14
7	Auckland Warriors	18	7	0	11	332	406	-74	14
8	Perth Reds	18	7	0	11	321	456	-135	14
9	Adelaide Rams	18	6	1	11	303	402	-99	13
10	North Queensland Cowboys	18	5	2	11	328	452	-124	12

- (P) - Premiers

=== World Club Challenge Australasia Pool A ===
	Team	Pld	W	L	D	PF	PA	PD	Pts
1	Brisbane	6	6	0	0	270	52	+218	12
2	Auckland	6	6	0	0	268	82	+186	12
3	Cronulla	6	6	0	0	230	54	+176	12
4	Penrith	6	6	0	0	256	120	+136	12
5	Canberra	6	5	1	0	302	108	+194	10
6	Canterbury	6	4	2	0	218	121	+97	8

== Scorers ==
Player	Tries	Goals	FG	Points
Darren Lockyer	7	70/109	0	168
Wendell Sailor	15	0	0	60
Steve Renouf	14	0	0	56
Michael De Vere	7	2/2	0	32
Darren Smith	8	0	0	32
Kevin Walters	8	0	0	32
Tonie Carroll	6	0	0	24
Peter Ryan	6	0	0	24
Brett Le Man	4	0	0	16
Allan Langer	5	0	1	21
Michael Hancock	5	0	0	20
Brad Thorn	4	0	0	16
Anthony Mundine	3	0	0	12
John Plath	3	0	0	12
Gorden Tallis	3	0	0	12
Shane Webcke	3	0	0	12
Andrew Gee	1	0	0	4
Phillip Lee	1	0	0	4

== Grand final ==
1997 Super League Telstra Cup Grand Final

Saturday, 20 September
20:00 AEST (UTC+10)

Brisbane	26 – 8	Cronulla
Tries: 4 Renouf 34', 55', 65'; Hancock 79'; Goals: 5 Lockyer pen 8', pen 25', 35', 56', 80' (5/6)	1st: 10–2; 2nd: 16–6; Report	Tries: 1 Richardson 45'; Goals: 2 Rogers pen 22', 46' (2/2)

Queensland Sport & Athletics Centre, Brisbane
Attendance: 58,912
Referee: Bill Harrigan (Australia)
Player of the Match: Steve Renouf (Brisbane)

Team details
Brisbane Broncos		Position	Cronulla Sharks
Name	Number	Position	Number	Name
Darren Lockyer	1	FB	21	David Peachey
Michael De Vere	18	WG	45	Mat Rogers
Steve Renouf	3	CE	3	Andrew Ettingshausen (c)
Anthony Mundine	4	CE	33	Russell Richardson
Wendell Sailor	5	WG	17	Geoff Bell
Kevin Walters	6	FE	6	Mitch Healey
Allan Langer (c)	7	HB	7	Paul Green
Brad Thorn	10	PR	8	Danny Lee
Andrew Gee	23	HK	9	Dean Treister
Shane Webcke	21	PF	40	Jason Stevens
Gorden Tallis	11	SR	11	Craig Greenhill
Peter Ryan	12	SR	31	Chris McKenna
Darren Smith	13	LK	13	Tawera Nikau
Tonie Carroll	15	IN	18	Adam Dykes
John Plath	9	IN	24	Sean Ryan
Michael Hancock	2	IN	38	Les Davidson
Ben Walker	16	IN	12	Nathan Long
Wayne Bennett		Coach		John Lang
RLP

== Honours ==
=== League ===
- Nil

=== Club ===
- Player of the year: Peter Ryan
- Rookie of the year: Michael De Vere
- Back of the year: Kevin Walters
- Forward of the year: Brad Thorn
- Club man of the year: Tony Spencer
