= Trevor Gillmeister =

Australia international rugby league footballer

Trevor 'The Axe' Gillmeister
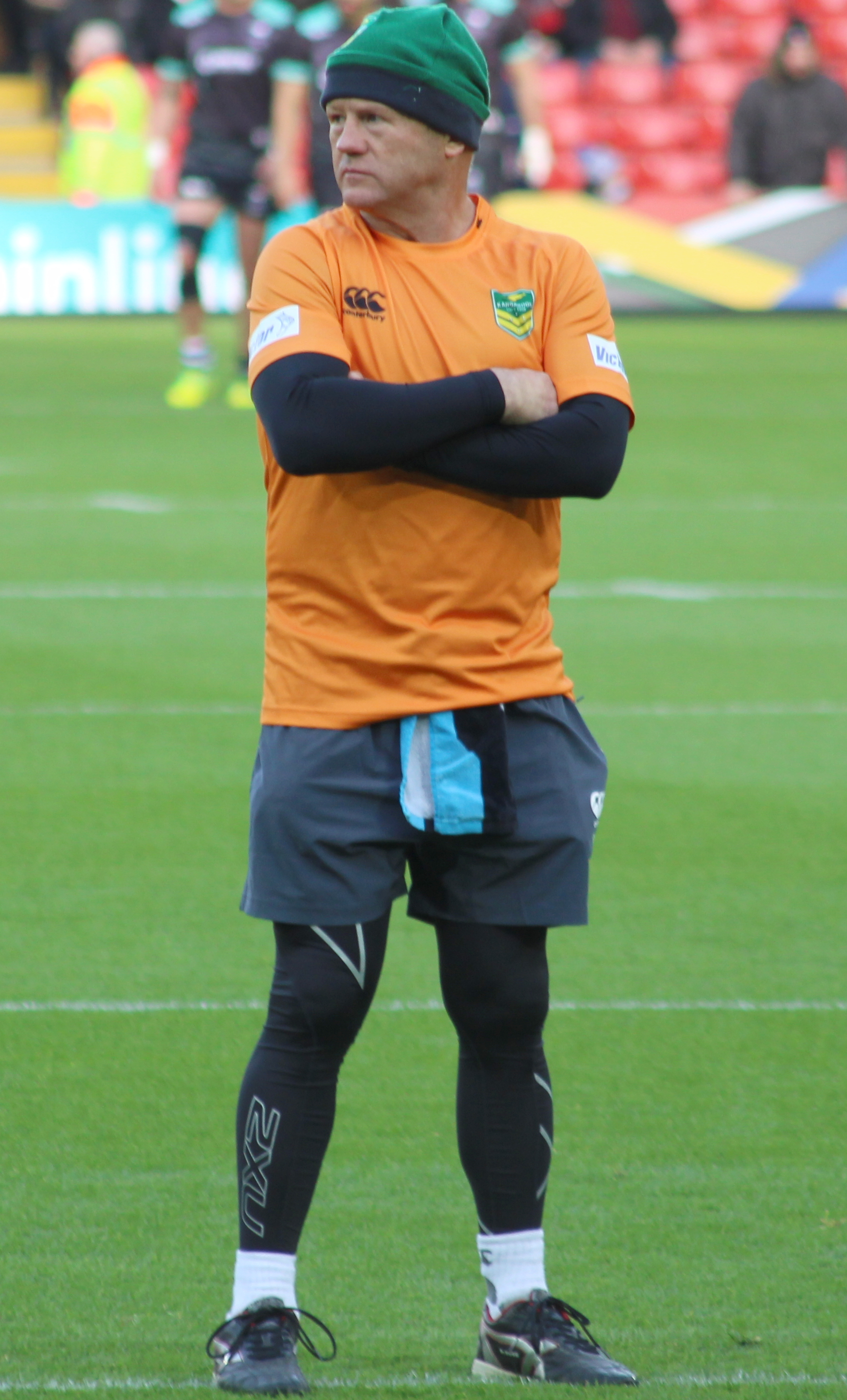

Personal information
- Full name: Trevor Gillmeister
- Born: 13 March 1964 (age 62) Brisbane, Queensland, Australila

Playing information
- Height: 178 cm (5 ft 10 in)
- Weight: 89 kg (14 st 0 lb)
- Position: Second-row, Prop, Hooker, Lock
Club
Years	Team	Pld	T	G	FG	P
1983–85	Northern Suburbs	24	3	0	0	12
1986–90	Eastern Suburbs	98	9	0	0	36
1991–93	Brisbane Broncos	72	8	0	0	32
1994	Penrith Panthers	22	1	0	0	4
1995–96	South Qld Crushers	41	3	0	0	12
	Total	257	24	0	0	96
Representative
Years	Team	Pld	T	G	FG	P
1987–96	Queensland	22	0	0	0	0
1995	Australia	3	0	0	0	0

Coaching information
Representative
Years	Team	Gms	W	D	L	W%
2006	Queensland Residents	1	0	0	1	0

Trevor Gillmeister (born 13 March 1964) is an Australian former professional rugby league footballer who is employed as a rugby league analyst at Channel 7 Brisbane. During his playing days, Gillmeister played for the Eastern Suburbs Roosters, Brisbane Broncos, Penrith Panthers and the South Queensland Crushers, as well as representing Queensland and Australia.

He played mostly in the second row, though he also spent time at prop, hooker and lock. Gillmeister was known as The Axe to fans of the game because of his punishing tackles. "The Axe" was also the name of the column he wrote for The Sunday Mail in Brisbane.

Today, Gillmeister works as the Asbestos Awareness Ambassador for the Queensland Government and works alongside Accent Benchtops. He has also been the Queensland Maroons' defensive coach since 2006.

== Background ==
Gillmeister was born in Brisbane, Queensland, Australila. Growing up, Gillmeister played football with the Gladstone club in central Queensland.

== Playing career ==
Gillmeister's first-grade debut in the Brisbane Rugby League premiership came in Round 5 of the 1983 season for Northern Suburbs at nineteen years of age.

=== Eastern Suburbs ===
In 1986, Gillmeister moved to Sydney, joining the Arthur Beetson-coached Eastern Suburbs Roosters. Early on in his career, he forged a reputation for being a tough, fearless and hard-hitting tackler, earning him the nickname 'The Axe'. After spending five years at the Roosters, Gillmeister signed a two-year deal with his hometown club, the Brisbane Broncos.

=== Brisbane Broncos ===
In 1991, his first year at the Broncos, he won the club's player of the year award. The following season, Gillmeister put in an impressive defensive display in the club's 28-8 grand final victory over the St. George Dragons. In the weeks following the grand final, Gillmeister travelled with the Broncos to Wigan in England, where he played in the 1992 World Club Challenge final against British champions Wigan at their famous ground, Central Park. In this game, he helped the Broncos become the first Australian club to win the World Club Challenge in Britain, with a 22–8 win in front of 17,764 fans.

In 1993, Gillmeister again helped the Broncos to a 14-6 grand final win against their same opponents from the previous year's decider, the St. George Dragons. Prior to the 1993 grand final victory, the Broncos announced that they could not re-sign Gillmeister due to salary cap restrictions, prompting him to move on to the Penrith Panthers after playing 72 games for Brisbane and scoring eight tries for a total of 32 points.

=== Penrith Panthers ===
The Penrith Panthers, coached by Phil Gould, quickly signed Gillmeister after he was not offered a contract by the Broncos. His return to Sydney, however, was a brief one, only making 22 appearances for the club and scoring one try in 1994. He was released from the second year of his contract to sign for the newly formed second Brisbane-based team, the South Queensland Crushers.

=== South Queensland Crushers ===
To start the 1995 ARL season, Gillmeister had the honour of scoring the club's first-ever try in its season-opening 24–6 loss at Suncorp Stadium against the Canberra Raiders. In 1995, he became the first and only ever South Queensland Crushers player to be selected for Australia. At the end of 1996, Gillmeister decided to retire from playing rugby league. In his time as a player, Gillmeister named his most-respected opponents as NSW Origin forwards David "Cement" Gillespie (Canterbury, Wests and Manly) and Les Davidson (Souths and Cronulla)

== Representative career ==
=== Queensland ===
Gillmeister made his State of Origin debut playing in the second row for Queensland in Game 1 of the 1987 Origin series in front of an overflow crowd of 33,411 at Brisbane's Lang Park. He would go on to make 22 State of Origin appearances for Queensland between 1987 and 1996, captaining the Queensland team to an improbable 3–0 series victory in 1995 under the coaching of his former Queensland and Eastern Suburbs teammate, Paul Vautin. Gillmeister battled a blood disorder prior to the third and final match of the series in Melbourne and, after taking the field to lead Queensland to victory, Gillmeister was rushed back to hospital to be treated again. In 1996, he captained Queensland in the first State of Origin match of the series but Gillmeister was dropped from the team after the game and was never selected to represent Queensland again.

At State of Origin level, Gillmeister defied his stature by continually hurting the Blues' forwards with stinging defence throughout his career. In particular, he is remembered for his ongoing fiery attacking and defensive clashes with New South Wales hardman Paul Harragon.

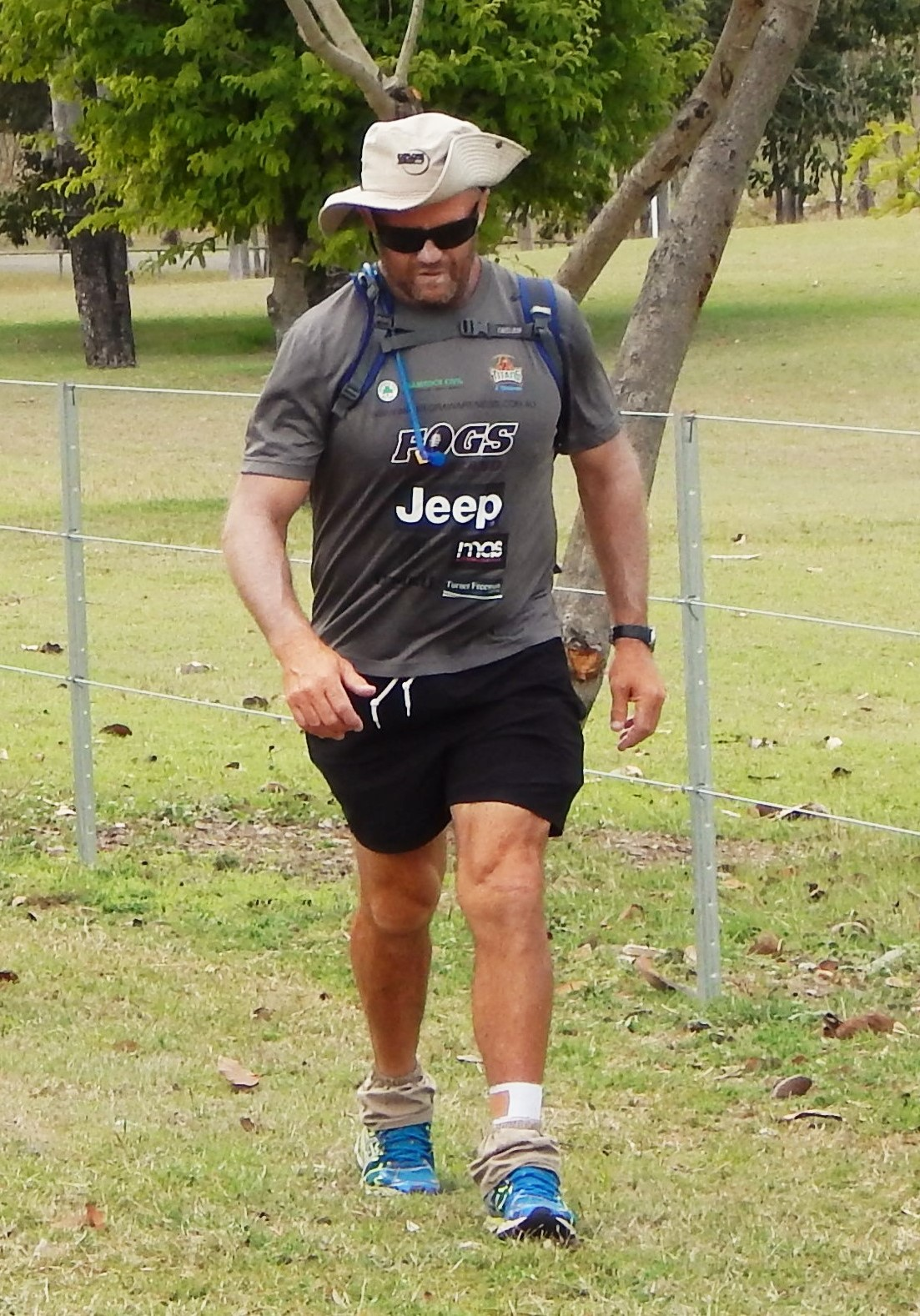
Gillmeister during his "Taking an Axe to Asbestos" walk in 2014.

=== Australia ===
In 1995, after nearly ten years in the New South Wales Rugby League, including two grand final victories with the Broncos, and 21 State of Origin games for Queensland, Gillmeister made his Australian debut when he was selected as a reserve forward for the first Trans-Tasman Test match against New Zealand at Suncorp Stadium. At 31 years of age, he became the oldest ever forward to make his international debut. Gillmeister played all three Tests against the Kiwis from the bench as the Australians, minus the Super League-aligned players, won the series 3–0. Despite good performances throughout the remainder of the 1995 season, Gillmeister missed out on a place in Australia's World Cup winning team at the end of the year, leaving his three Tests against New Zealand as the only time he was selected to represent his country.

In 2000, Gillmeister was awarded the Australian Sports Medal for his contribution to Australia's international standing in the sport of rugby league.

== Coaching career ==
Gillmeister has worked as assistant coach for the Queensland State of Origin team. In 2006 it was announced that he had been signed as an assistant coach by the newly formed Gold Coast Titans, who were to enter the NRL competition at the start of the 2007 season. Upon his signing at the club, Gillmeister commented, "It's a thrill and honour to be part of a brand new organisation. It's also a huge challenge but something I'm looking forward to."

In 2008, Gillmeister was named at second-row in an all-time greatest Norths Devils team.

== Charity ==
Following the death of his father Ron from mesothelioma in 2009, which he contracted while working in Gladstone in the 1970s, Gillmeister became an ambassador for the Asbestos Related Disease Support Society Queensland.

In 2014, Gillmeister held the "Taking an Axe to Asbestos" fundraising walk. Beginning in Townsville on 26 September 2014, Gillmeister walked down the Queensland coast, reaching Brisbane on 27 October 2014.

During the walk, Gillmeister collected donations for the organisation while raising awareness of asbestos-related diseases.

== Personal life ==
In November 2025, it was revealed that Gillmeister had been arrested by Queensland police and was charged with one count each of public nuisance, assault and obstructing police after an incident at a Brisbane pub. In December, Gillmeister was handed a Good behaviour bond and fined over the incident.
