= 1998 Brisbane Broncos season =

Coordinates: 27.558333°S 153.062222°E

- 1998 NRL premiers
- NRL Rank: 1st
- Play-off result: Premiers
- 1998 record: Wins: 18; draws: 1; losses: 5
- Points scored: For: 688; against: 310

Team information
- Coach: Wayne Bennett
- Captain: Allan Langer
- Stadium: ANZ Stadium
- Avg. attendance: 20,073 (Note: Regular season home matches in Brisbane only)
- High attendance: 39,109 (Round 1) (Note: Regular season home matches in Brisbane only)

Top scorers
- Tries: Darren Smith (23)
- Goals: Darren Lockyer (98)
- Points: Darren Lockyer (272)
← 1997	1999 →

The 1998 Brisbane Broncos season was the eleventh in the history of Brisbane's National Rugby League premiership team, the Brisbane Broncos. Coached by Wayne Bennett and captained by Allan Langer, they participated in the newly formed National Rugby League's 1998 premiership and posted their three biggest ever wins in rounds 5, 7 and 15 before finishing the regular season as minor premiers. The Broncos then won the 1998 NRL Grand Final, capturing their fourth premiership in seven seasons.

== Season summary ==
For the 1998 season the Broncos were joined by future Melbourne Storm coach, Craig Bellamy who would work under head coach Wayne Bennett as performance co-ordinator and assistant coach.

As could be expected by their finish to the 1997 season, Brisbane were solid in their first five matches of 1998, snatching five victories. In rounds five and seven, the Broncos won by a margin of 54 points, which was the club's record at the time. This was followed by shock losses to the Sydney City Roosters and Cronulla, but Langer led them to a big win over Canterbury only to see two more club losses. But the Broncos recovered to post huge wins over Penrith and the Western Suburbs Magpies. The Broncos finished the remainder of the regular season undefeated finishing with 10 wins and 1 draw in their last 11 games. The top try-scorer from the NRL season was Brisbane's Darren Smith.

After a week off granted by winning the minor premiership, the Broncos were smothered out of the game by Parramatta 15–10 in their opening finals match. But they lifted and provided some miracle spark against the Melbourne Storm 30-6 a week later, resurrecting their premiership hopes. A huge win over Sydney City 46–18 in the preliminary final installed them at near unbackable odds against Canterbury in the first NRL Grand Final. The Broncos came back from a 12-10 half time deficit to again win consecutive premierships for the second time, and their fourth in seven seasons with a 38-12 Grand Final victory.

The Broncos were also named "Queensland Sport Team of the Year" at the Queensland Sport Awards.

The Broncos' consistent dominance over other teams at this period of time contributed to the National Rugby League's plans to cut the number of teams down to 14 in order to ensure competitiveness and the long-term financial success of the game. Despite the rationalization of the league, the club has continued to dominate in the modern era of the league, winning two more premierships in 2000 and 2006, as well as reaching another two Grand Finals in 2015 and 2023.

The Broncos' 1998 premiership win came in a year in which their Australian Football League neighbours, the Brisbane Lions, won the wooden spoon.

== Match results ==
Round	Opponent	Result	Bro.	Opp.	Date	Venue	Crowd	Position
1	Manly Sea Eagles	Win	22	6	13 Mar	ANZ Stadium	39,109	4/20
2	Canterbury Bulldogs	Win	20	12	22 Mar	Belmore Oval	10,962	3/20
3	Penrith Panthers	Win	26	18	28 Mar	ANZ Stadium	18,570	3/20
4	Gold Coast Chargers	Win	40	18	5 Apr	Carrara Stadium	13,126	2/20
5	North Queensland Cowboys	Win	58	4	12 Apr	ANZ Stadium	20,904	1/20
6	Manly Sea Eagles	Loss	4	28	17 Apr	Brookvale Oval	13,194	1/20
7	North Sydney Bears	Win	60	6	26 Apr	ANZ Stadium	18,791	1/20
8	Newcastle Knights	Win	26	6	1 May	Newcastle ISC	27,119	1/20
9	Sydney City Roosters	Loss	12	26	10 May	ANZ Stadium	19,346	1/20
10	Cronulla Sharks	Loss	10	20	16 May	Endeavour Field	10,582	5/20
11^	Canterbury Bulldogs	Win	40	12	24 May	ANZ Stadium	15,407	4/20
12	Canberra Raiders	Loss	18	24	31 May	Bruce Stadium	14,728	5/20
13^	Parramatta Eels	Loss	16	20	7 Jun	ANZ Stadium	18,163	6/20
14	Penrith Panthers	Win	44	4	13 Jun	Penrith Football Stadium	11,637	6/20
15^	Western Suburbs Magpies	Win	56	4	21 Jun	ANZ Stadium	12,415	5/20
16	St George Dragons	Win	30	18	26 Jun	Kogarah Oval	16,258	4/20
17	Melbourne Storm	Win	34	16	3 Jul	ANZ Stadium	35,119	3/20
18	Illawarra Steelers	Win	18	12	12 Jul	WIN Stadium	12,018	3/20
19	Gold Coast Chargers	Win	44	10	19 Jul	ANZ Stadium	12,740	2/20
20	Balmain Tigers	Draw	10	10	25 Jul	Leichhardt Oval	7,159	2/20
21	Adelaide Rams	Win	46	12	1 Aug	ANZ Stadium	13,858	1/20
22	North Queensland Cowboys	Win	22	10	8 Aug	Stockland Stadium	30,250	1/20
23	Auckland Warriors	Win	16	4	16 Aug	ANZ Stadium	16,456	1/20
24	South Sydney Rabbitohs	Win	16	10	23 Aug	Sydney Football Stadium	7,262	1/20
Qualif. Final	Parramatta Eels	Loss	10	15	6 Sep	ANZ Stadium	21,172	
Semi Final	Melbourne Storm	Win	30	6	13 Sep	Sydney Football Stadium	20,354	
Prelim. Final	Sydney City Roosters	Win	46	18	19 Sep	ANZ Stadium	28,374	
GRAND FINAL	Canterbury Bulldogs	Win	38	12	27 Sep	Sydney Football Stadium	40,857	

^Game following a State of Origin match

Brisbane Broncos NRL average home attendance in 1998: 20,073

== Ladder ==
1998 NRL season
Pos	Team	Pld	W	D	L	PF	PA	PD	Pts
1	Brisbane Broncos (P)	24	18	1	5	688	310	+378	37
2	Newcastle Knights	24	18	1	5	562	381	+181	37
3	Melbourne Storm	24	17	1	6	546	372	+174	35
4	Parramatta Eels	24	17	1	6	468	349	+119	35
5	North Sydney Bears	24	17	0	7	663	367	+296	34
6	Sydney City Roosters	24	16	0	8	680	383	+297	32
7	Canberra Raiders	24	15	0	9	564	429	+135	30
8	St. George Dragons	24	13	1	10	486	490	−4	27
9	Canterbury-Bankstown Bulldogs	24	13	0	11	489	411	+78	26
10	Manly Warringah Sea Eagles	24	13	0	11	503	473	+30	26
11	Cronulla-Sutherland Sharks	24	12	1	11	438	387	+51	25
12	Illawarra Steelers	24	11	1	12	476	539	−63	23
13	Balmain Tigers	24	9	1	14	381	463	−82	19
14	Penrith Panthers	24	8	2	14	525	580	−55	18
15	Auckland Warriors	24	9	0	15	417	518	−101	18
16	North Queensland Cowboys	24	9	0	15	361	556	−195	18
17	Adelaide Rams	24	7	0	17	393	615	−222	14
18	South Sydney Rabbitohs	24	5	0	19	339	560	−221	10
19	Gold Coast Chargers	24	4	0	20	289	654	−365	8
20	Western Suburbs Magpies	24	4	0	20	371	802	−431	8

(P) Premiers

== Grand final ==
Brisbane Broncos vs. Canterbury Bulldogs

Player	Position	Player
Darren Lockyer	Fullback	Rod Silva
Michael De Vere	Wing	Gavin Lester
Steve Renouf	Centre	Shane Marteene
Darren Smith	Centre	Willie Talau
Wendell Sailor	Wing	Daryl Halligan
Kevin Walters	Five-eighth	Craig Polla-Mounter
Allan Langer (C)	Halfback	Corey Hughes
Shane Webcke	Prop	Darren Britt (C)
Phillip Lee	Hooker	Jason Hetherington
Andrew Gee	Prop	Steve Price
Gorden Tallis	Second Row	Tony Grimaldi
Brad Thorn	Second Row	Robert Relf
Tonie Carroll	Lock	Travis Norton
Michael Hancock	Interchange	Steve Reardon
John Plath	Interchange	Troy Stone
Kevin Campion	Interchange	Glen Hughes
Petero Civoniceva	Interchange	David Thompson
Wayne Bennett	Coach	Steve Folkes

1998 NRL Grand Final

Sunday, 27 September
15:00 AEST (UTC+10)

Brisbane Broncos	38 – 12	Canterbury-Bankstown Bulldogs
Tries: 7 De Vere 2'; Campion 27'; Carroll 41'; Sailor 50'; Tallis 59'; Lee 68'; Smith 75'; Goals: 5 Lockyer 4', 43', 60', 69', 76' (5/7)	1st: 10–12; 2nd: 28–0; Report	Tries: 2 Grimaldi 21'; Talau 30'; Goals: 2 Halligan pen 11', 22' (2/3)

Sydney Football Stadium, Sydney
Attendance: 40,857
Referee: Bill Harrigan
Touch judges: Steve Betts, John McCormack
Clive Churchill Medal: Gorden Tallis (Brisbane)

== Scorers ==
Player	Tries	Goals	FG	Points
Darren Lockyer	19	98/144	0	272
Darren Smith	23	0	0	92
Steve Renouf	20	0	0	80
Wendell Sailor	18	0	0	72
Michael De Vere	8	9/13	0	50
Michael Hancock	10	0	0	40
Allan Langer	10	0	0	40
Gorden Tallis	8	0	0	32
Kevin Campion	6	0	0	24
Phillip Lee	6	0	0	24
Ben Walker	4	1/2	0	18
Tonie Carroll	4	0	0	16
Andrew Gee	4	0	0	16
Kevin Walters	4	0	0	16
Petero Civoniceva	1	0	0	4
John Plath	1	0	0	4
Peter Ryan	1	0	0	4
Brad Thorn	1	0	0	4
Shane Webcke	1	0	0	4

== Honours ==
=== League ===
- Premiership
- Minor premiership

=== Club ===
- Player of the year: Andrew Gee
- Rookie of the year: Petero Civoniceva
- Back of the year: Kevin Walters
- Forward of the year: Shane Webcke
- Club man of the year: Brett Green
