= Alan Cann =

Australian rugby league footballer

Personal information
- Born: 11 March 1971 (age 55)

Playing information
- Height: 172 cm (5 ft 8 in)
- Weight: 96 kg (15 st 2 lb)
- Position: Second-row
Club
Years	Team	Pld	T	G	FG	P
1990–96	Brisbane Broncos	100	16	0	0	64
1997–98	Adelaide Rams	32	1	0	0	4
	Total	132	17	0	0	68
Representative
Years	Team	Pld	T	G	FG	P
1996	Queensland	1	0	0	0	0

Alan Cann is an Australian former professional rugby league footballer who played in the 1990s. A Queensland State of Origin representative forward, he played club football mostly with the Brisbane Broncos, with whom he won consecutive grand finals in 1992 and 1993, and also with the Adelaide Rams.

== Early life ==
While attending Beenleigh State High School, Cann was an Australian schoolboys rugby league representative in 1987.

== Playing career ==
=== Brisbane Broncos ===
Cann played for Logan City before graduating from the Brisbane Colts to the Broncos' NSWRL first-grade team in 1990.

After playing eight games for the Broncos in his debut season, and seven more the following year, 1992 proved to be a breakthrough season for Cann. During 1992, he held down a regular spot in the side's starting line-up and survived two spear-tackling controversies, one in the pre-season competition in a game against Western Suburbs and the other on Penrith's Brad Fittler in Round 4 of the premiership, along with a high tackle on Cronulla's Mark McGaw in Round 1, to play a pivotal role in Brisbane's inaugural premiership success. He scored two tries in the 28-8 grand final win over St George but missed the Broncos' World Club Challenge win in England the following month because of injury.

After winning another premiership with the Broncos in 1993, Cann was again involved in a contentious tackle in the club's loss to Wigan in the 1994 World Club Challenge at ANZ Stadium the following year. During the game, Cann appeared to spear-tackle Wigan winger Martin Offiah, but the hastily organised international disciplinary tribunal determined that he did not have a case to answer, despite video evidence clearly suggesting otherwise. After making an appearance for the Queensland Maroons in the 1996 State of Origin series, Cann suffered a serious knee injury in a Round 12 match against Illawarra which required major reconstructive surgery. This ruled him out for rest of the season and he was subsequently cut from his club's playing roster at the end of the year.

=== Adelaide Rams ===
Cann, along with Brisbane teammate Kerrod Walters, joined Super League club the Adelaide Rams after both were released by the Broncos at the conclusion of the 1996 ARL season. He spent the 1997 and 1998 seasons there before retiring at the age of 27.
