= 1994 World Club Challenge =

Intercontinental rugby tournament

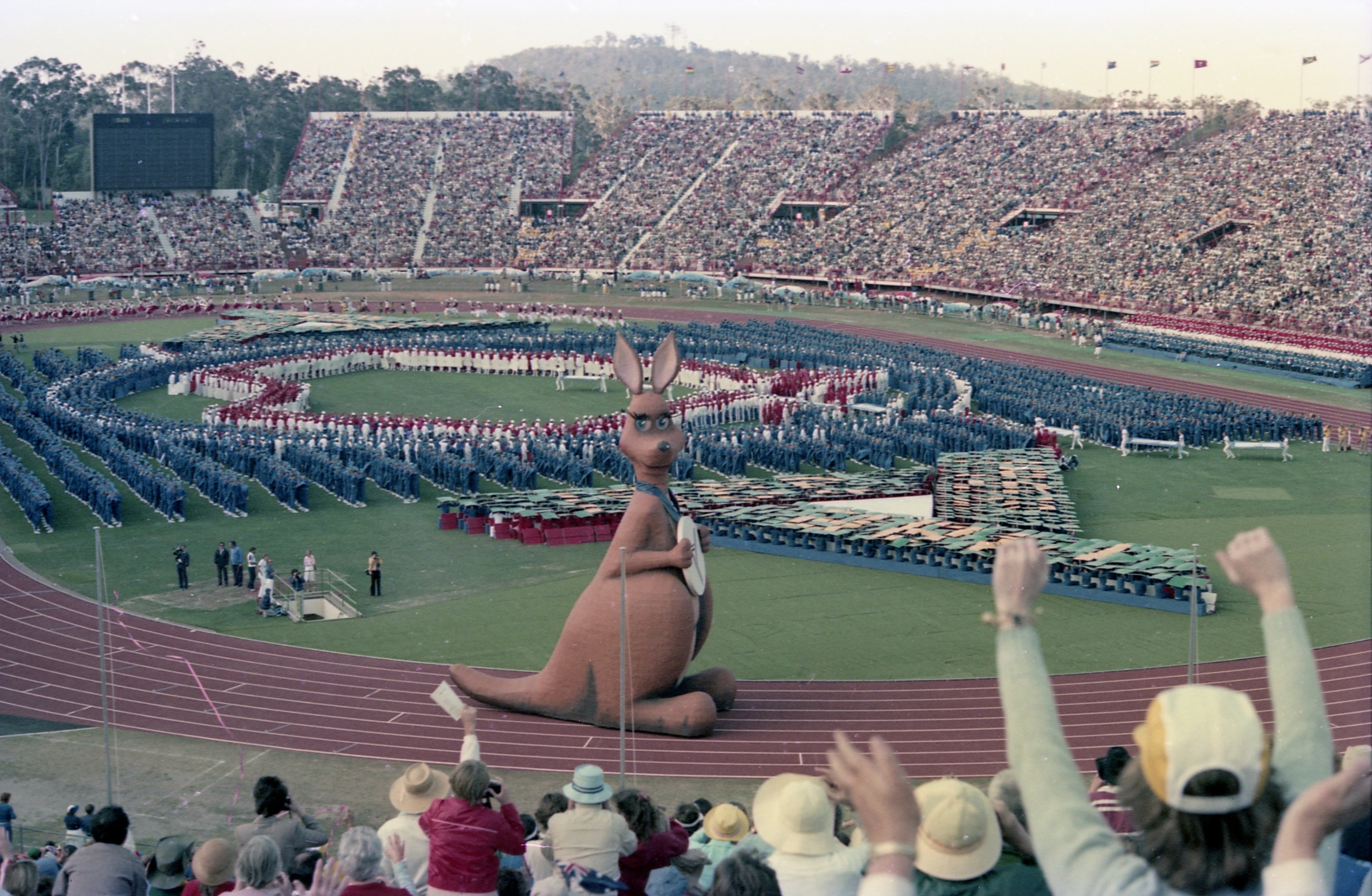
- ANZ Stadium hosted the match
Brisbane Broncos	Wigan
(NSWRL ( (Australia) ))	(RFL ( (United Kingdom) ))
14	20
	1	2	Total
BRI	4	10	14
WIG	12	8	20
- Date: 1 June 1994
- Stadium: ANZ Stadium
- Location: Brisbane, Australia
- Man of the Match: Shaun Edwards
- Referee: Greg McCallum (Australia)
- Attendance: 54,220

Broadcast partners
- Broadcasters: Nine Network (Australia); Sky Sports (United Kingdom)
- Commentators: Ray Warren (Nine); Peter Sterling (Nine); John Monie (Nine); Gary Belcher (Nine)

The 1994 MMI World Club Challenge was a replay of the 1992 World Club Challenge, with 1993–94 Rugby Football League season champions Wigan facing the 1993 NSWRL season premiers, the Brisbane Broncos, this time in Australia. Wigan were clearly the dominant club in the English game, having won the previous four consecutive Rugby Football League Championships and Challenge Cup tournaments. The Broncos, having won consecutive premierships in 1992 and 1993, were the dominant team in the Australian game at the time. In the World Club Challenge–this time played unusually late in the year–Wigan were looking to get revenge for their loss against Brisbane in the sides' previous encounter, and obtained a strong first-half lead. The English club then survived a second-half comeback from Brisbane and won the match, cementing their position as the world's dominant rugby league club of the period.

Television coverage was provided by Australia's Nine Network with the game shown live in Great Britain by Sky Sports. Commentary was provided by the Australian team of Ray Warren, Peter Sterling, Wigan's former coach John Monie with Gary Belcher the sideline reporter.”Wigan we’re good.”

== Background ==
=== Brisbane Broncos ===
The 1993 Brisbane Broncos season was the sixth in the club's history. Coached by Wayne Bennett and captained by Allan Langer, they competed in the NSWRL's 1993 Winfield Cup premiership, finishing the regular season 5th (out of 16) before going on to play in a re-match of the previous year's grand final against the St George Dragons and again win, claiming consecutive premierships. In doing so they also became the first team in history to win the premiership from fifth position.

=== Wigan RLFC ===
The 1993–94 Wigan season was the 98th in the club's history. Coached by John Dorahy and captained by Shaun Edwards, they competed in the 1993–94 Rugby Football League season, finishing the season at the top of the League to claim the Championship for the fifth consecutive season.

== Teams ==
Brisbane Broncos	Wigan

FB	5	Willie Carne
LW	2	Michael Hancock
CE	3	Steve Renouf
CE	4	Chris Johns
RW	1	Wendell Sailor
FE	6	Kevin Walters
HB	7	Allan Langer (c)
PR	8	Glenn Lazarus
HK	9	Kerrod Walters
PR	10	Andrew Gee
SR	11	Mark Hohn
SR	12	Alan Cann
LK	13	Julian O'Neill
Substitutions:
IC	14	John Plath
IC	15	Peter Ryan
IC	16	Brett Galea
IC	17	Chris McKenna
Coach:
(Australia) Wayne Bennett

FB	1	Gary Connolly
RW	2	Jason Robinson
CE	3	Sam Panapa
CE	4	Barrie-Jon Mather
LW	5	Martin Offiah
SO	6	Frano Botica
SH	7	Shaun Edwards (c)
PR	8	Neil Cowie
HK	9	Martin Dermott
PR	10	Billy McGinty
SR	11	Denis Betts
SR	12	Andy Farrell
LF	13	Phil Clarke
Substitutions:
IC	14	Va'aiga Tuigamala
IC	15	Martin Hall
IC	16	Mick Cassidy
IC	17	Paul Atcheson
Coach:
(New Zealand) Graeme West

== Match details ==
The match was played at Brisbane's ANZ Stadium on 1 June, in the middle of the 1994 NSWRL season. A crowd of 54,220, which set the record attendance for a World Club Challenge (which still stands as of 2017), turned out for the game, which was refereed by Greg McCallum. Wigan's chances didn't look good against a star-studded Broncos side because both of their first-choice test props, Kelvin Skerrett (broken jaw) and Andy Platt had been ruled out as injured. In addition their coach John Dorahy had been sacked just weeks previously, so they went into the match under a caretaker coach: former Wigan captain and New Zealand international Graeme West.

With the Broncos not being the dominant force they had been in the previous two seasons (though still going well enough to be a top-five team in the NSWRL premiership at that stage), Brisbane coach Wayne Bennett experimented with his lineup somewhat for the game. Although named at fullback and wing respectively, Wendell Sailor and Willie Carne swapped positions with Sailor going to the wing and Carne to fullback. Also, back rower Peter Ryan was moved to the bench with regular fullback Julian O'Neill moving to the unfamiliar position of lock forward to allow for the changes at fullback and wing.

Wednesday 1 June

Brisbane Broncos	14 – 20	Wigan
Tries: Wendell Sailor; Michael Hancock; Julian O'Neill; Goals: Julian O'Neill (1/3)		Tries: Denis Betts; Barrie-Jon Mather; Jason Robinson; Goals: Frano Botica (4/4)

ANZ Stadium, Brisbane
Attendance: 54,220
Referee: Greg McCallum (Australia)
Player of the Match: Shaun Edwards

=== First half ===
The match was played under international rules, meaning that when a player was substituted he could not return. Brisbane suffered early from this with the loss of five-eighth Kevin Walters in the fifth minute with an ankle injury. Wigan then opened the scoring in the seventh minute, when Denis Betts pounced on a high ball from Shaun Edwards and ran in for a try. The British champions added to this with another try in the sixteenth minute from Barrie-Jon Mather, bringing the unlikely score of 12–0 in favour of the visitors. In the twenty-seventh minute, Wendell Sailor opened the scoring for Brisbane when he beat Martin Offiah on the wing to put the ball down in the corner. The failed conversion meant a half-time lead for Wigan of 12–4.

The first 20 minutes saw a number of on-field positional changes for the Broncos. With Walters off injured, John Plath came on with Julian O'Neill moved to five-eighth. Also, after originally starting with Willie Carne at fullback and Wendell Sailor on the wing, the two swapped positions following the Denis Betts try, while after Mather's try O'Neill dropped back to fullback when the Broncos were defending with Sailor moving into the front line.

=== Second half ===
Just three minutes into the second half, a defining moment in the game took place when Michael Hancock knocked on and Jason Robinson picked up the ball and sped away, beating Sailor to score Wigan's third try. Frano Botica made it three from three with the boot when he kicked the conversion, bringing the score to 18–4. Brisbane staged a comeback, with Hancock making amends for his knock-on with a try on forty-six minutes and Julian O'Neill getting a try on fifty-nine minutes. Wigan's lead was reduced to four points, but their defence kept the Broncos out for the remainder of the game. A sixty-sixth-minute penalty by Botica meant a perfect night with the boot for him and a final score of 14–20.

=== Post-match ===
Wigan's captain Shaun Edwards was named man-of-the-match and his team reclaimed the WCC trophy, going home with the $400,000 of prize money. With the Super League war looming, this was to be the last WCC match until the 1997 World Club Championship which included all Super League-aligned clubs from the European competition and the Australasian Telstra Cup teams playing in a home-and-away-type championship. It was also the last time the British and Australian champions faced off until the year 2000, and as of the 2013 World Club Challenge this was also the last time the single-game format was played in Australia. The game returned there in 2014, with Sydney Roosters hosting Wigan at Allianz Stadium.
