= Willie Carne =

Australian former rugby footballer

Personal information
- Full name: William Carne
- Born: 23 January 1969 (age 57) Roma, Queensland, Australia

Playing information

Rugby league
- Position: Wing, Fullback
Club
Years	Team	Pld	T	G	FG	P
1990–96	Brisbane Broncos	136	72	63	0	414
Representative
Years	Team	Pld	T	G	FG	P
1990–96	Queensland	12	5	3	0	26
1991–93	Australia	10	10	0	0	40

Rugby union
Club
Years	Team	Pld	T	G	FG	P
1997	Queensland Reds

William Carne (born 23 January 1969) is an Australian former rugby footballer who played rugby league for the Brisbane Broncos from 1990 to 1996, as well as representing both Queensland and Australia and rugby union for the Queensland Reds. An attacking player with dangerous speed, he played at wing and fullback.

== Early years ==
Carne attended Ipswich Grammar School, of which former Brisbane Broncos Kevin Walters, Kerrod Walters and Steve Walters are also Alumni. In his younger days, Carne played for the Roma Wattles.

== Brisbane Broncos career ==
In 1990 he played his first season with the Brisbane Broncos' and that year he co-won the club's rookie of the year with giant fullback Paul Hauff, as well as being the club's top try-scorer with 15.

He played for the Brisbane Broncos in the 1992 NSWRL season's grand final against the St. George Dragons, which they won. A week after winning the 1992 Rugby League World Cup final, Carne played for the Broncos on the wing in the 1992 World Club Challenge against British champions Wigan, with Brisbane winning 22–8 to become the first Australian club to win the match in Britain.

"Willie Carne is the best broken field runner in the game"

— −Peter Sterling, 1993

Carne was the Broncos' top try scorer in 1993, crossing the line for 17 tries, and enjoyed back-to-back premierships, playing on the wing in the Grand Final victory, again over St. George.

During the 1994 NSWRL season, Carne played at fullback (after being named on the wing) for the defending premiers Brisbane when they hosted British champions Wigan for the 1994 World Club Challenge. In front of a record World Club Challenge crowd of 54,220 at the ANZ Stadium in Brisbane, Wigan won 20–14.

Carne moved back to his favoured wing position in 1995 and scored 8 tries in 20 games. 1995 was the season dominated by the Super League war with Carne, like the majority of his Brisbane teammates, signing with the rebel Super League.

In his final season for the Broncos in 1996, Carne assumed the position of the club's goal-kicker and played most of the season at fullback. Carne was the top point-scorer for Brisbane with 146 points that year from 59 goals and 7 tries.

Carne played a total of 136 first-grade games for the Broncos. He crossed for 73 tries and kicked 63 goals from 103 attempts (61.17%).

In 2007, Carne was inducted into the Broncos' official Hall of Fame.

== Representative career ==
Carne made his State of Origin debut for Queensland in the third match of 1990 series.

Carne made his test début for Australia in the second test of the 1991 Trans-Tasman Test series against New Zealand at the Sydney Football Stadium. He crossed for a try as Australia defeated New Zealand 44–0. He subsequently retained his spot in the team for the final test at Lang Park in Brisbane, crossing for two tries. At the end of the 1991 season, Carne toured Papua New Guinea with the Kangaroos, scoring 3 tries in each of the two tests against the Papua New Guinea Kumuls and finished the 5 game tour as the leading try scorer with 8 and the equal top point scorer (with Gary Belcher) with 32.

In 1992, he played for Queensland in Game 1 of their 2-1 Origin series loss to New South Wales. Carne missed Games 2 and 3 of the Origin series and this kept him out of the Australian side for the first two Ashes series tests against the touring Great Britain Lions. However, after an injury to Rod Wishart he was re-called for the third test at Lang Park where Australia retained The Ashes with a 16–10 win. With Andrew Ettingshausen unavailable through injury, Carne then played fullback for Australia in their 36–12 win over Papua New Guinea in Townsville where he scored his 7th test try against the Kumuls in just 3 tests.

At the end of 1992, Carne travelled to England where he and Broncos teammate Michael Hancock were selected as the Australian wingers in their 1992 Rugby League World Cup final victory over Great Britain at London's Wembley Stadium. He was one of seven Broncos players in the Australian side on the day with the others being Hancock, Renouf, Langer, Prop forward Glenn Lazarus and replacements Kevin Walters and Chris Johns (who did not get off the reserves bench during the Final).

Carne was named man-of-the-match in the opening game of the 1994 State of Origin series at the Sydney Football Stadium. However, injury kept him out of Australia's record 58–0 win over the touring French at Parramatta Stadium, while a late season foot injury would ultimately see him ruled him out of selection for the 1994 Kangaroo Tour.

Due to being a Super League aligned player, Carne was ruled ineligible for representative games by the Australian Rugby League in 1995 which saw him miss that years Origin series and international games.

== Rugby union ==
Carne subsequently defected to rugby union, making his debut in a Queensland Reds trial match in 1997. Carne struggled in rugby union and was unable to secure a place in the Reds's regular line-up. Later that season he retired from professional sport altogether.

== Post-playing career ==
In 2000, Carne was awarded an Australian Sports Medal.

Carne is now a real estate agent on the Sunshine Coast, Queensland.
