= Peter Ryan (rugby, born 1971) =

Australian rugby league & union footballer

Personal information
- Full name: Peter Jeremy Ryan
- Born: 23 March 1971 (age 55) Ipswich, Queensland, Australia

Playing information
- Height: 186 cm (6 ft 1 in)
- Weight: 97 kg (15 st 4 lb; 214 lb)

Rugby league
- Position: Lock, Second-row
Club
Years	Team	Pld	T	G	FG	P
1991–99	Brisbane Broncos	147	23	0	0	92
Representative
Years	Team	Pld	T	G	FG	P
1997	Queensland (SL)	3	1	0	0	4
1998	Queensland	2	0	0	0	0

Rugby union
Club
Years	Team	Pld	T	G	FG	P
2000–02	ACT Brumbies	35

Peter Ryan (born 23 March 1971) is an Australian former rugby league and rugby union footballer who played in the 1990s and 2000s. A Queensland State of Origin representative forward, he played ten seasons with the Brisbane Broncos and finished his career playing rugby union for the ACT Brumbies. Peter Ryan never lost a State of Origin match or series. He also was a part of the Australia A team which beat the British & Irish Lions in 2001 in Gosford.

== Biography ==
Ryan attended Downlands College in Toowoomba. After representing Australia in rugby union as a schoolboy, he first played rugby league for Wattles Warriors in the TRL (Toowoomba Rugby League), before playing for the Brisbane Rugby League premiership's Western Suburbs club, Ryan moved to the Broncos in 1990.

=== Professional playing career ===
In the weeks following Brisbane's inaugural premiership win Ryan travelled with the club to England, where he played from the interchange bench in the 1992 World Club Challenge against British champions Wigan, helping Brisbane become the first Australian club to win the match in Britain. A handy utility forward, the following season he was part of Brisbane's 1993 Winfield Cup triumph.

During the 1994 NSWRL season, Ryan played from the interchange bench for defending premiers Brisbane when they hosted British champions Wigan for the 1994 World Club Challenge. Also during the 1994 season, Ryan was suspended for three matches after being found guilty of biting South Sydney player Jason Bell.

In 1997 Ryan debuted for Queensland and was selected to play in all 3 matches of the Super League Tri-series. He was named Brisbane's player of the year in the 1997 premiership-winning season, Ryan's second title with the club. He played for Queensland in Games 1 and 3 of the 1998 State of Origin series. Only a suspension, which ruled him out of the 1998 NRL grand final, denied him the opportunity of winning a third premiership with the Broncos in 1998.

At the end of 1999, Ryan left the Brisbane club to play rugby union with the ACT Brumbies. During 2001's pre-season, Wendell Sailor declared he was "leaning towards" switching codes from rugby league to rugby union following advice from former Broncos teammate Ryan. Ryan played for the Brumbies in their 2001 Super 12 season's grand final win. In doing so, he became the first player in history to win grand finals in both the NRL and Super Rugby. He also played in the 2002 Super 12 season's grand final loss for the Brumbies.

=== Post-playing ===
During the 2000s Ryan, who has been described by Craig Bellamy as "one of the most devastating defenders to have played the game", returned to the Brisbane Broncos as a part-time defence coach.

Renowned during his playing days for his tough and uncompromising tackling technique, Ryan was appointed as a 'contact' coach for the North Queensland Cowboys before switching to a similar role with the ACT Brumbies rugby union team in Super Rugby.

He was signed as defensive coach of the Queensland Reds for the 2019 season.
