= Andrew Gee (rugby league) =

Australian rugby league footballer, coach and administrator

Personal information
- Born: 23 April 1970 (age 56) Brisbane, Queensland, Australia

Playing information
- Height: 185 cm (6 ft 1 in)
- Weight: 110 kg (17 st 5 lb)
- Position: Prop, Second-row
Club
Years	Team	Pld	T	G	FG	P
1989–99	Brisbane Broncos	215	10	0	0	40
2000–01	Warrington Wolves	40	4	0	0	16
2002–03	Brisbane Broncos	40	2	0	0	8
	Total	295	16	0	0	64
Representative
Years	Team	Pld	T	G	FG	P
1990–03	Queensland	17	1	0	0	4
1997	Queensland (SL)	1	0	0	0	0
1991	Australia
- Source: ]

Andrew Gee (born 23 April 1970) is an Australian rugby league administrator and former football operations manager at the Brisbane Broncos of the NRL. Also a former player with the club, he was a Queensland State of Origin representative prop, and at the time of his retirement, held the Broncos' club record for most appearances of any forward.

== Playing career ==
While attending Beaudesert High School, Gee played for the Australian Schoolboys team in 1986. He transferred from Beaudesert, Queensland to play in the NSWRL Premiership for the Brisbane Broncos in 1989, the club's second season. He started his representative career for Queensland the following year, selected as a reserve in games 2 and 3 of the 1990 State of Origin series.

Gee was rewarded after his strong display in the 1991 State of Origin series with selection for the 1991 Kangaroo tour of Papua New Guinea, making just one non-Test match appearance before being injured. He also met a similar fate the following season, played just seven matches and was left out of the starting line up that defeated St George Dragons 28–8 in the 1992 NSWRL Grand Final. In the weeks following the grand final Gee traveled with the Broncos to England, where he played as a prop in the 1992 World Club Challenge against British champions Wigan, helping Brisbane become the first Australian club to win the World Club Challenge in Britain. Gee was a reserve when the club won the second of its two consecutive premierships in 1993. He overcame a lengthy suspension at the beginning of the 1994 season to take his place in the side that lost the 1994 World Club Challenge to Wigan, 20–14, at ANZ Stadium in June in front of a WCC record attendance of 54,220 fans.

Gee toiled with the Broncos through the club's domination of the 1997 Super League season and took his place in the champion Brisbane team that won the 1998 NRL grand final. In 1998 he also won the club's player of the year award. He left the club at the end of 1999 to join Warrington but later returned to the Broncos, along with former captain Allan Langer, for the 2002 season. Sometimes criticized for lack of discipline resulting in needless penalties which potentially cost his team victories, Gee finished his playing career in 2003. That year he also made the State of Origin team, some 13 years after his first representative match. He was the first player to play 250+ games for the Broncos. Early in the 2007 season at the Broncos' 20-year anniversary celebration, the club announced a list of the 20 best players to play for them to date which included Gee. In 2009 Gee was inducted into the Broncos official Hall of Fame.

Although Gee was well revered as a sturdy, defensive player. He kicked twice during his first grade rugby league career, with one kick resulting in a 40/20 and the other forcing a dropout.

== Coaching and administration career ==
Gee continued to serve at the Broncos assisting the coaching staff. In 2010 he was appointed the club's general manager of football operations.
