= Chris Johns (rugby league) =

Australia international rugby league footballer

Personal information
- Full name: Christopher Johns
- Born: 14 March 1964 (age 62) Brisbane, Queensland, Australia

Playing information
- Height: 181 cm (5 ft 11 in)
- Weight: 85 kg (13 st 5 lb)
- Position: Centre, Wing
Club
| Years | Team | Pld | T | G | FG | P |
|---|---|---|---|---|---|---|
| 1984–87 | St. George Dragons | 56 | 7 | 0 | 0 | 28 |
| 1986–87 | Castleford | 18 | 7 | 0 | 0 | 28 |
| 1988–96 | Brisbane Broncos | 171 | 50 | 0 | 0 | 200 |
| 1989–90 | Barrow | 12 | 3 | 0 | 0 | 12 |
| | Total | 257 | 67 | 0 | 0 | 268 |
Representative
| Years | Team | Pld | T | G | FG | P |
| 1989–94 | New South Wales | 10 | 3 | 0 | 0 | 12 |
| 1990–92 | Australia | 9 | 2 | 0 | 0 | 8 |
| 1989–94 | NSW City | 4 | 0 | 0 | 0 | 0 |

Chris Johns (born 14 March 1964) is an Australian former rugby league footballer who played in the 1980s and 1990s. He played in the centres, achieving representative honors for Australia and New South Wales. His club football career was spent with the St. George Dragons and Brisbane Broncos, as well as two spells in England, first with Castleford in 1986-87 and then Barrow in 1989–90. After retiring from the playing field, Johns worked in the administration of the Brisbane Broncos and Melbourne Storm clubs.

== Playing career ==
Although born in Queensland, Johns was raised in the St George District of Sydney. Johns played his junior rugby league for Penshurst RSL.

Johns made his first grade début for St. George during the 1984 NSWRL season and the following year played as a reserve back for St. George in their 6–7 loss to Canterbury in the Grand Final after earlier playing in the Dragons winning reserve grade grand final side.

Johns played at centre in the 31–24 victory over Hull F.C. in Castleford's 1986 Yorkshire Cup Final during the 1986–87 season at Headingley, Leeds, on Saturday 11 October 1986. Johns then moved to the New South Wales Rugby Football League premiership's newly created Brisbane Broncos in 1988.

In 1989 Chris Johns (despite being born in Queensland) became the first Queensland based player to play State of Origin for New South Wales when he made his début for the Blues on the wing for Game 1 of the 1989 State of Origin series at Lang Park, the home of the Broncos. Johns was the top try-scorer of the 1989 Brisbane Broncos season

Johns went on to play 10 games for NSW between 1989 and 1994, scoring 3 tries. Although a centre at club level, Johns pace saw him play mainly on the wing or from the bench in representative sides with Australia blessed with top class centres in Mal Meninga, Laurie Daley, Dale Shearer, Andrew Ettingshausen and Brad Fittler.

At the end of the 1990 NSWRL season, and despite not playing for NSW in the 1990 State of Origin series, Johns was selected for the 1990 Kangaroo tour of Great Britain and France where he played in 11 tour games and scored 4 tries on tour. Chris Johns made his test début for Australia as a reserve back in the final game of the tour against France at the Stade Gilbert Brutus in Perpignan.

During 1991 Johns played in NSW 1–2 series loss to Queensland in the 1991 Origin series and was then chosen for all three mis-season Trans-Tasman Tests against New Zealand, making his run on début for Australia in the 1st Test loss to the Kiwis at Olympic Park Stadium in Melbourne. Following the end of the 1991 season, Johns was part of the Australian touring side to Papua New Guinea, playing in both tests against the Kumuls.

Johns continued good form saw him play on the wing during Game 3 of NSW's 2-1 1992 State of Origin series win over Qld. That year saw the 1992 Great Britain Lions tour of Australia and New Zealand with Johns selected as a reserve for the 2nd Test against the Lions at Melbourne's Princes Park where he scored his 1st test try in Australia's shock 10–33 loss. After being overlooked for the opening test, Johns was called into the side to replace Brad Fittler who was given leave from the team following the death of his Penrith teammate Ben Alexander. Johns retained his spot for the 3rd test in Brisbane and helped Australia retain The Ashes which they have held since 1973. Following this Johns was selected for what would be his last test for Australia as a reserve back, scoring his 2nd test try in the 36–14 win over Papua New Guinea in Townsville.

In the weeks following the Broncos maiden Grand Final over St. George in 1992, Johns travelled with the Broncos to England, where he played at centre in the 1992 World Club Challenge against British champions Wigan at Wigan's famous Central Park, helping Brisbane become the first Australian club to win the match in Britain. A week earlier he was a non-playing reserve in Australia's 10–6 win over Great Britain in the World Cup final at Wembley Stadium, London in front of a World Record rugby league test crowd of 73,631 fans (Johns was the only Australian selected in the 17 not to get any game time in the final).

Chris Johns was overlooked for both Origin and Test selection in 1993 but went on to play 24 games and score 9 tries in the 1993 NSWRL season for the Broncos, helping them to a second straight Grand Final win over St. George.

Johns continued to play well for the Broncos in 1994, form which saw him selected for games 2 and 3 for NSW in their 2-1 Origin series win over Qld. Mid-way through the season he was also part of Brisbane's 14–20 loss to Wigan in the 1994 World Club Challenge at Brisbane's ANZ Stadium in front of a still WCC record crowd of 54,220.

Johns had an injury interrupted season for the Broncos in 1995, playing just nine games and scoring 2 tries. His final season before announcing his retirement was the 1996 ARL season, where he played 21 games but surprisingly failed to score a try.

From his début with St. George in 1984 until his retirement following 1996, Chris Johns played in 223 games (52 for St. George, 171 for Brisbane) and scored 57 tries (7 and 50), winning two premierships and one World Club Challenge for the Broncos. He represented NSW on 10 occasions, scoring 3 tries and played in 9 tests for Australia, scoring 2 tries. He also played for Castleford and Barrow in England and represented NSW City Origin on 4 occasions between 1989 and 1994.

== Career stats ==
=== NSWRL/ARL ===
| Season | Team | Appearances | Tries | Goals | Goal-kicking percentage | Field goals | Points |
|---|---|---|---|---|---|---|---|
| 1984 NSWRL Season | St. George Dragons | 10 | 2 | - | - | - | 8 |
| 1985 NSWRL Season | St. George Dragons | 10 | 1 | - | - | - | 4 |
| 1986 NSWRL Season | St. George Dragons | 19 | 2 | - | - | - | 8 |
| 1987 NSWRL Season | St. George Dragons | 15 | 2 | - | - | - | 8 |
| 1988 NSWRL Season | Brisbane Broncos | 18 | 6 | - | - | - | 24 |
| 1989 NSWRL Season | Brisbane Broncos | 20 | 10 | - | - | - | 40 |
| 1990 NSWRL Season | Brisbane Broncos | 25 | 8 | - | - | - | 32 |
| 1991 NSWRL Season | Brisbane Broncos | 16 | 8 | - | - | - | 32 |
| 1992 NSWRL Season | Brisbane Broncos | 21 | 6 | - | - | - | 24 |
| 1993 NSWRL Season | Brisbane Broncos | 24 | 9 | - | - | - | 36 |
| 1994 NSWRL Season | Brisbane Broncos | 17 | 1 | - | - | - | 4 |
| 1995 ARL Season | Brisbane Broncos | 9 | 2 | - | - | - | 8 |
| 1996 ARL Season | Brisbane Broncos | 21 | - | - | - | - | - |

=== Representative ===
| Years | Team | Appearances | Tries | Goals | Goal-kicking percentage | Field goals | Points |
|---|---|---|---|---|---|---|---|
| 1990-92 | Australia | 9 | 2 | - | - | - | 8 |
| 1989, 1991–92, 1994 | New South Wales | 9 | 3 | - | - | - | 12 |
| 1989-90, 1993–94 | City | 4 | - | - | - | - | 0 |

== Post-playing ==
Following retirement Johns worked in the Brisbane Broncos administration before moving south with John Ribot to help set up the new Melbourne Storm club. He was responsible for signing the key players that allowed Melbourne to win the premiership in only their second season. He left the post at the end of 2002.

In 2000 Johns was awarded the Australian Sports Medal for his contribution to Australia's international standing in the sport of rugby league.

In 2005 Johns became the 6th former player inducted into the Broncos official Hall of Fame.

During the 2007 season at the Broncos' 20-year anniversary celebration, the club announced a list of the 20 best players to play for them to date which included Johns.
