= List of Brisbane Broncos players =

This article lists all rugby league footballers who have played first-grade rugby league for the Brisbane Broncos in the National Rugby League, NRL Under-20s and NRLW.

== Men ==
This article lists all rugby league footballers who have played first-grade for the Brisbane Broncos in the National Rugby League.

Notes:

- Debut:
  - Players are listed in the order of their debut game with the club.
  - Players that debuted in the same game are added by jersey number.
- Appearances: Brisbane Broncos games only, not a total of their career games. For example, Brent Tate has played a career total of 229 first-grade games but of those, 114 were at the Broncos.
- Previous Club: refers to the previous first-grade rugby league club (NRL, QRL, or Super League) the player played at and does not refer to any junior club, rugby union club or a rugby league club he was signed to but never played at.

== List of players ==
=== Men ===
- The statistics in this table are correct as of the end of the 2026 NRL season.

Cap No.	Name	Nationality	Broncos career	Debut round	Previous club	Games	Tries	Goals	Field goals	Points
1.	Colin Scott	(Australia)	1988	Rd. 1	Castleford Tigers	14	2	0	0	
2.	Joe Kilroy	(Australia)	1988–91	Rd. 1	Past Brothers	35	12	0	0	48
3.	Chris Johns	(Australia)	1988–96	Rd. 1	St. George Dragons	171	50	0	0	200
4.	Gene Miles	(Australia)	1988–91	Rd. 1	Wynnum Manly Seagulls	72	20	0	0	80
5.	Michael Hancock	(Australia)	1988–00	Rd. 1	Debut	274	120	2	0	484
6.	Wally Lewis	(Australia)	1988–90	Rd. 1	Wynnum Manly Seagulls	46	20	11	0	102
7.	Allan Langer	(Australia)	1988–99, 2002	Rd. 1	Ipswich Jets	258	100	8	6	422
8.	Terry Matterson	(Australia)	1988–95	Rd. 1	Eastern Suburbs Roosters	155	29	314	0	744
9.	Brett Le Man	(Australia)	1988–91	Rd. 1	Past Brothers	28	9	0	0	36
10.	Keith Gee	(Australia)	1988	Rd. 1	Debut	12	1	0	0	4
11.	Greg Dowling	(Australia)	1988–91	Rd. 1	Wigan Warriors	69	6	0	0	24
12.	Greg Conescu	(Australia)	1988–89	Rd. 1	Redcliffe Dolphins	28	4	0	0	16
13.	Bryan Niebling	(Australia)	1988–89	Rd. 1	Redcliffe Dolphins	20	2	0	0	8
14.	Craig Grauf	(Australia)	1988	Rd. 1	Debut	5	0	0	0	0
15.	Mark Hohn	(Australia)	1988–94	Rd. 1	Fortitude Valley Diehards	118	5	0	0	20
16.	Billy Noke	(Australia)	1988	Rd. 1	St. George Dragons	16	3	0	0	12
17.	Kerrod Walters	(Australia)	1988–96, 2000	Rd. 2	Ipswich Jets	182	23	0	0	92
18.	David Bourke	(Australia)	1988	Rd. 3	Fortitude Valley Diehards	3	1	0	0	4
19.	Rohan Teevan	(Australia)	1988–90	Rd. 3	Redcliffe Dolphins	22	7	0	0	28
20.	Andrew Tessmann	(Australia)	1988–92	Rd. 4	Wynnum Manly Seagulls	34	1	0	0	4
21.	Brad Tessmann	(Australia)	1988	Rd. 6	Eastern Suburbs Roosters	4	0	0	0	0
22.	Peter Benson	(Australia)	1988	Rd. 8	North Sydney Bears	4	0	0	0	0
23.	Brett Plowman	(Australia)	1988–93	Rd. 9	Debut	53	17	0	0	68
24.	Gary French	(Australia)	1988–89	Rd. 10	Souths Brisbane	27	2	10	0	28
25.	Shane Duffy	(Australia)	1988–89	Rd. 12	Debut	22	0	0	0	0
26.	Brook Kennedy	(Australia)	1988–89	Rd. 15	Easts Tigers	3	0	0	0	0
27.	Ray Herring	(Australia)	1988–90	Rd. 16	Fortitude Valley Diehards	5	0	0	0	0
28.	Grant Rix	(Australia)	1988–90	Rd. 16	Fortitude Valley Diehards	20	2	0	0	8
29.	Craig Teevan	(Australia)	1988–90, 1993	Rd. 18	Debut	8	2	0	0	8
30.	Sam Backo	(Australia)	1989–90	Rd. 1	Leeds Rhinos	20	3	0		
31.	Tony Currie	(Australia)	1989–92	Rd. 1	Canterbury Bulldogs	38	13	0	0	52
32.	James Donnelly	(Australia)	1989–91	Rd. 1	Canterbury Bulldogs	23	2	0	0	8
33.	Andrew Gee	(Australia)	1989–99, 2002–03	Rd. 1	Debut	255	12	0	0	48
34.	Grant Graving	(Australia)	1989	Rd. 1	Debut	7	2	0	0	8
35.	Ken Gittins	(Australia)	1989	Rd. 2	Penrith Panthers	4	0	0	0	0
36.	Steve Renouf	(Australia)	1989–99	Rd. 3	Debut	183	142	0	0	568
37.	Peter Jackson	(Australia)	1989–90	Rd. 9	Canberra Raiders	29	5	0	0	20
38.	Scott Tronc	(Australia)	1989–90	Rd. 13	Western Suburbs Magpies	21	0	0	0	0
39.	Grant Thorogood	(Australia)	1989	Rd. 16	Debut	1	0	0	0	0
40.	Dale Shearer	(Australia)	1990–91	Rd. 1	Manly Sea Eagles	27	15	48	0	156
41.	Kevin Walters	(Australia)	1990–01	Rd. 1	Canberra Raiders	241	65	0	0	256
42.	Gavin Allen	(Australia)	1990–95	Rd. 4	St. George Dragons	66	2	0	0	8
43.	Alan Cann	(Australia)	1990–96	Rd. 4	Debut	100	16	0	0	64
44.	Willie Carne	(Australia)	1990–96	Rd. 6	Debut	135	72	63	0	414
45.	Paul Hauff	(Australia)	1990–96	Rd. 6	Debut	51	19	0	0	76
46.	Bob Conway	(Australia)	1990–91	Rd. 19	Debut	12	1	16	0	36
47.	John Plath	(Australia)	1990–99	Rd. 21	Debut	149	20	0	0	80
48.	Trevor Gillmeister	(Australia)	1991–93	Rd. 1	Eastern Suburbs Roosters	72	8	0	0	32
49.	Willie Morganson	(Australia)	1991–93	Rd. 3	Debut	18	4	0	0	16
50.	Jason Hanrahan	(Australia)	1991	Rd. 5	Debut	1	0	0	0	0
51.	Julian O'Neill	(Australia)	1991–95	Rd. 11	Debut	105	33	169	9	479
52.	Paul Iles	(Australia)	1991	Rd. 14	Debut	1	0	0	0	0
53.	Peter Ryan	(Australia)	1991–99	Rd. 19	Debut	147	23	0	0	0"
54.	Glenn Lazarus	(Australia)	1992–97	Rd. 1	Canberra Raiders	108	9	0	0	36
55.	Pat Savage	(Australia)	1992–94	Rd. 4	Debut	14	3	0	0	12
56.	Shaun Keating	(Australia)	1992–93	Rd. 8	Debut	5	0	0	0	0
57.	Darren Plowman	(Australia)	1992–93	Rd. 8	Debut	2	0	0	0	0
58.	Scott Blacker	(Australia)	1992–96	Rd. 9	Debut	14	4	0	0	16
59.	Jason Erba	(Australia)	1992	Rd. 20	Debut	1	0	0	0	0
60.	Butch Fatnowna	(Australia)	1992–93	Rd. 22	Debut	2	0	0	0	0
61.	Chris McKenna	(Australia)	1993–94	Rd. 8	Debut	13	4	0	0	16
62.	Kieran Meyer	(Australia)	1993	Rd. 8	Debut	3	1	0	0	4
63.	Brett Galea	(Australia)	1993–96	Rd. 11	Debut	32	3	0	0	12
64.	Sid Domic	(Australia)	1993–94	Rd. 12	Debut	4	0	0	0	0
65.	Wendell Sailor	(Australia)	1993–01	Rd. 12	Debut	189	110	1	0	442
66.	Brad Thorn	(Australia)	1994–00, 2005-07	Rd. 1	Debut	200	32	0	0	128
67.	Russell Bawden	(Australia)	1994	Rd. 13	Debut	2	0	0	0	0
68.	Paul Morris	(Australia)	1994	Rd. 13	Debut	4	1	0	0	4
69.	John Driscoll	(Australia)	1994–99	Rd. 14	Debut	32	1	0	0	4
70.	Darren Smith	(Australia)	1995–99, 2004–05	Rd. 1	Canterbury Bulldogs	105	61	0	0	244
71.	Shane Webcke	(Australia)	1995–06	Rd. 10	Debut	254	18	0	0	72
72.	Brett Green	(Australia)	1995–96	Rd. 13	Debut	27	0	0	0	0
73.	Darren Lockyer	(Australia)	1995–11	Rd. 13	Debut	355	122	341	21	1191
74.	Ben Walker	(Australia)	1995–00	Rd. 13	Debut	72	13	95	0	242
75.	Steele Retchless	(Australia)	1995–96	Rd. 15	Debut	11	1	0	0	4
76.	Tonie Carroll	(New Zealand) (Australia)	1996–00, 2003-09	Rd. 5	Debut	218	55	0	0	220
77.	Robbie Ross	(Australia)	1996	Rd. 11	Newcastle Knights	12	8	0	0	32
78.	Shane Walker	(Australia)	1996–02	Rd. 11	Debut	83	5	0	0	20
79.	Dennis Scott	(Australia)	1996–98	Rd. 22	Debut	6	0	0	0	0
80.	Anthony Mundine	(Australia)	1997	Rd. 1	St. George Dragons	11	3	0	0	12
81.	Gorden Tallis	(Australia)	1997–2004	Rd. 1	St. George Dragons	158	49	0	0	196
82.	Michael De Vere	(Australia)	1997–04	Rd. 3	Debut	161	64	403	0	1062
83.	Phillip Lee	(Australia)	1997–03	Rd. 7	South Queensland Crushers	85	11	0	0	44
84.	Kevin Campion	(Australia)	1998–00	Rd. 1	Adelaide Rams	80	9	0	0	36
85.	Danny Bampton	(Australia)	1998–00	Rd. 4	Debut	10	1	0	0	4
86.	Petero Civoniceva	(Australia) (Fiji)	1998–07, 2012	Rd. 7	Debut	235	22	0	0	88
87.	Luke Priddis	(Australia)	1999–01	Rd. 2	Canberra Raiders	79	17	0	0	68
88.	Lote Tuqiri	(Australia) (Fiji)	1999–02	Rd. 2	Debut	99	56	18	0	250
89.	Chris Walker	(Australia)	1999–02	Rd. 2	Debut	67	40	0	0	160
90.	Shaun Berrigan	(Australia)	1999–07	Rd. 11	Debut	186	77	0	0	308
91.	Dane Carlaw	(Australia)	1999–07, 2011	Rd. 11	Debut	188	25	0	0	100
92.	Harvey Howard	(United Kingdom) (England)	2000	Rd. 1	Western Suburbs Magpies	14	0	0	0	0
93.	Ben Ikin	(Australia)	2000–04	Rd. 1	North Sydney Bears	55	18	2	0	76
94.	Ashley Harrison	(Australia)	2000–02	Rd. 3	Debut	52	16	0	0	64
95.	Carl Webb	(Australia)	2000–04	Rd. 6	Debut	66	21	0	0	84
96.	Darren Mapp	(Australia)	2000, 2003–05	Rd. 10	Debut	38	1	0	0	4
97.	Justin Hodges	(Australia)	2000–01, 2005–15	Rd. 14	Debut	193	73	1	0	294
98.	Brad Meyers	(Australia)	2000–04	Rd. 14	Debut	102	7	0	0	28
99.	Damon Keating	(Australia)	2000–01	Rd. 18	Debut	4	0	0	0	0
100.	Adam Warwick	(Australia)	2000	Rd. 18	North Queensland Cowboys	1	0	0	0	0
101.	Scott Prince	(Australia)	2001–03, 2013	Rd. 1	North Queensland Cowboys	50	8	59	0	150
102.	Stuart Kelly	(Australia)	2001–05	Rd. 2	Parramatta Eels	82	21	0	0	84
103.	Darren Burns	(Australia)	2001	Rd. 6	Debut	19	0	0	0	0
104.	Corey Parker	(Australia)	2001–16	Rd. 6	Debut	347	39	586	0	1328
105.	Mark Corvo	(Australia)	2001	Rd. 12	Canberra Raiders	8	0	0	0	0
106.	Michael Ryan	(Australia)	2001–04	Rd. 16	Debut	20	1	0	0	4
107.	Casey McGuire	(Australia)	2001–06	Rd. 21	Parramatta Eels	115	25	1	1	101
108.	Brent Tate	(Australia)	2001–07	Rd. 21	Debut	114	41	0	0	164
109.	Michael Coorey	(Lebanon)	2001–03	Finals week 2	North Queensland Cowboys	7	0	0	0	0
110.	Steve Irwin	(Australia)	2002–04	Rd. 1	Debut	6	4	0	0	16
111.	Brett Seymour	(Australia)	2002—06	Rd. 11	Debut	62	12	32	2	114
112.	Elia Tuqiri	(Australia)	2002	Rd. 11	Debut	2	0	0	0	0
113.	Nathan Friend	(Australia)	2002	Rd. 12	Debut	1	0	0	0	0
114.	Kris Kahler	(Australia)	2002	Rd. 12	Debut	1	0	0	0	0
115.	Steve Lacaze	(Australia)	2002	Rd. 12	Debut	1	0	0	0	0
116.	Scott Minto	(Australia)	2002–06	Rd. 12	Debut	39	12	0	0	48
117.	Nick Parfitt	(Australia)	2002–03	Rd. 12	Debut	5	0	0	0	0
118.	Robert Tanielu	(New Zealand)	2002	Rd. 12	Debut	1	1	0	0	4
119.	Neale Wyatt	(Australia)	2002–05	Rd. 16	Debut	11	1	0	0	4
120.	Richard Swain	(New Zealand)	2003	Rd. 1	Melbourne Storm	21	0	2	0	4
121.	Craig Frawley	(Australia)	2003–04, 2007	Rd. 6	Debut	39	15	0	0	60
122.	Barry Berrigan	(Australia)	2003–05	Rd. 11	Canterbury Bulldogs	32	6	0	0	24
123.	Tony Duggan	(Australia)	2003	Rd. 18	Debut	1	0	0	0	0
124.	David Stagg	(Australia)	2003–08, 2013–15	Rd. 18	Debut	112	18	0	0	72
125.	Sam Thaiday	(Australia)	2003–18	Rd. 18	Debut	304	40	1	0	162
126.	Neville Costigan	(Australia)	2003–06	Rd. 26	Debut	45	4	0	0	16
127.	Karmichael Hunt	(Australia)	2004–09, 2021	Rd. 1	Debut	127	53	0	1	213
128.	Motu Tony	(Samoa)	2004	Rd. 1	New Zealand Warriors	3	2	0	0	8
129.	Tom Learoyd-Lahrs	(Australia)	2004–05	Rd. 2	Debut	10	0	0	0	0
130.	Ben Czislowski	(Australia)	2004	Rd. 17	Debut	1	0	0	0	0
131.	Paul Green	(Australia)	2004	Rd. 22	Parramatta Eels	5	0	0	0	0
132.	Tame Tupou	(Australia)	2004–07	Rd. 26	Debut	25	15	0	0	60
133.	Leon Bott	(Australia)	2005–06	Rd. 1	Debut	25	14	0	0	56
134.	Berrick Barnes	(Australia)	2005	Rd. 8	Debut	9	1	0	0	4
135.	Steven Michaels	(Australia)	2005–10	Rd. 14	Debut	59	22	0	0	88
136.	Nick Kenny	(Australia)	2005–11	Rd. 17	Debut	78	3	0	0	12
137.	Greg Eastwood	(Australia)	2005–09	Rd. 26	Debut	64	15	0	0	60
138.	Darius Boyd	(Australia)	2006–08, 2015–20	Rd. 1	Debut	206	57	0	0	228
139.	Michael Ennis	(Australia)	2006–08	Rd. 1	St. George Illawarra Dragons	42	8	63	0	158
140.	Shane Perry	(Australia)	2006–08	Rd. 1	Canterbury Bulldogs	43	4	0	0	16
141.	Ben Hannant	(Australia)	2006–08, 2011–14	Rd. 5	Sydney Roosters	148	12	0	0	48
142.	Ian Lacey	(Australia)	2006–07	Rd. 6	Debut	23	0	0	0	0
143.	Fraser Anderson	(New Zealand)	2006	Rd. 14	Debut	2	1	0	0	4
144.	Joel Moon	(Australia)	2006–08	Rd. 14	Debut	31	10	0	0	40
145.	Dave Taylor	(Australia)	2006–09	Rd. 14	Debut	49	9	0	0	36
146.	Nick Emmett	(Australia)	2006–08	Rd. 17	Debut	17	1	0	0	4
147.	Ben Vaeau	(New Zealand)	2006	Rd. 17	Debut	1	0	0	0	0
148.	John Te Reo	(New Zealand)	2007	Rd. 2	Debut	7	0	0	0	0
149.	Andrew Lomu	(Tonga) (New Zealand)	2007	Rd. 3	Canberra Raiders	1	0	0	0	0
150.	Denan Kemp	(Australia)	2007–08, 2010	Rd. 10	Debut	32	21	0	0	84
151.	Mick Roberts	(Australia)	2007	Rd. 10	Debut	5	0	0	0	0
152.	Clifford Manua	(Australia)	2007	Rd. 14	Cronulla Sharks	4	0	0	0	0
153.	Alwyn Simpson	(Australia)	2007	Finals week 1	Debut	1	0	0	0	0
154.	Joel Clinton	(Australia)	2008–09	Rd. 1	Penrith Panthers	45	3	0	0	12
155.	PJ Marsh	(Australia)	2008–09	Rd. 1	Parramatta Eels	15	1	0	0	4
156.	Reece Robinson	(Lebanon)	2008	Rd. 1	Debut	13	4	0	0	16
157.	Ashton Sims	(Fiji)	2008–10	Rd. 1	St. George Illawarra Dragons	57	2	0	0	8
158.	Peter Wallace	(Australia) (Scotland)	2008–13	Rd. 1	Penrith Panthers	139	20	66	4	216
159.	Derrick Watkins	(Australia)	2008	Rd. 9	North Queensland Cowboys	4	0	0	0	0
160.	Isaak Ah Mau	(New Zealand) (Samoa)	2008–09	Rd. 10	Debut	4	0	0	0	0
161.	Andrew McCullough	(Australia)	2008–20	Rd. 10	Debut	260	32	1	1	131
162.	Josh Hoffman	(New Zealand)	2008–14	Rd. 13	Debut	109	33	0	0	132
163.	Kaine Manihera	(New Zealand)	2008	Rd. 14	Debut	9	2	0	0	8
164.	Israel Folau	(Australia)	2009–10	Rd. 1	Melbourne Storm	39	37	0	0	148
165.	Alex Glenn	(New Zealand)	2009–21	Rd. 1	Debut	285	58	0	0	232
166.	Aaron Gorrell	(Australia)	2009	Rd. 1	Catalans Dragons	12	0	1	0	2
167.	Lagi Setu	(Samoa)	2009–10	Rd. 1	St. George Illawarra Dragons	33	4	0	0	16
168.	Ben Te'o	(Samoa)	2009–12, 2020–21	Rd. 1	Wests Tigers	96	29	0	0	112
169.	Antonio Winterstein	(Samoa)	2009–10	Rd. 1	Debut	47	19	0	0	76
170.	Jharal Yow Yeh	(Australia)	2009–12	Rd. 1	Debut	60	33	0	0	132
171.	Josh McGuire	(Samoa) (Australia)	2009–18	Rd. 3	Debut	194	11	0	0	44
172.	Palmer Wapau	(Australia)	2009	Rd. 7	Debut	5	0	0	0	0
173.	Gerard Beale	(New Zealand)	2009–12	Rd. 9	Debut	63	20	0	0	80
174.	Dale Copley	(Australia)	2009–15, 2021	Rd. 15	Debut	75	32	0	0	128
175.	Ben Hunt	(Australia)	2009–17 2025-	Rd. 15	Debut	226	49	26	1	249
176.	Guy Williams	(New Zealand)	2009	Rd. 15	Debut	5	0	0	0	0
177.	David Hala	(Tonga)	2009–14	Rd. 21	Debut	37	3	0	0	12
178.	Scott Anderson	(Australia)	2010–13	Rd. 1	Melbourne Storm	51	0	0	0	0
179.	Mitchell Dodds	(Australia)	2010–15	Rd. 1	Debut	76	3	0	0	12
180.	Matt Gillett	(Australia)	2010–19	Rd. 1	Debut	200	58	0	0	232
181.	Corey Norman	(Australia)	2010–13	Rd. 1	Debut	62	13	2	0	56
182.	Mitch Rivett	(Australia)	2010	Rd. 4	Debut	2	0	0	0	0
183.	Dunamis Lui	(Samoa)	2010–13	Rd. 5	Debut	32	1	0	0	4
184.	Shane Tronc	(Australia)	2010–11	Rd. 7	North Queensland Cowboys	22	0	0	0	0
185.	Michael Spence	(Australia)	2010	Rd. 9	Debut	1	0	0	0	0
186.	Dane Gagai	(Australia)	2011	Rd. 1	Debut	6	4	0	0	16
187.	Jack Reed	(England)	2011–16	Rd. 1	Debut	128	49	0	0	196
188.	Kurt Baptiste	(Papua New Guinea)	2011–12	Rd. 12	Debut	5	1	0	0	4
189.	Shea Moylan	(Australia)	2011	Rd. 14	Debut	1	0	0	0	0
190.	Nick Slyney	(Australia)	2012–13	Rd. 1	North Queensland Cowboys	6	1	0	0	4
191.	Luke Capewell	(Australia)	2012	Rd. 10	Gold Coast Titans	5	1	0	0	4
192.	Brendon Gibb	(Australia)	2012	Rd. 14	Debut	3	0	0	0	0
193.	Lachlan Maranta	(Australia)	2012–16	Rd. 14	Debut	70	30	0	0	120
194.	Jarrod Wallace	(Australia)	2012–16	Rd. 14	Debut	73	5	0	0	20
195.	Aaron Whitchurch	(Australia)	2012–15	Rd. 17	Debut	5	1	0	0	4
196.	Jordan Kahu	(New Zealand)	2013–18, 2020	Rd. 4	Debut	97	42	145	3	461
197.	Jake Granville	(Australia)	2013–14	Rd. 10	Debut	10	2	0	0	8
198.	Corey Oates	(Australia)	2013–24	Rd. 17	Debut	216	121	0	0	484
199.	Lama Tasi	(Samoa)	2013	Rd. 18	Sydney Roosters	7	0	0	0	0
200.	Jordan Drew	(Australia)	2013	Rd. 22	Debut	1	1	0	0	4
201.	Ben Barba	(Australia)	2014	Rd. 1	Canterbury Bulldogs	25	8	0	0	32
202.	Martin Kennedy	(Australia)	2014	Rd. 1	Sydney Roosters	16	0	0	0	0
203.	Todd Lowrie	(Australia)	2014	Rd. 1	New Zealand Warriors	18	1	0	0	4
204.	Daniel Vidot	(Samoa)	2014–15	Rd. 1	St. George Illawarra Dragons	31	12	0	0	48
205.	Francis Molo	(Cook Islands)	2014–15	Rd. 11	Debut	6	0	0	0	0
206.	Anthony Milford	(Samoa) (Australia)	2015–21	Rd. 1	Canberra Raiders	151	49	33	13	275
207.	Adam Blair	(New Zealand)	2015–17	Rd. 1	Wests Tigers	71	4	0	0	16
208.	James Gavet	(Samoa)	2015	Rd. 1	Debut	1	0	0	0	0
209.	Joe Ofahengaue	(Tonga) (Australia)	2015–20	Rd. 2	Debut	105	6	0	0	24
210.	Kodi Nikorima	(New Zealand)	2015–19	Rd. 2	Debut	86	22	0	0	88
211.	Mitch Garbutt	(Australia)	2015	Rd. 5	Debut	3	0	0	0	0
212.	Joe Boyce	(Australia)	2015	Rd. 11	Debut	1	0	0	0	0
213.	Matt Parcell	(Australia)	2015	Rd. 12	Debut	6	0	0	0	0
214.	Ashley Taylor	(Australia)	2015	Rd. 26	Debut	1	0	0	0	0
215.	Greg Eden	(England)	2016	Rd. 1	Gateshead Thunder	7	2	0	0	8
216.	James Roberts	(Australia)	2016–19	Rd. 1	Gold Coast Titans	79	40	0	0	160
217.	Herman Ese'ese	(Samoa) (New Zealand)	2016–17	Rd. 8	Canterbury Bulldogs	30	1	0	0	4
218.	Travis Waddell	(Australia)	2016–17	Rd. 9	Newcastle Knights	5	0	0	0	0
219.	Jai Arrow	(Australia)	2016–17	Rd. 10	Debut	24	1	0	0	4
220.	Tevita Pangai Junior	(Tonga)	2016–21	Rd. 12	Debut	96	14	0	0	56
221.	Jaydn Su'A	(Samoa)	2016–19	Rd. 12	Debut	31	1	0	0	4
222.	Tom Opacic	(Australia)	2016–18	Rd. 16	Debut	21	5	0	0	20
223.	Jonus Pearson	(Australia)	2016–18	Rd. 23	Debut	11	4	0	0	16
224.	Tautau Moga	(Samoa)	2017	Rd. 1	North Queensland Cowboys	27	10	0	0	40
225.	Korbin Sims	(Fiji)	2017–18	Rd. 1	Newcastle Knights	44	9	0	0	36
226.	Benji Marshall	(New Zealand)	2017	Rd. 3	St. George Illawarra Dragons	13	1	0	0	4
227.	David Mead	(Papua New Guinea)	2017, 2021	Rd. 6	Gold Coast Titans	24	8	0	0	32
228.	George Fai	(Australia)	2017–18	Rd. 12	Debut	2	0	0	0	0
229.	Jamayne Isaako	(New Zealand) (Samoa)	2017–22	Rd. 19	Debut	77	24	217	2	532
230.	Matthew Lodge	(Australia)	2018–21	Rd. 1	Wests Tigers	65	4	0	0	16
231.	Jack Bird	(Australia)	2018–19	Rd. 3	Cronulla Sharks	17	2	0	0	8
232.	Sam Tagataese	(Samoa)	2018	Rd. 6	Cronulla Sharks	4	0	0	0	0
233.	Payne Haas	(Australia) (Samoa)	2018–26	Rd. 8	Debut	159	16	0	0	64
234.	Patrick Mago	(Australia)	2018	Rd. 11	North Queensland Cowboys	12	0	0	0	0
235.	Kotoni Staggs	(Australia) (Tonga)	2018–	Rd. 11	Debut	166	73	75	0	442
236.	David Fifita	(Australia)	2018–20	Rd. 16	Debut	44	13	0	0	52
237.	Jake Turpin	(Australia)	2018–22	Rd. 17	Debut	60	4	0	0	16
238.	Gehamat Shibasaki	(Australia)	2018–19, 2025–26	Rd. 22	Debut	54	21	0	0	84
239.	Thomas Flegler	(Australia)	2019–23	Rd. 1	Debut	96	5	0	0	20
240.	Shaun Fensom	(Australia)	2019	Rd. 2	North Queensland Cowboys	2	0	0	0	0
241.	Patrick Carrigan	(Australia)	2019–	Rd. 5	Debut	148	5	0	0	20
242.	Tom Dearden	(Australia)	2019–21	Rd. 8	Debut	22	2	0	0	8
243.	James Segeyaro	(Papua New Guinea)	2019	Rd. 10	Cronulla Sharks	13	1	0	0	4
244.	Richard Kennar	(Samoa)	2019–21	Rd. 13	South Sydney Rabbitohs	14	3	0	0	12
245.	Sean O'Sullivan	(Australia)	2019–20	Rd. 14	Sydney Roosters	8	0	0	0	0
246.	Xavier Coates	(Papua New Guinea)	2019–21	Rd. 16	Debut	32	17	0	0	68
247.	Herbie Farnworth	(England)	2019–23	Rd. 16	Debut	79	34	14	0	164
248.	Rhys Kennedy	(Australia)	2019–22	Rd. 16	South Sydney Rabbitohs	47	3	0	0	12
249.	Keenan Palasia	(Australia)	2019–23	Rd. 16	Debut	53	1	0	0	4
250.	Izaia Perese	(Australia)	2019	Rd. 22	Debut	2	0	0	0	0
251.	Jesse Arthars	(New Zealand)	2020–21, 2023–26	Rd. 1	Gold Coast Titans	84	36	2	0	148
252.	Brodie Croft	(Australia)	2020–21	Rd. 1	Melbourne Storm	26	2	0	0	8
253.	Jamil Hopoate	(Australia)	2020	Rd. 1	Debut	12	0	0	0	0
254.	Ethan Bullemor	(Australia)	2020–21	Rd. 2	Debut	25	3	0	0	12
255.	Tesi Niu	(Tonga)	2020–22	Rd. 4	Debut	32	11	0	0	44
256.	Cory Paix	(Australia)	2020–	Rd. 4	Debut	85	9	0	0	36
257.	Issac Luke	(New Zealand)	2020	Rd. 6	St. George Illawarra Dragons	12	0	1	0	2
258.	Tyson Gamble	(Australia)	2020–22	Rd. 11	Wests Tigers	24	1	3	2	12
259.	Jordan Riki	(New Zealand)	2020–	Rd. 14	Debut	135	25	0	0	100
260.	John Asiata	(Samoa) (Tonga)	2021	Rd. 1	North Queensland Cowboys	10	1	0	0	4
261.	Danny Levi	(New Zealand) (Samoa)	2021	Rd. 7	Manly Sea Eagles	9	0	0	0	0
262.	Kobe Hetherington	(Australia)	2021–25	Rd. 11	Debut	105	6	0	0	24
263.	Albert Kelly	(Australia)	2021–22	Rd. 11	Hull F.C.	12	3	0	0	12
264.	TC Robati	(New Zealand)	2021–22	Rd. 12	Debut	17	2	0	0	8
265.	Selwyn Cobbo	(Australia)	2021–25	Rd. 13	Debut	83	49	5	0	206
266.	Xavier Willison	(New Zealand)	2021–	Rd. 20	Debut	75	17	0	0	68
267.	Brendan Piakura	(Australia)	2021–	Rd. 24	Debut	66	9	0	0	36
268.	Kurt Capewell	(Australia)	2022–23	Rd. 1	Penrith Panthers	43	11	0	1	45
269.	Ryan James	(Australia)	2022	Rd. 1	Canterbury Bulldogs	10	0	0	0	0
270.	Tyrone Roberts	(Australia)	2022	Rd. 1	Gold Coast Titans	2	0	0	0	0
271.	Billy Walters	(Australia)	2022–	Rd. 1	Wests Tigers	104	21	0	0	84
272.	Adam Reynolds	(Australia)	2022–26	Rd. 2	South Sydney Rabbitohs	92	19	309	6	702
273.	Corey Jensen	(Australia)	2022–26	Rd. 3	North Queensland Cowboys	95	2	0	0	8
274.	Brenko Lee	(Australia)	2022	Rd. 4	Melbourne Storm	8	1	0	0	4
275.	Delouise Hoeter	(Australia)	2022–27	Rd. 6	Wests Tigers	9	5	0	0	20
276.	Te Maire Martin	(New Zealand)	2022	Rd. 7	North Queensland Cowboys	13	1	0	0	4
277.	Ezra Mam	(Australia)	2022–	Rd. 11	Debut	91	48	0	0	192
278.	Jordan Pereira	(New Zealand)	2022–23	Rd. 14	St. George Illawarra Dragons	6	4	0	0	16
279.	Zac Hosking	(Australia)	2022	Rd. 17	Debut	4	0	0	0	0
280.	Deine Mariner	(Australia)	2022–	Rd. 20	Debut	64	38	0	0	152
281.	Martin Taupau	(New Zealand)	2023–25	Rd. 1	Manly Warringah Sea Eagles	34	1	0	0	4
282.	Reece Walsh	(Australia)	2023–	Rd. 2	New Zealand Warriors	73	43	67	1	307
283.	Jock Madden	(Australia)	2023–24	Rd. 9	Wests Tigers	15	2	5	1	19
284.	Tristan Sailor	(Australia)	2023–24	Rd. 13	St. George Illawarra Dragons	16	1	0	0	4
285.	Tyson Smoothy	(Australia)	2023–25	Rd. 15	Melbourne Storm	42	2	0	0	8
286.	Blake Mozer	(Australia)	2023–	Rd. 27	Debut	16	1	0	0	4
287.	Josh Rogers	(Australia)	2023–	Rd. 27	Debut	11	3	5	0	22
288.	Fletcher Baker	(Australia)	2024–25	Rd. 1	Sydney Roosters	14	0	0	0	0
289.	Jaiyden Hunt	(Australia)	2024–26	Rd. 4	St. George Illawarra Dragons	26	0	0	0	0
290.	Ben Te Kura	(Australia)	2024–27	Rd. 5	Debut	5	1	0	0	4
291.	Jack Gosiewski	(Australia)	2024–26	Rd. 10	North Queensland Cowboys	33	4	0	0	16
292.	Josiah Karapani	(New Zealand)	2024–	Rd. 11	Debut	44	19	0	0	76
293.	Ben Talty	(Australia)	2025–	Rd. 18	Debut	30	5	0	0	20
294.	Aublix Tawha	(New Zealand)	2026–	Rd. 1	Dolphins	9	0	0	0	0
295.	Grant Anderson	(Australia)	2026	Rd. 3	Melbourne Storm	12	4	0	0	16
296.	Antonio Verhoeven	(New Zealand)	2026–	Rd. 5	Debut	3	1	0	0	4
297.	Thomas Duffy	(Australia)	2026–	Rd. 6	North Queensland Cowboys	10	1	15	1	35
298.	Cameron Bukowski	(Australia)	2026–	Rd. 7	Debut	1	0	0	0	0
299.	Hayze Perham	(New Zealand)	2026–	Rd. 7	Canterbury Bulldogs	7	2	12	0	32
300.	Preston Riki	(New Zealand)	2026–	Rd. 8	Penrith Panthers	10	0	0	0	0
301.	Va'a Semu	(Australia)	2026–	Rd. 8	Debut	13	0	0	0	0
302.	Phillip Coates	(Australia) (Papua New Guinea)	2026–	Rd. 11	Debut	1	0	0	0	0
303.	Josh Coric	(Australia)	2026–	Rd. 18	Debut	1	0	0	0	0
304.	Luke Gale	(Australia)	2026–	Rd. 18	Debut	1	0	0	0	0

== Under 20s ==
As of Semi-Final 2017

The NRL Under-20s competition, known commercially as the Toyota Cup (2008–2012) and Holden Cup (2013–2017), served as the primary national youth pathway to first-grade rugby league. The competition was discontinued after 2017 and replaced by state-based pathways.

- Players are listed in debut order, with the first 17 correlating to the jersey numbers worn in the debut game in Round 1, 2008.
- Player numbers in this list are unofficial.

Key to list
Players who played NRL for Brisbane

No.	Name	Season/s	Debut	Position	Games	Tries	Goals	Field goals	Points	
1	Josh Hoffman	2008	Rd. 1	Fullback	25	12	0	0	48	
2	Daniel Tanswell	2008	Rd. 1	Wing	3	0	0	0	0	
3	Will Tupou	2008–2009	Rd. 1	Centre	25	8	0	0	32	
4	Alex Glenn	2008	Rd. 1	Lock	27	4	0	0	16	
5	Josh Williams	2008–2009	Rd. 1	Centre	22	10	0	0	40	
6	Gerard Beale	2008–2010	Rd. 1	Centre	31	9	0	0	36	
7	Ben Hunt	2008–2009	Rd. 1	Halfback	45	28	93	0	298	
8	Josh McGuire	2008–2010	Rd. 1	Prop	30	11	0	0	44	
9	Tom Butterfield	2008	Rd. 1	Hooker	16	10	0	0	40	
10	Mitchell Dodds	2008–2009	Rd. 1	Prop	43	4	0	0	16	
11	Matt Handcock	2008	Rd. 1	Second-row	27	4	0	0	16	
12	Michael Spence	2008	Rd. 1	Second-row	24	4	0	0	16	
13	Brendon Gibb	2008	Rd. 1	Centre	17	4	0	0	16	
14	Nathan Strudwick	2008	Rd. 1	–	2	1	0	0	4	
15	Troyden Watene	2008	Rd. 1	Second-row	21	8	3	0	38	
16	Dunamis Lui	2008–2010	Rd. 1	Second-row	64	10	0	0	40	
17	Wiremu Ratana	2008	Rd. 1	–	1	0	0	0	0	
18	Jharal Yow Yeh	2008–2009	Rd. 2	Wing	34	33	0	0	132	
19	Leon Panapa	2008	Rd. 2	Second-row	3	0	0	0	0	
20	Josh Coyle	2008–2009	Rd. 2	Prop	22	2	0	0	8	
21	Max Dudley	2008–2010	Rd. 3	Wing	12	3	0	0	12	
22	Jared Kahu	2008	Rd. 3	Five-eighth	24	5	52	0	124	
23	Guy Ford	2008–2009	Rd. 3	Lock	37	3	0	0	12	
24	Travis White	2008	Rd. 3	–	1	0	0	0	0	
25	Jacob Samoa	2008–2009	Rd. 3	Centre	19	3	0	0	12	
26	Tyson Andrews	2008–2009	Rd. 3	Prop	17	0	0	0	0	
27	Mitch Rivett	2008–2009	Rd. 4	Wing	22	8	0	0	32	
28	Andrew McCullough	2008–2009	Rd. 4	Hooker	21	12	0	0	48	
29	Jeremiah Walters	2008	Rd. 7	Second-row	16	0	0	0	0	
30	Patrick Fray	2008	Rd. 13	Centre	1	1	0	0	4	
31	Kerryn Blake	2008	Rd. 13	Halfback	1	0	0	0	0	
32	Brent Williams	2008–2009	Rd. 13	Centre	18	2	0	0	8	
33	Tariq Sims	2008–2010	Rd. 13	Prop	52	19	0	0	76	
34	Trent Williamson	2008	Rd. 13	–	1	0	0	0	0	
35	Matt Gillett	2008	Rd. 20	Second-row	7	0	0	0	0	
36	James Ackerman	2009–2010	–	Second-row	39	6	0	0	24	
37	Kurt Baptiste	2009–2011	–	Hooker	68	28	0	0	112	
38	Tyson Brookes	2009–2010	–	Wing	16	8	0	0	32	
39	Dale Copley	2009–2011	–	Centre	40	40	0	0	160	
40	Ben Faulkner	2009–2010	–	Lock	26	1	0	0	4	
41	Dane Gagai	2009–2011	–	Fullback	62	38	74	0	300	
42	David Hala	2009	–	Prop	25	10	0	0	40	
43	Joel Koina	2009	–	Centre	4	1	0	0	4	
44	Lyndon Law	2009–2010	–	Wing	2	0	0	0	0	
45	Rhyse Matsen	2009–2010	–	Centre	34	9	0	0	36	
46	Todd Murphy	2009–2010	–	Fullback	28	16	0	0	64	
47	Corey Norman	2009–2011	–	Five-eighth	51	17	73	0	214	
48	Chris Cook	2009	–	–	1	0	0	0	0	
49	Chris Mineham	2009	–	Wing	1	0	0	0	0	
50	Charlie Jones	2009	–	–	1	0	0	0	0	
51	Kurtis Lingwoodock	2009–2010	–	Second-row	30	6	0	0	24	
52	Jake Granville	2009	–	Hooker	7	1	0	0	4	
53	Komisi Umu	2009	–	Wing	3	2	0	0	8	
54	Jesse Mogg	2009	–	Wing	8	2	0	0	8	
55	Andrew Clayton	2010	–	Prop	24	1	0	0	4	
56	Tennyson Elliott	2010	–	Five-eighth	9	2	0	0	8	
57	Mitchell Frei	2010–2012	–	Second-row	50	11	63	0	170	
58	Louis Frisby	2010–2012	–	Halfback	45	13	23	0	98	
59	Ryan Hansen	2010	–	Second-row	21	2	0	0	8	
60	Jordan Kahu	2010–2011	–	Wing	23	11	2	0	48	
61	Benn Malley	2010–2012	–	Lock	57	3	0	0	12	
62	Lachlan Maranta	2010–2011	–	Wing	31	19	0	0	76	
63	Aaron Whitchurch	2010–2012	–	Centre	35	13	0	0	52	
64	Chris Binge	2010–2012	–	Lock	63	19	0	0	177	
65	Korbin Sims	2010	–	–	8	1	0	0	4	
66	Mboya Adams	2010–2011	–	–	18	0	0	0	0	
67	Waita Setu	2010–2011	–	Lock	10	0	0	0	0	
68	Bryce Hegarty	2010–2012	–	Five-eighth	34	19	38	0	152	
69	Jake Seaton	2010	–	–	8	1	0	0	4	
70	Daniel Alvaro	2011–2012	–	Prop	28	1	0	0	4	
71	Arthur Brown	2011	–	Wing	10	5	0	0	20	
72	Stephen Coombe	2011–2013	–	Prop	66	0	0	0	0	
73	Chris Kuridrani	2011	–	Wing	5	3	0	0	12	
74	Zac Lemberg	2011	–	–	3	0	0	0	0	
75	Anthony Mullally	2011	–	Prop	21	0	0	0	0	
76	Matt Smith	2011	–	Prop	22	1	0	0	4	
77	Daniel Wallace	2011	–	Second-row	24	7	39	0	106	
78	Jerome Leedy	2011–2012	–	Centre	12	8	0	0	32	
79	James Furminger	2011	–	Wing	3	0	0	0	0	
80	Cameron Cullen	2011–2013	–	Halfback	39	11	35	0	114	
81	Matthew Berwick	2011–2012	–	Centre	33	12	0	0	48	
82	Caleb Binge	2011	–	Second-row	4	0	0	0	0	
83	Joel Bailey	2011	–	Fullback	3	0	0	0	0	
84	Jake Ryalls	2011	–	–	2	1	0	0	4	
85	Jarrod Wallace	2011	–	Prop	16	7	0	0	28	
86	BJ Burgess	2011	–	Wing	4	0	0	0	0	
87	David Faamita	2011	–	Centre	11	7	0	0	28	
88	Rian Diffey	2011–2012	–	Wing	3	0	0	0	0	
89	Jake Kelly	2011	–	–	3	0	0	0	0	
90	Trent Richardson	2011	–	–	1	0	0	0	0	
91	Ajuma Adams	2012–2014	–	Second-row	68	10	0	0	40	
92	Brett Coutts	2012	–	Second-row	6	0	0	0	0	
93	Danny Levi	2012	–	Fullback	14	2	0	0	8	
94	Tristan Lumley	2012	–	Wing	24	15	0	0	60	
95	Kodi Nikorima	2012–2014	–	Fullback	73	38	9	0	170	
96	Travis Peeters	2012–2013	–	Prop	22	1	0	0	4	
97	Josh Seage	2012	–	–	9	2	0	0	8	
98	Caleb Timu	2012–2013	–	Second-row	48	33	0	0	132	
99	Jarrod Watson	2012	–	Wing	9	1	0	0	4	
100	Corey Oates	2012–2013	–	Centre	29	27	6	0	120	
101	Zach Koitka	2012	–	Centre	4	1	0	0	4	
102	Mitchell Moore	2012	–	Hooker	12	5	0	0	20	
103	Billy Brittain	2012	–	–	4	0	0	0	0	
104	Brandon Lee	2012–2014	–	Hooker	56	6	0	0	24	
105	Soape Palau	2012–2013	–	Centre	33	12	0	0	48	
106	Richie Tuala	2012	–	–	5	0	0	0	0	
107	Rhett Webster	2012	–	Wing	4	1	0	0	4	
108	Francis Molo	2012–2014	–	Prop	46	19	0	0	76	
109	Nathan Crowley	2012	–	–	1	0	0	0	0	
110	Che Fa'alafi	2012	–	Five-eighth	5	0	0	0	0	
111	Kurt Capewell	2012–2013	–	Fullback	18	9	4	0	44	
112	Jayden Berrell	2012–2015	–	Hooker	82	15	0	0	60	
113	Brett Greinke	2012–2014	–	Second-row	47	12	0	0	48	
114	Jai Arrow	2012–2015	–	Lock	74	12	0	0	48	
115	Paul Byrnes	2013–2015	–	Fullback	61	42	27	0	222	
116	Joseph Forrester	2013	–	Centre	9	2	0	0	8	
117	Benjamin Garcia	2013	–	Lock	13	2	0	0	8	
118	Joe Ofahengaue	2013–2015	–	Prop	58	7	0	0	28	
119	Tom Opacic	2013–2014	–	Wing	44	25	0	0	100	
120	Duncan Paia'aua	2013–2014	–	Five-eighth	38	13	62	0	176	
121	Jack Schaffer	2013	-	Wing	–	11	1	0	0	4
122	Aaron Rockley	2013–2014	–	Prop	38	3	0	0	12	
123	Ashley Taylor	2013–2015	–	Halfback	47	22	124	1	337	
124	Michael O'Keefe	2013	–	Centre	2	0	0	0	0	
125	Elijah Alick	2013–2016	–	Wing	34	10	0	0	40	
126	Jordan Drew	2013–2015	–	Centre	53	31	0	0	124	
127	Paul Schaffer	2013	–	Wing	1	0	0	0	0	
128	Harry Pondekas	2013	–	–	2	0	0	0	0	
129	Kalolo Saitaua	2013–2016	–	Hooker	50	25	0	0	100	
130	Sam Gee	2014–2015	–		27	1	0	0	4	
131	Brendon McBryde	2014–2015	–	Second-row	18	3	0	0	12	
132	Jayden Nikorima	2014–2015	–	Five-eighth	34	28	63	0	238	
133	Jack Tuttle	2014–2015	–	Centre	32	15	1	0	62	
134	Alex Barr	2014–2015	–	Second-row	48	12	0	0	48	
135	Junior Taefu	2014	–	Centre	8	1	0	0	4	
136	George Fai	2014–2016	–	Prop	37	2	0	0	8	
137	Will Brimson	2014–2016	–	Halfback	40	13	0	0	52	
138	Lindsay Collins	2014–2016	–	Prop	38	6	0	0	24	
139	Kieran Duffin	2014–2015	–	Lock	3	0	0	0	0	
140	Jarryd Dodd	2015	–	Centre	24	8	0	0	32	
141	Jacob Gagai	2015	-	Five-eighth	5	0	0	0	0	
142	Sam Lavea	2015–2016	–	Prop	27	3	0	0	12	
143	Jaydn Su'A	2015–2017	–	Second-row	40	6	0	0	24	
144	Nikau Te Rupe	2015–2016	–	Wing	24	12	0	0	48	
145	Tim Wolens	2015	–	Prop	4	1	0	0	4	
146	Keegan Hipgrave	2015–2017	–	Prop	39	10	0	0	40	
147	Jonus Pearson	2015	–	Wing	13	14	0	0	56	
148	Logan Spaander	2015–2016	–	Five-eighth	9	2	0	0	8	
149	Lachlan Lanskey	2015–2017	–	Second-row	38	8	0	0	32	
150	Sam Leach	2015–2016	–	Centre	18	2	0	0	8	
151	Michael Molo	2015–2016	–	Lock	29	3	0	0	12	
152	Hiale Slade-Roycroft	2015	–	–	3	0	0	0	0	
153	Daniel Russell	2015	–	Wing	7	0	0	0	0	
154	Josh Bowen-Bowyer	2015	–	Fullback	3	2	0	0	8	
155	Keenan Palasia	2015–2017	–	Second-row	20	5	0	0	20	
156	Corey Allan	2016–2017	Rd. 1	Fullback	47	15	0	0	60	
157	David Fauid	2016–2017	Rd. 1	Wing	42	24	0	0	96	
158	Gehamat Shibasaki	2016–2017	Rd. 1	Centre	46	24	0	0	96	
159	Sam Smith	2016	Rd. 1	Wing	22	8	0	0	32	
160	Haydyn O'Hara	2016–2017	Rd. 1	Five-eighth	26	7	26	0	80	
161	Tristan Hope	2016–2017	Rd. 1	Hooker	38	15	0	0	60	
162	Josh Rudolph	2016	Rd. 1	Second-row	21	7	0	0	28	
163	Max Elliott	2016	Rd. 1	Prop	24	1	0	0	4	
164	Tevita Pangai Junior	2016	Rd. 1	Prop	6	2	0	0	8	
165	Sam Elliott	2016–2017	Rd. 3	Prop	40	5	0	0	20	
166	Jai Whitbread	2016–2017	Rd. 4	Prop	44	4	0	0	16	
167	Patrick Carrigan	2016–2017	Rd. 7	Lock	38	3	0	0	12	
168	Jamayne Isaako	2016	Rd. 9	Five-eighth	13	10	46	0	132	
169	Gerome Burns	2016–2017	Rd. 11	Halfback	35	20	93	0	266	
170	Lachlan Barr	2016–2017	Rd. 12	–	6	0	0	0	0	
171	Dale Madden	2016	Rd. 16	–	4	1	0	0	4	
172	Kotoni Staggs	2017	Rd. 1	Centre	25	12	23	0	94	
173	Steven Tatipata	2017	Rd. 1	Centre	4	1	0	0	4	
174	Julian Christian	2017	Rd. 1	Five-eighth	9	2	0	0	8	
175	Brent Woolf	2017	Rd. 1	Hooker	9	2	0	0	8	
176	Payne Haas	2017	Rd. 1	Prop	18	9	0	0	36	
177	Thomas Flegler	2017	Rd. 1	Prop	6	0	0	0	0	
178	Brandon Russell	2017	Rd. 1	Second-row	18	4	0	0	16	
179	Herbie Farnworth	2017	Rd. 2	Wing	17	8	0	0	32	
180	Cameron Torpy	2017	Rd. 2	–	1	0	0	0	0	
181	Eddie Blacker	2017	Rd. 2	Prop	9	2	0	0	8	
182	Thane Kellermeyer	2017	Rd. 4	Wing	13	3	0	0	12	
183	Joshua Fauid	2017	Rd. 4	Five-eighth	13	6	0	0	24	
184	Kobe Hetherington	2017	Rd. 5	Hooker	5	1	0	0	4	
185	Clayton Mack	2017	Rd. 7	Centre	9	0	0	0	0	
186	Tyson Smoothy	2017	Rd. 8	Hooker	18	1	1	0	6	
187	Brayden Dee	2017	Rd. 8	Lock	4	0	0	0	0	
188	Mitipere Tuatai	2017	Rd. 9	–	2	0	0	0	0	
189	Rory Ferguson	2017	Rd. 10	Lock	13	1	0	0	4	
190	Kalemb Hart	2017	Rd. 11	Wing	1	0	0	0	0	
191	Edward Burns	2017	Rd. 12	Second-row	15	1	0	0	4	
192	Dray Ngatuere-Wroe	2017	Rd. 16	Halfback	12	1	0	0	4	

== Women ==
As of Grand Final of the 2026 NRL Women's season

The Brisbane Broncos Women have competed in the NRL Women's Premiership (NRLW) since the competition’s inaugural season in 2018. The team has been one of the most successful in the league, winning multiple premierships.

Cap No.	Name	Nationality	Career span	Debut round	Previous club	Appearances	Tries	Goals	Field goals	Points
1.	Chelsea Baker	(Australia)	2018–19	Rd. 1	Debut	7	2	18	0	44
2.	Julia Robinson	(Australia)	2018–	Rd. 1	Debut	60	40	0	0	160
3.	Amelia Kuk	(Papua New Guinea) (Australia)	2018	Rd. 1	Debut	2	0	0	0	0
4.	Amber Pilley	(Australia)	2018–19	Rd. 1	Debut	8	2	0	0	8
5.	Meg Ward	(Australia)	2018–20	Rd. 1	Debut	10	3	18	0	48
6.	Kimiora Breayley-Nati	(Cook Islands) (New Zealand)	2018	Rd. 1	Debut	4	3	0	0	12
7.	Ali Brigginshaw	(Australia)	2018–	Rd. 1	Debut	67	14	36	0	128
8.	Heather Ballinger	(Australia)	2018	Rd. 1	Debut	4	1	0	0	4
9.	Brittany Breayley-Nati	(Australia)	2018	Rd. 1	Debut	4	1	0	0	4
10.	Stephanie Hancock	(Australia)	2018–19	Rd. 1	Debut	8	0	0	0	0
11.	Teuila Fotu-Moala	(New Zealand)	2018	Rd. 1	Debut	4	1	0	0	4
12.	Maitua Feterika	(New Zealand)	2018	Rd. 1	Debut	4	1	0	0	4
13.	Rona Peters	(New Zealand)	2018–19	Rd. 1	Debut	8	3	0	0	12
14.	Lavinia Gould	(New Zealand)	2018–24	Rd. 1	Debut	30	3	0	0	12
15.	Chelsea Lenarduzzi	(Australia)	2018–	Rd. 1	Debut	69	22	0	0	88
16.	Mariah Denman	(Australia)	2018-19, 2023-24	Rd. 1	Debut	23	1	6	0	16
17.	Ngatokotoru Arakua	(New Zealand)	2018	Rd. 1	Debut	4	2	0	0	8
18.	Karley Te Kawa	(New Zealand)	2018	Rd. 2	Debut	2	1	0	0	4
19.	Kody House	(Australia)	2018	Rd. 3	Debut	1	1	0	0	4
20.	Tallisha Harden	(Australia)	2018, 2020-22	Rd. 3	Debut	15	2	0	0	8
21.	Tamika Upton	(Australia)	2019-21, 2025–	Rd. 1	Debut	38	42	0	0	168
22.	Amy Turner	(Australia) (New Zealand)	2019, 2021-22	Rd. 1	Debut	13	3	0	0	12
23.	Raecene McGregor	(New Zealand)	2019–20	Rd. 1	St. George Illawarra Dragons	8	1	0	0	4
24.	Millie Elliott	(Australia)	2019–21	Rd. 1	Debut	13	4	0	0	16
25.	Amber Hall	(New Zealand)	2019–22	Rd. 1	Debut	18	4	0	0	16
26.	Annette Brander	(Australia)	2019–20	Rd. 1	St. George Illawarra Dragons	8	1	0	0	4
27.	Tazmin Rapana	(Australia)	2019, 2023-24	Rd. 1	Sydney Roosters	21	5	0	0	20
28.	Tarryn Aiken	(Australia)	2019–22	Rd. 1	Debut	19	6	1	0	26
29.	Jessika Elliston	(Australia)	2019–20	Rd. 1	Debut	5	0	0	0	0
30.	Lauren Brown	(Australia)	2020–21	Rd. 1	Debut	10	1	19	0	42
31.	Jayme Fressard	(Australia)	2020	Rd. 1	Debut	3	0	0	0	0
32.	Shannon Mato	(Australia)	2020, 2026–	Rd. 1	Debut	18	1	0	0	4
33.	Tyler Birch	(New Zealand)	2020	Rd. 1	Debut	2	0	0	0	0
34.	Shenae Ciesiolka	(Australia)	2020–25	Rd. 2	Debut	40	17	0	0	68
35.	Romy Teitzel	(Australia)	2020, 2023–	Rd. 3	Debut	47	12	74	0	196
36.	Chanté Temara	(Australia)	2020	Rd. 3	Debut	2	0	0	0	0
37.	Emily Bass	(Australia)	2021–22	Rd. 1	Debut	7	4	0	0	16
38.	Nakita Sao	(New Zealand)	2021	Rd. 1	Debut	1	0	0	0	0
39.	Kaitlyn Phillips	(Australia)	2021–22	Rd. 1	Sydney Roosters	7	1	0	0	4
40.	Roxy Murdoch-Masila	(New Zealand)	2021	Rd. 1	Warrington Wolves	6	1	0	0	4
41.	Sara Sautia	(New Zealand)	2021–22	Rd. 1	Debut	9	0	0	0	0
42.	Jada Ferguson	(Australia)	2021–	Rd. 1	Debut	52	9	0	0	36
43.	Hagiga Mosby	(Australia)	2021	Rd. 2	Debut	4	4	0	0	16
44.	Hayley Maddick	(Australia)	2021–25	Rd. 2	Debut	42	14	0	0	56
45.	Toni Hunt	(New Zealand)	2021, 2023	Rd. 3	Debut	3	1	0	0	4
46.	China Polata	(Tonga)	2021	Rd. 4	Debut	1	0	0	0	0
47.	Lesa Kaleti Mataafa	(New Zealand)	2021	Rd. 4	Debut	0	0	0	0	0
48.	Jaime Chapman	(Australia)	2022	Rd. 1	St. George Illawarra Dragons	5	4	0	0	16
49.	Sophie Holyman	(Australia)	2022	Rd. 1	Debut	5	0	0	0	0
50.	Nita Maynard-Perrin	(Australia) (New Zealand)	2022	Rd. 1	Parramatta Eels	3	0	0	0	0
51.	Crystal Tamarua	(Cook Islands) (New Zealand)	2022	Rd. 1	New Zealand Warriors	2	0	0	0	0
52.	Jasmine Solia	(Australia)	2022–24	Rd. 1	Debut	14	0	0	0	0
53.	Brianna Clark	(Australia) (New Zealand)	2022–	Rd. 2	Gold Coast Titans	43	4	9	0	34
54.	Shakiah Tungai	(Australia)	2022	Rd. 3	St. George Illawarra Dragons	2	0	0	0	0
55.	Hannah Larsson	(Australia)	2022	Rd. 3	Debut	3	0	0	0	0
56.	Annetta Nu'uausala	(New Zealand)	2022–25	Rd. 4	Newcastle Knights	26	3	0	0	12
57.	Mele Hufanga	(Tonga) (New Zealand)	2023–25	Rd. 1	Debut	33	25	0	0	100
58.	Ashleigh Werner	(Australia)	2023	Rd. 1	Debut	7	2	0	0	8
59.	Gayle Broughton	(New Zealand)	2023–25	Rd. 1	Parramatta Eels	29	8	0	0	32
60.	Destiny Brill	(Australia)	2023–	Rd. 1	Sydney Roosters	31	8	0	0	32
61.	Filomina Hanisi	(Australia)	2023	Rd. 1	Parramatta Eels	4	0	0	0	0
62.	Breanna Eales	(Australia)	2023	Rd. 1	Debut	4	0	0	0	0
63.	Lauren Dam	(Australia)	2023–	Rd. 1	Gold Coast Titans	42	20	0	0	80
64.	Grace Griffin	(Australia)	2023	Rd. 4	Debut	2	0	0	0	0
65.	Tafito Lafaele	(New Zealand)	2023–25	Rd. 6	Debut	14	1	0	0	4
66.	Bree Spreadborough	(Australia)	2024–	Rd. 1	Debut	19	2	0	0	8
67.	Skyla Adams	(Australia) (New Zealand)	2024–25	Rd. 1	Debut	3	0	0	0	0
68.	Keilee Joseph	(Australia)	2024–25	Rd. 1	Sydney Roosters	23	1	0	0	4
69.	Bridget Hoy	(Australia)	2024	Rd. 2	Debut	1	0	0	0	0
70.	Stacey Waaka	(New Zealand)	2024	Rd. 3	Debut	6	6	0	0	24
71.	Kerri Johnson	(Australia)	2025–	Rd. 1	Debut	26	21	0	0	84
72.	Tara McGrath-West	(Australia)	2025–	Rd. 1	St. George Illawarra Dragons	4	0	0	0	0
73.	Shalom Sauaso	(Samoa)	2025	Rd. 1	Debut	10	5	0	0	20
74.	Reegan Hicks	(Australia)	2025–	Rd. 2	Debut	11	0	0	0	0
75.	Azalleyah Maaka	(New Zealand)	2025	Rd. 10	Debut	2	0	0	0	0
76.	Georgia Bartlett	(Australia)	2026–	Rd. 1	Debut	14	6	0	0	24
77.	Caitlin Urwin	(Australia)	2026–	Rd. 1	Debut	8	2	0	0	8
78.	Jesse Southwell	(Australia)	2026–	Rd. 1	Newcastle Knights	14	2	56	0	120
79.	Lillian Yarrow	(Australia)	2026–	Rd. 1	North Queensland Cowboys	13	0	0	0	0
80.	Rhemy Hinckesman	(Australia)	2026–	Rd. 1	Debut	12	2	0	0	8
81.	Harlem Walker	(Australia)	2026–	Rd. 1	Debut	10	2	0	0	8
82.	Deleni Paitai	(Australia)	2026–	Rd. 3	Debut	11	2	0	0	8
83.	Tavarna Papalii	(Samoa)	2026–	Rd. 10	Sydney Roosters	1	0	0	0	0

== See also ==
- List of National Rugby League records

== Sources ==
- "The Encyclopedia of Rugby League Players: Every Brisbane Broncos Player Ever" By Alan Whiticker & Glen Hudson. Published by Bas Publishing, 2005.
- "Rugby League Project" website - http://www.rugbyleagueproject.org/
