= 1989 Brisbane Broncos season =

Coordinates: 27°27′53″S 153°0′34″E

- NSWRL rank: 5th
- Play-off result: Lost play-off decider (Cronulla Sharks, 14–38)
- 1989 record: Wins: 14; draws: 0; losses: 9
- Points scored: For: 398; against: 290

Team information
- CEO: John Ribot
- Coach: Wayne Bennett
- Captain: Wally Lewis
- Stadium: Lang Park
- Avg. attendance: 18,217
- High attendance: 33,245 (Parramatta Eels, 20 August)

Top scorers
- Tries: Chris Johns (10)
- Goals: Terry Matterson (42)
- Points: Terry Matterson (104)
← 1988	List of seasons	1990 →

The 1989 Brisbane Broncos season was the second in the club's history. They competed in the NSWRL's 1989 Winfield Cup premiership and in their second year improved on their first, finishing the season in sixth position after losing their first ever play-off match against the Cronulla-Sutherland Sharks. The Broncos did however claim their first piece of silverware by winning the mid-week knock-out 1989 Panasonic Cup competition.

Broncos trio Allan Langer, Michael Hancock and Kerrod Walters were selected to make their international debuts for Australia in 1989.

== Season summary ==
Coach Wayne Bennett said a mid-season 1989 Kangaroo Tour of New Zealand contributed to the Broncos failing to reach the finals. Brisbane contributed captain Wally Lewis, Tony Currie, Peter Jackson, Michael Hancock, Kerrod Walters and Sam Backo - more players than any other club - to the successful Australian team, losing all three of their matches while they were away.

== Match results ==
Round	Opponent	Result	Bro.	Opp.	Date	Venue	Crowd	Position	Ref
PC (1)	Canberra Raiders	Win	18	13	1 Mar	Pioneer Oval			
1	Penrith Panthers	Win	28	8	19 Mar	Lang Park	14,721	1/16	
2	Manly Sea Eagles	Win	22	18	26 Mar	Brookvale Oval	17,736	2/16	
3	Balmain Tigers	Loss	6	15	2 Apr	Lang Park	12,952	5/16	
4	Western Suburbs Magpies	Win	10	8	9 Apr	Campbelltown	5,755	3/16	
5	Newcastle Knights	Win	24	12	15 Apr	Lang Park	13,080	1/16	
6	Parramatta Eels	Win	6	2	23 Apr	Parramatta	17,006	2/16	
7	North Sydney Bears	Win	36	10	30 Apr	North Sydney	8,390	2/16	
8	Illawarra Steelers	Win	32	24	7 May	Lang Park	12,990	2/16	
9	Eastern Suburbs	Win	36	2	14 May	SFS	7,426	1/16	
PC (1/4)	Parramatta Eels	Win	42	6	17 May	Townsville Sports Centre		1/16	
10*	Gold Coast-Tweed Giants	Win	16	2	28 May	Lang Park	19.992	1/16	
PC (1/2)	South Sydney Rabbitohs	Win	24	4	31 May	Bathurst		1/16	
11	St George Dragons	Loss	10	20	4 Jun	Kogarah Oval	6,691	2/16	
PC (F)	Illawarra Steelers	Win	22	20	7 Jun	Parramatta Stadium	16,698	2/16	
12*	Canberra Raiders	Loss	6	27	18 Jun	Seiffert Oval	18,272	3/16	
13	Cronulla Sharks	Win	42	10	24 Jun	Lang Park	17,895	3/16	
14*	Canterbury Bulldogs	Loss	8	22	1 Jul	Belmore	9,185	3/16	
15	South Sydney Rabbitohs	Loss	8	20	9 Jul	Lang Park	21,388	3/16	
16	Penrith Panthers	Loss	8	18	16 Jul	Penrith	10,981	3/16	
17	Manly Sea Eagles	Loss	8	16	21 Jul	Lang Park	16,100	4/16	
18	Balmain Tigers	Loss	6	24	30 Jul	Leichhardt Oval	16,927	7/16	
19	Western Suburbs Magpies	Win	20	8	6 Aug	Lang Park	19,524	6/16	
20	Newcastle Knights	Win	20	16	13 Aug	Newcastle ISC	27,000	6/16	
21	Parramatta Eels	Win	16	8	20 Aug	Lang Park	33,245	5/16	
22	North Sydney Bears	Win	30	0	26 Aug	Lang Park	18,496	5/16	
Play-off for 5th	Cronulla Sharks	Loss	14	38	29 Aug	Parramatta	9,047	6/16	

* Game following a State of Origin match

== Ladder ==
	Team	Pld	W	D	L	PF	PA	PD	Pts
1	South Sydney Rabbitohs	22	18	1	3	390	207	+183	37
2	Penrith Panthers	22	16	0	6	438	241	+197	32
3	Balmain Tigers	22	14	1	7	380	236	+144	29
4	Canberra Raiders	22	14	0	8	457	287	+170	28
5	Brisbane Broncos	22	14	0	8	398	290	+108	28
6	Cronulla-Sutherland Sharks	22	14	0	8	368	281	+87	28
7	Newcastle Knights	22	11	0	11	281	281	0	22
8	Parramatta Eels	22	11	0	11	346	366	-20	22
9	Canterbury-Bankstown Bulldogs	22	10	2	10	280	337	-57	22
10	St. George Dragons	22	10	0	12	330	356	-26	20
11	Eastern Suburbs Roosters	22	9	1	12	348	346	+2	19
12	Manly-Warringah Sea Eagles	22	9	1	12	334	343	-9	19
13	Western Suburbs Magpies	22	7	1	14	229	389	-160	15
14	Gold Coast-Tweed Giants	22	7	1	14	223	383	-160	15
15	North Sydney Bears	22	5	1	16	194	406	-212	11
16	Illawarra Steelers	22	2	1	19	256	503	-247	5

== Squad ==
Brisbane Broncos 1989 Squad
First team squad			Coaching staff
Sam Backo – PR; Greg Conescu – HK; Tony Currie – CE; James Donnelly – PR; Greg Dowling – PR; Shane Duffy – FB; Gary French – HB; Keith Gee – SR; Ken Gittins – WG; Grant Graving – FB; Michael Hancock – WG	Ray Herring – HK; Mark Hohn – PR; Peter Jackson – CE; Chris Johns – CE; Brook Kennedy – LK; Joe Kilroy – WG; Allan Langer – HB; Brett Le Man – SR; Wally Lewis (c) – FE; Terry Matterson – LK; Gene Miles – SR	Bryan Niebling – PR; Brett Plowman – WG; Steve Renouf – WG; Grant Rix – FB; Craig Teevan – CE; Rohan Teevan – WG; Brad Tessmann – PR; Grant Thorogood – WG; Scott Tronc – PR; Kerrod Walters – HK	Head coach: Wayne Bennett; Legend: (c) Captain(s); (vc) Vice-captain(s)

== Awards ==
=== League ===
nil

=== Club ===
- Player of the year: Greg Dowling
- Rookie of the year: Michael Hancock
- Forward of the year: Greg Dowling
- Back of the year: Tony Currie
- Clubman of the year: Tony Currie

== Scorers ==
Player	Tries	Goals	FG	Points
Terry Matterson	5	42/64	0	104
Michael Hancock	9	2/4	0	40
Chris Johns	10	0	0	40
Tony Currie	8	0	0	32
Gary French	2	10/19	0	28
Joe Kilroy	6	0	0	24
Wally Lewis	4	2/8	0	20
Allan Langer	5	0	0	20
Brett Plowman	5	0	0	20
Sam Backo	3	0	0	12
Brett Le Man	3	0	0	12
Gene Miles	3	0	0	12
James Donnelly	2	0	0	8
Grant Graving	2	0	0	8
Peter Jackson	2	0	0	8
Bryan Neibling	2	0	0	8
Rohan Teevan	2	0	0	8
Greg Conescu	1	0	0	4
Greg Dowling	1	0	0	4
