= 1988 Brisbane Broncos season =

Coordinates: 27°27′53″S 153°0′34″E

- NSWRL rank: 7th
- Play-off result: Did not qualify
- 1988 record: Wins: 10; draws: 0; losses: 8
- Points scored: For: 474; against: 368

Team information
- CEO: John Ribot
- Coach: Wayne Bennett
- Captain: Wally Lewis
- Stadium: Lang Park
- Avg. attendance: 15,071

Top scorers
- Tries: Wally Lewis
- Goals: Terry Matterson
- Points: Terry Matterson
List of seasons	1989 →

The 1988 Brisbane Broncos season was the first in the club's history. The new venture team was added, along with the Newcastle Knights and Gold Coast-Tweed Giants to the New South Wales Rugby League's 1988 Winfield Cup premiership, coached by previous season grand final co-coach Wayne Bennett and captained by Australian national skipper Wally Lewis. Despite a strong start to the season, Brisbane failed to make the finals. During the season the Broncos also competed in the 1988 Panasonic Cup.

== Season summary ==
The same year Brisbane hosted World Expo 88, the Brisbane Broncos joined the New South Wales Rugby League premiership, making their debut on 6 March at Lang Park in Brisbane. The brand-new club which featured many Queensland-based international and state representatives, defeated the 1987 Winfield Cup Premiers Manly-Warringah 44-10 in their first premiership game. Brett Le Man scored the Broncos' first ever try from the scraps of a Craig Grauf bomb.

Although the Broncos won their first six games in their inaugural season, a midseason slump cost the club a debut finals appearance, finishing the season in seventh position. The Broncos also competed in the mid-week knockout competition, the 1988 Panasonic Cup, losing in the first round while they were still yet to lose a Winfield Cup match.

== Match results ==
Round	Opponent	Result	Bro.	Opp.	Date	Venue	Crowd	Ref
Trial	Canberra Raiders	Win	22	16		Lang Park	10,000+	
Trial	New Zealand President's XIII	Win	38	6	27 Feb		8,324	
1	Manly-Warringah Sea Eagles	Win	44	10	6 Mar	Lang Park	17,451	
2	Penrith Panthers	Win	20	18	12 Mar	Lang Park	13,621	
3	Western Suburbs Magpies	Win	38	4	20 Mar	Campbelltown	10,112	
4	North Sydney Bears	Win	24	12	27 Mar	North Sydney	9,329	
5	Parramatta Eels	Win	24	18	3 Apr	Lang Park	23,202	
PC	Penrith Panthers	Loss	10	24	6 Apr	Parramatta Stadium		
6	Newcastle Knights	Win	24	10	10 Apr	Newcastle ISC	30,220	
7	Balmain Tigers	Loss	18	26	16 Apr	Lang Park	18,434	
8	Cronulla-Sutherland Sharks	Loss	8	38	23 Apr	Endeavour	10,115	
9	Sydney Roosters	Win	24	20	1 May	Lang Park	16,489	
10	Gold Coast-Tweed Giants	Loss	22	25	8 May	Seagulls	13,432	
11*	Canberra Raiders	Loss	16	36	22 May	Lang Park	15,909	
12*	Illawarra Steelers	Win	32	10	5 Jun	Wollongong	9,738	
13	St. George Dragons	Win	26	22	13 Jun	Lang Park	19,954	
14	South Sydney Rabbitohs	Loss	4	16	17 Jun	SFS	10,871	
15*	Canterbury Bulldogs	Loss	10	25	26 Jun	Lang Park	15,371	
16	Manly-Warringah Sea Eagles	Win	28	10	3 Jul	Brookvale Oval	17,193	
17	Penrith Panthers	Win	8	6	10 Jul	Penrith Park	17,106	
18	Western Suburbs Magpies	Win	32	6	16 Jul	Lang Park	11,419	
19	North Sydney Bears	Win	24	6	23 Jul	Lang Park	11,452	
20	Parramatta Eels	Loss	14	22	31 Jul	Parramatta	13,190	
21	Newcastle Knights	Win	24	8	6 Aug	Lang Park	13,919	
22	Balmain Tigers	Loss	10	20	13 Aug	Leichhardt Oval	13,015	

- Game following a State of Origin match

== Ladder ==
	Team	Pld	W	D	L	PF	PA	PD	Pts
1	Cronulla-Sutherland	22	16	2	4	507	330	+177	34
2	Canterbury-Bankstown	22	16	0	6	412	268	+144	32
3	Canberra	22	15	0	7	596	346	+250	30
4	Manly-Warringah	22	15	0	7	538	347	+191	30
5	Penrith	22	15	0	7	394	258	+136	30
6	Balmain	22	15	0	7	402	341	+61	30
7	Brisbane Broncos	22	14	0	8	474	368	+106	28
8	South Sydney	22	12	2	8	425	383	+42	24
9	North Sydney	22	9	2	11	366	424	-58	20
10	St. George	22	9	0	13	352	493	-141	18
11	Parramatta	22	8	0	14	359	412	-53	16
12	Eastern Suburbs	22	6	3	13	387	443	-56	15
13	Illawarra	22	6	1	15	353	510	-157	13
14	Newcastle Knights	22	5	1	16	270	460	-190	11
15	Gold Coast-Tweed Giants	22	4	2	16	238	484	-246	10
16	Western Suburbs	22	4	1	17	287	493	-206	9

== Squad ==
Brisbane Broncos 1988 Squad
First team squad			Coaching staff
Peter Benson – WG; David Bourke – FB; Greg Conescu – HK; Greg Dowling – PR; Shane Duffy – FB; Gary French – FE; Keith Gee – SR; Craig Grauf – HB; Michael Hancock – WG; Ray Herring – HK; Mark Hohn – PR	Chris Johns – CE; Brook Kennedy – LK; Joe Kilroy – WG; Allan Langer – HB; Brett Le Man – SR; Wally Lewis (c) – FE; Terry Matterson – LK; Mark Meskell – WG; Gene Miles – SR; Bryan Niebling – PR	Billy Noke – SR; Brett Plowman – CE; Grant Rix – CE; Colin Scott – FB; Peter Sinclair; Craig Teevan – CE; Rohan Teevan – CE; Andrew Tessmann – PR; Brad Tessmann – PR; Kerrod Walters – HK	Head coach: Wayne Bennett; Legend: (c) Captain(s); (vc) Vice-captain(s)

== Awards ==
=== League ===
nil

=== Club ===
- Player of the year: Allan Langer
- Rookie of the year: Shane Duffy / Kerrod Walters
- Forward of the year: Terry Matterson
- Back of the year: Wally Lewis
- Clubman of the year: Greg Conescu
