= 1990 Brisbane Broncos season =

Coordinates: 27°27′53″S 153°0′34″E

Seasons
- 1989 1991

The 1990 Brisbane Broncos season was the third in the club's history. They competed in the NSWRL's 1990 Winfield Cup premiership and again improved on their previous year, finishing the regular season in second position before going on to come within one match of the grand final, but losing to eventual premiers, the Canberra Raiders.

Broncos players Chris Johns and Kevin Walters were selected to make their international débuts for the Australia national rugby league team in 1990.

== Season summary ==
The Broncos had some new faces for 1990 season, including Kevin Walters who was lured home from Canberra. In order to increase the Broncos' success in the Winfield Cup, Wayne Bennett controversially sacked Wally Lewis as club captain and gave the role to centre Gene Miles. Miles had retired from representative football, and Bennett hoped he could remove the team's reliance on Lewis.

The Balmian Tigers were the last team unbeaten by the Broncos until their victory in Round 18 of the 1990 season. Brisbane finished the regular season in second position, qualifying for their first finals campaign. In the Preliminary Final against the Canberra Raiders the Broncos were knocked out 30-2 so finished the 1990 season in third place. Canberra then went on to win the competition. At the end of the season, Wally Lewis parted company with the Broncos, moving to the Gold Coast Seagulls.

== Match results ==
Round	Opponent	Result	Bro.	Opp.	Date	Venue	Crowd	Position
1	Western Suburbs Magpies	Draw	12	12	18 Mar	Campbelltown Sports Ground	9,670	8/16
2	Parramatta Eels	Win	28	8	23 Mar	Lang Park	22,003	4/16
3	Balmain Tigers	Loss	16	18	1 Apr	Leichhardt Oval	13,062	9/16
4	Manly Sea Eagles	Win	14	12	8 Apr	Lang Park	21,807	4/16
5	Penrith Panthers	Loss	18	26	14 Apr	Lang Park	22,842	8/16
6	Newcastle Knights	Win	28	4	22 Apr	Newcastle ISC	23,195	7/16
7	North Sydney Bears	Loss	12	14	27 Apr	Lang Park	20,801	9/16
8*	Eastern Suburbs Roosters	Win	36	12	13 May	Sydney Football Stadium	5,794	6/16
9	Cronulla Sharks	Win	20	8	18 May	Lang Park	21,393	5/16
10*	Gold Coast-Tweed Giants	Win	30	14	3 Jun	Lang Park	17,680	4/16
11	South Sydney Rabbitohs	Win	34	6	10 Jun	Sydney Football Stadium	10,059	2/16
12*	Illawarra Steelers	Win	36	6	17 Jun	Lang Park	18,789	2/16
13	St George Dragons	Win	18	14	23 Jun	Kogarah Oval	8,187	2/16
14	Canberra Raiders	Win	22	20	1 Jul	Lang Park	32,124	1/16
15	Canterbury Bulldogs	Win	26	8	6 Jul	Belmore Oval	7,202	1/16
16	Western Suburbs Magpies	Win	30	10	13 Jul	Lang Park	15,906	1/16
17	Parramatta Eels	Win	24	22	22 Jul	Parramatta Stadium	20,138	1/16
18	Balmain Tigers	Win	30	16	29 Jul	Lang Park	32,168	1/16
19	Manly Sea Eagles	Loss	4	18	5 Aug	Brookvale Oval	16,656	1/16
20	Penrith Panthers	Loss	2	18	12 Aug	Penrith Football Stadium	15,000	2/16
21	Newcastle Knights	Win	24	4	17 Aug	Lang Park	24,282	2/16
22	North Sydney Bears	Win	14	8	25 Aug	North Sydney Oval	24,282	2/16
Qualif. Final	Penrith Panthers	Loss	16	26	2 Sep	Sydney Football Stadium	24,409	
Semi Final	Manly Sea Eagles	Win	12	4	8 Sep	Sydney Football Stadium	31,424	
Prelim. Final	Canberra Raiders	Loss	4	32	16 Sep	Sydney Football Stadium	31,628	

- Game following a State of Origin match

== Ladder ==
	Team	Pld	W	D	L	PF	PA	PD	Pts
1	Canberra Raiders	22	16	1	5	532	245	+287	33
2	Brisbane Broncos	22	16	1	5	478	278	+200	33
3	Penrith	22	15	1	6	415	286	+129	31
4	Manly-Warringah	22	15	0	7	395	255	+125	30
5	Balmain	22	14	0	8	432	284	+148	28
6	Newcastle Knights	22	13	2	7	344	305	+39	28
7	Canterbury-Bankstown	22	12	1	9	354	291	+65	25
8	Parramatta	22	12	1	9	387	347	+40	25
9	Illawarra	22	11	1	10	366	361	+5	23
10	Cronulla-Sutherland	22	11	0	11	370	359	+11	22
11	North Sydney	22	10	0	12	322	298	+24	20
12	St. George	22	8	0	14	371	399	-28	16
13	Western Suburbs	22	6	1	15	323	433	-110	13
14	Eastern Suburbs	22	6	1	15	283	547	-264	13
15	Gold Coast Seagulls	22	4	0	18	233	567	-334	8
16	South Sydney	22	2	0	20	302	652	-350	4

== Scorers ==
Player	Tries	Goals	FG	Points
Dale Shearer	10	46/83	0	132
Willie Carne	15	3/4	0	66
Terry Matterson	3	23/38	0	58
Paul Hauff	11	0	0	44
Chris Johns	8	0	0	32
Allan Langer	6	0	0	24
Michael Hancock	5	0	0	20
Gene Miles	5	0	0	20
Kevin Walters	5	0	0	20
Brett Plowman	4	0	0	16
Kerrod Walters	4	0	0	16
Tony Currie	3	0	0	12
Peter Jackson	3	0	0	12
Greg Dowling	2	0	0	8
Steve Renouf	2	0	0	8
Craig Teevan	2	0	0	8
Wally Lewis	1	1/1	0	6
Bob Conway	1	0	0	4
Grant Rix	1	0	0	4

== Honours ==
- Nil

=== League ===
- Player of the year: Kevin Walters
- Rookie of the year: Paul Hauff / Willie Carne
- Best back: Kevin Walters
- Best forward: Gene Miles
- Clubman of the year: Ray Herring
