= 1993 State of Origin series =

Australian rugby league series

- Won by: New South Wales (5th title)
- Series margin: 2 - 1
- Points scored: 88
- Attendance: 106,395 (ave. 35,465 per match)
- Top points scorer(s): Rod Wishart (22)

The 1993 State of Origin series was the 12th year that the annual best-of-three series of rugby league football matches between the Queensland and New South Wales representative teams was contested under 'state of origin' selection rules. Queensland's favourite son Wally Lewis returned as coach just two years after his retirement as a player.

== Game I ==
New South Wales were playing their second series under Phil Gould. Queensland were coached for the first time by their Origin "King" Wally Lewis.

Monday, 3 May 1993

New South Wales	14–10	Queensland
(10 - 1 t, 3 g) Rod Wishart (4 - 1 t) Ricky Stuart	(Report)	Bob Lindner (4 - 1 t); Willie Carne (4 - 1 t); Mal Meninga (2 - 1 g)

Lang Park, Brisbane
Attendance: 33,000
Referee: Greg McCallum
Player of the Match: Ricky Stuart

An extraordinary defensive effort by New South Wales gave them the spoils in Game I. The Blues led 12–2 at half-time and then held on grimly in a dour second half repelling waves of Queensland attackers. At one stage in the second half, Queensland held the ball for 21 consecutive tackles within 10 metres of the Blues line, but never broke through. New South Wales in that half made an incredible 161 tackles and clung on for a 14–10 victory in an effort typified by one of their big-hearted forwards, Ian Roberts, who had to leave the field moments from the end suffering from exhaustion.

The Blues were inspired by Ricky Stuart and his Canberra halves partner Laurie Daley who overshadowed Brisbane halves duo Kevin Walters and Allan Langer.

== Game II ==
Monday, 17 May 1993

New South Wales	16–12	Queensland
(4 - 1 t Laurie Daley (4 - 1 t) Brad Mackay (8 - 1 t, 2 g) Rod Wishart	(Report)	Mal Meninga (4 - 1 t); Kevin Walters (4 - 1 t); Adrian Brunker (2 - 1 g); Dale Shearer(2 - 1 g)

Sydney Football Stadium
Attendance: 41,895
Referee: Eddie Ward
Player of the Match: Tim Brasher

In game II the series could easily have been levelled but Queensland allowed a number of scoring opportunities to slip away. The Maroons led 6–0 at the break after captain Mal Meninga crashed over at the bell but missed at least three try-scoring chances in the first half. Willie Carne scored a fair try from a well planned and well executed cross-field kick by Allan Langer but referee Eddie Ward ruled Carne off-side. Television replays showed he wasn't. In the 30th minute Meninga passed to winger Adrian Brunker who was tackled short of the line after Meninga looked as if he might have scored himself. Four minutes later, Queensland fullback Dale Shearer inexplicably lost the ball in the in-goal area when he should have scored.

New South Wales came out inspired by the half-time words of Phil Gould and struck back promptly and with purpose. Laurie Daley scored early in the second half and lock Brad Mackay was over three minutes later after a Ricky Stuart clearing kick was touched in flight putting NSW on-side and allowing Brad Fittler to regain possession. From having been under pressure and looking as if a loss was imminent, the Blues had bounced back for a four-point lead at 10–6.

Rod Wishart scored again for the Blues before Kevin Walters brought the game back into the balance with a try five minutes from full-time. With time ticking away the Maroons refused to concede and another memorable Origin image was created when Meninga came charging out of his own quarter and raced 40 metres upfield before confronting Laurie Daley the sole New South Wales defender. It was a State of Origin moment frozen in time, captain on captain and the match result resting on the winner of the confrontation. It was the Canberra Raiders captain Meninga being chased by his team-mate and understudy Daley. It was the face of the future Australian Test captain chasing down the present. Meninga drew Daley in and passed to Mark Hohn in support, only to see the front-rower drop the ball as the hooter sounded and the Blues retained the trophy.

== Game III ==
Monday, 31 May 1993

Queensland	24–12	New South Wales
(8 - 2 t) Willie Carne (4 - 1 t) Steve Walters (4 - 1 t) Bob Lindner (4 - 2 g) Mal Meninga (4 - 2 g) Julian O'Neill	(Report)	Andrew Ettingshausen (4 - 1 t); Paul Harragon (4 - 1 t); Rod Wishart (4 - 1 t)

Lang Park, Brisbane
Attendance: 31,500
Referee: Greg McCallum
Player of the Match: Dale Shearer

Although Game III was a dead rubber both teams put on a sterling performance in front of a crowd of 31,500. A first-half brawl erupted when an early scrum broke up in the 23rd minute. Regular combatants and bitter rivals Steve Walters and Ben Elias clashed while Paul Harragon and Martin Bella stood trading blows. In the aftermath referee Greg McCallum sent all four to the sin bin.

While Maroons coach Lewis was able to take some consolation from the win, the night belonged to Queensland stalwart Bob Lindner who was playing his 25th and last Origin match and was farewelled by the Lang Park crowd.

== New South Wales teams ==
Position	Game 1	Game 2	Game 3
Fullback	Tim Brasher		
Wing	Andrew Ettingshausen		Graham Mackay
Centre	Paul McGregor		Andrew Ettingshausen
Centre	Brad Fittler		
Wing	Rod Wishart		
Five-Eighth	Laurie Daley (c)		
Halfback	Ricky Stuart		
Prop	Glenn Lazarus		
Hooker	Ben Elias	Robbie McCormack	Ben Elias
Prop	Ian Roberts		David Fairleigh
Second Row	Paul Sironen		
Second Row	Paul Harragon		
Lock	Brad Mackay		
Interchange	David Fairleigh		Terry Hill
Interchange	Craig Salvatori	David Gillespie	
Interchange	Brett Mullins	Jason Croker	Scott Gourley
Interchange	Jason Taylor		
Coach	Phil Gould		

== Queensland teams ==
Position	Game 1	Game 2	Game 3
Fullback	Gary Belcher	Dale Shearer	
Wing	Willie Carne		Brett Dallas
Centre	Mal Meninga (c)		
Centre	Steve Renouf	Mark Coyne	
Wing	Michael Hancock	Adrian Brunker	Willie Carne
Five-Eighth	Kevin Walters		Julian O'Neill
Halfback	Allan Langer		
Prop	Martin Bella		
Hooker	Steve Walters		
Prop	Steve Jackson	Mark Hohn	
Second Row	Bob Lindner	Trevor Gillmeister	
Second Row	Gary Larson		
Lock	Billy Moore	Bob Lindner	
Interchange	Mark Coyne	Julian O'Neill	Kevin Walters
Interchange	Dale Shearer	Steve Jackson	Darren Smith
Interchange	Mark Hohn	Billy Moore	Steve Jackson
Interchange	Andrew Gee	Darren Smith	Billy Moore
Coach	Wally Lewis		

== See also ==
- 1993 NSWRL season

== Sources ==
- Big League's 25 Years of Origin Collectors' Edition, News Magazines, Surry Hills, Sydney
- Chesterton, Ray (1996) Good as Gould, Ironbark, Sydney
