= 1994 State of Origin series =

Australian rugby league series

- Won by: New South Wales (6th title)
- Series margin: 2 - 1
- Points scored: 81
- Attendance: 169,685 (ave. 56,562 per match)
- Top points scorer(s): Tim Brasher (14)
- Top try scorer(s): Julian O'Neill (2)

The 1994 State of Origin series saw the 13th year that the annual three-game series between the Queensland and New South Wales representative rugby league football teams was contested entirely under 'state of origin' selection rules. Mark Coyne's completion of a miraculous team effort by Queensland to snatch victory in the dying seconds of Game I has become a featured moment in Origin folklore. In Game II a crowd of 87,000 flocked to the MCG setting a new Australian rugby league crowd record. In Game III New South Wales won their first ever Lang Park decider, spoiling Mal Meninga's farewell Origin match.

== Game I ==
Monday, May 23, 1994

Queensland	16–12	New South Wales
(4- 1 t) Julian O'Neill (4 - 1 t) Willie Carne (4 - 1 t) Mark Coyne (4 - 2 g) Mal Meninga	(Report)	Brad Mackay (4- 1 t); Paul Harragon (4- 1 t); Rod Wishart (2 - 1 g); Graham Mackay (2 - 1 g)

Sydney Football Stadium, Sydney
Attendance: 41,859
Referee: Bill Harrigan
Player of the Match: Willie Carne

For 75 minutes New South Wales were the better side and led 12-4 as a trickle of spectators began to make an early exit to beat the traffic. Those that left missed one of the greatest rugby league miracles of all time. With five minutes to go Willie Carne scored for Queensland reaching over his head to take a pass from centre Mark Coyne. Maroons captain Mal Meninga kicked the conversion but the Blues defence rallied from the kick-off and they kept the Queenslanders pinned in their own quarter as the clock ticked down.

Still 60 metres to negotiate. Plays the ball back to Meninga, New South Wales offside. Langer to Kevin Walters then the ball goes to Carne. Carne looking to get the pass away. Renouf plucks it out of the sky, he goes down the touch line, the ball to Hancock, Hancock only 30 out. The pass to Darren Smith, the ball to Langer, Langer's only 18 out, the ball to Meninga, Meninga for the line, back to Coyne, Coyne's in! Try! Try! Try!

— Ray Hadley calling the Coyne try.

With 60 seconds remaining and trailing 12-10 Queensland launched one last attacking wave from deep inside their own half. Halfback Allan Langer initiated the play, firing a long ball to Kevin Walters. The five-eighth passed to Willie Carne, whose overhead pass released Steve Renouf. The Test centre raced up-field as suddenly the tension rose.

The Maroons threw a rapid-fire series of chain passes spanning the breadth of the SFS. The Blues' defence gathered in numbers but as each Queensland player met a tackler he would find another man at his outside shoulder. Renouf, Michael Hancock, Darren Smith, Langer and Mal Meninga all handled and suddenly Mark Coyne was accepting a pass metres out as Brad Fittler and Ricky Stuart tried in vain to bring Coyne down only to see him slide to the line, reach out and score.

Television commentator Ray Warren famously exclaimed, "That's not a try—that's a miracle!" Fittler buried his head in the turf, Stuart in frustration kicked the corner post sky-high and the New South Wales crowd were plunged into deathly silence with 32 seconds left on the clock and the game gone.

== Game II ==
The Blues headed to the Melbourne Cricket Ground full of confidence but with a game plan dictated by coach Phil Gould to play it tight and close despite the massive crowd of novice Melburnian rugby league followers hoping to see a flowing spectacle. The MCG attendance of 87,161 was, at that time, the highest ever for a rugby league match in Australia.

Wednesday, 8 June 1994

New South Wales	14–0	Queensland
(4 - 1 t Glenn Lazarus (4 - 1 t) Paul McGregor (6 - 3 g) Tim Brasher	(Report)

Melbourne Cricket Ground, Melbourne
Attendance: 87,161
Referee: Graham Annesley
Player of the Match: Paul Harragon

Ben Elias laid on the first try, confusing Queensland with some sleight of hand and picking up prop Glenn Lazarus on the burst. With two goals from their fullback Tim Brasher, New South Wales led 8-0 at half-time due to their steely defence and mistake-free football. The Blues wrapped up the match when centre Paul "Mary" McGregor accepted a reverse pass from Stuart and strolled through to clinch a 14-0 win.

== Game III ==
New South Wales arrived at Lang Park for game III having never won a decider there to claim a series. The Queensland crowd's sentiment was focussed on farewelling their hero Mal Meninga in his last Origin and record 38th appearance in a Queensland jumper.

Monday, June 20, 1994

New South Wales	27–12	Queensland
Bradley Clyde (4 - 1 t); Laurie Daley (4 - 1 t); Brett Mullins (4 - 1 t); Brad Fittler (5 - 1 t, 1 fg); Tim Brasher (8 - 4 g); Ben Elias (2 - 2 fg)	(Report)	(4 - 1 t) Andrew Gee (4 - 1 t) Steve Renouf (4 - 1 t) Julian O'Neill (4 - 2 g)

Lang Park, Brisbane
Attendance: 40,665
Referee: Bill Harrigan
Player of the Match: Ben Elias

New South Wales built an early lead with tries to the Canberra trio of Bradley Clyde, Laurie Daley and Brett Mullins who along with half-back Ricky Stuart were out to spoil the occasion for their club captain and friend Meninga. Queensland's nervousness supplied two vital intercepts to allow the tries. The first was taken by hooker Ben Elias off Langer and quickly given to Clyde who scored. The second came when Steve Renouf threw a diabolical pass towards winger Willie Carne. Mullins, then one of the fastest men in the game swooped on the ball and raced 40 metres to score. Daley chipped in with his own gilt-edged contribution, a try in which he sidestepped and swerved his way past five would-be tacklers from 15 metres out.

A try to Queensland forward Andrew Gee cut the lead back to 18-6 at the break. With serious injuries suffered by Jason Smith and Willie Carne there was to be no trademark Queensland revival. Smith suffered a broken jaw following a head clash with Ian Roberts and Carne was carried from the field on a stretcher. Elias kicked a field-goal in the second-half give New South Wales a comfortable buffer even after Steve Renouf's try made the score 19-12 after 55 minutes. In what would be his own final Origin match after 19 career appearances Elias booted the second of three field goals two minutes from full-time, ensuring at least his farewell rather than Mal Meninga's, would be a victor's.

It was a courageous series effort by New South Wales who for the first time in their Origin history came back from a Game I loss to clinch the series and for the first time ever claimed three successive series victories.

== New South Wales squad ==
Position	Game 1	Game 2	Game 3
Fullback	Tim Brasher		
Wing	Graham Mackay	Andrew Ettingshausen	
Centre	Brad Fittler		
Centre	Paul McGregor		
Wing	Rod Wishart	Brett Mullins	
Five-Eighth	Laurie Daley (c)		
Halfback	Ricky Stuart		
Prop	Glenn Lazarus		Ian Roberts
Hooker	Ben Elias		
Prop	Ian Roberts	Paul Harragon	
Second Row	Paul Sironen		
Second Row	Paul Harragon	Dean Pay	
Lock	Brad Mackay	Bradley Clyde	
Interchange	Andrew Ettingshausen	Brad Mackay	
Interchange	Chris Johns		
Interchange	David Gillespie	Ken Nagas	
Interchange	David Barnhill		
Coach	Phil Gould		

== Queensland squad ==
Position	Game 1	Game 2	Game 3
Fullback	Julian O'Neill		
Wing	Michael Hancock		
Centre	Mal Meninga (c)		
Centre	Steve Renouf	Mark Coyne	Steve Renouf
Wing	Willie Carne		
Five-Eighth	Kevin Walters		
Halfback	Allan Langer		
Prop	Martin Bella	Darren Fritz	
Hooker	Steve Walters	Kerrod Walters	Steve Walters
Prop	Andrew Gee		Mark Hohn
Second Row	Trevor Gillmeister		Billy Moore
Second Row	Gary Larson		
Lock	Billy Moore		Jason Smith
Interchange	Mark Coyne	Mark Hohn	Mark Coyne
Interchange	Darren Smith		
Interchange	Mark Hohn	Gorden Tallis	Andrew Gee
Interchange	Darren Fritz	Adrian Vowles	Gorden Tallis
Coach	Wally Lewis		

== See also ==
- 1994 NSWRL season

== Sources ==
- Big League's 25 Years of Origin Collectors' Edition, News Magazines, Surry Hills, Sydney
- Chesterton, Ray (1996) Good as Gould, Ironbark, Sydney
