= Mark Coyne (rugby league) =

Australia international rugby league footballer

Personal information
- Born: 16 August 1967 (age 58) Brisbane, Queensland, Australia

Playing information
- Position: Centre
Club
| Years | Team | Pld | T | G | FG | P |
|---|---|---|---|---|---|---|
| 1987 | Past Brothers | 11 | 9 | 0 | 0 | 36 |
| 1988–98 | St. George Dragons | 207 | 56 | 0 | 0 | 224 |
| 1999 | St George Illawarra | 15 | 5 | 0 | 0 | 20 |
| | Total | 233 | 70 | 0 | 0 | 280 |
Representative
| Years | Team | Pld | T | G | FG | P |
| 1990–97 | Queensland | 19 | 4 | 0 | 0 | 16 |
| 1995–97 | Australia | 9 | 2 | 0 | 0 | 8 |
- Relatives: Peter Coyne (brother)

Mark Coyne (born 16 August 1967) is an Australian former rugby league footballer, a state and international representative player and an Insurance Executive. His football club career was with the St George Dragons and the joint-venture of the St George Illawarra Dragons – he captained both sides. He played principally at centre but sometimes as a wing in his notable representative career. He was also the brother of another first grade footballer, Peter Coyne.

In an era when players also worked while playing Coyne had already spent ten years working in the financial industry having completed a marketing degree before retiring from the NRL in 1999. Coyne then moved into the insurance industry focussing on personal injury claims.

== Club career ==
A Queenslander, Coyne was graded with the Brothers club at Sunnybank, Brisbane, playing in the 1987 Brisbane Rugby League Grand Final and scoring a try. He then relocated to the St George Dragons in Sydney in 1988. He made his first grade debut in 1989 and impressed with his trademark right foot step.

In Round 14 of the 1991 season, Coyne became the first player to score a try on the famous Adelaide Oval in the first NSWRL premiership match played in South Australia. On a cold and wet night in June, St George defeated Balmain 16–2 in front of 28,884 fans, the largest attendance of the 1991 minor round.

In 1992, Coyne played in St George's 28-8 Grand Final loss to the Brisbane Broncos. Coyne played in the 1993 Grand Final for the St George club where once again they lost to Brisbane 14–6. 1994 saw Coyne take on the role as captain of St George, a year when they failed to make the finals.

Coyne's leadership capabilities were fully acknowledged in 1995 when he was captain of St George, vice-captain of Queensland and made his test debut for the Kangaroos. In 1996 Coyne lead the Dragons to another grand final, but despite playing a great game himself the club lost controversially to the Manly-Warringah Sea Eagles 20–8.

In 1998, Coyne was honoured with a testimonial year at St George and impressively, he chose to donate all the proceeds ($135,000) of that testimonial season to a children's charity.

Coyne retired in 1999, whilst playing for the St. George Illawarra Dragons and after 12 seasons wearing the Dragons' Big Red V. By the end of his career he had played in 9 Test matches; 19 Origins and more than 200 first grade matches, of which more than 100 were as captain.

== Representative career ==
Coyne made his State of Origin debut in game II of 1990 for Queensland, after impressive performances in the centres for his club. He had to bide his time and wait another two years before being selected for Queensland in games II and III of 1992. In game II that year Coyne popped up a great pass to send Billy Moore over for a try. Queensland went on to win the match 5–4. In 1993 Coyne played in all three games and set up a try for Mal Meninga in game II.

But 1994 would ultimately provide the most memorable of Coyne's State of Origin appearances and enabled his entry to the annals of Maroon and Origin folklore. In game I, with Queensland down 12-10 and 40 seconds left on the clock, from deep in their own half the Maroons started one of the most memorable try-scoring movements. Allan Langer handled the ball twice in the 11-pass sequence which was finished when Coyne extended his arm in the right corner to thwart the last ditched defensive efforts of Brad Fittler and Ricky Stuart, breaking Blues' hearts in the process and winning the match in a heart-stopping finish. Although NSW went on to win the series 2–1, Channel 9 television commentator Ray "Rabbits" Warren famously stated in his call of the try "That's not a try that's a miracle".

Unfortunately for Coyne, St George suffered a severe downturn in form during the second half of the 1994 NSWRL season, though his own form was still good and he was considered unlucky to miss selection for the successful 1994 Kangaroo tour.

Loyal to the ARL during the Super League war Coyne was one of a handful of senior Queensland players available for representative honours that year and along with Trevor Gillmeister and Dale Shearer he brought experience and spirit to the young Queensland side and their novice coach Paul Vautin. History shows that Queensland won the 1995 Origin series 3–0. Before the 1995 series, Vautin's relatively inexperienced Qld team were not even rated a chance of winning a game against a NSW team that had won the previous 3 Origin series, were coached by Phil Gould and could boast test players Brad Fittler, Tim Brasher, Rod Wishart, Paul McGregor, Greg Florimo, Mark Carroll, Brad Mackay, Geoff Toovey, and future stars Andrew Johns and Steve Menzies

His ARL loyalty was repaid when he made his Australian representative debut in the 1995 Trans-Tasman Test series against New Zealand and he played in the first two Tests of the series, only missing the final test at Suncorp Stadium in Brisbane through injury. The ARL only Kangaroos defeated the Kiwis 3–0. Later that year Coyne was selected in Australia's 1995 Rugby League World Cup squad, played in two pool games (including losing the opening game of the tournament to England at Wembley Stadium, London where he scored his first test try), the 30–20 extra-time semi-final win against New Zealand, and was a member of side that won the final against England 16–8 at Wembley Stadium, London.

He was a mainstay of Australian representative sides during the schismatic years of Super League and made further representative appearances against Papua New Guinea, Fiji and a Rest of the World side in 1997.

=== Career statistics ===
- 207 games for St George
- 15 games for St George Illawarra
- 19 games for Queensland (State of Origin)
- 9 games for the Australian Kangaroos
- 3 grand final appearances: 1992, 1993, 1996 (missed the 1999 Grand Final against the Melbourne Storm due to injury)

== Later years ==
Between 2003 and 2009, Coyne held various positions within GIO Insurance, culminating in his appointment in 2007 as executive general manager of their national workers compensation claims business. He has previously held the position of chief executive/managing director of Coal Services Pty Ltd (February 2010–December 2011), a specialist workers compensation insurance scheme for the coal mining industry. Coyne became CEO of EML (Employers Mutual Limited), a workers compensation claims management mutual in 2012.

Coyne was an NRL Judiciary panel member (2008-2014), NRL and independent chairman of RLPA Education and Welfare Committee for seven years from 2006 to 2014. He became a director of Police and Citizens Youth Club from 2002 to 2012 and a director of the NRMA Road Service between 2000 and 2003. He later became a benefactor of the NSW Children's Cancer Institute and a board member of the Sporting Chance Cancer Foundation.

On 28 February 2019, Coyne was appointed as an Australian Rugby League Commission commissioner. On 17 July, Coyne stood down as an ARLC commissioner following an incident in Singapore. Returning to Australia, he pleaded guilty to the charge of swearing at an officer and was fined A$4,000.

== Awards ==
- Australian Sports Medal (NRL) 2000
- Centenary Medal (sport and community) for service to sport and the community 2001
- Ken Stephen medal – The Ken Stephen medal sponsored by Telstra recognises the outstanding contribution an NRL player has made to the community over the course of a season – 1998
- St George Illawarra Dragons' Mark Coyne Trophy awarded to a player annually for career development (inaugural year 2007)

== Sources ==
- Andrews, Malcolm (2006) The ABC of Rugby League Australian Broadcasting Corporation, Sydney
- Big League's 25 Years of Origin Collectors' Edition, News Magazines, Surry Hills, Sydney
- Whiticker, Alan & Hudson, Glen (2006) The Encyclopedia of Rugby League Players, Gavin Allen Publishing, Sydney
