= Michael Hancock (rugby league) =

Australia international rugby league footballer

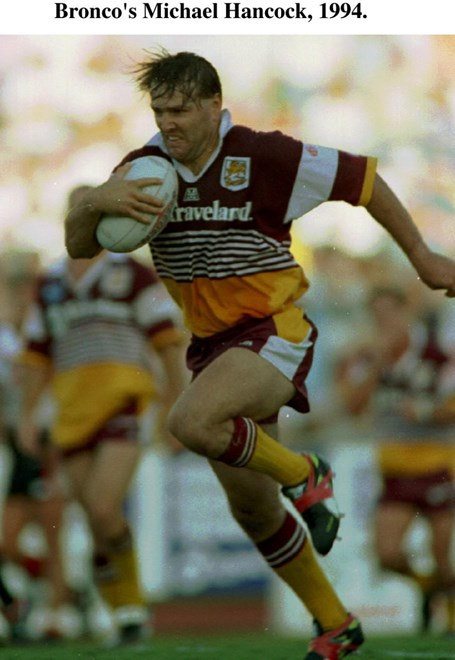

Personal information
- Full name: Michael John Hancock
- Born: 21 October 1969 (age 56) Stanthorpe, Queensland, Australia

Playing information
- Height: 183 cm (6 ft 0 in)
- Weight: 94 kg (14 st 11 lb)
- Position: Wing
Club
Years	Team	Pld	T	G	FG	P
1987	Toowoomba
1988–00	Brisbane Broncos	274	120	2	0	484
1989–91	Swinton	10	1	0	0	4
1991	Runcorn Highfield	1	0	0	0	0
2001–02	Salford City Reds	37	7	0	0	28
	Total	322	128	2	0	516
Representative
Years	Team	Pld	T	G	FG	P
1989–96	Queensland	14	5	0	0	20
1989–94	Australia	13	5	0	0	20
1997	Queensland (SL)	2	1	0	0	4

Michael John "Mick" Hancock (born 21 October 1969) is an Australian former rugby league footballer who played in the 1980s, 1990s and 2000s. An Australian international and Queensland State of Origin representative wing, he played in the Brisbane Broncos' first five Grand Final victories in 1992, 1993, 1997 Super League, 1998 and 2000. At the time of his retirement from football in Australia in 2000 he held the Broncos' club records for most career appearances. He played out the rest of his career in England with the Salford City Reds and retired in 2002.

== Early career ==
Hancock started out playing in the under 16's/18's and A Grade in the Toowoomba rugby league for the Stanthorpe Gremlins. The young wing, Hancock starred as a 17-year-old for the Toowoomba Clydesdales in the Winfield State League.

== First grade career ==
In 1988, Hancock joined the Brisbane Broncos for the club's initial season in the New South Wales Rugby League premiership as a member of the first Brisbane run-on team that thrashed defending premiers the Manly-Warringah Sea Eagles 44–10 in 1988's season opener at Brisbane's Lang Park in a side that included representative players Wally Lewis (captain), Colin Scott, Joe Kilroy, Gene Miles, Allan Langer, Bryan Niebling, Greg Dowling and Greg Conescu.

In 1989, Hancock made his début for the Queensland Maroons, becoming the then-youngest footballer of either state to play in a State of Origin series and scored two tries in the 36–6 win over NSW at Lang Park. He then made his Test début on the 1989 mid-season tour of New Zealand while still a teenager. Having already represented his state in all three matches of that year's Origin series, he also played in all six matches on the New Zealand tour, scoring three tries. He played in all three Tests against the Kiwis and scored his first try in test football in Australia's 8–0 win in the second test at the Rotorua International Stadium on 16 July. He was known for his strength, elusiveness and a wide-legged running style that allowed him to change direction sharply and sometimes several times as he approached opposition defences. Hancock was named the 1989 Brisbane Broncos season's rookie of the year.

== 1990s ==
In 1990 Hancock missed the one-off Test against France with a hamstring injury, but regained his spot on the wing for the test against New Zealand in Wellington where he scored a try in Australia's 24–6 win. He was then selected for the 1990 Kangaroo Tour of Great Britain and France at the end of the 1990 NSWRL season. Unfortunately, an ankle injury suffered in Australia's 19–14 loss to Great Britain in the first test loss at Wembley, London limited him to just six games on the English leg of the tour and he lost his test spot to Broncos teammate Dale Shearer. The first test loss was something of a disaster for Hancock as his opposite winger Paul Eastwood crossed for two of the Lions three tries on the day. Although he returned to action, before the second Ashes series test, scoring a try in a 36–18 win over Halifax, Shearer's form was such (scoring a try in the Aussies 14–10 win at Old Trafford in the second test) that Hancock was unable to regain his test spot for the remainder of the tour.

In 1991 he was overlooked for the mid-season Trans Tasman tests against New Zealand, nor could he gain a spot on the end of season tour of Papua New Guinea. He later regained his Test spot and played in all three Ashes tests against Great Britain during the 1992 Great Britain Lions tour of Australia and New Zealand, helping Australia retain The Ashes. At the end of the year Hancock was a member of the Broncos team that defeated the St George Dragons 28–8 in the 1992 Winfield Cup Grand Final. He then traveled to England where he played on the wing in Australia's 10–6 win over Great Britain in the 1992 World Cup final in front of 73,631 fans at Wembley Stadium, London. Hancock had a solid game in the WCF, keeping St. Helens winger Alan Hunte quiet. A week after the Final, Hancock scored two tries in Brisbane's 22–8 victory over English champions Wigan in the 1992 World Club Challenge at Central Park. In winning the Broncos became the first Australian team to win the World Club Challenge on British soil.

Hancock made his second tour of New Zealand in 1993, playing all three tests of the 1993 Trans-Tasman series and scoring his 5th and final test try in the third test at Lang Park. He played in Brisbane's second consecutive premiership win in 1993, again defeating St George in the Grand Final. During the 1994 NSWRL season, Hancock played at centre for Brisbane when they lost 20–14 against Wigan in the 1994 World Club Challenge in front of a WCC record attendance of 54,220 at Brisbane's ANZ Stadium.

Michael Hancock played his last test for Australia in 1994 against France in a 58–0 win at the Parramatta Stadium in Sydney. Called into the team after injury ruled out Broncos teammate Willie Carne, Hancock didn't score in the game but made a number of breaks and almost always had the hapless French grasping at air trying to tackle him. After being selected for his second Kangaroo Tour in 1994, his test career ended when he injured his shoulder in a training mishap only a week before the first Ashes test at Wembley. In a case of Déjà vu with 1990, he would return to the field before the tour ended, but wasn't able to regain his test place either on tour or in the following years.

== 2000s ==
The advent of the unlimited interchange rule prolonged Hancock's career, with coach Wayne Bennett opting to use him as an impact player on the wing or in the Second-row. The last of the foundation players to leave the club, it was only fitting then, in his thirteenth season with the same club, that he left the Broncos after the 14–6 victory over the Sydney Roosters in the 2000 NRL grand final to play out the rest of his career for Salford in England. Also in 2000 Hancock was awarded the Australian Sports Medal for his contribution to Australia's international standing in the sport of rugby league. At the time of his retirement, he held the record for most appearances for the Broncos until Darren Lockyer surpassed him in 2007, and was number two on the club's all-time top try-scorers list with 120 (second only to Steve Renouf's 142).

== Post-playing ==
In 2003, Hancock was one of the first four former players inducted into the Broncos official Hall of Fame. During the 2007 season at the Broncos' 20-year anniversary celebration, the club announced a list of the 20 best players to play for them to date which included Hancock. In 2008, rugby league in Australia's centenary year, Hancock was named on the wing in the Toowoomba and South West Team of the Century.

Hancock has been involved in rugby league development encouraging children to take up the sport.
