= Peter Coyne (rugby league) =

Australian rugby league footballer

Personal information
- Full name: Peter Coyne
- Born: 28 October 1964 (age 60); Brisbane, Queensland, Australia

Playing information
- Position: Five-eighth
Club
Years	Team	Pld	T	G	FG	P
1988–89	Halifax	25	3	5	0	22
1991–92	St. George Dragons	34	0	13	2	28
1992–93	Castleford	29	2	1	0	10
	Total	88	5	19	2	60
- Source: As of 1 November 2019
- Relatives: Mark Coyne (brother)

Peter Coyne (born 28 October 1964) is an Australian former rugby league footballer who played in the 1980s and 1990s.

== Playing career ==
Coyne started his career at the Brisbane Valleys club and later at the English Halifax, before joining his brother Mark Coyne at St. George Dragons in 1991.

Coyne was a five-eighth, and played in the 1992 Grand Final for St. George Dragons. After two great years at the Dragons, he returned to England to play for Castleford.
