= Brad Mackay =

Australia international rugby league footballer

Brad MacKay
Personal information
- Born: 7 February 1969 (age 57) Sydney, New South Wales, Australia

Playing information
- Height: 183 cm (6 ft 0 in)
- Weight: 90 kg (14 st 2 lb)
- Position: Lock, Second-row, Centre
Club
Years	Team	Pld	T	G	FG	P
1987–94	St George Dragons	117	23	13	0	118
1995	Western Reds	21	4	0	0	16
1996–98	Illawarra Steelers	56	8	5	0	42
1999	St. George Illawarra	23	3	4	0	20
2000	Bradford Bulls	31	9	0	0	36
	Total	248	47	22	0	232
Representative
Years	Team	Pld	T	G	FG	P
1989–95	New South Wales	17	3	0	0	12
1990–94	Australia	12	6	0	0	24

Brad Mackay (born 7 February 1969 in Sydney, New South Wales) is an Australian former rugby league footballer who played in the 1980s and 1990s. A versatile lock for the St George Dragons, Illawarra Steelers, Western Reds and the joint-venture of St. George Illawarra Dragons, he also represented New South Wales in the State of Origin and Australia.

== Playing career ==
A St George junior from the Brighton Seagulls club, Mackay was graded by the Dragons in 1987 and then played 117 games with club over eight seasons until 1994 scoring 22 tries. Playing all positions in the backline bar halfback, he was most remembered for his lock position in his peak.

Mackay debuted for the New South Wales Blues as a reserve in game II of the 1989 State of Origin series. He went on to play 17 Origin games between 1989 and 1995, scoring three tries at that level.

Mackay had his best season in 1990, making his test début for Australia in the mid-season test against France, becoming only the second player to score a hat trick of tries on début for Australia. A month after the France test, Mackay went on to play in a one-off test against New Zealand. Following the season he was selected for the 1990 Kangaroo Tour, coming into the test team for the winning 2nd and 3rd Ashes Tests against Great Britain before playing in the two tests against France.

After failing to hold his test place in 1991, Mackay was selected for the first two tests against Great Britain during the Lions 1992 tour of Australasia but missed the last match of the series through injury. After playing in a World Cup qualifying match against Papua New Guinea in Townsville, Mackay was used as a replacement in the Dragons 8-28 Grand Final loss to the Brisbane Broncos and missed a place in Australia's World Cup Final winning team.

1993 saw Mackay continue his good form and he was the starting lock forward for NSW in all three State of Origin games in the Blues 2–1 series win over Queensland. The return from injury of Bradley Clyde would see Mackay on the bench for Australia in the 1st and 3rd Trans-Tasman Tests against New Zealand.

Later that year he became one of only four players (the others being Bradley Clyde in 1991, Daly Cherry-Evans in 2013 and Jack Wighton in 2019) to win the Clive Churchill Medal from the losing side when the Dragons went down 6–14 in the Grand Final, again to the Brisbane Broncos.

St. George's form dropped markedly in 1994 and Mackay could only make the Bench for NSW in their 1994 State of Origin series win over Queensland, with NSW coach Phil Gould preferring Bradley Clyde at lock. He made his final test appearance for Australia from the interchange bench in the 1994 mid-season test against France at Parramatta Stadium, but the Dragons poor form, which saw them fall to 11th on the premiership ladder, saw Mackay overlooked for the 1994 Kangaroo Tour bringing down the curtain on his international career.

Mackay decided to leave the Dragons due to a poor relationship with coach Brian Smith, later saying, "Brian had signed an extension on his contract and so I felt like I needed a change or I'd go down the drain as a player."

Mackay joined the Western Reds in 1995, accepting the foundation captaincy of the Perth-based side, but moved back east when they joined the Super League franchise from 1996.

He started playing for the Illawarra Steelers in 1996, staying for three seasons over which he played 56 games. A return to his best form and season-long consistency in 1997 earned him the BHP Medal as the Steelers' player of the year. Mackay later became part of the new St. George when the joint venture was formed in 1999, playing 24 games, including an appearance from the bench in the 1999 NRL Grand Final loss to the Melbourne Storm.

Mackay had played a total of 248 first grade games over 12 years.

Mackay played out his career in the 2000 season with the Bradford Bulls in the UK, winning the Challenge Cup Final with them.

== Post playing ==
Brad Mackay is a committed Christian. In 2003, he was active in fund raising for the Joanne Mackay Helping Hand Foundation following the 2002 passing of wife, Joanne from breast cancer. He lives in the Illawarra area with his second wife, Tracy and is a fireman.
