= Mitch Rivett =

Australian rugby league footballer

Personal information
- Born: 11 September 1989 (age 36) Redcliffe, Queensland, Australia
- Height: 191 cm (6 ft 3 in)
- Weight: 95 kg (14 st 13 lb)

Playing information
- Position: Wing, Centre
Club
Years	Team	Pld	T	G	FG	P
2010	Brisbane Broncos	2	0	0	0	0
- Source: As of 9 April 2010

Mitch Rivett (born 11 September 1989), is an Australian professional rugby league footballer who has played in the 2010s. He played for the Brisbane Broncos in the National Rugby League (NRL) competition and the Redcliffe Dolphins in the Queensland Cup, as a wing or centre.
