= Keith Gee =

Australian rugby league footballer

Personal information
- Full name: Keith William Bernard Gee
- Born: 16 October 1963 (age 62) Australia

Playing information
- Position: Second-row, Prop
Club
Years	Team	Pld	T	G	FG	P
1988	Brisbane	12	1	0	0	4
1990–91	Gold Coast	25	1	0	0	4
	Total	37	2	0	0	8
- Source: As of 31 January 2019

Keith Gee is an Australian former professional rugby league footballer who played in the 1980s and 1990s. He played as a forward in 12 games for the Brisbane Broncos from 1988 to 1989, including their first ever match. He also represented Queensland in a tour match against New Zealand in 1987.

== Personal life ==
Gee is the brother of four time Broncos premiership player Andrew Gee and former Gold Coast Seagulls player Mark Gee.

== Playing career ==
Gee made his first grade debut for Brisbane in Round 1, 1988 against Brisbane in the club's inaugural game as the Broncos defeated Manly-Warringah 44–10. Gee scored his only try for Brisbane the following week in a 20–18 victory over Penrith.

In 1989, Gee joined the Gold Coast and played with the club for three seasons. His last season with the Gold Coast ended with a wooden spoon in 1991, with his final game in first grade being a 32–10 loss against North Sydney at North Sydney Oval.

== Career stats ==
Season	Team	Appearances	Tries	Goals	Goal-kicking percentage	Field goals	Points
1988 NSWRL Season	Brisbane Broncos	12	1	-	-	-	4
1990 NSWRL Season	Gold Coast Seagulls	9	-	-	-	-	-
1991 NSWRL Season	Gold Coast Seagulls	16	1	-	-	-	4

== Post-playing ==
Gee contested the 2009 Queensland state election in the seat of Beaudesert as an independent candidate. He was not elected, finishing in fourth place on the first preference count with 7.8% of the votes.

In 2016, Gee was appointed coach of the Beaudesert Kingfishers.
