= Craig Grauf =

Australian rugby league footballer

Personal information
- Full name: Craig Grauf
- Born: 24 July 1967 (age 59) Brisbane, Queensland, Australia

Playing information
- Position: Halfback
Club
Years	Team	Pld	T	G	FG	P
1988	Brisbane	5	0	0	0	0
1990–91	Fulham RLFC	0	0	0	0	0
1996	Gold Coast	6	1	0	0	4
	Total	11	1	0	0	4

Craig Grauf (born 24 July 1967) is a former professional rugby league footballer who played in the 1980s and 1990s.

== Playing career ==
Grauf, a talented halfback or five-eighth, started his first-grade career in the Brisbane competition in 1986 for the Norths Devils when coach Greg Oliphant decided to give the then 18-year-old a shock call-up. Not only was he promoted to the top-grade, but he also became the BRL's youngest-ever captain in the process. Grauf cemented his spot in first-grade for Norths and was instrumental in the club's much improved 1987 season which saw them reach the preliminary final.

He also played for Fulham RLFC in England during the Australian off-season of 1990–91.

He was then signed by the Brisbane Broncos for their inaugural season, coming off the bench in the club’s maiden premiership game and producing the bomb that led to Brisbane's first-ever try (scored by Brett Le Man) in the NSWRL competition against Manly in round one at Lang Park. After playing only five first-grade games over two seasons at the Broncos, due to being stuck behind the likes of Allan Langer and Wally Lewis in his chosen positions, Grauf went back to Norths in the BRL, where he would go on to star in season 1992, before moving on to the Souths Magpies, where he also excelled. After an eight-year drought in first grade (NSWRL/ARL), he played for the Gold Coast Chargers in 1996, but only featured in seven first-grade games before retiring. His final game in first grade was in Round 22, 1996 against North Sydney at North Sydney Oval, where the Gold Coast lost the match 38-8.

== Representative career ==
Grauf was selected for, and captained, the Queensland Residents side from 1992 to 1995.
