= Grant Thorogood =

Australian rugby league footballer

Playing information
- Position: Wing
Club
Years	Team	Pld	T	G	FG	P
1989	Brisbane Broncos	1	0	0	0	0

Grant Thorogood is an Australian former professional rugby league footballer who played for the Brisbane Broncos in the New South Wales Rugby League (NSWRL). He is a member of the Sunshine Coast Team of the Century.

Thorogood made his only first-grade appearance for the Broncos in round 16 of the 1989 NSWRL season, against the Penrith Panthers at Penrith Park. He played on the wing in place of Joe Kilroy.

In 2012 he served as coach of the Nambour Crushers.
