= Gary French =

Australian rugby league footballer

Personal information
- Full name: Gary French
- Born: 27 June 1963 (age 62) Brisbane, Queensland, Australia

Playing information
- Position: Five-eighth, Halfback, Centre
Club
Years	Team	Pld	T	G	FG	P
1985–87	Souths Brisbane
1987–88	Springfield Borough	0	0	0	0	0
1988–89	Brisbane	27	2	10	0	28
1989–91	Castleford	52	14	1	1	59
	Total	79	16	11	1	87
- Source: As of 21 April 2021

Gary French (born 27 June 1963) is an Australian former professional rugby league footballer who played in the 1980s and 1990s. He played as a halfback for the Brisbane Broncos and whilst at the club, regularly understudied for both Allan Langer and Wally Lewis. He also had stints at British clubs Springfield Borough (1987–88) and Castleford (1988–91). French captained Brisbane on one occasion. He is no relation to Queensland State of Origin brothers Brett and Ian French.

== Early life ==
While attending Beaudesert High School, French played for the Australian Schoolboys team in 1981.

== Playing career ==
French played for Souths in their 1985 Brisbane Rugby League premiership grand final win over Wynnum-Manly, kicking the first points of the match.
