= Billy Noke =

Australian rugby league footballer

Personal information
- Full name: Billy Noke
- Born: 6 October 1963 (age 61); Sydney, New South Wales, Australia

Playing information
- Position: Second-row
Club
Years	Team	Pld	T	G	FG	P
1982–87	St. George Dragons	67	6	12	0	48
1988	Brisbane Broncos	16	3	0	0	12
1989–90	St. George Dragons	22	0	1	0	2
1991	South Sydney	6	0	0	0	0
1992	Western Suburbs	3	0	0	0	0
	Total	114	9	13	0	62
- Source: As of 31 January 2019

Billy Noke is an Australian former professional rugby league footballer who played for the St. George Dragons, Brisbane Broncos, South Sydney Rabbitohs and the Western Suburbs Magpies. He played primarily in the back row. He is the cousin of Kyle Noke.

== Career ==
He starred in the unbeaten Australian Schoolboy Tour of England in 1979 before being a member of the premiership winning St. George Dragons Presidents Cup team in 1981.

He was then graded by St George in 1982 as an import (there was a local junior/import rule at the time with each club being limited to a number of imported players) Noke, took a risk doing this as one more year in the local junior's competition would have given him local junior status.

He would then not have been included in the limited number of imported players a club could have at the time, he really had to back his ability to do this with many other imported forwards at the club experienced NSW & Australian representatives.

A talented ball-player with a good kicking game, Noke played in the Dragons' 1985 Grand Final loss to Canterbury. In the same season, he won the Dally M second rower of the year, but his career did not take off as expected when he went to the Broncos upon their inception into the NSWRL premiership. His return to Sydney, with seasons at Souths and Wests was similarly unsuccessful.

Noke captain-coached Turvey Park to the 1993 Group 9 Premiership.
