= Ken Gittins =

Australian rugby league footballer

Personal information
- Full name: Kenneth Gittins
- Born: 18 January 1966 (age 59); Papua New Guinea

Playing information
- Height: 5 ft 10 in (1.78 m)
- Weight: 13 st 5 lb (85 kg)
- Position: Wing
Club
Years	Team	Pld	T	G	FG	P
1987–88	Penrith Panthers	8	2	0	0	8
1989	Brisbane Broncos	4	0	0	0	0
	Total	12	2	0	0	8

Ken Gittins (born 18 January 1966) is an Australian former professional rugby league footballer who played for the Penrith Panthers and the Brisbane Broncos in the late 1980s.

A winger, Gittins won a Brisbane Rugby League premiership with Souths Magpies in 1985. From 1987 to 1988 he played first-grade for Penrith, then in 1989 was reunited with his former Souths Magpies coach Wayne Bennett at the Brisbane Broncos.
