= Brett Le Man =

Australian rugby league footballer

Personal information
- Full name: Brett Le Man
- Born: 15 April 1962 (age 64) Brisbane, Queensland, Australia

Playing information
- Position: Second-row
Club
Years	Team	Pld	T	G	FG	P
19??–8?	Easts (Brisbane)
198?–87	Brothers (Brisbane)
1988–91	Brisbane Broncos	38	9	0	0	36
	Total	38	9	0	0	36
- Source: As of 31 January 2019

Brett Le Man (born 15 April 1962) is an Australian former professional rugby league footballer who played in the 1980s and 1990s.

== Background ==
While attending Coorparoo High School, Le Man played for the Australian Schoolboys team in 1979.

== Playing career ==
The curly-haired back-rower played in the Brisbane Rugby League (BRL) for the Easts Tigers and Brisbane Brothers, winning a first-grade premiership with both clubs (Easts in 1983, and Brothers in 1987). Le Man went on to play for the Brisbane Broncos between their foundation year of 1988 and 1991, appearing in 38 games and scoring nine tries. In 1988, he famously scored the Broncos' first-ever try in a premiership match, during their inaugural game against Manly in round one at Lang Park, after gathering possession of the ball following a Craig Grauf bomb.

== Post playing ==
Le Man now owns his own company and has two children.
