= Bryan Niebling =

Australia international rugby league footballer (born 1960)

Personal information
- Full name: Bryan Niebling
- Born: 18 July 1960 (age 66) Murgon, Queensland, Australia

Playing information
- Position: Prop, Second-row
Club
Years	Team	Pld	T	G	FG	P
1980–83	Fortitude Valley	67	20	0	0	64
1984–87	Redcliffe	72	13	0	1	53
1988–89	Brisbane	20	2	0	0	8
1989–91	Hull KR	26	2	0	0	8
	Total	185	37	0	1	133
Representative
Years	Team	Pld	T	G	FG	P
1983–87	Queensland	9	1	0	0	4
1984–87	Australia	13	1	0	0	4

Bryan Niebling (born 18 July 1960) is an Australian former professional rugby league footballer who played in the 1980s and 1990s. Niebling played in the forwards. After a successful Brisbane Rugby League premiership, and representative career for both his state and country, Niebling played in the New South Wales Rugby League premiership for the Brisbane Broncos from their first ever game. Nicknamed 'Horse', Niebling was a constant thorn in the side of New South Wales forwards during the titanic State of Origin clashes of the early 1980s.

== Playing career ==
During the 1979 Great Britain Lions tour Neibling played for a Wide Bay team that played against Great Britain in Maryborough. His career in the State of Origin arena saw him make 9 appearances while playing for Brisbane Valleys and Redcliffe.

Niebling made his Test début in the second row against Great Britain in 1984, and ultimately played in all three matches of Australia's Ashes whitewash. Named Redcliffe's player of the season and co-winner of the Brisbane Rugby League premiership's Rothmans Medal in 1986, Niebling went on the unbeaten 1986 Kangaroo tour of Great Britain and France and played in 10 matches including all five Tests.

The last of Niebling's 13 Test appearances was in Australia's 13-6 loss to New Zealand at Lang Park in 1987. Niebling captained Redcliffe in the 1987 Woolies pre-season, but missed most of the regular season due to injury. He was succeeded as captain of the side by Steve Bleakley, but returned to play in Redcliffe's Grand Final loss to Past Brothers.

By the time the Broncos had entered the New South Wales Rugby League premiership in 1988, his career was winding down because of injury. He later played for Hull Kingston Rovers in 1989-91.
