= Brook Kennedy =

Australian rugby league footballer

Playing information
- Position: Lock
Club
Years	Team	Pld	T	G	FG	P
1988–89	Brisbane Broncos	3	0	0	0	0
1990–91	Penrith Panthers	13	0	0	0	0
	Total	16	0	0	0	0

Brook Kennedy is an Australian former professional rugby league footballer who played for the Brisbane Broncos and Penrith Panthers.

Kennedy played for Brisbane Easts, before making his first-grade debut for the Broncos in 1988. Following two NSWRL seasons at Brisbane, he moved to Penrith where he featured more regularly. He played 13 first-grade games across 1990 and 1991 for the Panthers, mostly as a lock.
