= Greg Conescu =

Australia international rugby league footballer

William Greg Conescu
Personal information
- Born: 24 May 1960 (age 66) Brisbane, Queensland, Australia

Playing information
- Position: Hooker
Club
Years	Team	Pld	T	G	FG	P
1979–83	Northern Suburbs	86	21	0	0	64
1985–87	Redcliffe	51	8	0	0	32
1988–89	Brisbane Broncos	28	4	0	0	16
	Total	165	33	0	0	112
Representative
Years	Team	Pld	T	G	FG	P
1980–88	Queensland	21	2	0	0	8
1982–88	Australia	9	2	0	0	8

William "Greg" Conescu (born 24 May 1960) is an Australian former professional rugby league footballer. An Australia national and Queensland State of Origin representative hooker, he played all of his club football in Queensland with Norths Devils (with whom he won the BRL premiership in 1980) Gladstone Brothers, Redcliffe and the Brisbane Broncos.

== Playing career ==
Born to Romanian parents, Conescu achieved Brisbane Rugby League premiership success with the Norths Devils in 1980 and also played for Gladstone Brothers and Redcliffe Dolphins. While playing for Norths, Conescu made his debut for both the Australian Kangaroos and Queensland. In 1987 he played for Redcliffe in the BRL grand final.

In 1988, Conescu entered the New South Wales Rugby League premiership with the Brisbane Broncos, playing in the club's first ever match in 1988. He continued to represent Queensland in the State of Origin series that year, and was again selected in the Australian Kangaroos side. On 20 July 1988 Conescu played for Australia in their record 62-point win over Papua New Guinea, scoring a try. Despite being the incumbent Australian and Queensland hooker, he was surprisingly dropped to reserve grade by coach Wayne Bennett in favour of a young Kerrod Walters.

== Accolades ==
In 2000, Conescu was awarded the Australian Sports Medal for his contribution to Australia's international standing in the sport of rugby league.

As part of State of Origin's 25th anniversary in 2005, the Australian Rugby League announced the 25 greatest players for both Queensland and New South Wales, with Conescu named for the Queenslanders.

Conescu was named as a reserve in an all-time greatest Norths Devils team announced in 2008.

== Sources ==
- Alan Whiticker & Glen Hudson (2007). The Encyclopedia of Rugby League Players. Wetherill Park, New South Wales: Gary Allen Pty Ltd. pp. 96–97. ISBN 978-1-877082-93-1.
