= Grant Rix =

Australian rugby league footballer (born 1965)

Personal information
- Full name: Grant Rix
- Born: 9 February 1965 (age 61)

Playing information
- Position: Centre, Wing, Halfback, Fullback
Club
Years	Team	Pld	T	G	FG	P
1984–85	Fortitude Valley	0	0	0	0	0
1986–87	Halifax	30	11	0	0	44
1988–90	Brisbane	20	2	0	0	8
	Total	50	13	0	0	52
- Source: As of 31 January 2019

Grant Rix (born 9 February 1965) is an Australian former professional rugby league footballer who played in the 1980s and 1990s. During his career he played in the Brisbane Rugby League premiership for Fortitude Valley Diehards, the New South Wales Rugby League premiership with the Brisbane Broncos and in England with Halifax. Rix had huge potential and was seen to be the successor to Wally Lewis until he was struck with successive knee operations and was forced to retire aged 24 years.

== Playing career ==
Rix was selected for the Australian Schoolboys 1982 & 1983 and Queensland v New Zealand 1984 (18 years 254 days old). He toured Papua New Guinea with the President's XIII Australian side in 1985. Rix was selected for Queensland for State of Origin III in 1986 (49th player to be selected for Queensland), but did not take the field. Rix played for the Brisbane Broncos between 1988 and 1990.

=== Challenge Cup Final appearances ===
Rix played at centre in Halifax's 19–18 victory over St. Helens in the 1987 Challenge Cup Final during the 1986–87 season at Wembley Stadium, London on Saturday 2 May 1987 with a crowd of 94,652.

== Post playing ==
Rix was a member of the Brisbane coaching staff between 1991 and 1993. Rix then coached the Norths Devils between 1994 and 1995.
