= Joe Kilroy =

Australian rugby league footballer (born 1960)

Personal information
- Full name: Joe Kilroy
- Born: 21 June 1960 (age 66) Maryborough, Queensland, Australia

Playing information
- Position: Wing, Fullback
Club
Years	Team	Pld	T	G	FG	P
1980–83	Norths (Brisbane)	73	24	6
1984–87	Brothers (Brisbane)	77	41
1985–86	Halifax	26	7	0	0	28
1988–91	Brisbane Broncos	31	12	0	0	48
	Total	207	84	6	0	76
Representative
Years	Team	Pld	T	G	FG	P
1988	Queensland	2	1	0	0	4

"Smokin" Joe Kilroy (born 21 June 1960) is an Australian former rugby league footballer who played in the 1980s and 1990s. A Queensland State of Origin representative wing/fullback, he played club football in the Brisbane Rugby League Premiership with Brothers and Northern Suburbs club and in the Sydney Rugby League Premiership with the Brisbane Broncos.

He also played full-back in the Halifax team which surprised everyone in English rugby league by winning the Rugby Football League Championship in 1985–86 under player-coach Chris Anderson.

== Early life ==
When Kilroy was two-years old his mother was killed in a car crash. He subsequently spent 11 years in the care of the Sisters of Mercy at Nudgee, before being sent to the controversial BoysTown school, where he was assaulted regularly by staff.

== Career ==
Early in his football career Joe Kilroy played for Brisbane's Northern Suburbs club, with a man-of-the-match performance in their win over Souths in the 1980 Brisbane Rugby League grand final. He later played for Brothers, playing for them in the 1987 BRL grand final and scoring two tries. His big year however was 1988, when he played in the first ever Brisbane Broncos match as well as the State of Origin. He was nicknamed 'Smokin' Joe, because of his great speed on the football field.

In 1983 Kilroy was ranked as the world's best fullback, but in 1989 he was sent to jail for three years on drug-related charges, during his sentence, he travelled out to Charleville in 1990 following the disastrous flood which devastated the town. On his release in 1991, he played one game for the Broncos.

== Post playing ==
Kilroy has since been named in the 4 BC Brisbane Rugby League's Team of the 80s. In 2008 he was named on the wing of an all-time greatest Norths Devils team. Kilroy was runner-up to Tony Obst for the Brisbane Rugby League Rothman's Medal in 1980.
