= Craig Teevan =

Australian rugby league footballer

Personal information
- Full name: Craig Teevan
- Born: 7 January 1970 (age 56)

Playing information
- Height: 178 cm (5 ft 10 in)
- Weight: 84 kg (13 st 3 lb)
- Position: Hooker, Halfback
Club
Years	Team	Pld	T	G	FG	P
1988–90	Brisbane	6	2	0	0	8
1991	Cronulla-Sutherland	13	0	3	0	6
1992	Manly-Warringah	2	0	0	0	0
1993	Brisbane	2	0	0	0	0
1995–97	South Queensland	60	3	0	0	12
1998	Gold Coast	22	2	0	0	8
	Total	105	7	3	0	34
Representative
Years	Team	Pld	T	G	FG	P
1995	Queensland	3	0	0	0	0

Craig Teevan is an Australian former professional rugby league footballer who played in the 1980s and 1990s. During his time as a player, he represented five clubs in his usual positions of hooker or halfback and also played State of Origin for Queensland.

== Early life ==
While attending Oakey State High in 1986, Teevan was selected for the Australian schoolboys rugby league team.

== Playing career ==
Teevan was appointed captain of the South Queensland Crushers for the 1995 ARL season. Teevan played in the club's final ever game which was 39–18 victory against Western Suburbs. The following season, Teevan joined the Gold Coast and played in their final ever game as a first grade side which was a 20–18 loss against Cronulla-Sutherland.

At representative level, Teevan was selected for the Queensland team's interchange bench in all three games of the Maroons' successful 1995 State of Origin series.

== Post playing ==
Teevan was the CEO of Ipswich Jets rugby league club.
