= Ray Herring =

Australian rugby league footballer

Personal information
- Full name: Ray Herring
- Born: 24 September 1967 (age 57); Oakey, Queensland, Australia
- Height: 179 cm (5 ft 10 in)
- Weight: 81 kg (179 lb; 12 st 11 lb)

Playing information
- Position: Hooker
Club
Years	Team	Pld	T	G	FG	P
1988–90	Brisbane Broncos	5	0	0	0	0
1991–94	Gold Coast	56	9	0	0	36
1995	South Queensland	6	0	0	0	0
	Total	67	9	0	0	36
- Source: As of 31 January 2019

Ray Herring (born 24 September 1967) is an Australian rugby league former professional rugby league footballer who played for three Queensland clubs in Australia during the 1980s and 1990s. Herring was the player who threw the pass that hit Mario Fenech in the head, leading to the term "Falcon".

== Background ==
Herring attended Oakey State High and, in 1984, was part of the Australian Schoolboys team.

== Playing career ==
In 1988, he made his first grade debut for the Brisbane Broncos. Herring remained with the Broncos for the next three seasons but was only used sparingly and from the bench.

In 1991, he switched clubs, joining the Gold Coast. Herring played in fifty six matches for the club over the next four years and often started at hooker. However the club was not competitive.

In 1995, Herring returned to Brisbane, joining the new South Queensland Crushers franchise. He played in their inaugural match on 11 March 1995 but only played in five other matches throughout the season before retiring.
