= Mark Hohn =

Australia international rugby league footballer

Personal information
- Full name: Mark Hohn
- Born: 29 January 1964 (age 62) Pittsworth, Queensland, Australia

Playing information
- Position: Prop
Club
Years	Team	Pld	T	G	FG	P
1987	Fortitude Valley	5	0	0	0	0
1987–88	Hunslet	20	5	0	0	20
1988–94	Brisbane Broncos	118	5	0	0	20
1995	South Queensland Crushers	9	0	0	0	0
	Total	152	10	0	0	40
Representative
Years	Team	Pld	T	G	FG	P
1993–95	Queensland	9	0	0	0	0
1994	Australia	1	0	0	0	0
- Source: As of 10 November 2023

Mark Hohn (/ˈhoʊn/; born 29 January 1964) is an Australian former rugby league footballer who played in the 1980s and 1990s. A front-rower, he represented Queensland in the State of Origin on nine occasions and played one Test for Australia as a reserve forward against France in mid-1994. Hohn played club football in Australia for the Fortitude Valley Diehards, Brisbane Broncos and South Queensland Crushers, and in England for Hunslet.

== Biography ==
While attending Pittsworth State High School, Hohn played for the Australian Schoolboys team in 1981. He started his career with the Pittsworth Danes before moving to the Brisbane Rugby League premiership to play with the Fortitude Valley Diehards. Hohn also spent a season with Wigan (1986–87). He joined the Brisbane Broncos upon their foundation in 1988, playing in their first ever match and going on to feature in the club's first and second premiership wins in 1992 and 1993. In the weeks following the 1992 Grand Final, Hohn travelled with the Broncos to England, where he played at second-row forward in the 1992 World Club Challenge against British champions Wigan, helping Brisbane become the first NSWRL club to win the match in Britain

After playing in the Broncos' grand final winning team again in 1993, Hohn also made his Queensland and Australian representative debuts in 1994, becoming the oldest Australian forward (at the age of 30) to make his Test début in the process. During the 1994 NSWRL season, Hohn played at second-row forward for defending premiers Brisbane when they hosted British champions Wigan for the 1994 World Club Challenge.

During the mid-1990s' Super League war Hohn left the Brisbane club to join cross-town ARL rivals, the South Queensland Crushers where he played out the remainder of his career.
