= Allan Langer =

Australian international rugby league footballer

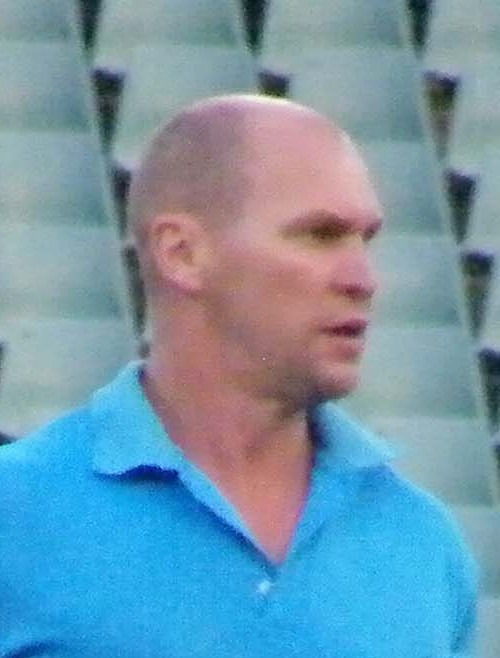
- Langer in 2009

Personal information
- Full name: Allan Jeffrey Langer
- Born: 30 July 1966 (age 60) Ipswich, Queensland, Australia

Playing information
- Height: 165 cm (5 ft 5 in)
- Weight: 76 kg (12 st 0 lb)
- Position: Halfback
Club
Years	Team	Pld	T	G	FG	P
1986–87	Ipswich Jets	25	6	4	1	33
1988–99	Brisbane Broncos	240	95	8	6	402
2000–01	Warrington Wolves	55	16	4	0	72
2002	Brisbane Broncos	18	5	0	0	20
	Total	338	122	16	7	527
Representative
Years	Team	Pld	T	G	FG	P
1987–02	Queensland	34	10	0	1	41
1997	Queensland (SL)	3	1	0	0	4
1988–99	Australia	24	5	0	0	20
1997	Australia (SL)	1	0	0	0	0

Allan Jeffrey "Alfie" Langer AM (born 30 July 1966) is an Australian former rugby league footballer who played in the 1980s, 1990s and 2000s and worked as an assistant coach for the Australian national team, the Queensland Maroons and the Brisbane Broncos.

He was one of the pre-eminent halfbacks of his era, representing Australia on many occasions and holding the record for most State of Origin appearances, until being surpassed by his club, state and country team-mate Darren Lockyer. Langer played most of his career as captain of the Brisbane Broncos, with whom he won the 1992 Clive Churchill Medal and Rothmans Medal, as well as four premierships and the club's player of the year award a record five times. The Allan Langer Medal, which is the Ipswich Jets' player of the year award was named in his honour. Alfie's Bar at the Broncos Leagues Club is also named after him.

== Early life ==
The youngest of Queensland Rail worker Harry and mother Rita Langer's four sons, Allan Langer was born in Ipswich, Queensland on 30 July 1966. He attended Ipswich State High School.

He grew up playing football at Ipswich's Northern Suburbs Tigers alongside his brothers and future Brisbane Broncos (as well as Queensland Maroons and Australian Kangaroos) teammates Kevin and Kerrod Walters. This combination of players would become known as "The Ipswich Connection".

== Playing career ==
Langer was selected as an Australian rugby league schoolboy representative in 1982.

=== 1980s ===
Coached at the Ipswich Jets by Australian former international halfback Tommy Raudonikis, Langer was playing first grade when he was only 17 in the Brisbane Rugby League premiership by 1986. He played as a halfback for Ipswich and in 1987 opposed his older brother Kevin, who was halfback of Wests. That year his selection from left field for the Wayne Bennett-coached Queensland side in the 1987 State of Origin series was questioned by several key figures in the Maroons camp who called for the selection of in-form Eastern Suburbs halfback Laurie Spina. It was Raudonikis who stood up for him, backing Langer's selection and he made his Queensland début in the 1987 State of Origin series while still playing for the Jets. Paul Vautin claimed in his autobiography that during a team meeting, Bennett kept going on about where they were going to hide Langer in defence. He was upset that no-one was defending him against Bennett's comments and so stood up and said "He's a Queenslander and won't let us down". Langer's superb performance, including a man-of-the-match award in the decider, silenced the critics and saw him signed on with the newly established Brisbane Broncos team who would enter the New South Wales Rugby League premiership in 1988.

Coached by Bennett and captained under Wally Lewis at the Broncos, Langer developed further skill with the ball and learnt much from his mentors, and his two tries in Game I of the 1988 State of Origin series saw him named Man of the Match again. He scored tries in the other two Origin fixtures as well. On the 2nd Ashes Test of the 1988 Great Britain Lions tour which was played at Lang Park, on the electronic scoreboard the message "Bullfrog - shame our favourite No 7 isn't here" was displayed in a reference to Langer being overlooked for selection by Kangaroos team manager Peter Moore in favour of Peter Sterling. Langer made his début for the Australian test side against Papua New Guinea due to a shoulder injury to Sterling. This made him the first Bronco to earn international representative honours. On 20 July 1988 Langer played for Australia in their record 62-point win over Papua New Guinea, scoring two tries. At the end of the 1988 NSWRL season Langer was named the Broncos' player of the year, then went on to score two tries in Australia's win in the 1988 World Cup final over New Zealand.

Langer played in the Broncos' win in the final of the 1989 Panasonic Cup before suffering a broken ankle in Game 2 of the 1989 State of Origin series, Langer missed the rest of the 1989 season.

=== 1990s ===
Langer's leg recovered to go on the 1990 Kangaroo tour. following the axing of Lewis from the Broncos and later the retirement of Gene Miles, the diminutive Langer became captain of the Broncos in 1992. Alfie then played in all three matches of the 1992 State of Origin series, scoring one try and kicking the match-winning field goal in Game II. He also won the Wally Lewis Medal for being the best player in the Match. He helped Australia retain The Ashes during the 1992 Great Britain Lions tour of Australia and New Zealand and also won the Rothmans Medal for best and fairest player in the Winfield Cup competition that season.

For Langer to play as he did, after a week of hearing how St George must stop him, confirms he deserves to be talked about with Peter Sterling and Wally Lewis as one of the three best players of the past decade.

— The Sydney Morning Herald, 27 September 1992

Along with Steve Renouf, Langer was the year's top try scorer for the Broncos. He also steered his team to their maiden Premiership, winning the Clive Churchill Medal for best and fairest player on the field in the grand final.

Later in the year Langer also played in Australia's 1992 Rugby League World Cup Final victory, and captained the Broncos to victory in the 1992 World Club Challenge, the first time Australian premiers had won the title on British soil. By this time Allan Langer's fame was such that he starred with his mother in the advertising campaign for Australia's top-selling bread and also had his own doll on toy store shelves.

The following season saw Langer again lead the Broncos to a Premiership, the first time a team which had finished 5th in the regular season had gone on to win the competition.

The years 1994–1996 were characterised by successive failures by the Broncos to win the Australian Rugby League Premiership. During the 1994 NSWRL season, Langer played as a halfback for defending premiers Brisbane when they hosted British champions Wigan for the 1994 World Club Challenge and lost. Langer then lost his position in the test squad to Ricky Stuart after an opening loss to Great Britain in the Ashes series of the 1994 Kangaroo tour.

In 1995, Langer, along with many other high-profile players, lost their representative positions because they had signed contracts to play for the newly formed Super League. However Langer won the Broncos' player of the year award every year from 1993 to 1996. He was also made captain of the Queensland State of Origin team in 1996 and was named by Rugby League Week as that season's player of the year.

Langer again captained the Broncos to victory in the 1997 World Club Championship and the Super League premiership. In the first game of the 1998 State of Origin series Langer was named man-of-the-match. Also that year, for the second time, Langer captained the Broncos to a second consecutive premiership when they won the 1998 NRL grand final. In 1998, Langer was also appointed Australian national team captain. That year he and his mentor, Broncos, Queensland and Australian coach, Wayne Bennett, became the first captain-coach combination to win the NRL Premiership, State of Origin and Test series in the same year. Langer's 1998 season has since been described as one of the greatest individual seasons in Australian rugby league history.

After a lacklustre start to the 1999 season, Langer announced his immediate retirement from rugby league mid-year, leaving many, including teammates, bewildered as to why. His departure prompted the Queensland Premier and even the Australian Prime Minister to eulogise his contribution to the sport. However, Alfie soon came out of retirement to play in the Super League for the Warrington Wolves.

=== 2000s ===
Langer captained Warrington Wolves and took them to within one match of the Challenge Cup Final in 2000. Also in 2000, Langer was honoured as a Member of the Order of Australia "for service to Rugby League football as a player at national and international levels, and as a supporter of charities, particularly those raising funds for cancer research". Later that year he was also awarded the Australian Sports Medal.

As coach of the Maroons for the 2001 State of Origin series, Wayne Bennett made a surprise selection of Langer – then still playing in England – for the Queensland side in the third and deciding match. His comeback was arranged by Bennett under a shroud of secrecy. There were doubts as to whether Langer, in the twilight of his playing career, would be able to withstand the physical rigours of State of Origin football. Some Sydney journalists, such as Phil Gould, questioned the state of Queensland's football talent, given that they had needed to "bring back 35-year-olds to win." However, on the night Langer set up two tries and scored one himself, leading Queensland to victory only a year after they had suffered their worst ever State of Origin defeat.

Langer was subsequently lured back to the Broncos for one final season in 2002. In doing so he became the NRL's oldest player that year at 36 years and 60 days. He was named man-of-the-match in the third and deciding game of that year's State of Origin series and became the oldest player to play in State of Origin football. However, despite his good form, Brisbane were unable to win the Premiership, falling four points short of the Grand Final (losing the preliminary final to eventual premiers the Sydney Roosters by a scoreline of just 16-12).

At the time of his retirement, Langer had made the most appearances as captain for the Brisbane Broncos and became only the third player to have been named man-of-the-match in a State of Origin game more than three times.

== Post-playing ==
After playing Langer spent time as a restaurateur in Queensland.

In 2003 Langer was one of the first four former players inducted into the Broncos official Hall of Fame. That year he considered another comeback with the Caloundra Sharks, who his older brother Kevin was coaching. During the 2007 season at the Broncos' 20-year anniversary celebration, the club announced a list of the 20 best players to play for them to date which included Langer.

In February 2008, Langer was named in the list of Australia's 100 Greatest Players (1908–2007) which was commissioned by the NRL and ARL to celebrate the code's centenary year in Australia. Langer was also inducted into the Sport Australia Hall of Fame in 2008. In June 2008, he was chosen in the Queensland Rugby League's Team of the Century as a halfback.

A few months later the Brisbane Broncos appointed Allan Langer, along with Shane Webcke as full-time assistant coaches to work alongside new head coach Ivan Henjak from the 2009 season.

He has also been named as a Queensland Maroons' assistant coach under Mal Meninga for the 2009 State of Origin series. In 2009, Langer could frequently be seen running water out to Broncos players during NRL matches, and even for Australia at the end of season Four Nations tournament.

In 2009 as part of the Q150 celebrations, Allan Langer was announced as one of the Q150 Icons of Queensland for his role as a "sports legend".

=== Drink Driving Charge ===
On 29 March 2010, Langer was charged with drink driving. At the time of the incident, Langer was ambassador for Lion Nathan brewery. He went to the Normanby Hotel in inner Brisbane, where he was photographed dancing in his underpants in front of patrons. Langer drank 8 to 10 glasses of beer and a couple of vodkas, before driving his car. He had intended to drive all the way to his home on the Sunshine Coast, but a police patrol pulled him over in the Brisbane suburb of Everton Park. The police found Langer to be 3 times over the legal blood alcohol limit. Langer pleaded guilty to the offence in Brisbane Magistrates Court. Lion Nathan cancelled Langer's brewery ambassadorship, and he was suspended from his coaching position with the Broncos. The court banned Langer from driving a motor vehicle for eight months. However no criminal conviction was recorded, as the judge accepted Langer's argument that a conviction would hurt his football coaching career. By the following weekend Langer had returned to work as Broncos assistant coach.

=== Gambling ===
In 2015 Langer admitted he struggled with a gambling addiction for most of his career. "It is one of those things where you look back and wish you had never done it," he said.

== Personal life ==
Langer is married to his high school sweetheart Janine. They have three children. In 2009 he became a grandfather.

== Footnotes ==
Preceded by Geoff Toovey	Australian national rugby league captain 1998	Succeeded by Gorden Tallis
