= 1986 Brisbane Rugby League season =

1986 Brisbane Rugby League
- Duration: March 30 – September 21, 1986
- Teams: 9
- Premiers: Wynnum-Manly
- Minor premiers: Wynnum-Manly
- Matches played: 76
- Points scored: 2600
- Player of the year: Bryan Niebling & Scott Tronc (Rothmans Medal)

The 1986 Brisbane Rugby League premiership was the 77th season of Brisbane's professional rugby league football competition. Nine teams from across Brisbane competed for the premiership, which culminated in a grand final match between the Wynnum-Manly and Past Brothers clubs. The season was notable as premiers Wynnum-Manly became the first club to complete a "grand slam" of all four major titles in a single BRL season, winning the pre-season competition, the Winfield State League, the Woolies Trophy (contested between the two sides leading the Winfield premiership at the end of the first round-robin), and the Winfield Cup premiership itself.

== Season summary ==
The format of the Winfield Cup was changed for the 1986 season, with the pre-season games no longer awarding competition points. The first round of the regular season was played on March 30, after the pre-season but before the Winfield State League. Each club then played either 3 or 4 games against another Brisbane side during the State League, followed by the remaining 13 games of the regular season. This resulted in each team playing 16 first-grade games over 18 rounds. The inclusion of the Ipswich Jets, the first team to join the BRL since Wynnum-Manly rejoined in 1951, resulted in the reintroduction of the bye. Teams that played three first-grade games during the State League received one bye in the regular season, while those that played four times received two (excluding byes for the Woolies Trophy contested between Valleys and Wynnum-Manly). The season resulted in a top four of Wynnum-Manly, Redcliffe, Past Brothers and Fortitude Valley.

=== Teams ===
Club	Home ground	Coach	Captain
Eastern Suburbs	Langlands Park	Wayne Lindenberg	Larry Brigginshaw
Fortitude Valley	Neumann Oval	Peter McWhirter	Michael Booth
Ipswich	North Ipswich Reserve	Tommy Raudonikis	Glen Haggarth
Northern Suburbs	Bishop Park	Greg Oliphant	Craig Grauf
Past Brothers	Corbett Park	Ross Strudwick	Trevor Bailey
Redcliffe	Dolphin Oval	Darryl Van de Velde	Mark Murray
Southern Suburbs	Davies Park	Graeme Atherton	Norm Carr
Western Suburbs	Purtell Park	Trevor Day	Tony Currie
Wynnum-Manly	Kougari Oval	Wally Lewis	Wally Lewis

=== Pre-season ===
The 1986 Woolies pre-season competition took place over 5 rounds, from February 14 to March 16. Four pre-season competition points were available in each match, with one point going to the side that scored the most points in each half and two points to the winning side. Unlike previous years, no points for the regular season were awarded for wins in the pre-season competition. The pre-season final was held on March 23, between Wynnum-Manly and Brothers. The Brethren were without captain Trevor Bailey, who would also miss the Winfield State League and five rounds of the regular season. Centre Robert Grogan captained Brothers in Bailey's absence against a Wally Lewis captain-coached Wynnum-Manly side, scoring the first try of the match to give the Brethen a 4-2 lead at halftime. Wynnum-Manly would ultimately win the final 10-8 after tries from Scott Lewis and Craig Farrugia.

==== Results ====
Team	1	2	3	4	5	F1	F2
Eastern Suburbs Tigers	NOR -22	VAL -19	X	BRO -10	RED -16		
Fortitude Valley Diehards	X	EST +19	IPW +30	WYN -4	SOU +1	BRO -2	
Ipswich Jets	X	BRO -18	VAL -30	SOU -22	WYN -16		
Northern Suburbs Devils	EST +22	X	RED -10	WST +6	BRO -22		
Past Brothers	X	IPW +18	SOU +11	EST +10	NOR +22	VAL +2	WYN -2
Redcliffe Dolphins	WST -10	WYN +13	NOR +10	X	EST +16	WYN -7	
Southern Suburbs Magpies	X	WST +19	BRO -11	IPW +22	VAL -1		
Western Suburbs Panthers	RED +10	SOU -19	WYN -20	NOR -6	X		
Wynnum-Manly Seagulls	X	RED -13	WST +20	VAL +4	IPW +16	RED +7	BRO +2
Team	1	2	3	4	5	F1	F2

==== Ladder ====
	Team	Pld	W	D	L	B	PF	PA	PD	Pts
1	Past Brothers	4	4	0	0	1	101	40	+61	16.5
2	Wynnum-Manly (P)	4	3	0	1	1	72	47	+25	14.5
3	Fortitude Valley	4	3	0	1	1	92	46	+46	13.5
4	Redcliffe	4	3	0	1	1	59	30	+29	12.5
5	Southern Suburbs	4	2	0	2	1	73	44	+29	12
6	Northern Suburbs	4	2	0	2	1	62	66	-4	9
7	Western Suburbs	4	1	0	3	1	38	71	-33	7
8	Eastern Suburbs	4	0	0	4	1	28	95	-67	3
9	Ipswich	4	0	0	4	1	42	128	-86	2

=== Regular season results ===
Team	1	ST1	ST2	ST3	ST4	ST5	ST6	6	7	8	9	10	11	12	WT	13	14	15	16	17	18	F1	F2	GF
Eastern Suburbs Tigers	IPW +6	SOU -18	NOR +20	Y	WYN -26	Y	WST -2	BRO -2	RED +8	VAL -14	X	WST -7	NOR -24	SOU +6	X	WYN -34	IPW +4	BRO -40	RED -28	VAL -14	X			
Fortitude Valley Diehards	X	Y	RED +10	BRO +14	WST +14	Y	NOR -4	WYN +8	SOU +36	EST +14	IPW +10	RED -10	WST +6	BRO -5	WYN -16	NOR -12	X	WYN -18	SOU -4	EST +14	IPW +24	BRO -2		
Ipswich Jets	EST -6	Y	WST +9	NOR +19	Y	RED -12	Y	SOU +8	WYN -16	BRO -28	VAL -10	X	RED -28	NOR -19	X	WST +12	EST -4	SOU -2	WYN -32	BRO -22	VAL -24			
Northern Suburbs Devils	WYN -20	Y	EST -20	IPW -19	Y	SOU +10	VAL +4	WST +20	BRO -34	X	RED -11	SOU -1	EST +24	IPW +19	X	VAL +12	WYN -7	WST +4	BRO -14	X	RED -14			
Past Brothers	WST +14	WYN -12	Y	VAL -14	RED -34	Y	Y	EST +2	NOR +34	IPW +28	SOU -7	WYN -8	X	VAL +5	X	RED -3	WST +12	EST +40	NOR +14	IPW +22	SOU +8	VAL +2	RED +12	WYN -8
Redcliffe Dolphins	SOU +5	WST +2	VAL -10	Y	BRO +34	IPW +12	Y	X	EST -8	WYN +20	NOR +11	VAL +10	IPW +28	WST +28	X	BRO +3	SOU +20	X	EST +28	WYN -7	NOR +14	WYN -20	BRO -12	
Southern Suburbs Magpies	RED -5	EST +18	Y	WYN -2	Y	NOR -10	Y	IPW -8	VAL -36	WST -26	BRO +7	NOR +1	WYN -20	EST -6	X	X	RED -20	IPW +2	VAL +4	WST +14	BRO -8			
Western Suburbs Panthers	BRO -14	RED -2	IPW -9	Y	VAL -14	Y	EST +2	NOR -20	X	SOU +26	WYN -22	EST +7	VAL -6	RED -28	X	IPW -12	BRO -12	NOR -4	X	SOU -14	WYN -18			
Wynnum-Manly Seagulls	NOR +20	BRO +12	Y	SOU +2	EST +26	Y	Y	VAL -8	IPW +16	RED -20	WST +22	BRO +8	SOU +20	X	VAL +16	EST +34	NOR +7	VAL +18	IPW +32	RED +7	WST +18	RED +20	X	BRO +8
Team	1	ST1	ST2	ST3	ST4	ST5	ST6	6	7	8	9	10	11	12	WT	13	14	15	16	17	18	F1	F2	GF

- X - Bye
- Y - Team played a non-first grade State League match
- Opponent for round listed above margin

=== Ladder ===
	Team	Pld	W	D	L	B	PF	PA	PD	Pts
1	Wynnum-Manly (P)	16	13	1	3	2	385	185	+200	30
2	Redcliffe	16	13	0	3	2	365	175	+190	30
3	Past Brothers	16	10	0	6	2	332	231	+101	24
4	Fortitude Valley	16	10	0	6	2	309	212	+97	24
5	Northern Suburbs	16	8	0	8	2	222	255	-33	20
6	Southern Suburbs	16	6	1	10	2	236	331	-95	16
7	Eastern Suburbs	16	5	1	11	2	217	382	-165	14
8	Ipswich	16	4	0	12	2	234	391	-157	12
9	Western Suburbs	16	3	0	13	2	214	352	-138	10

=== Woolies Trophy ===
The 1986 Woolies Trophy match was held on July 13, between rounds 12 and 13 of the regular season. The Trophy was contested by Wynnum-Manly and Fortitude Valley, the teams that led the competition after the end of round 9, with the other sides having an extra bye.

==== Match details ====
1986 Woolies Trophy

13 July 1986

Wynnum-Manly Seagulls	20 – 4	Fortitude Valley Diehards
Tries: 4 S Lewis 3'; G Miles 11'; B Lindner 47'; B Naylor 66'; Goals: 2 C Scott 11', 26'	1st: 12 – 4; 2nd: 8 – 0	Goals: 2 M Booth 8', 20'

Lang Park, Brisbane
Referee: Eddie Ward

== Finals ==
Home	Score	Away	Match Information
Home	Score	Away	Date and Time	Venue	Referee	Crowd
Semi-finals
Past Brothers	10-8	Fortitude Valley	31 August 1986	Lang Park	Eddie Ward	8,000
Wynnum-Manly	26-6	Redcliffe	7 September 1986	Lang Park	Ian Irwin
Preliminary Final
Past Brothers	14-2	Redcliffe	14 September 1986	Lang Park	David Manson	8,000
Grand Final
Wynnum-Manly	14-6	Past Brothers	21 September 1986	Lang Park	Eddie Ward	25,000

== Grand Final ==
1986 BRL Grand Final

21 September 1986

Wynnum-Manly Seagulls	14 – 6	Past Brothers
Tries: 2 W Lewis 68'; P Attell 75'; Goals: 3/5; C Scott 7', 9', 59'	1st: 4 – 6; 2nd: 10 – 0	Tries: 1 P Gill 24'; Goals: 1/1; T Bailey 24'

Lang Park, Brisbane
Attendance: 22,500
Referee: Eddie Ward
Player of the Match: Steve Carter

Brothers	Position	Wynnum Manly
1. Clinton Mohr	FB	1. Colin Scott
2. Vince O'Brien	WG	2. Scott Lewis
3. Robert Grogan	CE	3. Brent Naylor
14. John Tapp	CE	4. Gene Miles
4. Jeff Burns	WG	5. Scott Nichols
6. Peter Gill	FE	6. Wally Lewis (C./C.)
7. Greg Smith	HB	7. Peter Dawes
8. Dan Stains	LK	8. Bob Lindner
9. Shane McErLean	SR	9.Ian French
10. Gary Smith	SR	10. Mel Green
11. Ray Baumber	PR	11. Darryl Jenner
12. Trevor Bailey (c)	HK	12. Craig Farrugia
13. Steve Carter	PR	13. Greg Dowling
5. Joe Kilroy	Reserve	Phil Attell
16. B Williams	Reserve	R Rateri
Ross Strudwick	Coach	Wally Lewis

== Winfield State League ==
The 1986 Winfield State League was the inaugural season of the Queensland Rugby League's statewide competition. A total of 14 teams competed in the season, 8 of which were BRL Premiership clubs. The remaining six were regional teams from across the state, hence the State League name. The Seagulls would pull off a massive victory in the semi-finals against Ipswich, before defeating Redcliffe by a large margin in the Grand Final to win their third consecutive Winfield State League title.
