= 1987 Brisbane Rugby League season =

1987 Brisbane Rugby League
- Duration: March 1 – September 20, 1987
- Teams: 9
- Premiers: Past Brothers
- Minor premiers: Past Brothers
- Matches played: 76
- Points scored: 2898
- Player of the year: Gene Miles

The 1987 Brisbane Rugby League premiership was the 77th season of Brisbane's professional rugby league football competition. Nine teams from across Brisbane competed for the premiership, which culminated in a grand final match between the Redcliffe and Past Brothers clubs.

== Season summary ==
The format of the Winfield Cup was changed once again for the 1987 season, with games between Brisbane sides in the Winfield State League no longer granting competition points for the regular season. Instead, rounds 2 to 5 of the Woolies Pre-Season Competition were once again treated as first-grade games (Round 1, in which only 2 games were played, did not give competition points).

Teams played each other twice, with 18 rounds of competition played. It resulted in a top four of Past Brothers, Northern Suburbs, Redcliffe and Wynnum-Manly. The 1987 season is significant as most Rugby League historians view it as the final season of the BRL as a true top-tier competition, as the entry of the Brisbane Broncos and Gold Coast Giants into the NSWRL Premiership in 1988 devastated the BRL by stripping it of mainstream media coverage and players.

=== Teams ===
Club	Home ground	Coach	Captain
Eastern Suburbs	Langlands Park	Shane McNally	Ian Stains
Ipswich	North Ipswich Reserve	Tommy Raudonikis	Glen Haggarth
Northern Suburbs	Bishop Park	Greg Oliphant	Darryl Duncan
Past Brothers	Corbett Park	Ross Strudwick	Trevor Bailey
Redcliffe	Dolphin Oval	Darryl Van de Velde	~~Bryan Niebling~~ → Steve Bleakley
Seagulls-Diehards	Neumann Oval	Peter McWhirter	~~Steve Hegarty~~ → Mark Hohn
Southern Suburbs	Davies Park	Graeme Atherton	Gary French
Western Suburbs	Purtell Park	Peter Foreman	~~Kevin Langer~~ → Darren Gilbert
Wynnum-Manly	Kougari Oval	Wally Lewis	Wally Lewis

=== Pre-season ===
The 1987 Woolies pre-season competition took place over 5 rounds, from February 22 to March 22. Four competition points were available in each match, with one point going to the side that scored the most points in each half and two points to the winning side. Winfield Cup competition points were also available for teams that won games in rounds 2 through 5 of the pre-season. The pre-season final was held on March 29, between Brothers and Norths, both teams that had won all of their pre-season matches. The Brethren were without captain Trevor Bailey, who would also miss the Winfield State League and two rounds of the regular season. Second-row forward Gary Smith captained Brothers in Bailey's absence, the side winning 18–4 after taking the lead in the 33rd minute.

==== Results ====
Team	1	2	3	4	5	F1	F2
Eastern Suburbs Tigers	X	BRO -34	SOU -12	RED -28	WST +2		
Ipswich Jets	BRO -2	X	WST +22	VAL +6	NOR -6	BRO -10	
Northern Suburbs Devils	X	SOU +10	RED +12	WST +14	IPW +6	WYN +3	BRO -14
Past Brothers	IPW +2	EST +34	WYN +4	X	VAL +14	IPW +10	NOR +14
Redcliffe Dolphins	X	WST +3	NOR -12	EST +28	WYN -24		
Seagulls-Diehards	SOU +14	WYN -10	X	IPW -6	BRO -14		
Southern Suburbs Magpies	VAL -14	NOR -10	EST +12	WYN -14	X		
Western Suburbs Panthers	X	RED -3	IPW -22	NOR -14	EST -2		
Wynnum-Manly Seagulls	X	VAL +10	BRO -4	SOU +14	RED +24	NOR -3	
Team	1	2	3	4	5	F1	F2

==== Ladder ====
	Team	Pld	W	D	L	B	PF	PA	PD	Pts
1	Northern Suburbs	4	4	0	0	1	108	66	+42	16.5
2	Past Brothers (P)	4	4	0	0	1	106	52	+54	16
3	Wynnum-Manly	4	3	0	1	1	88	44	+44	13
4	Ipswich	4	2	0	2	1	70	50	+20	10.5
5	Redcliffe	4	2	0	2	1	78	83	-5	10
6	Seagulls-Diehards	4	1	0	3	1	66	82	-16	8.5
7	Eastern Suburbs	4	1	0	3	1	46	118	-72	6.5
8	Southern Suburbs	4	1	0	3	1	70	96	-26	5.5
9	Western Suburbs	4	0	0	4	1	33	74	-41	3.5

=== Regular season results ===
Team	P2	P3	P4	P5	5	6	7	8	9	10	11	12	13	14	15	16	17	18	F1	F2	GF
Eastern Suburbs Tigers	BRO -34	SOU -12	RED -28	WST +2	NOR -4	IPW -16	WYN -28	X	VAL -52	BRO -50	SOU -40	RED -30	WST -2	NOR -30	IPW -22	WYN -10	X	VAL -2			
Ipswich Jets	X	WST +22	VAL +6	NOR -6	BRO -12	EST +16	SOU -4	WYN -16	RED +14	X	WST +14	VAL +2	NOR -4	BRO -28	EST +22	SOU +2	WYN -16	RED -2			
Northern Suburbs Devils	SOU +10	RED +12	WST +14	IPW +6	EST +4	WYN +12	X	VAL +7	BRO -8	SOU 0	RED -18	WST +16	IPW +4	EST +30	WYN +10	X	VAL +2	BRO -10	BRO -9	RED -8	
Past Brothers	EST +34	WYN +4	X	VAL +14	IPW +12	SOU -4	RED -22	WST +36	NOR +8	EST +50	WYN -4	X	VAL +9	IPW +28	SOU +24	RED +12	WST +4	NOR +10	NOR +9	X	RED +18
Redcliffe Dolphins	WST +3	NOR -12	EST +28	WYN -24	X	VAL +12	BRO +22	SOU +13	IPW -14	WST +44	NOR +18	EST +30	WYN -5	X	VAL +3	BRO -12	SOU +36	IPW +2	WYN +23	NOR +8	BRO -18
Seagulls-Diehards	WYN -10	X	IPW -6	BRO -14	SOU +21	RED -12	WST +38	NOR -7	EST +52	WYN +9	X	IPW -2	BRO -9	SOU -6	RED -3	WST +16	NOR -2	EST +2			
Southern Suburbs Magpies	NOR -10	EST +12	WYN -14	X	VAL -21	BRO +4	IPW +4	RED -13	WST +34	NOR 0	EST +40	WYN +5	X	VAL +6	BRO -24	IPW -2	RED -36	WST +14			
Western Suburbs Panthers	RED -3	IPW -22	NOR -14	EST -2	WYN -31	X	VAL -38	BRO -36	SOU -34	RED -44	IPW -14	NOR -16	EST +2	WYN -10	X	VAL -16	BRO -4	SOU -14			
Wynnum-Manly Seagulls	VAL +10	BRO -4	SOU +14	RED +24	WST +31	NOR -12	EST +28	IPW +16	X	VAL -9	BRO +4	SOU -5	RED +5	WST +10	NOR -10	EST +10	IPW +16	X	RED -23		
Team	P2	P3	P4	P5	5	6	7	8	9	10	11	12	13	14	15	16	17	18	F1	F2	GF

- X - Bye
- Y - Team played a non-first grade State League match
- Opponent for round listed above margin

=== Ladder ===
	Team	Pld	W	D	L	B	PF	PA	PD	Pts
1	Past Brothers (P)	16	13	0	3	2	442	227	+215	30
2	Northern Suburbs	16	12	1	3	2	340	249	+91	29
3	Redcliffe	16	11	0	5	2	404	262	+142	26
4	Wynnum-Manly	16	11	0	5	2	354	226	+128	26
5	Southern Suburbs	16	8	1	7	2	311	310	+1	21
6	Ipswich	16	8	0	8	2	325	315	+10	20
7	Seagulls-Diehards	16	6	0	10	2	373	304	+69	16
8	Western Suburbs	16	1	0	15	2	164	462	-298	6
9	Eastern Suburbs	16	1	0	15	2	185	543	-358	6

=== Woolies Trophy ===
The 1987 Woolies Trophy match was held on August 2, as part of round 15 of the regular season. The Trophy was contested by Northern Suburbs and Wynnum-Manly, the teams that led the competition after the end of round 9.

==== Match details ====
1987 Woolies Trophy

2 August 1987

Northern Suburbs	22 – 12	Wynnum-Manly Seagulls
Tries: 3 C Grauf 2'; M Booth 12'; G Dowling 64'; Goals: 5 G Harvey 2', 27', 43', 47', 64'	1st: 12 – 12; 2nd: 10 – 0	Tries: 1 C Scott 15'; Goals: 4 B Samuelson 8', 15', 24', 33'

Lang Park, Brisbane
Referee: Eddie Ward

== Finals ==
Home	Score	Away	Match Information
Home	Score	Away	Date and Time	Venue	Referee	Crowd
Semi-finals
Redcliffe	30-7	Wynnum-Manly	30 August 1987	Lang Park	Eddie Ward	9,800
Past Brothers	25-16	Northern Suburbs	6 September 1987	Lang Park	Ian Irwin	7,500
Preliminary Final
Redcliffe	24-16	Northern Suburbs	13 September 1987	Lang Park	Eddie Ward	7,612
Grand Final
Past Brothers	26-8	Redcliffe	20 September 1987	Lang Park	Eddie Ward	25,000

== Grand Final ==
1987 BRL Grand Final

20 September 1987

Past Brothers	26 – 8	Redcliffe
Tries: 5 T Bailey 13'; J Kilroy 31'; M Coyne 39'; T Rea 47'; C Mohr 74'; Goals: 3/5; T Rea 39', 47', 74'	1st: 14 – 0; 2nd: 12 – 8	Tries: 1 J Sandy 71'; Goals: 2/3; B Keogh 43', 71' (2/2); T Benson (0/1)

Lang Park, Brisbane
Attendance: 25,000
Referee: Eddie Ward

Brothers	Position	Redcliffe
1. Clinton Mohr	FB	1. Greg Donnelly
2. Joe Kilroy	WG	2. Shane Knuth
3. Robert Grogan	CE	3. Rohan Teevan
4. Jeff Burns	CE	4. Steve Cherry
5. Mark Coyne	WG	5. Robin Thorne
6. Peter Gill	FE	6. Trevor Benson
7. Greg Smith	HB	7. Jamie Sandy
8. Brett Le Man	LK	8. Steve Bleakley (c)
9. Tony Rea	SR	9. Bob Keogh
10. Gary Smith	SR	10. Ashhley Tupea
11. Steve Carter	PR	11. Brian Niebling
12. Trevor Bailey (c)	HK	12. Greg Conescu
13. Jim Stafford	PR	13. Dave Brown
	Reserve	
	Reserve	
Ross Strudwick	Coach	Darryl Van De Velde

== Winfield State League ==
The 1987 Winfield State League was the inaugural season of the Queensland Rugby League's statewide competition. A total of 14 teams competed in the season, 8 of which were BRL Premiership clubs. The remaining six were regional teams from across the state, hence the State League name. Wynnum Manly, Redcliffe, Brisbane Brothers and Toowoomba were the semi-finalists. Toowoomba were only the second non-Brisbane side to make the state league finals, but lost by 22 points to Wynnum-Manly in the semi-finals. The Seagulls faced Redcliffe in the State League Final for the second year in a row, winning 36–14.
