= 1990 NSWRL season =

Rugby league competition

1990 New South Wales Rugby League premiership
- Teams: 16
- Premiers: Canberra (2nd title)
- Minor premiers: Canberra (1st title)
- Matches played: 183
- Points scored: 6107
- Average attendance: 12,139
- Attendance: 2,209,354
- Top points scorer(s): Mal Meninga (212)
- Wooden spoon: South Sydney Rabbitohs (5th spoon)
- Rothmans Medal: Peter Sterling
- Top try-scorer(s): Mal Meninga (17)

The 1990 New South Wales Rugby League season was the eighty-third season of professional rugby league football in Australia. Sixteen clubs competed for the J J Giltinan Shield and Winfield Cup during the premiership season, which culminated in a grand final between the previous season's premiers, the Canberra Raiders and the Penrith Panthers, who were making their grand final debut.

== Season summary ==
For the 1990 season, the salary cap was introduced in the New South Wales Rugby League premiership. Twenty-two regular season rounds were played from March till August, resulting in a top six of Canberra, Brisbane, Penrith, Manly, Balmain and Newcastle.

Parramatta's halfback Peter Sterling won the official player of the year award, the Rothmans Medal. The Dally M Medal was awarded to Manly's five-eighth Cliff Lyons. Rugby League Week gave their player of the year award to Canberra Raiders centre and captain, Mal Meninga.

The grand finals;

- Canberra Raiders vs Penrith Panthers (Senior Grade)
- Canberra Raiders vs Brisbane Broncos (Reserve Grade)
- Canberra Raiders vs St George Dragons (Under-21s Grade)

The winners in all grades were:

- Canberra Raiders (Senior Grade)
- Brisbane Broncos (Reserve Grade)
- Canberra Raiders (Under-21s Grade)

=== Teams ===
The number of teams competing remained unchanged for the second consecutive year, with sixteen clubs contesting the premiership, including five Sydney-based foundation teams, another six from Sydney, two from greater New South Wales, two from Queensland, and one from the Australian Capital Territory

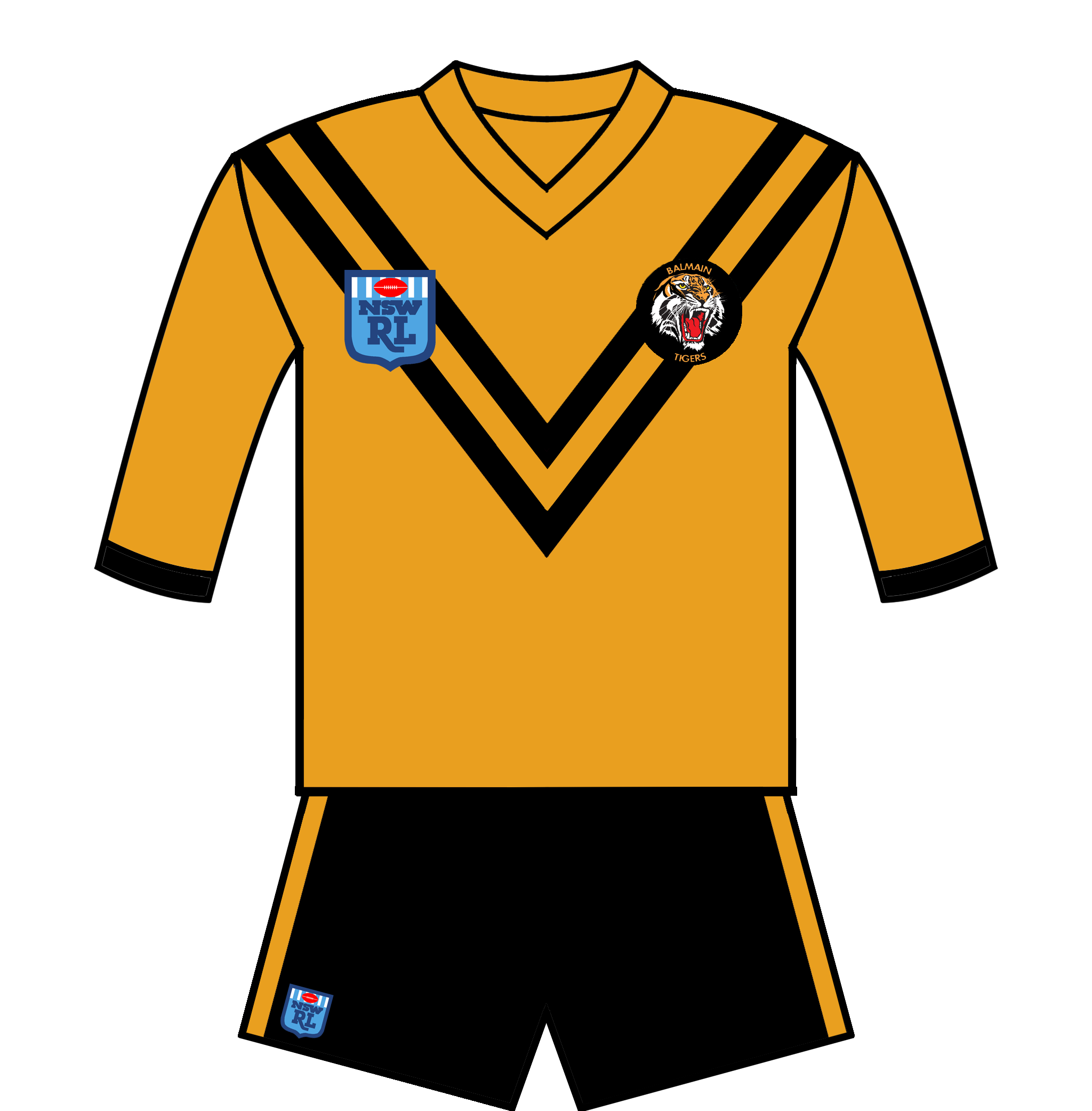
Balmain 83rd season Ground: Leichhardt Oval; Coach: Warren Ryan; Captain: Wayne Pearce

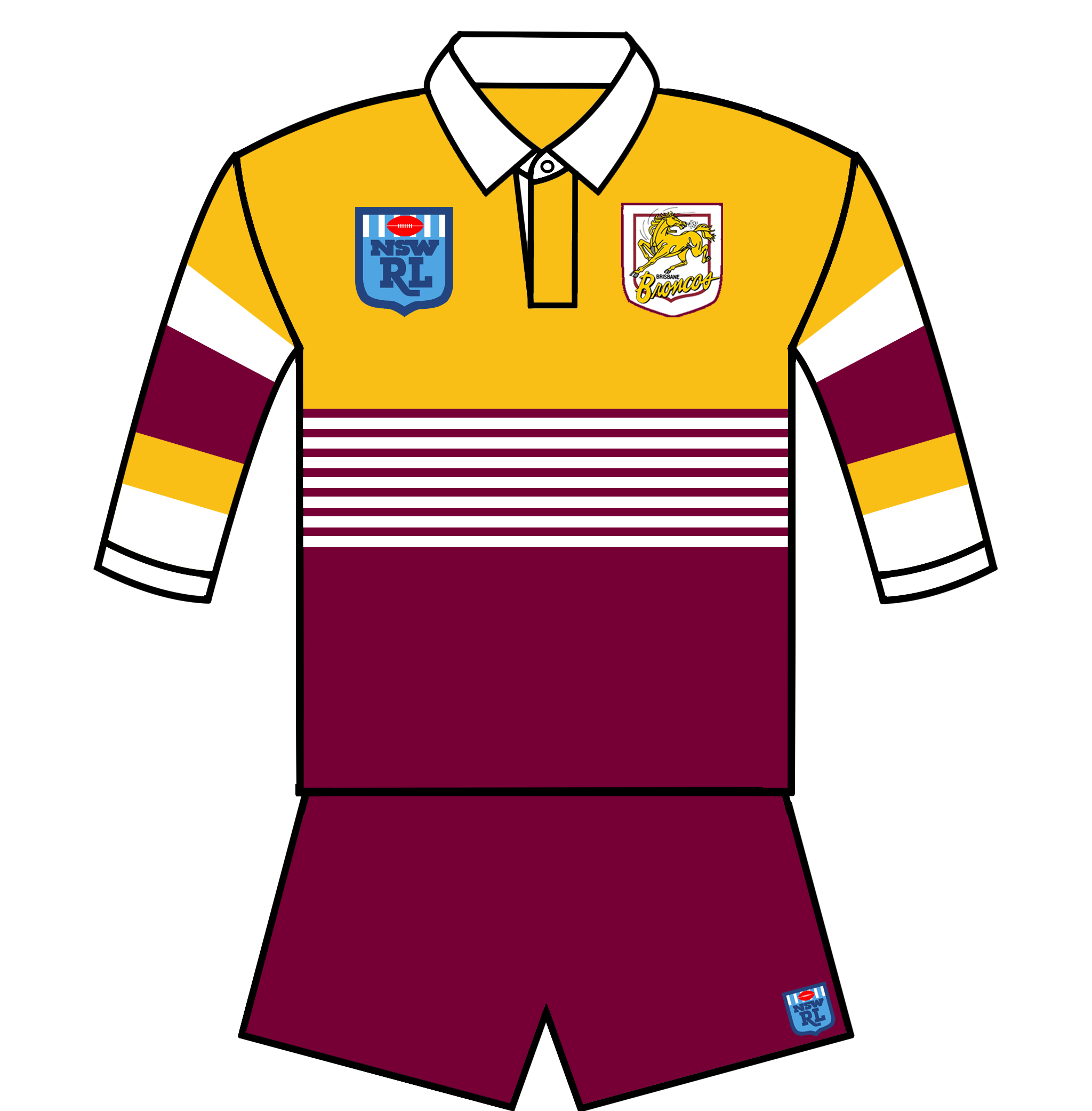
Brisbane 3rd season Ground: Lang Park; Coach: Wayne Bennett; Captain: Gene Miles

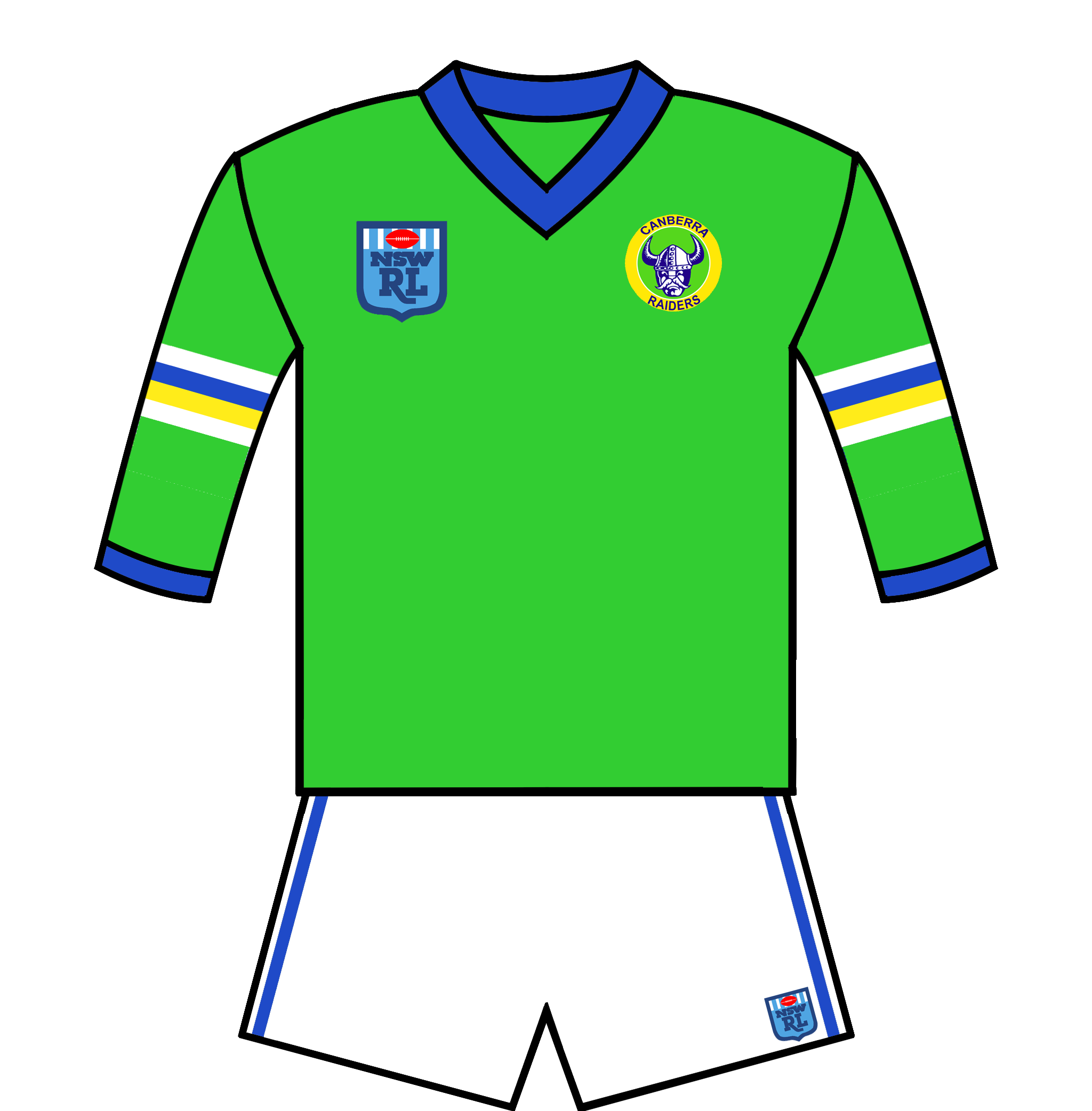
Canberra 9th season Ground: Bruce Stadium; Coach: Tim Sheens; Captain: Mal Meninga

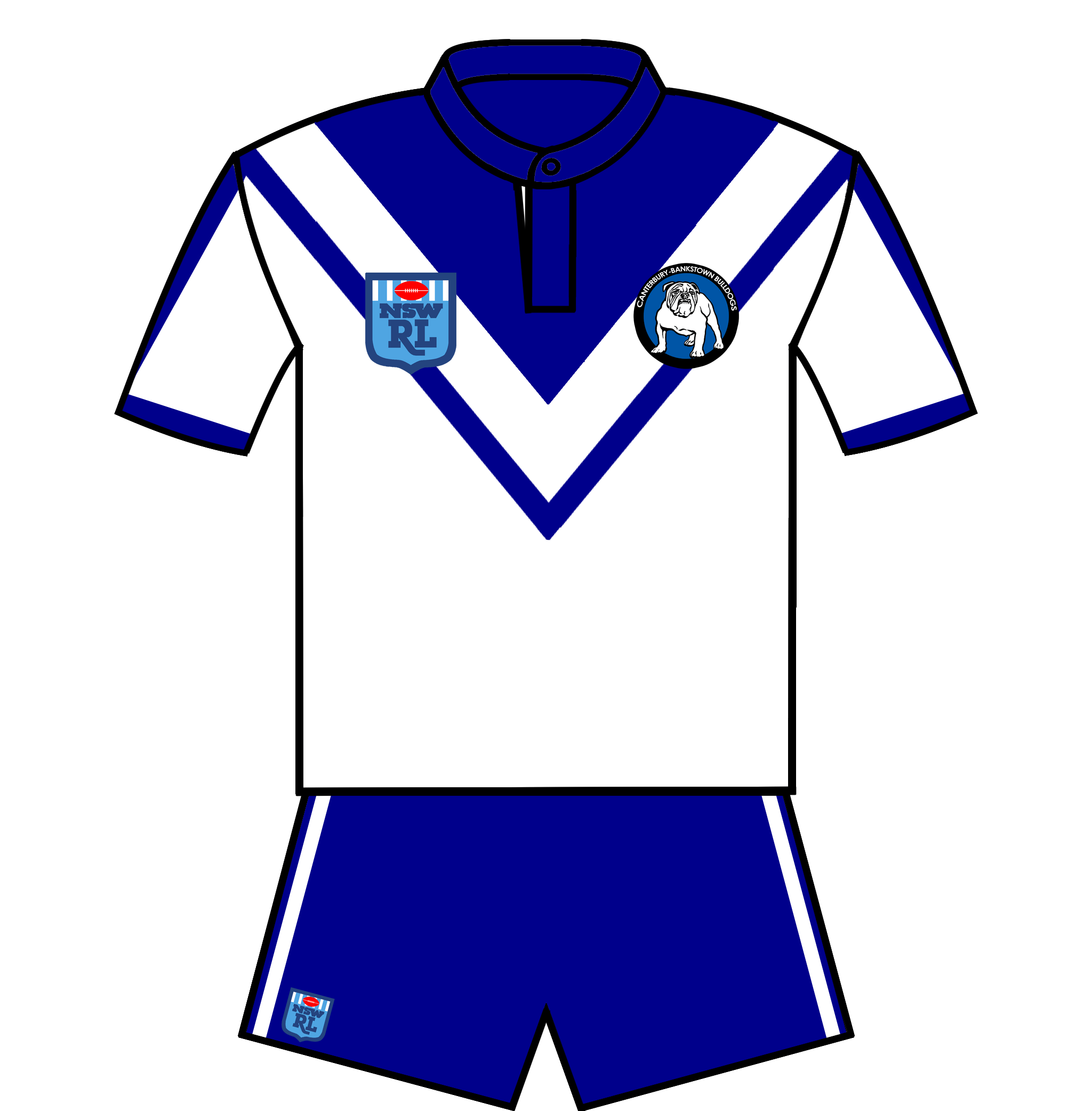
Canterbury 56th season Ground: Belmore Sports Ground; Coach: Chris Anderson; Captain: Terry Lamb

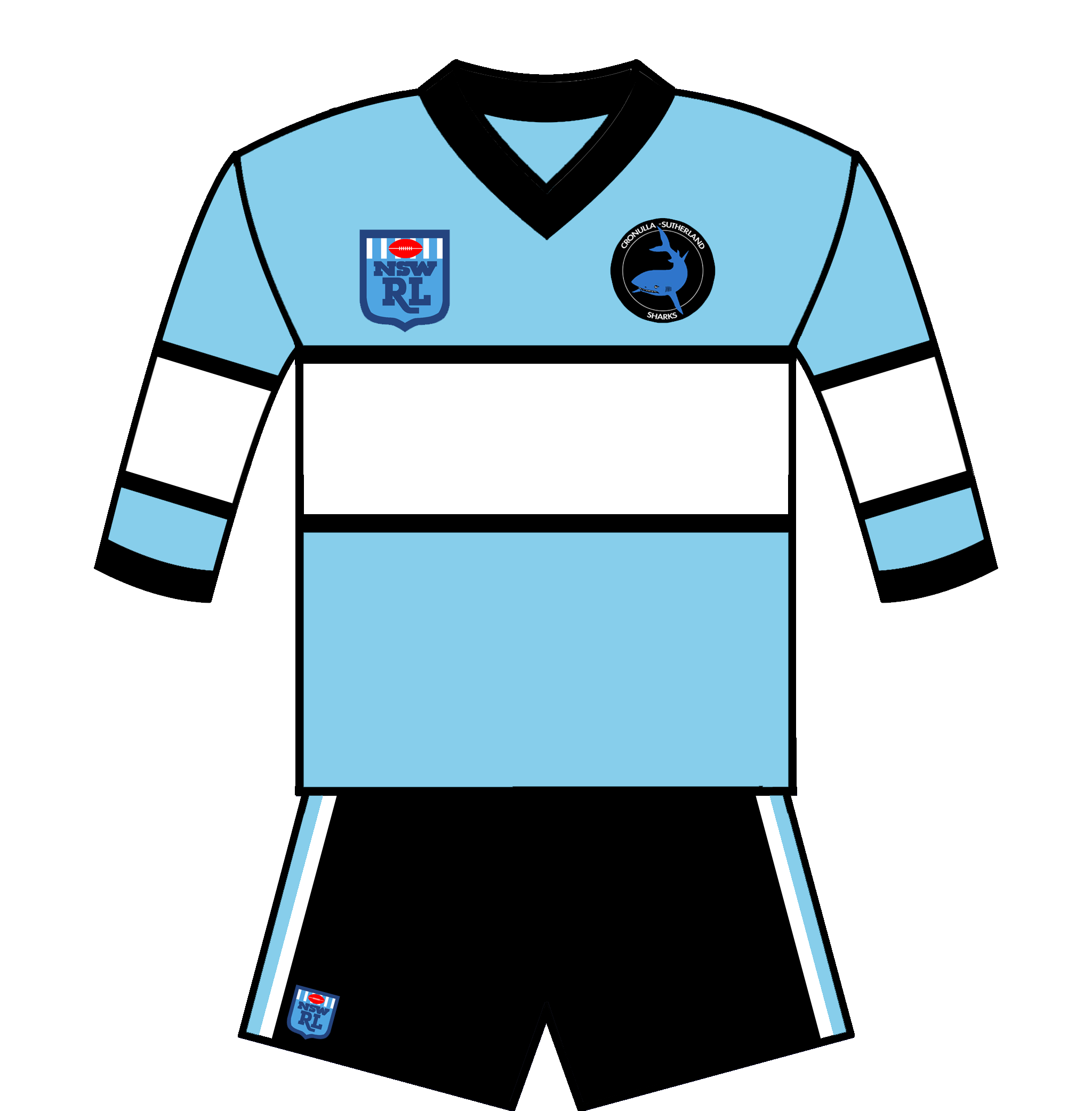
Cronulla 24th season Ground: Endeavour Field; Coach: Allan Fitzgibbon; Captain: David Hatch

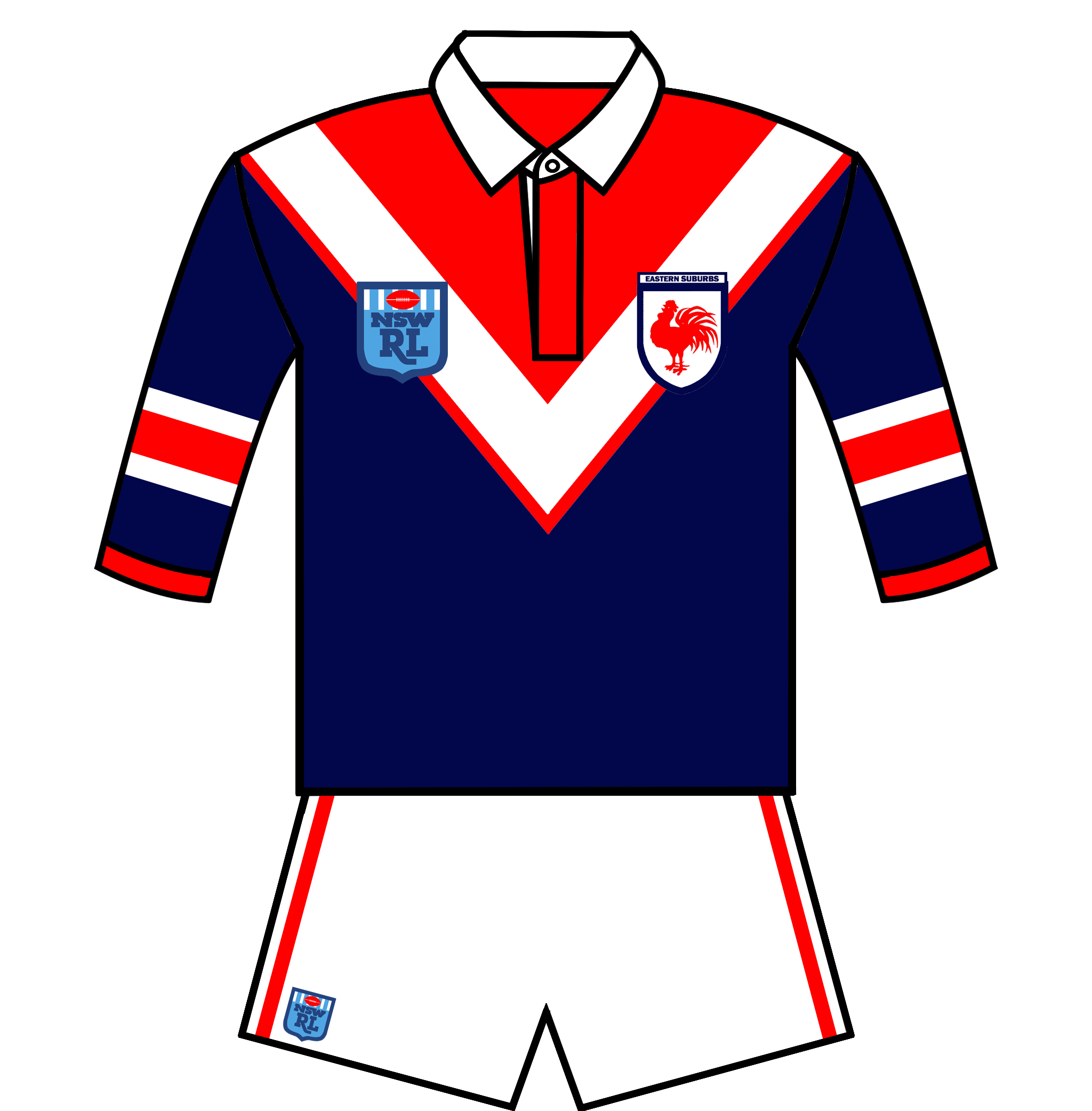
Eastern Suburbs 83rd season Ground: Sydney Football Stadium; Coach: Russell Fairfax→Hugh McGahan; Captain: Hugh McGahan

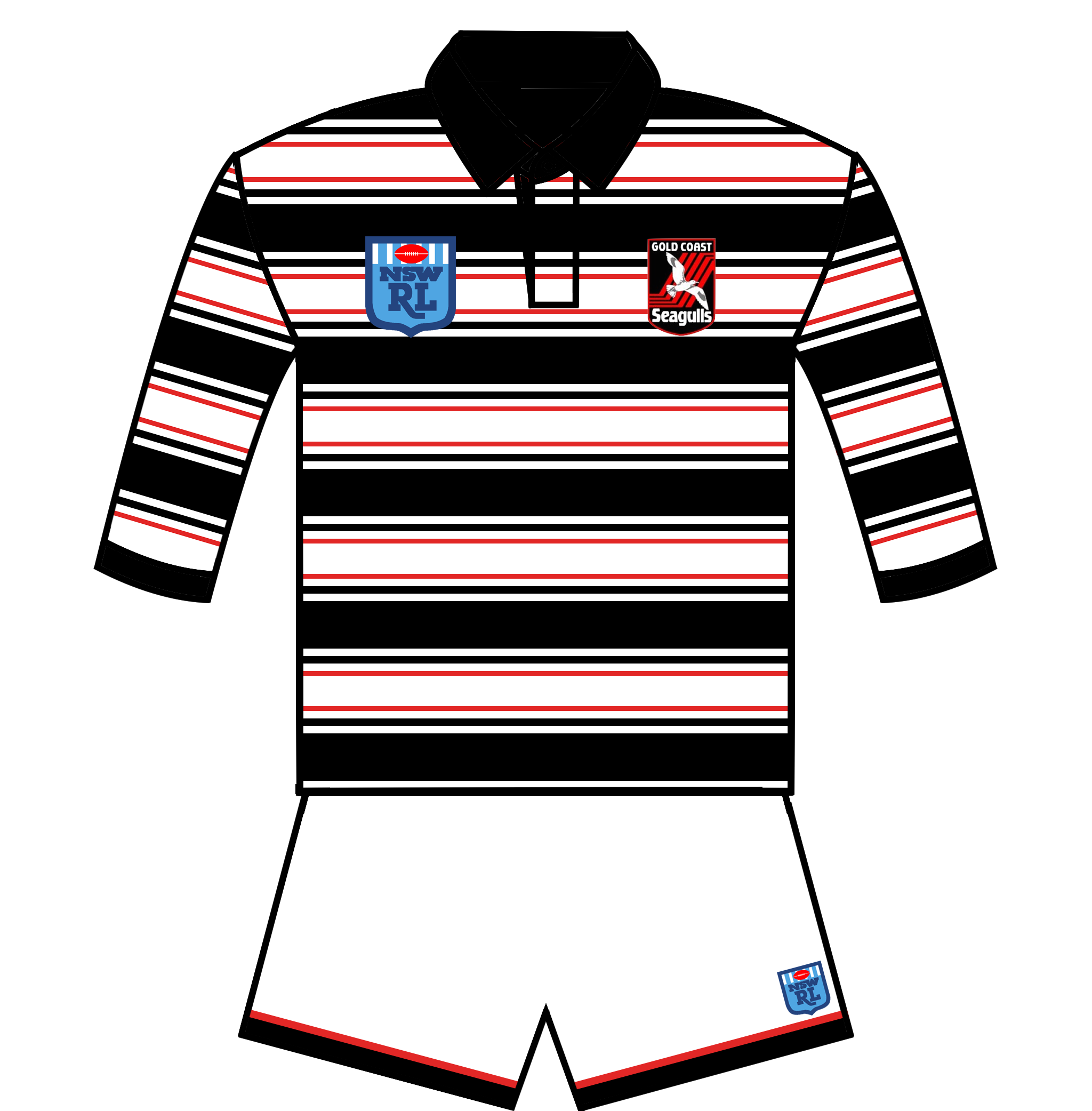
Gold Coast 3rd season Ground: Seagulls Stadium; Coach: Bob McCarthy; Captain: Billy Johnstone

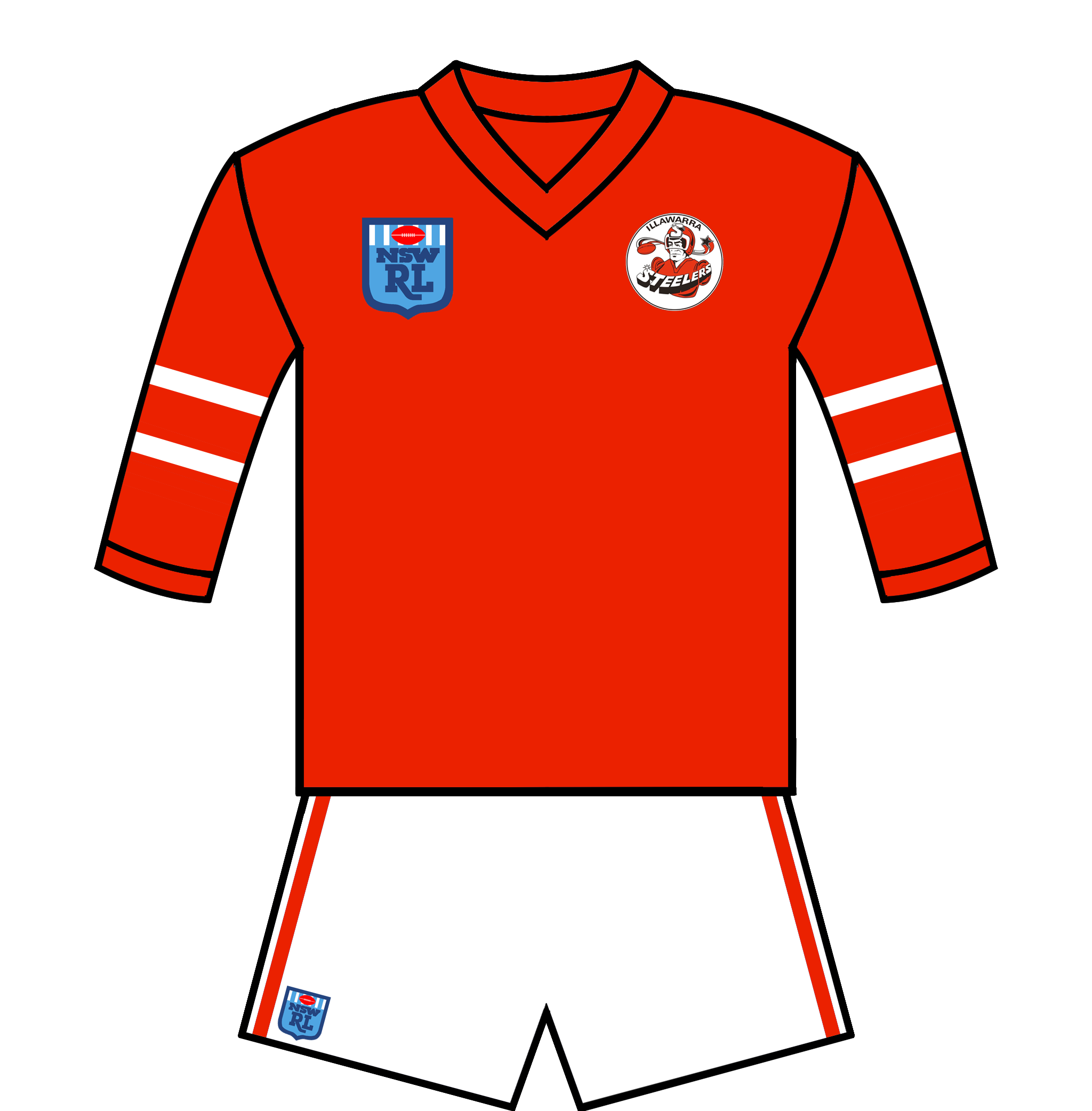
Illawarra 9th season Ground: Wollongong Showground; Coach: Ron Hilditch; Captain: Chris Walsh

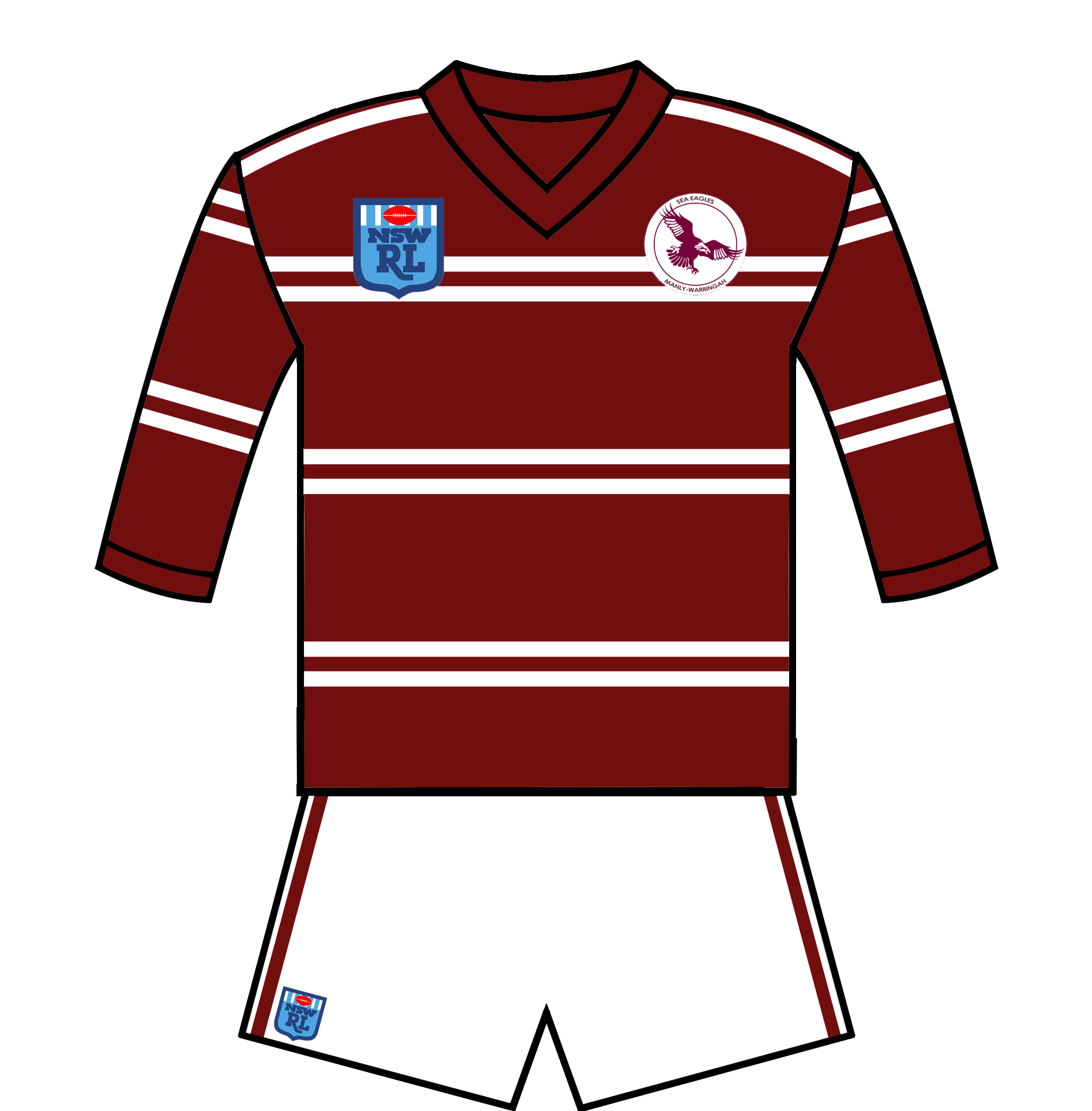
Manly 44th season Ground: Brookvale Oval; Coach: Graham Lowe; Captain: Michael O'Connor

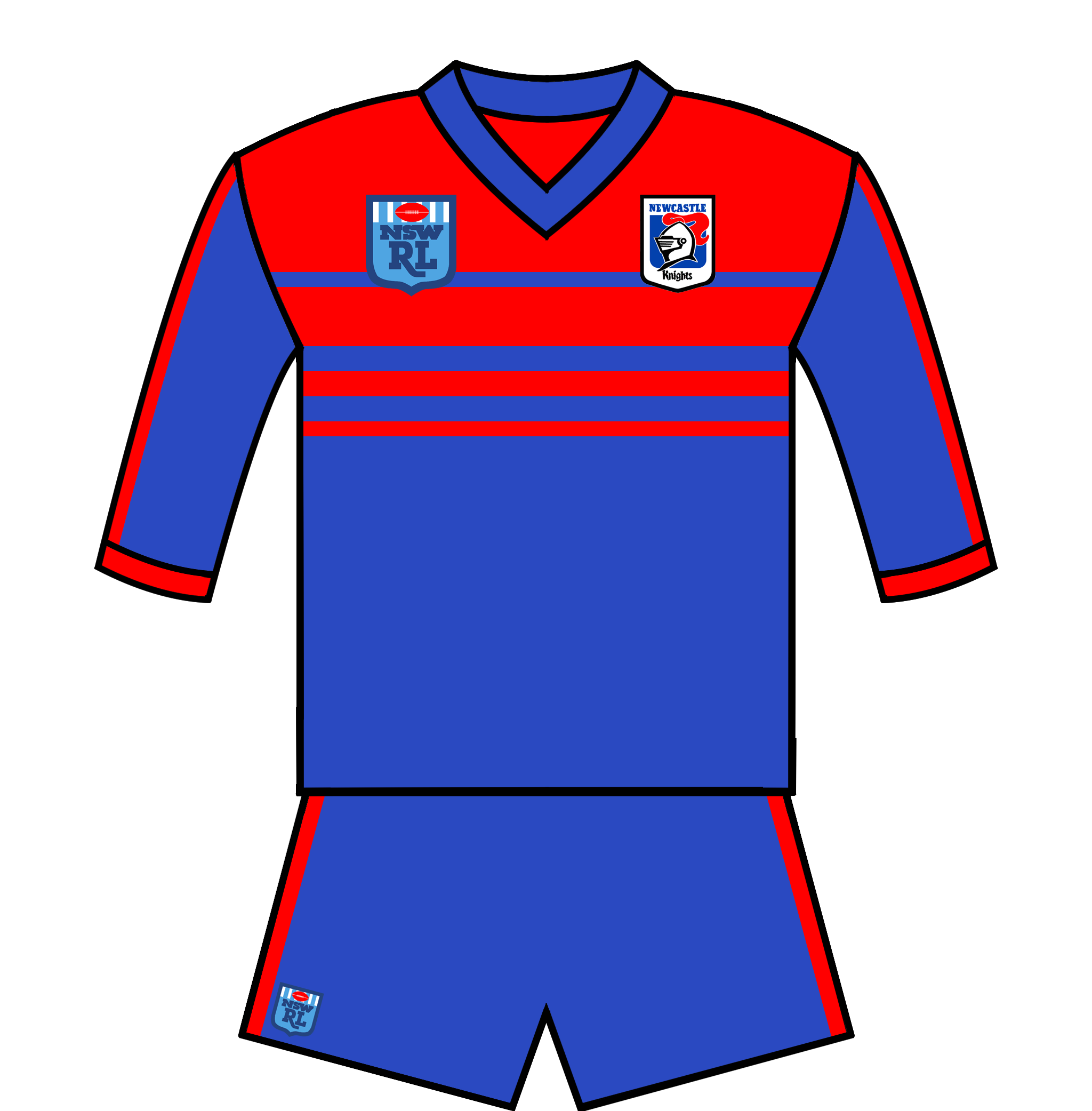
Newcastle 3rd season Ground: Marathon Stadium; Coach: Allan McMahon; Captain: Sam Stewart

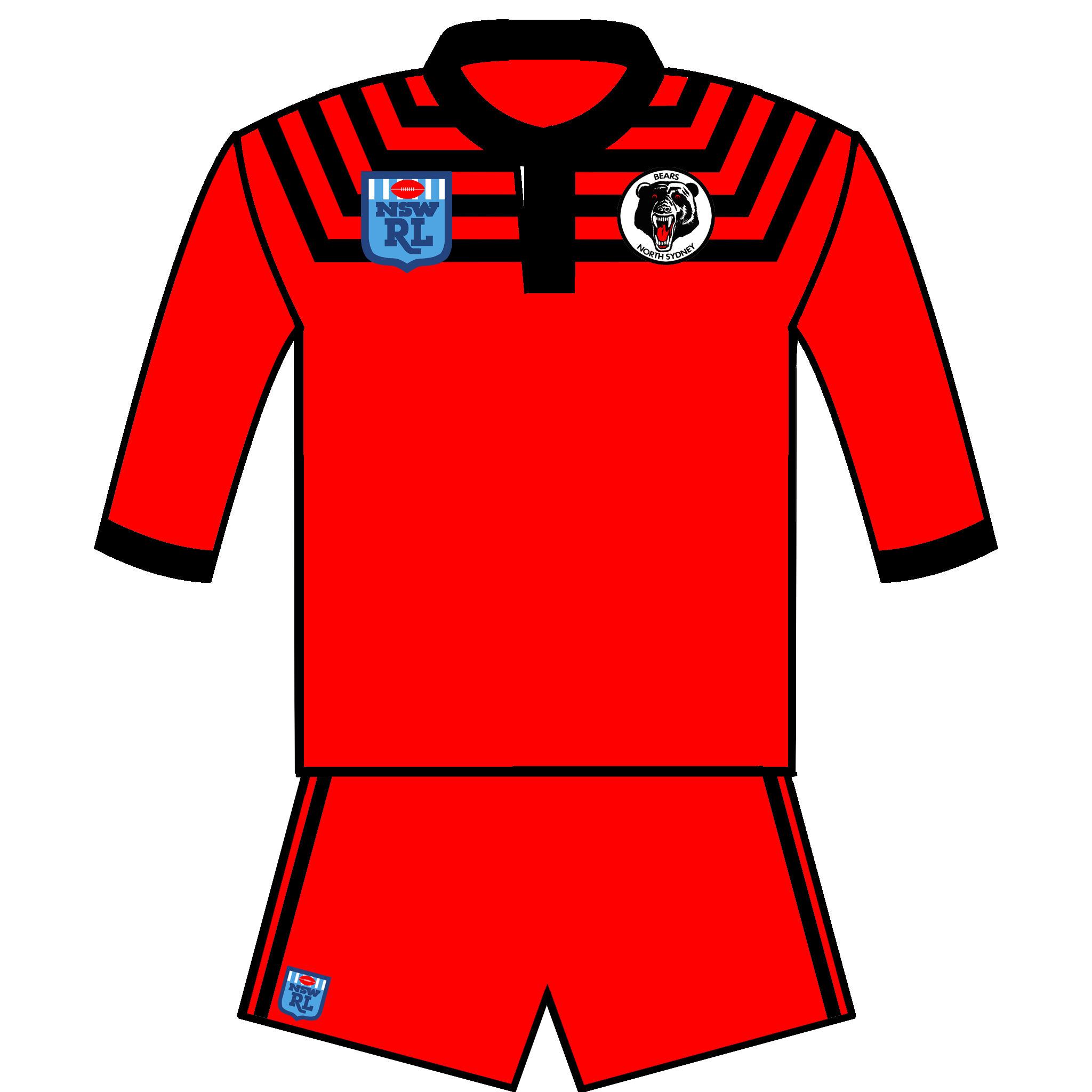
North Sydney 83rd season Ground: North Sydney Oval; Coach: Steve Martin; Captain: Tony Rea

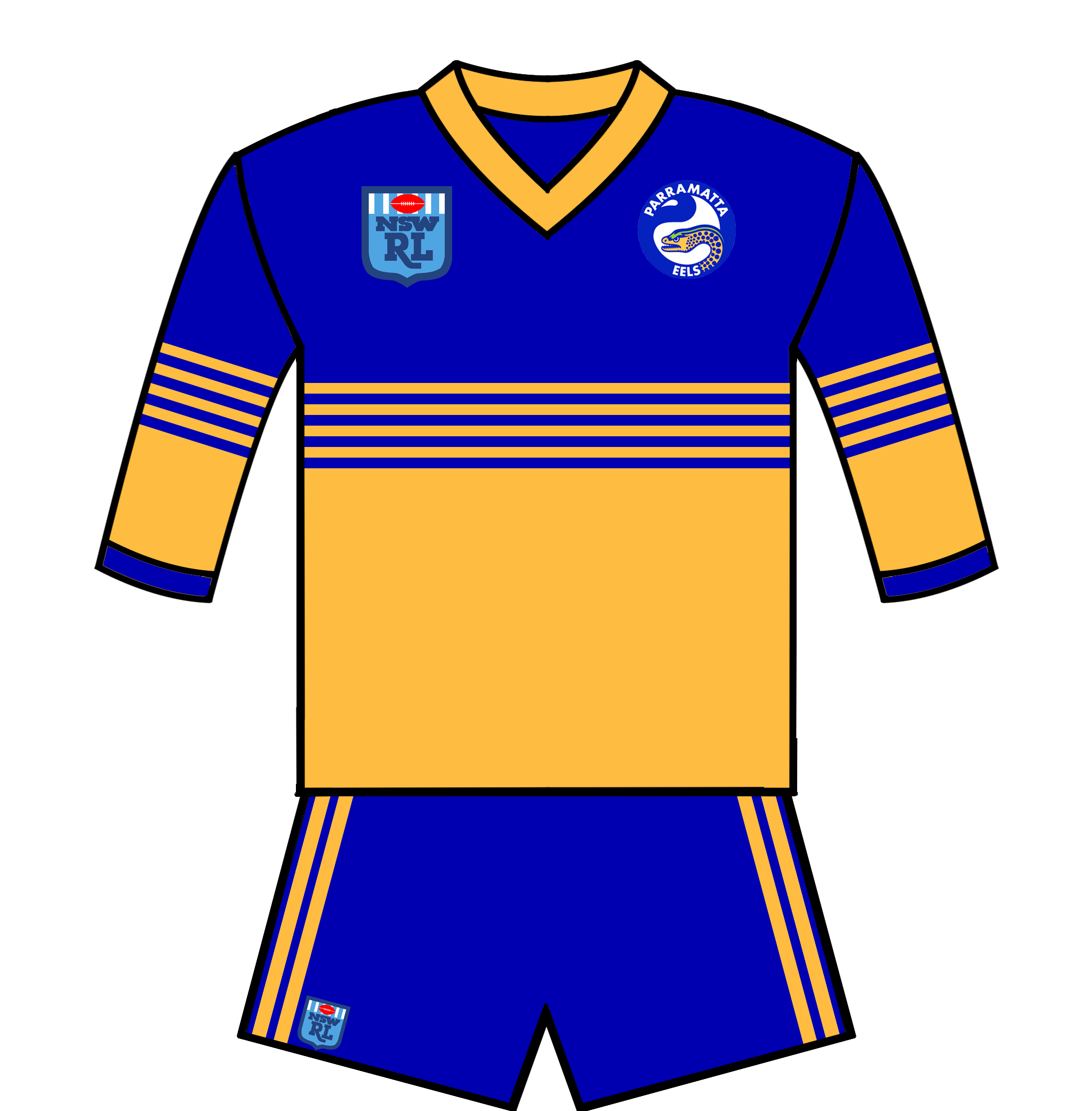
Parrmatta 44th season Ground: Parramatta Stadium; Coach: Mick Cronin; Captain: Peter Sterling

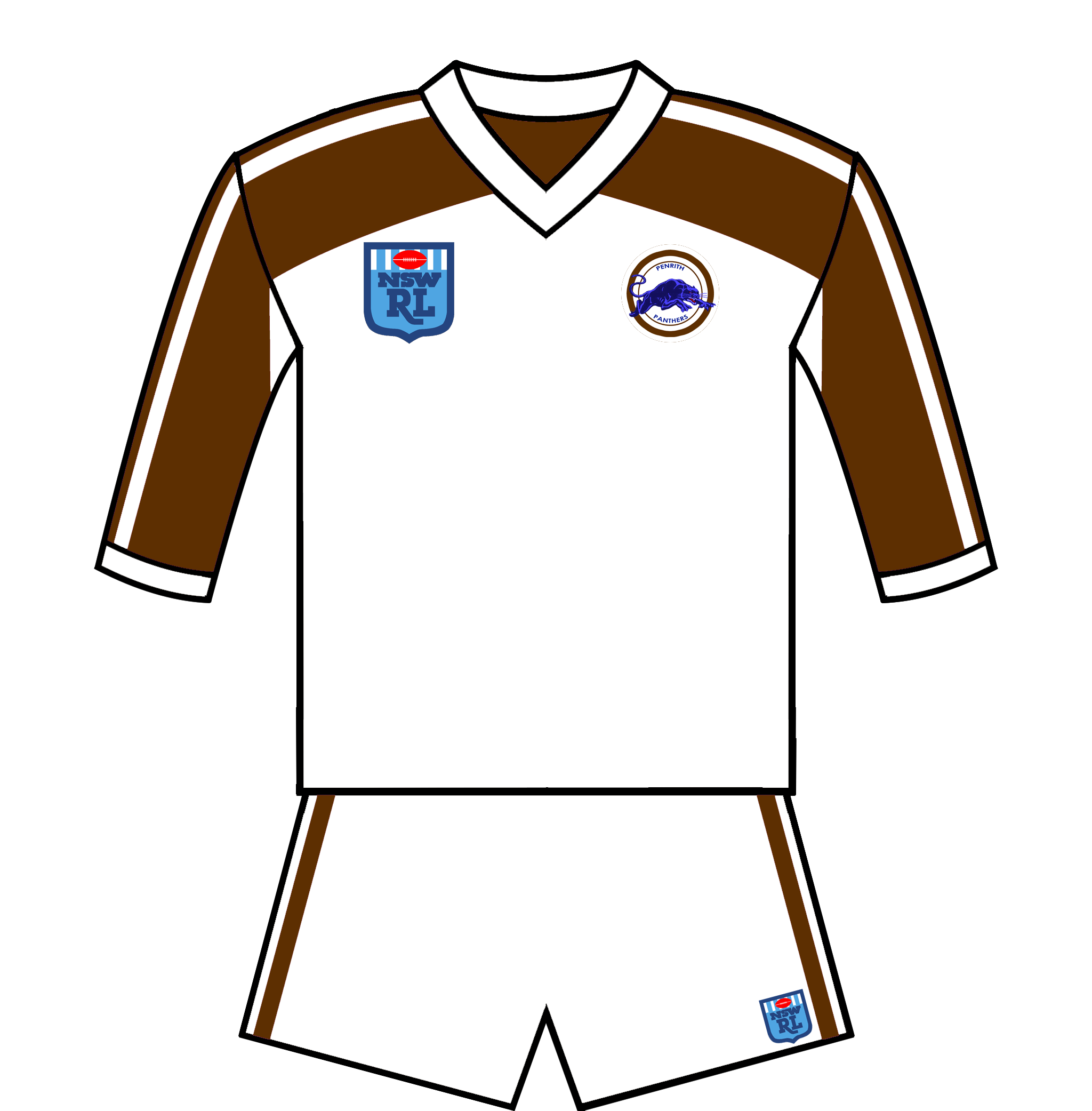
Penrith 24th season Ground: Penrith Stadium; Coach: Phil Gould; Captain: Royce Simmons

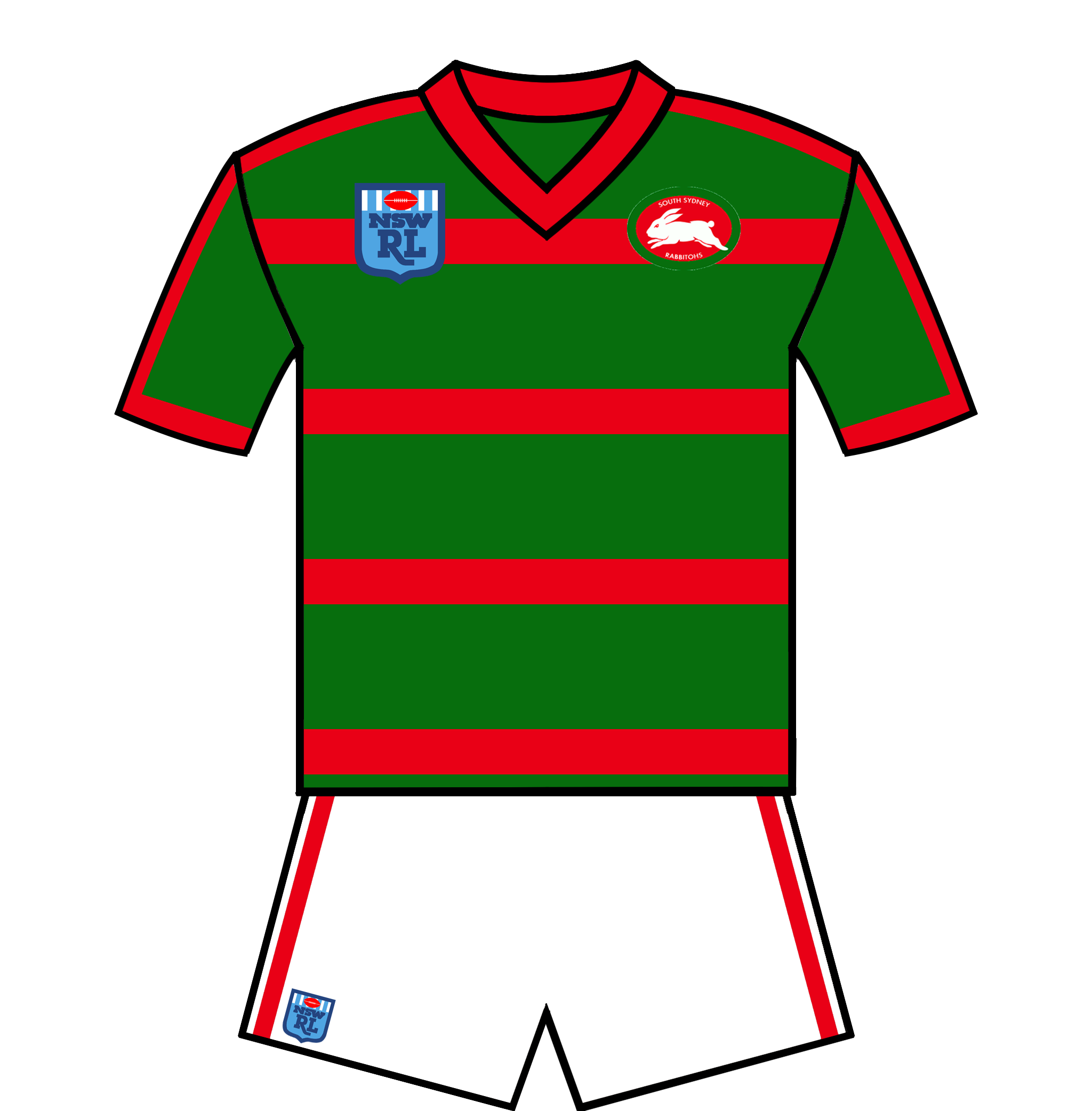
South Sydney 83rd season Ground: Sydney Football Stadium; Coach: George Piggins → Frank Curry; Captain: Mario Fenech

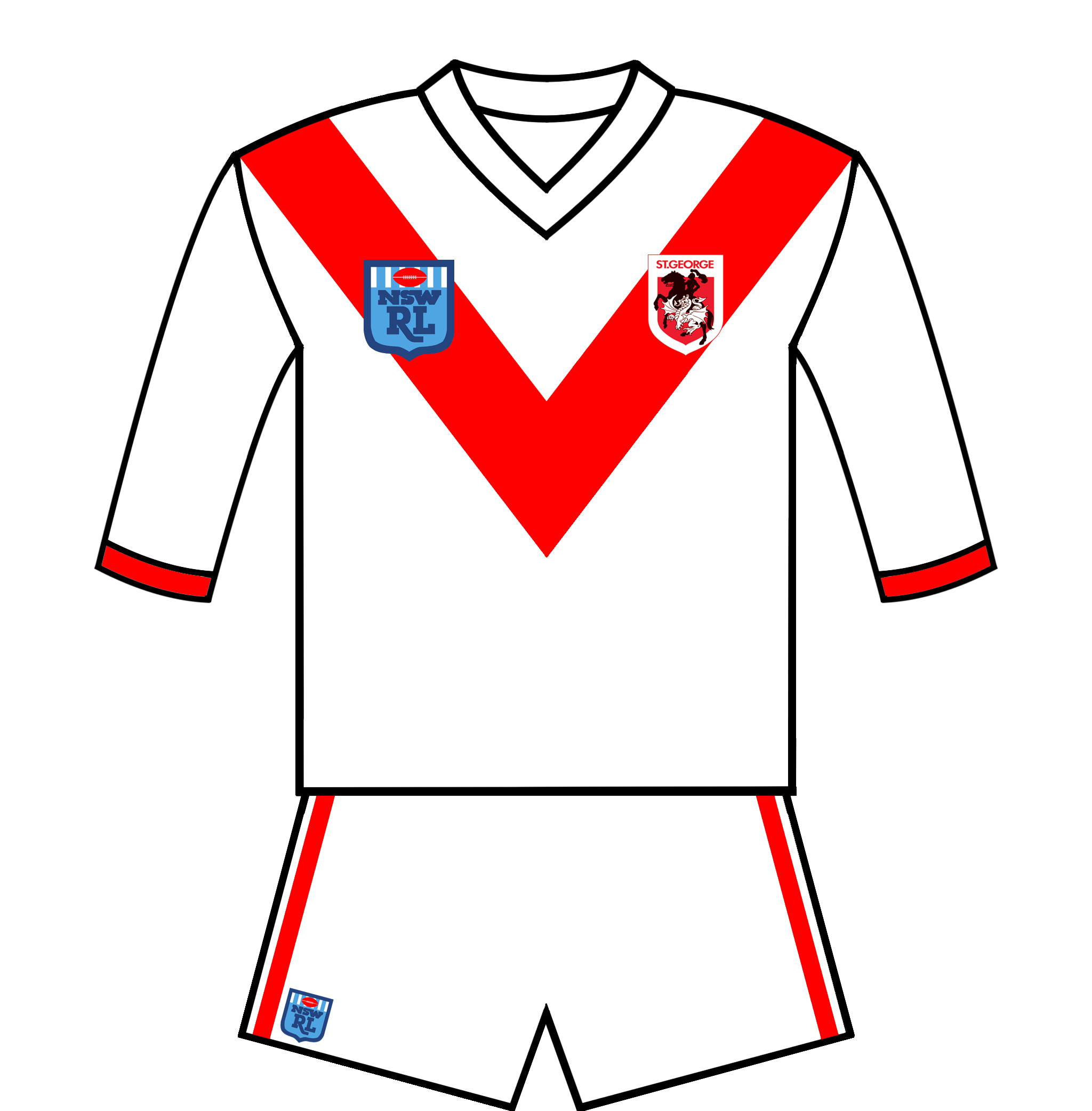
St. George 70th season Ground: Kogarah Oval; Coach: Craig Young; Captain: Trevor Bailey

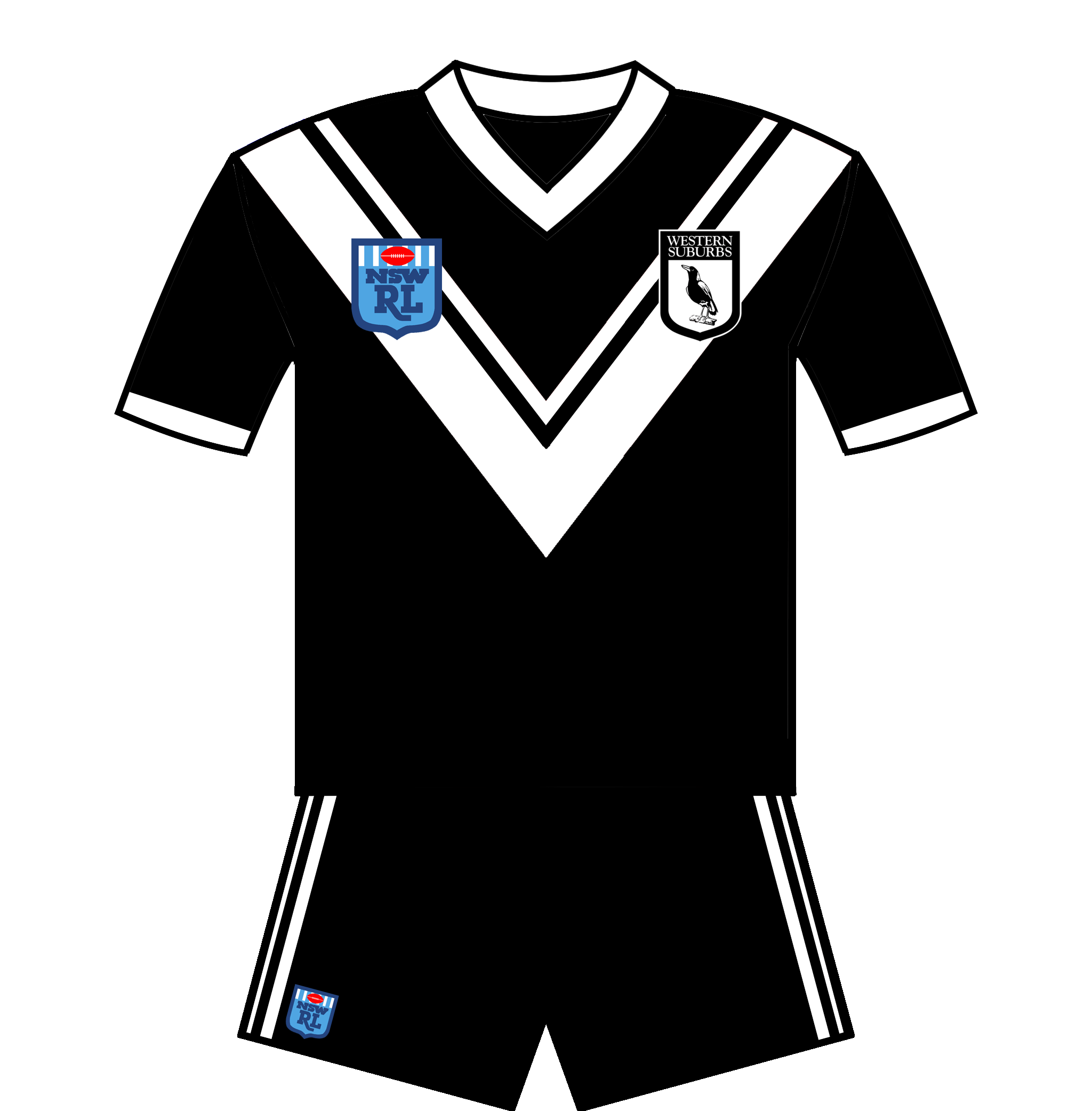
Western Suburbs 83rd season Ground: Orana Park; Coach: John Bailey; Captain: Ivan Henjak

=== Advertising ===
1990 saw the NSWRL's advertising shift to a new level of sophistication, marking the first use of Tina Turner's 1989 hit "The Best". The league and its Sydney advertising agency Hertz Walpole struck gold in forging a link between the game and the song, which would become the soundtrack to a marketing success story that skyrocketed right up to a point of self-implosion in the Super League war of 1996–1997.

Tina Turner's manager Roger Davies contacted agency chief Jim Walpole in 1989 to advise that Turner's upcoming album Foreign Affair was to contain a rendition of a Mike Chapman and Holly Knight song which might possibly be of interest to Walpole's NSWRL client. The track, which had been previously released by Bonnie Tyler with modest results, would prove to be one of Turner's most successful singles. After hearing demo tracks, Walpole and the NSWRL General Manager John Quayle and his marketing staff sensed the linkage could be perfect.

Turner was brought to Australia amid much public interest for a massive film shoot where enough footage was secured for advertisements for both the 1990 and 1991 seasons.

The finished 1990 advertisement, in its full two-minute version, tells the story of Turner's touchdown at Sydney Airport and a scurry through paparazzi; she then finds herself in a warehouse training scene that's more glamour than grit where players from a number of clubs are working out on weights and climbing vertical chains. She plays touch footy on a beach, attends a lunch where she cheekily surprises Gavin Miller, whom she had met at the 1989 UK shoot, and later arrives by helicopter to a black-tie dinner with Andrew Ettingshausen and Gene Miles. Throughout are the de rigueur big hits and action shots, with Turner cheering in a replica grand final crowd, and finally congratulating the 1989 premiership captain, Mal Meninga.

== Regular season ==
| Team | 1 | 2 | 3 | 4 | 5 | 6 | 7 | 8 | 9 | 10 | 11 | 12 | 13 | 14 | 15 | 16 | 17 | 18 | 19 | 20 | 21 | 22 | F1 | F2 | F3 | F4 | GF |
|---|---|---|---|---|---|---|---|---|---|---|---|---|---|---|---|---|---|---|---|---|---|---|---|---|---|---|---|
| Balmain | **MAN** **−2** | PEN −14 | **BRI** **+2** | NOR +12 | **WES** **+8** | PAR +17 | **NEW** **+20** | CAN −14 | **STG** **+2** | **CBY** **+20** | CRO −8 | **EAS** **+20** | GCS +44 | **SOU** **+34** | ILA +24 | MAN −14 | **PEN** **+5** | BRI −14 | **NOR** **+8** | WES +4 | **PAR** **−4** | NEW −2 | **NEW** **+8** | MAN −16 | | | |
| Brisbane | WES; 0 | **PAR** **+20** | BAL −2 | **MAN** **+2** | **PEN** **−8** | NEW +24 | **NOR** **−2** | EAS +24 | **CRO** **+12** | **GCS** **+16** | SOU +28 | **ILA** **+30** | STG +4 | **CAN** **+2** | CBY +18 | **WES** **+20** | PAR +2 | **BAL** **+14** | MAN −14 | PEN −16 | **NEW** **+20** | NOR +6 | X | PEN −10 | MAN +8 | CAN −28 | |
| Canberra | **STG** **+16** | ILA +14 | **CBY** **−4** | CRO −1 | **EAS** **+62** | GCS +8 | **SOU** **+34** | **BAL** **+14** | MAN +17 | **NEW** **+6** | PAR −9 | **WES** **+4** | NOR +23 | BRI −2 | **PEN** **−21** | STG +16 | **ILA**; **0** | CBY +8 | **CRO** **+14** | EAS +16 | **GCS** **+24** | SOU +48 | X | X | PEN −18 | **BRI** **+28** | PEN +4 |
| Canterbury | SOU +4 | **STG** **−2** | CAN +4 | ILA +18 | **CRO** **+8** | EAS; 0 | **GCS** **+22** | **MAN** **+10** | PEN +22 | BAL −20 | NEW −2 | **PAR** **−20** | WES −8 | **NOR** **−6** | **BRI** **−18** | **SOU** **+16** | STG −1 | **CAN** **−8** | **ILA** **+4** | CRO +26 | **EAS** **+8** | GCS +6 | | | | | |
| Cronulla | GCS +30 | **SOU** **+26** | **STG** **+13** | **CAN** **+1** | CBY −8 | **ILA** **−12** | **EAS** **+28** | **PEN** **+16** | BRI −12 | MAN −16 | **BAL** **+8** | **NEW** **−2** | PAR +6 | **WES** **+6** | NOR −16 | **GCS** **+28** | SOU +16 | STG −22 | CAN −14 | **CBY** **−26** | ILA −34 | EAS −5 | | | | | |
| Easts | ILA −1 | **GCS** **+14** | **SOU** **−14** | **STG** **+4** | CAN −62 | **CBY**; **0** | CRO −28 | **BRI** **−24** | **NOR** **−30** | PEN −2 | **MAN** **−34** | BAL −20 | NEW −18 | **PAR** **−30** | WES +12 | **ILA** **−16** | GCS −16 | **SOU** **+8** | STG +12 | **CAN** **−16** | CBY −8 | **CRO** **+5** | | | | | |
| Gold Coast | **CRO** **−30** | EAS −14 | **ILA** **−35** | **SOU** **+13** | STG −20 | **CAN** **−8** | CBY −22 | NOR −23 | **WES** **−15** | BRI −16 | **PEN** **−22** | MAN −34 | **BAL** **−44** | **NEW** **−8** | PAR −40 | CRO −28 | **EAS** **+16** | ILA −8 | SOU +26 | **STG** **+8** | CAN −24 | **CBY** **−6** | | | | | |
| Illawarra | **EAS** **+1** | **CAN** **−14** | GCS +35 | **CBY** **−18** | **SOU** **+2** | CRO +12 | **STG** **−7** | PAR −4 | **NEW** **−6** | **WES** **+12** | NOR −8 | BRI −30 | **PEN** **+8** | MAN −18 | **BAL** **−24** | EAS +16 | CAN; 0 | **GCS** **+8** | CBY −4 | SOU +6 | **CRO** **+34** | STG +4 | | | | | |
| Manly | BAL +2 | **NEW** **+16** | PEN −14 | BRI −2 | **NOR** **−8** | WES +14 | **PAR** **+14** | CBY −10 | **CAN** **−17** | **CRO** **+16** | EAS +34 | **GCS** **+34** | SOU +6 | **ILA** **+18** | STG +4 | **BAL** **+14** | NEW −6 | **PEN** **−18** | **BRI** **+14** | NOR +7 | **WES** **+6** | PAR +16 | X | **BAL** **+16** | **BRI** **−8** | | |
| Newcastle | **NOR** **+5** | MAN −16 | **WES** **+34** | PEN; 0 | **PAR** **−23** | **BRI** **−24** | BAL −20 | **STG** **+22** | ILA +6 | CAN −6 | **CBY** **+2** | CRO +2 | **EAS** **+18** | GCS +8 | **SOU** **+5** | NOR +20 | **MAN** **+6** | WES +32 | **PEN** **−14** | PAR; 0 | BRI −20 | **BAL** **+2** | BAL −8 | | | | |
| Norths | NEW −5 | **WES** **+2** | PAR −1 | **BAL** **−12** | MAN +8 | **PEN** **−4** | BRI +2 | **GCS** **+23** | EAS +30 | SOU +17 | **ILA** **+8** | STG −6 | **CAN** **−23** | CBY +6 | **CRO** **+16** | **NEW** **−20** | WES +10 | **PAR** **−2** | BAL −8 | **MAN** **−7** | PEN −4 | **BRI** **−6** | | | | | |
| Parramatta | **PEN** **+9** | BRI −20 | **NOR** **+1** | WES −16 | NEW +23 | **BAL** **−17** | MAN −14 | **ILA** **+4** | SOU −16 | STG +10 | **CAN** **+9** | CBY +20 | **CRO** **−6** | EAS +30 | **GCS** **+40** | PEN −12 | **BRI** **−2** | NOR +2 | **WES** **+7** | **NEW**; **0** | BAL +4 | **MAN** **−16** | | | | | |
| Penrith | PAR −9 | **BAL** **+14** | **MAN** **+14** | **NEW**; **0** | BRI +8 | NOR +4 | **WES** **+2** | CRO −16 | **CBY** **−22** | **EAS** **+2** | GCS +22 | **SOU** **+38** | ILA −8 | **STG** **+10** | CAN +21 | **PAR** **+12** | BAL −5 | MAN +18 | NEW +14 | **BRI** **+16** | **NOR** **+4** | WES −10 | X | **BRI** **+10** | **CAN** **+18** | X | **CAN** **−4** |
| Souths | **CBY** **−4** | CRO −26 | EAS +14 | GCS −13 | ILA −2 | **STG** **−23** | CAN −34 | WES −8 | **PAR** **+16** | **NOR** **−17** | **BRI** **−28** | PEN −38 | **MAN** **−6** | BAL −34 | NEW −5 | CBY −16 | **CRO** **−16** | EAS −8 | **GCS** **−26** | **ILA** **−6** | STG −22 | **CAN** **−48** | | | | | |
| St. George | CAN −16 | CBY +2 | CRO −13 | EAS −4 | **GCS** **+20** | SOU +23 | ILA +7 | NEW −22 | BAL −2 | **PAR** **−10** | WES −6 | **NOR** **+6** | **BRI** **−4** | PEN −10 | **MAN** **−4** | **CAN** **−16** | **CBY** **+1** | **CRO** **+22** | **EAS** **−12** | GCS −8 | **SOU** **+22** | **ILA** **−4** | | | | | |
| Wests | **BRI**; **0** | NOR −2 | NEW −34 | **PAR** **+16** | BAL −8 | **MAN** **−14** | PEN −2 | **SOU** **+8** | GCS +15 | ILA −12 | **STG** **+6** | CAN −4 | **CBY** **+8** | CRO −6 | **EAS** **−12** | BRI −20 | **NOR** **−10** | **NEW** **−32** | PAR −7 | **BAL** **−4** | MAN −6 | **PEN** **+10** | | | | | |
| Team | 1 | 2 | 3 | 4 | 5 | 6 | 7 | 8 | 9 | 10 | 11 | 12 | 13 | 14 | 15 | 16 | 17 | 18 | 19 | 20 | 21 | 22 | F1 | F2 | F3 | F4 | GF |

Bold – Home game
X – Bye
Opponent for round listed above margin

=== Ladder ===
South Sydney went from minor premiers in 1989 to wooden spooners in 1990, becoming the third club to suffer this ignominy after Canterbury from 1942 to 1943 and Western Suburbs from 1952 to 1953 – however, the Rabbitohs’ decline of sixteen and a half wins is easily the most severe in league history. It would mark the beginning of a 22-year barren wilderness for the Rabbitohs spanning 1990-2011 (which included two seasons excluded from the competition in 2000–01), during which they would only record a solitary finals appearance in 2007. Canberra won their first minor premiership, which they wouldn't win again until 2025.

| | Team | Pld | W | D | L | PF | PA | PD | Pts |
|---|---|---|---|---|---|---|---|---|---|
| 1 | **Canberra (P)** | 22 | 16 | 1 | 5 | 532 | 245 | +287 | 33 |
| 2 | Brisbane | 22 | 16 | 1 | 5 | 478 | 278 | +200 | 33 |
| 3 | Penrith | 22 | 15 | 1 | 6 | 415 | 286 | +129 | 31 |
| 4 | Manly | 22 | 15 | 0 | 7 | 395 | 255 | +140 | 30 |
| 5 | Balmain | 22 | 14 | 0 | 8 | 432 | 284 | +148 | 28 |
| 6 | Newcastle | 22 | 13 | 2 | 7 | 344 | 305 | +39 | 28 |
| 7 | Canterbury | 22 | 12 | 1 | 9 | 354 | 291 | +63 | 25 |
| 8 | Parramatta | 22 | 12 | 1 | 9 | 387 | 347 | +40 | 25 |
| 9 | Illawarra | 22 | 11 | 1 | 10 | 366 | 361 | +5 | 23 |
| 10 | Cronulla | 22 | 11 | 0 | 11 | 370 | 359 | +11 | 22 |
| 11 | North Sydney | 22 | 10 | 0 | 12 | 322 | 298 | +24 | 20 |
| 12 | St. George | 22 | 8 | 0 | 14 | 371 | 399 | -28 | 16 |
| 13 | Western Suburbs | 22 | 6 | 1 | 15 | 323 | 433 | -110 | 13 |
| 14 | Eastern Suburbs | 22 | 6 | 1 | 15 | 283 | 547 | -264 | 13 |
| 15 | Gold Coast | 22 | 4 | 0 | 18 | 233 | 567 | -334 | 8 |
| 16 | South Sydney | 22 | 2 | 0 | 20 | 302 | 652 | -350 | 4 |

=== Ladder progression ===
- Numbers highlighted in green indicate that the team finished the round inside the top 5.
- Numbers highlighted in blue indicates the team finished first on the ladder in that round.
- Numbers highlighted in red indicates the team finished last place on the ladder in that round.

| | Team | 1 | 2 | 3 | 4 | 5 | 6 | 7 | 8 | 9 | 10 | 11 | 12 | 13 | 14 | 15 | 16 | 17 | 18 | 19 | 20 | 21 | 22 |
|---|---|---|---|---|---|---|---|---|---|---|---|---|---|---|---|---|---|---|---|---|---|---|---|
| 1 | Canberra | 2 | 4 | 4 | 4 | 6 | 8 | 10 | 12 | 14 | 16 | 16 | 18 | 20 | 20 | 20 | 22 | 23 | 25 | 27 | 29 | 31 | 33 |
| 2 | Brisbane | 1 | 3 | 3 | 5 | 5 | 7 | 7 | 9 | 11 | 13 | 15 | 17 | 19 | 21 | 23 | 25 | 27 | 29 | 29 | 29 | 31 | 33 |
| 3 | Penrith | 0 | 2 | 4 | 5 | 7 | 9 | 11 | 11 | 11 | 13 | 15 | 17 | 17 | 19 | 21 | 23 | 23 | 25 | 27 | 29 | 31 | 31 |
| 4 | Manly | 2 | 4 | 4 | 4 | 4 | 6 | 8 | 8 | 8 | 10 | 12 | 14 | 16 | 18 | 20 | 22 | 22 | 22 | 24 | 26 | 28 | 30 |
| 5 | Balmain | 0 | 0 | 2 | 4 | 6 | 8 | 10 | 10 | 12 | 14 | 14 | 16 | 18 | 20 | 22 | 22 | 24 | 24 | 26 | 28 | 28 | 28 |
| 6 | Newcastle | 2 | 2 | 4 | 5 | 5 | 5 | 5 | 7 | 9 | 9 | 11 | 13 | 15 | 17 | 19 | 21 | 23 | 25 | 25 | 26 | 26 | 28 |
| 7 | Canterbury Bulldogs | 2 | 2 | 4 | 6 | 8 | 9 | 11 | 13 | 15 | 15 | 15 | 15 | 15 | 15 | 15 | 17 | 17 | 17 | 19 | 21 | 23 | 25 |
| 8 | Parramatta Eels | 2 | 2 | 4 | 4 | 6 | 6 | 6 | 8 | 8 | 10 | 12 | 14 | 14 | 16 | 18 | 18 | 18 | 20 | 22 | 23 | 25 | 25 |
| 9 | Illawarra | 2 | 2 | 4 | 4 | 6 | 8 | 8 | 8 | 8 | 10 | 10 | 10 | 12 | 12 | 12 | 14 | 15 | 17 | 17 | 19 | 21 | 23 |
| 10 | Cronulla | 2 | 4 | 6 | 8 | 8 | 8 | 10 | 12 | 12 | 12 | 14 | 14 | 16 | 18 | 18 | 20 | 22 | 22 | 22 | 22 | 22 | 22 |
| 11 | North Sydney | 0 | 2 | 2 | 2 | 4 | 4 | 6 | 8 | 10 | 12 | 14 | 14 | 14 | 16 | 18 | 18 | 20 | 20 | 20 | 20 | 20 | 20 |
| 12 | St. George | 0 | 2 | 2 | 2 | 4 | 6 | 8 | 8 | 8 | 8 | 8 | 10 | 10 | 10 | 10 | 10 | 12 | 14 | 14 | 14 | 16 | 16 |
| 13 | Western Suburbs | 1 | 1 | 1 | 3 | 3 | 3 | 3 | 5 | 7 | 7 | 9 | 9 | 11 | 11 | 11 | 11 | 11 | 11 | 11 | 11 | 11 | 13 |
| 14 | Eastern Suburbs | 0 | 2 | 2 | 4 | 4 | 5 | 5 | 5 | 5 | 5 | 5 | 5 | 5 | 5 | 7 | 7 | 7 | 9 | 11 | 11 | 11 | 13 |
| 15 | Gold Coast | 0 | 0 | 0 | 2 | 2 | 2 | 2 | 2 | 2 | 2 | 2 | 2 | 2 | 2 | 2 | 2 | 4 | 4 | 6 | 8 | 8 | 8 |
| 16 | South Sydney | 0 | 0 | 2 | 2 | 2 | 2 | 2 | 2 | 4 | 4 | 4 | 4 | 4 | 4 | 4 | 4 | 4 | 4 | 4 | 4 | 4 | 4 |

== Finals ==
Balmain and Newcastle both finished on equal competition points in fifth position at the end of the regular season, so had to play off for the chance to advance through the finals.

| Home | Score | Away | Match Information |
| Home | Score | Away | Date and Time | Venue | Referee | Crowd |
|---|---|---|---|---|---|---|
Playoff
| Balmain Tigers | 12-4 | Newcastle Knights | 28 August 1990 | Parramatta Stadium | Bill Harrigan | 19,174 |
Qualifying Finals
| Manly Sea Eagles | 16-0 | Balmain Tigers | 1 September 1990 | Sydney Football Stadium | Bill Harrigan | 30,965 |
| Brisbane Broncos | 16-26 | Penrith Panthers | 2 September 1990 | Sydney Football Stadium | Eddie Ward | 24,409 |
Semi-finals
| Brisbane Broncos | 12-4 | Manly Sea Eagles | 8 September 1990 | Sydney Football Stadium | Bill Harrigan | 31,424 |
| Canberra Raiders | 12-30 | Penrith Panthers | 9 September 1990 | Sydney Football Stadium | Greg McCallum | 35,263 |
Preliminary final
| Canberra Raiders | 32-4 | Brisbane Broncos | 16 September 1990 | Sydney Football Stadium | Bill Harrigan | 31,628 |
Grand final
| Canberra Raiders | 18-14 | Penrith Panthers | 23 September 1990 | Sydney Football Stadium | Bill Harrigan | 41,535 |

=== Chart ===
Qualifying final
2 | Brisbane | 16
3 | Penrith | 26
4 | Manly | 16
5 | Balmain | 0

Major semi-final
1 | Canberra | 12
Penrith | 30
Minor semi-final
Brisbane | 12
Manly | 4

Preliminary final
Canberra | 32
Brisbane | 4

Grand final
Penrith | 14
Canberra | 18

=== Grand final ===
The 1990 season's grand final was played on the afternoon of Sunday, 23 September at the Sydney Football Stadium before a crowd of 41,535. Penrith were attempting to become the first team to win a grand final in their first attempt, but were coming up against an experienced Canberra team.

| Canberra Raiders | Position | Penrith Panthers |
|---|---|---|
| Gary Belcher | FB | David Greene |
| Paul Martin | WG | Alan McIndoe |
| Mal Meninga (c) | CE | Brad Fittler |
| Laurie Daley | CE | Col Bentley |
| John Ferguson | WG | Paul Smith |
| Chris O'Sullivan | FE | Brad Izzard |
| Ricky Stuart | HB | Greg Alexander |
| Brent Todd | PR | Paul Clarke |
| Steve Walters | HK | Royce Simmons (c) |
| Glenn Lazarus | PR | Barry Walker |
| Nigel Gaffey | SR | Mark Geyer |
| Gary Coyne | SR | John Cartwright |
| Dean Lance | LK | Chris Mortimer |
| Matthew Wood | Bench | Steve Carter |
| Phil Carey | Bench | Joe Vitanza |
| Craig Bellamy | Bench | |
| David Barnhill | Bench | |
| Tim Sheens | Coach | Phil Gould |

Extra time in the reserve grade grand final followed by the pre-match entertainment (including a performance by John Farnham) running late meant that referee Bill Harrigan blew time on for the kick-off half an hour behind schedule. This may have worked to the advantage of the more experienced Raiders and served to rattle the young Panthers. Canberra jumped to a 12-nil lead in the opening minutes after their half-back Ricky Stuart laid on tries for winger John Ferguson and Laurie Daley and the match appeared as good as over despite a strengthening of Penrith's defence as they recovered. The Panthers came back to trail 12-10 after Greg Alexander put Brad Fittler in for a try just before half-time and Paul Smith in for another seven minutes into the second half. Canberra moved to 18–10 in the second half when replacement winger Matthew Wood scored. A late try from Alexander still left Penrith trailing 18–14 at the full-time siren. Both sides finished with three tries each but the wizardry of Stuart and the kicking boot of Meninga were the difference that saw the Raiders with their second consecutive premiership.

Canberra's Ricky Stuart was awarded the Clive Churchill Medal as man of the match.

Canberra Raiders 18
Tries: Ferguson, Daley, Wood
Goals: Meninga 3/3

Penrith Panthers 14
Tries: Fittler, Smith, Alexander
Goals: Alexander 1/3

== Player statistics ==
The following statistics are as of the conclusion of Round 22.

Top 5 point scorers

| Points | Player | Tries | Goals | Field goals |
|---|---|---|---|---|
| 184 | Mal Meninga | 15 | 62 | 0 |
| 132 | Ricky Walford | 14 | 38 | 0 |
| 130 | Dale Shearer | 10 | 45 | 0 |
| 128 | Greg Alexander | 9 | 46 | 0 |
| 126 | Ashley Gordon | 15 | 33 | 0 |

Top 5 try scorers

| Tries | Player |
|---|---|
| 15 | Mal Meninga |
| 15 | Willie Carne |
| 15 | Ashley Gordon |
| 14 | Ricky Walford |
| 13 | Gary Belcher |
| 13 | Alan McIndoe |
| 13 | Ewan McGrady |
| 13 | Andrew Ettingshausen |

Top 5 goal scorers

| Goals | Player |
|---|---|
| 62 | Mal Meninga |
| 47 | Terry Lamb |
| 46 | Greg Alexander |
| 46 | Rod Wishart |
| 45 | Dale Shearer |
