= Scott Lewis =

Scott Lewis may refer to:

- Scott Lewis (left-handed pitcher) (born 1983), American baseball pitcher, 2008–2009
- Scott Lewis (right-handed pitcher) (born 1965), American baseball pitcher, 1990–1994
- Scott Lewis (politician) (born 1961), American politician
- Scott Lewis, vocalist for Carnifex
- Scott Lewis, CEO and Editor in Chief of Voice of San Diego
- Scott R. Lewis, American sound engineer
- Scott Lewis (rugby league) (born 1963), Australian rugby league player

== See also ==
- Lewis Scott (disambiguation)
- Lewis (surname)
