= Louis Scott =

Louis Scott may refer to:

- Louis Scott (soldier) (1887–1967), British-born Canadian officer
- Louis Scott (runner, born 1889) (1889–1954),
- Lou Scott (born 1945), American distance runner
- Louis Scott (actor) (born 1982), Thai-Scottish actor

== See also ==
- Lewis Scott (disambiguation)
- Scott (name)
