= Lachlan Lewis =

Australian rugby league footballer (born 1996)

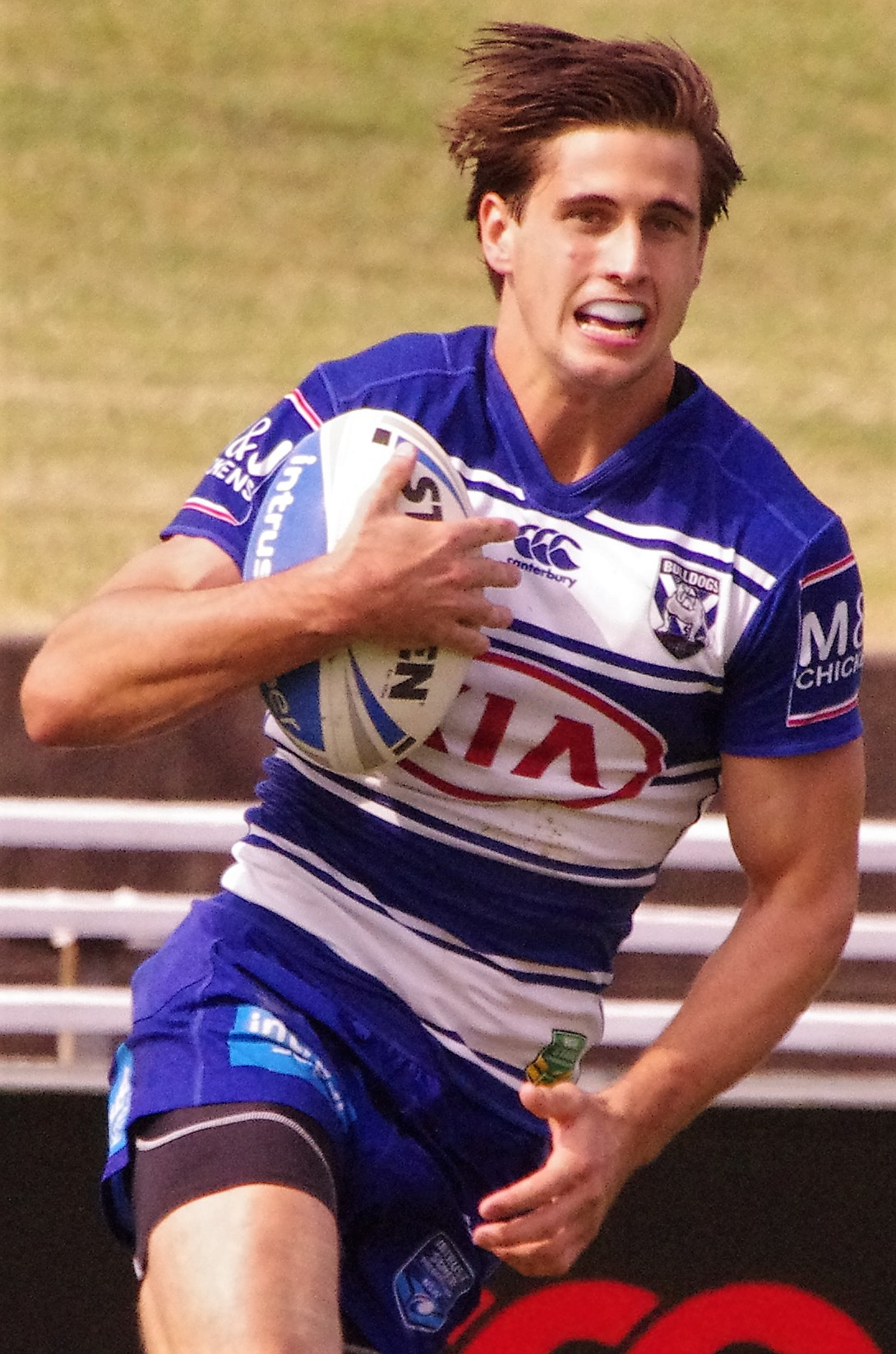

Personal information
- Full name: Lachlan James Lewis
- Born: 19 August 1996 (age 30) Brisbane, Queensland, Australia
- Height: 188 cm (6 ft 2 in)
- Weight: 90 kg (14 st 2 lb)

Playing information
- Position: Halfback, Five-eighth
Club
Years	Team	Pld	T	G	FG	P
2018–21	Canterbury Bulldogs	43	6	0	1	25
- Source: As of 14 May 2021
- Education: Iona College
- Father: Scott Lewis
- Relatives: Wally Lewis (uncle)

Lachlan Lewis (born 19 August 1996) is an Australian rugby league footballer who last played as a halfback or five-eighth for the Canterbury-Bankstown Bulldogs in the NRL.

== Background ==
Lewis was born in Brisbane, Queensland, Australia and is the son of former BRL footballer Scott Lewis and nephew of Queensland legend Wally Lewis.

Lewis played his junior football for the Capalaba Warriors and the Souths Logan Magpies and was educated at Iona College, playing alongside future Waratah-turned-Rebel Brad Wilkin before being signed by the Canberra Raiders. Lewis represented the Queensland under 16s and 18s team. Lewis played for the Raiders NYC team in 2014–2016. On 17 April 2016, Lewis signed a 2-year contract with the Canterbury-Bankstown Bulldogs effective immediately. Lewis played 10 matches for the Bulldogs NYC team in 2016. On 13 July 2016, Lewis represented the Queensland Under 20s team against the New South Wales Under-20s team, playing off the interchange bench in the 36–22 loss at Suncorp Stadium. Lewis played for the Bulldogs NSW Cup team in 2017. Outside of Rugby League, Lewis is also a Licensed Plumber.

== Playing career ==
=== 2018 ===
Lewis spent the first half of the season playing in Canterbury's NSW Cup team before the mid-season departure of Moses Mbye to the Wests Tigers and marquee half Kieran Foran was ruled out for the rest of the season after Round 12 due to being knee capped by Lewis. In Round 16 of the 2018 NRL season, Lewis made his NRL debut for the Canterbury Bulldogs against the Newcastle Knights, playing at five-eighth in the 36–16 win at Hunter Stadium. On 18 July 2018, Lewis extended his contract with the Bulldogs to the end of the 2020 season. In Round 23 against the New Zealand Warriors, on his 22nd birthday, Lewis had exceptional match, scoring a try and kicking a field goal with 2 minutes remaining to win the match for the Bulldogs 27–26 at ANZ Stadium. Lewis finished his debut year in the NRL playing in 9 matches, scoring 1 try and kicking 1 field goal for the Bulldogs in the 2018 NRL season.

=== 2019 ===
In the Good Friday Round 6 match against South Sydney, Lewis had a sledging battle with Souths captain Sam Burgess who said to Lewis that he would be “Found Out”. When Burgess would target the smaller Lewis, who is 26 kg lighter, Lewis put on big hits and forced an error from Burgess which got him frustrated and was deliberately slowing down the rucks during Canterbury's 14–6 loss at ANZ Stadium. Lewis commented that his battle with Burgess “It was probably like a fly hitting a car – it didn’t look like it affected him at all.”

Following Canterbury's round 8 loss to Manly, Lewis was demoted to reserve grade by coach Dean Pay and was replaced by Jack Cogger. At the time of his demotion, Canterbury had only won 2 of their first 6 games.

Lewis made a total of 15 appearances for Canterbury-Bankstown in the 2019 NRL season as the club finished 12th on the table. At one stage of the season, Canterbury were in last position on the ladder before achieving four upset victories in a row over Penrith, the Wests Tigers, South Sydney and Parramatta who were all competing for a place in the finals series and were higher on the table.

=== 2020 ===
Lewis made 13 appearances for Canterbury in the 2020 NRL season. The club finished in 15th place on the table, only avoiding the Wooden Spoon by for and against.

=== 2021 ===
In round 17 of the 2021 NRL season, Lewis scored two tries for Canterbury in a 22–16 loss against the Sydney Roosters, which left the club bottom of the table, four points adrift of second last Brisbane.

The following week, Lewis was bizarrely sent to the sin bin after the half-time siren when he grabbed South Sydney player Cody Walker and threw him to the ground. Canterbury would go on to lose the match 32–24.

On 31 August, Lewis was one of twelve players who were told by Canterbury that they would not be offered a contract for the 2022 season and would be released at season's end.

== Controversy ==
On 27 August 2021, Lewis was stood down by Canterbury after allegedly trying to sell on eBay a soundbar provided by the NRL to teams in lockdown. The matter was referred onto the NRL Integrity Unit.
