= 1987 Winfield State League =

Queensland Rugby League season

The 1987 Winfield State League was the 6th season of the Queensland Rugby League's statewide competition in Queensland, Australia. The competition was run similarly to the NSWRL's Amco Cup, featuring a short format prior the larger Brisbane Premiership season. The Wynnum Manly Seagulls defeated the Redcliffe Dolphins in the final at Lang Park in Brisbane, winning their fourth straight title.

== Teams ==
A total of 14 teams competed in the 1986 season, 8 of which were BRL Premiership clubs. The remaining six were regional teams from across the state.

Colours	Team	Moniker
	Easts	Tigers
	Fortitude Valley/Tweed Heads	Seagulls-Diehards
	Norths	Devils
	Past/Brisbane Brothers	Leprechauns
	Redcliffe	Dolphins
	Souths	Magpies
	Wests	Panthers
	Wynnum-Manly	Seagulls
	Ipswich	Jets
	North Queensland	Marlins
	Central Queensland	Capras
	Gold Coast	Vikings
	Toowoomba	Clydesdales
	Wide Bay	Bulls

== Ladder ==
	Team	Pld	W	D	L	PA	PD	Pts
1	Brothers	6	5	0	1	160	52	10
2	Toowoomba	6	5	0	1	154	76	10
3	Wynnum-Manly	6	5	0	1	146	85	10
4	Redcliffe	6	4	0	2	188	93	8
5	Valley-Tweed	6	4	0	2	151	101	8
6	Norths	6	4	0	2	106	104	8
7	Ipswich	6	3	0	3	126	79	6
8	Gold Coast	6	3	0	3	73	80	6
9	Souths	6	3	0	3	74	103	6
10	Central Queensland	6	2	0	4	70	164	4
11	Wide Bay	6	1	1	4	86	109	3
12	Easts	6	1	0	5	86	158	2
13	North Queensland	6	1	0	5	78	204	2
14	Wests	6	0	1	5	52	102	1

== Finals ==
Wynnum Manly, Redcliffe, Brisbane Brothers and Toowoomba were the semi-finalists.

Home	Score	Away	Match Information
Home	Score	Away	Date and Time	Venue	Referee	Crowd
Semi-finals
Wynnum Manly Seagulls	30 – 8	Toowoomba		Lang Park
Redcliffe Dolphins	16 – 6	Brisbane Brothers		Lang Park
Grand Final
Wynnum Manly Seagulls	36 – 14	Redcliffe Dolphins		Lang Park

== State League Final ==
1987 Winfield State League Final

17 May 1986

Wynnum-Manly Seagulls	36 – 14	Redcliffe Dolphins
Tries: 7 S Lewis 2 G Miles 2 P Sinclair 2 C Scott 1 Goals: 4 C Scott 4		Tries: 3; 1 J Doyle; 1 G Barwick; 1 D Brown; Goals: 1; 1 T Benson

Lang Park, Brisbane
Referee: Barry Gomersall
Player of the Match: Wally Lewis
