= Lewis Scott =

Lewis Scott may refer to:

== People ==
- Lewis Allaire Scott (1759–1798), American politician
- Lewis Everett Scott (1892–1960), American baseball shortstop
- Lewis Scott (racing driver) in 2011 24 Hours of Nürburgring
- Lewis Scot, pirate
- Lew Scott (born 1943), American football player

== Fiction ==
- Lewis Scott, a character in the film Waterland
- Lewis Scott, a character in the film Celtic Pride

== See also ==
- Louis Scott (disambiguation)
- Scott Lewis (disambiguation)
- Scott (name)
