= Darryl Van de Velde =

Australian rugby league player and coach (1951–2024)

Darryl van de Velde
Personal information
- Born: 3 October 1951
- Died: 27 February 2024 (aged 72)

Playing information
- Position: Second-row
Club
Years	Team	Pld	T	G	FG	P
1973–77	Southern Suburbs
1978	Redcliffe	23	6	0	0	18
	Total	23	6	0	0	18
Representative
Years	Team	Pld	T	G	FG	P
1977	Queensland	1	0	0	0	0

Coaching information
Club
Years	Team	Gms	W	D	L	W%
1986–87	Redcliffe	37	26	0	11	70
1988–93	Castleford	184	111	6	67	60
1995–96	Huddersfield
1997–01	Warrington Wolves	101	43	2	56	43
	Total	322	180	8	134	56

Darryl van de Velde (3 October 1951 – 27 February 2024) was an Australian professional rugby league footballer, coach and administrator. He played club football in Queensland for Souths and represented his state on one occasion in 1977.

Van de Velde was part of an unsuccessful syndicate to form the first New South Wales Rugby League premiership club in Queensland.

== Coaching career ==
After playing he coached the Brisbane Rugby League premiership's Redcliffe side in 1986 and 1987, taking his club to consecutive grand finals. He was then replaced by Graham Olling. He then embarked on a coaching career in England with Castleford in 1988, Darryl van de Velde was the coach in Castleford's 12–28 defeat by Wigan in the 1991–92 Challenge Cup Final during the 1991–92 season at Wembley Stadium, London on Saturday 2 May 1992, in front of a crowd of 77,386, before leaving in 1993. Van de Velde then became the chief executive officer of the new South Queensland Crushers club of the ARL premiership. He later coached Huddersfield and then joined Warrington Wolves in March 1997, spending five years at the club, but he failed to win a trophy before leaving in 2001.

== Sports administration ==
Van de Velde returned to Australia, and became a board member of the Queensland Rugby League in 2013.

== Death ==
Van de Velde died on 27 February 2024, at the age of 72.
