= Robert Grogan =

Australian rugby league footballer (born 1962)

Personal information
- Full name: Robert James Grogan
- Born: 21 March 1962 (age 64) Mount Isa, Queensland, Australia

Playing information
- Position: Five-eighth, Centre
Club
Years	Team	Pld	T	G	FG	P
1987–89	Halifax	60	10	0	0	40
1990	Gold Coast	17	4	0	0	16
1990–91	Rochdale Hornets	20	2	0	0	8
1991	Bradford Northern	6	0	0	0	0
	Total	103	16	0	0	64
Representative
Years	Team	Pld	T	G	FG	P
1987	Queensland	2	2	0	0	8

Robert James Grogan (born 21 March 1962) is an Australian former rugby league footballer.

An outside back, Grogan was a Norths Aspley junior and Queensland under–18s representative. He started his first grade career in 1980 with Brothers, playing under Wayne Bennett. In 1987, Grogan was part of Queensland's tour of New Zealand, scoring two tries against the Bay of Plenty, and featured in a premiership team for Brothers.

Grogan played for the Gold Coast in the 1990 NSWRL season, making 17 first–grade appearances. This included two tries against South Sydney in a man of the match–winning performance. He played more often in England, where he had stints with Halifax, Rochdale and Bradford during the late 1980s and early 1990s.
