= 1990 Penrith Panthers season =

- NSWRL rank: 3rd
- 1990 record: Wins: 15; draws: 1; losses: 6
- Points scored: For: 415; against: 286

Team information
- CEO: (Australia) Roger Cowan
- Coach: (Australia) Phil Gould
- Captain: (Australia) Royce Simmons
- Stadium: Penrith Football Stadium
- Avg. attendance: 10,025

Top scorers
- Tries: Alan McIndoe (14)
- Goals: Greg Alexander (59)
- Points: Greg Alexander (170)
← 1989	1991 →

The 1990 Penrith Panthers season was the 24th in the club's history. Coached by Phil Gould and captained by Royce Simmons, they competed in the New South Wales Rugby League's 1990 Winfield Cup Premiership, finishing 3rd (out of 16). The Panthers were beaten in the Grand Final by the Canberra Raiders.
