= Clinton Mohr =

Australian rugby league footballer

Personal information
- Full name: Clinton Mohr
- Born: 29 March 1966 (age 60) Brisbane, Queensland, Australia

Playing information
- Position: Fullback
Club
Years	Team	Pld	T	G	FG	P
19??–87	Brothers (Brisbane)	?	?	?	?	?
1988–89	St. George	39	14	0	0	56
1990–94	Gold Coast	80	19	0	0	76
	Total
- Source: Whiticker/Hudson

Clinton Mohr (born 29 March 1966) is an Australian former professional rugby league footballer who played in the 1980s and 1990s.

== Playing career ==
A fullback, he started his league career in the Brisbane Rugby League premiership at the Brothers club. At the end of the 1987 Brisbane Rugby League season he played at fullback, scoring a try for Brothers in their grand final win and was awarded the Rugby League Week Player of the Year. Mohr then joined the NSWRFL Premiership for the 1988 season, moving to Sydney and joining the St. George Dragons for two seasons. playing in the victorious Saints team that won the 1988 Panasonic Cup.

Mohr moved to the Gold Coast for the remainder of his career. Mohr made his debut for the Gold Coast in Round 1 1990 against Cronulla which ended in a 32–2 defeat. In 1991, the Gold Coast changed their nickname from the "Giants" to the "Seagulls" but finished last on the table claiming the wooden spoon. The Gold Coast then went on to finish last again in 1992 and 1993. Mohr retired at the end of the 1994 NSWRL season.
