= Trevor Benson =

Irish Anglican priest (1710–1782)

Trevor Benson (1710–1782) was an Anglican priest in Ireland.

Benson was born in County Down and educated at Trinity College, Dublin. He was Prebendary of Kilroot in Lisburn Cathedral from 1763 to 1768; and Archdeacon of Down from 1768 until his death.
