= Louis Scott (soldier) =

Lieutenant-Colonel Louis Scott OBE DCM ED (1887–1967) served in the First and Second World Wars, and led a resurgence of the Legion of Frontiersmen in Canada between the wars.

Originally from Brighton, England, Scott enlisted with Princess Patricia's Canadian Light Infantry of the Canadian Expeditionary Force as a private in August 1914. There, he served as a Regimental Sergeant Major from May 1915 to December 1915 before becoming an instructor for the Royal Air Force. He recruited 'C' Company, First Battalion of the Edmonton Regiment, which he commanded until 1927.

Scott was approached to assume command of the Canadian Legion of Frontiersmen (LoF), a patriotic paramilitary organization that had become inactive after the war. He accepted, and under Scott's decade-long leadership beginning in 1929, the Legion of Frontiersmen was revived in Canada and enjoyed a renaissance in Canada. In 1933, the LoF's Imperial Headquarters in London granted Divisional Status to the LoF under Scott. A constitution was drawn up, units were established across the country, and Scott arranged for the purchase of 200 acres (0.81 km^{2}) of land near Edmonton, Alberta to serve as field headquarters, subsequently christened "Fort Scott." In 1936, the Legion of Frontiersmen affiliated with the Royal Canadian Mounted Police and were called upon to provide security during the 1939 cross-country visit of King George VI and Queen Elizabeth. That same year the RCMP severed official ties with the Legion of Frontiersmen after a schism split the Canadian Division. Frontiersmen again mobilized their members for the Second World War, although without official recognition as an organization. Scott served with the 49th Battalion.
