= Greg Smith (rugby league) =

US rugby league footballer, track & field coach

Personal information
- Born: January 16, 1972 (age 54) DeRidder, Louisiana, United States

Playing information
- Position: Wing
Club
Years	Team	Pld	T	G	FG	P
1999	Newcastle Knights	1	0	0	0	0

Greg Smith (born January 16, 1972) is an American track and field coach who is well known for playing a single rugby league game for the Newcastle Knights in Australia's National Rugby League in 1999.

== Playing career ==
=== American football ===
Smith attended Fort Hays State University and Western State College of Colorado, where he played American football as a wide receiver. He signed with the Philadelphia Eagles as a free agent in 1996, but was later cut from the squad and did not appear in the NFL.

=== Rugby league ===
Smith represented the United States at the 1997 Rugby League World Sevens.

Warren Ryan, who had coached the United States at the World Sevens, brought Smith to the Newcastle Knights as a pre-season trialist in 1999. During an injury crisis at the club, Smith made his one and only NRL appearance in Newcastle's 26–28 loss to Canterbury in round 3. He is remembered for his poor performance, in which he dropped the ball multiple times, missed multiple tackles, and allowed Canterbury to score two tries as Newcastle surrendered a 24–4 lead.

Smith was accused of misrepresenting his time with Philadelphia in order to earn a contract with Newcastle after the media learned he had not actually played in the NFL. Smith maintains that no such claim was ever made.

Smith is reputed to have vanished from rugby league circles after the match. However, he continued to play in the Metropolitan Cup after he was released by Newcastle mid-season.

== Post-playing career ==
Smith is now a full-time track and field coach in Sydney at junior and elite level. He has coached Anthony Alozie, Taylor Doyle, and Bendere Oboya.

Smith was a running coach on the set of the 2014 film Unbroken.

Smith's coaching accreditation was suspended in June 2018 during an ASADA investigation. He successfully appealed the decision, arguing that he was not an athlete when he tested positive for Ligandrol.
