= David Greene (rugby league) =

Australian rugby league footballer

Personal information
- Full name: David Greene
- Born: 2 July 1964 (age 61); Sydney, New South Wales, Australia

Playing information
- Position: Fullback, Centre, Wing
Club
Years	Team	Pld	T	G	FG	P
1982–83	Western Suburbs	25	6	26	0	76
1983–85	Eastern Suburbs	24	4	15	0	46
1986–92	Penrith Panthers	79	27	0	0	108
	Total	128	37	41	0	230
- Source: As of 9 April 2019

David Greene (born 2 July 1964) is an Australian former professional rugby league footballer who played in the 1980s and 1990s. He played for the Penrith Panthers, Western Suburbs and Eastern Suburbs in the New South Wales Rugby League (NSWRL) competition.

== Background ==
Greene played his junior rugby league for St Gregory's and represented the Australian Schoolboys in 1982.

== Playing career ==
Greene made his first grade debut for Western Suburbs against South Sydney at Pratten Park in Round 23 1982. In 1983, Greene finished as Western Suburbs top point scorer as the club finished last on the table claiming the wooden spoon. In 1984, Greene joined Eastern Suburbs. In his first year at the club, Easts narrowly avoided the wooden spoon and in 1985 he missed the entire year through injury before being released.

In 1986, Greene joined Penrith and became a regular in the team over the following seasons. In 1990, Greene played 19 games for Penrith as reached their first ever grand final against the Canberra Raiders. Greene played at fullback as Penrith lost the match 18-14.

In 1991, Greene made only one appearance as Penrith would go on to reach their second grand final in a rematch against Canberra and on this occasion winning their first premiership. Greene made two appearances in 1992. His final game in first grade was a 8-2 loss against the North Sydney Bears in Round 9 1992.
