= Phil Attell =

Australian rugby league player

Phil Attell (born 1957) is an Australian former professional rugby league footballer. He played fullback for the Wynnum-Manly Seagulls of the Brisbane Rugby League and was a member of the 1982 and 1986 BRL First Grade premiership side.

== Playing career ==
Prior to playing for Wynnum-Manly, Attell played district representative rugby league for Wynnum North State School, winning two consecutive Metropolitan Grand Finals in 1968 and 1969. Attell made his debut for the Seagulls at 22 years of age in 1978. He played for Wynnum Manly from 1978 to 1982, before making a return for the side in 1986.

In 1982, Wynnum Manly convincingly defeated the Valleys Diehards 26–5 in the Preliminary Final, to advance to the BRL Grand Final. The Seagulls defeated the Souths Magpies 17–3. This was the first time Wynnum Manly had won a BRL grand final in club history.

Attell was a part of the 1986 Wynnum Manly team who faced Past Brothers in the grand final. Attell scored in the corner and Wally Lewis also scored a try to help Wynnum Manly win 14–6 to win the club's third premiership in five years.
