= Scott Lewis (rugby league) =

Australian professional rugby league footballer

Scott "Bones" Lewis
Personal information
- Full name: Scott Lewis
- Born: 17 September 1963 (age 63) Hawthorne, Queensland, Australia

Playing information
- Position: Halfback, Wing, Centre
Club
Years	Team	Pld	T	G	FG	P
1983–85	Fortitude Valley	19	7	0	0	28
1983–84	Wakefield Trinity	6	6	0	0	24
1986–87	Wynnum-Manly	31	13	0	0	52
	Total	56	26	0	0	104
Representative
Years	Team	Pld	T	G	FG	P
1986	Brisbane	1	1	0	0	4
- Education: Brisbane State High School
- Relatives: Lachlan Lewis (son); Wally Lewis (brother); Lincoln Lewis (nephew)

Scott Lewis (born 17 September 1963) is an Australian former rugby league footballer, best known for playing alongside his brother Wally in the Brisbane Rugby League during the 1980s, winning a premiership with Wynnum-Manly in 1986. A utility back, Lewis primarily played on the wing, though his preferred position was halfback. Lewis is the father of former Canterbury-Bankstown Bulldogs halfback Lachlan Lewis.

== Background ==
Lewis was born in Hawthorne, Queensland. His father, Jimmy, played first grade rugby league at wing or fullback for Brisbane clubs Wests and Souths, later becoming coach of the Wynnum-Manly club. His mother, June, was a Queensland representative netball player. Like his brother Wally, Lewis was a Fortitude Valley junior. According to his nephew Lincoln, Lewis and his brother are butchers by trade.

== Rugby League career ==
Lewis made his first-grade debut for Fortitude Valley in round 11 of the 1983 season, playing two games at halfback after an injury to Ross Henrick.

During the 1983-84 offseason, Lewis followed his older brother to Wakefield Trinity, making his debut for the club in their 16–32 loss to Hull F.C. in round 15. Lewis played 5 games in the centres for the English club and once on the wing, scoring a total of 6 tries. Lewis scored his first career double in Wakefield's 28–22 win over Oldham in round 17.

In the 1984 season, Lewis remained at Fortitude Valley despite his brother Wally's move to Wynnum-Manly. Lewis gave an impressive performance in the 1984 Woolies Pre-season, being hospitalised with a hip injury in Round 3 but returning to score a try in the side's 24–12 win over Eastern Suburbs in round 4. Lewis also scored a try in all 3 of Fortitude Valley's first-grade matches in the Winfield State League, including the only try in Valleys 9–8 win over Redcliffe in Round 5. Despite this, Lewis failed to earn a place in Fortitude Valley's starting side for the regular season until round 12, when he replaced Scott Nicholls on the wing and scored a try in the Diehards' 16–8 win over Past Brothers. Lewis scored another try the next week in Fortitude Valley's 26–10 win over Northern Suburbs, before being replaced on the wing by Nicholls in round 14. Lewis earned another place in the starting side in round 15, playing two games at lock.

Lewis played five first-grade games in 1985, all at halfback, after Grant Rix suffered a season-ending injury.

In 1986, Lewis signed with Wynnum-Manly, where his brother Wally had been appointed captain-coach. Lewis' first appearance for the club came in round 2 of the Woolies Pre-season, where he moved from the wing to halfback late in the match and scored a 60-metre intercept try. Lewis was selected for the Brisbane rugby league team in the 1986 National Panasonic Cup, and played in the side's 10–18 loss to the Manly Warringah Sea Eagles on 16 April, scoring a try. After spending most of the pre-season in the halves, Lewis moved back to the wing for his first-grade club debut in round 1 of the regular season. Lewis played in the centres in Wynnum-Manly's 12–20 loss to his old club, Fortitude Valley, in round 6 of the regular season. Lewis scored his first try for the Seagulls in their 16–36 loss to Redcliffe in round 7. Lewis scored the first try in the 1986 Woolies Trophy match, contested between Wynnum-Manly and Fortitude Valley between rounds 12 and 13 of the BRL season. The next week, Lewis scored his first BRL double in Wynnum-Manly's 46–12 win over Eastern Suburbs. Lewis played on the wing in the 1986 BRL Grand Final against Past Brothers, which Wynnum-Manly won 14–6.

Lewis remained with Wynnum-Manly in 1987, primarily playing on the wing. He scored a double in the Seagulls' 24–0 victory over Redcliffe in round 5 of the Woolies Pre-Season competition. Lewis also scored a double in the Seagulls' 36–14 victory over Redcliffe in the 1987 Winfield State League Final.

Lewis signed with the newly formed Brisbane Broncos in 1988, but was injured and forced into retirement prior to the season commencing, never playing a game for the club.

== Statistics ==
Season	Team	Matches	T	G	F/G	Pts
1983	Fortitude Valley	2	0	0	0	0
1983-84	Wakefield Trinity	6	6	0	0	24
1984	Fortitude Valley	11	6	0	0	24
1985	Fortitude Valley	6	1	0	0	4
1986	Wynnum-Manly	15	5	0	0	20
1987	Wynnum-Manly	16	8	0	0	32
Career totals		56	26	0	0	104
