= Barry Walker =

Australian rugby league footballer

Personal information
- Full name: Barry Walker
- Born: 24 March 1968 (age 57) Sydney, New South Wales, Australia

Playing information
- Position: Second-row, Prop
Club
Years	Team	Pld	T	G	FG	P
1988–96	Penrith Panthers	117	9	0	0	36
- Source: As of 9 April 2019

Barry Walker (born 24 March 1968) is an Australian former professional rugby league footballer who played in the 1980s and 1990s. He played for the Penrith Panthers in the New South Wales Rugby League (NSWRL) competition.

== Playing career ==
Walker made his first grade debut for Penrith against North Sydney at Penrith Park in Round 18 1988. In 1989, Walker was part of the Penrith side which enjoyed their best season since coming into the competition in 1967 by finishing second on the table and qualifying for the finals. Walker played in both finals games as Penrith were defeated by Balmain and Canberra in consecutive weeks.

In 1990, Penrith reached their first grand final against the Canberra Raiders. Walker played in the game at prop as Penrith trailed at halftime before losing 18–14. In 1991, Penrith changed their jersey design from brown and white to the now famous licorice all sorts design. Penrith again reached the grand final in a rematch of the previous years decider against Canberra. Walker played at prop in the game as Penrith trailed at halftime before coming back in the second half to win their first premiership in a tense final 19–12 at the Sydney Football Stadium.

In the following years, Penrith failed to reach the finals as some of their players from the 1991 premiership victory either retired or moved on to other clubs such as club legend Royce Simmons, Mark Geyer and Brad Fittler. Walker remained loyal to Penrith and played with the club up until the end of the 1996 season before retiring. Following an injury that ended his career, Barry joined the Ambulance Service of NSW as a Paramedic and spent his Paramedic career at Mt Druitt station. Barry was one of the first responders to attend the Glenbrook rail disaster in Glenbrook NSW.

== The early years ==
Parents Bev & Dennis Walker

Primary school Paterson Primary School NSW (year-year)
