= Gary Smith (rugby league) =

Australian rugby league footballer and administrator

Personal information
- Full name: Gary William Smith
- Born: 3 March 1963 (age 62); Nanango, Queensland, Australia

Playing information
- Position: Second-row, Lock
Club
Years	Team	Pld	T	G	FG	P
	Caloundra
	Brothers (Brisbane)
1988–92	North Sydney	49	4	0	0	16
	Total	49	4	0	0	16
Representative
Years	Team	Pld	T	G	FG	P
1987	Queensland	2	0	0	0	0

Gary Smith is an Australian former professional rugby league footballer who played in the 1980s and 1990s. A Queensland State of Origin representative forward, he played club football in the Brisbane Rugby League for Brothers and in the New South Wales Rugby League for the North Sydney Bears.

== Playing career ==
After playing junior football for Nanango, Smith made his senior debut at the age of 17 for the Caloundra club before playing in the Brisbane Rugby League Premiership for the Brothers club. Smith toured New Zealand with Queensland in 1987, playing in a match against the Kiwis. Smith was also selected to play for Queensland in the 1987 State of Origin series' first match. At the end if the 1987 season Smith played in Brothers' BRL Grand final victory.

Smith signed with the North Sydney Bears from the 1988 NSWRL season. He played with them in the Winfield Cup until 1992. Smith's final game for Norths was the 1992 reserve grade grand final, which Norths won 28–14 over Balmain at the Sydney Football Stadium. In the post-match awards ceremony, Smith jokingly exclaimed, "Too easy!" when collecting the trophy which prompted sections of the crowd to jeer him for a perceived display of arrogance.
