= Trevor Bailey (rugby league) =

Australian rugby league footballer and coach

Personal information
- Born: 28 September 1961 (age 63); Brisbane, Queensland

Playing information
- Position: Hooker
Club
Years	Team	Pld	T	G	FG	P
1980–87, 91	Brothers (Brisbane)	132	42	63	1	295
1988–90	St. George	66	12	0	0	48
	Total	198	54	63	1	343

Coaching information
Club
Years	Team	Gms	W	D	L	W%
1986–87	Wakefield Trinity
- Source: Whiticker Hudson

Trevor Bailey (born 28 September 1961) is an Australian former professional rugby league footballer who played in the 1980s. He played in the Brisbane Rugby League Premiership for the Brothers club and in the New South Wales Rugby League Premiership for the St. George Dragons.

== Career ==
He played in the Brisbane Rugby League Premiership as the hooker and captain on the Brothers club Trevor Bailey in the 1987 Grand Final, before signing on to play in Sydney. He went on to play three seasons with the St. George Dragons between 1988 and 1990 under the coaching of Ted Glossop and Craig Young. Bailey was a member of the first grade team during those seasons and was hooker in the victorious St. George Dragons team that won the 1988 Panasonic Cup.
