= List of South Queensland Crushers players =

This is a list of rugby league footballers who have played first grade for the South Queensland Crushers. Players are listed in the order they made their debut.

== Players ==
Club
No.	Name	Career	Appearance	Tries	Goals	Field goals	Points	Positions
1	Anthony Bella	1995−1997	24	1	0	0	4	
2	St. John Ellis	1995	10	1	13	0	30	
3	Mario Fenech	1995	11	0	0	0	0	
4	Mike Ford	1995	15	3	0	0	12	
5	Trevor Gillmeister	1995−1996	41	3	0	0	12	
6	Anthony Herbert	1995	2	0	0	0	0	
7	Ray Herring	1995	6	0	0	0	0	
8	Mark Hohn	1995	22	0	0	0	0	
9	Brett Horsnell	1995−1996	38	3	0	0	12	
10	Travis Norton	1995−1996	33	7	14	0	56	
11	Scott Sattler	1995−1996	8	0	0	0	0	
12	Wayne Simonds	1995	20	2	0	0	8	
13	Craig Teevan	1995−1997	58	3	0	0	12	
14	Nathan Turner	1995−1996	8	0	4	0	8	
15	Craig Weston	1995−1996	14	6	1	0	26	
16	Jeff Wittenberg	1995−1996	19	0	0	0	0	
17	David Krause	1995−1996	23	10	0	0	40	
18	Fili Seru	1995	10	2	0	0	8	
19	Wayne Collins	1995−1996	9	1	0	0	4	
20	Terry Cook	1995−1996	25	3	0	0	12	
21	Glen Liddiard	1995	14	4	3	1	23	
22	Garrick Morgan	1995	2	0	0	0	0	
23	Darren Plowman	1995−1996	21	6	0	0	24	
24	Grant Young	1995−1996	33	0	3	0	6	
25	Martin Locke	1995	18	1	0	0	4	
26	Chris McKenna	1995−1996	29	3	0	0	12	
27	Craig O'Dwyer	1995−1996	9	1	0	0	4	
28	John Jones	1995−1997	24	1	0	0	4	
29	Dale Shearer	1995−1996	10	5	0	1	21	
30	Tony Kemp	1995	8	2	15	0	38	
31	Kevin Carmichael	1995−1996	6	0	0	0	0	
32	Gary Jarrett	1995−1996	13	2	4	0	16	
33	Scott Lawson	1995−1996	4	1	0	0	4	
34	Bruce Cook	1995	1	0	0	0	0	
35	Rod Doyle	1995−1996	7	2	0	0	8	
36	Craig Bowen	1996	4	0	0	0	0	
37	Nigel Gaffey	1996	20	4	0	0	16	
38	Tony Hearn	1996	10	0	0	0	0	
39	Jason Hudson	1996−1997	39	11	3	0	50	
40	Graham Mackay	1996	8	43	41	0	0	
41	Clinton O'Brien	1996−1997	30	1	0	0	4	
42	Danny Peacock	1996	11	1	0	0	4	
43	Troy Pezet	1996−1997	20	7	5	0	38	
44	Mark Protheroe	1996−1997	34	6	0	0	24	
45	Phillip Lee	1996	19	1	0	0	4	
46	Clinton Schifcofske	1996−1997	23	7	40	0	108	
47	Kerry Carmichael	1996−1997	15	3	0	0	12	
48	Jason Wendt	1996−1997	22	5	0	0	20	
49	Mark Tookey	1996−1997	18	3	0	0	12	
50	Matt Bickerstaff	1996−1997	17	3	0	0	12	
51	Jeremy Smith	1996−1997	5	0	0	0	0	
52	Paul Tideman	1996	1	0	0	0	0	
53	Nathan Antonik	1996−1997	20	0	1	0	2	
54	David Couper	1997	9	0	0	0	0	
55	Michael Eagar	1997	20	5	0	0	20	
56	Steele Retchless	1997	22	3	0	0	12	
57	Mat Toshack	1997	19	5	0	0	20	
58	Dave Watson	1997	13	1	0	0	4	
59	Craig Wilson	1997	20	3	0	3	15	
60	Brian Doyle	1997	5	1	0	0	4	
61	Andrew Hamilton	1997	7	3	0	0	12	
62	Paul Hubbard	1997	9	1	0	0	4	
63	Ben Roedder	1997	2	0	0	0	0	
64	Don Saunders	1997	13	0	0	0	0	
65	Steve Cairns	1997	5	0	0	0	0	
66	Heath Cruckshank	1997	2	0	0	0	0	
67	Phil Mooney	1997	1	0	0	0	0	
68	Paul Woodward	1997	2	0	0	0	0	
69	Danny Nutley	1997	10	0	0	0	0	
70	Nathan Sologinkin	1997	10	1	0	0	4	
71	Aaron Moule	1997	9	3	0	0	12	
72	Michael Davis	1997	1	0	0	0	0	
73	Scott Thorburn	1997	1	0	0	0	0	
74	Robert Bella	1997	1	0	0	0	0	
