= 2015 Brisbane Broncos season =

Coordinates: 27°27′53″S 153°0′34″E

- NRL rank: 2nd
- Play-off result: Lost Grand Final, (North Queensland Cowboys, 16-17)
- World Club Series: Won Game 2, (Wigan Warriors, 14-12)
- 2015 record: Wins: 18; losses: 7
- Points scored: For: 574; against: 379

Team information
- CEO: Paul White
- Coach: Wayne Bennett
- Captain: Justin Hodges
- Stadium: Suncorp Stadium
- Avg. attendance: 33,595
- Agg. attendance: 403,136
- High attendance: 51,826 (Melbourne Storm, 3 September)
- Low attendance: 24,566 (Penrith Panthers, 8 May)

Top scorers
- Tries: Lachlan Maranta (16)
- Goals: Corey Parker (69)
- Points: Corey Parker (150)
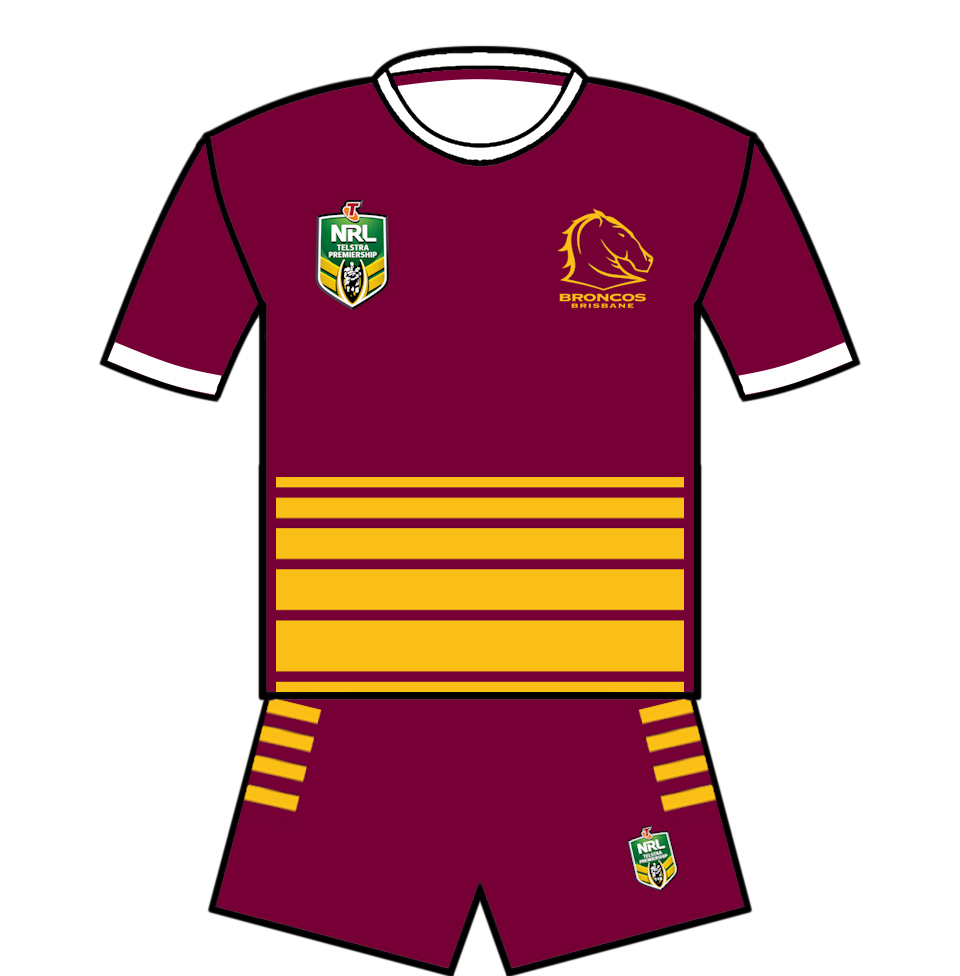
Home colours
← 2014	List of seasons	2016 →

The 2015 Brisbane Broncos season was the 28th in the club's history. The team is based in Brisbane, Queensland, Australia. Coached again for the first time since 2008 by returning foundation coach, Wayne Bennett, and captained by Justin Hodges, they competed in the NRL's 2015 Telstra Premiership. The Broncos finished the regular season in 2nd place to make the play-offs, going on to reach the 2015 NRL Grand final in which they were defeated by the North Queensland Cowboys.

== Season summary ==
=== Milestones ===
- Round 1: Adam Blair, James Gavet and Anthony Milford made their debuts for the club.
- Round 1: Corey Parker played his 300th career game.
- Round 2: Kodi Nikorima and Joe Ofahengaue made their first grade debuts.
- Round 2: Andrew McCullough played his 150th career game.
- Round 4: Jarrod Wallace scored his 1st career try.
- Round 5: Mitch Garbutt made his debut for the club.
- Round 7: Alex Glenn played his 150th career game and Jack Reed his 100th career game.
- Round 7: Daniel Vidot scored his 50th career try.
- Round 8: Anthony Milford played his 50th career game.
- Round 8: Corey Parker kicked his 500th career goal.
- Round 9: Lachlan Maranta played his 50th career game.
- Round 10: Adam Blair played his 200th career game.
- Round 11: Joe Boyce made his first grade debut.
- Round 12: Matt Parcell made his first grade debut.
- Round 20: Kodi Nikorima scored his 1st career try.
- Grand Final: Justin Hodges played his final career game.
- Grand Final: Brisbane Broncos lose their first grand final.

== Squad List ==
As of 4 October 2015

Cap.	Nat.	Player	Position	First Broncos game	Previous First Grade RL club
100	(Australia)	Justin Hodges (c)	Centre	2000	(Australia) Sydney Roosters
106	(Australia)	Corey Parker	Lock	2001	—N/a
127	(Australia)	David Stagg	Second-row	2003	(Australia) Canterbury-Bankstown Bulldogs
128	(Australia)	Sam Thaiday	Prop	2003	—N/a
141	(Australia)	Darius Boyd	Fullback	2006	(Australia) Newcastle Knights
163	(Australia)	Andrew McCullough	Hooker	2008	—N/a
172	(New Zealand)	Alex Glenn	Second-row	2009	—N/a
174	(Samoa)	Josh McGuire	Prop	2009	—N/a
177	(Australia)	Dale Copley	Centre	2009	—N/a
178	(Australia)	Ben Hunt	Halfback	2009	—N/a
182	(Australia)	Matt Gillett	Second-row	2010	—N/a
183	(Australia)	Mitchell Dodds	Prop	2010	—N/a
190	(England)	Jack Reed	Centre	2011	—N/a
195	(Australia)	Lachlan Maranta	Wing	2012	—N/a
196	(Australia)	Jarrod Wallace	Prop	2012	—N/a
198	(Australia)	Aaron Whitchurch	Centre	2012	—N/a
199	(New Zealand)	Jordan Kahu	Wing	2013	—N/a
201	(Australia)	Corey Oates	Wing	2013	—N/a
203	(Australia)	Jordan Drew	Centre	2013	—N/a
205	(Samoa)	Daniel Vidot	Wing	2014	(Australia) St. George Illawarra Dragons
207	(Australia)	Todd Lowrie	Lock	2014	New Zealand Warriors
208	(Cook Islands)	Francis Molo	Prop	2014	—N/a
209	(Samoa)	Anthony Milford	Five-eighth	2015	(Australia) Canberra Raiders
210	(New Zealand)	Adam Blair	Prop	2015	(Australia) Wests Tigers
211	(New Zealand)	James Gavet	Prop	2015	(Australia) Wests Tigers
212	(Tonga)	Joe Ofahengaue	Lock	2015	—N/a
213	(New Zealand)	Kodi Nikorima	Hooker	2015	—N/a
215	(Australia)	Joe Boyce	Lock	2015	—N/a
216	(Australia)	Matt Parcell	Hooker	2015	—N/a
217	(Australia)	Ashley Taylor	Halfback	2015	—N/a
–	(Australia)	Ajuma Adams	Second-row	Yet to debut	—N/a
–	(England)	Greg Eden	Wing	Yet to debut	(England) Castleford Tigers
–	(Australia)	Jon Green	Prop	Yet to debut	(Australia) Cronulla-Sutherland Sharks
–	(Australia)	Brett Greinke	Second-row	Yet to debut	—N/a
–	(Australia)	Tom Opacic	Centre	Yet to debut	—N/a
–	(Australia)	Zach Strasser	Five-eighth	Yet to debut	—N/a
–	(Australia)	Travis Waddell	Hooker	Yet to debut	(Australia) Newcastle Knights

== Squad Movement ==
=== Gains ===
Date	Position	Player	From	Year/s	Ref.
27 November 2013	Five-eighth	Anthony Milford	Canberra Raiders	2 Years	
16 July 2014	Prop	Mitch Garbutt	Melbourne Storm	2 Years	
1 September 2014	Wing	Greg Eden	Hull Kingston Rovers	2 Years	
5 September 2014	Hooker	Travis Waddell	Newcastle Knights	2 Years	
13 October 2014	Prop	James Gavet	Wests Tigers	2 Years	
13 October 2014	Hooker	Matt Parcell	Ipswich Jets	1 Year	
18 November 2014	Prop	Adam Blair	Wests Tigers	3 Years	
21 November 2014	Fullback	Darius Boyd	Newcastle Knights	3 Years	

=== Losses ===
Date	Position	Player	To	Year/s	Ref.
22 July 2014	Hooker	Jake Granville	North Queensland Cowboys	2 Years	
29 August 2014	Five-eighth	Duncan Paia'aua	Queensland Reds	2 Years	
7 October 2014	Prop	Ben Hannant	North Queensland Cowboys	1 Year	
29 October 2014	Prop	Martin Kennedy	Sydney Roosters	2 Years	
29 October 2014	Prop	David Hala	Gold Coast Titans	2 Years	
30 October 2014	Five-eighth	Josh Hoffman	Gold Coast Titans	3 Years	
11 November 2014	Fullback	Ben Barba	Cronulla-Sutherland Sharks	3 Years	
28 November 2014	Halfback	Cameron Cullen	Mackay Cutters	—N/a	
1 December 2014	Wing	Marmin Barba	Ipswich Jets	—N/a	
24 June 2015	Prop	Mitch Garbutt	Leeds Rhinos	Mid-season	

=== Re-signings ===
Date	Position	Player	Year/s	Ref.
23 January 2015	Prop	Josh McGuire	2 Years	
15 April 2015	Hooker	Andrew McCullough	2 Years	
12 May 2015	Five-eighth	Kodi Nikorima	1 Year	
1 June 2015	Prop	Joe Ofahengaue	2 Years	
19 August 2015	Wing	Jordan Kahu	2 Years	
19 August 2015	Second-row	Alex Glenn	2 Years	

=== Contract lengths ===
Player	2015	2016	2017	2018	2019	Ref.
Ajuma Adams	Brisbane Broncos	Sunshine Coast Falcons				
Jai Arrow	Brisbane Broncos					
Adam Blair	Brisbane Broncos					
Joe Boyce	Brisbane Broncos					
Darius Boyd	Brisbane Broncos					
Dale Copley	Brisbane Broncos	Sydney Roosters				
Mitchell Dodds	Brisbane Broncos	Warrington Wolves				
Jordan Drew	Brisbane Broncos	Cronulla-Sutherland Sharks				
Greg Eden	Brisbane Broncos					
James Gavet	Brisbane Broncos	New Zealand Warriors				
Matt Gillett	Brisbane Broncos					
Alex Glenn	Brisbane Broncos					
Jon Green	Brisbane Broncos	Retired				
Brett Greinke	Brisbane Broncos					
Justin Hodges	Brisbane Broncos	Retired				
Ben Hunt	Brisbane Broncos					
Jordan Kahu	Brisbane Broncos					
Todd Lowrie	Brisbane Broncos	Newcastle Knights				
Lachlan Maranta	Brisbane Broncos					
Andrew McCullough	Brisbane Broncos					
Josh McGuire	Brisbane Broncos					
Anthony Milford	Brisbane Broncos					
Francis Molo	Brisbane Broncos					
Jayden Nikorima	Brisbane Broncos	Sydney Roosters				
Kodi Nikorima	Brisbane Broncos					
Corey Oates	Brisbane Broncos					
Joe Ofahengaue	Brisbane Broncos					
Tom Opacic	Brisbane Broncos					
Matt Parcell	Brisbane Broncos	Manly-Warringah Sea Eagles				
Corey Parker	Brisbane Broncos					
Jack Reed	Brisbane Broncos					
David Stagg	Brisbane Broncos	Retired				
Zach Strasser	Brisbane Broncos	Redcliffe Dolphins				
Ashley Taylor	Brisbane Broncos	Gold Coast Titans				
Sam Thaiday	Brisbane Broncos					
Daniel Vidot	Brisbane Broncos	Salford Red Devils				
Travis Waddell	Brisbane Broncos					
Jarrod Wallace	Brisbane Broncos					
Aaron Whitchurch	Brisbane Broncos					

== Coaching staff ==
Name	Role	Ref.
Wayne Bennett	Head coach	
Stephen Kearney	Assistant Coach	
Kevin Walters	Assistant Coach	
Allan Langer	Assistant Coach	
Alex Corvo	Performance Specialist	
Jeremy Hicksman	Performance Director	

== Ladder ==
2015 NRL season
Pos	Team	Pld	W	D	L	B	PF	PA	PD	Pts
1	Sydney Roosters	24	18	0	6	2	591	300	+291	40
2	Brisbane Broncos	24	17	0	7	2	574	379	+195	38
3	North Queensland Cowboys (P)	24	17	0	7	2	587	454	+133	38
4	Melbourne Storm	24	14	0	10	2	467	348	+119	32
5	Canterbury-Bankstown Bulldogs	24	14	0	10	2	522	480	+42	32
6	Cronulla-Sutherland Sharks	24	14	0	10	2	469	476	−7	32
7	South Sydney Rabbitohs	24	13	0	11	2	465	467	−2	30
8	St. George Illawarra Dragons	24	12	0	12	2	435	408	+27	28
9	Manly-Warringah Sea Eagles	24	11	0	13	2	458	492	−34	26
10	Canberra Raiders	24	10	0	14	2	577	569	+8	24
11	Penrith Panthers	24	9	0	15	2	399	477	−78	22
12	Parramatta Eels	24	9	0	15	2	448	573	−125	22
13	New Zealand Warriors	24	9	0	15	2	445	588	−143	22
14	Gold Coast Titans	24	9	0	15	2	439	636	−197	22
15	Wests Tigers	24	8	0	16	2	487	562	−75	20
16	Newcastle Knights	24	8	0	16	2	458	612	−154	20

== Fixtures ==
=== Pre-season ===
Date	Round	Opponent	Venue	Score	Tries	Goals	Attendance
Saturday, 7 February	Trial 1	North Queensland Cowboys	Stadium Mackay	6-18	Nikorima	Milford (1/1)	8,000
Saturday, 21 February	Trial 2	Wigan Warriors	DW Stadium	14-12 ET (12-12)	McCullough, Maranta	Parker (3/4)	20,842
Legend: Win Loss Draw

==== NRL Auckland Nines ====
The NRL Auckland Nines is a pre-season rugby league nines competition featuring all 16 NRL clubs. The 2015 competition was played over two days on 31 January and 1 February at Eden Park. The Broncos feature in the Piha pool and played the Bulldogs, Sharks and Roosters.

Piha Pool
Team	Pld	W	D	L	PF	PA	PD	Pts
Cronulla-Sutherland Sharks	3	3	0	0	68	22	+46	6
Sydney Roosters	3	2	0	1	30	30	+0	4
Brisbane Broncos	3	1	0	2	21	37	-16	2
Canterbury-Bankstown Bulldogs	3	0	0	3	10	40	-30	0

Date	Time (Local)	Round	Opponent	Venue	Score	Tries	Goals
Saturday, 31 January	3:10pm	Round 1	Sydney Roosters	Eden Park	4-6	Nicholls	Milford (0/1)
Saturday, 31 January	7:30pm	Round 2	Cronulla-Sutherland Sharks	Eden Park	4-31	Whitchurch	Milford (0/1)
Sunday, 1 February	2:05pm	Round 3	Canterbury-Bankstown Bulldogs	Eden Park	13-0	K. Nikorima J. Nikorima	Milford (2/2)
Legend: Win Loss Draw

=== Regular season ===
Date	Round	Opponent	Venue	Score	Tries	Goals	Attendance
Thursday, 5 March	Round 1	South Sydney Rabbitohs	Suncorp Stadium	6 – 36	Gillett	Parker (1/2)	36,057
Friday, 13 March	Round 2	Cronulla-Sutherland Sharks	Remondis Stadium	2 – 10	Oates, Maranta	Parker (1/1), Hunt (0/1)	8,369
Friday, 20 March	Round 3	North Queensland Cowboys	Suncorp Stadium	44 – 22	Maranta (2), Hunt, McGuire, Parker, McCullough, Hodges, Kahu	Parker (6/8)	40,047
Sunday, 29 March	Round 4	New Zealand Warriors	Mt. Smart Stadium	16 – 24	Oates, Maranta, Wallace, McCullough	Parker (4/5)	14,670
Friday, 3 April	Round 5	Gold Coast Titans	Cbus Super Stadium	16 – 26	Milford (2), Dodds (2)	Parker (3/3), Hunt (2/2)	15,432
Friday, 10 April	Round 6	Sydney Roosters	Suncorp Stadium	22 – 18	Hunt (2), Glenn	Parker (5/5)	35,630
Friday, 17 April	Round 7	St. George Illawarra Dragons	WIN Jubilee Oval	12 – 10	Vidot, Thaiday	Milford (1/1)	13,029
Saturday, 25 April	Round 8	Parramatta Eels	Suncorp Stadium	28 – 16	Milford (2), Reed, McGuire	Parker (6/7)	34,398
Friday, 8 May	Round 9	Penrith Panthers	Suncorp Stadium	8 – 5	Kahu, Oates		24,566
Friday, 15 May	Round 10	North Queensland Cowboys	1300SMILES Stadium	31 – 20	Maranta (2), Kahu	Parker (4/4)	24,531
Monday, 25 May	Round 11	Newcastle Knights	Hunter Stadium	18 – 31	Reed (2), Milford, McCullough, Oates	Kahu (4/4), Hunt (1/2), Milford (FG)	12,673
Saturday, 30 May	Round 12	Canberra Raiders	GIO Stadium	12 – 24	Reed, Kahu, Maranta, Oates	Parker (4/5)	10,090
Friday, 5 June	Round 13	Manly-Warringah Sea Eagles	Suncorp Stadium	44 – 10	Vidot (2), Milford (2), Hodges, Hunt, Reed, Kahu	Kahu (6/9)	28,691
	Round 14	Bye					
Sunday, 21 June	Round 15	Melbourne Storm	AAMI Park	12 – 14	Maranta, Reed, Oates	Kahu (1/3)	14,278
Friday, 26 June	Round 16	Newcastle Knights	Suncorp Stadium	44 – 22	Maranta (2), Gillett (2), Oates, McCullough, Milford, Boyd	Parker (5/7), Hunt (1/1)	27,246
	Round 17	Bye					
Saturday, 11 July	Round 18	Canterbury-Bankstown Bulldogs	ANZ Stadium	8 – 16	Vidot, Thaiday, Blair	Parker (1/2), Kahu (1/1)	16,253
Sunday, 19 July	Round 19	Wests Tigers	Suncorp Stadium	42 – 16	Maranta (3), Glenn (2), Wallace, Reed, Oates	Parker (4/8), Kahu (1/2)	37,260
Friday, 24 July	Round 20	Gold Coast Titans	Suncorp Stadium	34 – 0	Parker, Boyd, Hunt, Wallace, Nikorima, Glenn	Parker (3/5), Kahu (2/2)	27,664
Saturday, 1 August	Round 21	Manly-Warringah Sea Eagles	Central Coast Stadium	44 – 14	Hodges, Maranta, Reed	Kahu (1/2), Parker (0/1)	16,280
Friday, 7 August	Round 22	Canterbury-Bankstown Bulldogs	Suncorp Stadium	16 – 18	Oates (2), Parker	Parker (2/3)	34,082
Friday, 14 August	Round 23	St. George Illawarra Dragons	Suncorp Stadium	32 – 6	Hunt (2), Kahu, Maranta, Milford, Copley	Parker (3/4), Milford (1/1), Kahu (0/1)	33,480
Saturday, 22 August	Round 24	Sydney Roosters	Allianz Stadium	12 – 10	Kahu, Oates	Kahu (1/1), Parker (0/1)	
Thursday, 27 August	Round 25	South Sydney Rabbitohs	Allianz Stadium	12 – 47	Hunt (3), Milford (2), Kahu, Oates	Parker (5/6), Kahu (2/2), Milford (FG)	12,036
Thursday, 3 September	Round 26	Melbourne Storm	Suncorp Stadium	8 – 15	Reed	Parker (0/1), Parker (PG), Milford (PG)	44,015
Legend: Win Loss Draw Bye

=== Finals ===
Qualifying and elimination finals
11 Sept, Sydney Football Stadium
1	Sydney Roosters	18
4	Melbourne	20
12 Sept, Stadium Australia
5	Canterbury	11
8	St. George Illawarra	10
13 Sept, Sydney Football Stadium
6	Cronulla	28
7	Souths	12
12 Sept, Lang Park
2	Brisbane	16
3	North Queensland	12

Semi-finals
18 Sept, Sydney Football Stadium
Sydney Roosters	38
Canterbury	12
19 Sept, Willows Sports Complex
North Queensland	39
Cronulla	0

Preliminary finals
26 Sept, Melbourne Rectangular Stadium
Melbourne	12
North Queensland	32
25 Sept, Lang Park
Brisbane	31
Sydney Roosters	12

Grand final
4 Oct, Stadium Australia
Brisbane	16
North Queensland	17

Date	Round	Opponent	Venue	Score	Tries	Goals	Attendance
Saturday, 12 September	Qualifying Final	North Queensland Cowboys	Suncorp Stadium	16 – 12	Hunt, Milford	Parker (4/4 (2 Penalty Goals))	50,388
Friday, 25 September	Preliminary Final	Sydney Roosters	Suncorp Stadium	31 – 12	Boyd, Hunt, McCullough, Oates, Milford, Reed	Parker (2/4), Kahu (1/2), Milford (FG)	51,826
Sunday, 4 October	Grand Final	North Queensland Cowboys	ANZ Stadium	16 – 17	Corey Oates, Jack Reed	Parker (2/2) (1 Penalty Goal), Kahu (2/2) (1 Penalty Goal)	82,758
Legend: Win Loss Draw

== Statistics ==
Name	App	T	G	FG	Pts
Adam Blair	23	1	0	0	4
Joe Boyce	1	0	0	0	0
Darius Boyd	18	3	0	0	12
Dale Copley	9	1	0	0	4
Mitchell Dodds	19	2	0	0	8
Mitch Garbutt	3	0	0	0	0
James Gavet	1	0	0	0	0
Matt Gillett	26	3	0	0	12
Alex Glenn	25	4	0	0	16
Justin Hodges	20	3	0	0	12
Ben Hunt	26	12	4	0	56
Jordan Kahu	22	9	22	0	80
Lachlan Maranta	20	15	0	0	60
Andrew McCullough	27	5	0	0	20
Josh McGuire	13	2	0	0	8
Anthony Milford	27	13	3	3	61
Francis Molo	5	0	0	0	0
Kodi Nikorima	20	1	0	0	4
Corey Oates	25	14	0	0	56
Joe Ofahengaue	14	0	0	0	0
Matt Parcell	6	0	0	0	0
Corey Parker	24	3	66	0	144
Jack Reed	24	11	0	0	44
David Stagg	2	0	0	0	0
Ashley Taylor	1	0	0	0	0
Sam Thaiday	23	2	0	0	8
Daniel Vidot	8	4	0	0	16
Jarrod Wallace	25	3	0	0	12
Aaron Whitchurch	2	0	0	0	0
Totals		111	95	3	637

== Representatives ==
The following players have played a representative match in 2015.

	All Stars match	City Vs Country	ANZAC Test	Pacific Test	State Of Origin 1	State Of Origin 2	State of Origin 3	Kiwis Tour
Darius Boyd	-	-	-	-	Queensland	Queensland	Queensland	-
Matt Gillett	-	-	-	-	Queensland	Queensland	Queensland	-
Justin Hodges	Indigenous All Stars	-	-	-	Queensland	Queensland	Queensland	-
Josh McGuire	-	-	-	Samoa	Queensland	Queensland	-	-
Corey Parker	NRL All Stars	-	Australia	-	Queensland	Queensland	Queensland	-
Sam Thaiday	-	-	Australia	-	Queensland	Queensland	Queensland	-
Daniel Vidot	-	-	-	Samoa	-	-	-	-
Adam Blair	-	-	-	-	-	-	-	New Zealand
Alex Glenn	-	-	-	-	-	-	-	New Zealand
Jordan Kahu	-	-	-	-	-	-	-	New Zealand
Kodi Nikorima	-	-	-	-	-	-	-	New Zealand

== Honours ==
=== Club ===
- Paul Morgan Medal: Corey Parker
- Clubman of the Year: Justin Hodges
- Rookie of the Year: Kodi Nikorima
- Best Back: Ben Hunt
- Best Forward: Sam Thaiday
- Most Consistent: Andrew McCullough
