= Jonah Pezet =

Australian rugby league footballer

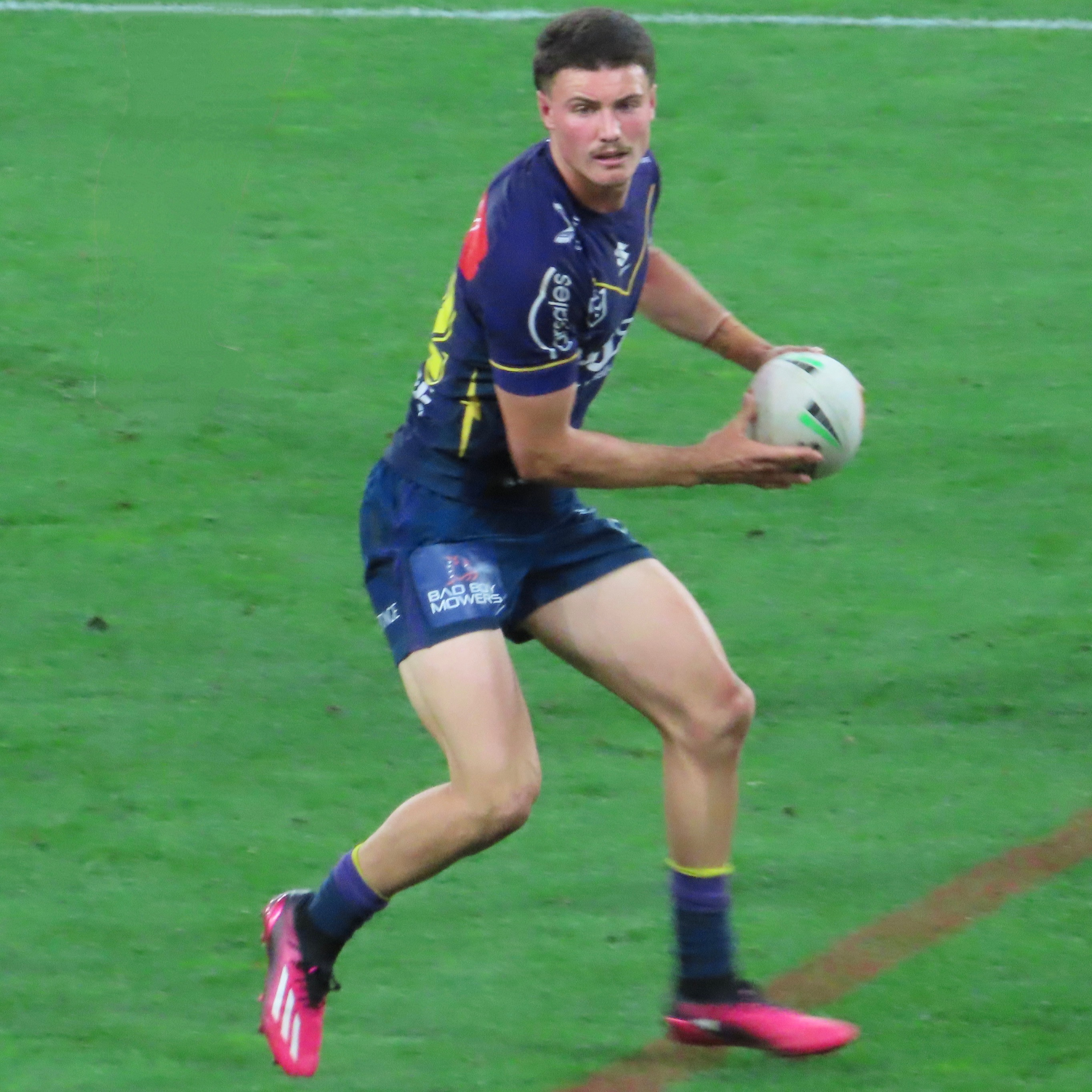

Personal information
- Full name: Jonah Pezet
- Born: 17 January 2003 (age 23) Gosford, New South Wales, Australia
- Height: 183 cm (6 ft 0 in)
- Weight: 84 kg (13 st 3 lb)

Playing information
- Position: Five-eighth, Halfback
Club
Years	Team	Pld	T	G	FG	P
2023–25	Melbourne Storm	18	2	5	0	18
2026	Parramatta Eels	7	3	4	1	21
2027–	Brisbane Broncos	0	0	0	0	0
	Total	25	5	9	1	39
- Source: As of 12 July 2026
- Father: Troy Pezet

Jonah Pezet (born 17 January 2003) is an Australian rugby league footballer who plays as a five-eighth or halfback for the Brisbane Broncos in the National Rugby League.

== Early life ==
Pezet was born at Gosford and raised in Newcastle. He is the son of Emma Pezet (nee Sinclair) and former South Queensland Crushers player Troy Pezet. Pezet was educated at St Mary's Catholic College, Gateshead. He played junior rugby league for Wyong Roos in the Central Coast Rugby League and Valentine-Eleebana Red Devils in the Newcastle Rugby League. He then signed to play as a junior representatives for the Newcastle Knights

== Playing career ==
=== Early career ===
From 2018 through the end of the 2020 season, Pezet was a member of the Newcastle Knights junior representative teams, progressing from the Harold Matthews Cup to the S. G. Ball Cup in 2020. He would move to the Melbourne Storm in 2021, playing for the Victoria Thunderbolts in the Jersey Flegg Cup, as well as the Brisbane Tigers in the Hastings Deering Colts competition. Pezet was selected to represent New South Wales in the Under 19's State of Origin 32-4 against Queensland in June 2022, and was awarded player of the match honours with four try assists.

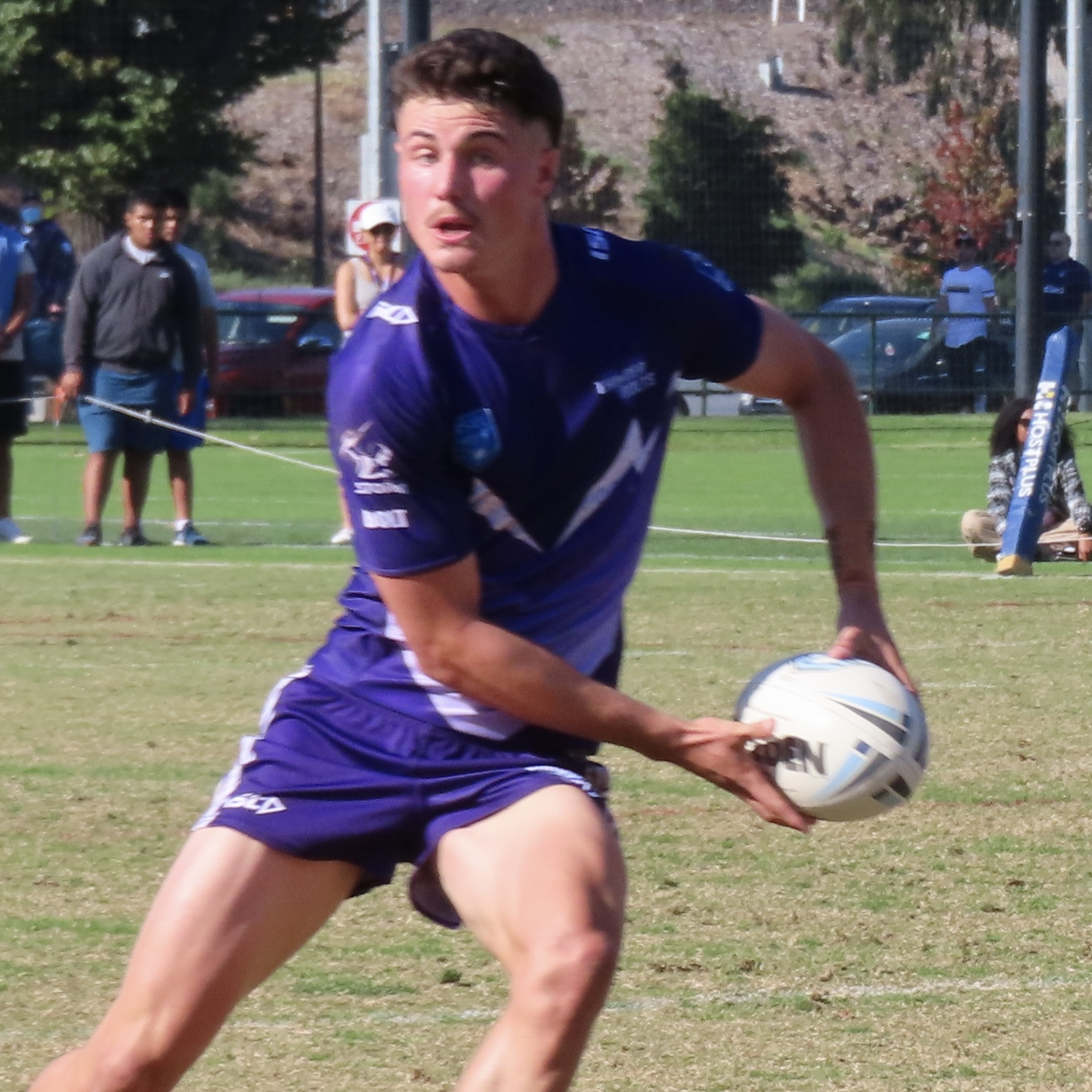
Pezet playing for Victoria Thunderbolts in 2022

Pezet would play 10 matches for Melbourne Storm affiliate club Brisbane Tigers during the 2022 Queensland Cup season. In December 2022, Pezet re-signed with Melbourne until the end of the 2025 NRL season.

=== Melbourne Storm ===
In round 3 of the 2023 NRL season, Pezet made his debut for Melbourne against Gold Coast Titans. Pezet would start the match at five-eighth and score a try in a 38–34 loss. He had his Melbourne debut jersey (cap 229) presented to him by his father and former South Queensland Crushers player Troy Pezet. Pezet also went onto win the 2023 Queensland Cup playing halfback for the Brisbane Tigers in their 22-18 grand final win over Burleigh.

Unfortunately Pezet then ruptured his ACL playing for the Tigers in April 2024 but on 20 December 2024, the Storm announced that Pezet had re-signed with the club until the end of the 2029 season.

On 29 October 2025, Parramatta announced that they had signed Pezet of the 2026 season. On the same day it was announced that Brisbane also announced signing Pezet on a three-year deal from 2027.

=== Parramatta Eels ===
In round 1 of the 2026 NRL season, Pezet made his club debut for Parramatta against his former side Melbourne which ended in a 52-4 loss. In round 6, Pezet suffered a hamstring injury during Parramatta's golden point extra-time loss against the Wests Tigers and was later ruled out for seven weeks. After spending thirteen weeks outside of first grade due to injury and poor form, Pezet was recalled to the Parramatta side for their round 18 match against Manly which Parramatta won 23-14 with Pezet scoring a try and kicking a drop goal. Pezet played just seven matches for Parramatta in the 2026 NRL season as the club finished 13th on the table.

== Statistics ==
Year	Team	Games	Tries	Goals	FG	Pts
2023	Melbourne Storm	7	2	2		12
2024	Melbourne Storm	3				
2025	Melbourne Storm	8		3		6
2026	Parramatta Eels	7	3	4	1	21
2027	Brisbane Broncos					
	Totals	23	5	9	1	39
