= Barry Maranta =

Australian businessman

Barry Maranta (born 18 December 1934), is an Australian businessman and co-founder of the Brisbane Broncos rugby league team. As well as being a founder of the Broncos he is currently a Sky Shades president. His grandson Lachlan Maranta, became a Brisbane Broncos player.

An Old Boy of Marist College Rosalie in Brisbane and a former first grade cricketer and rugby league footballer, Maranta became a sports consultant and entered into a partnership with Wayne Reid, forming the organisation, International Sports Management. After seeing an interstate Australian rules football match that utilised "state of origin" selection rules in 1978, he started trying to convince Queensland Rugby League president Ron McAuliffe to instigate a similar concept in rugby league. This would ultimately have long-ranging effects as the State of Origin series phenomenon took off, becoming one of Australia's biggest sporting events.

By 1984, Maranta had been active in property development in Queensland for over fifteen years and was closely associated in business with former test cricketer and prominent Brisbane businessman, Greg Chappell.

In 1985, Barry Maranta expressed interest in fielding a Brisbane-based team in the New South Wales Rugby League's Winfield Cup premiership, the top-level rugby league football competition at the time. He was one of the principal owners of International Sports Management who had contributed to the advent of rugby league's State of Origin concept. In 1986, Maranta joined Paul Morgan, Gary Balkin and Steve Williams to form the Brisbane club. All men had played for Brisbane domestic teams. Four organisations made bids for the team which would be established in 1987. Ron McAuliffe, had the support of the NSWRL over the Maranta-Morgan group, other groups included 'International Syndicate' led by John Sattler and Bob Hagan, and one by Darryl van der Velde (who would later be CEO of the South Queensland Crushers).

When the NSWRL decided not to have a Brisbane club in 1987, the groups went down, but in a final bid for the 1988 season, both McAuliffe and Maranta-Morgan bid for the club. The NSWRL finally decided to have a Brisbane-based team and thus the Brisbane Broncos were born. The rights originally were going to go to the McAuliffe based group, but when it was realised that they didn't have the funds to support the club, it was given to Maranta-Morgan.

However, the Maranta-Morgan group did not please everybody, especially Australian Rugby League chairman Ken Arthurson, who decided to add other (now defunct) Queensland-based teams, Gold Coast for the 1988 season and the South Queensland Crushers in 1995 season.

Maranta was instrumental in the takeover of the ailing London Crusaders club in the British capital. London, who were founded as an offshoot of Fulham Football Club inside nine weeks and played their first competitive fixture in late August 1980, had a patchy existence until the company that owned the club went into receivership in the early spring of 1994.

The club, the only British professional rugby league club outside of the code's northern heartlands at the time, was run by the Rugby Football League while a new owner could be found. Maranta and his Brisbane colleagues saw London as a way into another top flight competition although London were playing in the second tier of British rugby league at the time.

Brisbane completed their takeover of London Crusaders in April 1994 and the renamed London Broncos began life in the August of that year. The interest of Maranta's fellow board members was proven to be short-lived however, and after London had been placed in the embryonic Super League (which was launched fully in the summer of 1996), his colleagues withdrew their interest. Maranta and fellow director Gary Balkin remained but Virgin Group founder Richard Branson took an initial stake in the club and later increased his holding to outright ownership after Maranta sold his interest in 1998.

Maranta returned to Australia. The London Broncos made their only Challenge Cup Final appearance so far at the old Wembley Stadium in May 1999, Branson relinquished his interest in 2001 and the London Broncos brand was 'retired' in September 2005, becoming Harlequins Rugby League under the ownership of Ian Lenagan.

== Sources ==
- ABC Radio
- A history of State High Rugby
