= Kerry Carmichael =

Australian rugby league footballer

Personal information
- Full name: Kerry Carmichael

Playing information
- Position: Five-eighth
Club
Years	Team	Pld	T	G	FG	P
1996–97	South Queensland	15	3	0	0	12
- Source: As of 23 November 2023

Kerry Carmichael is an Australian former professional rugby league footballer who played in the 1990s. He played for South Queensland in the ARL competition.

== Playing career ==
Carmichael made his first grade debut for South Queensland in round 10 of the 1996 ARL season against Newcastle at Marathon Stadium. He played a total of 13 games in 1996 as South Queensland finished with the Wooden Spoon. In 1997, Carmichael only played twice for South Queensland as they finished with another wooden spoon. Following the conclusion of the season in 1997, South Queensland were liquidated as Carmichael never played first grade again. In 1998, Carmichael played for Norths in the Queensland Cup and was part of their premiership winning team that season.

== Coaching career ==
In 2010, Carmichael was head coach of the Norths Devils and took them to the 2010 Queensland Cup Grand Final. In 2017, Carmichael coached the Dalby Diehards to their first premiership in the Toowoomba District Rugby League competition.
