= Nigel Gaffey =

Australian rugby league footballer

Personal information
- Full name: Nigel Roy Gaffey
- Born: 5 January 1970 (age 56) Canberra, Australian Capital Territory, Australia

Playing information
- Position: Lock, Second-row, Centre
Club
Years	Team	Pld	T	G	FG	P
1989–91	Canberra Raiders	23	3	0	0	12
1992–95	Eastern Suburbs Roosters	79	23	1	0	94
1996	South Queensland Crushers	20	4	0	0	16
1997–98	Sydney City Roosters	34	6	0	0	24
1999–00	Penrith Panthers	24	1	0	0	4
	Total	180	37	1	0	150
Representative
Years	Team	Pld	T	G	FG	P
1993	Country Origin	1	0	0	0	0

Nigel Gaffey (born 5 January 1970) is an Australian former rugby league footballer who played in the 1990s and 2000s. He played at club level for the Canberra Raiders, the Sydney City Roosters, the South Queensland Crushers and the Penrith Panthers, as a second-row and lock. He is the son of former Cronulla Sharks player Len Gaffey.

== Playing career ==
A Canberra junior, Gaffey made his first grade debut for the Raiders as a replacement in their 22-16 loss against the Cronulla Sharks at Seiffert Oval in round 16 of the 1989 season. Gaffey replaced the injured Bradley Clyde in the Raiders' victory over the Penrith Panthers in the 1990 Grand Final. Gaffey's stint with Raiders ended at the conclusion of the 1991 season.

Gaffey joined the Eastern Suburbs Roosters in 1992, and in what was a season that produced mixed fortunes for the Roosters, Gaffey starred, playing in all 22 games, and scored 8 tries and finished the season as the team's equal top try scorer along with fellow Roosters 1992 newcomers Gary Freeman and David Seidenkamp. Gaffey also starred in the Roosters' 1993 season campaign, he once again played in all 22 games, and scored 9 tries and finished the season as the team's top try scorer on his own. In addition, Gaffey was also selected in the Country Origin side in the 1993 City vs Country Origin match. After a few poor seasons in 1994 and 1995 in which the Roosters finished 14th and 9th respectively, Gaffey decided to leave the Roosters at the end of the 1995 season.

In 1996, along with fellow Roosters Jason Hudson, Graham Mackay, Clinton O'Brien and Mark Protheroe, Gaffey joined the ill-fated South Queensland Crushers. Despite playing in 20 of their 21 games in 1996, The Crushers finished with the wooden spoon. Gaffey left the Crushers at the end of the 1996 season. In 1997, Gaffey returned to the Roosters. In his second stint with the Roosters, they were much more of a dominant force in the competition. They went from being easybeats (having not made a finals appearance since 1987) to title contenders. In 1997 and 1998, they went within one game of making their first grand final appearance since 1980, losing both preliminary finals to the Manly Sea Eagles and the Brisbane Broncos respectively. Gaffey left the Roosters at the end of the 1998 season.

In 1999, Gaffey joined the Penrith Panthers. Gaffey played in the first 8 games of the 2000 season before announcing his retirement. He finished his career playing 177 games, and scoring 37 tries, and 1 goal.
