= Brett Plowman =

Australian rugby league footballer

Personal information
- Full name: Brett Plowman
- Born: 13 June 1969 (age 57)

Playing information
- Position: Wing, Second-row, Centre
Club
Years	Team	Pld	T	G	FG	P
1988–93	Brisbane Broncos	53	17	0	0	68
1994–95	Parramatta Eels	23	5	0	0	20
1996–97	Gold Coast	27	3	0	0	12
	Total	103	25	0	0	100
- Relatives: Lachlan Maranta (son)

Brett Plowman (born 13 June 1969) is an Australian former rugby league footballer who played in the 1980s and the 1990s.

== Playing career ==
Plowman began his footballing journey with the Millmerran Rams in south Queensland before signing with the Brisbane Broncos for the club’s inaugural season in the New South Wales Rugby League in 1988, along with his brother Darren.

Plowman made his first-grade debut that same year in round 9 against the Eastern Suburbs Roosters; Plowman lined up in the centres alongside Gene Miles in a 24-20 victory in front of 16,000 people at Lang Park.

Plowman would go on to play 53 games for the Broncos over six seasons, however he missed out on being a part of their first two premierships in 1992 and 1993 with international three-quarters Michael Hancock, Willie Carne, Steve Renouf and Chris Johns in the squads.

Plowman moved to Sydney in 1994 after signing a two-year contract with the Parramatta Eels, with whom he played 23 games, mainly partnering up on the wing with speedster Lee Oudenryn.

He returned to Queensland for the 1996 and 1997 seasons, where he played 27 games for the ill-fated Gold Coast Chargers, mainly coming off the bench. His final season of first-grade saw his first taste of finals football, with a 25-14 victory over the Paul McGregor-led Illawarra Steelers, followed by a 32-10 loss to the Brad Fittler-captained Sydney City Roosters in the major qualifying final.

Plowman is the father of Lachlan Maranta who, like Plowman, also played on the wing for the Brisbane Broncos.
