= Valentine-Eleebana Red Devils =

Australian rugby league club, based in Lake Macquarie, NSW

Valentine Eleebana Red Devils
Club information
- Full name: Valentine Eleebana Junior Rugby League Football Club
- Colours: Red, White
- Founded: 1970; 56 years ago
- Website: http://www.valodevils.com.au

Current details
- Ground: Croudace Bay Sports Complex, Croudace Bay NSW

The Valentine-Eleebana Red Devils are a junior rugby league club based in Lake Macquarie, NSW. They were formed in 1970, and have become a feeder club for Lakes United in the Newcastle Rugby League and the Newcastle Knights in the National Rugby League.

== Notable Rugby League Alumni ==
- (Australia) Paul Harragon
- (Australia) Brett Kimmorley
- (Australia) Michael Ennis
- (Australia) Adam Muir
- (Australia) Luke Burt
- (Australia) Brett Finch
- (United States) Clint Newton
- (Australia) Willie Mason
- (Australia) Josh Perry
- (Australia) Sam Stone
- (Australia) Jack Hetherington
- (Australia) Grant Anderson
- (Australia) Jonah Pezet
- (Australia) Anthony Quinn
