= Jason Wendt =

Australian rugby league footballer

Personal information
- Full name: Jason Wendt
- Born: 27 June 1974 (age 52)

Playing information
- Position: Wing
Club
Years	Team	Pld	T	G	FG	P
1996–97	South Queensland	22	5	0	0	20
- Source: As of 8 December 2023

Jason Wendt is an Australian former professional rugby league footballer who played in the 1990s. He played for South Queensland in the ARL competition.

== Playing career ==
Wendt made his first grade debut for South Queensland in round 10 of the 1996 ARL season against Newcastle at Marathon Stadium. Wendt played a total of twelve games for the club and scored four tries as they finished with the Wooden Spoon. The following year, Wendt played ten games as South Queensland finished with another wooden spoon. Following the conclusion of the 1997 ARL season, South Queensland were liquidated and Wendt never played first grade rugby league again.
