= Troy Pezet =

Australian rugby league footballer

Personal information
- Full name: Troy Pezet
- Born: 24 April 1974 (age 51) Gosford, New South Wales, Australia
- Height: 173 cm (5 ft 8 in)
- Weight: 78 kg (12 st 4 lb)

Playing information
- Position: Halfback
Club
Years	Team	Pld	T	G	FG	P
1996–97	South Qld Crushers	19	6	5	0	34
1998	Parramatta Eels	9	1	0	0	4
	Total	28	7	5	0	38
- Relatives: Jonah Pezet (son)

Troy Pezet (born 24 April 1974) is an Australian former professional rugby league footballer who played as a halfback for the Parramatta Eels and the South Queensland Crushers in the 1990s.

== Playing career ==
Pezet started his first grade career at the now-defunct South Queensland club.

Pezet was a member of the South Queensland teams, which finished last on the table in 1996 and 1997. He was also a member of the final-ever game the Crushers played, a 39–18 victory over the Western Suburbs Magpies, before they were denied a place in the new National Rugby League competition in 1998 following the Super League war.

In 1998, Pezet moved to Parramatta where he spent one season before retiring at the end of the year at the age of 24.

== Post playing ==
Pezet is currently working for the Newcastle Knights as their elite pathways recruitment manager. His son, Jonah Pezet, has played for the Melbourne Storm since 2023.
