= Darren Plowman =

Australian rugby league footballer

Playing information
- Position: Wing
Club
Years	Team	Pld	T	G	FG	P
1992–93	Brisbane Broncos	2	0	0	0	0
1995–96	South Qld Crushers	20	6	0	0	24
	Total	22	6	0	0	24

Darren Plowman is an Australian former professional rugby league footballer who played for the Brisbane Broncos and the South Queensland Crushers.

A winger, Plowman was a member of Brisbane's 1990 reserves premiership side and made his way into the first-grade team in 1992. He didn't feature regularly in first-grade and finished up the Broncos in 1993 with only two appearances, one in each season. His brother Brett was a teammate at the Broncos.

Plowman was acquired from the Broncos by the South Queensland Crushers for the club's inaugural season in 1995. He debuted for the Crushers in round three and made 19 appearances in total that season. In round 10 he scored a career best two tries, to help South Queensland upset the top of the table Newcastle Knights, who were previously unbeaten.
