= David Seidenkamp =

Australian rugby league footballer

Personal information
- Born: 15 January 1970 (age 56) Sydney, New South Wales, Australia
- Height: 173 cm (5 ft 8 in)
- Weight: 86 kg (13 st 8 lb)

Playing information
- Position: Fullback, Wing
Club
Years	Team	Pld	T	G	FG	P
1990–91	Canterbury Bulldogs	2	1	0	0	4
1992–94	Eastern Suburbs	30	11	0	0	44
1995	Western Suburbs	1	0	0	0	0
	Total	33	12	0	0	48

David Seidenkamp (/ˈsaɪdənkæmp/) (born 15 January 1970) is an Australian former rugby league footballer who played as a fullback and occasionally on the wing in the 1990s. His club career was with the Canterbury-Bankstown Bulldogs, Eastern Suburbs Roosters and the Western Suburbs Magpies.

== Playing career ==
Seidenkamp was graded by the Canterbury-Bankstown Bulldogs in 1989. He made his first-grade debut from the bench in his side's 12−6 loss against the North Sydney Bears at Belmore Sports Ground in round 14 of the 1990 season. His only other first-grade appearance for Canterbury was also from the bench: a 19-12 loss to South Sydney at the Sydney Football Stadium in round 5 of the 1991 season; however, Seidenkamp also played in the Bulldogs' 1991 President's Cup grand final victory over the Western Suburbs Magpies. Seidenkamp's stint with Canterbury ended at the conclusion of the 1991 season.

Seidenkamp joined the Eastern Suburbs Roosters in 1992, and in what was a season that produced mixed fortunes for the Roosters, Seidenkamp starred, playing in 17 of their 22 games, and scoring eight tries to finish the year as the team's equal top try-scorer along with fellow Roosters 1992 newcomers Gary Freeman and Nigel Gaffey. Seidenkamp scored a hat-trick in his side's 56−16 thumping of the South Sydney Rabbitohs in the final round of the 1992 season. Seidenkamp's stint with the Roosters ended at the conclusion of the 1994 season.

In 1995, Seidenkamp joined the Western Suburbs Magpies. His lone first-grade appearance for the Magpies came in the club’s 32−16 defeat to the North Sydney Bears at North Sydney Oval in round 21. With injuries plaguing his career, Seidenkamp prematurely retired at the end of the 1995 season at the age of 25. He finished his career having played 33 games, and scoring 12 tries.
