= Paul Morgan (rugby league, died 2001) =

Australian rugby league footballer, administrator and businessman

Personal information
- Born: c1947
- Died: 26 January 2001 (aged 54); Brisbane, Queensland

Playing information
Club
| Years | Team | Pld | T | G | FG | P |
|---|---|---|---|---|---|---|
| | Toowoomba Clydesdales |
| | Redcliffe Dolphins |
| | Total | 0 | 0 | 0 | 0 | 0 |

Paul "Porky" Morgan (died 26 January 2001) was an Australian rugby league footballer, administrator and businessman. He is remembered for being co-founder of the Brisbane Broncos club and one of the architects of Super League/ The Paul Morgan Medal for the Brisbane Broncos' best and fairest player of the season is named after him.

== Footballer ==
Morgan attended Brisbane State High School where he was a pupil of former Queensland Maroons captain, Cyril Connell, Jr. Morgan represented Queensland in rugby league in his first year out of school and went on to play for the Bulimba Cup-winning Toowoomba team of 1970 alongside Wayne Bennett. He later played in Brisbane for Redcliffe and was their goal kicker.

== Business ==
Morgan was a leading stockbroker in Brisbane, establishing his own firm. He helped raise funds for the films Crocodile Dundee and Les Patterson Saves the World.

== Administrator ==
In 1986 Paul Morgan joined Barry Maranta, Gary Balkin and Steve Williams to form a Brisbane-based club for the New South Wales Rugby League premiership, Australia's top rugby league club competition at the time. All men had played for Brisbane domestic teams. Four organisations made bids for the team which would be established in 1987. Ron McAuliffe, had the support of the NSWRL over the Maranta-Morgan group, other groups included 'International Syndicate' led by John Sattler and Bob Hagan, and one by Darryl van der Velde (who would later be CEO of the South Queensland Crushers).

The NSWRL decided not to have a Brisbane club in 1987 but in a final bid for the 1988 season, both McAuliffe and Maranta-Morgan bid for the club. The NSWRL finally decided to have a Brisbane-based team and thus the Brisbane Broncos were born. The rights originally were going to go to the McAuliffe based group, but when it was realised they didn't have the funds to support the club, it was given to Maranta-Morgan.

However the Maranta-Morgan group did not please everybody, especially Australian Rugby League chairman Ken Arthurson, who decided to add other (now defunct) Queensland-based teams, Gold Coast in 1988 and South Queensland in 1995.

Morgan was in charge of Pacific Sports Entertainment, the company that owns the Brisbane Broncos.

Morgan suggested the concept of Super League at a Brisbane Broncos board meeting in 1993.

== Death ==
Paul Morgan died of a heart attack while playing golf at the Royal Queensland Golf Club Course in Brisbane. He was 54. He left a widow, Suellen Morgan.

The day after his death the Brisbane Broncos played against St Helens R.F.C. in England for the 2001 World Club Challenge wearing black arm-bands in honour of Morgan, and the Broncos' player of the year award was named after him. Paul Morgan's son, Lachlan Morgan played for the Toowoomba Clydesdales in the 2006 Queensland Cup grand final.
