= Jarrod Wallace =

Australian rugby league footballer

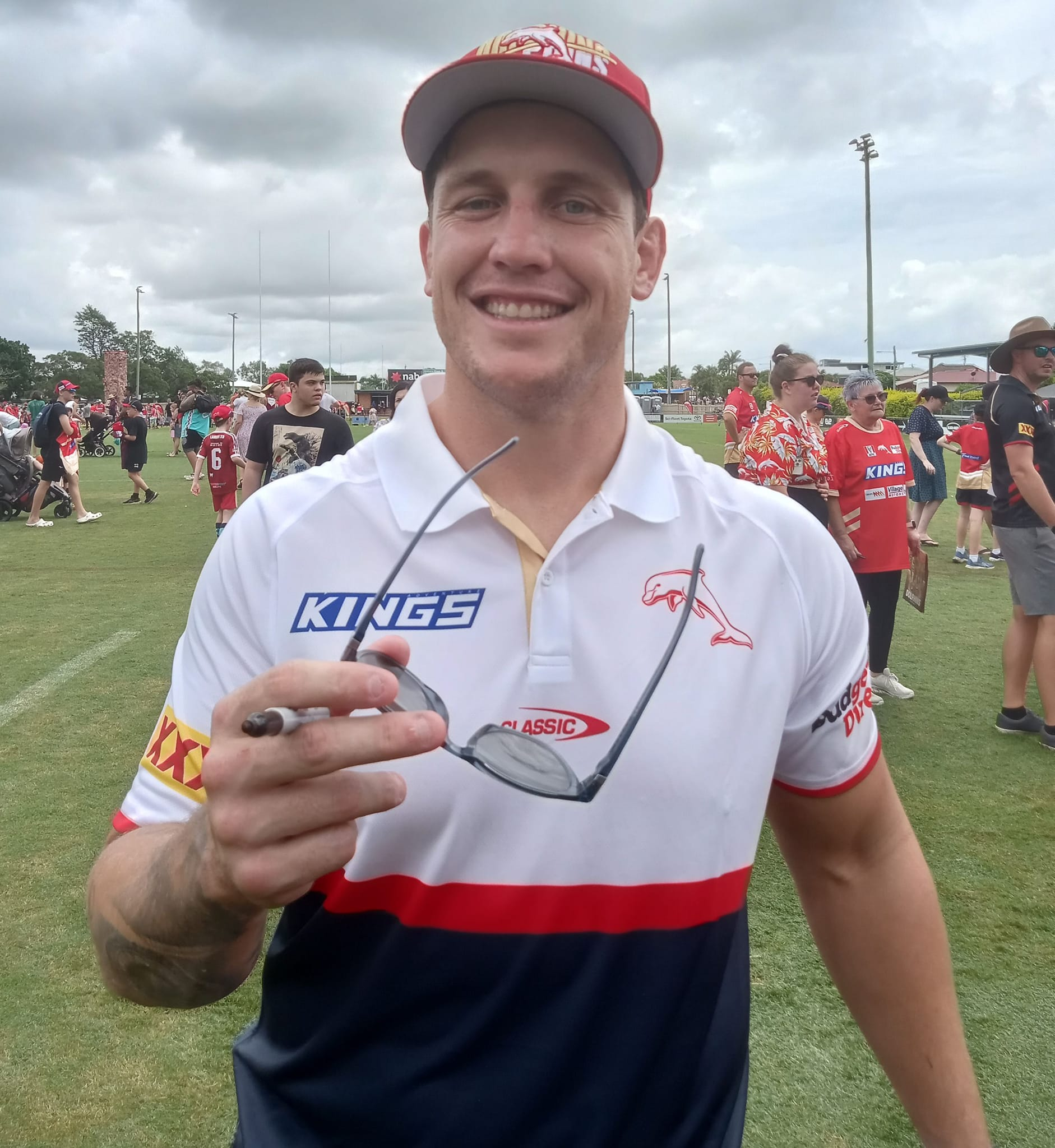

Personal information
- Born: 23 July 1991 (age 35) Gold Coast, Queensland, Australia
- Height: 188 cm (6 ft 2 in)
- Weight: 111 kg (17 st 7 lb)

Playing information
- Position: Prop
Club
Years	Team	Pld	T	G	FG	P
2012–16	Brisbane Broncos	73	5	0	0	20
2017–22	Gold Coast Titans	118	15	0	0	60
2023–24	Dolphins	21	4	0	0	16
2024	Catalans Dragons	7	2	0	0	8
	Total	219	26	0	0	104
Representative
Years	Team	Pld	T	G	FG	P
2012	Queensland Residents	1	0	0	0	0
2017–19	Queensland	6	1	0	0	4
- Source: As of 21 Jul 2024
- Spouse: Courtney Thorpe (m. 2019; sep. 2021)

Jarrod Wallace (born 23 July 1991) is an Australian professional former rugby league player who last played as a prop for the Catalans Dragons in the English Super League.

He has previously played for the Dolphins, the Gold Coast Titans and the Brisbane Broncos in the National Rugby League, and for Queensland in the State of Origin series. Currently plays for the Dalby Diehards

== Early life ==
Wallace was born and raised on the Gold Coast, Queensland, Australia. He played his first junior rugby league for the Runaway Bay Seagulls at age four.

At age thirteen, Wallace moved to Coffs Harbour, New South Wales, where his father played local rugby league. While there, Wallace played junior rugby league with the Sawtell Panthers before signing with the Gold Coast Titans at age sixteen and moving back to Queensland.

== Early career (2010-2011) ==
Wallace played for the Gold Coast Titans' Mal Meninga Cup side and, later, seventeen games for their NYC side in 2010. He signed with the Brisbane Broncos for the 2011 season and spent the entire season playing for the club's NYC side.

== First grade career ==
=== Brisbane Broncos (2012–2016) ===
Wallace was elevated into the Broncos' first-grade squad and played in two pre-season trials. He started the 2012 season playing for the Broncos' feeder side the Norths Devils in the Intrust Super Cup. He was named in the 2012 Queensland Residents side to take on their New South Wales counterparts in the curtain raiser to game 3 of the 2012 State of Origin series at Suncorp Stadium. On 10 June 2012, Wallace made his National Rugby League debut in Brisbane's 40–22 round 14 win against the Sydney Roosters at Allianz Stadium.

In 2013, Wallace played mostly for the Norths Devils, and a total of six games for the Brisbane club in the NRL. Wallace played a total of fourteen games for Brisbane in 2014.

Due to shoulder surgery, Wallace did not play until round 2 in 2015. In round 4 against the New Zealand Warriors Wallace scored his first NRL try. In round 6, Wallace was placed on report for a chicken wing tackle and was suspended for a week. In round 19 against the Wests Tigers, he scored his second career try following a short pass from Adam Blair. In round 20 against the Gold Coast Titans, one day after his 24th birthday, Wallace scored his third NRL try. In rounds 21 and 22, he started at prop due to Blair being suspended. For the remainder of the season, Wallace played off the bench including the 2015 NRL Grand Final loss to the North Queensland Cowboys. In 2015, Wallace played in a total of twenty-five games and scored three tries for the Brisbane club.

In January 2016, Wallace was selected in the QAS emerging Maroons squad. On 5 February, he was one of eight players from the Maroons emerging camp banned from representing Queensland for twelve months after breaking a curfew in Brisbane. Wallace finished 2016 after playing in all twenty-six games and scoring two tries for the Brisbane Broncos.

=== Gold Coast Titans (2017–2022) ===
Wallace made his debut for the Gold Coast Titans in round 1 of the 2017 NRL season in a 32–18 loss to the Sydney Roosters at Cbus Super Stadium. For game 1 of the 2017 State of Origin series, Wallace was selected as 18th man for Queensland. For games 2 and 3 of the series, he was selected in both games as a starting prop. In the third game, Wallace scored a sealing try for Queensland against New South Wales.

In round 5 of the 2018 NRL season, Wallace scored his first NRL try for the Gold Coast in their 32–20 win over the Manly Warringah Sea Eagles at Marley Brown Oval. In round 8 against the Cronulla-Sutherland Sharks, he played his 100th NRL game.

Wallace played twenty-one games for the Gold Coast in the 2019 NRL season as the club endured a horror year on and off the field finishing last on the table.

Wallace played seventeen games for the Gold Coast in the 2020 NRL season as the club finished ninth on the table and missed out on the finals.

In round 25 of the 2021 NRL season, Wallace was sin-binned for involvement in a scuffle after running in to defend a teammate during the Gold Coast's 44–0 victory over the New Zealand Warriors. Wallace played twenty-five games for the Gold Coast in the season, including the club's elimination-final loss against the Sydney Roosters.

Wallace played twelve matches and scored three tries for the Gold Coast in the 2022 NRL season.

=== Dolphins (2023-24) ===
On 8 June 2022, Wallace signed a two-year deal to join the newly licensed Dolphins club in the following year. In round 1 of the 2023 NRL season, Wallace made his club debut for the Dolphins in their inaugural game in the national competition, defeating the Sydney Roosters 28–18 at Suncorp Stadium. In round 4, he scored a try against the Brisbane Broncos at Suncorp in the inaugural "Battle for Brisbane" derby match. In round 8, Wallace scored a try in the Dolphins 28–26 victory over the Gold Coast Titans at Suncorp Stadium.

=== Catalans Dragons (2024-24) ===
On 21 Jul 2024, it was reported that he had signed for Catalans Dragons in the Super League until the end of the 2024 season.

Boxing

Wallace fought Nelson Asofa-Solomona as part of the Battle of the Reef event on 7 October 2023 where he lost 2:37 in to round number 2. It was Wallace’s second fight an first loss, having won his fight win against Former fringe Melbourne Storm forward Nick timm via round 4 TKO.

Retirement

On 27 October 2024, Wallace announced his retirement from professional rugby league after 13 seasons.

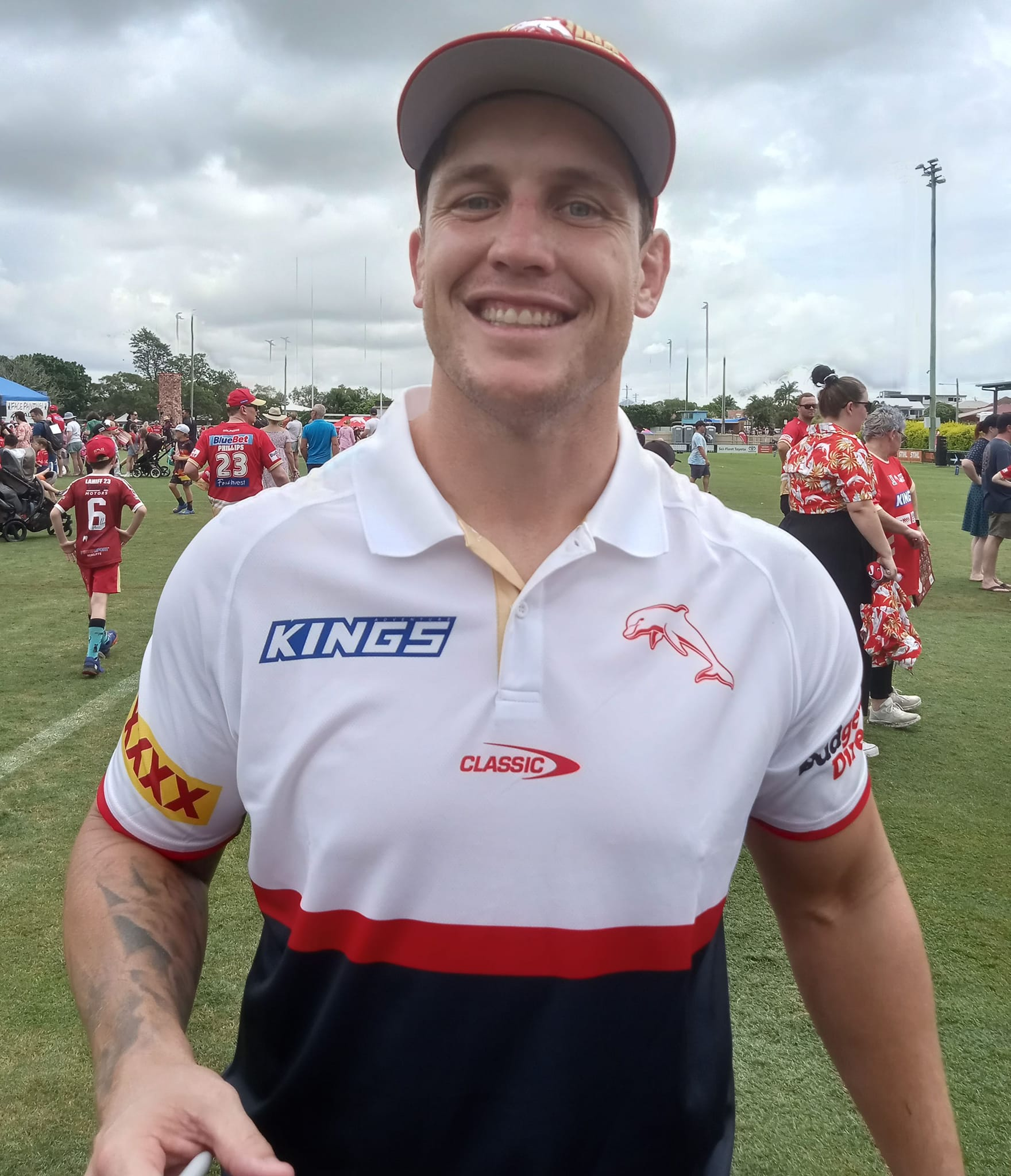
Wallace in Brisbane

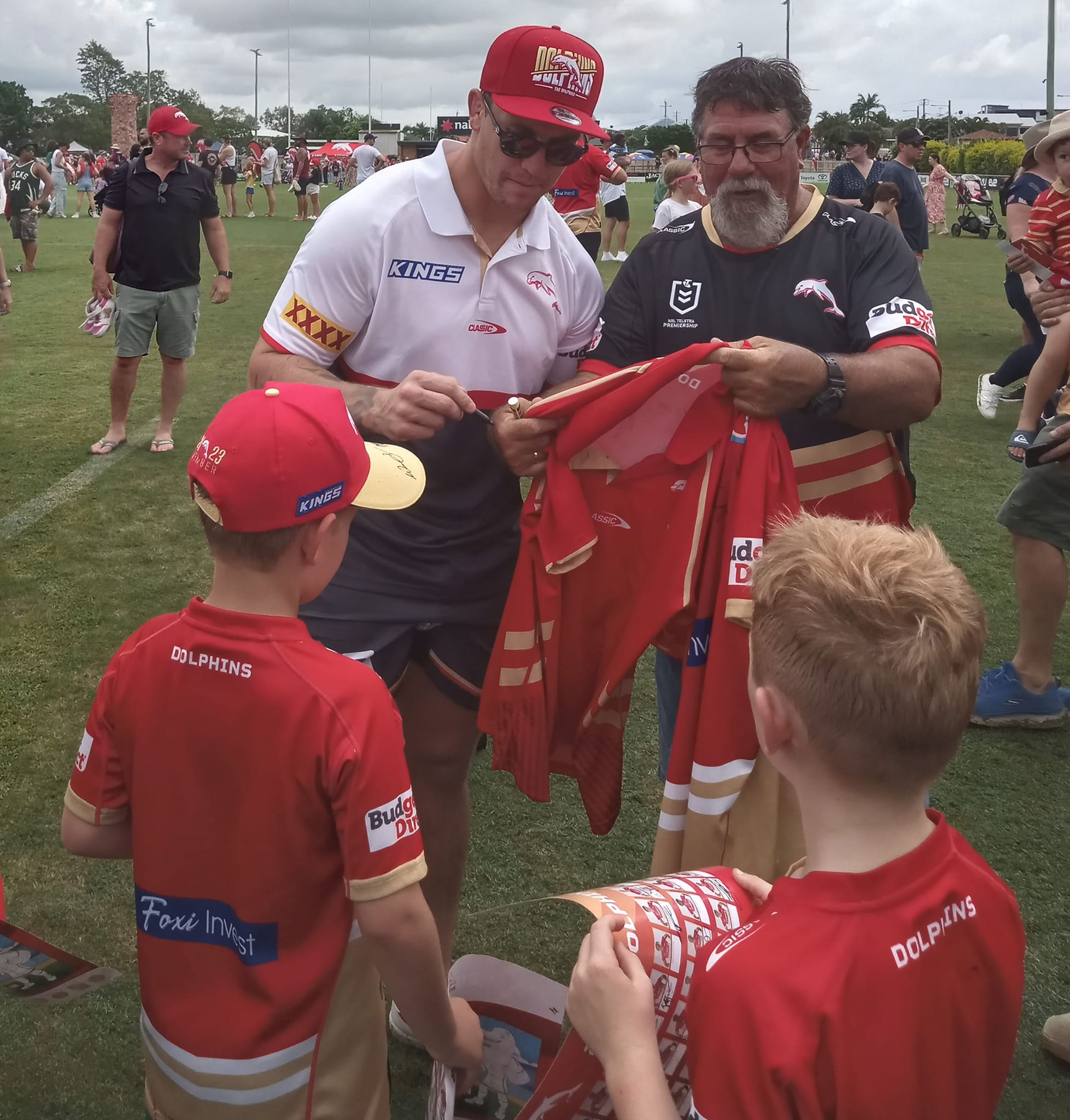
Wallace in sunglasses

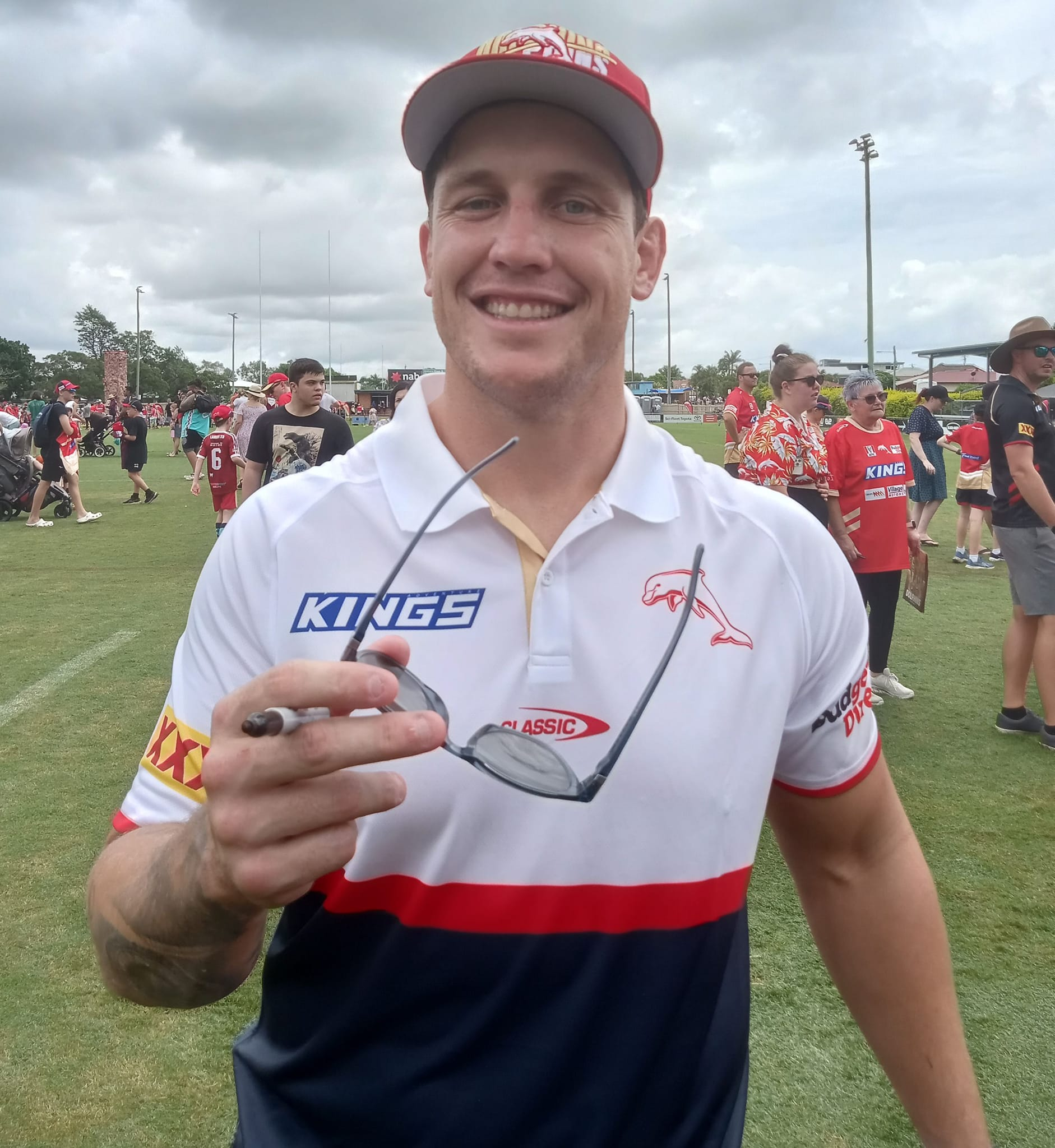
Wallace in 2024

== Statistics ==
Season	Team	Matches	T	G	GK %	F/G	Pts
2012	Brisbane Broncos	2	—	—	—	—	—
2013	Brisbane Broncos	6	—	—	—	—	—
2014	Brisbane Broncos	14	—	—	—	—	—
2015	Brisbane Broncos	25	3	—	—	—	12
2016	Brisbane Broncos	26	2	—	—	—	8
2017	Gold Coast Titans	21	—	—	—	—	—
2018	Gold Coast Titans	20	3	—	—	—	12
2019	Gold Coast Titans	21	2	—	—	—	8
2020	Gold Coast Titans	17	1	—	—	—	4
2021	Gold Coast Titans	25	6	—	—	—	24
2022	Gold Coast Titans	14	3	—	—	—	12
2023	Dolphins	19	3	—	—	—	12
2024	Dolphins	2	1				4
2024	Catalans Dragons	7	2	0	0	0	8
Career totals		216	26	0	—	0	104

== Personal life ==
Wallace has two daughters, born in 2012 and 2014, with a former partner. In early 2019, he married Miss World Australia 2014 winner Courtney Thorpe, who gave birth to Wallace's third daughter in August 2019. Wallace and Thorpe reportedly separated in September 2021.
