= Terry Cook (rugby league, born 1965) =

Australian rugby league footballer

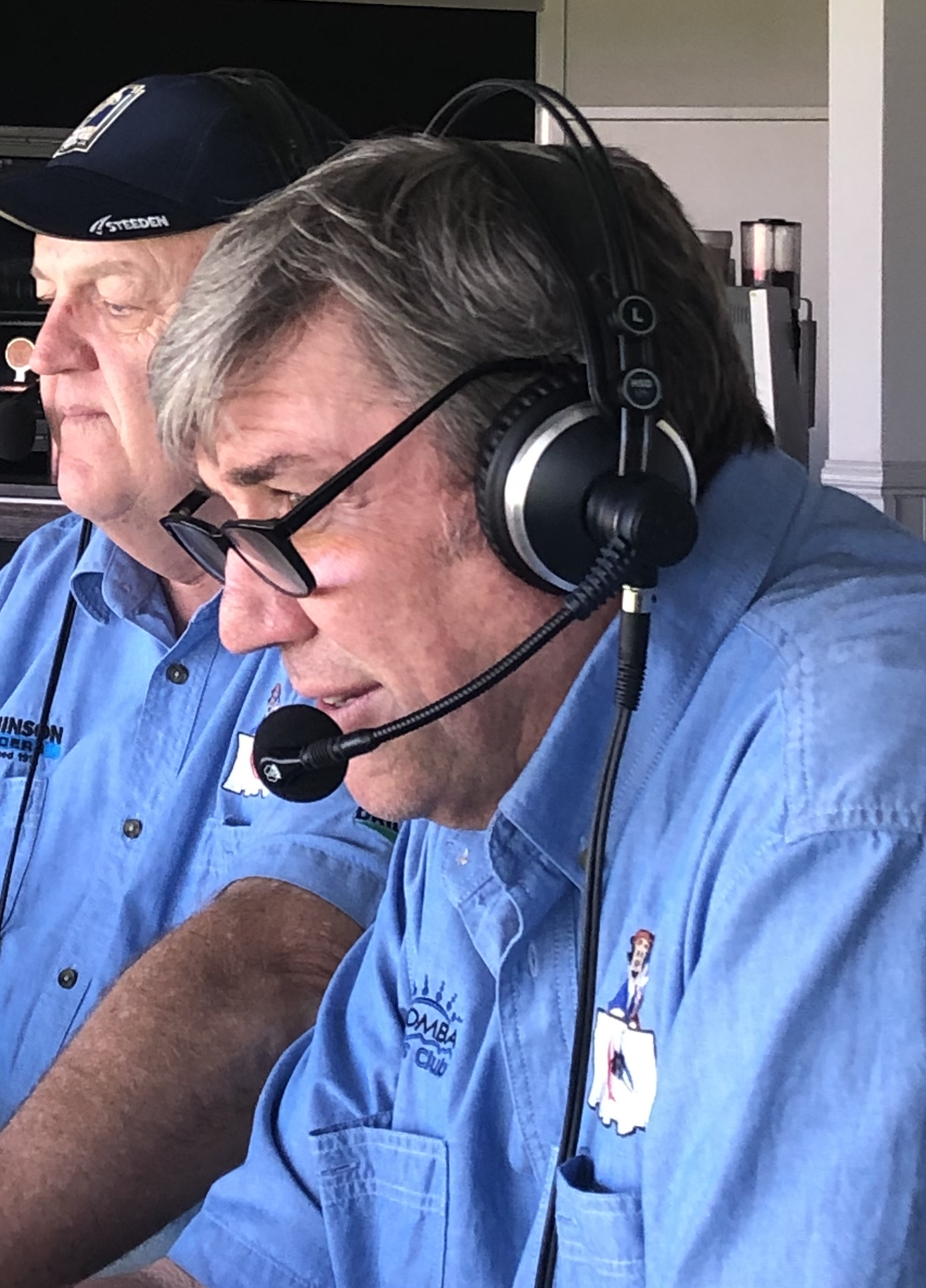

Personal information
- Full name: Terry Cook
- Born: 29 October 1965 (age 61)

Playing information
- Position: Centre, Lock, Second-row
Club
Years	Team	Pld	T	G	FG	P
1991–94	Gold Coast Seagulls	56	5	0	0	20
1995–96	South Qld Crushers	25	3	0	0	15
	Total	81	8	0	0	35
Representative
Years	Team	Pld	T	G	FG	P
1995	Queensland	3	0	0	0	0
- Source: As of 1 February 2019

Terry Cook is an Australian former professional rugby league footballer who played as a centre, lock and second-row forward in the 1990s.

He played for the Gold Coast Seagulls and South Queensland Crushers in the NRL, and represented Queensland in 1995.

== Playing career ==
Cook made his first-grade debut for the Gold Coast in Round 2, 1991, losing 26-8 to the Manly-Warringah Sea Eagles. Cook spent four years at the Gold Coast, during which time the club finished last in 1991, 1992 and 1993.

In 1995, Cook joined the newly-admitted South Queensland side and also represented the Queensland team that unexpectedly won the State of Origin series against New South Wales 3-0. Prior to the series beginning, sections of the media had labelled the Queenslanders “Fatty’s Nevilles”, the nickname given to the team under inexperienced coach Paul “Fatty” Vautin with the side of “Neville Nobodies” seen as no chance of even winning a game, let alone taking the shield.

Cook played one further season with South Queensland before departing the club at the end of 1996, with the Crushers finishing in last place.

Cook then went on to play with the Norths Devils in the Queensland Cup in 1997, and in 2010 was still playing C-Grade rugby league for Pittsworth at the age of 44.

== Post playing ==
In 2016, Cook became a commentator for the Toowoomba Rugby League show on radio station Power FM. He is part of the OBee and Cookie Call team. He also owns and operates the Jondaryan Hotel.
