= Lachlan Maranta =

Australian professional rugby player

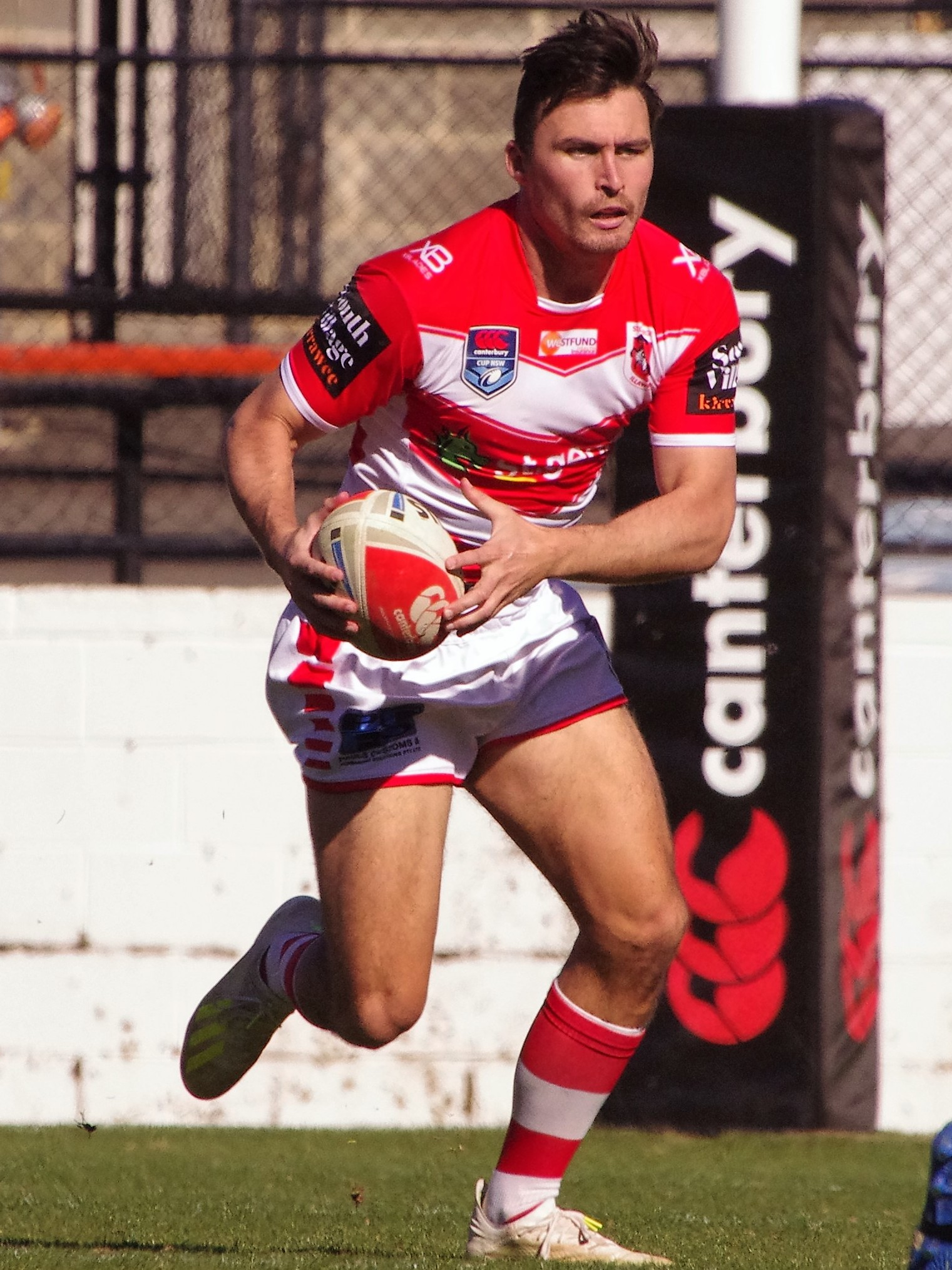

Personal information
- Born: 17 April 1992 (age 34) Brisbane, Queensland, Australia
- Height: 187 cm (6 ft 2 in)
- Weight: 93 kg (14 st 9 lb)

Playing information

Rugby league
- Position: Wing, Fullback
Club
Years	Team	Pld	T	G	FG	P
2012–16	Brisbane Broncos	70	30	0	0	120
2019	St. George Illawarra	2	0	0	0	0
	Total	72	30	0	0	120

Rugby union
Club
Years	Team	Pld	T	G	FG	P
2017–18	Queensland Reds	3	0	0	0	0
- Source: As of 17 August 2019
- Education: St Joseph's College, Gregory Terrace
- Father: Brett Plowman
- Relatives: Barry Maranta (grandfather)

Lachlan Maranta (born 17 April 1992) is a professional Rugby league footballer who plays on the wing for the Wynnum Manly Seagulls in the Queensland Cup.

He previously played for the Brisbane Broncos in the National Rugby League.

Maranta played rugby union for the Queensland Reds in Super Rugby.

== Background ==
Maranta was born in Brisbane, Queensland, Australia.

Maranta grew up surrounded by rugby league. His grandfather, Barry Maranta, was a Brisbane Broncos co-founder, his father, Brett Plowman, played six seasons for the team and his mother, Robyn, was an assistant to then-Broncos coach Wayne Bennett. A Broncos ball boy at the age of five, Maranta started playing rugby league for the Wests Panthers. Lachlan attended St Joseph's College, Gregory Terrace where he achieved numerous sporting honours. Apart from rugby union, Maranta was also a talented cricketer and exceptional track-and-field athlete while growing up, but made the choice to follow his rugby league dream when he was 16. Maranta represented Queensland under-16s, under-18s and Queensland Schoolboys during his teenage years.

== Early career ==
Maranta joined the Broncos' Toyota Cup team in 2010 and played 30 games for them between 2010 and 2011. Despite still being eligible for the Toyota Cup in 2012, Maranta started playing for the Norths Devils in the Queensland Cup.

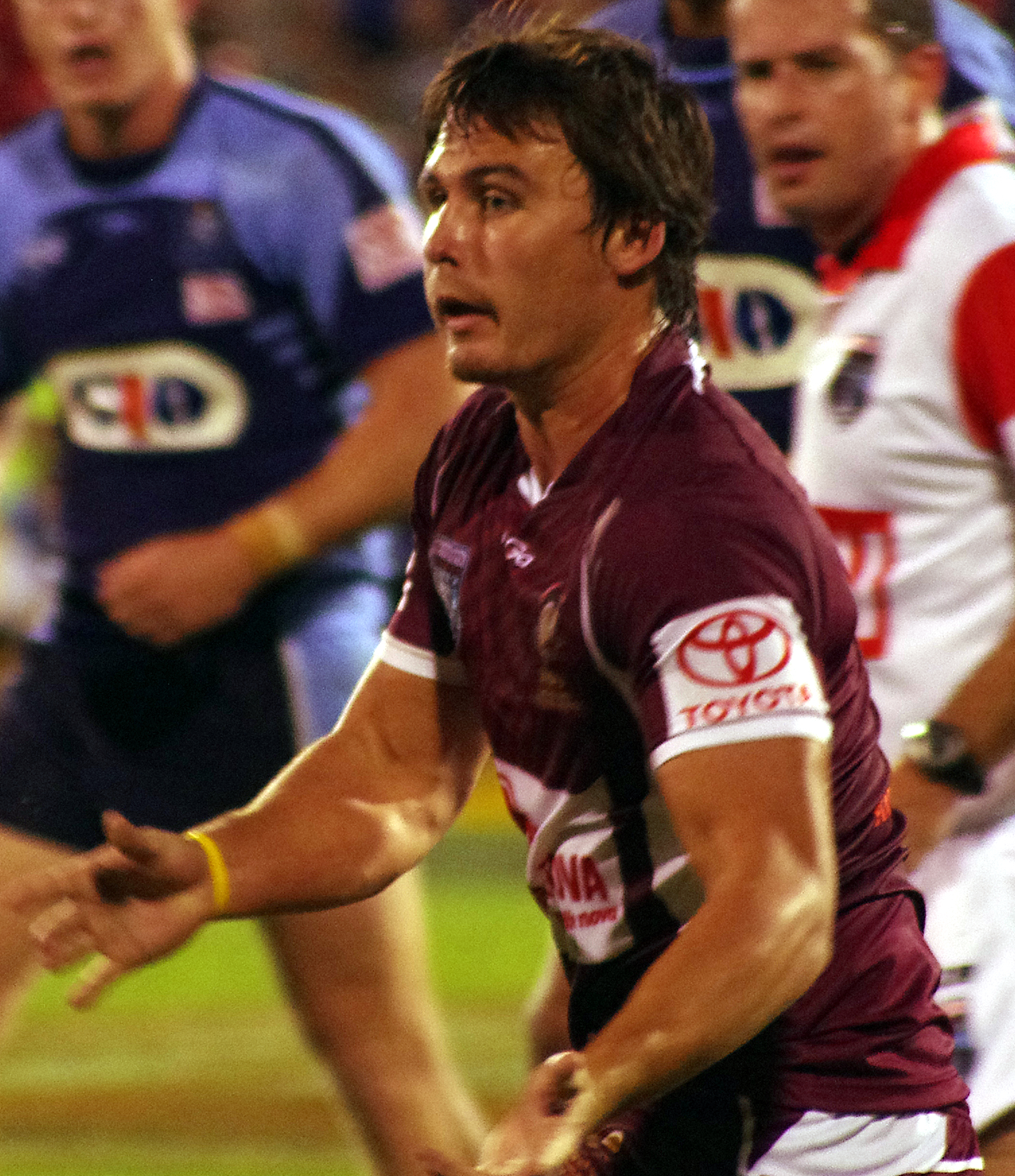
Maranta playing for the Queensland Under-20s in 2012

While playing for the Devils, Maranta was called up to play fullback for Queensland against New South Wales in the inaugural under-20s State of Origin match at Penrith Stadium in the Maroons' 18–14 loss.

== Playing career ==
=== 2012 ===
In Round 14 of the 2012 NRL season, Maranta made his NRL debut for the Brisbane Broncos against the Sydney Roosters on the wing, scoring a try and making two line breaks in the 40–22 win at SFS. In June 2012, Maranta was named at fullback in the Queensland Residents side against New South Wales Residents in a 20–14 win. Maranta finished the 2012 NRL season by being named the Brisbane Broncos’ Rookie of the Year after playing in seven matches and scoring two tries his debut year in the NRL.

=== 2013 ===
Maranta finished the 2013 NRL season having played in 18 matches and scoring five tries for the Broncos.

=== 2014 ===
On 30 May, Maranta re-signed with the Broncos to the end of the 2016 season. He finished the 2014 NRL season with five tries from 17 matches.

=== 2015 ===
On 21 January 2015, Maranta was named in the Brisbane Broncos' 2015 Auckland Nines squad. In Round 19 against the Wests Tigers, he scored a hat-trick in the Broncos' 42–16 win at Suncorp Stadium. He finished the 2015 season as the Broncos' highest try-scorer with 15 tries in 20 matches. On 15 December, Maranta was named on the interchange bench for the World All Stars to play against the Indigenous All Stars in the 2016 pre-season.

=== 2016 ===
On 19 January, Maranta suffered a massive setback before the season after he fractured a bone in his wrist at training, robbing him of his selection in the 2016 All Stars match. He was expected to miss about 10–12 weeks of football but made an early return in Round 4 in the grand final rematch against the North Queensland Cowboys, which ended with a 21-20 golden-point victory to the Broncos. After the match, Maranta was relegated to playing in the Queensland Cup for the Norths Devils but succumbed to a knee injury and was ruled out for eight weeks. Maranta returned for the Broncos for the second time in Round 12 against the Wests Tigers, scoring a try in a 19–18 loss. Maranta finished his last season with the Broncos by playing in eight matches and scoring three tries.

In August, Maranta signed a two-year deal with the Queensland Reds in the Super Rugby, following the lead of former Broncos wingers Willie Carne, Wendell Sailor and Lote Tuquiri in switching over to the 15-man code he had played during his high school years. After the signing was announced, Maranta was subjected to criticism by former Wallabies player Greg Martin, saying, "If Wayne Bennett is prepared to get rid of his godson and his former PA’s son and Brett Plowman’s son in Lachie Maranta. If he’s prepared to get rid of him, that would indicate that he’s a crap player. The Reds immediately snapped him up and crowed about it. That is the worst signing I’ve ever seen."

=== 2019 ===
On 13 December 2018, Maranta signed a contract to join St. George-Illawarra for the 2019 season. He made his debut for the Dragons in round 14 against Manly-Warringah at Brookvale Oval. Maranta made one further appearance for the first team during the 2019 NRL season but spent the majority of the year playing for the club's reserve-grade side which won the minor premiership in the Canterbury Cup. In November 2019, it was announced that Maranta had been released by St George-Illawarra. It was reported on 26 November that Maranta had signed with Queensland Cup team Wynnum-Manly Seagulls for the 2020 season, marking his return to Queensland.
