= John Jones (rugby league) =

Australian rugby league footballer

Personal information
- Born: 9 January 1966 (age 60) Sydney, New South Wales, Australia

Playing information
- Position: Second-row, Prop
Club
Years	Team	Pld	T	G	FG	P
1989–94	Manly Sea Eagles	85	15	0	0	60
1995–97	South Qld Crushers	24	1	0	0	4
	Total	109	16	0	0	64

John Jones (born on 9 January 1966) is an Australian former professional rugby league footballer who played in the 1980s and 1990s. He played for the Manly-Warringah Sea Eagles and South Queensland Crushers, and primarily played second-row forward.

== Playing career ==
When he was a local junior, Jones had to bide his time in reserve grade; he eventually made his first grade debut at the age of 23 for the Manly-Warringah Sea Eagles in their 19−14 loss to the Cronulla-Sutherland Sharks in round 15 of the 1989 NSWRL season.

In 1990 under the coaching of Manly's new coach Graham Lowe, Jones become a regular in the Sea Eagles first grade team, playing 23 games and forming part of a hard working back row with Test representative forward Ian Roberts and Manly's 1987 Premiership winning and former Test halfback now converted to lock forward, Des Hasler. 1991 was an injury hit season saw him only playing 17 games for the Sea Eagles, though he was part of Manly's run to 2nd in the Minor Premiership before bowing out in the Major Semi Final against defending premiers Canberra. In the 1992 season, after playing in all 22 games and scoring 4 tries, Jones finished runner-up to Allan Langer in the Rothmans Medal for best and fairest player during the Winfield Cup competition that season. After playing 20 games for the Sea Eagles in 1993 under returning coach, Manly legend Bob Fulton, more injuries disrupted his 1994 season which actually saw him play just one First Grade Game. Jones departed from Manly at the end of the 1994 season.

In 1995, John Jones moved north to Brisbane to join the newly formed South Queensland Crushers on a three-year deal. Following the demise of the Crushers at the end of the 1997 season, Jones decided to retire from playing. He finished his career having played 109 games and scoring 16 tries. Jones played in the Crusher's last ever game in the top grade, which ended in a 39-18 victory over Western Suburbs in round 22.
