= Jason Hudson (rugby league) =

Australian rugby league footballer

Personal information
- Full name: Jason Hudson
- Born: 4 March 1973 (age 52); Cronulla, New South Wales, Australia

Playing information
- Position: Wing
Club
Years	Team	Pld	T	G	FG	P
1993	Cronulla-Sutherland	5	0	0	0	0
1994–95	Eastern Suburbs	37	7	5	0	38
1996–97	South Queensland	39	11	7	0	50
1998	Gold Coast Chargers	17	4	0	0	16
	Total	98	22	12	0	104

Jason Hudson is an Australian former professional rugby league footballer who played in the 1990s. He played for Cronulla-Sutherland Sharks, Eastern Suburbs, the South Queensland Crushers and the Gold Coast Chargers, as a wing.

== Playing career ==
Hudson began his first grade career for Cronulla in 1993 making his debut in Round 3 against local rivals St George. Hudson made 5 appearances that season before signing with Eastern Suburbs. Hudson spent two seasons at Eastern Suburbs and was a regular in the team but left at the end of 1995 to join the newly admitted South Queensland side. Hudson spent two unsuccessful seasons with South Queensland as they finished last with back to back wooden spoons. Hudson featured in the club's last ever game which was a 39–18 victory over the Western Suburbs Magpies.

After the liquidation of South Queensland, Hudson signed for the Gold Coast Chargers. Hudson was also a member of The Chargers last ever game as a first grade side which was a 20–18 loss to Cronulla. The Gold Coast club later became one of the victims during the rationalization of the competition. Hudson then went on to play the 1999 season with Balmain Tigers but made no first grade appearances for the club. Hudson then played his final season in 2000 with the new Wests Tigers following the merger but made no top grade appearances. Hudson retired at the start of pre-season training for the 2001 season due to injury.
