= South Queensland Crushers =

Defunct Australian rugby league club, based in Brisbane, QLD

South Queensland

Club information
- Full name: South Queensland Crushers; Rugby League Football Club
- Nickname: The Crushers
- Colours: Aztec Gold; Navy blue Red
- Founded: 30 November 1992; 33 years ago (first season 1995)
- Exited: 1997; 29 years ago

Former details
- Ground: Lang Park (52,500)
- Competition: Australian Rugby League; Brisbane Rugby League
- Team colours

Records
- Premierships: 0
- Runners-up: 0
- Minor premierships: 0
- Wooden spoons: 2 (1996, 1997 ^{(ARL)})

The South Queensland Crushers were an Australian rugby league football club based in Brisbane, Queensland. In 1992 it was decided that the team would be admitted into the New South Wales Rugby League competition, along with three other teams, as part of the League's expansion plans for professional rugby league in Australia. The competition was re-branded the Australian Rugby League competition in 1995, which was the Crushers' first season.

The South Queensland Crushers, whose whole existence was against the backdrop of the Super League war, were a club that would be unsuccessful. They had to compete for support with the other Brisbane-based club, the Brisbane Broncos, who were already well-established. The Crushers only competed in the three seasons of the Australian Rugby League's premiership, winning the wooden spoon twice for being last in the competition. Despite the wealth of star players the Crushers managed to attract, they were financially unsustainable and competitively unsuccessful, which ultimately led to their demise at the end of 1997.

== History ==
=== Formation ===
The New South Wales Rugby League competition (NSWRL) began in 1908 as a rugby league competition in the Sydney region of Australia. For the next 74 years, the league only included clubs in the New South Wales region. In 1982, the Canberra Raiders from the Australian Capital Territory, and in 1988, the two Queensland based teams, one each from Brisbane and from Gold Coast were admitted into the NSWRL. The Brisbane club was the first NSWRL club to be privately owned and in 1992 won their first premiership. On 30 November 1992, the NSWRL formally admitted a second Brisbane-based team into the competition, along with three others, from Townsville, Perth and Auckland. The newly established Brisbane team was to be known as the South Queensland Crushers, and would enter the 1995 NSWRL competition, which had been renamed the Australian Rugby League competition (ARL).

In September 1993, the Crushers chose Bill Gardner as the coach for the team, but after a poor off-season, he was replaced by former Australian international Bob Lindner. Darryl van der Velde, a former Brisbane player with experience coaching in England, was the club's inaugural chief executive. The club chose Lang Park, which had been abandoned by the Brisbane Broncos in favour of QE II Stadium in 1992, as their home ground.

The Crushers signed Queensland representative players Trevor Gillmeister, Mark Hohn and Dale Shearer, as well as three rugby union international players, Garrick Morgan, Anthony Herbert and Fili Seru. The Crushers also attempted to lure former Australian international captain Mal Meninga out of retirement for one more season, but failed. By the beginning of the 1995 competition, the Crushers had also signed North Sydney forward Mario Fenech, who the club named as their captain. The club's major sponsor was XXXX with Qantas announced as the sleeve sponsor.

The club competed in the Brisbane Rugby League premiership in 1994 and 1995 to prepare for entry into the ARL.

=== 1995 season – The first season ===
The Crushers' first match was against the previous season's premiers, Canberra which they lost along with their next three before winning their first match 16–12 against North Sydney in Round five. Trevor Gillmeister had the honour of scoring the Crusher's first ever try. An injury to Dale Shearer and the difficulties for Garrick Morgan to adapt to rugby league saw the Crushers fail to utilise much of its attacking potential. Captain Fenech was dropped to the interchange bench and lost the captaincy which was passed on to Gillmeister. The season's end was dampened after coach Lindner and Fenech feuded, resulting in Fenech being released from the final year of his contract.

In the 1995 season, the club had only won six and drew another in the twenty-two games played. In 1995, News Limited, a mass media company, began deliberating a rival rugby league competition, the Super League, and with the rival Broncos a key part of the plans for Super League, the Crushers remained loyal to the ARL competition. The Crushers believed that they would survive and be able to compete on their own. The ARL supported this despite the disappointing results of their first season because of the high home ground crowds, with supporters averaging over 21,000 a season.

Round	Home	Score	Away	Date	Venue	Crowd
1	South Queensland Crushers	6–24	Canberra Raiders	11 March 1995	Lang Park	21,102
2	Parramatta Eels	26–2	South Queensland Crushers	18 March 1995	Parramatta Stadium	8,080
3	Penrith Panthers	34–12	South Queensland Crushers	26 March 1995	Penrith Stadium	8,024
4	Brisbane Broncos	32–0	South Queensland Crushers	31 March 1995	QE II Stadium	49,607
5	South Queensland Crushers	16–12	North Sydney Bears	9 April 1995	Lang Park	19,233
6	Manly Sea Eagles	38–10	South Queensland Crushers	16 April 1995	Brookvale Oval	10,616
7	South Queensland Crushers	24–24	Illawarra Steelers	23 April 1995	Lang Park	16,253
8	South Queensland Crushers	33–14	Parramatta Eels	30 April 1995	Lang Park	19,421
9	Sydney City Roosters	17–6	South Queensland Crushers	7 May 1995	Sydney Football Stadium	5,556
10	South Queensland Crushers	28–18	Newcastle Knights	21 May 1995	Lang Park	21,072
11	South Queensland Crushers	4–20	Cronulla-Sutherland Sharks	4 June 1995	Lang Park	22,258
12	Sydney Tigers	16–12	South Queensland Crushers	17 June 1995	Parramatta Stadium	3,225
13	South Queensland Crushers	28–8	Penrith Panthers	25 June 1995	Lang Park	19,753
14	Western Suburbs Magpies	38–14	South Queensland Crushers	1 July 1995	Campbelltown Stadium	4,707
15	South Queensland Crushers	20–24	South Sydney Rabbitohs	9 July 1995	Lang Park	19,288
16	Gold Coast Seagulls	8–14	South Queensland Crushers	15 July 1995	Seagulls Stadium	6,731
17	South Queensland Crushers	10–22	Auckland Warriors	23 July 1995	Lang Park	28,928
18	Western Reds	22–14	South Queensland Crushers	28 July 1995	WACA	9,103
19	South Queensland Crushers	22–6	North Queensland Cowboys	6 August 1995	Lang Park	17,105
20	St. George Dragons	16–6	South Queensland Crushers	13 August 1995	Kogarah Oval	9,091
21	South Queensland Crushers	18–25	Sydney Bulldogs	20 August 1995	Lang Park	26,904
22	Canberra Raiders	58–4	South Queensland Crushers	27 August 1995	Bruce Stadium	19,107

=== 1996 season – The second season ===
The club had bought five players from the Sydney Roosters to help them improve from their inaugural season, and Queensland representative Tony Hearn also joined the club for the 1996 season. The opening round of the 1996 season the club gathered two points because of Canberra's forfeit but the club only recorded three more wins in the entire season gathering six points on the competition ladder and took the wooden spoon for being last on the ladder. The Crushers won the second round clash against Parramatta before losing ten in a row. The Crushers then won two in a row before plummeting to lose their last eight matches.

Despite a record crowd of 34,263 that watched the Crushers take on the Brisbane Broncos in round 4, the Crushers home ground support only averaged over 13,000 each game. The diminishing crowd numbers and player payments meant the club was on the brink of bankruptcy. The ARL and a mystery supporter bailed the club out with over half a million dollars in financial relief. With first-grade rugby league divided between two competitions, it would be hard for the Crushers to recoup lost money in establishing the club as it ploughed further into debt.

A glimmer of hope for the club came when the Crushers won the Under 21's premiership, defeating the Parramatta Eels in the Under 21's Grand Final. This was to be the only premiership of any competition or grade for the Crushers.

Round	Home	Score	Away	Date	Venue	Crowd
1	Canberra Raiders	forfeit	South Queensland Crushers			
2	South Queensland Crushers	24–20	Parramatta Eels	29 March 1996	Lang Park	12,704
3	South Queensland Crushers	4–22	Penrith Panthers	7 April 1996	Lang Park	11,694
4	South Queensland Crushers	8–28	Brisbane Broncos	12 April 1996	Lang Park	34,263
5	North Sydney Bears	18–4	South Queensland Crushers	21 April 1996	North Sydney Oval	7,871
6	South Queensland Crushers	6–14	Manly Sea Eagles	28 April 1996	Lang Park	15,202
7	Illawarra Steelers	18–14	South Queensland Crushers	5 May 1996	Wollongong Stadium	4,883
8	Parramatta Eels	14–4	South Queensland Crushers	11 May 1996	Parramatta Stadium	9,621
9	South Queensland Crushers	12–38	Sydney City Roosters	25 May 1996	Lang Park	10,107
10	Newcastle Knights	22–6	South Queensland Crushers	9 June 1996	Marathon Stadium	17,559
11	Cronulla-Sutherland Sharks	28–4	South Queensland Crushers	15 June 1996	Shark Park	7,071
12	South Queensland Crushers	2–12	Sydney Tigers	22 June 1996	Lang Park	10,166
13	Penrith Panthers	16–20	South Queensland Crushers	30 June 1996	Penrith Stadium	4,215
14	South Queensland Crushers	24–22	Western Suburbs Magpies	7 July 1996	Lang Park	8,961
15	South Sydney Rabbitohs	48–16	South Queensland Crushers	14 July 1996	Redfern Oval	3,107
16	South Queensland Crushers	4–52	Gold Coast Chargers	21 July 1996	Lang Park	8,776
17	Auckland Warriors	16–12	South Queensland Crushers	28 July 1996	Mt Smart Stadium	17,000
18	South Queensland Crushers	16–18	Western Reds	4 August 1996	Lang Park	7,789
19	North Queensland Cowboys	11–6	South Queensland Crushers	9 August 1996	Stockland Stadium	24,989
20	South Queensland Crushers	8–26	St. George Dragons	18 August 1996	Lang Park	9,567
21	Canterbury Bulldogs	17–16	South Queensland Crushers	25 August 1996	Belmore Oval	5,025
22	South Queensland Crushers	10–36	Canberra Raiders	1 September 1996	Lang Park	13,945

=== 1997 season – The third and final season ===
The 1997 season was not much better for the Crushers, again taking the wooden spoon for the second year running. Major sponsor XXXX was replaced as the major sponsor by AVJennings. The club only won four games of the twenty-two match season. The 1997 season for the Crushers saw their home game attendances dwindle to an average of 7,000 and even with free days, which allowed supporters to come to the games free of charge, the club didn't gather support as it had in its inaugural season. The Crushers did however win their final match of the season convincingly 39–18 over the Western Suburbs Magpies and along with the North Sydney Bears and Newtown Jets, the South Queensland Crushers remain one of the few defunct clubs to have won their final game.

Round	Home	Score	Away	Date	Venue	Crowd
1	Sydney City Roosters	34–10	South Queensland Crushers	9 March 1997	Sydney Football Stadium	8,475
2	South Queensland Crushers	23–6	Parramatta Eels	16 March 1997	Lang Park	9,523
3	Newcastle Knights	44–0	South Queensland Crushers	23 March 1997	Marathon Stadium	15,114
4	South Queensland Crushers	16–36	Manly Sea Eagles	29 March 1997	Lang Park	9,147
5	Illawarra Steelers	14–6	South Queensland Crushers	6 April 1997	WIN Stadium	6,144
6	South Queensland Crushers	14–22	Gold Coast Chargers	13 April 1997	Lang Park	5,290
7	South Sydney Rabbitohs	24–20	South Queensland Crushers	20 April 1997	Sydney Football Stadium	4,353
8	South Queensland Crushers	16–18	Balmain Tigers	25 April 1997	Lang Park	5,998
9	St. George Dragons	32–22	South Queensland Crushers	4 May 1997	Kogarah Oval	5,003
10	South Queensland Crushers	22–36	North Sydney Bears	10 May 1997	Lang Park	5,447
11	Western Suburbs Magpies	32–12	South Queensland Crushers	18 May 1997	Campbelltown Stadium	5,732
12	South Queensland Crushers	28–14	Sydney City Roosters	23 May 1997	Lang Park	5,518
13	Parramatta Eels	52–10	South Queensland Crushers	8 June 1997	Parramatta Stadium	10,009
14	South Queensland Crushers	6–24	Newcastle Knights	28 June 1997	Lang Park	4,769
15	Manly Sea Eagles	46–12	South Queensland Crushers	6 July 1997	Brookvale Oval	5,055
16	South Queensland Crushers	8–34	Illawarra Steelers	19 July 1997	Lang Park	2,364
17	Gold Coast Chargers	40–18	South Queensland Crushers	27 July 1997	Carrara Stadium	8,392
18	South Queensland Crushers	17–16	South Sydney Rabbitohs	3 August 1997	Lang Park	3,545
19	Balmain Tigers	32–14	South Queensland Crushers	10 August 1997	Leichhardt Oval	5,101
20	South Queensland Crushers	0–14	St. George Dragons	17 August 1997	Lang Park	13,845
21	North Sydney Bears	42–8	South Queensland Crushers	24 August 1997	North Sydney Oval	7,308
22	South Queensland Crushers	39–18	Western Suburbs Magpies	31 August 1997	Lang Park	11,588

=== Demise ===
With the unification of the Australian Rugby League and Super League competitions following the 1997 season, the new National Rugby League competition was formed. This meant that three of the twenty-two teams participating in 1997 would be axed as part of the rationalisation process aimed at reducing teams to an optimal number. With the introduction of the Melbourne Storm and the fact that the agreement between the Australian Rugby League and Super League was to have a fourteen-team competition in 2000, the future for the Crushers was inevitably demise.

In late 1997, the club's only option of survival was to merge, with the most likely contender the Gold Coast Chargers, who like the Crushers, were struggling to be able to compete in the competition with the hugely successful Brisbane Broncos being the dominant team in south-east Queensland. However, the National Rugby League approved the Gold Coast team for the 1998 season, and they went alone into the re-unified competition. The South Queensland Crushers were liquidated in December 1997 with debts totalling over A$3 million.

== Season summaries ==
Season	Pld	W	D	L	PF	PA	PD	W%	Position
Australian Rugby League season 1995	22	6	1	15	303	502	-199	27.27%	16/20
Australian Rugby League season 1996	21	3	0	18	220	496	-276	14.29%	20/20
Australian Rugby League season 1997	22	4	0	18	321	630	-309	18.18%	12/12
Total	65	13	1	51	844	1628	-784	20%	

== Notable players ==
Over their three-year presence in the Australian Rugby League premiership, the club managed to produce one Australian international player, Trevor Gillmeister.

Other notable players include Dale Shearer, Mark Hohn, Craig Teevan, Mario Fenech, William David Gressly, Nigel Gaffey, John Jones, Tony Kemp, Phillip Lee, Danny Nutley, Mark Protheroe and Kurt Wrigley. Players who went on to be successful with other clubs include Clinton Schifcofske, Mark Tookey, Scott Sattler, Travis Norton, Chris McKenna, St John Ellis, Steele Retchless and Danny Nutley, Grant Young.

== Club Song ==
The South Queensland Crushers' club was called "Gonna Crush Ya!"

(First verse)
There's a voice in me, deep down inside
It's the voice of hope and Northern pride
'cos a Queensland son's gonna hear his name
When it comes to the city for the greatest game
When it comes to the city for the greatest game

(First Chorus)
Gonna crush ya,
Put the big ones in
Gonna crush ya,
And we'll never give in
Gonna crush ya,
Like a mean steam train
Queensland Crushers' gonna crush ya like cane

(Second Verse)
There's a force from the North, can you feel the power?
For the time has come, and we're close to the hour
The crowd fired up, can you hear them say?
We're the Queensland Crushers, and we're coming your way
We're the Queensland Crushers, and we're here to stay

(First Chorus)
Gonna crush ya,
Put the big ones in
Gonna crush ya,
And we'll never give in
Gonna crush ya,
Like a mean steam train
Queensland Crushers' gonna crush ya like cane

(Second Chorus)
We're gonna crush ya,
We're Queensland Crushers
We're gonna crush ya,
We're Queensland Crushers
We're gonna crush ya,
Like a mean steam train
Queensland Crushers' gonna crush ya like cane

(First Chorus)
Gonna crush ya,
Put the big ones in
Gonna crush ya,
And we'll never give in
Gonna crush ya,
Like a mean steam train
Queensland Crushers' gonna crush ya like cane

(Second Chorus)
We're gonna crush ya,
We're Queensland Crushers
We're gonna crush ya,
We're Queensland Crushers
We're gonna crush ya,
Like a mean steam train
Queensland Crushers' gonna crush ya like cane

(Home Run) We're gonna crush ya

== Records ==
Club records from 1995 to 1997.

=== Premierships ===
- 1st Grade: 0
- 2nd Grade: 0
- 3rd Grade/Presidents Cup: 1 (1996)
- Pre Season: 0

=== Biggest wins ===
Margin	Score	Opponent	Venue	Date
21	39–18	Western Suburbs Magpies	Lang Park	31 August 1997
20	28–8	Penrith Panthers	Lang Park	25 June 1995
19	33–14	Parramatta Eels	Lang Park	30 April 1995

=== Biggest losses ===
Margin	Score	Opponent	Venue	Date
54	4–58	Canberra Raiders	Bruce Stadium	25 August 1995
48	4–52	Gold Coast Chargers	Lang Park	21 July 1996
44	0–44	Newcastle Knights	Marathon Stadium	23 March 1997

=== Most games for club ===
- 58 Craig Teevan (1995–1997)

=== Most points for club ===
- 108 (7 tries, 40 goals), Clinton Schifcofske (1996–1997)

=== Most tries for club ===
- 11, Jason Hudson (1996–1997)

=== Most goals for club ===
- 40, Clinton Schifcofske (1996–1997)

=== Most points in a season ===
- 94 (6 tries, 35 goals), Clinton Schifcofske in 1997

=== Most tries in a season ===
- 9, David Krause in 1995
- 9, Jason Hudson in 1997

=== Most goals in a season ===
- 35 (35/67 – 61.40%), Clinton Schifcofske in 1997

=== Longest winning streak ===
2 matches, 30 June – 7 July 1996.

=== Longest losing streak ===
10 matches, 7 April – 22 June 1996.

=== Largest attendance (home) ===
34,263 vs Brisbane Broncos, Round 4, 1996

=== Smallest attendance (home) ===
2,364 vs Illawarra Steelers, Round 16, 1997

=== Largest attendance (away) ===
49,607 vs Brisbane Broncos at ANZ Stadium, Round 4, 1995

=== Smallest attendance (away) ===
3,107 vs South Sydney Rabbitohs at Redfern Oval, Round 15, 1996
