= List of New South Wales rugby league team squads =

This article shows the players that have played in the New South Wales State of Origin team in the history of the Rugby League State of Origin series.

== 1980 Game ==
Position	1980 ^{a}
Fullback	Graham Eadie
Wing	Chris Anderson
Centre	Mick Cronin
Centre	Steve Rogers
Wing	Greg Brentnall
Five-Eighth	Alan Thompson
Halfback	Tom Raudonikis (c)
Prop	Gary Hambly
Hooker	Steve Edge
Prop	Craig Young
Second Row	Bob Cooper
Second Row	Graeme Wynn
Lock	Jim Leis
Replacement	Steve Martin
Replacement	Robert Stone

== 1981 Game ==
Position	1981 ^{a}
Fullback	Phil Sigsworth
Wing	Terry Fahey
Centre	Mick Cronin
Centre	Steve Rogers (c)
Wing	Eric Grothe, Sr.
Five-Eighth	Terry Lamb
Halfback	Peter Sterling
Prop	Steve Bowden
Hooker	Barry Jensen
Prop	Ron Hilditch
Second Row	Peter Tunks
Second Row	Les Boyd
Lock	Ray Price
Replacement	Garry Dowling
Replacement	Graeme O'Grady

== 1982 Series ==
Position	Game 1	Game 2	Game 3
Fullback	Greg Brentnall		Phil Sigsworth
Wing	Chris Anderson	Ziggy Niszczot	Phillip Duke
Centre	Mick Cronin	Steve Rogers	Brad Izzard
Centre	Steve Rogers	Brad Izzard	Mick Cronin
Wing	Ziggy Niszczot	Tony Melrose	Terry Fahey
Five-Eighth	Alan Thompson		Brett Kenny
Halfback	Steve Mortimer		
Prop	John Coveney		Don McKinnon
Hooker	Max Krilich (c)		
Prop	Craig Young		Royce Ayliffe
Second Row	Tony Rampling	John Muggleton	Paul Merlo
Second Row	John Muggleton	Tony Rampling	Les Boyd
Lock	Ray Price		
Replacement	Brad Izzard	Brett Kenny	Alan Thompson
Replacement	Royce Ayliffe		Craig Young

== 1983 Series ==
Position	Game 1	Game 2	Game 3
Fullback	Greg Brentnall	Marty Gurr	
Wing	Chris Anderson	Neil Hunt	
Centre	Phil Sigsworth	Mick Cronin	
Centre	Brett Kenny	Steve Ella	
Wing	Eric Grothe, Sr.		Chris Anderson
Five-Eighth	Alan Thompson	Brett Kenny	
Halfback	Peter Sterling		Steve Mortimer
Prop	Geoff Gerard		Geoff Bugden
Hooker	Max Krilich (c)	Ray Brown	Max Krilich (c)
Prop	Geoff Bugden	Lindsay Johnston	
Second Row	Les Boyd	Gavin Miller	Stan Jurd
Second Row	Wayne Pearce	Paul Field	
Lock	Ray Price	Ray Price (c)	Gavin Miller
Replacement	Steve Ella	Steve Mortimer	Kevin Hastings
Replacement	Ray Brown	Stan Jurd	Ray Brown

== 1984 Series ==
Position	Game 1	Game 2	Game 3
Fullback	Garry Jack		
Wing	Eric Grothe, Sr.		Steve Morris
Centre	Steve Ella	Andrew Farrar	Chris Mortimer
Centre	Brett Kenny	Brian Johnston	
Wing	Ross Conlon		
Five-Eighth	Alan Thompson	Terry Lamb	Brett Kenny
Halfback	Peter Sterling	Steve Mortimer	Steve Mortimer (c)
Prop	Steve Roach		
Hooker	Rex Wright	Royce Simmons	
Prop	Craig Young	Peter Tunks	Pat Jarvis
Second Row	Noel Cleal		
Second Row	Wayne Pearce		Chris Walsh
Lock	Ray Price (c)		Peter Wynn
Replacement	Brian Hetherington	Steve Ella	Mick Potter
Replacement	Pat Jarvis		Peter Tunks

== 1985 Series ==
Position	Game 1	Game 2	Game 3
Fullback	Garry Jack		
Wing	Eric Grothe, Sr.		
Centre	Michael O'Connor		
Centre	Chris Mortimer		
Wing	John Ferguson		
Five-Eighth	Brett Kenny		
Halfback	Steve Mortimer (c)		Des Hasler
Prop	Steve Roach		
Hooker	Ben Elias		
Prop	Pat Jarvis		
Second Row	Noel Cleal		David Brooks
Second Row	Peter Wynn		
Lock	Wayne Pearce		Wayne Pearce (c)
Replacement	Steve Ella		
Replacement	Peter Tunks		Tony Rampling

== 1986 Series ==
Position	Game 1	Game 2	Game 3
Fullback	Garry Jack		
Wing	Steve Morris	Brian Hetherington	Brian Johnston
Centre	Michael O'Connor		
Centre	Chris Mortimer		
Wing	Andrew Farrar		Eric Grothe, Sr.
Five-Eighth	Brett Kenny		
Halfback	Peter Sterling		
Prop	Steve Roach		
Hooker	Royce Simmons		
Prop	Peter Tunks		
Second Row	Steve Folkes		
Second Row	Noel Cleal		
Lock	Wayne Pearce (c)		
Replacement	Terry Lamb		
Replacement	David Gillespie		

== 1987 Series ==
Position	Game 1	Game 2	Game 3	Game 4^{b}
Fullback	Garry Jack			Jonathan Docking
Wing	Michael O'Connor		Brian Johnston	
Centre	Mark McGaw		Brett Kenny	Mark McGaw
Centre	Brian Johnston		Michael O'Connor	
Wing	Andrew Ettingshausen	Andrew Farrar	Andrew Ettingshausen	
Five-Eighth	Brett Kenny		Cliff Lyons	
Halfback	Peter Sterling			Peter Sterling (c)
Prop	Les Davidson	David Boyle	Peter Tunks	
Hooker	Royce Simmons			
Prop	Pat Jarvis		Phil Daley	
Second Row	Steve Folkes		David Boyle	Noel Cleal
Second Row	Noel Cleal	Les Davidson		
Lock	Wayne Pearce (c)			Paul Langmack
Replacement	Des Hasler		Mark McGaw	Des Hasler
Replacement	David Boyle	Paul Langmack	Steve Folkes	David Boyle

== 1988 Series ==
Position	Game 1	Game 2	Game 3
Fullback	Jonathan Docking	Garry Jack	
Wing	Brian Johnston	John Ferguson	
Centre	Mark McGaw		
Centre	Michael O'Connor		
Wing	Andrew Ettingshausen		
Five-Eighth	Cliff Lyons	Terry Lamb	Cliff Lyons
Halfback	Peter Sterling		Des Hasler
Prop	Les Davidson	Phil Daley	Steve Hanson
Hooker	Royce Simmons	Ben Elias	
Prop	Steve Roach		
Second Row	Noel Cleal	Wayne Pearce (c)	
Second Row	Steve Folkes		
Lock	Wayne Pearce (c)	Paul Langmack	
Replacement	Terry Lamb	Des Hasler	Greg Florimo
Replacement	David Trewhella	Paul Dunn	Noel Cleal

== 1989 Series ==
Position	Game 1	Game 2	Game 3
Fullback	Garry Jack		
Wing	John Ferguson		
Centre	Andrew Farrar	Andrew Ettingshausen	Brian Johnston
Centre	Laurie Daley		Chris Johns
Wing	Chris Johns		Michael O'Connor
Five-Eighth	Terry Lamb	Chris Mortimer	Des Hasler
Halfback	Des Hasler	Greg Alexander	
Prop	Paul Dunn		Bruce McGuire
Hooker	Mario Fenech		David Trewhella
Prop	John Cartwright	Peter Kelly	
Second Row	Gavin Miller (c)		
Second Row	Paul Sironen	Bruce McGuire	Mark Geyer
Lock	Bradley Clyde		Brad Mackay
Replacement	Andrew Ettingshausen	Brad Mackay	Terry Matterson
Replacement	Greg Alexander	Alan Wilson	
Replacement	Chris Mortimer	Des Hasler	Phil Blake
Replacement	Glenn Lazarus	John Cartwright	

== 1990 Series ==
Position	Game 1	Game 2	Game 3
Fullback	Andrew Ettingshausen		
Wing	Rod Wishart		
Centre	Michael O'Connor	Brad Mackay	Michael O'Connor
Centre	Mark McGaw		
Wing	Ricky Walford	Graham Lyons	
Five-Eighth	Laurie Daley	Des Hasler	Brad Mackay
Halfback	Ricky Stuart		
Prop	Steve Roach		Glenn Lazarus
Hooker	Ben Elias (c)		
Prop	Ian Roberts		
Second Row	David Gillespie		
Second Row	Bruce McGuire		
Lock	Bradley Clyde		
Replacement	Glenn Lazarus		Mark Sargent
Replacement	Paul Sironen		
Replacement	Geoff Toovey	Andrew Farrar	Des Hasler
Replacement	Graham Lyons	Brad Fittler	Greg Alexander

== 1991 Series ==
Position	Game 1	Game 2	Game 3
Fullback	Greg Alexander	Andrew Ettingshausen	Greg Alexander
Wing	Chris Johns		
Centre	Andrew Ettingshausen	Michael O'Connor	
Centre	Laurie Daley		Mark McGaw
Wing	Michael O'Connor	Rod Wishart	
Five-Eighth	Cliff Lyons		Brad Fittler
Halfback	Ricky Stuart		
Prop	Steve Roach		
Hooker	Ben Elias (c)		
Prop	Ian Roberts	David Gillespie	
Second Row	Mark Geyer		John Cartwright
Second Row	Paul Sironen	Ian Roberts	Bradley Clyde
Lock	Des Hasler	Bradley Clyde	Brad Mackay
Interchange	Glenn Lazarus	Des Hasler	
Interchange	David Gillespie	Brad Mackay	Brad Izzard
Interchange	Mark McGaw		Craig Salvatori
Interchange	Brad Fittler	John Cartwright	David Fairleigh

== 1992 Series ==
Position	Game 1	Game 2	Game 3
Fullback	Andrew Ettingshausen		
Wing	Graham Mackay		Chris Johns
Centre	Brad Fittler		
Centre	Paul McGregor		
Wing	Rod Wishart		
Five-Eighth	Laurie Daley (c)		
Halfback	John Simon	Ricky Stuart	
Prop	Glenn Lazarus		
Hooker	Ben Elias		
Prop	Paul Harragon		
Second Row	Paul Sironen		
Second Row	John Cartwright		
Lock	Bradley Clyde		
Interchange	Robbie McCormack	Steve Carter	Tim Brasher
Interchange	Craig Salvatori		
Interchange	Brad Mackay		
Interchange	David Gillespie		

== 1993 Series ==
Position	Game 1	Game 2	Game 3
Fullback	Tim Brasher		
Wing	Andrew Ettingshausen		Graham Mackay
Centre	Paul McGregor		Andrew Ettingshausen
Centre	Brad Fittler		
Wing	Rod Wishart		
Five-Eighth	Laurie Daley (c)		
Halfback	Ricky Stuart		
Prop	Glenn Lazarus		
Hooker	Ben Elias	Robbie McCormack	Ben Elias
Prop	Ian Roberts		David Fairleigh
Second Row	Paul Sironen		
Second Row	Paul Harragon		
Lock	Brad Mackay		
Interchange	David Fairleigh		Terry Hill
Interchange	Craig Salvatori	David Gillespie	
Interchange	Brett Mullins	Jason Croker	Scott Gourley
Interchange	Jason Taylor		

== 1994 Series ==
Position	Game 1	Game 2	Game 3
Fullback	Tim Brasher		
Wing	Graham Mackay	Andrew Ettingshausen	
Centre	Brad Fittler (c)		
Centre	Paul McGregor		
Wing	Rod Wishart	Brett Mullins	
Five-Eighth	Laurie Daley		
Halfback	Ricky Stuart		
Prop	Glenn Lazarus		Ian Roberts
Hooker	Ben Elias		
Prop	Ian Roberts	Paul Harragon	
Second Row	Paul Sironen		
Second Row	Paul Harragon	Dean Pay	
Lock	Brad Mackay	Bradley Clyde	
Interchange	Andrew Ettingshausen	Brad Mackay	
Interchange	Chris Johns		
Interchange	David Gillespie	Ken Nagas	
Interchange	David Barnhill		

== 1995 Series ==
Position	Game 1	Game 2	Game 3
Fullback	Tim Brasher		
Wing	Rod Wishart		
Centre	Terry Hill		
Centre	Paul McGregor		
Wing	Craig Hancock	John Hopoate	David Hall
Five-Eighth	Matthew Johns	Brad Fittler (c)	Matthew Johns
Halfback	Andrew Johns		Geoff Toovey
Prop	Paul Harragon		
Hooker	Jim Serdaris		
Prop	Mark Carroll	Dean Pay	Mark Carroll
Second Row	Brad Mackay	Greg Florimo	Adam Muir
Second Row	Steve Menzies	David Barnhill	Steve Menzies
Lock	Brad Fittler (c)	Brad Mackay	Brad Fittler (c)
Interchange	Greg Florimo	Brett Rodwell	Greg Florimo
Interchange	David Fairleigh		
Interchange	Matt Seers	Steve Menzies	Matt Seers
Interchange	Adam Muir		David Barnhill

== 1996 Series ==
Position	Game 1	Game 2	Game 3
Fullback	Tim Brasher		
Wing	Rod Wishart		
Centre	Andrew Ettingshausen		
Centre	Laurie Daley		
Wing	Brett Mullins		
Five-Eighth	Brad Fittler (c)		
Halfback	Geoff Toovey		
Prop	Glenn Lazarus		
Hooker	Andrew Johns		
Prop	Paul Harragon		
Second Row	David Furner		
Second Row	Dean Pay		
Lock	Adam Muir		
Interchange	Jim Dymock		
Interchange	Jason Croker		
Interchange	Jamie Ainscough		
Interchange	Steve Menzies		

== 1997 Series ==
Position	Game 1	Game 2	Game 3	Super League Game 1 (versus Qld) ^{c}	Super League Game 2 (versus NZ) ^{c}	Super League Game 3 (versus Qld) ^{c}
Fullback	Tim Brasher			David Peachey		
Wing	Rod Wishart	Ken McGuinness		Ken Nagas		
Centre	Terry Hill			Andrew Ettingshausen		
Centre	Paul McGregor		Jamie Ainscough	Ryan Girdler		Matthew Ryan
Wing	Jamie Ainscough		Matt Seers	Matthew Ryan	Brett Mullins	
Five-Eighth	Jim Dymock		Trent Barrett	Laurie Daley (c)		
Halfback	Geoff Toovey (c)	John Simon	Geoff Toovey (c)	Greg Alexander	Noel Goldthorpe	
Prop	Paul Harragon			Glenn Lazarus		
Hooker	Andrew Johns	Geoff Toovey (c)	Andrew Johns	Craig Gower	Luke Priddis	Craig Gower
Prop	Mark Carroll			Rodney Howe	Ian Roberts	
Second Row	Steve Menzies			Sean Ryan	David Furner	
Second Row	Adam Muir			Simon Gillies		
Lock	Nik Kosef			David Furner	Bradley Clyde	
Interchange	David Fairleigh			Matt Adamson	Danny Lee	Robbie Kearns
Interchange	Dean Pay			Solomon Haumono		
Interchange	John Simon	Matt Seers	John Simon	Robbie Ross	Scott Wilson	Robbie Ross
Interchange	Ken McGuinness	Aaron Raper	Michael Buettner	Noel Goldthorpe	Matthew Ryan	Luke Priddis

== 1998 Series ==
Position	Game 1	Game 2	Game 3
Fullback	Tim Brasher		
Wing	Rod Wishart		
Centre	Andrew Ettingshausen	Paul McGregor	Laurie Daley (c)
Centre	Terry Hill		
Wing	Adam MacDougall		
Five-Eighth	Laurie Daley (c)		Brad Fittler
Halfback	Andrew Johns		
Prop	Rodney Howe		Glenn Lazarus
Hooker	Geoff Toovey		Matthew Johns
Prop	Paul Harragon		Tony Butterfield
Second Row	Dean Pay		David Furner
Second Row	Nik Kosef	David Barnhill	
Lock	Brad Fittler		Jim Dymock
Interchange	David Barnhill	Andrew Ettingshausen	Dean Pay
Interchange	Steve Menzies		
Interchange	Matthew Johns	Nik Kosef	Robbie Kearns
Interchange	Ken McGuinness	Glenn Lazarus	Ken McGuinness

== 1999 Series ==
Position	Game 1	Game 2	Game 3
Fullback	Robbie Ross		
Wing	Darren Albert	Adam MacDougall	
Centre	Laurie Daley	Ryan Girdler	
Centre	Terry Hill		
Wing	Matt Geyer		
Five-Eighth	Brad Fittler (c)	Laurie Daley	Laurie Daley (c)
Halfback	Andrew Johns		
Prop	Jason Stevens		Mark Carroll
Hooker	Craig Gower		Geoff Toovey
Prop	Rodney Howe		
Second Row	Bryan Fletcher		
Second Row	David Barnhill	Nik Kosef	David Furner
Lock	Nik Kosef	Brad Fittler (c)	Nik Kosef
Interchange	Glenn Lazarus	Michael Vella	
Interchange	Luke Ricketson		
Interchange	Ryan Girdler	Ben Kennedy	
Interchange	Anthony Mundine		

== 2000 Series ==
Position	Game 1	Game 2	Game 3
Fullback	David Peachey	Tim Brasher	
Wing	Adam MacDougall		
Centre	Ryan Girdler		
Centre	Shaun Timmins		Matt Gidley
Wing	Jamie Ainscough		
Five-Eighth	Brad Fittler (c)		
Halfback	Brett Kimmorley		
Prop	Robbie Kearns		
Hooker	Geoff Toovey		
Prop	Rodney Howe		Jason Stevens
Second Row	Bryan Fletcher		
Second Row	David Furner	Ben Kennedy	
Lock	Ben Kennedy	Scott Hill	
Interchange	Scott Hill	Andrew Johns	
Interchange	Terry Hill	David Furner	
Interchange	Michael Vella	Adam Muir	
Interchange	Jason Stevens		Michael Vella

== 2001 Series ==
Position	Game 1	Game 2	Game 3
Fullback	Mark Hughes		
Wing	Jamie Ainscough		
Centre	Michael De Vere	Ryan Girdler	
Centre	Matt Gidley		
Wing	Adam MacDougall		
Five-Eighth	Brad Fittler (c)		
Halfback	Brett Kimmorley	Trent Barrett	Brett Kimmorley
Prop	Jason Stevens		
Hooker	Luke Priddis		
Prop	Robbie Kearns	Mark O'Meley	
Second Row	Bryan Fletcher		
Second Row	Nathan Hindmarsh	Adam Muir	
Lock	Jason Croker	Luke Ricketson	Andrew Ryan
Interchange	Trent Barrett	Craig Gower	
Interchange	Michael Vella		
Interchange	Ben Kennedy	Matt Adamson	
Interchange	Rodney Howe	Andrew Ryan	Steve Menzies

== 2002 Series ==
Position	Game 1	Game 2	Game 3
Fullback	Brett Hodgson		
Wing	Timana Tahu		
Centre	Jamie Lyon		Matt Gidley
Centre	Matt Gidley	Shaun Timmins	
Wing	Jason Moodie		
Five-Eighth	Trent Barrett	Braith Anasta	Trent Barrett
Halfback	Andrew Johns (c)		
Prop	Luke Bailey		
Hooker	Danny Buderus		
Prop	Mark O'Meley		Jason Ryles
Second Row	Steve Simpson		
Second Row	Ben Kennedy	Nathan Hindmarsh	Steve Menzies
Lock	Luke Ricketson		
Interchange	Braith Anasta	Steve Menzies	Nathan Hindmarsh
Interchange	Bryan Fletcher		
Interchange	Nathan Hindmarsh	Scott Hill	
Interchange	Michael Vella		

== 2003 Series ==
Position	Game 1	Game 2	Game 3
Fullback	Anthony Minichiello		
Wing	Timana Tahu		
Centre	Matt Gidley		
Centre	Jamie Lyon		
Wing	Michael De Vere		
Five-Eighth	Shaun Timmins		
Halfback	Andrew Johns (c)		
Prop	Robbie Kearns		
Hooker	Danny Buderus		
Prop	Jason Ryles		
Second Row	Craig Fitzgibbon		Bryan Fletcher
Second Row	Ben Kennedy		Luke Ricketson
Lock	Luke Ricketson		Braith Anasta
Interchange	Luke Bailey		
Interchange	Phil Bailey		
Interchange	Craig Wing		
Interchange	Josh Perry	Bryan Fletcher	Willie Mason

== 2004 Series ==
Position	Game 1	Game 2	Game 3
Fullback	Ben Hornby	Anthony Minichiello	
Wing	Luke Lewis	Timana Tahu	Luke Lewis
Centre	Michael De Vere	Luke Lewis	Mark Gasnier
Centre	Matt Gidley		Matt Cooper
Wing	Luke Rooney		
Five-Eighth	Shaun Timmins	Brad Fittler	
Halfback	Craig Gower	Brett Finch	Trent Barrett
Prop	Ryan O'Hara	Jason Stevens	Jason Ryles
Hooker	Danny Buderus (c)		
Prop	Mark O'Meley		
Second Row	Nathan Hindmarsh		
Second Row	Andrew Ryan		Craig Fitzgibbon
Lock	Craig Fitzgibbon		Shaun Timmins
Interchange	Craig Wing		
Interchange	Trent Waterhouse		Ben Kennedy
Interchange	Brent Kite		
Interchange	Willie Mason		

== 2005 Series ==
Position	Game 1	Game 2	Game 3
Fullback	Anthony Minichiello		
Wing	Matt King		
Centre	Mark Gasnier		
Centre	Matt Cooper		
Wing	Luke Rooney		Timana Tahu
Five-Eighth	Trent Barrett	Braith Anasta	
Halfback	Brett Kimmorley	Andrew Johns	
Prop	Luke Bailey	Steve Simpson	Luke Bailey
Hooker	Danny Buderus (c)		
Prop	Jason Ryles		
Second Row	Nathan Hindmarsh		
Second Row	Craig Fitzgibbon		
Lock	Ben Kennedy		
Interchange	Craig Wing		Craig Gower
Interchange	Steve Simpson	Steve Menzies	
Interchange	Anthony Watmough	Luke Bailey	Steve Simpson
Interchange	Andrew Ryan		

== 2006 Series ==
Position	Game 1	Game 2	Game 3
Fullback	Brett Hodgson		
Wing	Matt King		Timana Tahu
Centre	Mark Gasnier		Matt Cooper
Centre	Timana Tahu		Matt King
Wing	Eric Grothe, Jr.		
Five-Eighth	Braith Anasta		Mark Gasnier
Halfback	Brett Finch		Craig Gower
Prop	Willie Mason		
Hooker	Danny Buderus (c)		
Prop	Brent Kite		Luke Bailey
Second Row	Nathan Hindmarsh		
Second Row	Andrew Ryan	Steve Simpson	Paul Gallen
Lock	Luke O'Donnell	Andrew Ryan	Luke O'Donnell
Interchange	Steve Simpson	Luke Bailey	Steve Simpson
Interchange	Craig Wing		Ben Hornby
Interchange	Steve Menzies		
Interchange	Mark O'Meley		

== 2007 Series ==
Position	Game 1	Game 2	Game 3
Fullback	Anthony Minichiello	Brett Stewart	
Wing	Matt King		Hazem El Masri
Centre	Jamie Lyon		Matt King
Centre	Matt Cooper		
Wing	Jarryd Hayne		
Five-Eighth	Braith Anasta		Greg Bird
Halfback	Jarrod Mullen	Brett Kimmorley	
Prop	Brett White	Steve Simpson	Willie Mason
Hooker	Danny Buderus (c)		
Prop	Brent Kite		
Second Row	Willie Mason		Andrew Ryan
Second Row	Nathan Hindmarsh		
Lock	Andrew Ryan		Paul Gallen
Interchange	Luke Bailey		
Interchange	Steve Simpson	Brett White	Steve Simpson
Interchange	Anthony Tupou	Ryan Hoffman	
Interchange	Kurt Gidley	Greg Bird	Kurt Gidley

== 2008 Series ==
Position	Game 1	Game 2	Game 3
Fullback	Brett Stewart		Kurt Gidley
Wing	Jarryd Hayne	Steve Turner	Jarryd Hayne
Centre	Matt Cooper		
Centre	Mark Gasnier		Joel Monaghan
Wing	Anthony Quinn		
Five-Eighth	Greg Bird		Braith Anasta
Halfback	Peter Wallace		Mitchell Pearce
Prop	Ben Cross	Craig Fitzgibbon	Willie Mason
Hooker	Danny Buderus (c)		
Prop	Brett White		
Second Row	Ryan Hoffman		
Second Row	Willie Mason		Craig Fitzgibbon
Lock	Paul Gallen		
Interchange	Anthony Laffranchi		
Interchange	Anthony Tupou		
Interchange	Craig Fitzgibbon	Steve Simpson	Ben Cross
Interchange	Ben Hornby	Kurt Gidley	Brett Stewart

== 2009 Series ==
Position	Game 1	Game 2	Game 3
Fullback	Kurt Gidley (C)		
Wing	Jarryd Hayne		
Centre	Michael Jennings	Joel Monaghan	Michael Jennings
Centre	Jamie Lyon		Josh Morris
Wing	James McManus	David Williams	
Five-Eighth	Terry Campese	Trent Barrett	
Halfback	Peter Wallace		Brett Kimmorley
Prop	Brent Kite		Justin Poore
Hooker	Robbie Farah		Michael Ennis
Prop	Luke Bailey	Michael Weyman	Josh Perry
Second Row	Luke O'Donnell		Trent Waterhouse
Second Row	Ben Creagh		
Lock	Anthony Laffranchi	Paul Gallen	Anthony Watmough
Interchange	Craig Wing	Josh Morris	Brett White
Interchange	Justin Poore		Craig Wing
Interchange	Michael Weyman	Anthony Watmough	Tom Learoyd-Lahrs
Interchange	Luke Lewis	Glenn Stewart	
Coach	Craig Bellamy		

== 2010 Series ==
Position	Game 1	Game 2	Game 3
Fullback	Kurt Gidley (c)	Jarryd Hayne	
Wing	Jarryd Hayne	Brett Morris	
Centre	Matt Cooper		Michael Jennings
Centre	Timana Tahu	Beau Scott	
Wing	Brett Morris	Joel Monaghan^{d}	Michael Gordon
Five-Eighth	Jamie Lyon	Trent Barrett (vc)	Trent Barrett (c)
Halfback	Brett Kimmorley	Mitchell Pearce	
Prop	Michael Weyman		Jason King
Hooker	Michael Ennis		
Prop	Josh Perry	Brett White	Kade Snowden
2nd Row	Trent Waterhouse	Nathan Hindmarsh^{e}	Luke Lewis
2nd Row	Ben Creagh		Paul Gallen
Lock	Anthony Watmough	Paul Gallen	Greg Bird
Interchange	Jamal Idris	Trent Waterhouse	Kurt Gidley
Interchange	Tom Learoyd-Lahrs	Kurt Gidley (c)	Tom Learoyd-Lahrs
Interchange	Luke Lewis	Tom Learoyd-Lahrs	Tim Mannah
Interchange	Brett White	Luke O'Donnell	Anthony Watmough
18th man ^{f}	Brett Finch	Jason King	Chris Lawrence
Coach	Craig Bellamy		

== 2011 Series ==
Position	Game 1	Game 2	Game 3
Fullback	Josh Dugan	Anthony Minichiello ^{h}	
Wing	Brett Morris	Jarryd Hayne	Brett Morris
Centre	Michael Jennings	William Hopoate	Jarryd Hayne
Centre	Mark Gasnier		
Wing	Akuila Uate		
Five-Eighth	Jamie Soward		
Halfback	Mitchell Pearce		
Prop	Jason King	Tim Mannah	
Hooker	Dean Young ^{g}	Michael Ennis	
Prop	Kade Snowden	Paul Gallen (c)	
2nd Row	Beau Scott		Glenn Stewart
2nd Row	Greg Bird	Ben Creagh	
Lock	Paul Gallen (c)	Greg Bird	
Interchange	Ben Creagh	Kurt Gidley	
Interchange	Trent Merrin		Keith Galloway
Interchange	Tim Mannah	Anthony Watmough	
Interchange	Michael Ennis	Luke Lewis	
18th man ^{f}	Jamal Idris	Tom Learoyd-Lahrs	Trent Merrin
Coach	Ricky Stuart		

== 2012 Series ==
Position	Game 1	Game 2	Game 3
Fullback	Brett Stewart		
Wing	Jarryd Hayne		
Centre	Michael Jennings		
Centre	Josh Morris		
Wing	Akuila Uate		Brett Morris
Five-Eighth	Todd Carney		
Halfback	Mitchell Pearce		
Prop	Paul Gallen (c)	Tim Grant	
Hooker	Robbie Farah		
Prop	James Tamou		
2nd Row	Luke Lewis	Greg Bird	
2nd Row	Glenn Stewart		Beau Scott ^{2}
Lock	Greg Bird	Paul Gallen (c)	
Interchange	Trent Merrin		Tony Williams
Interchange	Jamie Buhrer	Luke Lewis	
Interchange	Ben Creagh		
Interchange	Tony Williams	Anthony Watmough	
Coach	Ricky Stuart		

* Michael Jennings became the first selected player not to be playing First Grade since 1982 when Phil Duke was selected from the Moree Boomerangs in northern NSW after playing for Country Origin.

== 2013 Series ==
Position	Game 1	Game 2	Game 3
Fullback	Jarryd Hayne	Josh Dugan	
Wing	Brett Morris		
Centre	Michael Jennings		
Centre	Josh Morris		
Wing	Blake Ferguson	Nathan Merritt^{1}	James McManus^{2}
Five-Eighth	James Maloney		
Halfback	Mitchell Pearce		
Prop	Paul Gallen (c)		Aaron Woods^{3}
Hooker	Robbie Farah		Robbie Farah (c)^{3}
Prop	James Tamou	Aaron Woods	James Tamou
Second Row	Luke Lewis		
Second Row	Ryan Hoffman		
Lock	Greg Bird		
Interchange	Andrew Fifita		
Interchange	Trent Merrin		
Interchange	Josh Reynolds^{4}		Boyd Cordner^{5}
Interchange	Anthony Watmough		
Coach	Laurie Daley		
18th Man	John Sutton		Josh Reynolds^{5}

1 - Blake Ferguson was originally selected to play in game two but was withdrawn after being suspended by the NRL. He was replaced by Nathan Merritt.
2 - Jarryd Hayne was originally selected to play in game three but withdrew due to injury. He was replaced by James McManus.
3 - Paul Gallen was originally selected to play in game three but withdrew due to injury. He was replaced by Aaron Woods as prop, and Robbie Farah as captain.
4 - Kurt Gidley was originally selected to play in game one but withdrew due to injury. He was replaced by Josh Reynolds.
5 - Josh Reynolds was originally selected to play in game three but under consultation with coach Laurie Daley was dropped to 18th Man. He was replaced by Boyd Cordner

== 2014 Series ==
Position	Game 1	Game 2	Game 3
Fullback	Jarryd Hayne		
Wing	Brett Morris	Will Hopoate	James McManus
Centre	Josh Morris	Josh Dugan	
Centre	Michael Jennings		Josh Morris
Wing	Daniel Tupou		
Five-eighth	Josh Reynolds		
Halfback	Trent Hodkinson		
Prop	Aaron Woods	Paul Gallen (c)	
Hooker	Robbie Farah		
Prop	James Tamou	Aaron Woods	
Second row	Beau Scott		
Second row	Ryan Hoffman		
Lock	Paul Gallen (c)	Greg Bird	
Interchange	Trent Merrin	James Tamou	
Interchange	Anthony Watmough		Boyd Cordner
Interchange	Luke Lewis	Trent Merrin	
Interchange	Tony Williams	Luke Lewis	
Coach	Laurie Daley		
18th Man	Josh Jackson	Tony Williams	
19th Man	Will Hopoate		Jarrod Croker

== 2015 series ==
Position	Game 1	Game 2	Game 3
Fullback	Josh Dugan		
Wing	Will Hopoate		
Centre	Josh Morris		
Centre	Michael Jennings		
Wing	Daniel Tupou	Brett Morris	
Five-eighth	Mitchell Pearce		
Halfback	Trent Hodkinson		
Prop	Aaron Woods		
Hooker	Robbie Farah (c)	Robbie Farah	Michael Ennis^{2}
Prop	James Tamou		
Second row	Beau Scott		
Second row	Ryan Hoffman		
Lock	Josh Jackson	Paul Gallen (c)^{1}	
Interchange	Trent Merrin		
Interchange	Boyd Cordner		
Interchange	David Klemmer		
Interchange	Andrew Fifita	Josh Jackson	
Coach	Laurie Daley		
18th Man	Tyson Frizell	Tariq Sims	
19th Man	Ryan James	Dylan Walker	Alex Johnston
20th Man	Matt Moylan		

1 - Gallen retained the captaincy role from Farah in Game II.

2 - Robbie Farah was originally chosen to play in Game lll but withdrew due to a hand injury, he was replaced by Michael Ennis.

== 2016 series ==
Position	Game 1	Game 2	Game 3
Fullback	Matt Moylan		James Tedesco
Wing	Blake Ferguson		
Centre	Michael Jennings		
Centre	Josh Morris^{1}	Dylan Walker^{4}	Josh Dugan
Wing	Josh Mansour		
Five-eighth	James Maloney		Matt Moylan^{5}
Halfback	Adam Reynolds		James Maloney^{5}
Prop	Aaron Woods		
Hooker	Robbie Farah		
Prop	James Tamou^{2}		Paul Gallen (c)
Second row	Boyd Cordner	Tyson Frizell^{3}	Wade Graham
Second row	Josh Jackson		
Lock	Paul Gallen^{2} (c)		Tyson Frizell
Interchange	Dylan Walker	Jack Bird^{4}	
Interchange	Greg Bird^{2}		James Tamou
Interchange	David Klemmer		
Interchange	Andrew Fifita		
Coach	Laurie Daley		
18th man	Tyson Frizell	Bryce Cartwright	
19th man			Tom Trbojevic
20th man			Jake Trbojevic

1 - Josh Dugan was originally selected to play in Game I, but he withdrew due to an elbow injury. He was replaced by Josh Morris.
2 - James Tamou was originally selected to start on the bench in Game I, but however on game day he swapped positions with Greg Bird. Bird was moved from lock to bench, Tamou moved from bench to prop and Paul Gallen from prop to lock.
3 - Wade Graham was originally selected to play in Game II, but he was suspended. He was replaced by Tyson Frizell.
4 - Josh Morris was originally selected to play in Game II, but was forced out due to injury. Dylan Walker was moved from the bench to centre, while Jack Bird was promoted from 19th man to the bench.
5 - Adam Reynolds was originally selected to play halfback in Game III, but withdrew due to injury. James Maloney shifted from five-eighth to halfback and Matt Moylan, who had originally been dropped from the squad for James Tedesco, was recalled into the squad to start at five-eighth.

== 2017 Series ==
Position	Game I	Game II	Game III
Fullback	James Tedesco		
Wing	Brett Morris		
Centre	Josh Dugan		
Centre	Jarryd Hayne		
Wing	Blake Ferguson		
Five-eighth	James Maloney		
Halfback	Mitchell Pearce		
Prop	Aaron Woods		
Hooker	Nathan Peats		
Prop	Andrew Fifita		
Second row	Boyd Cordner (c)		
Second row	Josh Jackson		
Lock	Tyson Frizell		
Interchange	David Klemmer		
Interchange	Wade Graham		
Interchange	Jake Trbojevic		
Interchange	Jack Bird		
Coach	Laurie Daley		
18th	Matt Moylan		Jack de Belin
19th	Jordan McLean	Jack de Belin	Dale Finucane
20th	Jack de Belin	Tom Trbojevic	

Notes

- Peter Wallace was originally going to be selected to play hooker but was ruled out for the entire series with a groin injury. Titan Nathan Peats played instead.

== 2018 Series ==
Position	Game 1	Game 2	Game 3
Fullback	James Tedesco		
Wing	Tom Trbojevic		
Centre	Latrell Mitchell		
Centre	James Roberts		
Wing	Josh Addo-Carr		
Five-eighth	James Maloney		
Halfback	Nathan Cleary		
Prop	David Klemmer		
Hooker	Damien Cook		
Prop	Reagan Campbell-Gillard	Matt Prior	Paul Vaughan
Second row	Boyd Cordner (c)		
Second row	Tyson Frizell		
Lock	Jack de Belin		Jake Trbojevic
Interchange	Paul Vaughan		Jack de Belin
Interchange	Jake Trbojevic		Tariq Sims
Interchange	Angus Crichton		
Interchange	Tyrone Peachey		
Coach	Brad Fittler		

== 2019 Series ==
Position	Game 1	Game 2	Game 3
Fullback	James Tedesco		
Wing	Nick Cotric	Blake Ferguson	
Centre	Latrell Mitchell	Tom Trbojevic	
Centre	Josh Morris	Jack Wighton	
Wing	Josh Addo-Carr		
Five-eighth	Cody Walker	James Maloney	
Halfback	Nathan Cleary		Mitchell Pearce^{1}
Prop	David Klemmer	Daniel Saifiti	
Hooker	Damien Cook		
Prop	Paul Vaughan		
Second row	Boyd Cordner (c)		
Second row	Tyson Frizell		
Lock	Jake Trbojevic		
Interchange	Jack Wighton	Dale Finucane	
Interchange	Payne Haas	Tariq Sims	David Klemmer^{2}
Interchange	Cameron Murray		
Interchange	Angus Crichton	Wade Graham	
Coach	Brad Fittler		
18th man	Ryan Matterson		Clinton Gutherson
19th man	Victor Radley	Clinton Gutherson	

^{1} – Nathan Cleary was originally selected in the squad for game three, but was forced to withdraw due to injury. He was replaced by Mitchell Pearce.

^{2} – Tariq Sims was originally selected in the squad for game three, but was forced to withdraw due to suspension. He was replaced by David Klemmer.

== 2020 Series ==
Position	Game 1	Game 2	Game 3
Fullback	James Tedesco	James Tedesco (c)	
Wing	Daniel Tupou		
Centre	Clinton Gutherson		
Centre	Jack Wighton		
Wing	Josh Addo-Carr		
Five-eighth	Luke Keary	Cody Walker	
Halfback	Nathan Cleary		
Prop	Daniel Saifiti		
Hooker	Damien Cook		
Prop	Junior Paulo	Payne Haas	
Second row	Boyd Cordner (c)	Angus Crichton	
Second row	Tyson Frizell		
Lock	Jake Trbojevic		
Interchange	Cody Walker	Dale Finucane	
Interchange	Payne Haas	Junior Paulo	
Interchange	Cameron Murray	Nathan Brown	
Interchange	Angus Crichton	Isaah Yeo	
Coach	Brad Fittler		

== 2021 Series ==
Position	Game 1	Game 2	Game 3
Fullback	James Tedesco (c)		
Wing	Brian To'o		
Centre	Latrell Mitchell		
Centre	Tom Trbojevic		
Wing	Josh Addo-Carr		
Five-eighth	Jarome Luai		Jack Wighton
Halfback	Nathan Cleary		Mitchell Moses
Prop	Daniel Saifiti		Junior Paulo
Hooker	Damien Cook		
Prop	Jake Trbojevic	Junior Paulo	Dale Finucane
Second row	Cameron Murray		
Second row	Tariq Sims		
Lock	Isaah Yeo		
Interchange	Jack Wighton		Apisai Koroisau
Interchange	Junior Paulo	Angus Crichton	
Interchange	Payne Haas		
Interchange	Liam Martin		
18th man	Apisai Koroisau		Nicho Hynes
Coach	Brad Fittler		

== 2022 Series ==
Position	Game 1	Game 2	Game 3
Fullback	James Tedesco (c)		
Wing	Brian To'o		
Centre	Kotoni Staggs	Matt Burton	
Centre	Jack Wighton	Stephen Crichton	
Wing	Daniel Tupou		
Five-eighth	Jarome Luai		
Halfback	Nathan Cleary		
Prop	Payne Haas		Junior Paulo
Hooker	Damien Cook	Apisai Koroisau	
Prop	Reagan Campbell-Gillard	Jake Trbojevic	
Second row	Tariq Sims	Cameron Murray	
Second row	Liam Martin		
Lock	Isaah Yeo		
Interchange	Stephen Crichton	Damien Cook	
Interchange	Cameron Murray	Angus Crichton	
Interchange	Junior Paulo		Jacob Saifiti^{1}
Interchange	Ryan Matterson	Siosifa Talakai	
18th man	Nicho Hynes		Jack Wighton
Coach	Brad Fittler		

^{1} – Jordan McLean was originally selected in the squad for game three, but was forced to withdraw due to injury. He was replaced by Jacob Saifiti.

== 2023 Series ==
Position	Game 1	Game 2	Game 3
Fullback	James Tedesco (c)		
Wing	Brian To'o		
Centre	Stephen Crichton		
Centre	Tom Trbojevic		Bradman Best
Wing	Josh Addo-Carr		
Five-eighth	Jarome Luai		Cody Walker
Halfback	Nathan Cleary	Mitchell Moses	
Prop	Tevita Pangai Junior	Junior Paulo	Jake Trbojevic
Hooker	Apisai Koroisau	Reece Robson	Damien Cook
Prop	Payne Haas		Reagan Campbell-Gillard
Second row	Tyson Frizell		Liam Martin
Second row	Hudson Young		Keaon Koloamatangi
Lock	Isaah Yeo		Cameron Murray
Interchange	Junior Paulo	Stefano Utoikamanu	Isaah Yeo
Interchange	Cameron Murray		Jacob Saifiti
Interchange	Liam Martin		Reece Robson
Interchange	Nicho Hynes	Damien Cook	Clinton Gutherson
Replacement	Matt Burton		Scott Drinkwater
Reserve	Stefano Utoikamanu	Keaon Koloamatangi	Spencer Leniu
Coach	Brad Fittler		

== 2024 Series ==
Position	Game 1	Game 2	Game 3
Fullback	James Tedesco	Dylan Edwards	
Wing	Brian To'o		
Centre	Joseph Sua'ali'i	Latrell Mitchell	Bradman Best
Centre	Stephen Crichton		
Wing	Zac Lomax		
Five-eighth	Jarome Luai		
Halfback	Nicho Hynes	Mitchell Moses	
Prop	Jake Trbojevic (c)		
Hooker	Reece Robson		
Prop	Payne Haas		
Second row	Liam Martin		
Second row	Angus Crichton		
Lock	Cameron McInnes	Cameron Murray	
Interchange	Hudson Young	Connor Watson	
Interchange	Isaah Yeo		
Interchange	Haumole Olakau'atu		Mitchell Barnett
Interchange	Spencer Leniu		
Replacement	Matt Burton	Mitchell Barnett	Matt Burton
Reserve	Mitchell Barnett	Cameron McInnes	Haumole Olakau'atu
Reserve	Luke Keary		Joseph Sua'ali'i
Coach	Michael Maguire		

== 2025 Series ==
Position	Game 1	Game 2	Game 3
Fullback	Dylan Edwards		
Wing	Brian To'o		
Centre	Latrell Mitchell		
Centre	Stephen Crichton		
Wing	Zac Lomax		
Five-eighth	Mitchell Moses	Jarome Luai	
Halfback	Nathan Cleary		
Prop	Mitchell Barnett	Max King	
Hooker	Reece Robson		
Prop	Payne Haas		
Second row	Liam Martin		
Second row	Angus Crichton		
Lock	Isaah Yeo (c)		
Interchange	Connor Watson		
Interchange	Spencer Leniu		
Interchange	Hudson Young		
Interchange	Max King	Stefano Utoikamanu	
Replacement	Campbell Graham	Matt Burton	Jacob Kiraz
Reserve	Stefano Utoikamanu	Jacob Preston	Lindsay Smith
Reserve	Haumole Olakau'atu	Lindsay Smith	Bradman Best
Coach	Laurie Daley		

== 2026 Series ==
Position	Game 1	Game 2	Game 3
Fullback			
Wing			
Centre			
Centre			
Wing			
Five-eighth			
Halfback			
Prop			
Hooker			
Prop			
Second row			
Second row			
Lock			
Interchange			
Interchange			
Interchange			
Interchange			
Interchange			
Interchange			
Replacement			
Reserve			
Reserve			
Coach	Laurie Daley		

== Notes ==
a. Only one State of Origin game was played in both 1980 and 1981.
b. Exhibition match played at Veterans Memorial Stadium in Long Beach, California, United States.
c. Only Super League players could play in the Super League Tri-series.
d. Timana Tahu was originally selected to play but withdrew due to personal reasons. He was replaced by Joel Monaghan
e. Hindmarsh switched places with Waterhouse to play in the starting side after being initially selected for the bench.
f. The 18th man is a reserve to cover for any forthcoming injuries and, unless chosen, does not actually play.
g. Dean Young switched places with Michael Ennis to play in the starting side after being initially selected for the bench.
h. Josh Dugan was originally selected to play but withdrew due to injury. He was replaced by Anthony Minichiello.
