= List of New South Wales State of Origin players =

This article lists all rugby league footballers who have represented the New South Wales rugby league team in matches played since 1980 against Queensland under State of Origin selection criteria. Players are listed according to the date of their debut game. Tom Raudonikis is first as he was the first captain. Players' cap numbers are those designated by the NSWRL.

== List of players ==
Cap no.	Name	Debut year	Debut game	Club
1.	Tom Raudonikis	1980	Game 1	Newtown Jets
2.	Chris Anderson	1980	Game 1	Canterbury-Bankstown Bulldogs
3.	Greg Brentnall	1980	Game 1	Canterbury-Bankstown Bulldogs
4.	Bob Cooper	1980	Game 1	Western Suburbs Magpies
5.	Mick Cronin	1980	Game 1	Parramatta Eels
6.	Graham Eadie	1980	Game 1	Manly Warringah Sea Eagles
7.	Steve Edge	1980	Game 1	Parramatta Eels
8.	Gary Hambly	1980	Game 1	South Sydney Rabbitohs
9.	Jim Leis	1980	Game 1	Western Suburbs Magpies
10.	Steve Rogers	1980	Game 1	Cronulla-Sutherland Sharks
11.	Alan Thompson	1980	Game 1	Manly Warringah Sea Eagles
12.	Graeme Wynn	1980	Game 1	St. George Dragons
13.	Craig Young	1980	Game 1	St. George Dragons
14.	Robert Stone	1980	Game 1	St. George Dragons
15.	Steve Bowden	1981	Game 1	Newtown Jets
16.	Les Boyd	1981	Game 1	Manly Warringah Sea Eagles
17.	Terry Fahey	1981	Game 1	Sydney Roosters
18.	Eric Grothe, Sr.	1981	Game 1	Parramatta Eels
19.	Ron Hilditch	1981	Game 1	Parramatta Eels
20.	Barry Jensen	1981	Game 1	Newtown Jets
21.	Terry Lamb	1981	Game 1	Western Suburbs Magpies
22.	Ray Price	1981	Game 1	Parramatta Eels
23.	Phil Sigsworth	1981	Game 1	Newtown Jets
24.	Peter Sterling	1981	Game 1	Parramatta Eels
25.	Peter Tunks	1981	Game 1	South Sydney Rabbitohs
26.	Garry Dowling	1981	Game 1	Parramatta Eels
27.	John Coveney	1982	Game 1	Canterbury-Bankstown Bulldogs
28.	Max Krilich	1982	Game 1	Manly Warringah Sea Eagles
29.	Steve Mortimer	1982	Game 1	Canterbury-Bankstown Bulldogs
30.	John Muggleton	1982	Game 1	Parramatta Eels
31.	Ziggy Niszczot	1982	Game 1	South Sydney Rabbitohs
32.	Tony Rampling	1982	Game 1	South Sydney Rabbitohs
33.	Royce Ayliffe	1982	Game 1	Sydney Roosters
34.	Brad Izzard	1982	Game 1	Penrith Panthers
35.	Tony Melrose	1982	Game 2	South Sydney Rabbitohs
36.	Brett Kenny	1982	Game 2	Parramatta Eels
37.	Phillip Duke	1982	Game 3	Moree Boomerangs
38.	Don McKinnon	1982	Game 3	North Sydney Bears
39.	Paul Merlo	1982	Game 3	Western Suburbs Magpies
40.	Geoff Bugden	1983	Game 1	Parramatta Eels
41.	Geoff Gerard	1983	Game 1	Manly Warringah Sea Eagles
42.	Wayne Pearce	1983	Game 1	Balmain Tigers
43.	Ray Brown	1983	Game 1	Manly Warringah Sea Eagles
44.	Steve Ella	1983	Game 1	Parramatta Eels
45.	Paul Field	1983	Game 2	Cootamundra
46.	Marty Gurr	1983	Game 2	Sydney Roosters
47.	Neil Hunt	1983	Game 2	Parramatta Eels
48.	Lindsay Johnston	1983	Game 2	North Sydney Bears
49.	Gavin Miller	1983	Game 2	Cronulla-Sutherland Sharks
50.	Stan Jurd	1983	Game 2	Parramatta Eels
51.	Kevin Hastings	1983	Game 3	Sydney Roosters
52.	Noel Cleal	1984	Game 1	Manly Warringah Sea Eagles
53.	Ross Conlon	1984	Game 1	Canterbury-Bankstown Bulldogs
54.	Garry Jack	1984	Game 1	Balmain Tigers
55.	Steve Roach	1984	Game 1	Balmain Tigers
56.	Rex Wright	1984	Game 1	Northern Suburbs Blues
57.	Brian Hetherington	1984	Game 1	Illawarra Steelers
58.	Pat Jarvis	1984	Game 1	St. George Dragons
59.	Andrew Farrar	1984	Game 2	Canterbury-Bankstown Bulldogs
60.	Royce Simmons	1984	Game 2	Penrith Panthers
61.	Brian Johnston	1984	Game 2	St. George Dragons
62.	Steve Morris	1984	Game 3	St. George Dragons
63.	Chris Mortimer	1984	Game 3	Canterbury-Bankstown Bulldogs
64.	Chris Walsh	1984	Game 3	St. George Dragons
65.	Peter Wynn	1984	Game 3	Parramatta Eels
66.	Michael Potter	1984	Game 3	Canterbury-Bankstown Bulldogs
67.	Benny Elias	1985	Game 1	Balmain Tigers
68.	John Ferguson	1985	Game 1	Sydney Roosters
69.	Michael O'Connor	1985	Game 1	St. George Dragons
70.	David Brooks	1985	Game 3	Balmain Tigers
71.	Des Hasler	1985	Game 3	Manly Warringah Sea Eagles
72.	Steve Folkes	1986	Game 1	Canterbury-Bankstown Bulldogs
73.	David Gillespie	1986	Game 1	Canterbury-Bankstown Bulldogs
74.	Les Davidson	1987	Game 1	South Sydney Rabbitohs
75.	Andrew Ettingshausen	1987	Game 1	Cronulla-Sutherland Sharks
76.	Mark McGaw	1987	Game 1	Cronulla-Sutherland Sharks
77.	David Boyle	1987	Game 1	South Sydney Rabbitohs
78.	Paul Langmack	1987	Game 2	Canterbury-Bankstown Bulldogs
79.	Phil Daley	1987	Game 3	Manly Warringah Sea Eagles
80.	Cliff Lyons	1987	Game 3	Manly Warringah Sea Eagles
81.	Jonathan Docking	1987	Game 4	Cronulla-Sutherland Sharks
82.	David Trewhella	1988	Game 1	Sydney Roosters
83.	Paul Dunn	1988	Game 2	Canterbury-Bankstown Bulldogs
84.	Steve Hanson	1988	Game 3	North Sydney Bears
85.	Greg Florimo	1988	Game 3	North Sydney Bears
86.	John Cartwright	1989	Game 1	Penrith Panthers
87.	Bradley Clyde	1989	Game 1	Canberra Raiders
88.	Laurie Daley	1989	Game 1	Canberra Raiders
89.	Mario Fenech	1989	Game 1	South Sydney Rabbitohs
90.	Chris Johns	1989	Game 1	Brisbane Broncos
91.	Paul Sironen	1989	Game 1	Balmain Tigers
92.	Greg Alexander	1989	Game 1	Penrith Panthers
93.	Glenn Lazarus	1989	Game 1	Canberra Raiders
94.	Peter Kelly	1989	Game 2	Penrith Panthers
95.	Bruce McGuire	1989	Game 2	Balmain Tigers
96.	Brad Mackay	1989	Game 2	St. George Dragons
97.	Alan Wilson	1989	Game 2	Cronulla-Sutherland Sharks
98.	Mark Geyer	1989	Game 3	Penrith Panthers
99.	Phil Blake	1989	Game 3	South Sydney Rabbitohs
100.	Terry Matterson	1989	Game 3	Brisbane Broncos
101.	Ian Roberts	1990	Game 1	Manly Warringah Sea Eagles
102.	Ricky Stuart	1990	Game 1	Canberra Raiders
103.	Ricky Walford	1990	Game 1	St. George Dragons
104.	Rod Wishart	1990	Game 1	Illawarra Steelers
105.	Graham Lyons	1990	Game 1	South Sydney Rabbitohs
106.	Geoff Toovey	1990	Game 1	Manly Warringah Sea Eagles
107.	Brad Fittler	1990	Game 2	Penrith Panthers
108.	Mark Sargent	1990	Game 3	Newcastle Knights
109.	David Fairleigh	1991	Game 3	North Sydney Bears
110.	Craig Salvatori	1991	Game 3	Sydney Roosters
111.	Paul Harragon	1992	Game 1	Newcastle Knights
112.	Graham Mackay	1992	Game 1	Penrith Panthers
113.	Paul McGregor	1992	Game 1	Illawarra Steelers
114.	John Simon	1992	Game 1	Illawarra Steelers
115.	Robbie McCormack	1992	Game 1	Newcastle Knights
116.	Steve Carter	1992	Game 2	Penrith Panthers
117.	Tim Brasher	1992	Game 3	Balmain Tigers
118.	Jason Croker	1993	Game 2	Canberra Raiders
119.	Jason Taylor	1993	Game 1	Western Suburbs Magpies
120.	Scott Gourley	1993	Game 3	St. George Dragons
121.	Terry Hill	1993	Game 3	Western Suburbs Magpies
122.	David Barnhill	1994	Game 1	St. George Dragons
123.	Brett Mullins	1994	Game 2	Canberra Raiders
124.	Dean Pay	1994	Game 2	Canterbury-Bankstown Bulldogs
125.	Ken Nagas	1994	Game 2	Canberra Raiders
126.	Mark Carroll	1995	Game 1	Manly Warringah Sea Eagles
127.	Craig Hancock	1995	Game 1	Manly Warringah Sea Eagles
128.	Andrew Johns	1995	Game 1	Newcastle Knights
129.	Matthew Johns	1995	Game 1	Newcastle Knights
130.	Steve Menzies	1995	Game 1	Manly Warringah Sea Eagles
131.	Jim Serdaris	1995	Game 1	Western Suburbs Magpies
132.	Adam Muir	1995	Game 1	Newcastle Knights
133.	Matt Seers	1995	Game 1	North Sydney Bears
134.	John Hopoate	1995	Game 2	Manly Warringah Sea Eagles
135.	Brett Rodwell	1995	Game 2	Illawarra Steelers
136.	David Hall	1995	Game 3	North Sydney Bears
137.	David Furner	1996	Game 1	Canberra Raiders
138.	Jamie Ainscough	1996	Game 1	Newcastle Knights
139.	Jim Dymock	1996	Game 1	Parramatta Eels
140.	Nik Kosef	1997	Game 1	Manly Warringah Sea Eagles
141.	Ken McGuinness	1997	Game 1	Western Suburbs Magpies
142.	Trent Barrett	1997	Game 3	Illawarra Steelers
143.	Michael Buettner	1997	Game 3	North Sydney Bears
144.	Rodney Howe	1998	Game 1	Melbourne Storm
145.	Adam MacDougall	1998	Game 1	Newcastle Knights
146.	Tony Butterfield	1998	Game 3	Newcastle Knights
147.	Robbie Kearns	1998	Game 3	Melbourne Storm
148.	Darren Albert	1999	Game 1	Newcastle Knights
149.	Bryan Fletcher	1999	Game 1	Sydney Roosters
150.	Matt Geyer	1999	Game 1	Melbourne Storm
151.	Craig Gower	2001	Game 2	Penrith Panthers
152.	Robbie Ross	1999	Game 1	Melbourne Storm
153.	Jason Stevens	2000	Game 1	Cronulla-Sutherland Sharks
154.	Ryan Girdler	1999	Game 1	Penrith Panthers
155.	Anthony Mundine	1999	Game 1	St. George Illawarra Dragons
156.	Luke Ricketson	1999	Game 1	Sydney Roosters
157.	Ben Kennedy	1999	Game 2	Canberra Raiders
158.	Michael Vella	1999	Game 2	Parramatta Eels
159.	Brett Kimmorley	2000	Game 1	Melbourne Storm
160.	David Peachey	2000	Game 1	Cronulla-Sutherland Sharks
161.	Shaun Timmins	2000	Game 1	St. George Illawarra Dragons
162.	Scott Hill	2000	Game 1	Melbourne Storm
163.	Matthew Gidley	2000	Game 3	Newcastle Knights
164.	Michael De Vere	2001	Game 1	Brisbane Broncos
165.	Nathan Hindmarsh	2001	Game 1	Parramatta Eels
166.	Mark Hughes	2001	Game 1	Newcastle Knights
167.	Luke Priddis	2001	Game 1	Brisbane Broncos
168.	Mark O'Meley	2001	Game 2	Northern Eagles
169.	Matt Adamson	2001	Game 2	Penrith Panthers
170.	Andrew Ryan	2001	Game 2	Parramatta Eels
171.	Luke Bailey	2002	Game 1	St. George Illawarra Dragons
172.	Danny Buderus	2002	Game 1	Newcastle Knights
173.	Brett Hodgson	2002	Game 1	Parramatta Eels
174.	Jamie Lyon	2002	Game 1	Parramatta Eels
175.	Jason Moodie	2002	Game 1	Parramatta Eels
176.	Steve Simpson	2002	Game 1	Newcastle Knights
177.	Timana Tahu	2002	Game 1	Newcastle Knights
178.	Braith Anasta	2002	Game 1	Canterbury-Bankstown Bulldogs
179.	Jason Ryles	2002	Game 3	St. George Illawarra Dragons
180.	Craig Fitzgibbon	2003	Game 1	Sydney Roosters
181.	Anthony Minichiello	2003	Game 1	Sydney Roosters
182.	Phil Bailey	2003	Game 1	Cronulla-Sutherland Sharks
183.	Josh Perry	2003	Game 1	Newcastle Knights
184.	Craig Wing	2003	Game 1	Sydney Roosters
185.	Willie Mason	2003	Game 3	Canterbury-Bankstown Bulldogs
186.	Ben Hornby	2004	Game 1	St. George Illawarra Dragons
187.	Luke Lewis	2004	Game 1	Penrith Panthers
188.	Ryan O'Hara	2004	Game 1	Canberra Raiders
189.	Luke Rooney	2004	Game 1	Penrith Panthers
190.	Brent Kite	2004	Game 1	St. George Illawarra Dragons
191.	Trent Waterhouse	2004	Game 1	Penrith Panthers
192.	Brett Finch	2004	Game 2	Sydney Roosters
193.	Matt Cooper	2004	Game 3	St. George Illawarra Dragons
194.	Mark Gasnier	2004	Game 3	St. George Illawarra Dragons
195.	Matt King	2005	Game 1	Melbourne Storm
196.	Anthony Watmough	2005	Game 1	Manly Warringah Sea Eagles
197.	Eric Grothe, Jr.	2006	Game 1	Parramatta Eels
198.	Luke O'Donnell	2006	Game 1	North Queensland Cowboys
199.	Paul Gallen	2006	Game 3	Cronulla-Sutherland Sharks
200.	Jarryd Hayne	2007	Game 1	Parramatta Eels
201.	Jarrod Mullen	2007	Game 1	Newcastle Knights
202.	Brett White	2007	Game 1	Melbourne Storm
203.	Kurt Gidley	2007	Game 1	Newcastle Knights
204.	Anthony Tupou	2007	Game 1	Sydney Roosters
205.	Brett Stewart	2007	Game 2	Manly Warringah Sea Eagles
206.	Greg Bird	2007	Game 2	Cronulla-Sutherland Sharks
207.	Ryan Hoffman	2007	Game 2	Melbourne Storm
208.	Hazem El Masri	2007	Game 3	Canterbury-Bankstown Bulldogs
209.	Ben Cross	2008	Game 1	Newcastle Knights
210.	Anthony Quinn	2008	Game 1	Melbourne Storm
211.	Peter Wallace	2008	Game 1	Brisbane Broncos
212.	Anthony Laffranchi	2008	Game 1	Gold Coast Titans
213.	Steve Turner	2008	Game 2	Melbourne Storm
214.	Joel Monaghan	2008	Game 3	Canberra Raiders
215.	Mitchell Pearce	2008	Game 3	Sydney Roosters
216.	Michael Jennings	2009	Game 1	Penrith Panthers
217.	James McManus	2009	Game 1	Newcastle Knights
218.	Terry Campese	2009	Game 1	Canberra Raiders
219.	Robbie Farah	2009	Game 1	Wests Tigers
220.	Ben Creagh	2009	Game 1	St. George Illawarra Dragons
221.	Justin Poore	2009	Game 1	St. George Illawarra Dragons
222.	Glenn Stewart	2009	Game 2	Manly Warringah Sea Eagles
223.	Michael Weyman	2009	Game 1	St. George Illawarra Dragons
224.	David Williams	2009	Game 2	Manly Warringah Sea Eagles
225.	Josh Morris	2009	Game 2	Canterbury-Bankstown Bulldogs
226.	Michael Ennis	2009	Game 3	Canterbury-Bankstown Bulldogs
227.	Tom Learoyd-Lahrs	2009	Game 3	Canberra Raiders
228.	Brett Morris	2010	Game 1	St. George Illawarra Dragons
229.	Jamal Idris	2010	Game 1	Canterbury-Bankstown Bulldogs
230.	Beau Scott	2010	Game 2	St. George Illawarra Dragons
231.	Michael Gordon	2010	Game 3	Penrith Panthers
232.	Jason King	2010	Game 3	Manly Warringah Sea Eagles
233.	Kade Snowden	2010	Game 3	Cronulla-Sutherland Sharks
234.	Tim Mannah	2010	Game 3	Parramatta Eels
235.	Josh Dugan	2011	Game 1	Canberra Raiders
236.	Trent Merrin	2011	Game 1	St. George Illawarra Dragons
237.	Jamie Soward	2011	Game 1	St. George Illawarra Dragons
238.	Akuila Uate	2011	Game 1	Newcastle Knights
239.	Dean Young	2011	Game 1	St. George Illawarra Dragons
240.	Will Hopoate	2011	Game 2	Manly Warringah Sea Eagles
241.	Keith Galloway	2011	Game 3	Wests Tigers
242.	Todd Carney	2012	Game 1	Cronulla-Sutherland Sharks
243.	James Tamou	2012	Game 1	North Queensland Cowboys
244.	Jamie Buhrer	2012	Game 1	Manly Warringah Sea Eagles
245.	Tony Williams	2012	Game 1	Manly Warringah Sea Eagles
246.	Tim Grant	2012	Game 2	Penrith Panthers
247.	Blake Ferguson	2013	Game 1	Canberra Raiders
248.	James Maloney	2013	Game 1	Sydney Roosters
249.	Andrew Fifita	2013	Game 1	Cronulla-Sutherland Sharks
250.	Josh Reynolds	2013	Game 2	Canterbury-Bankstown Bulldogs
251.	Nathan Merritt	2013	Game 2	South Sydney Rabbitohs
252.	Aaron Woods	2013	Game 2	Wests Tigers
253.	Boyd Cordner	2013	Game 3	Sydney Roosters
254.	Trent Hodkinson	2014	Game 1	Canterbury-Bankstown Bulldogs
255.	Daniel Tupou	2014	Game 1	Sydney Roosters
256.	Josh Jackson	2015	Game 1	Canterbury-Bankstown Bulldogs
257.	David Klemmer	2015	Game 1	Canterbury-Bankstown Bulldogs
258.	Matt Moylan	2016	Game 1	Penrith Panthers
259.	Josh Mansour	2016	Game 1	Penrith Panthers
260.	Adam Reynolds	2016	Game 1	South Sydney Rabbitohs
261.	Dylan Walker	2016	Game 1	Manly Warringah Sea Eagles
262.	Tyson Frizell	2016	Game 2	St. George Illawarra Dragons
263.	Jack Bird	2016	Game 2	Cronulla-Sutherland Sharks
264.	James Tedesco	2016	Game 3	Wests Tigers
265.	Wade Graham	2016	Game 3	Cronulla-Sutherland Sharks
266.	Nathan Peats	2017	Game 1	Gold Coast Titans
267.	Jake Trbojevic	2017	Game 1	Manly Warringah Sea Eagles
268.	Tom Trbojevic	2018	Game 1	Manly Warringah Sea Eagles
269.	Latrell Mitchell	2018	Game 1	Sydney Roosters
270.	James Roberts	2018	Game 1	Brisbane Broncos
271.	Josh Addo-Carr	2018	Game 1	Melbourne Storm
272.	Nathan Cleary	2018	Game 1	Penrith Panthers
273.	Damien Cook	2018	Game 1	South Sydney Rabbitohs
274.	Reagan Campbell-Gillard	2018	Game 1	Penrith Panthers
275.	Jack de Belin	2018	Game 1	St George Illawarra Dragons
276.	Paul Vaughan	2018	Game 1	St George Illawarra Dragons
277.	Angus Crichton	2018	Game 1	South Sydney Rabbitohs
278.	Tyrone Peachey	2018	Game 1	Penrith Panthers
279.	Matt Prior	2018	Game 2	Cronulla-Sutherland Sharks
280.	Tariq Sims	2018	Game 3	St George Illawarra Dragons
281.	Nick Cotric	2019	Game 1	Canberra Raiders
282.	Cody Walker	2019	Game 1	South Sydney Rabbitohs
283.	Jack Wighton	2019	Game 1	Canberra Raiders
284.	Payne Haas	2019	Game 1	Brisbane Broncos
285.	Cameron Murray	2019	Game 1	South Sydney Rabbitohs
286.	Daniel Saifiti	2019	Game 2	Newcastle Knights
287.	Dale Finucane	2019	Game 2	Melbourne Storm
288.	Clinton Gutherson	2020	Game 1	Parramatta Eels
289.	Luke Keary	2020	Game 1	Sydney Roosters
290.	Junior Paulo	2020	Game 1	Parramatta Eels
291.	Nathan Brown	2020	Game 2	Parramatta Eels
292.	Isaah Yeo	2020	Game 2	Penrith Panthers
293.	Jarome Luai	2021	Game 1	Penrith Panthers
294.	Brian To'o	2021	Game 1	Penrith Panthers
295.	Liam Martin	2021	Game 1	Penrith Panthers
296.	Mitchell Moses	2021	Game 3	Parramatta Eels
297.	Apisai Koroisau	2021	Game 3	Penrith Panthers
298.	Kotoni Staggs	2022	Game 1	Brisbane Broncos
299.	Stephen Crichton	2022	Game 1	Penrith Panthers
300.	Ryan Matterson	2022	Game 1	Parramatta Eels
301.	Matt Burton	2022	Game 2	Canterbury-Bankstown Bulldogs
302.	Siosifa Talakai	2022	Game 2	Cronulla-Sutherland Sharks
303.	Jacob Saifiti	2022	Game 3	Newcastle Knights
304.	Tevita Pangai Junior	2023	Game 1	Canterbury Bankstown Bulldogs
305.	Hudson Young	2023	Game 1	Canberra Raiders
306.	Nicholas Hynes	2023	Game 1	Cronulla Sutherland Sharks
307.	Stefano Utoikamanu	2023	Game 2	Wests Tigers
308.	Reece Robson	2023	Game 2	North Queensland Cowboys
309.	Bradman Best	2023	Game 3	Newcastle Knights
310.	Keaon Koloamatangi	2023	Game 3	South Sydney Rabbitohs
311.	Joseph Sua'ali'i	2024	Game 1	Sydney Roosters
312.	Zac Lomax	2024	Game 1	St George Illawarra Dragons
313.	Cameron McInnes	2024	Game 1	Cronulla-Sutherland Sharks
314.	Haumole Olakau'atu	2024	Game 1	Manly Warringah Sea Eagles
315.	Spencer Leniu	2024	Game 1	Sydney Roosters
316.	Dylan Edwards	2024	Game 2	Penrith Panthers
317.	Connor Watson	2024	Game 2	Sydney Roosters
318.	Mitchell Barnett	2024	Game 3	New Zealand Warriors
319.	Max King	2025	Game 1	Canterbury Bankstown Bulldogs
320.	Toluta'u Koula	2026	Game 1	Manly Warringah Sea Eagles
321.	Addin Fonua-Blake	2026	Game 1	Cronulla-Sutherland Sharks
322.	Victor Radley	2026	Game 1	Sydney Roosters
323.	Blayke Brailey	2026	Game 1	Cronulla-Sutherland Sharks
324.	Ethan Strange	2026	Game 1	Canberra Raiders
325.	Casey McLean	2026	Game 1	Penrith Panthers
326.	Mark Nawaqanitawase	2026	Game 2	Sydney Roosters
327.	Dylan Lucas	2026	Game 2	Newcastle Knights
328.	Jack Bostock	2026	Game 3	Dolphins

=== Under-20s ===
Cap no.	Name	Debut year	Club	Appearances	Tries	Goals	Field goals	Points
1.	Cheyse Blair	2012	Parramatta Eels	1	0	0	0	0
2.	Shannon Boyd	2012	Canberra Raiders	1	0	0	0	0
3.	Paul Carter	2012	Canterbury-Bankstown Bulldogs	1	0	0	0	0
4.	Boyd Cordner	2012	Sydney Roosters	1	0	0	0	0
5.	Evander Cummins	2012	St. George Illawarra Dragons	1	0	0	0	0
6.	Kane Evans	2012	Sydney Roosters	1	1	0	0	4
7.	Matt Groat	2012	Wests Tigers	1	0	0	0	0
8.	David Klemmer	2012	Canterbury-Bankstown Bulldogs	2	0	0	0	0
9.	Michael Lichaa	2012	Cronulla-Sutherland Sharks	2	1	0	0	4
10.	Chanel Mata'utia	2012	Newcastle Knights	1	1	0	0	4
11.	Alex McKinnon	2012	Newcastle Knights	1	0	0	0	0
12.	Jacob Miller	2012	Wests Tigers	1	0	0	0	0
13.	Ed Murphy	2012	Canterbury-Bankstown Bulldogs	1	0	0	0	0
14.	Harry Siejka	2012	Penrith Panthers	1	1	3	0	10
15.	Jack Stockwell	2012	St. George Illawarra Dragons	1	0	0	0	0
16.	Vaipuna Tia Kilifi	2012	Penrith Panthers	1	0	0	0	0
17.	Young Tonumaipea	2012	Melbourne Storm	1	0	0	0	0
18.	Dean Britt	2013	Melbourne Storm	2	0	0	0	0
19.	Luke Brooks	2013	Wests Tigers	1	0	0	0	0
20.	Mitch Cornish	2013	Canberra Raiders	1	2	0	0	8
21.	Craig Garvey	2013	St. George Illawarra Dragons	1	0	0	0	0
22.	Clinton Gutherson	2013	Manly Warringah Sea Eagles	2	0	5	0	10
23.	George Jennings	2013	Penrith Panthers	1	2	0	0	8
24.	Matthew Lodge	2013	Melbourne Storm	2	0	0	0	0
25.	Kyle Lovett	2013	Wests Tigers	1	0	0	0	0
26.	Junior Paulo	2013	Parramatta Eels	1	0	0	0	0
27.	Charly Runciman	2013	St. George Illawarra Dragons	1	2	0	0	8
28.	Brenden Santi	2013	Wests Tigers	1	0	0	0	0
29.	Kelepi Tanginoa	2013	Parramatta Eels	1	0	0	0	0
30.	Vai Toutai	2013	Parramatta Eels	1	0	0	0	0
31.	Jake Trbojevic	2013	Manly Warringah Sea Eagles	2	0	0	0	0
32.	Dylan Walker	2013	South Sydney Rabbitohs	1	0	4	0	8
33.	Jack Bird	2014	St. George Illawarra Dragons	1	0	0	0	0
34.	Adam Elliott	2014	Canterbury-Bankstown Bulldogs	1	0	0	0	0
35.	Aaron Gray	2014	South Sydney Rabbitohs	1	0	0	0	0
36.	Drew Hutchison	2014	St. George Illawarra Dragons	2	0	0	0	0
37.	Rhys Kennedy	2014	Melbourne Storm	1	0	0	0	0
38.	Jake Mamo	2014	Newcastle Knights	1	3	0	0	12
39.	Jakiel Mariner	2014	Sydney Roosters	1	0	0	0	0
40.	Sione Mata'utia	2014	Newcastle Knights	1	1	0	0	4
41.	Ryan Matterson	2014	Parramatta Eels	1	0	0	0	0
42.	Mitchell Moses	2014	Wests Tigers	1	0	0	0	0
43.	Pauli Pauli	2014	Parramatta Eels	1	0	0	0	0
44.	Tyrone Phillips	2014	Canterbury-Bankstown Bulldogs	1	1	0	0	4
45.	Kaysa Pritchard	2014	Parramatta Eels	1	0	0	0	0
46.	Oliver Clark	2015	Penrith Panthers	2	0	0	0	0
47.	Addison Demetriou	2015	Manly Warringah Sea Eagles	1	0	0	0	0
48.	Tyrell Fuimaono	2015	Parramatta Eels	2	0	0	0	0
49.	Grant Garvey	2015	Sydney Roosters	2	0	0	0	0
50.	Jackson Hastings	2015	Sydney Roosters	1	1	4	0	12
51.	Robert Jennings	2015	Penrith Panthers	1	0	0	0	0
52.	Brian Kelly	2015	Gold Coast Titans	2	4	0	0	16
53.	Liam Knight	2015	Manly Warringah Sea Eagles	1	0	0	0	0
54.	Jacob Liddle	2015	Wests Tigers	1	0	0	0	0
55.	Latrell Mitchell	2015	Sydney Roosters	1	1	0	0	4
56.	Brent Naden	2015	Penrith Panthers	1	0	0	0	0
57.	John Olive	2015	South Sydney Rabbitohs	1	0	0	0	0
58.	Hame Sele	2015	St. George Illawarra Dragons	1	0	0	0	0
59.	Joe Stimson	2015	Melbourne Storm	1	0	0	0	0
60.	Alex Twal	2015	Parramatta Eels	2	0	0	0	0
61.	Luke Yates	2015	Newcastle Knights	1	0	0	0	0
62.	Nat Butcher	2016	Sydney Roosters	1	0	0	0	0
63.	Jack Cogger	2016	Newcastle Knights	1	0	0	0	0
64.	Tevita Cottrell	2016	South Sydney Rabbitohs	1	0	0	0	0
65.	Lachlan Croker	2016	Canberra Raiders	1	0	0	0	0
66.	Cory Denniss	2016	Newcastle Knights	1	0	0	0	0
67.	Matt Dufty	2016	St. George Illawarra Dragons	1	0	0	0	0
68.	Max Elliott	2016	Brisbane Broncos	1	0	0	0	0
69.	Reuben Garrick	2016	St. George Illawarra Dragons	1	0	0	0	0
70.	Taniela Paseka	2016	Wests Tigers	1	0	0	0	0
71.	Curtis Scott	2016	Melbourne Storm	1	0	0	0	0
72.	Bayley Sironen	2016	Wests Tigers	1	0	0	0	0
73.	Zac Woolford	2016	Canberra Raiders	1	0	0	0	0

== See also ==
- List of Queensland State of Origin players
