= Sigsworth =

Sigsworth is a surname. Notable people with the surname include:

- Guy Sigsworth (born 1960), British composer, producer and songwriter
- Jessica Sigsworth (born 1994), English footballer
- Phil Sigsworth (born 1959), Australian rugby league footballer
- Ron Sigsworth (1961–2025), Australian rugby league footballer
