= 1982 State of Origin series =

Australian rugby league series

- Won by: Queensland (1st series title)
- Series margin: 2–1
- Points scored: 69
- Attendance: 67,003 (ave. 22,334 per match)
- Top points scorer(s): Mal Meninga (12)
- Top try scorer(s): Ziggy Niszczot & Brad Izzard; John Ribot (2)

The 1982 State of Origin series was the first annual three-match series for rugby league between New South Wales and Queensland to be played entirely under "state of origin" selection rules. After the matches in 1980 and 1981 that trialed the concept, 'Origin' was fully embraced in 1982, with no matches using the previous seventy-four years' residential-based selection rules ever played again.

The series came down to the deciding third match, which a mistake-riddled New South Wales lost to a more professional Queensland.

== Game I ==
In preparation for the first ever full State of Origin series, the Blues were afforded a two-and-a-half-week preparation under New South Wales' coach Frank Stanton, including time spent training for the annual City vs Country Origin match. Maroons coach Artie Beetson however had only four days to build a team out of his men as Sydney clubs refused to release their players from club duties the weekend before game one. This would lead the QRL to demand more of their players' time to prepare for State of Origin fixtures.

Tuesday, 1st June 1982
8:00 PM

| Queensland | 16-20 | New South Wales |
|---|---|---|
| Tries: Brennan; Ribot; Goals: Meninga 5/6 | | Tries: Niszczot (2); Izzard; Mortimer; Goals: Cronin 4/5 |

Lang Park, Brisbane
Attendance: 27,326
Referee: Kevin Roberts
Player of the Match: Mal Meninga

New South Wales, captained for the first time by Manly-Warringah hooker Max Krilich who got the job ahead of Parramatta lock Ray Price, won their first Origin match in game I of the 1982 series at Lang Park 20–16, inspired by a fine display from halfback Steve Mortimer but not before resisting another valiant comeback by Queensland. The Blues led 17-6 and appeared to be coasting toward a comfortable victory until centre Mal Meninga – who achieved the rare feat of winning the man-of-the-match award from a losing side – cut a swathe through the New South Wales defence. His destructive bursts led to tries for winger John Ribot and centre Mitch Brennan which cut the Blues’ lead to one point. Mortimer laid on a late try for Penrith's powerful young replacement back Brad Izzard to lift the Blues to a 20–16 lead and the Maroons were then required to battle desperately to hold their line intact for the final minutes. Fullback Greg Brentnall kept the scores tight when he leapt spectacularly to claim a Queensland bomb a minute from full-time.

== Game II ==
For game II, also played at Lang Park, the Maroons made several changes as they tried to keep the series alive. Meninga was sidelined with a shoulder injury, opening the way for the debut of Gene Miles who would go on to star in 20 Origins for Queensland throughout the 1980s and would form a regular Australian Test side pairing with his Origin opposite Brett Kenny, who would debut in the next game.

Maroons coach Arthur Beetson sprang a late surprise when he replaced Manly-Warringah second-rower Paul Vautin, who made his Australian debut a month later in the test series against New Zealand, in the starting line-up with veteran front-rower Rod Morris. Morris had played only a handful of club games for Wynnum-Manly after emerging from retirement, but Beetson's move proved a masterstroke.

Tuesday, 8 June 1982

| Queensland | 11–7 | New South Wales |
|---|---|---|
| (3 - 1 t) John Ribot (3 - 1 t) Gene Miles (3 - 1 t) Paul Vautin (2 - 1 g) Colin Scott | (Report) | Brad Izzard (3 - 1 t); Tony Melrose (4 - 2 g) |

Lang Park
Attendance: 19,435
Referee: Barry Gomersall
Player of the Match: Rod Morris

The Queensland plan was to bustle the Blues out of the contest and they were aided in this by Qld referee Barry Gomersall making his own Origin debut and allowing the Maroons enormous latitude in the tackles.

With Morris leading from the front in a man-of-the-match winning performance, Queensland ground New South Wales out of the contest, scoring three tries to one to win 11–7. Miles scored the first try when he ran over the top of Blues fullback Greg Brentnall. The Maroons led 8-7 before Vautin sealed the result with a late try scored after second-rower Rohan Hancock punched a hole in the Blues defence close to the line.

Queensland's win in game 2 ensured that the third game would also be played under Origin rules. According to some reports, had NSW wrapped up the series in the second game, the third game in Sydney would have reverted to the old State of Residence rules and would most likely have been played at Leichhardt Oval instead of on the hallowed turf of the Sydney Cricket Ground.

== Game III ==
The first three-match series came down to a Game III decider to be played at the Sydney Cricket Ground, the first time the Maroons had played at the ground since 1976. The attendance of 20,242 was the largest for an interstate game in Sydney since 1973 when 19,049 saw NSW defeat Qld 26-0 (reports at the time said NSWRL officials would have been happy if they got 20,000 to Origin's first game in Sydney after years of sub 5,000 crowds for interstate games at Leichhardt Oval). Officiated by a neutral referee – New Zealander Don Wilson, it was the first State of Origin match to be played in Sydney, and for the players, test positions in the Australian team for the upcoming series against New Zealand hung in the balance.

I cannot imagine any match having more appeal than this in the rugby league calendar. If ever the resistance by fans to representative matches in Sydney is to be broken down, this will be the match to do it.

— Frank Hyde, 15 June 1982

The Blues made wholesale changes and among the new faces were Brett Kenny at five-eighth in place of Manly's Alan Thompson, Canterbury centre Phil Sigsworth at fullback, and virtual unknown Moree Boomerangs winger Phillip Duke who had starred for NSW Country in the annual City vs Country Origin match in Sydney, despite City winning the game 47–3.

Tuesday, 22 June 1982

| Queensland | 10–5 | New South Wales |
|---|---|---|
| (4 - 2 g) Mal Meninga (3 - 1 t) Rohan Hancock (3 - 1 t) Wally Lewis | (Report) | Phillip Duke (3 - 1 t); Mick Cronin (2 - 1 g) |

Sydney Cricket Ground
Attendance: 20,242
Referee: Don Wilson (New Zealand)
Player of the Match: Wally Lewis

Duke and Sigsworth were involved in one of the most memorable bungles in State of Origin history. With the series poised on a knife's edge and the score at 5-all, Sigsworth scrambled to field a Lewis kick in the Blues in-goal. Trapped by Second-rower Paul McCabe, Sigsworth threw a pass to Duke who fumbled the ball, and Wally Lewis dived on it for a try that rocked the Blues. However, Qld should not have had the ball at all at that stage. Referee Wilson had penalised Blues halfback Steve Mortimer for a second-row scrum feed 10 metres out from the Maroons try line. In a complete foul-up, Wilson had somehow penalised the wrong man as it was actually Qld halfback Mark Murray who had fed the scrum. When Motrimer protested his innocence, Wilson then marched the Blues 10 metres downfield for backchat. It was at the end of the following set of tackles where Lewis put in his kick leading to the Blues fateful fumble. Blues coach Stanton however refused to blame Wilson for the error, or lay blame with Sigsworth and Duke, instead claiming that errors throughout the game had cost NSW victory. Incredibly, NSW failed to complete 27 sets of 6 tackles during the game, often handing Qld the ball in an attacking position.

Queensland went on to win 10–5, claiming the first three-match series 2–1 and their first interstate series win over New South Wales since 1960. Lewis won the first of his record total of eight man-of-the-match awards and beginning a run of five Origin best player awards in six games.

== New South Wales squads ==
| Position | Game I | Game II | Game III |
|---|---|---|---|
| Fullback | Greg Brentnall | | Phil Sigsworth |
| Wing | Chris Anderson | Ziggy Niszczot | Phillip Duke |
| Centre | Mick Cronin | Steve Rogers | Brad Izzard |
| Centre | Steve Rogers | Brad Izzard | Mick Cronin |
| Wing | Ziggy Niszczot | Tony Melrose | Terry Fahey |
| Five-eighth | Alan Thompson | | Brett Kenny |
| Halfback | Steve Mortimer | | |
| Prop | John Coveney | | Don McKinnon |
| Hooker | Max Krilich (c) | | |
| Prop | Craig Young | | Royce Ayliffe |
| Second Row | Tony Rampling | John Muggleton | Paul Merlo |
| Second Row | John Muggleton | Tony Rampling | Les Boyd |
| Lock | Ray Price | | |
| Replacement | Brad Izzard | Brett Kenny | Alan Thompson |
| Replacement | Royce Ayliffe | | Craig Young |
| Coach | Frank Stanton | | |

== Queensland squads ==
The 21 players selected by Queensland:

| Position | Game I | Game II | Game III |
|---|---|---|---|
| Fullback | Colin Scott | | Mitch Brennan |
| Wing | John Ribot | | |
| Centre | Mitch Brennan | | Gene Miles |
| Centre | Mal Meninga | Graham Quinn | Mal Meninga |
| Wing | Kerry Boustead | Brad Backer | Kerry Boustead |
| Five-eighth | Wally Lewis (c) | | |
| Halfback | Mark Murray | | |
| Prop | Rohan Hancock | | Rod Morris |
| Hooker | John Dowling | | |
| Prop | Paul Khan | | |
| Second Row | Bruce Walker | Rod Morris | Rohan Hancock |
| Second Row | Paul McCabe | | |
| Lock | Paul Vautin | Norm Carr | |
| Replacement | Bob Kellaway | Greg Holben | Tony Currie |
| Replacement | Gene Miles | Paul Vautin | |
| Coach | Arthur Beetson | | |

== Sources ==
- Big League's 25 Years of Origin Collectors' Edition, News Magazines, Surry Hills, Sydney
