= Greg Holben =

Australian rugby league player

Personal information
- Born: 3 August 1951 (age 74)

Playing information
- Position: Five-eighth
Club
Years	Team	Pld	T	G	FG	P
	Easts (Brisbane)
	Brothers (Brisbane)
	Total	0	0	0	0	0
Representative
Years	Team	Pld	T	G	FG	P
1982	Queensland	1	0	0	0	0

Greg Holben is an Australian former professional rugby league footballer who played in the 1970s and 1980s. A Queensland State of Origin representative utility back, he played his in the Brisbane Rugby League for the Eastern Suburbs (winning the 1977 and 1978 grand finals with them) and Brothers clubs.

== Playing career ==
An Eastern Suburbs junior, Holben was also a goal-kicker. He played for the first grade side that reached the 1976 Brisbane Rugby League season's grand final but lost to Western Suburbs. Holebn was in the Easts team that won the 1977 Brisbane Rugby League season's Grand Final, kicking four goals. He scored the dramatic last-minute try to win the 1978 Brisbane Rugby League season's Grand Final for Easts.

Holben was selected for Queensland as a reserve in Game II of the 1982 State of Origin series. During the 1982 New Zealand rugby league tour of Australia and Papua New Guinea Holben was selected to play for Queensland against the Kiwis in Brisbane.

== Post-playing ==
Holben took up coaching after retiring from the playing field and later became the Chairman of Selectors at the Eastern Suburbs Tigers, a position he held for several years.

The Easts Tigers club celebrated its 75th birthday reunion by naming an all-star 25 at an "outstanding" dinner in 2008, which included Holben.
