= Ron Sigsworth =

Australian rugby league footballer (1961–2025)

Personal information
- Full name: Ronald Andrew Sigsworth
- Born: 31 August 1961; Sydney, New South Wales, Australia
- Died: 28 April 2025 (aged 63)

Playing information
- Position: Fullback, Centre
Club
Years	Team	Pld	T	G	FG	P
1982–83	Newtown Jets	25	11	1	0	42
1984	Canberra Raiders	13	3	0	0	12
1984–86	Castleford	28	11	0	0	44
	Total	66	25	1	0	98
- Source: As of 4 June 2019
- Relatives: Phil Sigsworth (brother)

Ronald Andrew Sigsworth (31 August 1961 – 28 April 2025) was an Australian rugby league footballer who played in the 1980s. He played for the Newtown Jets and the Canberra Raiders in the New South Wales Rugby League (NSWRL) competition and for Castleford in England.

== Background ==
Ron Sigsworth was born on 31 August 1961, and died on 28 April 2025, at the age of 63. He was the brother of former Newtown team of the century member Phil Sigsworth.

== Playing career ==
Sigsworth made his first grade debut for Newtown in Round 2, 1982 against South Sydney Rabbitohs at Redfern Oval which ended in a 30–0 defeat. Sigsworth would go on to score four tries in six games for Newtown in his first season.

Sigsworth played 19 games for Newtown in 1983 which would prove to be the club's last in the top grade of Australian rugby league. Sigsworth scored Newtown's last try in the top grade at Henson Park which was against Balmain in Round 23 1983. The match was also Sigsworth's last for the club. Newtown's final match in the NSWRL premiership was a 9–6 victory over the Canberra Raiders at Campbelltown Stadium.

Following Newtown's exclusion from the premiership due to financial reasons, Sigsworth signed with Canberra in 1984. Sigsworth made 13 appearances for Canberra in his only year at the club.

Sigsworth then headed to England and signed with Castleford. Sigsworth played two seasons at Castleford and scored 11 tries in 28 games.
