= Brian Johnston (rugby league) =

Australia international rugby league player (born 1958)

Personal information
- Full name: Brian Stuart Johnston
- Born: 13 November 1958 (age 68) Dunedoo, Australia

Playing information
- Height: 183 cm (6 ft 0 in)
- Weight: 83 kg (13 st 1 lb)
- Position: Centre, Wing
Club
| Years | Team | Pld | T | G | FG | P |
|---|---|---|---|---|---|---|
| 1980–89 | St. George Dragons | 167 | 61 | 0 | 0 | 233 |
Representative
| Years | Team | Pld | T | G | FG | P |
| 1978–88 | Country Firsts/Origin | 4 | 1 | 0 | 0 | 4 |
| 1984–89 | New South Wales | 8 | 2 | 0 | 0 | 8 |
| 1987 | Australia | 1 | 0 | 0 | 0 | 0 |

Brian Stuart Johnston (born 13 November 1958 in Dunedoo, New South Wales) is an Australian former rugby league footballer and administrator. He played with the St George Dragons and represented for the Australian national rugby league team on one occasion. Johnston's position of choice was centre but his speed also saw him play on the wing, especially in representative teams.

== Career ==
An athletic speedster who played Colts for Eastern Suburbs RUFC while studying at the Institute of Technology in Sydney, Johnston signed with St George in 1980 and played for New South Wales in the State of Origin series. He represented in the centres or at wing for the Blues in all three games of the 1987 State of Origin series plus the 4th 'exhibition' game played in Los Angeles. He was also selected for one game in the 1984, 1985 and 1986 Origin series. After missing the 1988 series, Johnston was recalled for Game 3 of the 1989 State of Origin series in what would be his final representative appearance.

Injury caused Johnston to miss a place in St. George's 1985 Grand Final side which went down 6–7 to the Canterbury-Bankstown Bulldogs, although he did play in the reserve grade grand final win against Canberra. Johnston was considered unlucky not to tour with the 1986 Kangaroos.

Brian Johnston played his international debut test for Australia in 1987.

Johnston received the St George captaincy in 1989 but retired at the beginning of the 1990 season because of injury.

He was awarded Life Membership of the St. George Dragons club in 1990.

== Administrative career ==
After retiring from football, Brian Johnston moved into administration and was appointed chief executive officer (CEO) of the St George Dragons in 1996. In 1999, he was named Australian Test manager for the ANZAC Test, working alongside national coach Wayne Bennett and senior team officials. During his tenure, he drew criticism for his handling of the disciplinary sacking of Craig Gower for misconduct in the lead-up to the match.

Johnston returned to the club in a second stint as chief executive officer (CEO) of the St George Illawarra Dragons in 2018, following a period of organisational restructuring and the club’s transition to 50% ownership by WIN Corporation. A former Dragons player and chairman, he led the club through a challenging 15-month period. In 2020, Johnston announced his departure, stepping down to focus on his family and his farm - beyond his professional career, Johnston has two daughters

== Sources ==
Encyclopedia of Rugby League Players, St George/Illawarra edition, Alan Whiticker & Glen Hudson
