= Adam Muir =

Australia international rugby league footballer

Personal information
- Born: 7 December 1971 (age 54) Belmont, New South Wales, Australia

Playing information
- Height: 187 cm (6 ft 2 in)
- Weight: 102 kg (16 st 1 lb)
- Position: Second-row, Lock
Club
Years	Team	Pld	T	G	FG	P
1992–97	Newcastle Knights	101	29	0	0	116
1998–99	North Sydney Bears	24	9	0	0	36
2000–01	Northern Eagles	45	12	0	0	48
2002	South Sydney	16	0	0	0	0
	Total	186	50	0	0	200
Representative
Years	Team	Pld	T	G	FG	P
1995–96	Country Origin	2	0	0	0	0
1995–01	New South Wales	13	2	0	0	8
1995–96	Australia	3	1	0	0	4

Adam Muir (born 7 December 1971) is an Australian former rugby league footballer who played in the 1990s and 2000s. An Australian international and New South Wales State of Origin representative forward, he played his club football with the Newcastle Knights (with whom he won the 1997 Premiership), North Sydney Bears, Northern Eagles and the South Sydney Rabbitohs.

== Background ==
Muir was born in Belmont, New South Wales, Australia.

== Club career ==
A Lakes United junior, Muir was graded with the Knights in 1992 and spent five years there and played 99 games. He debuted in first grade in May 1992 but did not cement a regular top-grade spot until round 7 in the 1993 season. He was member of the 1997 premiership winning side and bowed out of the club on a high having announced during the 1997 season, his intention to join the North Sydney Bears.

His two seasons at Norths were plagued with ankle and knee injuries and his cause was not helped when he clashed with coach Peter Louis after being fined for misbehaviour after a pre-season match in Wagga in early 1999. He was a major signing of the merged Northern Eagles in 2000 and made a return to State of Origin honors following good club form that year. After two seasons in which the Northern Eagles merger was wracked by internal strife and poor team performances, he signed on to captain the South Sydney Rabbitohs on their return to the NRL in 2002. Although signed to a two-season contract, injury forced him into retirement in 2003.

== Representative career ==
After representing for Country Origin he first represented for New South Wales at State of Origin during the troubled 1995 season where he played in all three games. He made his first appearance in the run-on side in game III at second-row. He made nine consecutive appearances for the Blues from game I 1995 to game III of 1997 until his position was challenged by his Northern Eagles club-mate Nik Kosef and his long-term representative peer and rival David Barnhill. After a two-year absence from Origin he returned to the Blues side for games II and III of both the 2001 and 2002 series.

Muir made his international representative debut as a reserve in the opening match of the 1995 trans-Tasman series against New Zealand. He was a late withdrawal from the second Test line-up because of illness, but was selected in Australia's World Cup squad at the end of year. In that tournament in England he played in one Test, against South Africa. His final international Test appearance was against Fiji in 1996 which Australia won 84–14.

== Other honours ==
In 1997 Muir was named in the Newcastle Knights Team of the Decade and again, in 2007, in the Team of the Era.

== External sources ==
- Big League's 25 Years of Origin Collectors' Edition, News Magazines, Surry Hills, Sydney
- Whiticker, Alan & Hudson, Glen (2006) The Encyclopedia of Rugby League Players, Gary Allen Publishing, Sydney
