= Phillip Duke =

Australian rugby league footballer

Phil Duke
Personal information
- Full name: Phillip Duke
- Born: 14 March 1960 (age 66)

Playing information
- Position: Wing
Club
Years	Team	Pld	T	G	FG	P
	Moree Boomerangs
1987–1988	Western Suburbs	27	7	0	0	28
	Total	27	7	0	0	28
Representative
Years	Team	Pld	T	G	FG	P
1982	Country Origin	1	1	0	0	3
1982	New South Wales	1	1	0	0	3

Phillip Duke (born 14 March 1960) is a former professional rugby league footballer who was selected to represent the New South Wales Blues in game III of the 1982 State of Origin series.

Duke, playing for the Moree Boomerangs, was the first of three players in the Country Rugby League who were selected to play Origin without having played in first-grade competition (then the New South Wales Rugby League). Duke earned his selection after playing for Country in the annual City vs Country confrontation and he was placed on the wing for the third and deciding match of the Origin series. Although he scored the only New South Wales try in the game, Duke's performance was marred by a missed pass from Phil Sigsworth. The ball intended for Duke went astray and Queenslander Wally Lewis scooped it up, scored a try and won the game and the series for Queensland.

Duke later played two seasons with Western Suburbs Magpies, mainly as a winger.
