= Sydney Institute of Business and Technology =

- Location: Sydney North Ryde/Macquarie Park, New South Wales, Australia
- Colours: Green
- Website: SIBT website

Sydney Institute of Business and Technology (SIBT) offers Foundation Studies (Pre-University) and University-level Diplomas. Upon successful completion of a SIBT Diploma, students enter the appropriate bachelor's degree as a second year student. Over 20,000 SIBT graduates have successfully gone on to graduate since 1996.
