= Paul Field (rugby league) =

Australian rugby league footballer and administrator

Personal information
- Full name: Paul Field

Playing information
- Position: Hooker
Club
Years	Team	Pld	T	G	FG	P
	Cootamundra
Representative
Years	Team	Pld	T	G	FG	P
1983	New South Wales	2	0	0	0	0

Paul Field is an Australian former rugby league footballer who played in the 1980s. He played for the New South Wales Blues, primarily as a hooker.

Field was selected to represent New South Wales directly from the New South Wales Country Rugby League, one of only three players to be selected straight from a country club to play for the Blues. Field played for Cootamundra and was selected for games II and III of the 1983 State of Origin series.

Field is still involved with rugby league and is currently president of the Group 9 Cootamundra Bulldogs.
