= John Ferguson (rugby league) =

Australia international rugby league footballer

Personal information
- Born: 15 July 1954 (age 72) Sydney, New South Wales, Australia

Playing information
- Height: 173 cm (5 ft 8 in)
- Weight: 72 kg (11 st 5 lb)
- Position: Wing
Club
Years	Team	Pld	T	G	FG	P
1980–83	Newtown Jets	74	40	0	0	135
1984–85	Eastern Suburbs	31	16	0	0	64
1984–85	Wigan	25	24	0	0	96
1986–90	Canberra Raiders	94	50	0	0	200
	Total	224	130	0	0	495
Representative
Years	Team	Pld	T	G	FG	P
1985–89	New South Wales	8	1	0	0	4
1985	Australia	3	0	0	0	0

John "Chicka" Ferguson (born 15 July 1954) is an Australian former professional rugby league footballer who played in the 1980s. An Australian international and New South Wales State of Origin representative winger, in the New South Wales Rugby League premiership for the Newtown Jets, Eastern Suburbs Roosters and finally the Canberra Raiders, with whom he won the 1989 and 1990 NSWRL premierships. A prolific try-scorer, who topped the NSWRL's scoring list in 1988, Ferguson also played in England with Wigan, helping them to victory in the 1985 Challenge Cup Final. He has since been named in Australia's indigenous team of the century (1908–2008).

== Playing career ==
Ferguson played at South Grafton Rebels as a junior and then as a first grader from 1972 to 1975. He then moved to play at Glen Innes from 1976 to 1980. He was then lured to play for Newtown Jets for the 1981 season.

Ferguson played in his first Grand Final with Newtown in 1981 before moving to Easts. He later moved to England, playing the 1984–85 season for Wigan. His stint in Lancashire saw him explode on the league scene, scoring 24 tries in 25 games and catching the eye of Australian selectors. John Ferguson played on the wing in Wigan's 18–26 defeat by St. Helens in the 1984 Lancashire Cup Final during the 1984–85 season at Central Park, Wigan, on Sunday 28 October 1984, and played on the wing and scored 2-tries in Wigan's 28–24 victory over Hull F.C. in the 1985 Challenge Cup Final during the 1984–85 season at Wembley Stadium, London on Saturday 4 May 1985. Despite the Challenge Cup Final at the time conflicting with the start of the NSWRL season, Ferguson flew across the world to score two tries before 99,801 spectators in what has been described as the greatest Cup Final in history.

Ferguson would later return to the NSWRL, topping the League's try-scoring list in 1988 before going on to feature in two premiership-winning Canberra Raiders sides. In the famous '89 grand final, he scored a dramatic last-minute try to send the rugby league grand final into extra time. The Canberra Raiders eventually triumphed over the Balmain Tigers. In the post season he traveled with the Raiders to England for the 1989 World Club Challenge, playing on the wing in Canberra's loss to Widnes.

Ferguson, still one of the fastest players at the Raiders despite turning 36 during the season, won a second premiership with the Canberra Raiders in the 1990 NSWRL season.

== Representative career ==
Ferguson was selected to represent New South Wales as a winger in three State of Origin series:

- Games I, II and III of the 1985 State of Origin series
- Games II and III of the 1988 State of Origin series
- Games I, II and III of the 1989 State of Origin series

Ferguson is the oldest player to have participated in a New South Wales State of Origin team – 34 years and 348 days.

== Awards ==
In 2001, Ferguson was named on the wing of the Indigenous Team of the Century. Arthur Beetson, named as captain of the team, commented that "Chicka was as good a winger as anybody".

Ferguson was again listed in a top Indigenous players team in 2004 when the Canberra Raiders selected a side representing the best Aboriginal and Torres Strait Islanders to have played for the club.
