= Jamie Ainscough =

Australia international rugby league footballer

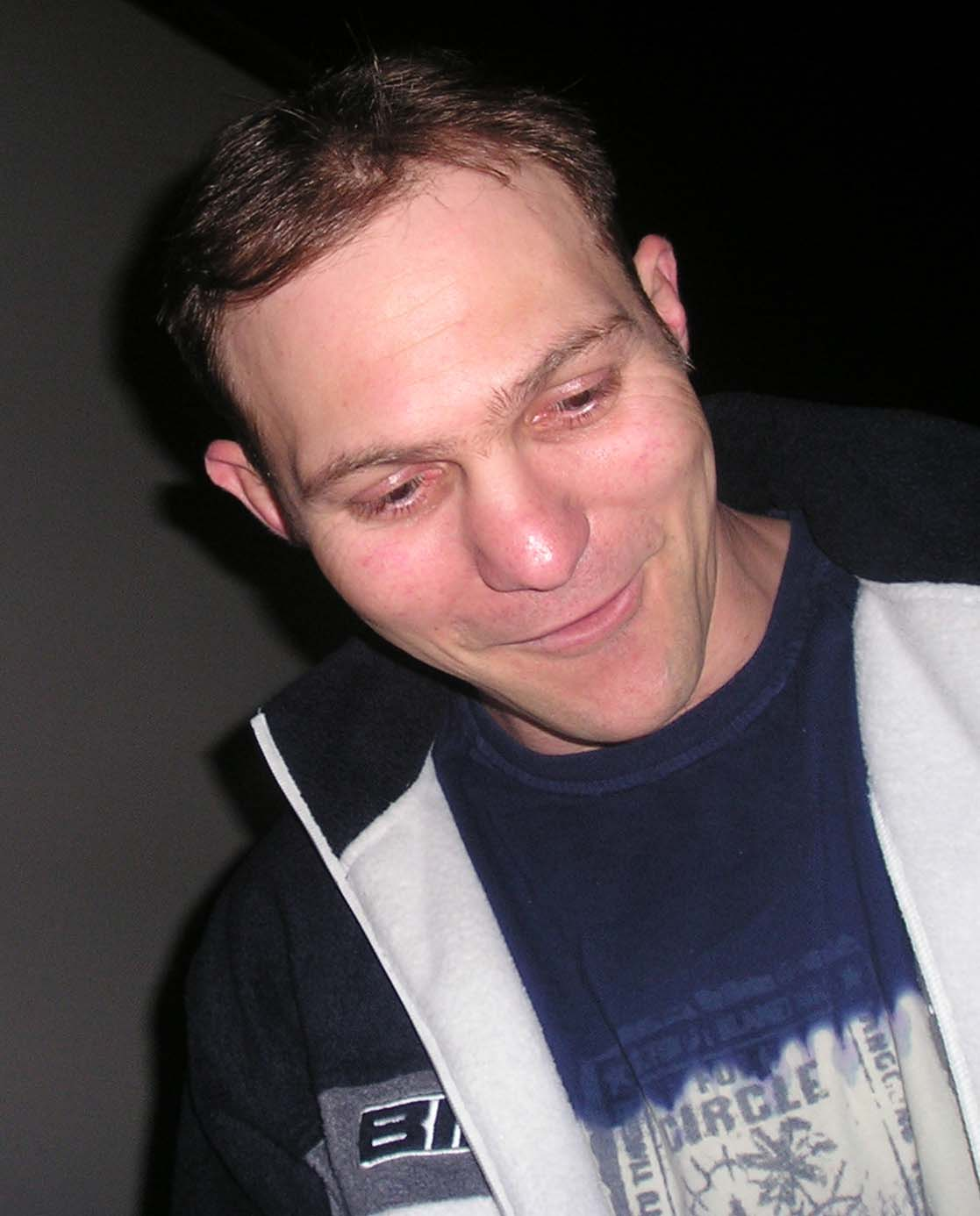
- Ainscough in 2008

Personal information
- Born: 20 July 1972 (age 53) Sydney, New South Wales, Australia

Playing information
- Height: 186 cm (6 ft 1 in)
- Weight: 93 kg (14 st 9 lb; 205 lb)
- Position: Wing, Centre
Club
Years	Team	Pld	T	G	FG	P
1990–91	Western Suburbs	35	14	0	0	56
1992–96	Newcastle Knights	87	47	4	2	198
1997–98	St George Dragons	37	8	0	2	34
1999–01	St George Illawarra	69	25	2	0	104
2002–03	Wigan Warriors	39	23	0	0	94
	Total	267	117	6	4	486
Representative
Years	Team	Pld	T	G	FG	P
1996–01	New South Wales	12	2	0	0	8
1995	Australia	1	1	0	0	4
1995–96	NSW City	2	1	0	0	4

Jamie Ainscough (born 20 July 1972) is an Australian former professional rugby league footballer who played in the 1990s and 2000s. An Australia international and New South Wales State of Origin representative three-quarter back, he played his club football for Western Suburbs, the Newcastle Knights, the St. George Illawarra Dragons and the Wigan Warriors (with whom he won the 2002 Challenge Cup).

== Background ==
Born in Sydney, Ainscough played for the Macquarie Cobras J.R.L.F.C in Cartwright, New South Wales. While attending Elderslie High School, Ainscough played for the Australian Schoolboys team in 1989.

== Playing career ==
=== 1990s ===
The following year he was playing first grade in the New South Wales Rugby League premiership for Western Suburbs. Ainscough also played 87 games with the Newcastle Knights from 1992 to 1996. He made one international appearance for Australia against New Zealand in the 3rd Test of 1995 Brisbane. In that game Ainscough came on as a replacement and scored a try. Ainscough represented the New South Wales Rugby League team in the State of Origin series in 12 games between 1996 and 2001 (three as a replacement). Ainscough joined St George in 1997 and played on the wing in the 1999 NRL Grand Final loss against the Melbourne Storm. St. George led 14-nil at half time but were run down by Melbourne. The illegal tackle he made on Craig Smith resulted in a penalty try contributing to St. George losing the premiership.

=== 2000s ===
On 24 October 2000, Ainscough was awarded the Australian Sports Medal for his achievements. He played 106 games with St George or the merged St George Illawarra Dragons up until 2001 at centre or wing. Ainscough concluded his career in the Super League with English side the Wigan Warriors in 2002 when they won the Challenge Cup. He played in a Wigan Warriors team studded with Australians in Brett Dallas, Julian O'Neill, Adrian Lam, Craig Smith, David Furner and coached by Stuart Raper. Following that season he went close to needing to have his arm amputated following an infection that was found to have been caused after one of St. Helens centre Martin Gleeson's teeth was left embedded in Ainscough's arm.

== Sources ==
- Andrews, Malcolm (2006) The ABC of Rugby League Austn Broadcasting Corpn, Sydney
- Whiticker, Alan & Hudson, Glen (2006) The Encyclopedia of Rugby League Players, Gavin Allen Publishing, Sydney
- State of Origin Official website Rugby League Player Stats
