= Tony Rampling =

Australian rugby league footballer

Personal information
- Full name: Tony Rampling
- Born: 25 October 1961 (age 64)

Playing information
- Position: Second-row, Prop
Club
Years	Team	Pld	T	G	FG	P
1981–86	South Sydney	68	3	0	0	9
1987	Eastern Suburbs	9	1	0	0	4
1988	Gold Coast	1	0	0	0	0
1989–90	Salford	26	2	0	0	8
1991–92	Western Suburbs	15	1	0	0	4
	Total	119	7	0	0	25
Representative
Years	Team	Pld	T	G	FG	P
1982–85	New South Wales	3	0	0	0	0
- Source: As of 1 February 2019

Tony Rampling (born 25 October 1961) is an Australian former professional rugby league footballer who played in the New South Wales Rugby League. During his career he played for the South Sydney Rabbitohs (two spells), Eastern Suburbs, Gold Coast Chargers, Salford City Reds and the Western Suburbs Magpies.

In 1982, Rampling was selected to represent New South Wales as a second-rower for games I and II of the 1982 State of Origin series and again in 1985, for game III as a reserve. Hard-as-nails, Rampling retired at the end of the 1992 season, age 31.
