= Paul Merlo =

Australian rugby league footballer

Personal information
- Born: 8 April 1955 (age 71) New South Wales, Australia

Playing information
- Position: Lock
Club
Years	Team	Pld	T	G	FG	P
1977–79	Penrith Panthers	55	12	0	0	36
1980–82	Western Suburbs	57	4	0	0	12
1983–84	Cronulla-Sutherland	41	3	0	0	12
	Total	153	19	0	0	60
Representative
Years	Team	Pld	T	G	FG	P
1982	New South Wales	1	0	0	0	0

Paul Merlo is an Australian former professional rugby league footballer who played in the 1970s and 1980s. A New South Wales State of Origin representative forward, he played his club football in the New South Wales Rugby League (NSWRL) competition for the Penrith Panthers, Western Suburbs Magpies and the Cronulla-Sutherland Sharks.

Merlo was selected to represent New South Wales as a second-rower for Game III of the 1982 State of Origin series.

Merlo later worked as a regional manager for Cetnaj Lighting Electrical and Data. Based at Cardiff, New South Wales, he also became the head coach of the South Newcastle Lions in the Newcastle Rugby League competition.

In 2010, Merlo was named in a South Newcastle Lions team of the century. This is the same club Paul played his junior football at.

In 2010, Merlo was named as a member of the Western Suburbs Magpies' Team of the Eighties.

== Sources ==
- Whiticker, Alan; Hudson, Glen (2007). The Encyclopedia of Rugby League Players. Wetherill Park, New South Wales: Gary Allen Pty Ltd. p. 609. ISBN 978-1-877082-93-1.
