= Peter Tunks =

Australian rugby league footballer and coach (born 1958)

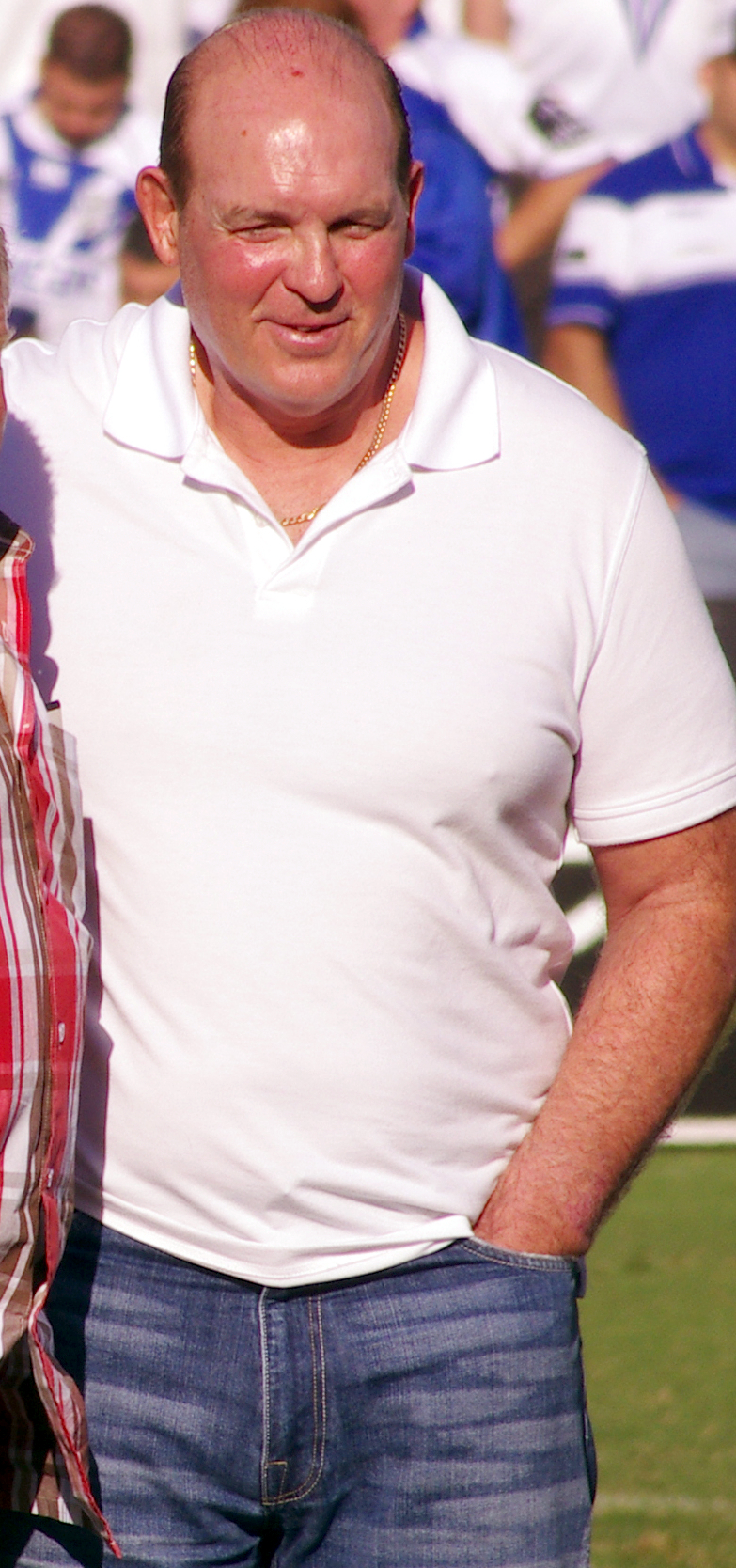

Personal information
- Born: 30 August 1958 (age 67) Sydney, New South Wales, Australia

Playing information
- Height: 192 cm (6 ft 4 in)
- Weight: 108 kg (17 st 0 lb)
- Position: Prop, Second-row, Lock
Club
Years	Team	Pld	T	G	FG	P
1977–83	South Sydney	98	31	0	0	86
1984–89	Canterbury Bulldogs	125	17	0	0	56
1987–88	Leeds	24	7	0	0	28
1990	Penrith Panthers	12	0	0	0	0
1990–91	Salford	14	4	0	0	16
1991	Sheffield Eagles	16	4	0	0	16
	Total	289	63	0	0	202
Representative
Years	Team	Pld	T	G	FG	P
1984–87	New South Wales	10	1	0	0	3
1985–89	NSW City Origin	5	0	0	0	0
1985–87	Australia	10	0	0	0	0

Coaching information
Club
Years	Team	Gms	W	D	L	W%
1993	Oldham

Peter Tunks (born 30 August 1958) is an Australian former professional rugby league footballer who played in the 1970s, 1980s and 1990s, and coached in the 1990s. He played for the South Sydney Rabbitohs, Canterbury-Bankstown Bulldogs, Penrith Panthers, New South Wales, and the Australian national side. After that he played with a number of clubs in England.

Tunks finished in the top eight at the Rothmans Medal six times in his career, and was also voted the best prop in world rugby league twice in the 1980s.

== Background ==
Tunks is a product of Marcellin College Randwick. Regarded as one of the best rugby league players to come out of this school, Tunks also represented NSW at rugby union as a schoolboy in 1976.

== Playing career ==
Graded with Souths in 1977, Tunks made his debut that year as a front row forward at eighteen years of age. Tunks narrowly missed selection for the 1978 Kangaroo tour when he was voted one of the top rookies of the year. In the off season Tunks contracted glandular fever, hepatitis and a kidney disease and missed part of the 1979 season.

Tunks made his State of Origin début in 1981, the same year he led South Sydney to victory in the Panasonic Cup, scoring the winning try. In 1982 Tunks was told he would be touring with the Kangaroos but was not taken due to off field indiscretions.

In 1984 Tunks left Souths and went to Canterbury-Bankstown where Warren Ryan built a team around Tunks and Peter Kelly as prop forwards to create a style of play known as "Wozzaball", with the team nicknamed "The Enforcers" due to the power of their defence, which at the end of the 1984 season conceded just a solitary penalty goal in almost four complete games. With both Souths and Canterbury, Tunks would frequently run wide of the ruck, so that his try tally was unusually large for a front row forward.

Tunks played in four grand finals in five seasons for the Bulldogs, winning three. He toured New Zealand in 1985 with the Kangaroos and was voted player of the tour ahead of Wally Lewis, Mal Meninga, Peter Sterling and others. In 1986, Tunks refused to tour with the Kangaroos and he also refused to make himself available for the 1988 World Cup Final against New Zealand the week after he captained Canterbury to the premiership.

Tunks played ten State of Origin games but was selected in sixteen – missing some games due to injury. Tunks played Origin in 1985 when NSW won it for the first time and then played all 3 games in 1986 when NSW won the series 3–nil for the first time in Origin history.

Tunks played at prop in Leeds' 14–15 defeat by St. Helens in the 1987–88 John Player Special Trophy Final during the 1987–88 season at Central Park, Wigan on Saturday 9 January 1988.

In 1990, Tunks followed Phil Gould to Penrith but caught glandular fever and retired halfway through the season. He went to England where he had a successful coaching stint for three seasons with Oldham was then appointed Chief Executive at Wakefield Trinity and then Managing Director at Hull FC.

== Club list ==
- Australia 1985-87:10 games including 6 Tests (0pts)
- New South Wales 1981-87:10 games 1 try (3pts)
- South Sydney 1977-83: 98 games - 31t (86pts)
- Canterbury 1984-89: 125 games - 17t (56pts)
- Penrith 1990: 12 games (0pts)
- Leeds RLFC 1987-88: 24 games 7 tries
- Salford RLFC 1990-91: 14 games 4 tries
- Sheffield Eagles RLFC 1991: 16 games 4 tries

== Sources ==
- Encyclopedia of Rugby League Players, Canterbury-Bankstown edition by Alan Whiticker & Glen Hudson
