= Terry Fahey =

Australia international rugby league footballer & racehorse trainer

Personal information
- Born: 20 January 1954 (age 72) Wellington, New South Wales, Australia

Playing information
- Height: 185 cm (6 ft 1 in)
- Weight: 95 kg (14 st 13 lb)
- Position: Wing
Club
Years	Team	Pld	T	G	FG	P
197?–75	Wellington Roosters
1976–80	South Sydney	89	46	28	0	194
1981–82	Eastern Suburbs	47	23	0	0	69
1983–87	Canberra Raiders	54	28	0	0	112
	Total	190	97	28	0	375
Representative
Years	Team	Pld	T	G	FG	P
1975–84	NSW Country	2	0	0	0	0
1976–82	New South Wales	8	4	0	0	12
1975–81	Australia	6	3	0	0	9

Terry Fahey (born 20 January 1954) is an Australian former professional rugby league footballer who played for the South Sydney Rabbitohs, Eastern Suburbs Roosters and Canberra Raiders clubs. He was a powerful, hard-running wing.

== Background ==
Fahey was born in Wellington, New South Wales, Australia.

== Playing career ==
Nicknamed the "Redfern Express", Fahey started his football career in the New South Wales country, playing in Western Division's win in the 1974 Amco Cup final over Penrith. In 1975, he was selected to represent Country against City. He was also selected to play for Australia in the 1975 World Championship series. His is listed on the Australian Players Register as Kangaroo No. 481. He left his club Wellington to move to the Sydney competition in 1975 to play for Souths. He went on to play 90 first grade matches for the Rabbitohs in the years 1976-1980 scoring 46 tries and 28 goals for a total of 194 points. In 1981 he joined Easts where he would stay for two seasons. He was the season's leading try scorer in 1981 with fifteen tries. Fahey signed with Canberra in 1983 but damaged bone in his neck caused him to sit out the entire 1985 season. He was playing again in 1986 and remained with the Raiders until the end of the 1987 season, when he retired.

Fahey played three tests for Australia between 1975 and 1981 (scoring three tries) and a total of eight internationals. He also played eight games for New South Wales, two being State of Origin matches in 1981 and 1982.

== Post playing ==
Fahey was named on the wing in the NRL's Team of the 1970s when it was announced in 2005.

He became involved in breeding and training greyhounds and has since moved on to racehorse training.

== Sources ==
- Alan Whiticker & Glen Hudson (2007). The Encyclopedia of Rugby League Players. Wetherill Park, New South Wales: Gary Allen Pty Ltd. p. 151. ISBN 978-1-877082-93-1.
