= David Hall (rugby league) =

Australian rugby league footballer

Personal information
- Full name: David Hall
- Born: 23 September 1968 (age 56)

Playing information
- Position: Wing
Club
Years	Team	Pld	T	G	FG	P
1990–97	North Sydney	158	55	0	0	220
1998	South Sydney	5	0	0	0	0
	Total	163	55	0	0	220
Representative
Years	Team	Pld	T	G	FG	P
1995	New South Wales	1	0	0	0	0

David Hall (born 23 September 1968) is an Australian former professional rugby league footballer who played in the 1990s for the North Sydney Bears and the South Sydney Rabbitohs. He primarily played on the wing.

== Playing career ==
Hall made his debut for North Sydney in round 8 of the 1990 season against the Gold Coast Seagulls. Hall's arrival at the club coincided with the club going from easy beats to title contenders in the 1990s. Hall then went on to play for Norths over the following 8 seasons including 4 preliminary final heartbreaks as the club fell short of an elusive grand final appearance. At representative level, Hall was selected to replace the sacked John Hopoate on the wing for New South Wales in game III of the 1995 State of Origin series. Hall joined Souths for the 1998 NRL season and played 5 games for the club before retiring at season's end.

== Sources ==
- Whiticker, Alan; Hudson, Glen (2007). The Encyclopedia of Rugby League Players. Wetherill Park, New South Wales: Gary Allen Pty Ltd. p. 609. ISBN 978-1-877082-93-1.
