= Garry Dowling =

Australia international rugby league footballer

- Garry Dowling, 1981

Personal information
- Full name: Garry William Dowling
- Born: 7 November 1952; Camden, New South Wales, Australia
- Died: 5 March 1983 (aged 30); Mount Tamborine, Queensland, Australia

Playing information
- Height: 173 cm (5 ft 8 in)
- Weight: .88 kg (13 st 12 lb)
- Position: Fullback, Wing
Club
Years	Team	Pld	T	G	FG	P
1971–78	Canterbury-Bankstown	113	39	22	1	162
1979–80	Parramatta Eels	37	23	0	0	69
1981	Western Suburbs	19	5	0	0	15
	Total	169	67	22	1	246
Representative
Years	Team	Pld	T	G	FG	P
1981	New South Wales	1	0	0	0	0
1980	Australia	2	0	0	0	0
- Source: As of 31 October 2019

Garry William Dowling (7 November 1952 – 5 March 1983) was an Australian professional rugby league footballer who played in the 1970s and 1980s.

== Playing career ==
He played eight seasons of club football and 113 first grade games for Canterbury-Bankstown between 1971 and 1978, two seasons at Parramatta between 1979 and 1980, and one season at Western Suburbs in 1981.

A talented fullback, Dowling represented New South Wales in 1975 and 1980 and for the Australian national side in two tests against New Zealand, also in 1980 of which he was named 'Player of the Series'. He is listed on the Australian Players Register as Kangaroo No.525. He played at fullback in Canterbury-Bankstown's grand final loss to Easts in 1974.

== Death ==
Garry Dowling died in a car accident near Mount Tamborine on 5 March 1983.
