= Steve Simpson (rugby league) =

Australia international rugby league footballer

Personal information
- Born: 27 September 1979 (age 46) Maitland, New South Wales, Australia

Playing information
- Height: 191 cm (6 ft 3 in)
- Weight: 104 kg (16 st 5 lb)
- Position: Second-row, Prop, Lock
Club
Years	Team	Pld	T	G	FG	P
1999–10	Newcastle Knights	216	32	0	0	128
Representative
Years	Team	Pld	T	G	FG	P
2001–05	Country NSW	3	0	0	0	0
2002–08	New South Wales	13	0	0	0	0
2002–07	Australia	8	2	0	0	4

Steve Simpson (born 27 September 1979) is an Australian former professional rugby league footballer who played in the 2000s. A New South Wales State of Origin and Australia international representative second-row, he could also play prop or lock and played his entire club career for the Newcastle Knights, with whom he won the 2001 NRL Premiership.

== Background ==
Simpson was born in Maitland, New South Wales, Australia.

== Career ==
Simpson played for the Newcastle Knights at second-row forward in their 2001 NRL Grand Final victory over the Parramatta Eels. Having won the 2001 NRL Premiership, the Knights travelled to England to play the 2002 World Club Challenge against Super League champions, the Bradford Bulls. Simpson played at second-row forward in Newcastle's loss. He was first selected to represent New South Wales as a second-rower for all three games of the 2002 State of Origin series. Simpson made his test debut in Australia's 64–10 victory over Great Britain in July 2002.

At the end of the 2003 NRL season, he went on the 2003 Kangaroo tour.

Injuries prevented Simpson from being available for the 2003 and 2004 State of Origin series, he played in all games of the 2005, 2006 and 2007 series. He also participated in the 2006 ANZAC Tests against New Zealand. Simpson was selected to play for the Australian national team from the interchange bench in the 2007 ANZAC Test match victory against New Zealand. In August 2008, Simpson was named in the preliminary 46-man Kangaroos squad for the 2008 Rugby League World Cup. He was selected for Country in the City vs Country match on 8 May 2009. However, he did not play in the match after withdrawing with injury.

He was offered to play for the Ireland national rugby league team in the 2008 Rugby World Cup but declined.

On 10 August 2010, Simpson announced his retirement after an ongoing knee injury did not respond well to treatment. In his career Simpson has played 216 games and scored 32 tries.
