= Graham Lyons =

Australian rugby league footballer

Personal information
- Full name: Graham Lyons
- Born: 28 June 1969 (age 55)

Playing information
- Position: Wing, Centre
Club
Years	Team	Pld	T	G	FG	P
1988–91	South Sydney	60	16	0	0	64
1992	Penrith Panthers	3	0	0	0	0
1993–94	Balmain Tigers	33	14	0	0	56
	Total	96	30	0	0	120
Representative
Years	Team	Pld	T	G	FG	P
1990	New South Wales	3	0	0	0	0
1989	NSW City	1	0	0	0	0
- Source: As of 22 October 2019

Graham Lyons (born 28 June 1969) is an Indigenous Australian, and a former professional rugby league footballer who played for South Sydney, Penrith and Balmain in the New South Wales Rugby League (NSWRL) competition. Lyons primarily played on the wing but spent the majority of the 1989 season in the centres. He is the cousin of fellow rugby league player Cliff Lyons.

== Playing career ==
Lyons made his debut for South Sydney (first grade player number 765) in round 5 1988 against St. George at Belmore Oval. In 1989, Lyons was part of the South Sydney side which won the minor premiership. Lyons played in the club's preliminary final defeat against the Canberra Raiders.

In 1990, Lyons finished as Souths top try scorer but his team endured a horror year on and off the field with the club finishing last on the table.

Lyons was selected for the New South Wales Blues for the three State of Origin games in 1990, starting on the wing in games II and III. He also played for the Australian Aboriginal side at the 1990 Pacific Cup.

A speedy winger, Lyons was unable to regain the form that earned him selection for New South Wales, moving to Penrith in 1992 and then Balmain where his first grade career ended in 1994. In his first season at Balmain, Lyons finished as the club's top try scorer with ten tries. Lyons final year in the top grade saw Balmain finish last on the table. This was only the fourth time in the club's history in which they had finished last. Lyons last game was in round 22 1994 against the Brisbane Broncos in which Balmain lost 41–6.

Including Lyons appearances for NSW & City, his career total was 100 first grade games & he scored 30 tries.
