= David Boyle (rugby league, born 1959) =

Australian rugby league footballer

Personal information
- Born: 31 August 1959 (age 67)

Playing information
- Height: 180 cm (5 ft 11 in)
- Weight: 93 kg (14 st 9 lb)
- Position: Prop, Second-row
Club
Years	Team	Pld	T	G	FG	P
1982–91	South Sydney	169	7	0	0	28
1988–89	Hull FC	20	1	0	0	4
	Total	189	8	0	0	32
Representative
Years	Team	Pld	T	G	FG	P
1987	New South Wales	4	1	0	0	4

David Boyle (born 31 August 1959) is an Australian former professional rugby league footballer who played in the 1980s and 1990s. He played for the South Sydney Rabbitohs in the New South Wales Rugby League (NSWRL) competition and for Hull FC in England.

== Playing career ==
Boyle played in the forwards, starting in the second row and moving to the front row midway through his career, though he was lightweight even by the standards of the 1980s. His high workrate, however, made him part of one of the strongest defences in the NSWRL competition of the late 1980s under George Piggins.

Boyle was selected to represent New South Wales as a forward for the three games of the 1987 State of Origin series as well as the fourth or 'exhibition' game of the year which was played at Veteran's Memorial Stadium in Long Beach, California. Boyle scored one State of Origin try in game III. A one-club player, Boyle spent ten seasons with South Sydney. He was part of the 1989 Minor Premiership winning team.

== Post playing ==
Boyle later moved into sports fitness and worked with St. George Illawarra Dragons and then the Rabbitohs as a strength and conditioning coach. David Boyle is a current board member of the Australian Strength & Conditioning Association.

In 2010, Boyle was the endorsed Australian Labor Party candidate for the NSW federal Division of Gilmore. On 18 June 2010, Boyle announced that he would withdraw as the endorsed candidate for Gilmore. Later that year he was elected as a councillor for Shellharbour Council.

In 2011, Boyle partnered with Pro Training Programs to offer his rugby league training programs for non professional athletes.
