= Tony Melrose =

Australian rugby league footballer

Personal information
- Born: 7 September 1959 (age 66) Sydney, New South Wales, Australia

Playing information
- Height: 179 cm (5 ft 10 in)
- Weight: 81 kg (12 st 11 lb)

Rugby union
- Position: Fly-half
Club
Years	Team	Pld	T	G	FG	P
197?–79	Parramatta Two Blues
19??–??	New South Wales Waratahs
1992–??	Gordon RFC
	Total	0	0	0	0	0
Representative
Years	Team	Pld	T	G	FG	P
197?–79	Australia	6

Rugby league
- Position: Five-eighth, Centre
Club
Years	Team	Pld	T	G	FG	P
1980–81	Parramatta Eels	20	4	18	4	52
1982–83	South Sydney	50	10	148	12	340
1984–85	Manly Sea Eagles	39	7	61	1	151
1986–89	Eastern Suburbs	74	11	71	13	199
	Total	183	32	298	30	742
Representative
Years	Team	Pld	T	G	FG	P
1982	New South Wales	1	0	2	0	4

Tony Melrose (born 7 September 1959) is an Australian former professional rugby league footballer who played in the 1980s. He played in the NSWRL Premiership for Parramatta, South Sydney, Manly-Warringah and Eastern Suburbs in the New South Wales Rugby League (NSWRL) competition. He primarily played in the centres or at Five-eighth.

Melrose began his footballing career playing rugby union. He was captain of the Australian Schoolboys rugby union team and was a member of the team's undefeated tour of Great Britain in 1977. In that Schoolboys squad were the likes of the Ella Brothers Mark, Glen and Gary, as well as future dual international Michael O'Connor and future Australian Kangaroos captain Wally Lewis. He played for the Parramatta Two Blues, New South Wales Waratahs and six tests for Australia as a five-eighth before switching to rugby league in 1980 at the age of twenty.

Melrose was selected to represent New South Wales as a winger for game II of the 1982 State of Origin series, scoring two goals from three attempts.

After two seasons with Parramatta, Tony Melrose moved to Souths where he was the Rabbitohs leading point scorer in 1982 with 186 points (8 tries, 79 goals), and again in 1983 with 154 points (2 tries, 69 goals). He then spent two seasons at Manly under the coaching of Bob Fulton before moving to Easts from 1986 to 1989.

Melrose retired from playing league after the 1989 NSWRL season, having played 183 first grade games (20 with the Eels, 50 with Souths, 39 with Manly and 74 with Easts). He scored a total of 32 tries (4, 10, 7 and 11 with each respective club) and kicked 298 goals (18, 148, 61 and 71).

After retiring from league, Melrose eventually returned to union in 1992, playing with Gordon RFC.

== Footnotes ==
- Whiticker, Alan; Hudson, Glen (2007). The Encyclopedia of Rugby League Players. Wetherill Park, New South Wales: Gary Allen Pty Ltd. p. 609. ISBN 978-1-877082-93-1.
