= Rex Wright =

Australian rugby league footballer and coach

Personal information
- Full name: Rex Alan Wright
- Born: 24 November 1959 (age 66) Sydney, New South Wales, Australia

Playing information
- Position: Hooker
Club
Years	Team	Pld	T	G	FG	P
1984	North Newcastle
1985–87	North Sydney	43	1	0	0	4
	Total	43	1	0	0	4
Representative
Years	Team	Pld	T	G	FG	P
1984	New South Wales	1	0	0	0	0
- Source: RLP As of 2 December 2024

Rex Alan Wright (born in Sydney, New South Wales alongside his twin brother Mark Wright) is an Australian former professional rugby league footballer who played in the 1980s. He played for the North Sydney Bears in the New South Wales Rugby League competition. He also made one appearance at representative level for New South Wales. His position of choice was at hooker.

Wright is one of only three players ever to have been selected to play for New South Wales in the Rugby League State of Origin series whilst not actually playing in the NSWRL at the time. Wright was playing for North Newcastle in the Newcastle Rugby League when he was selected in 1984 for his sole representative appearance.

After his retirement in 1987, Wright went on to become an assistant coach to Royce Simmons at the Penrith Panthers. He then became the HPE and Sport Coordinator at Masada College and Glenunga International High School.

== Career playing statistics ==
=== Point scoring summary ===
Games	Tries	Goals	F/G	Points
42	1	-	-	4

=== Matches played ===
Team	Matches	Years
North Sydney Bears	42	1985–1987
New South Wales	1	1984

== Sources ==
- Whiticker, Alan & Hudson, Glen (2006) The Encyclopedia of Rugby League Players, Gavin Allen Publishing, Sydney
