= Lindsay Johnston =

Australian rugby league footballer

Personal information
- Full name: Lindsay Johnston
- Born: 21 May 1962 (age 64) Gunnedah New South Wales, Australia

Playing information
- Height: 190 cm (6 ft 3 in)
- Weight: 99 kg (15 st 8 lb)
- Position: Prop
Club
Years	Team	Pld	T	G	FG	P
1983–84	North Sydney	29	0	0	0	0
1985	Eastern Suburbs	3	0	0	0	0
1985–86	Hull Kingston Rovers	11	0	0	0	0
1986–89	South Sydney	27	0	0	0	0
1989–90	Halifax	24	1	0	0	4
	Total	94	1	0	0	4
Representative
Years	Team	Pld	T	G	FG	P
1983	New South Wales	2	0	0	0	0

Lindsay Johnston (born 6 March 1964) is an Australian former professional rugby league footballer. Johnston was originally from Gunnedah.

He played for the North Sydney Bears, Eastern Suburbs and South Sydney Rabbitohs as well as the English clubs, Hull KR and Halifax. Johnston primarily played in the prop-forward position.

Johnston was selected to represent New South Wales as a prop-forward for games II and III of the 1983 State of Origin series.
