= Jim Leis =

Australian rugby league footballer

Personal information
- Full name: Jim Leis
- Born: 10 October 1959 (age 66) New South Wales, Australia

Playing information
- Position: Lock
Club
Years	Team	Pld	T	G	FG	P
1980–82	Western Suburbs	55	16	0	0	48
1983–85	Canterbury	25	2	0	0	8
1986–87	Cronulla-Sutherland	9	1	0	0	4
	Total	89	19	0	0	60
Representative
Years	Team	Pld	T	G	FG	P
1980	New South Wales	1	0	0	0	0
1984	NSW Country	1	0	0	0	0

Jim Leis (born 10 October 1959) is an Australian former professional rugby league footballer who played in the 1980s.

== Playing career ==
A New South Wales representative forward, he played in the New South Wales Rugby League (NSWRL) competition for Western Suburbs for three seasons between 1980 and 1982, Canterbury-Bankstown for three seasons between 1983–1985 and the Cronulla-Sutherland Sharks for two seasons between 1986 and 1987.

In his debut first-grade season, Leis was selected to represent New South Wales in the 2nd state of residence game, and kept his place at lock for the inaugural State of Origin game in 1980. In the same year he was selected to tour New Zealand with the Australian national team, playing in 2 games on the 7 game tour, although he did not play in a test, and earned two Dally M awards in 1980 for lock-forward of the year and rookie of the year. He retired after the 1987 season after eight seasons in first grade.

Leis was named at lock in the Western Suburbs Magpies Team of the Eighties.

Starting his career in the country, Leis is a supporter promoting rugby league in country regions.
