= Ziggy Niszczot =

Australian rugby league footballer

Personal information
- Born: 1 September 1955 (age 70) Maitland, New South Wales, Australia

Playing information
- Height: 187 cm (6 ft 2 in)
- Weight: 90 kg (14 st 2 lb)
- Position: Wing, Centre
Club
Years	Team	Pld	T	G	FG	P
	Norths (Newcastle)
1980–84	South Sydney	114	38	0	0	126
	Total	114	38	0	0	126
Representative
Years	Team	Pld	T	G	FG	P
1982	New South Wales	2	2	0	0	6

Zbigniew "Ziggy" Niszczot (born 1 September 1955) is an Australian former professional rugby league footballer who played in the 1980s. He played for the South Sydney Rabbitohs in the New South Wales Rugby League premiership. He was a powerful, hard running wing or centre.

== Playing career ==
Originally from Maitland, New South Wales, Niszczot played for North Newcastle before signing with South Sydney in 1980. Niszczot captained the Rabbitohs in the early 1980s.

Niszczot was selected for New South Wales for Games I and II of the 1982 State of Origin series against Queensland, scoring two tries in Game I to inspire a 20–16 win at Lang Park.

== Sources ==
- Andrews, Malcolm. The ABC of Rugby League. Australia: ABC Books, 2006.
- Alan Whiticker & Glen Hudson (2007). The Encyclopedia of Rugby League Players. Wetherill Park, New South Wales: Gary Allen Pty Ltd. p. 396. ISBN 978-1-877082-93-1.
