= John Coveney =

Australian rugby league footballer

Personal information
- Full name: John Coveney
- Born: 6 October 1958 (age 68) Narromine, New South Wales, Australia

Playing information
- Position: Prop
Club
Years	Team	Pld	T	G	FG	P
19??–77	Goulburn United
1977–83	Canterbury Bulldogs	100	2	0	0	6
1984	Western Suburbs	12	0	0	0	0
	Total	112	2	0	0	6
Representative
Years	Team	Pld	T	G	FG	P
1979–82	New South Wales	5	0	0	0	0
1982	NSW City	1	0	0	0	0

John Coveney is an Australian former professional rugby league footballer who played in the 1970s and 1980s. A New South Wales state representative forward, he played in the NSWRFL Premiership for Canterbury-Bankstown, with whom he won the 1980 Grand final and also Western Suburbs.

== Playing career ==
From Narromine, New South Wales Coveney was playing with Goulburn United when he was selected in Country Seconds in 1977.

He was lured to Sydney to join Canterbury-Bankstown during the 1977 NSWRFL season. He played in Canterbury's 1977 semi-final loss to the Parramatta Eels and featured throughout his club's successful 1979 season though he missed the Grand final with a leg injury. Also in 1979 Coveney was selected in the New South Wales rugby league team for the annual series against Queensland and he made three appearances for his State in matches played under the "state of residence" selection criteria.

Coveney was an integral part of the club's stellar 1980 season including their 1980 NSWRFL season's Grand final win over Eastern Suburbs. In the 1982 State of Origin series – the first full 3-match series played under the State of Origin selection criteria – he made two appearances for New South Wales at prop forward. In 1984 he was one of Western Suburbs' major signings for the year. He made twelve first grade appearances for Western Suburbs.

== Sources ==
- Whiticker, Alan & Hudson, Glen (2006) The Encyclopedia of Rugby League Players, Gavin Allen Publishing, Sydney
- Haddan, Steve (2007) The Finals – 100 Years of National Rugby League Finals, Steve Haddan Publishing, Brisbane
