= David Barnhill =

Ireland international rugby league footballer (born 1969)

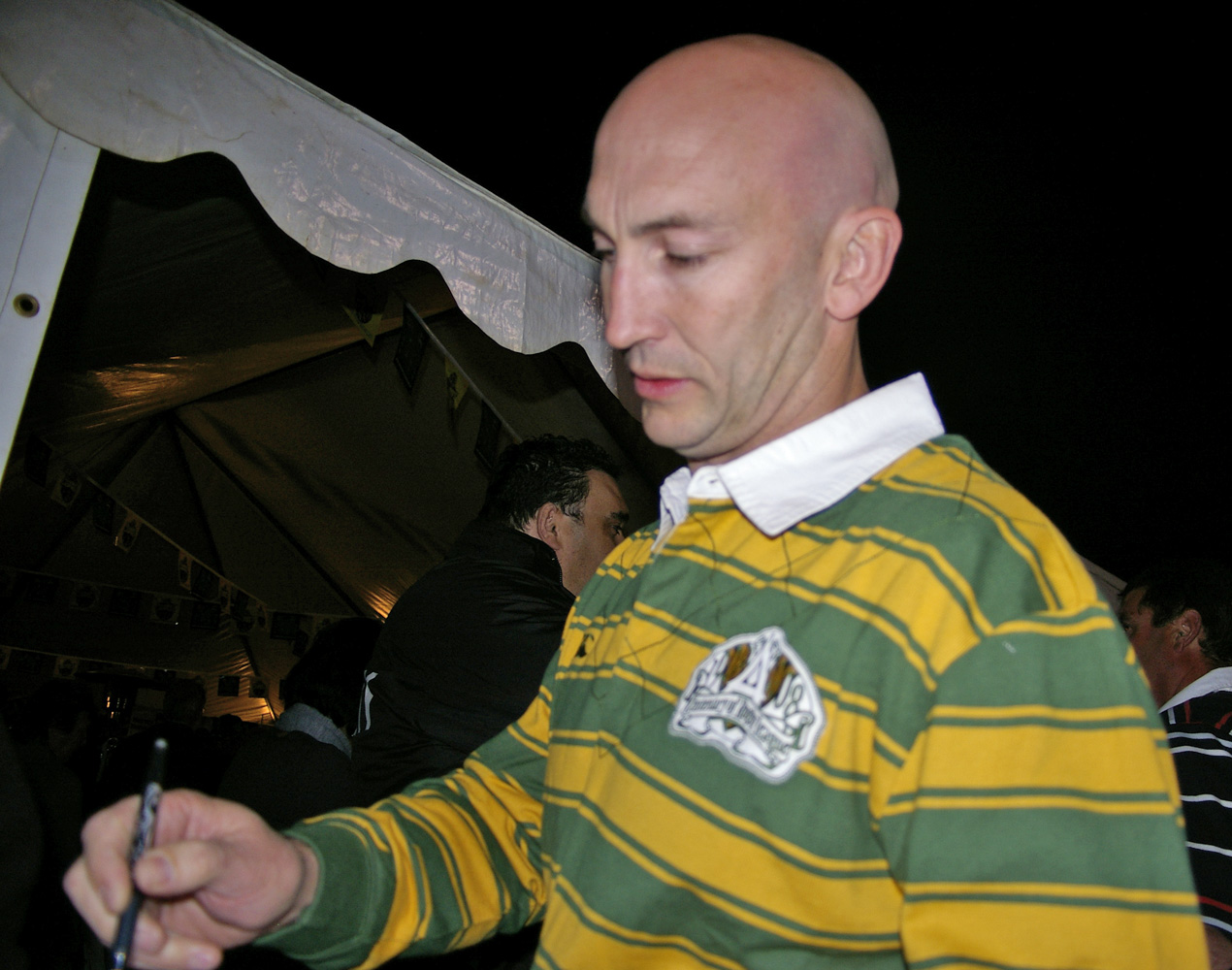
- Barnhill at rugby league centenary celebrations in 2008

Personal information
- Born: 8 June 1969 (age 57) Wagga Wagga, New South Wales, Australia

Playing information
- Position: Second-row
Club
Years	Team	Pld	T	G	FG	P
1989–91	Canberra Raiders	40	1	0	0	4
1992–96	St. George Dragons	111	7	0	0	28
1997–99	Sydney City Roosters	58	0	0	0	0
2000	Leeds Rhinos	28	5	0	0	20
	Total	237	13	0	0	52
Representative
Years	Team	Pld	T	G	FG	P
1994–99	New South Wales	9	0	0	0	0
2000	Ireland	4	0	0	0	0

David Barnhill (born 8 June 1969) is a former Ireland international rugby league footballer who played as a Second row forward in the 1980s, 1990s and 2000s. His club career was with the Canberra Raiders, St. George Dragons, Sydney City and the Leeds Rhinos.

== Background ==
Barnhill was born in Wagga Wagga, New South Wales, Australia.

He was employed as a PE teacher at Kaleen high school in Canberra.

== Club career ==
A Canberra junior, Barnhill made his first grade début with the Raiders late in the 1989 season as a replacement in a match against the South Sydney Rabbitohs. He became a more regular first grader the following year, primarily used off the interchange bench and was a member of the Raiders' victorious 1990 Grand Final side. By 1991 he was first grade regular and appeared in all 26 Canberra season and finals matches that year.

Barnhill joined the St. George Dragons in 1992 and was in the run-on side in 25 of the club's 26 appearances that season. He was a member of Saints' Grand Final sides which lost to Brisbane in 1992 and 1993 and was still with the club for the ARL Grand Final of 1996 when he came on as an early replacement for Kevin Campion.

In 1997 Barnhill joined the Sydney Roosters and spent three years with the club where he mainly played in the Front row. The Roosters were serious Finals contenders in each of those years.

All up Barnhill took part in five first grade Grand finals (four of them in consecutive years) but with only one victory – his first appearance with Canberra in 1990. In ten of his twelve years of Australian first grade appearances Barnhill played in the Finals – exceptions being 1989 and 1994.

In 2000 Barnhill finished his playing career in a season with the Leeds Rhinos. He cut short his two-year contract with Leeds at the end of 2000 and returned to Australia.

== Representative career ==
Barnhill first represented for the New South Wales Blues in State of Origin off the interchange bench in game I of 1994 and he appeared in all three games of that series. The following year he appeared in games II and III and he entered Origin folklore when footage of the all-in brawl of game II showed him standing and slugging it out blow for blow with Queensland's Billy Moore long after the rest of the melee had calmed down. Following a two-year representative absence Barnhill returned to the Origin arena in 1998 and played in all three games. The last match of his nine match Origin career was game I of 1999.

Barnhill represented Ireland in the 2000 World Cup.

== Post playing ==
After retiring as a player Barnhill returned to Australia to take-up a position as defensive coach with the ACT Brumbies rugby union club in 2001. In 2002 he was appointed as Assistant Coach to Nathan Brown at St. George Illawarra Dragons.

In 2005 he relocated to his home town of Wagga Wagga where he manages a hotel. He is the son of the former general manager of the Country Rugby League, David Barnhill, snr. In 2013 he coached the New South Wales Country Residents on a tour of South Africa.
