= Royce Ayliffe =

Australia international rugby league footballer

Personal information
- Full name: David Royce Ayliffe
- Born: 1 January 1956 (age 70) Wollongong, New South Wales, Australia

Playing information
- Position: Prop
Club
Years	Team	Pld	T	G	FG	P
1976–83	Eastern Suburbs	150	14	10	0	67
1985	South Sydney	11	0	0	0	0
	Total	161	14	10	0	67
Representative
Years	Team	Pld	T	G	FG	P
1982	New South Wales	3	0	0	0	0
1981	Australia	1	0	0	0	0

David Royce Ayliffe (born 1 January 1956) is an Australian former professional rugby league footballer who played in the 1970s and 1980s. An Australian international and New South Wales State of Origin representative, he played for and captained the Eastern Suburbs club. Ayliffe also played for the South Sydney Rabbitohs club. During the 1976 NSWRFL season, Brass played in the forwards, helping Eastern Suburbs to victory in their unofficial 1976 World Club Challenge match against British champions St. Helens in Sydney. While attending Wollongong Keira High School, Ayliffe played for the Australian Schoolboys team in 1972. He also gained selection for the Australian Kangaroos in 1981. Since retirement he has served on the NRL Judiciary.

On 24 October 2000, Ayliffe was awarded the Australian Sports Medal for rugby league achievements.
