= Phil Sigsworth =

Australian RL coach and former Australia international rugby league footballer

Personal information
- Full name: Phillip Roderick Sigsworth
- Born: 31 January 1959 (age 67) Newtown, New South Wales, Australia

Playing information
- Position: Fullback, Centre, Five-eighth
Club
Years	Team	Pld	T	G	FG	P
1977–82	Newtown Jets	108	32	39	2	176
1983–84	Manly Sea Eagles	34	12	8	0	64
1985–86	Canterbury Bulldogs	24	4	2	0	20
1987	Balmain Tigers	9	2	0	0	8
	Total	175	50	49	2	268
Representative
Years	Team	Pld	T	G	FG	P
1981–83	New South Wales	5	0	2	0	4
1981	Australia	1	0	0	0	0

Coaching information
Club
Years	Team	Gms	W	D	L	W%
1996–97	Hull FC	41	30	2	9	73
- Relatives: Ron Sigsworth (brother)

Phil Sigsworth (born 31 January 1959), (also known by the nickname of Whats-a-packet-a) is an Australian former professional rugby league footballer. He played primarily in the fullback position. Sigsworth attended Newtown Boys' Junior High School where he played Rugby Union for the school. His junior Rugby League playing days were with the Erskineville Juniors club and then the infamous Newtown Hawks from where he was graded into the district club, Newtown District Rugby League Football Club.

== Playing career ==
Sigsworth, who made his first grade debut for Newtown in 1977, enjoyed a stellar season in 1981 when he made his Test and State of Origin debut while helping take Newtown to the grand final, which they lost 20–11 to Parramatta at the Sydney Cricket Ground.

He was selected for the New South Wales Blues for three State of Origin games from 1981 to 1983 and two Tests with the Australian Kangaroos in 1981, he also played in two Interstate Series games that year as well.

The utility back moved to the Manly-Warringah Sea Eagles in 1983, where he was judged the Rugby League Week player of the year and runner up in the Dally M Medal as well as scoring his team's sole try in their Grand Final loss that season, again to Parramatta. After two seasons with the Manly-Warringah club he joined the then-premiers Canterbury-Bankstown in 1985.

His time at Belmore is remembered for his send-off in the 1986 grand final for a high tackle on Brett Kenny. As of 2026, he is the last player to have been sent off in a rugby league grand final. Canterbury-Bankstown suffered a 4–2 defeat by Parramatta at the Sydney Cricket Ground.

Sigsworth has the distinction of being the first Australian player to participate in three grand finals for three different teams, losing all three matches against the same team (Parramatta), but was a member of the victorious Canterbury-Bankstown Bulldogs team in 1985 which was against St. George although he did not play in the final. He missed the 1984 premiership victory due to a knee injury.

Sigsworth spent one season with Balmain Tigers in 1987 before drawing the curtain on his Sydney first-grade career because of an in-operable knee injury.

== Post-playing career ==
Sigsworth then moved into coaching, in 1996 he joined English club Hull FC, and coached the team to their first First Division championship title in 1997. Sigsworth parted ways with the club in mid-1999 and returned to Australia where he linked up again with the Balmain Tigers as assistant coach to Wayne Pearce. The club merged with Western Suburbs and after one season in 2000 at Wests Tigers, Pearce stepped down as coach and Sigsworth also left. Sigsworth has not been involved with an NRL club since.

Sigsworth remains involved in rugby league as the chairman of the New South Wales Origin Legends who support various charities with their regular events such as re-unions, luncheons, golf days.

In 2008, the centenary year of rugby league in Australia, Sigsworth was named in the Newtown Jets 18-man team of the century.
