= 1995 State of Origin series =

Australian rugby league series

- Won by: Queensland (8th title)
- Series margin: 3 - 0
- Points scored: 74
- Attendance: 133,024 (ave. 44,341 per match)
- Top points scorer(s): Wayne Bartrim (16)
- Top try scorer(s): Brett Dallas (2)

The 1995 State of Origin series was the 14th annual three-game series between the Queensland and New South Wales representative rugby league teams. Due to the Australian Rugby League's ongoing conflicts with Super League, they ruled that no Super League-aligned players (Note: Excluding Canberra, most of the eight Super League-aligned clubs contained a handful of players who did not sign with the new league or attempted to defect back to the ARL, of whom the Broncos' Gavin Allen, the Reds' Brad Mackay, Penrith's Brad Fittler and Matt Sing, and Canterbury's Brett Dallas, Jason Smith and Dean Pay played in this series.) were eligible for State of Origin selection in 1995. This appeared to hurt Queensland, eliminating their mostly Brisbane Broncos backline, and they were not widely expected to win the series. However, they won 3–0, their first series win since 1991. Novice Queensland coach Paul Vautin made only one player change to his squad during the entire series. After an enthusiastic Melbourne crowd packed the MCG to watch game two of the 1994 series, State of Origin football again ventured to Melbourne. Although the crowd in Melbourne was not as high as 1994's then-record origin crowd of 87,161, it was still a success, attracting 52,994 spectators and thus, furthering the case for a Rugby League team in Melbourne.

Brisbane Broncos coach Wayne Bennett had originally been appointed as Queensland coach for 1995 taking over from Wally Lewis. He stepped down from the job, stating that Queensland would be uncompetitive without its Super League players. Paul Vautin, who had played 22 Origin games for Queensland between 1982 and 1990, (Note: This included two games as captain in the absence of Lewis) was brought in to replace him.

== Game I ==
Unable to draw on the vast talents of the Brisbane Broncos whose Super League-aligned players were made ineligible for the Origin series by the Australian Rugby League, Maroons selectors were forced to choose from a limited selection of Queenslanders from ARL-loyal clubs. Consequently, going into Game 1 at the Sydney Football Stadium, the Blues were unbackable favourites with nine internationals in the squad compared to Queensland's two in Dale Shearer and Papua New Guinea halfback Adrian Lam who had to be given dispensation to play for Qld, and an untested commentator-turned-coach in Paul Vautin. Although many considered NSW favourites, the starting sides in Game 1 actually saw Qld have 79 collective Origin games experience, while NSW had only 68 between them.

Monday, 15 May 1995

New South Wales	0–2	Queensland
	(Report)	Wayne Bartrim (2 - 1 g)

Sydney Football Stadium, Sydney
Attendance: 39,841
Referee: Eddie Ward
Player of the Match: Gary Larson

After the first ever try-less State of Origin match, the Maroons left the ground having produced one of the biggest boilovers in rugby league history. A sole penalty goal to Maroons hooker Wayne Bartrim after 30 minutes was enough to see Vautin's unfancied Queensland team home 2–0. Referee Eddie Ward penalised Blues front rower Paul Harragon for a tackle on Gary Larson and Bartrim kicked the goal from 25 metres out. At the time it seemed a minor event but by game's end the goal had become pivotal.

New South Wales failed to capitalise on their chances, crossing the Queensland line twice. First winger Rod Wishart stepped into touch after taking a cross-field kick from Andrew Johns. Then in the second half, Blues centre Terry Hill was held up by Queensland debutante winger Matt Sing over the line with 17 minutes to play. It was the lowest ever score in a representative game in Australia, yet still a compelling spectacle as the underdog Maroons repelled the New South Wales attack time and time again.

From this match, broadcast sound and vision captured Maroons lock Billy Moore exiting the Sydney Football Stadium tunnel after half-time chanting the Maroons' war cry "Queenslander" over and over to exhort his team-mates.

== Game II ==
Wednesday, 31 May 1995

Queensland	20–12	New South Wales
(8 - 4 g) Wayne Bartrim (4 - 1 t) Mark Coyne (4 - 1 t) Brett Dallas (4 - 1 t) Adrian Lam	(Report)	Brett Rodwell (4 - 1 t); Jim Serdaris (4 - 1 t); Rod Wishart (4 - 2 g)

Melbourne Cricket Ground, Melbourne
Attendance: 52,994
Referee: Eddie Ward
Player of the Match: Jason Smith

Going into the second game, Qld suffered a blow when Dale Shearer, their most experienced player (having played 25 games since making his Origin debut in 1985) and only Australian test representative, was ruled out with injury. His place in the side was taken by 1994 Kangaroo tourist Jason Smith. Smith, who had initially signed with Super League earlier in the year, had turned his back on the rebels and had only recently re-signed with the ARL. Playing at Five-eighth rather than his usual position of Lock, Smith won the Man of the Match award.

Rumours of an all-in brawl that had circulated before Game II at the Melbourne Cricket Ground were realised early when the first scrum erupted into violence after NSW Hooker Jim Serdaris started throwing punches at his opposite Wayne Bartrim. Almost like it was rehearsed, most players from both sides became involved and it took referee Eddie Ward a considerable time to restore order. (Note: In the confusion, Ward also failed to stop the game clock and almost 5 minutes elapsed before time was called off) During the brawl there were two main groups. Rival back rowers David Barnhill and Billy Moore waged their own private war throwing a lot of punches that missed their mark before wrestling each other to the ground, while Origin's old cry of "Mate against mate" added another chapter when Manly-Warringah teammates John Hopoate (NSW) and Danny Moore (Qld) squared off after Moore came to Matt Sing's aid. Another outbreak late in the half saw props Paul Harragon and Gavin Allen marched to the sin bin.

Queensland had the run of play, an 8–0 lead on the back of a Mark Coyne try and two goals from Wayne Bartrim. With five minutes remaining, Jim Serdaris scored a converted try to close the gap to 14-12 and the Blues began a final wave of attack. Steve Menzies then came within inches of scoring the match winner but was held up, and then Fittler threw what appeared to be the match winning pass to a try-bound Tim Brasher. However referee Ward ruled the pass forward. As they dropped their guard, flying Queensland winger Brett Dallas caught them out in the dying seconds and ran 90 metres from dummy-half, easily out pacing Hopoate, Brasher and Rod Wishart coming across in cover, to score under the posts and seal the series with a 20–12 victory to give Qld what many believe to be the biggest boilover in Origin history.

== Game III ==
Monday, 12 June 1995

Queensland	24–16	New South Wales
(8 - 4 g) Wayne Bartrim (4 - 1 t) Brett Dallas (4 - 1 t) Ben Ikin (4 - 1 t) Danny Moore (4 - 1 t) Jason Smith	(Report)	Rod Wishart (8 - 1 t, 2 g); Tim Brasher (4 - 1 t); Adam Muir (4 - 1 t)

Lang Park, Brisbane
Attendance: 40,189
Referee: David Manson
Player of the Match: Adrian Lam

Experts were still favouring a New South Wales win in game III, but again they were proved wrong in a match that lived up to Origin expectations. Manly captain Geoff Toovey was called into the NSW side after injury kept him out of the first two games of the series. The chances of popular Maroons' captain Trevor Gillmeister playing in the final game had looked impossible - he had been admitted to hospital with an infected knee and placed on an intravenous drip. In an inspiring gesture that underlined the ferocity of feeling in the side he signed himself out to take his place in the team.

The two combatants punched and counter-punched before a late try to the previously unheralded Gold Coast rookie Ben Ikin gave the Maroons a 24–16 win and a 3–0 series whitewash. New South Wales led twice at 10-6 after 35 minutes and again 16-12 after 41 minutes, but the Queensland spirit was resolute. The series was career defining for Ikin, a Gold Coast junior who became the youngest player in Origin history at 18 years and 83 days when he debuted in Game I. He would later become a mainstay of Queensland and Broncos' sides up until 2003 although his career was disrupted by injury.

Many considered Queensland lucky to play the last 52 minutes of the match with a full team after prop forward Tony Hearn appeared to headbutt NSW prop Mark Carroll in the 28th minute. In retaliation Carroll started throwing punches at Hearn which led to another all in brawl. Remarkably, referee David Manson only put Hearn on report and then penalised Carroll for the use of a forearm while tackling Hearn and awarded a penalty to Qld. Hearn was later suspended for 8 games by the ARL judiciary as a result of his headbutt. After his performances for Qld in the first two games, the front row forward from North Sydney had allegedly been in line for an Australian test jumper before his suspension.

After the game, Gillmeister returned to hospital to continue treatment on his knee.

== New South Wales teams ==
Position	Game 1	Game 2	Game 3
Fullback	Tim Brasher		
Wing	Rod Wishart		
Centre	Terry Hill		
Centre	Paul McGregor		
Wing	Craig Hancock	John Hopoate	David Hall
Five-Eighth	Matthew Johns	Brad Fittler (c)	Matthew Johns
Halfback	Andrew Johns		Geoff Toovey
Prop	Paul Harragon		
Hooker	Jim Serdaris		
Prop	Mark Carroll	Dean Pay	Mark Carroll
Second Row	Brad Mackay	Greg Florimo	Adam Muir
Second Row	Steve Menzies	David Barnhill	Steve Menzies
Lock	Brad Fittler (c)	Brad Mackay	Brad Fittler (c)
Interchange	Greg Florimo	Brett Rodwell	Greg Florimo
Interchange	David Fairleigh		
Interchange	Matt Seers	Steve Menzies	Matt Seers
Interchange	Adam Muir		David Barnhill
Coach	Phil Gould		

== Queensland teams ==
Position	Game 1	Game 2	Game 3
Fullback	Robbie O'Davis		
Wing	Brett Dallas		
Centre	Mark Coyne		
Centre	Danny Moore		
Wing	Matt Sing		
Five-Eighth	Dale Shearer	Jason Smith	
Halfback	Adrian Lam		
Prop	Tony Hearn		
Hooker	Wayne Bartrim		
Prop	Gavin Allen		
Second Row	Trevor Gillmeister (c)		
Second Row	Gary Larson		
Lock	Billy Moore		
Interchange	Ben Ikin		
Interchange	Terry Cook		
Interchange	Mark Hohn		
Interchange	Craig Teevan		
Coach	Paul Vautin		

== See also ==
- 1995 ARL season
- 1995 Trans-Tasman Test series
- Super League War

== Sources ==
- Big League's 25 Years of Origin Collectors' Edition, News Magazines, Surry Hills, Sydney
- Chesterton, Ray (1996) Good as Gould, Ironbark, Sydney
