= 1995 Rugby League World Cup final =

One of Rugby League World Cup finals

England	Australia
(RFL)	(ARL)
8	16
	1	2	Total
ENG	4	4	8
AUS	10	6	16
- Date: 28 October 1995
- Stadium: Wembley Stadium
- Location: London, England
- Man of the Match: Andrew Johns (Australia)
- Referee: Stuart Cummings (Great Britain)
- Attendance: 66,540

Broadcast partners
- Broadcasters: BBC (United Kingdom) Nine Network (Australia)
- Commentators: Ray French (BBC); Steve Simms (BBC); Joe Lydon (BBC); Ray Warren (Nine); Peter Sterling (Nine) Paul Vautin (Nine)

The 1995 Rugby League World Cup final was the conclusive game of the 1995 Centenary World Cup tournament and was played between England and Australia on 28 October 1995 at the Wembley Stadium in London, England. Australia won the final by 16 points to 8 in front of 66,540 fans. Australia, the defending champions, won the Rugby League World Cup for the 8th time.

The pre-match entertainment for the Final was provided by British rock group Status Quo.

== Background ==
1995 was the year of the Super League war, with the new Super League causing a split in Australia. As a result, the Australian Rugby League did not select any player who had signed with Super League (though they did not stand in the way of any SL aligned country from selecting players who were playing in Australia). As 100% of Australia's squad was sourced from Australian Rugby League-aligned players, several test players from the successful 1994 Kangaroo tour of Great Britain and France were not selected for the World Cup, though a number of the team had played in the 3-0 Trans-Tasman Test series win over New Zealand earlier in the year.

After being overlooked for representative games during the year, Super League aligned Canberra Raiders players Laurie Daley, Ricky Stuart, Steve Walters, Bradley Clyde, Brett Mullins and David Furner, all 1994 Kangaroo Tourists, took the ARL to court during 1995 in a bid to be able to play in the World Cup. The courts found in their favour and ordered the ARL to consider all players for selection regardless of who they were aligned to. However, as one unnamed ARL official was quoted as saying, the ARL were only forced to consider Super League players, not select them. Just how many, if any, Super League players were actually considered for selection remains unknown and speculation remains that behind closed doors no Super League player was actually considered for selection.

Without the Super League players, many thought that the Kangaroos would be a second-string side despite their series whitewash over the SL aligned New Zealand earlier in the year.

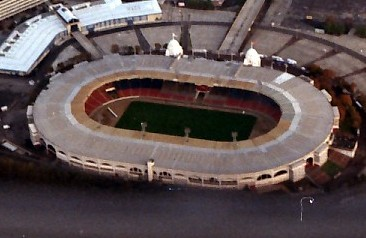
Wembley Stadium in London hosted its second straight World Cup final

=== England ===
England, coached by Phil Larder and captained by Wigan's Denis Betts, had surprised in the opening game of the tournament when they defeated Australia 20–16 at Wembley. England won all three of their group matches.

England defeated Wales 25–10 in the Semi-final at Old Trafford to advance to the Final.

==== Results ====
Opposing Team	For	Against	Date	Venue	Attendance	Stage
Australia	20	16	7 October 1995	Wembley Stadium, London	41,271	Group Stage
Fiji	46	0	11 October 1995	Central Park, Wigan	26,263	Group Stage
South Africa	66	0	14 October 1995	Headingley, Leeds	14,041	Group Stage
Wales	25	10	21 October 1995	Old Trafford, Manchester	30,042	Semi-Final

=== Australia ===
The Bob Fulton coached, Brad Fittler captained Australians began their World Cup defense with shock 20–16 loss to England at Wembley in the opening game of the World Cup. After this the Kangaroos remained undefeated including a then world record 86–6 win over rugby league minnows South Africa.

Australia defeated New Zealand 30–20 in the Semi-final at the McAlpine Stadium in Huddersfield. The game had gone into extra-time after the score was locked at 20-all at the end of the regulation 80 minutes.

==== Results ====
Opposing Team	For	Against	Date	Venue	Attendance	Stage
England	16	20	7 October 1995	Wembley Stadium, London	41,271	Group Stage
South Africa	86	6	10 October 1995	Gateshead International Stadium, Gateshead	9,181	Group Stage
Fiji	66	0	14 October 1995	McAlpine Stadium, Huddersfield	7,127	Group Stage
New Zealand	30	20	22 October 1995	McAlpine Stadium, Huddersfield	16,608	Semi-Final

== Match details ==
28 October 1995
14:30

England	8–16	Australia
Tries: Paul Newlove Goals: Bobby Goulding (2/3)		Tries: Rod Wishart; Tim Brasher; Goals: Andrew Johns (4/5)

Wembley Stadium, London
Attendance: 66,540
Referee: Stuart Cummings (England)
Player of the Match: Andrew Johns

England	Australia

FB	1	Kris Radlinski
RW	2	Jason Robinson
RC	3	Gary Connolly
LC	4	Paul Newlove
LW	5	Martin Offiah
SO	6	Tony Smith
SH	7	Bobbie Goulding
PR	8	Karl Harrison
HK	9	Lee Jackson
PR	10	Andy Platt
SR	11	Denis Betts (c)
SR	12	Phil Clarke
LF	13	Andy Farrell
Substitutions:
IC	14	Barrie-Jon Mather
IC	15	Mick Cassidy
IC	16	Nick Pinkney
IC	17	Chris Joynt
Coach:
(England) Phil Larder

FB	1	Tim Brasher
LW	2	Rod Wishart
RC	3	Mark Coyne
LC	4	Terry Hill
RW	5	Brett Dallas
FE	6	Brad Fittler (c)
HB	7	Geoff Toovey
PR	8	Dean Pay
HK	9	Andrew Johns
PR	10	Mark Carroll
SR	11	Steve Menzies
SR	12	Gary Larson
LK	13	Jim Dymock
Substitutions:
IC	14	Robbie O'Davis
IC	15	Matthew Johns
IC	16	Jason Smith
IC	17	Nik Kosef
Coach:
(Australia) Bob Fulton

=== 1st half ===
England won the coin toss and Australia's Andrew Johns kicked off the match. In England's first set with the ball Australia were penalised for their skipper Brad Fittler's high tackle on Andrew Farrell. From the resulting good field position England were able to force a line drop-out and get another set of six in Australia's half of the field when Brett Dallas was judged to have caught the ball in the field of play before being tackled by Paul Newlove. At the end of the second set, Radlinski put up a high kick, which Australia's fullback Tim Brasher failed to secure and Jim Dymock was penalised for regathering the ball when off-side (the referee ruled that Brasher had knocked on, though replays suggested Martin Offiah got a hand to the ball). Bobbie Goulding kicked the penalty goal from fifteen metres out, giving his side a 2–0 lead. From Australia's resulting kick-off, Andy Farrell tried to trap the ball with his foot but it bounced off upfield and with his teammates failing to react, it was regathered by Andrew Johns only two metres out from the English try line. On the last tackle of the ensuing set, Johns at first receiver put a perfectly weighted grubber kick into the left-hand corner of England's in-goal area where winger Rod Wishart dived in and got a hand on it, giving Australia the first try of the match in the seventh minute. Johns then converted the try from the touch-line and the Kangaroos were leading 6–2. A few minutes later England were penalised around the centre of the field and Johns attempted the kick at goal but missed. With the game now swinging from end to end, Johns conceded a penalty close to the goal posts and Goulding's kick bounced off the uprights but went in, so England were trailing 4–6 by the eighteenth minute. A few minutes later England conceded a penalty in front of their goal posts and Johns kicked Australia to an 8–4 lead. Shortly after, Martin Offiah made a break from 15 metres inside his own half and raced 60 metres down along the left sideline with Dallas and Steve Menzies (a second row forward who almost ran down the flying winger) in pursuit and was contentiously ruled to have been taken over the sideline 5 metres out by a desperate Tim Brasher tackle as he threw the ball back into the field for Paul Newlove to toe ahead and dive on, though television replays suggested that Offiah had managed to release the ball before he went into touch. After a high shot from Andy Farrell on Mark Carroll, Johns kicked another penalty giving Australia a 10–4 lead at the thirty-minute mark. Just before the half-time break England conceded another penalty in the ruck but Johns' kick missed so the score remained unchanged at the break.

=== 2nd half ===
After making their way into good attacking field position, England played the ball ten metres out from Australia's goal-line where centre Paul Newlove at dummy-half ran the ball at the defence of Terry Hill and Brett Dallas to force his way through to score in the left corner. The sideline conversion attempt by Goulding missed so England trailed 8–10 after five minutes of the second half. Around the ten-minute mark the game was interrupted by a topless female streaker. The play continued swinging from one end of the field to the other, with neither team able to capitalise on their scoring opportunities for the next twenty minutes. Australian interchange player Jason Smith was blood binned and had to return to the bench. A few minutes later the Kangaroos had made their way deep into England's half when, on the last tackle, the ball was moved through the hands and eventually flicked passed back from Johns as he was being tackled to the feet of Brasher who kicked it ahead to the try-line. Both fullbacks then scrambled to get to the ball and the referee ruled that Brasher had grounded it, awarding Australia a try. Johns converted the try so Australia lead 16–8 with just over ten minutes remaining. England forward Karl Harrison then had to come off the field with an injured arm. A few minutes from full-time Australian forward Mark Carroll was sent to the sin-bin for an infringement in the ruck. The remainder of the match extended into additional injury time but was played with no further points so Australia retained the World Cup with a 16–8 victory and their fifth consecutive world title.

21-year-old Andrew Johns was named man-of-the-match. Kangaroos coach Bob Fulton had named the young half as the team hooker, and he did indeed pack into the scrums. However Johns played at halfback in general play with Geoff Toovey having the dummy-half duties, necessary because Toovey had actually injured his neck during the tournament and simply could not pack into the front row in the scrums.

Following the match Prince Edward, Earl of Wessex presented Kangaroos captain Brad Fittler with the Cup and each of the players with medals. During the 1990 Kangaroo Tour, an 18-year-old Fittler had reportedly broken protocol when he had said "G'day dude" to Prince Edward's father, HRH Prince Philip, Duke of Edinburgh when the team had met the Duke as part of the tour. History allegedly repeated itself as Fittler was heard to say "Thanks dude" to Prince Edward when receiving the World Cup on the Wembley balcony.
