= 2011 Legends of Origin charity match =

| New South Wales Origin Legends | Queensland Origin Legends |
|---|---|
| 16 | 20 |
| | 1 | 2 | Total |
|---|---|---|---|
| NSW | 4 | 12 | 16 |
| QLD | 16 | 4 | 20 |
- Date: 27 January 2011
- Stadium: Parramatta Stadium
- Location: Sydney, NSW, Australia
- National anthem: Shannon Noll
- Referee: Bill Harrigan
- Attendance: 20,000 (approx)

Broadcast partners
- Broadcasters: Triple M (radio) FOX Sports (television)
- Commentators: Dan Ginnane; H.G. Nelson; Andrew Johns

The 2011 Legends of Origin charity match was a rugby league football game played on 27 January 2011 at Parramatta Stadium in Sydney. The match was organised by Mark Geyer in response to the 2010–11 Queensland floods. The match was contested between the New South Wales Origin Legends and the Queensland Origin Legends. The teams were made up of former State of Origin players. The match was won by Queensland with a final score of 20 to 16.

== Background ==
After the devastating floods that had affected most of Queensland including its capital city of Brisbane, Mark Geyer from radio station Triple M Sydney on his breakfast program The Grill Team announced that he will be organising a charity match to raise funds for the recovery effort. The match, organised in seven days, was sold out in 36 hours.

== Match day ==
The pre-match entertainment consisted of INXS performing a sombre version of their song "Don't Change". The players were then announced onto the field one by one. Shannon Noll sang the Australian national anthem.

== Teams ==
The match featured former State of Origin players, while a Sydney grocerer Tony Trim was included in the New South Wales side after donating $14,600 to the flood relief effort. Former Australian cricketer Andrew Symonds played in the Queensland side, alongside actor Lincoln Lewis, son of Queensland coach Wally.

2011 Legends of Origin Teams
| New South Wales Origin Legends | positions | Queensland Origin Legends |
|---|---|---|
| 1 Garry Jack (41) | Fullback | 1 Robbie O'Davis (38) |
| 2 Nathan Blacklock (34) | Wing | 2 Willie Carne (42) |
| 3 Ryan Girdler (38) | Centre | 3 Mal Meninga (50) (c) |
| 4 David Peachey (36) | Centre | 4 Gary Belcher (48) |
| 5 Eric Grothe, Sr. (51) | Wing | 5 Kerry Boustead (51) |
| 6 Cliff Lyons (49) | Five-Eighth | 6 Tony Currie (48) |
| 7 Brett Kimmorley (34) | Halfback | 7 Adrian Lam (40) |
| 8 Mark Carroll (43) | Prop | 8 Sam Backo (50) |
| 9 Benny Elias (47) | Hooker | 9 Kerrod Walters (43) |
| 10 Mario Fenech (49) | Prop | 10 Colin Scott (50) |
| 11 Luke Ricketson (37) | Second Row | 11 Gorden Tallis (37) |
| 12 Mark Geyer (43) (c) | Second Row | 12 Wendell Sailor (36) |
| 13 Brad Fittler (38) | Lock | 13 Jamie Goddard (38) |
| 14 Greg Alexander (45) | Interchange | 14 Mat Rogers (34) |
| 15 Tim Brasher (39) | Interchange | 15 Mark Coyne (43) |
| 16 Terry Lamb (49) | Interchange | 16 Jason Smith (38) |
| 17 Tony Trim | Interchange | 17 Andrew Symonds (35) |
| 18 Rod Wishart (42) | Interchange | 18 Kevin Campion (39) |
| 19 Bryan Fletcher (36) | Interchange | 19 Robert Josifovski |
| 20 Paul Sironen (45) | Interchange | |
| Phil Gould | Coach | Wally Lewis |

=== Scorecard ===
| 20 | Queensland Origin Legends |
|---|---|
| Tries | 1 Belcher (8'); 1 Sailor (20'); 1 Lam (28'); 1 O'Davis (35') |
| Goals | 2/2 Rogers (9', 21'); 0/1 Meninga; 0/1 Tallis |
| Field goals | |
| 16 | New South Wales Origin Legends |
| Tries | 1 Trim (23'); 1 Blacklock (53'); 1 Peachey (59') |
| Goals | 1/2 Girdler (51) |
| Field goals | |

First Quarter Time: 6 – 0
Half Time: 16 – 4
Three Quarter Time: 20 – 4

==== Timeline ====
8th: Queensland 6 – 0 (Try: Belcher, Goal: Rogers)
20th: Queensland 12 – 0 (Try: Sailor, Goal: Rogers)
23rd: New South Wales 4 – 12 (Try: Trim)
28th: Queensland 16 – 4 (Try: Lam)
35th: Queensland 20 – 4 (Try: O'Davis)
53rd: New South Wales 10 – 20 (Try: Blacklock, Goal: Girdler)
59th: New South Wales 16 – 20 (Try: Peachey)

Despite the charitable purpose behind the match, it featured some heavy tackles and confrontations between opposing players. Because of the age of most of the players, unlimited interchanges were allowed and the match was split into four 15-minute quarters. No attempt at goal was made by New South Wales after Peachey's try. Harvey Norman donated $1000 for every try. After the match, Triple M presented cheque to value to $380,587.00 to go towards the Premier's Disaster Relief Fund to the Queensland Minister for Sport and Minister Child Safety, Phil Reeves.

=== Audience ===
The game was sold-out with over 20,000 in attendance at Parramatta Stadium. It was also the number one programme of the week on Foxtel with 272,000 viewers and countless more listening live on radio.
