= 1994 Kangaroo tour of Great Britain and France =

1994 rugby league tour

1994 Kangaroos tour
- Date: 2 October 1994 – 4 December 1994
- Manager: Geoff Carr, Ron Wilkinson
- Coach(es): Bob Fulton
- Tour captain(s): Mal Meninga
- Top point scorer(s): Rod Wishart (174)
- Top try scorer(s): Andrew Ettingshausen (15)
Summary
P	W	D	L
Total
18	17	0	1
Test match
4	3	0	1
Opponent
P	W	D	L
Great Britain
3	2	0	1
France
1	1	0	0

Tour chronology
- Previous tour: 1990
- Next tour: 2001

The 1994 Kangaroo Tour was the 18th and last Kangaroo Tour played in the conventional format, where the Australia national rugby league team (known as the XXXX Kangaroos due to sponsorship reasons) played a number of matches against British and French clubs or provincial outfits, in additions to the Test matches. The outbreak of the Super League war in early 1995 meant that the next Kangaroo tour, set for 1998, never eventuated, although shortened, test only tours were staged in 2001 and 2003.

Australia continued its dominance, winning both Test series against Great Britain and France, suffering only one loss (against Great Britain in the First Test at Wembley, just as they had done in 1990), and remained undefeated against British club outfits in a streak stretching back to the 1978 tour.

The team was coached by Bob Fulton who was making his fourth Kangaroo tour (1973 and 1978 as a player, the latter as captain, and 1990 as coach). Team captain Mal Meninga created history by becoming the first and so far only player to make four tours as a player. He also became the first player to captain consecutive tours. His four tours included being a member of two undefeated teams, first as a member of "The Invincibles" in 1982, and the second with "The Unbeatables" in 1986. Meninga also had the remarkable record of playing in every test match during each of his 4 tours meaning that 21 of his eventual 46 tests for Australia were playing on a Kangaroo Tour of Great Britain and France. Fulton and Meninga also became the first pair to be the coach and captain on consecutive Kangaroo tours. Laurie Daley, the New South Wales State of Origin captain who had captained the Australian team to a 14–all draw with New Zealand in Auckland in 1993 with Meninga missing due to suspension, was named as the tour's vice-captain.

Balmain Tigers Second-rower Paul Sironen became just the fourth forward to be selected for three Kangaroo tours, having previously toured in 1986 and 1990.

This was the last full strength Australian side to take the field until after the resolution of the Super League war (1998) with all Australian teams from 1995–1997 being made up exclusively of either Australian Rugby League (ARL) loyal or Super League (SL) aligned players.

The Kangaroo tour was televised back to Australia on the Nine Network with commentary provided by Nine's rugby league commentary team of Ray Warren (making a rare appearance overseas due to a fear of flying), 1982 and 1986 Kangaroo tourist Peter Sterling, and 13 test veteran for Australia Paul Vautin. Following the second test Vautin was forced to return to Australia for medical reasons. He was replaced in the commentary box by former Great Britain halfback Alex Murphy who had provided sideline comments for Nine during the first two tests.

== Touring squad ==
* Sub total included in games totals.

Player	Club	Position(s)	Games (sub)	Tests (sub)	Tries	Goals/ attempts	F/goals	Points
Tim Brasher	Balmain Tigers	Fullback, Wing	13 (4)	2 (2)	6	11/12	-	46
Bradley Clyde	Canberra Raiders	Second-row	7	3	5	-	-	20
Laurie Daley (vc)	Canberra Raiders	Five-eighth	9	4	5	1/2	-	22
Andrew Ettingshausen	Cronulla-Sutherland Sharks	Wing, Centre	10 (1)	4	15	-	-	60
David Fairleigh	North Sydney Bears	Second-row, Prop	13 (7)	2 (2)	5	-	-	20
Brad Fittler	Penrith Panthers	Lock	12 (1)	4	2	-	-	8
Greg Florimo	North Sydney Bears	Five-eighth, Lock, Centre	12 (5)	2 (2)	8	0/1	-	32
David Furner	Canberra Raiders	Second-row	10 (3)	2 (1)	2	24/31	-	56
Michael Hancock	Brisbane Broncos	Wing	7 (1)	0	2	-	-	8
Paul Harragon	Newcastle Knights	Prop	7 (2)	2 (1)	3	-	-	12
Terry Hill	Manly-Warringah Sea Eagles	Centre	8	0	7	-	-	28
Allan Langer	Brisbane Broncos	Halfback, Hooker	12 (4)	4 (3)	5	-	-	20
Glenn Lazarus	Brisbane Broncos	Prop	11 (1)	3	-	-	-	-
Paul McGregor	Illawarra Steelers	Centre	3	0	2	-	-	8
Mal Meninga (c)	Canberra Raiders	Centre	10	4	4	4/8	-	24
Steven Menzies	Manly-Warringah Sea Eagles	Second-row	10 (4)	0	9	-	-	36
Brett Mullins	Canberra Raiders	Fullback	11	4	11	-	-	44
Dean Pay	Canterbury-Bankstown Bulldogs	Prop, Second-row	11 (3)	3 (1)	4	-	-	16
Steve Renouf	Brisbane Broncos	Centre	9	4	12	-	-	48
Ian Roberts	Manly-Warringah Sea Eagles	Prop	9 (2)	4	1	-	-	4
Wendell Sailor	Brisbane Broncos	Wing	12 (3)	1	9	-	-	36
Jim Serdaris	Western Suburbs Magpies	Hooker	8	0	3	-	-	12
Paul Sironen	Balmain Tigers	Second-row, Prop	9 (1)	3 (1)	-	-	-	-
Jason Smith	Canterbury-Bankstown Bulldogs	Second-row, Lock, Prop	9	0	4	-	-	12
Ricky Stuart	Canberra Raiders	Halfback	12 (4)	4 (1)	1	-	1	5
Kevin Walters	Brisbane Broncos	Five-eighth, Halfback	9 (3)	0	2	-	-	8
Steve Walters	Canberra Raiders	Hooker	11 (3)	4	3	-	-	12
Rod Wishart	Illawarra Steelers	Wing	11 (1)	3	8	71/88	-	174

== By club ==
The touring side was represented by 20 New South Welshmen (N) and 8 Queenslanders (Q).

With captain Mal Meninga and vice-captain Laurie Daley both coming from the Canberra Raiders, this was the first time the Kangaroos captain and vice-captain had come from the same club since Reg Gasnier had captain-coached the 1967–68 Kangaroo tour with his St George teammate Johnny Raper as the nominated vice-captain.

During the tour in games where neither Meninga or Daley played (or they were on the bench), Bob Fulton handed the team captaincy to Paul Sironen (x1), Allan Langer (x3), Ricky Stuart (x1), Kevin Walters (x1) and Glenn Lazarus (x1). Tour vice-captain Daley never actually got to captain a run-on side during the tour.

- Canberra Raiders (7): Mal Meninga (captain) (Q), Laurie Daley (N) (vice-captain), Bradley Clyde (N), David Furner (N), Brett Mullins (N), Ricky Stuart (N), Steve Walters (Q)
- Brisbane Broncos (6): Michael Hancock (Q), Allan Langer (Q), Glenn Lazarus (N), Steve Renouf, (Q), Wendell Sailor (Q), Kevin Walters (Q)
- Manly-Warringah Sea Eagles (3): Terry Hill (N), Steven Menzies (N), Ian Roberts (N)
- Balmain Tigers (2): Tim Brasher (N), Paul Sironen (N)
- Canterbury-Bankstown Bulldogs (2): Dean Pay (N) Jason Smith (Q)
- Illawarra Steelers (2): Paul McGregor (N), Rod Wishart (N)
- North Sydney Bears (2): David Fairleigh (N), Greg Florimo (N)
- Cronulla-Sutherland Sharks (1): Andrew Ettingshausen (N)
- Newcastle Knights (1): Paul Harragon (N)
- Penrith Panthers (1): Brad Fittler (N)
- Western Suburbs Magpies (1): Jim Serdaris (N)

== Great Britain ==
The first match against Great Britain at London's Wembley Stadium featured pre-match entertainment by Cliff Richard.

The 1994 Ashes series again broke the record aggregate crowd for the series in Great Britain with 140,430 attending the three Tests, beating the record of 133,684 set on the 1990 Kangaroo Tour. As with the 1982, 1986 and 1990 tours, the game against Wigan at Central Park drew the biggest club game attendance of the Kangaroo Tour attracting 20,057 fans. The larger test attendances had been made possible by the use of England's 82,000 capacity national stadium (Wembley) as well as the use of larger capacity soccer stadiums Old Trafford and Elland Road rather than the traditional use of the larger club grounds such as Central Park, Headingley (Leeds) and Odsal Stadium (Bradford).

The Kangaroos played an international tour match against Wales at Ninian Park in Cardiff on 30 October wearing their non-Test Australian jumpers for the game (for the first time in Kangaroo Tour history, the Kangaroos non-Test jumpers included yellow hoops around the waist leaving the traditional jumper to be used only in the Tests). In the first meeting of the two nations since the 1982 Kangaroo tour, the Australians ran in eight tries to one in a 46–4 win, played on a heavy ground and in driving rain before 8,729 fans. The match proved to be spiteful and produced two dark spots. Welsh dual international John Devereux suffered a badly broken jaw after he accidentally collided with Mal Meninga's left shoulder when attempting to tackle the Australian captain. Later an all-in-brawl erupted after Kangaroos second-rower Paul Sironen reacted to a high tackle from Welsh halfback Kevin Ellis on Kangaroo halfback Allan Langer.

The 1994 Kangaroos scored 535 points on the British leg of the tour (96 tries, 75 goals, 1 field goal), while conceding only 108 points (17 tries, 20 goals).

=== Test venues ===
The three Ashes series tests took place at the following venues.

London	Manchester	Leeds
Wembley Stadium	Old Trafford	Elland Road
Capacity: 82,000	Capacity: 44,000	Capacity: 40,000

Sunday 2 October	Cumbria	8 – 52	Australia	Derwent Park, Workington
	Tries: Paul Burns; Goals: Dean Marwood (2)	[ Report]	Tries: David Fairleigh (2), Wendell Sailor (2), Paul McGregor, Tim Brasher, Steve Menzies, Ian Roberts, Jim Serdaris; Goals: Rod Wishart (8)	Attendance: 4,277; Referee: John Connolly; Player of the Match: Steve Menzies

Cumbria	Australia

FB	1	John Routledge
RW	2	David Seeds
RC	3	Kevin Pape (c)
LC	4	Paul Burns
LW	5	Jon Roper
SO	6	Martin Birkett
SH	7	Dean Marwood
PR	8	Jon Neill
HK	9	Steve McCurrie
PR	10	Russ Walker
SR	11	David Elliot
SR	12	Colin Armstrong
LF	13	Simon Knox
Substitutions:
IC	14	Lee Anderson
IC	15	Stephen Holgate
IC	16	Neil Shaw
IC	17	Leigh Smith
Coach:

FB	1	Tim Brasher
RW	2	Wendell Sailor
RC	3	Paul McGregor
LC	4	Terry Hill
LW	5	Rod Wishart
FE	6	Greg Florimo
HB	7	Kevin Walters
PR	8	Ian Roberts
HK	9	Jim Serdaris
PR	10	Glenn Lazarus
SR	11	Paul Sironen (c)
SR	12	Steve Menzies
LK	13	Brad Fittler
Substitutions:
IC	14	David Fairleigh
IC	15	Allan Langer
IC	16	Jason Smith
IC	17	Bradley Clyde
Coach:
(Australia) Bob Fulton

With the NSWRL Grand Final having been played only a week earlier, Kangaroos coach Bob Fulton rested the Canberra and Canterbury-Bankstown players for what would be Australia's only tour match against a full English county side (though both Jason Smith (Bulldogs) and Bradley Clyde (Canberra) were selected on the bench, but like Allan Langer, wasn't used by coach Fulton). Making their debuts in Australian colours were Wendell Sailor, Terry Hill, Greg Florimo, Jim Serdaris and Steve Menzies who was awarded the Man of the Match. Second rower Paul Sironen and making his 3rd Kangaroo Tour as a player (the record for a forward), captained the Kangaroos in the absence of Mal Meninga and Laurie Daley. Workington Town centre Kevin Pape was given the honour of captaining Cumbria in front of his home crowd in what was his Testimonial year.

Wednesday 5 October	Leeds	6 – 48	Australia	Headingley, Leeds
	Tries: Alan Tait; Goals: Francis Cummins (1)	[ Report]	Tries: Andrew Ettingshausen (3), Allan Langer (3), Steve Renouf, Mal Meninga, Steve Menzies; Goals: David Furner (6)	Attendance: 18,581; Referee: Russell Smith; Player of the Match: Brad Fittler

Leeds	Australia

FB	1	Alan Tait
RW	2	Jim Fallon
RC	3	Kevin Iro
LC	4	Craig Innes
LW	5	Francis Cummins
SO	6	Garry Schofield (c)
SH	7	Patrick Entat
PR	8	Neil Harmon
HK	9	James Lowes
PR	10	Esene Faimalo
SR	11	George Mann
SR	12	Richie Eyres
LF	13	Gary Mercer
Substitutions:
IC	14	Graham Holroyd
IC	15	Nick Fozzard
IC	16	Marcus Vassilakopoulos
IC	17
Coach:
(England) Doug Laughton

FB	1	Brett Mullins
RW	2	Andrew Ettingshausen
RC	3	Mal Meninga (c)
LC	4	Steve Renouf
LW	5	Michael Hancock
FE	6	Laurie Daley
HB	7	Allan Langer
PR	8	Dean Pay
HK	9	Jim Serdaris
PR	10	Paul Sironen
SR	11	David Furner
SR	12	Jason Smith
LK	13	Brad Fittler
Substitutions:
IC	14	Kevin Walters
IC	15	Wendell Sailor
IC	16	David Fairleigh
IC	17	Steve Menzies
Coach:
(Australia) Bob Fulton

The Kangaroos produced a powerhouse performance against Leeds with a 48–6 win at Headingley. As he had done during his first game on the 1990 Kangaroo tour, former Leeds player Andrew Ettingshausen crossed for a hat trick of tries, as did Allan Langer. Dean Pay, David Furner and Jason Smith made their green and gold debuts.

Saturday 8 October	Wigan	20 – 30	Australia	Central Park, Wigan
	Tries: Jason Robinson, Va'aiga Tuigamala, Gary Connolly, Martin Offiah; Goals: Frano Botica (1); Andy Farrell (1)	[ Report]	Tries: Bradley Clyde, Dean Pay, Laurie Daley, Steve Renouf, Michael Hancock, Brett Mullins; Goals: Mal Meninga (2); Laurie Daley (1)	Attendance: 20,057; Referee: David Campbell; Player of the Match: Dean Pay

Wigan	Australia

FB	1	Gary Connolly
RW	2	Jason Robinson
RC	3	Henry Paul
LC	4	Va'aiga Tuigamala
LW	5	Martin Offiah
SO	6	Frano Botica
SH	7	Shaun Edwards (c)
PR	8	Kelvin Skerrett
HK	9	Martin Hall
PR	10	Neil Cowie
SR	11	Denis Betts
SR	12	Andy Farrell
LF	13	Phil Clarke
Substitutions:
IC	14	Paul Atcheson
IC	15	Barrie McDermott
IC	16	Mick Cassidy
IC	17	Terry O'Connor
Coach:
(New Zealand) Graeme West

FB	1	Brett Mullins
RW	2	Wendell Sailor
RC	3	Mal Meninga (c)
LC	4	Steve Renouf
LW	5	Michael Hancock
FE	6	Laurie Daley
HB	7	Ricky Stuart
PR	8	Dean Pay
HK	9	Steve Walters
PR	10	Ian Roberts
SR	11	Paul Sironen
SR	12	Bradley Clyde
LK	13	Brad Fittler
Substitutions:
IC	14	Kevin Walters
IC	15	Tim Brasher
IC	16	David Fairleigh
IC	17	Steve Menzies
Coach:
(Australia) Bob Fulton

The Kangaroos controlled the first half against Wigan, leading 26–6 at half time with tries to Clyde, Pay, Daley (off what looked to be a forward pass from former Wigan import Ian Roberts), Renouf (a dazzling 52 metre run with neither Robinson nor Gary Connolly making any ground) and Hancock with only Jason Robinson scoring for the cherry and whites. Great Britain prop Kelvin Skerrett was sin-binned midway through the half for backchat after the use of a forearm on Paul Sironen who was attempting to tackle him. Following the restart after Hancock's try, Sironen, taking the hit up, was felled by an elbow to the head from Barrie McDermott who was put on report (and later suspended). Due to stoppages, the first half went almost 10 minutes longer than the regulation 40 minutes.

Former All Black Va'aiga Tuigamala scored a brilliant solo try soon after half time that brought the 20,057 crowd to its feet when he beat Meninga's attempted tackle and chipped ahead along the sideline and beat Sailor, Clyde and Mullins to the ball, but the Kangaroos hit straight back with a solo try to Brett Mullins from a poor Henry Paul kick and poor defence which allowed him to race 75 metres to score next to the posts and take the score to 30–10. But from there Wigan fought back with a try to Gary Connolly from a quick penalty tap and a late try to Martin Offiah to bring some respectability for the home side. After receiving a cut to the head in the first half fans were treated to the rare sight of Australian captain Mal Meninga wearing headgear for most of the game.

Wednesday 12 October	Castleford	12 – 38	Australia	Wheldon Road, Castleford
	Tries: Phil Eden, Richie Blackmore, Chris Smith; Goals: Lee Crooks (0/3)	[ Report]	Tries: Rod Wishart (2), Allan Langer, Andrew Ettingshausen, Paul McGregor, Kevin Walters, Jim Serdaris; Goals: Rod Wishart (5)	Attendance: 11,073; Referee: John Connolly; Player of the Match: Greg Florimo

Castleford	Australia

FB	1	Richard Goddard
RW	2	Chris Smith
RC	3	Richie Blackmore
LC	4	Phil Eden
LW	5	Jon Wray
SO	6	Tony Kemp
SH	7	Tony Smith
PR	8	Lee Crooks (c)
HK	9	Richard Russell
PR	10	Dean Sampson
SR	11	Martin Ketteridge
SR	12	Andy Hay
LF	13	Ian Smales
Substitutions:
IC	14	Paul Darley
IC	15	Nathan Sykes
IC	16	Lynton Morris
IC	17	Terry McAllister
Coach:
(England) John Joyner

FB	1	Tim Brasher
RW	2	Andrew Ettingshausen
RC	3	Terry Hill
LC	4	Paul McGregor
LW	5	Rod Wishart
FE	6	Kevin Walters
HB	7	Allan Langer (c)
PR	8	Glenn Lazarus
HK	9	Jim Serdaris
PR	10	Paul Harragon
SR	11	Jason Smith
SR	12	David Furner
LK	13	Greg Florimo
Substitutions:
IC	14	Ricky Stuart
IC	15	Wendell Sailor
IC	16	David Fairleigh
IC	17	Steve Menzies
Coach:
(Australia) Bob Fulton

With 38 points, the Kangaroos put on their biggest score against Castleford since defeating them 39–6 on the 1929–30 Kangaroo tour. Playing in the unfamiliar position of lock forward, Greg Florimo was judged as the Man of the Match.

Sunday 16 October	Halifax	12 – 26	Australia	Thrum Hall, Halifax
	Tries: John Bentley, Richard Smith; Goals: John Schuster (2/2)	[ Report]	Tries: Wendell Sailor (2), Bradley Clyde, Greg Florimo, Andrew Ettingshausen; Goals: Mal Meninga (2/4); Tim Brasher (1/2)	Attendance: 8,352; Referee: John Holdsworth; Player of the Match: Laurie Daley

Halifax	Australia

FB	1	Steve Hampson
RW	2	John Bentley
RC	3	John Schuster
LC	4	Graeme Hallas
LW	5	Mark Preston
SO	6	Michael Hagan
SH	7	Wayne Parker
PR	8	Karl Harrison (c)
HK	9	Roy Southernwood
PR	10	John Fieldhouse
SR	11	Paul Moriarty
SR	12	Mark Perrett
LF	13	Gary Divorty
Substitutions:
IC	14	Richard Smith
IC	15	Steve Greenwood
IC	16	Lee Harland
IC	17	Johnny Lawless
Coach:
(England) Steve Simms

FB	1	Brett Mullins
LW	2	Tim Brasher
RC	3	Mal Meninga (c)
LC	4	Andrew Ettingshausen
RW	5	Wendell Sailor
FE	6	Laurie Daley
HB	7	Ricky Stuart
PR	8	Glenn Lazarus
HK	9	Allan Langer
PR	10	Paul Harragon
SR	11	Paul Sironen
SR	12	Bradley Clyde
LK	13	Brad Fittler
Substitutions:
IC	14	Kevin Walters
IC	15	Greg Florimo
IC	16	Ian Roberts
IC	17	Dean Pay
Coach:
(Australia) Bob Fulton

With Kangaroos hooker Steve Walters being rested before the first test due to a back injury and his understudy Jim Serdaris unavailable due to a cracked rib suffered 4 days earlier against Castleford that sidelined him for two weeks, coach Bob Fulton had Ricky Stuart and Allan Langer playing halfback and hooker respectively in the first half before having them swap positions in the second.

Australia led Halifax 10–6 at half time thanks to tries from Wendell Sailor and Bradley Clyde and a Tim Brasher goal with Halifax's only score coming from a John Bentley try which was converted from the sideline by former All Blacks and Newcastle Knights centre John Schuster. However, second half tries to Greg Florimo, Andrew Ettingshausen and a second to Sailor saw the score blow out to 26–6 before a late try to replacement winger Richard Smith (converted by Schuster) saw the final score read 26–12 in Australia's favour.

The day prior to the game, the Kangaroos had a training session at Thrum Hall to get used to the ground which had a distinctive 3.6 metre slope from the grandstand wing to the outer side of the ground due to being built on the side of a hill. During this session Michael Hancock suffered an AC joint injury which would keep him out of action for 3 weeks and effectively end his test career. He was replaced in the run-on side by Tim Brasher who had originally been named on the bench. Coming into the side on the bench was Greg Florimo. Hancock's injury opened the door for his Brisbane Broncos teammate Wendell Sailor to make his test debut at Wembley 6 days later.

=== The Ashes series ===
==== 1st Test ====
The first Test of the 1994 Kangaroo Tour was again played at London's Wembley Stadium, and attracted 57,034 fans, a record Test Match crowd in England breaking the previous record of 54,569 who had attended the opening Ashes test at Wembley in 1990. This remained England's largest non-World Cup international rugby league attendance until the first test of the 2025 Kangaroo tour of England at Wembley.

New Lions coach Ellery Hanley, who had captained the team in the 1988 and 1990 Ashes series under the coach he replaced Mal Reilly, and was at the time still playing for Leeds, became the first black person to coach or manage a major national team of any sport in Great Britain. Australian coach Bob Fulton was in charge for his 25th test with a prior record of 21 wins, 2 losses and 1 draw. Five of the Australians (Mullins, Sailor, Daley, Roberts and Harragon) plus Pay and Furner on the bench had not previously played at Wembley.

Saturday, 22 October

Great Britain	8 – 4	Australia
Tries; Jonathan Davies; Goals; Jonathan Davies (1/2); Bobby Goulding (1/1)		Tries; Steve Renouf; Goals; David Furner (0/1)

Wembley Stadium, London
Attendance: 57,034
Referee: Graham Annesley (Australia)
Player of the Match: Jonathan Davies

Great Britain	Australia

FB	1	Jonathan Davies
RW	2	Jason Robinson
RC	3	Gary Connolly
LC	4	Alan Hunte
LW	5	Martin Offiah
SO	6	Daryl Powell
SH	7	Shaun Edwards (c)
PR	8	Karl Harrison
HK	9	Lee Jackson
PR	10	Chris Joynt
SR	11	Denis Betts
SR	12	Andy Farrell
LF	13	Phil Clarke
Substitutions:
IC	14	Bobby Goulding
IC	15	Barrie McDermott
IC	16	Allan Bateman
IC	17	Mick Cassidy
Coach:
(England) Ellery Hanley

FB	1	Brett Mullins
RW	2	Andrew Ettingshausen
RC	3	Mal Meninga (c)
LC	4	Steve Renouf
LW	5	Wendell Sailor
FE	6	Laurie Daley
HB	7	Allan Langer
PR	8	Ian Roberts
HK	9	Steve Walters
PR	10	Paul Harragon
SR	11	Paul Sironen
SR	12	Bradley Clyde
LK	13	Brad Fittler
Substitutions:
IC	14	Ricky Stuart
IC	15	Tim Brasher
IC	16	Dean Pay
IC	17	David Furner
Coach:
(Australia) Bob Fulton

Despite Great Britain captain and halfback Shaun Edwards being sent off after 25 minutes for a high tackle on Australian second rower Bradley Clyde, the Lions put in another brilliant performance at Wembley and, as they had done in the first Test of the 1990 Kangaroo Tour, defeated the Kangaroos 8–4. Lions fullback Jonathan Davies put in a Man of the Match performance, including a 50-metre solo try in the first half after being put into a gap by Denis Betts then outpacing Australian fullback Brett Mullins to score in the corner. Davies was also a solid last line of defence, repelling many breaks by the Kangaroos, until he dived on a loose ball close to his line and was fallen on by teammate Barrie McDermott, resulting a dislocated shoulder midway through the second half. This saw him leave the field and later be ruled out for the rest of the series as well as Wales' game against the Kangaroos before the second Ashes test.

Typical of Davies' play on the day, midway through the second half Kangaroos lock Brad Fittler made a break down the middle of the field only 25 metres out with Allan Langer in support and only the Lions fullback to beat. Fittler passed to Langer who should have had a clear 15 metre run to the line, however Davies had anticipated that Fittler would pass and made the decision to go for Langer, bringing the Australian halfback down in a try saving tackle. As Langer was tackled, Fittler threw his arms up in disbelief, realising that if he had thrown a dummy he would likely have scored untouched under the posts with the closest defender being Chris Joynt who was over 3 metres behind. Davies wasn't the only star defender for the Lions though as the entire team made up for only having 12 players and repelled all but one of the Kangaroos many attacking raids. Most of the play in the second half saw Australia virtually camped inside the Lions 30 metre zone, but the commitment on the day shown by the 12 man line was what won the day for the home side.

As he did at Wembley in the 1992 World Cup final, Steve Renouf crossed for Australia's only try of the game late in the second half. Replacement forward David Furner, making his test debut, had a sideline conversion to tie the game at 6–all but his kick sailed wide of the posts. Replacement halfback Bobbie Goulding, who had come on to replace Andy Farrell after Edwards' send-off, then kicked penalty goal in injury time to give the Lions a well deserved 8–4 win.

After coming off following the hit by Edwards, Bradley Clyde returned to the game in the first half, but did not return to the game in the second half. While walking with Canberra Raiders teammate Ricky Stuart in the Wembley tunnel to the change rooms at half time, Clyde collapsed and was taken to hospital for a precautionary CT scan. He was given the all-clear by the doctors but required a second scan the next morning after waking up still slightly dazed.

Wednesday 26 October	Sheffield Eagles	2 – 80	Australia	Don Valley Stadium, Sheffield
	Tries: Goals: David Mycoe (1/1)	[ Report]	Tries: Andrew Ettingshausen (3), Steve Menzies (2), Brett Mullins (2), Steve Walters (2), Greg Florimo, Tim Brasher, Dean Pay, Rod Wishart, Kevin Walters; Goals: Rod Wishart (12/14)	Attendance: 7,423; Referee: Ray Tennant; Player of the Match: Ricky Stuart

Sheffield	Australia

FB	1	Brad Hayes
RW	2	Lynton Stott
RC	3	Richard Price
LC	4	Mark Gamson
LW	5	Richard Picksley
SO	6	David Mycoe
SH	7	Ryan Sheridan
PR	8	Paul Broadbent
HK	9	Darren Turner
PR	10	Alex Thompson
SR	11	Paul Carr
SR	12	Ian Hughes
LF	13	Anthony Farrell (c)
Substitutions:
IC	14	Karl Randall
IC	15	Bright Sodje
IC	16	Carl Briggs
IC	17	Alan Boothroyd
Coach:
(England) Gary Hetherington

FB	1	Brett Mullins
LW	2	Tim Brasher
LC	3	Paul McGregor
RC	4	Terry Hill
RW	5	Rod Wishart
FE	6	Kevin Walters
HB	7	Ricky Stuart (c)
PR	8	Glenn Lazarus
HK	9	Steve Walters
PR	10	Dean Pay
SR	11	David Fairleigh
SR	12	Steve Menzies
LK	13	Jason Smith
Substitutions:
IC	14	Andrew Ettingshausen
IC	15	Greg Florimo
IC	16
IC	17	Wendell Sailor
Coach:
(Australia) Bob Fulton

The Kangaroos took out their frustration at having lost the first test at Wembley on the hapless Sheffield Eagles at the Don Valley Stadium. In their highest score since defeating Bramley 92–7 at the Barley Mow ground during the 1921–22 Kangaroo tour, the Aussies ran in 14 tries to nil in humiliating the home side 80–2. Sheffield's only score came early in the first half from a penalty goal by David Mycoe. Australian centre Paul McGregor suffered a hamstring injury unfortunately which ended his tour. His replacement Andrew Ettingshausen would cross for 3 of Australia's 14 tries, his last being a 90-metre run where Eagles winger Lynton Stott failed to make any ground on him.

After having defeated the Eagles 52–22 at Don Valley during their mini 1992 Rugby League World Cup final tour, this gave Australia a 132–24 for and against record in the only 2 games they would ever play against Sheffield.

=== Wales ===
The Kangaroos played a fully recognised senior international match against Wales at Ninian Park in Cardiff in what was the first meeting of the two countries since the 1982 Kangaroo tour when Australia won 37–7 at the same venue.

Sunday, 30 October

Wales	4 – 46	Australia
Tries: Daio Powell Goals:		Tries: Steve Renouf (2); Brett Mullins; Rod Wishart; Mal Meninga; Greg Florimo; Brad Fittler; David Furner; Goals: Rod Wishart (7/9)

Ninian Park, Cardiff
Attendance: 8,729
Referee: John Connolly (England)
Player of the Match: Brad Fittler

Wales	Australia

FB	1	Phil Ford
LW	2	Anthony Sullivan
RC	3	Scott Gibbs
LC	4	John Devereux
RW	5	Adrian Hadley
SO	6	Iestyn Harris
SH	7	Kevin Ellis
PR	8	Dai Young (c)
HK	9	Jonathan Griffiths
PR	10	Ian Marlow
SR	11	Paul Moriarty
SR	12	Rowland Phillips
LF	13	Mark Perrett
Substitutions:
IC	14	Gerald Cordle
IC	15	Jason Lee
IC	16	Richard Webster
IC	17	Daio Powell
Coach:
(Wales) Clive Griffiths

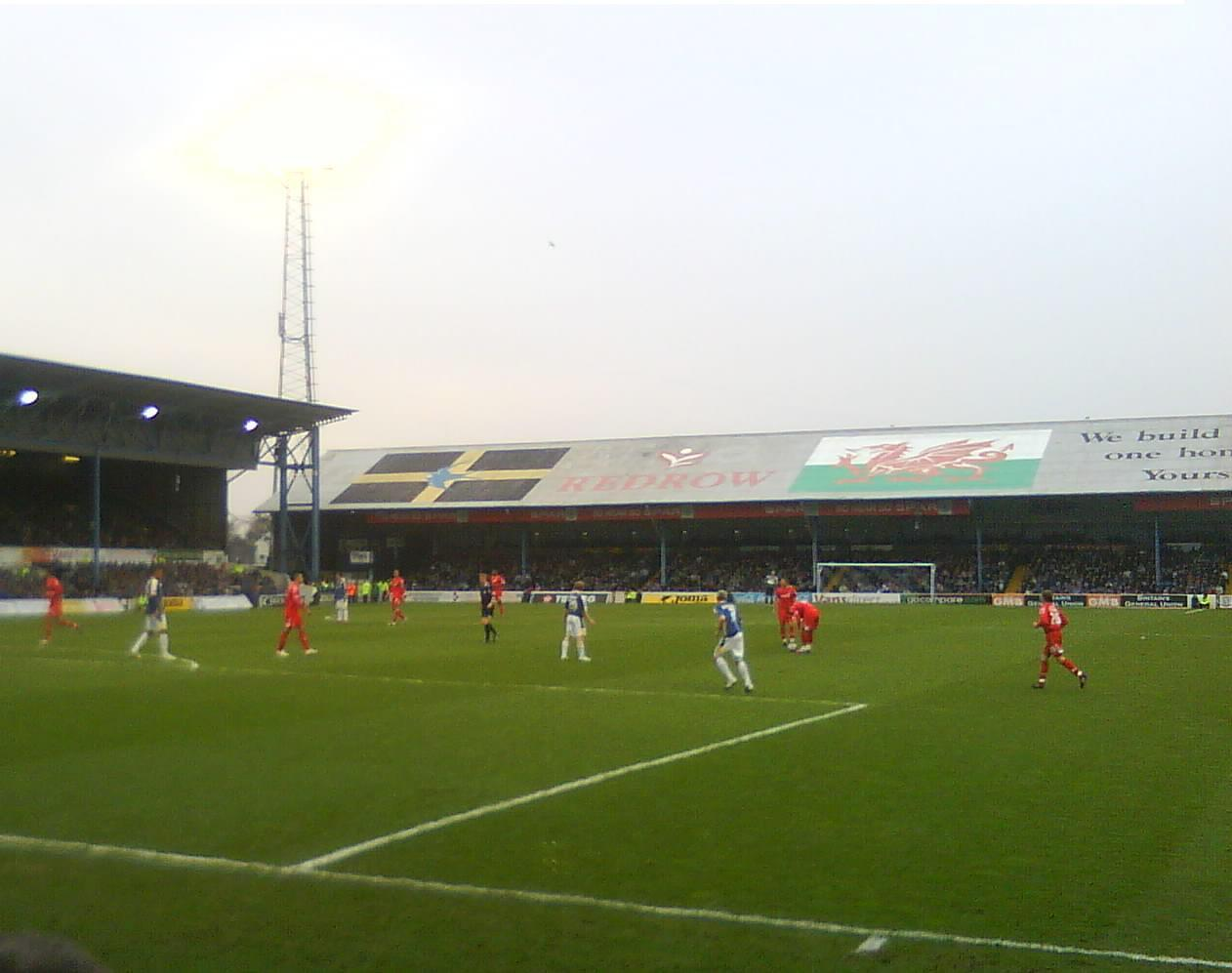

FB	1	Brett Mullins
RW	2	Rod Wishart
RC	3	Mal Meninga (c)
LC	4	Steve Renouf
LW	5	Wendell Sailor
FE	6	Kevin Walters
HB	7	Allan Langer
PR	8	Glenn Lazarus
HK	9	Steve Walters
PR	10	Ian Roberts
SR	11	Paul Sironen
SR	12	David Furner
LK	13	Brad Fittler
Substitutions:
IC	14	Greg Florimo
IC	15	Ricky Stuart
IC	16	David Fairleigh
IC	17	Paul Harragon
Coach:
(Australia) Bob Fulton

Although the Kangaroos were facing another country in Wales, the match was not given test status. Indeed, the Kangaroos wore their tour jumpers for the game and not their test jumpers.

The match, played in wet and muddy conditions in Cardiff, saw the Kangaroos lead by 30–0 at half time which virtually destroyed the match as a contest. In the second half the game descended into a spiteful affair with several all-in brawls. For Welsh dual rugby international centre John Devereux the match was largely forgettable. Nine minutes into the game he attempted to tackle Australian captain Mal Meninga but unfortunately came into contact with Meninga's shoulder. All agreed that the contact was accidental, but the impact broke Devereux's jaw in two places.

Although they were also without their superstar and inspirational captain Jonathan Davies who had dislocated his right shoulder in the first Ashes Test just 8 days earlier at Wembley, the Welsh team still boasted plenty of international rugby league experience with players like Phil Ford, Anthony Sullivan, John Devereux, Kevin Ellis, Jonathan Griffiths, Paul Moriarty and Rowland Phillips. In Davies' absence, the Dragons were captained by front row forward Dai Young. For the Australian's, only Greg Florimo had yet to play test football.

Tuesday 1 November	St. Helens	14 – 32	Australia	Knowsley Road, St. Helens
	Tries: Andy Haigh, Bernard Dwyer; Goals: Tommy Martyn (3/4)	[ Report]	Tries: Jason Smith, Andrew Ettingshausen, Tim Brasher, Wendell Sailor, Rod Wishart; Goals: Rod Wishart (6/7)	Attendance: 13,911; Referee: Colin Morris; Player of the Match: Tim Brasher

St Helens	Australia

FB	1	Steve Prescott
RW	2	Andy Haigh
RC	3	Scott Gibbs
LC	4	Chris Arkwright
LW	5	Anthony Sullivan
SO	6	Tommy Martyn
SH	7	Shane Cooper (c)
PR	8	Jon Neill
HK	9	Phil Veivers
PR	10	Adam Fogerty
SR	11	Ian Pickavance
SR	12	Sonny Nickle
LF	13	Apollo Perelini
Substitutions:
IC	14	Bernard Dwyer
IC	15	Andy Dannatt
IC	16	Jonathan Griffiths
IC	17
Coach:
(England) Eric Hughes

FB	1	Tim Brasher
RW	2	Rod Wishart
LC	3	Andrew Ettingshausen
RC	4	Terry Hill
LW	5	Wendell Sailor
FE	6	Greg Florimo
HB	7	Kevin Walters (c)
PR	8	Paul Sironen
HK	9	Jim Serdaris
PR	10	Paul Harragon
SR	11	Steve Menzies
SR	12	David Fairleigh
LK	13	Jason Smith
Substitutions:
IC	14	Dean Pay
IC	15	David Furner
IC	16	Mal Meninga
IC	17	Ricky Stuart
Coach:
(Australia) Bob Fulton

Although Kevin Walters captained the Kangaroos against St Helens, tour captain Mal Meninga (a former St Helens player) was part of Australia's bench for the game, though both he and Ricky Stuart were not used by coach Fulton. While Rod Wishart was lining up to convert Andrew Ettingshausen's first half try (and his 9th tour try in just 6 games. The only game he'd played and hadn't scored in was the 1st Test), Kevin Walters was sin-binned by referee Colin Morris during the first half for persistent backchat. Paul Sironen, playing in the front row for this match, was sent off midway through the second half for doing a hit-up with a raised elbow as he hit the Saints defensive line.

Although eventually well beaten on the scoreboard, St Helens pushed the midweek Kangaroos hard and actually led 8–6 midway through the first half thanks to Andy Haigh's try and two penalty goals from stand-off Tommy Martyn.

==== 2nd Test ====
With Lions captain Shaun Edwards out suspended for his high tackle on Bradley Clyde in the first Test, the captaincy was handed to his Wigan teammate Phil Clarke. On the morning of the match, reserve Australian forward David Fairleigh was forced to withdraw from the team with a virus that had swept through the Kangaroos squad in the days leading up to the game. He was replaced on the bench by veteran Paul Sironen (who had been cleared by the RFL Judiciary after his send-off against St Helens. Even players from international touring teams were required to face the judiciary if they had been sent-off in a game) in what would prove to be his 20th test for Australia and his 8th and last against Great Britain.

In defense of The Ashes, the Kangaroos came out firing, scoring seven tries to one, kick-started by captain Mal Meninga's 70 metre intercept run off a Bobby Goulding pass. Meninga put Andrew Ettingshausen, who beat the cover of Denis Betts and Graham Steadman, in for his 10th try of the tour with a perfectly timed pass just as flying Lions winger Martin Offiah was about to tackle him. From there, the floodgates opened and the only question was how much would the Kangaroos win by. Rod Wishart made a welcome return to the Test team for the first time since the 10–33 loss to the Lions in Melbourne in the 2nd Ashes Test of the 1992 Great Britain Lions tour. Wishart's goal kicking proving invaluable as he booted seven goals from nine attempts, while he also justified selection on form by also making a number of line breaks.

Kangaroos front row forward Ian Roberts was forced from the field midway through the first half with a deep gash above his right eye. Roberts had gone low to tackle Denis Betts who in the process of trying to break the tackle, accidentally stepped on the Australian prop's head. The injury would keep Roberts from playing again until the 3rd Test in Leeds.

Saturday, 5 November

Great Britain	8 – 38	Australia
Tries; Paul Newlove Goals; Bobby Goulding (2/3)		Tries; Brett Mullins (2); Andrew Ettingshausen; Bradley Clyde; Laurie Daley; Steve Renouf; Goals; Rod Wishart (7/9)

Old Trafford, Manchester
Attendance: 43,930
Referee: Graham Annesley (Australia)
Player of the Match: Brad Fittler

Great Britain	Australia

FB	1	Graham Steadman
RW	2	Jason Robinson
RC	3	Gary Connolly
LC	4	Alan Hunte
LW	5	Martin Offiah
SO	6	Daryl Powell
SH	7	Bobby Goulding
PR	8	Karl Harrison
HK	9	Lee Jackson
PR	10	Chris Joynt
SR	11	Denis Betts
SR	12	Andy Farrell
LF	13	Phil Clarke (c)
Substitutions:
IC	14	Garry Schofield
IC	15	Barrie McDermott
IC	16	Paul Newlove
IC	17	Mick Cassidy
Coach:
(England) Ellery Hanley

FB	1	Brett Mullins
RW	2	Andrew Ettingshausen
RC	3	Mal Meninga (c)
LC	4	Steve Renouf
LW	5	Rod Wishart
FE	6	Laurie Daley
HB	7	Ricky Stuart
PR	8	Glenn Lazarus
HK	9	Steve Walters
PR	10	Ian Roberts
SR	11	Dean Pay
SR	12	Bradley Clyde
LK	13	Brad Fittler
Substitutions:
IC	14	Tim Brasher
IC	15	Allan Langer
IC	16	Greg Florimo
IC	17	Paul Sironen
Coach:
(Australia) Bob Fulton

Before Ettingshausen's opening try, Goulding and Wishart (2 each) traded penalty goals. Following the try, the Kangaroos began to cut loose in defence of The Ashes. Bradley Clyde powered his way over after a Ricky Stuart mid-field bomb had been left alone by the Lions defence with some quick hands keeping the ball alive before Clyde powered over despite the attentions of Chris Joynt and Gary Connolly on the line. And minutes later a 60-metre break by Wishart before being brought down by a desperate Connolly had the British defence in tatters allowing Stuart and Man of the Match Brad Fittler to combined to send Brett Mullins under the posts for his first try of the series and to give Australia a match winning 18–4 half time lead. Great Britain's only score in the first half came from those two penalty goals by Bobbie Goulding.

Soon after half time and with Australia attacking the Great Britain line, Laurie Daley raced through a huge gap between Lee Jackson and Karl Harrison to score next to the posts and further Australia's lead to 24–4. The Lions then began to come alive thanks to enterprising play by veteran replacement pivot Garry Schofield who sent fellow replacement back Paul Newlove over for the Lions only try of the game. However, the fightback was short-lived as 10 minutes later Connolly sprinted out of the Lions defensive line trying to shut down Daley but only created a gap exploited by an on debut Greg Florimo who sent the ball back inside to Steve Renouf who jogged in for an easy try. Wishart's conversion, his 5th goal of the game, brought up his 100th point on tour in just his 6th game. Daley then put a scare in the Australian camp when he hurt his knee sliding over an exposed sprinkler head behind the dead ball line while attempting to score at the Stretford End of Old Trafford (the injury prompted questions over his decision to slide as he was almost 5 metres behind the ball and no chance of scoring), but just moments later Mal Meninga capped off a welcome return to form after a poor game at Wembley with a perfectly placed over the shoulder pass that sent Brett Mullins on a 65-metre run to score his second try of the game under the posts giving Australia a comprehensive 38–8 win and keeping the series alive going to Elland Road in Leeds for the deciding test.

Wednesday 9 November	Warrington	0 – 24	Australia	Wilderspool Stadium, Warrington
	Tries: Goals:	[ Report]	Tries: Wendell Sailor (2), Steve Menzies, Tim Brasher, Terry Hill; Goals: David Furner (2)	Attendance: 11,244; Referee: Robert Connolly; Player of the Match: Jason Smith

Warrington	Australia

FB	1	Lee Penny
RW	2	Mark Forster
RC	3	Iestyn Harris
LC	4	Jon Roper
LW	5	Jason Lee
SO	6	Francis Maloney
SH	7	Greg Mackey (c)
PR	8	Gary Tees
HK	9	Tukere Barlow
PR	10	Bruce McGuire
SR	11	Paul Cullen
SR	12	Gary Sanderson
LF	13	Paul Derbyshire
Substitutions:
IC	14	Chris Rudd
IC	15	Andrew Bennett
IC	16	Mark Hilton
IC	17	Phil Sumner
Coach:
(Australia) Brian Johnson

FB	1	Tim Brasher
LW	2	Wendell Sailor
LC	3	Terry Hill
RC	4	Greg Florimo
RW	5	Michael Hancock
FE	6	Kevin Walters
HB	7	Allan Langer (c)
PR	8	Paul Sironen
HK	9	Jim Serdaris
PR	15	David Fairleigh
SR	11	David Furner
SR	12	Steve Menzies
LK	13	Jason Smith
Substitutions:
IC	10	Glenn Lazarus
IC	14
IC	16
IC	17
Coach:
(Australia) Bob Fulton

This was the first time the Kangaroos had kept their opposition scoreless on tour and the first time the Kangaroos had kept an English club or county side scoreless since defeating Leeds 40–0 on the 1986 Kangaroo tour. Terry Hill scored his first try in Australian colours, a 40-metre solo effort, in a match played in light rain. Midway through the second half with the game lost, several Warrington players began to put swinging arms into their tackles, a tactic that went unpunished by referee Robert Connolly and his touch judges.

Sunday 13 November	Bradford Northern	0 – 40	Australia	Odsal Stadium, Bradford
	Tries: Goals:	[ Report]	Tries: Jason Smith (2), Steve Renouf, Bradley Clyde, Andrew Ettingshausen, Michael Hancock, Rod Wishart, David Fairleigh; Goals: Rod Wishart (4/8)	Attendance: 9,080; Referee: Stuart Cummings; Player of the Match: Bradley Clyde

Bradford Northern	Australia

FB	1	Roger Simpson
RW	2	Carl Hall
RC	3	David Fraisse
LC	4	Paul Newlove
LW	5	David Myers
SO	6	Neil Summers
SH	7	Deryck Fox (c)
PR	8	Roy Powell
HK	9	Phil Russell
PR	10	Jason Clegg
SR	11	Adam Greenwood
SR	12	Brian McDermott
LF	13	Paul Medley
Substitutions:
IC	14	John Donohue
IC	15	David Heron
IC	16	John Hamer
IC	17	Carl Winterburn
Coach:
(England) Peter Fox

FB	1	Brett Mullins
RW	2	Andrew Ettingshausen
LC	3	Mal Meninga (c)
RC	4	Steve Renouf
LW	5	Rod Wishart
FE	6	Laurie Daley
HB	7	Ricky Stuart
PR	8	Glenn Lazarus
HK	9	Steve Walters
PR	10	Dean Pay
SR	11	Jason Smith
SR	12	Bradley Clyde
LK	13	Brad Fittler
Substitutions:
IC	14	Allan Langer
IC	15	Michael Hancock
IC	16	David Furner
IC	17	David Fairleigh
Coach:
(Australia) Bob Fulton

This was the second 'clean sheet' in a row for the Kangaroos who defeated Bradford Northern 40–0. It was also the second game in succession against Bradford at Odsal Stadium where they had kept the home side scoreless having also achieved this during the 1986 tour when the Kangaroos won 38–0 (the 1990 Kangaroos had not played Bradford as part of their tour itinerary). Team captain Mal Meninga was the only member of the 1986 side that had won at Odsal to also play in 1994. Kangaroos second row forward Paul Sironen (making his 3rd Kangaroo Tour) had also played in the 1986 win, but wasn't in the side for the 1994 game. In the wet and muddy conditions at Odsal (and largely thanks to most of the Kangaroos tries being scored in the corners of the ground), Rod Wishart had his worst kicking game of the Kangaroo Tour landing only 4 of his 8 kicks at goal.

This match marked the Kangaroos 50th consecutive wins against English club and county teams. The Kangaroos last loss to an English club or county side had been when they went down 11–10 to Widnes on 25 October 1978, the 9th game of the 1978 Kangaroo tour.

Tuesday 15 November	Great Britain U/21	10 – 54	Australia	Gateshead International Stadium, Gateshead
	Tries: Steve Prescott; Goals: Steve Prescott (3/3)	[ Report]	Tries: Greg Florimo (2), Terry Hill (2), Allan Langer, David Fairleigh, Steve Menzies, Tim Brasher, Andrew Ettingshausen; Goals: David Furner (9/9)	Attendance: 4,118; Referee: Steve Presley; Player of the Match: David Fairleigh

Great Britain U/21	Australia

FB	1	Steve Prescott
RW	2	Chris Smith
RC	3	Richard Goddard
LC	4	Karle Hammond
LW	5	Francis Cummins
SO	6	Nigel Wright
SH	7	Ryan Sheridan
PR	8	Alex Thompson (c)
HK	9	John Clarke
PR	10	Mark Hilton
SR	11	Mark Perrett
SR	12	Lee Harland
LF	13	Scott Martin
Substitutions:
IC	14	Mark Hewitt
IC	15	Nathan McAvoy
IC	16	Jez Cassidy
IC	17	Nathan Sykes
Coach:
(England) Gary Hetherington

FB	1	Tim Brasher
RW	2	Wendell Sailor
LC	3	Terry Hill
RC	14	Andrew Ettingshausen
LW	5	Michael Hancock
FE	6	Kevin Walters
HB	7	Allan Langer (c)
PR	11	Jason Smith
HK	9	Jim Serdaris
PR	10	David Fairleigh
SR	4	Steve Menzies
SR	12	David Furner
LK	13	Greg Florimo
Substitutions:
IC	8	Brad Fittler
IC	15	Rod Wishart
IC	16
IC	17
Coach:
(Australia) Bob Fulton

Bob Fulton tinkered with the side on the last midweek game of the British part of the tour. Steve Menzies was to start in the centres with Brad Fittler picked in the front row!! However, before kick-off Fulton changed his mind with Andrew Ettingshausen coming off the bench to start at centre, Jason Smith was moved to the front row to accommodate Menzies moving to the back row while Fittler was moved to the bench.

Against the best of Britain's young players, the Kangaroos ran in nine tries to one to defeat the Great Britain Under-21 side 54–10 at the Gateshead International Stadium. Second rower David Furner, the son of 1956–57 Kangaroo tourist and the 1986 tour head coach Don Furner, kicked 9 goals from 9 attempts on the night. 20 year old St Helens fullback Steve Prescott scored all of the points for the Lions U/21's with a try and 3 goals. Kangaroos fullback Tim Brasher was sent to the sin-bin twice by referee Steve Presley, once in each half .

This was the first time that the Kangaroos had faced a "Junior" Great Britain team since defeating the Great Britain U/24's 30–8 at Craven Park in Hull on the third game of the 1978 Kangaroo tour. 1994 Kangaroos coach Bob Fulton had been the Kangaroos captain that day in 1978.

==== 3rd Test ====
Great Britain coach Ellery Hanley made a number of changes for the third test. In the press before the game there was speculation that Hanley would actually play Phil Clarke at five-eighth and himself at lock, though most were questioning why the man who sparked the Lions in the second test, former captain Garry Schofield, wasn't in the starting side (it was rumoured that personal differences between Leeds teammates Hanley and Schofield dating back to Schofield retaining the Lions captaincy over Hanley for the 1992 World Cup final is what kept Schofield not only out of the first test team, but on the Lions bench for the final two games). The Lions changes for the decider were: Graham Steadman was dropped and Gary Connolly moved from the centres to his preferred fullback with Paul Newlove moving from the bench to replace Connolly in the centres. Shaun Edwards returned from suspension to captain the side, demoting Bobby Goulding to the bench. Phil Clarke did play 5/8 with Darryl Powell moved to the bench, Chris Joynt from the front row to lock with prop Barrie McDermott coming into the run on side, while pacey St. Helens back rower Sonny Nickle came into the team on the bench replacing Mick Cassidy. Kangaroos coach Bob Fulton made just one change to the side that had comprehensively won the second test with David Fairleigh coming onto the bench for his second test to replace 20 test veteran Paul Sironen. Fairleigh had originally been chosen over Sironen for the second test but had fallen ill on the day of the game which saw the giant Balmain forward brought back into the side.

Sunday 20 November

Great Britain	4 – 23	Australia
Tries Goals; Andy Farrell (2/2)		Tries; Laurie Daley; Rod Wishart; Steve Walters; Dean Pay; Goals; Rod Wishart (3/4); Field Goals; Ricky Stuart (1)

Elland Road, Leeds
Attendance: 39,468
Referee: Bill Harrigan (Australia)
Player of the Match: Steve Walters

Great Britain	Australia

FB	1	Gary Connolly
RW	2	Jason Robinson
RC	3	Alan Hunte
LC	4	Paul Newlove
LW	5	Martin Offiah
SO	6	Phil Clarke
SH	7	Shaun Edwards (c)
PR	8	Karl Harrison
HK	9	Lee Jackson
PR	10	Barrie McDermott
SR	11	Denis Betts
SR	12	Andy Farrell
LF	13	Chris Joynt
Substitutions:
IC	14	Bobby Goulding
IC	15	Daryl Powell
IC	16	Garry Schofield
IC	17	Sonny Nickle
Coach:
(England) Ellery Hanley

FB	1	Brett Mullins
RW	2	Andrew Ettingshausen
RC	3	Mal Meninga (c)
LC	4	Steve Renouf
LW	5	Rod Wishart
FE	6	Laurie Daley
HB	7	Ricky Stuart
PR	8	Glenn Lazarus
HK	9	Steve Walters
PR	10	Ian Roberts
SR	11	Dean Pay
SR	12	Bradley Clyde
LK	13	Brad Fittler
Substitutions:
IC	14	Allan Langer
IC	15	Tim Brasher
IC	16	Greg Florimo
IC	17	David Fairleigh
Coach:
(Australia) Bob Fulton

Ironically, Ellery Hanley's plan to use Phil Clarke as Great Britain's stand-off came to naught when Clarke suffered a bad ankle injury and was forced off about 10 minutes into the game. This saw Garry Schofield come on for his 46th and final test for Great Britain.

Although the Australian's kept the Lions tryless for the game, the third test was a genuine contest and the 23–4 scoreline didn't tell the whole story and it wasn't until late in the game that Australia put the result beyond doubt. Laurie Daley opened the scoring midway through the first half with a try from his own kick. Near the Great Britain line he chip kicked over Paul Newlove who got a hand to the ball but it deflected up perfectly for the Australian vice-captain who caught the ball and stepped past a wrong footed Gary Connolly, putting it down untouched next to the posts. Wishart's easy conversion gave the Australian's a 6–0 lead before a 40-metre Andy Farrell penalty goal saw the score 6–2. Ricky Stuart then slotted a 39th minute field goal to see the Kangaroos go into half time with a 7–2 lead.

Wishart was next to score following a long pass by Daley. The Illawarra winger took the pass flat footed, but was able to step inside Paul Newlove to score in the corner. He missed converting his own try and Australia led 11–2. Farrell then kicked a second penalty goal to bring the score to 11–4, but that was as close as the Lions would get. Play then went back and forth with both sides making breaks but were unable to capitalise. Sonny Nickle made a long break but was eventually brought down by Mullins and Ettingshausen. This left Channel 9 Australia guest commentator, former Lions great Alex Murphy, wondering "What if?" that had been Martin Offiah who to his credit had been actively looking to get more involved in the game after heavy criticism of his poor performance at Old Trafford. Steve Walters, who had made 2 of the Kangaroos line breaks including one that led to Wishart's try, then confirmed himself as Man of the Match when he ran from dummy half and pushed through 3 defenders to score beside the posts with Wishart's conversion giving the Kangaroos a match winning 17–4 lead. Dean Pay then scored his first test try to put the result beyond doubt and ensure Australia kept alive its streak of winning every Ashes series in England since 1963–64. Stuart looked like scoring his first try but was tackled short of the line. However he was able to get a flick pass away to Pay who scored under the posts giving Wishart an easy conversion to give the Australian's a match winning 23–4 lead.

Midway through the second half, Kangaroos centre Steve Renouf had a golden opportunity to join a select band of Australians who had scored a try in each test of an Ashes series, but inexplicably dropped a simple inside pass from Bradley Clyde less than 2 metres from the line with no one near him. Had he scored he would have joined legendary winger Ken Irvine (1962 and 1963), Sam Backo (1988) and Mal Meninga (1990) on that list of players.

The attendance of 39,468 remains (as of 2024) the record for a rugby league international and a rugby league match played at Elland Road. It is also the record attendance for either rugby league or Rugby Union at Elland Road.

As he had announced his retirement prior to the end of the 1994 NSWRL season, this was Australian captain Mal Meninga's last game in England. Meninga had made a record four Kangaroo Tours in his career, the only player to do so, and had captained the squad twice, also the only player to do so. Meninga had played 49 games over the four tours (winning 47), including all 12 Ashes tests (winning 10), and scored a total of 304 points (31 tries*, 95 goals) and was the leading point scorer on the 1982 Kangaroo tour with 166 points (10 tries, 68 goals). Note: Meninga's 10 tries scored on the 1982 tour were when they were worth 3 points. With points adjusted to 4 points per try, Meninga scored a total of 314 points. The Australian captain also had a short, but successful stint in English club football with St Helens in 1984-85, helping Saints to a 36–16 Premiership Final win over Hull Kingston Rovers at Elland Road, and a 26–18 win over Wigan in the Lancashire Cup Final at Central Park. Meninga scored try doubles in both Finals including a memorable length of the field try in the Premiership Final.

== French leg ==
Thursday 24 November	President's XIII	17 – 42	Australia	Stade Robert Bobin, Bondoufle
	Tries: S. Mullins, F. Banquet; Goals: F. Banquet (4); Field Goal: S. Mullins		Tries: Terry Hill (2), Greg Florimo (2), Brett Mullins, Jim Serdaris, David Furner; Goals: David Furner (7)	Attendance: 1,500; Referee: M. Chanfreau

Sunday 27 November	Catalans Selection	16 – 60	Australia	Stade Gilbert Brutus, Perpignan
	Tries: Eric Van Brussel, F. Serret, F. Gomez, Goals: Patrick Torreilles (2)	[ Report]	Tries: Steve Renouf (3), Brett Mullins (2), Mal Meninga, Laurie Daley, Jason Smith, Bradley Clyde, Steve Menzies, Brad Fittler; Goals: Rod Wishart (8)	Attendance: 4,000; Referee: C. Alba

Australia: Brett Mullins, Michael Hancock, Steve Renouf, Mal Meninga (c), Rod Wishart, Laurie Daley, Ricky Stuart, Glenn Lazarus, Allan Langer, Dean Pay, Jason Smith, Bradley Clyde, Brad Fittler. Res - Steve Walters, Ian Roberts, Steve Menzies, Tim Brasher

Wednesday 30 November	France XIII	9 – 64	Australia	Stade de Fargues, Avignon
	Tries: Goals: S. Millet (4) Field Goal: Pascal Mons	[ Report]	Tries: Steve Menzies (2), Wendell Sailor (2), Terry Hill (2), Paul Harragon (2), Greg Florimo, Dean Pay, Tim Brasher; Goals: Tim Brasher (10)	Attendance: 1,500; Referee: G. Vigouroux

Australia: Tim Brasher, Wendell Sailor, Steve Menzies, Terry Hill, Michael Hancock, Greg Florimo, Kevin Walters, Glenn Lazarus (c), Jim Serdaris, Paul Harragon, David Fairleigh, Dean Pay, Jason Smith. Res - Ricky Stuart, Steve Walters

=== Test match ===
This would be the last time Australia played France in a test match until 21 November 2004.

Sunday 4 December

France	0 – 74	Australia
Tries Goals		Tries; Andrew Ettingshausen (3); Brett Mullins (2); Steve Renouf (2); Rod Wishart; Laurie Daley; Ricky Stuart; Paul Harragon; David Fairleigh; Mal Meninga; Goals; Rod Wishart (11/13)

Stade de la Méditerranée, Béziers
Attendance: 6,000
Referee: Bill Harrigan (Australia)
Player of the Match: Ricky Stuart (Australia)

France	Australia

FB	1	Frantz Martial
RW	2	Frederic Banquet
RC	3	David Despin
LC	4	Pierre Chamorin
LW	5	David Fraisse
SO	6	Jean-Marc Garcia
SH	7	Patrick Entat (c)
PR	8	Frédéric Teixido
HK	9	Thierry Valero
PR	10	Hadji Boudebza
SR	11	Daniel Divet
SR	12	Didier Cabestany
LF	13	Pascal Jampy
Substitutions:
IC	14	Mathieu Khedemi
IC	15	Jacques Pech
IC	16	Claude Sirvent
IC	17	Karl Jaavuo
Coach:
(France) Ivan Grésèque

FB	1	Brett Mullins
RW	2	Andrew Ettingshausen
RC	3	Mal Meninga (c)
LC	4	Steve Renouf
LW	5	Rod Wishart
FE	6	Laurie Daley
HB	7	Ricky Stuart
PR	8	Glenn Lazarus
HK	9	Steve Walters
PR	10	Ian Roberts
SR	11	Paul Sironen
SR	12	David Furner
LK	13	Brad Fittler
Substitutions:
IC	14	Tim Brasher
IC	15	Allan Langer
IC	16	Paul Harragon
IC	17	David Fairleigh
Coach:
(Australia) Bob Fulton

In what was Australian captain Mal Meninga's last game of rugby league, the Kangaroos ran in 13 tries at the Stade de la Méditerranée in Béziers to destroy the hapless French team 74–0, easily surpassing their then world record win of 58–0 over France earlier in the year at Parramatta Stadium in Sydney. Winger Andrew Ettingshausen crossed for a hat-trick while fullback Brett Mullins and centre Steve Renough both crossed for two tries. Other try scorers for the Kangaroos were Laurie Daley, David Fairleigh, Paul Harragon (who had replaced Greg Florimo on the bench), Ricky Stuart who got his first test try, Rod Wishart and Mal Meninga who fittingly scored the final try of the game (Meninga himself later admitted his try had been a clear cut double movement but referee Bill Harrigan had awarded it anyway). Rod wishart also had a good day with the boot landing 11 of his 13-goal attempts to take his point scoring tally to a Kangaroo Tour record of 174 (from 11 games), breaking the post-war record of 170 set by dual rugby international Michael O'Connor on the 1986 Kangaroo Tour (the all-time record remained at 285 points (19 tries and 114 goals) set by Dave Brown during the 1933–34 Kangaroo tour). This was Australia's 11th straight win over France dating back to the French tour of Australasia in 1981.

Andrew Ettingshausen's hat trick of tries took his tally to 15 for the tour equaling his score from the 1990 tour and ensuring he became the second player to be the leading try scorer on two (consecutive) Kangaroo tours. The other player was his 1990 and 1994 coach Bob Fulton who had led the try scoring in 1973 and 1978.

== Statistics ==
Leading Try Scorer

- 15 by Andrew Ettingshausen*

Leading Point Scorer

- 174 by Rod Wishart (8 tries, 71 goals)

Largest Attendance

- 57,034 - First test vs Great Britain at Wembley Stadium**

Largest Club Game Attendance

- 20,057 - Wigan vs Australia at Central Park

* Andrew Ettingshausen became the second player to be the leading try scorer on consecutive Kangaroo Tours having also topped the list with 15 in 1990 (team coach Bob Fulton had been the leading try scorer on the 1973 and 1978 tours).
** The First test attendance of 57,034 remains the largest ever recorded Kangaroo Tour crowd and the largest ever non World Cup test attendance in England
