= Tony Hearn (rugby league) =

Australian rugby league footballer

Personal information
- Full name: Anthony Hearn
- Born: 18 August 1969 (age 56)

Playing information
- Position: Prop
Club
Years	Team	Pld	T	G	FG	P
1992–95	North Sydney	75	4	0	0	16
1996	South Queensland	15	0	0	0	0
1997–98	St George	25	0	0	0	0
	Total	115	4	0	0	16
Representative
Years	Team	Pld	T	G	FG	P
1995–97	Queensland	7	0	0	0	0

Tony Hearn (born 18 August 1969) is an Australian former professional rugby league footballer who played in the 1990s. Hearn played for the North Sydney Bears, South Queensland Crushers, and St. George Dragons. He also represented Queensland in 7 state of Origin games between 1995 and 1997. While not born in Queensland, Hearn grew up there.

== Playing career ==
Hearn made his first-grade debut for North Sydney in Round 3 1992 against St George.

In 1994, Hearn made 16 appearances for Norths as the club finished 2nd on the table, enjoying their best season in several years. Norths reached the preliminary final but were defeated by eventual premiers Canberra, with Hearn playing in the match.

During the 1993 and 1994 seasons, Hearn was suspended 3 times for foul play by the NSWRL Judiciary.

In 1995, Norths qualified for the finals, with Hearn making 10 appearances. His final game for Norths was a 14–14 draw against the Gold Coast.

With the Super League war in 1995, the Australian Rugby League (ARL) refused to pick Super League aligned players for representative games that year. That opened up State of Origin selection for Tony Hearn who was subsequently selected to play for Queensland under rookie State of Origin coach Paul Vautin. With the Maroons left to pick a very inexperienced side, the team was labeled as "Neville's" (nobodies) by coach Vautin who used the underdog status to motivate his players. Queensland, including Hearn in the front row, surprised everyone by winning the 1995 State of Origin series 3-0 in a spectacular upset in which most had not even given the Maroons a chance of winning a game, let alone the entire series. Unfortunately however for Hearn, what was being touted as possible selection for Australia for the upcoming Test series against New Zealand, turned sour in Game 3 of the Origin series at Lang Park in Brisbane. Reacting from what he believed was a swinging arm from opposing NSW front rower Mark Carroll, Hearn got up and threw what appeared to be a headbutt at Carroll who reacted with a flurry of punches. After the fight was broken up and despite Hearn being put on report for "using the head", referee Eddie Ward somehow ended up giving Qld the penalty. The headbutt ended up costing Hearn an 8 week suspension and ended any chance of his Test selection.

In 1996, Hearn joined South Queensland and made 15 appearances for the club as they finished last on the table.

In 1997, Hearn joined St George playing with them for 2 seasons before retiring at the end of 1998.
