= Florimo =

Florimo is an Italian surname. Notable people with this name include:

- Francesco Florimo (1800–1888), Italian librarian, musicologist, historian of music, and composer
- Greg Florimo (born 1967), Australian former professional rugby league footballer
