= Terry Hill =

Australian rugby league footballer (1972–2024)

Personal information
- Full name: Terence Christopher Hill
- Born: 22 January 1972 Newtown, New South Wales, Australia
- Died: 24 April 2024 (aged 52) Philippines

Playing information
- Height: 185 cm (6 ft 1 in)
- Weight: 105 kg (16 st 7 lb)
- Position: Centre, Five-eighth, Lock
Club
Years	Team	Pld	T	G	FG	P
1990	South Sydney	9	2	0	0	8
1991	Eastern Suburbs	13	8	0	0	32
1992–93	Western Suburbs	33	7	0	0	28
1994–99	Manly Sea Eagles	126	61	0	0	244
2000–03	Wests Tigers	49	8	0	0	32
2005	Manly Sea Eagles	16	3	0	0	12
	Total	246	89	0	0	356
Representative
Years	Team	Pld	T	G	FG	P
1993–97	City Origin	5	3	0	0	12
1993–00	New South Wales	14	0	0	0	0
1994–98	Australia	9	8	0	0	32
- Relatives: George Stonestreet (grandfather)
Medals
Men's rugby league
Representing Australia
Rugby League World Cup
Gold medal – first place	1995 England/Wales	Team

Terence Christopher Hill (22 January 1972 – 24 April 2024) was an Australian professional rugby league footballer who played as a centre in the 1990s and 2000s. He played in the NRL for the South Sydney Rabbitohs, Eastern Suburbs, Western Suburbs Magpies, Manly-Warringah Sea Eagles and the Wests Tigers as well as representative football for New South Wales and Australia. He was also well known for his promotional television work with Lowes Menswear.

== Playing career ==
Hill began his career at South Sydney in 1990 making his first grade debut for the club in round 1 against Canterbury. He scored a try in South Sydney's 14–10 loss at the old Sydney Football Stadium. He would play nine games in his debut season as the club finished with the Wooden Spoon. He went to Eastern Suburbs in 1991 and Western Suburbs in 1992/1993.

Hill moved to the Manly-Warringah Sea Eagles in 1994. At the end of the 1994 NSWRL season, he went on the 1994 Kangaroo tour. In 1995, Hill played 16 games and scored nine tries as the club won the Minor Premiership. Hill would play in that season's grand final where Manly suffered a shock 17–4 defeat against Canterbury. Manly had only lost two games all year heading into the decider. The following year, Manly claimed the Minor Premiership again and reached their second consecutive grand final. Hill played at centre in the clubs 20–8 victory over St. George.

Hill was the season's top try-scorer in the ARL half of 1997's split competition. Manly would claim a third straight Minor Premiership and also reach the grand final once again. Hill would play at centre in the grand final as Manly suffered a heart breaking 22–16 loss to Newcastle. In 2000, Hill signed for the newly formed Wests Tigers club. He played in their inaugural game, a 24–24 draw with Brisbane at Campbelltown Stadium.

At the beginning of 2004, Hill had signed for South Sydney but a groin injury during pre-season training caused him to retire. By the end of the year, Hill was training once more with another former club, Manly-Warringah. He went on to make 16 appearances for Manly in the 2005 season. His final game in the top grade was a 46–22 loss against Minor Premiers Parramatta in the qualifying final.

Hill was called out of retirement in 2006 to play rugby union for the Central Coast Waves. He suffered a knee injury during the Grand Final of the NSW Country Caldwell Cup and was unable to take any part in the Waves' 2006 Shute Shield campaign.

=== Representative career ===
Hill was selected to represent New South Wales in State of Origin series as a centre in six series:

- Game III of the 1993 State of Origin series
- All games of the 1995 State of Origin series
- All games in the 1997 State of Origin series
- All games in the 1998 State of Origin series
- All games in the 1999 State of Origin series
- Game I of the 2000 State of Origin series

Hill earned selection for the Australian national team on nine occasions from 1994 to 1998, scoring eight tries. He was a 1994 Kangaroo tourist before playing in his first international against New Zealand in 1995. Hill was reported for head-butting in this match and was suspended for four weeks, missing the following two tests. Hill would go on to play nine tests for Australia until 1998, including centre for Australia in their 16–8 win over England in the 1995 Rugby League World Cup Final at London's Wembley Stadium.

=== Career highlights ===
- First Grade Debut: 1990 – Round 1 South Sydney vs Bulldogs at Sydney Football Stadium, 17 March
- Representative Debut: 1993, City vs Country Origin, 23 April at Parramatta Stadium. Started in the centres for City Origin.
- State of Origin Debut: 1993, game 3 at Lang Park, 31 May. Started from the bench.
- International Selection: 1995, Australia vs New Zealand, game I at Suncorp Stadium 23 June, scoring one try
- Premierships: 1996 Grand Final – member of the Manly-Warringah team that defeated St. George Dragons, 20–8

== Court case over draft system ==
Hill greatest influence on the game was changing the draft system. Hill became embroiled in the "External and Internal Draft" system in the 1991 season when, after agreeing to a playing and employment deal with the Western Suburbs Magpies, he was drafted from the Internal Draft pool by Eastern Suburbs. Hill and 126 other plaintiffs took the NSW Rugby League to court, arguing the draft was a restraint of trade. Hill's initial appeal was overturned and he eventually agreed to a three-year contract with Easts. By the end of 1991 the High Court had overturned the draft system and in 1992 Hill was given a release and he was able to move on to Western Suburbs Magpies.

== Television career ==
Hill regularly appeared in television advertisements for Lowes Menswear. He was a regular contributor to Channel Nine's The Footy Show in the 1990s. Hill quit the program in 1998 claiming he wanted to focus on his football career.

== Coaching career ==
Following his retirement from professional rugby league, Hill coached teams in the New South Wales Country Rugby League. Formerly with the Umina Bunnies, he was appointed head coach at the Kincumber Rugby League Football Club in the Central Coast Division for 2008.

== Controversies ==
In 1994, Hill was selected on the Kangaroo touring squad for England. Shortly before the squad departed Australia, Hill was charged with two counts of assault occasioning actual bodily harm on an ABC radio producer, Tony Twiss, and his friend Peter Krahe. The charges related to an incident outside the Woollahra Hotel on 24 September when Twiss and Krahe intervened in an argument involving Hill and his wife Tracey. There was discussion whether Hill would be dropped from the tour, but ARL executive chairman Ken Arthurson ultimately ruled that Hill was innocent until found guilty and allowed him to tour.

Hill pled not guilty in January 1995, and the trial took place in June. In September, Hill was found guilty of the charges. He was fined $1,000 and put on a two-year good behaviour bond. Later that month Hill played in the 1995 Grand Final and was selected in the Australian squad for the 1995 World Cup.

In February 1997, Hill faced Manly Court on a drink-driving offence. He was presented as a man of good character despite these two convictions. This resulted in an internal review ordered by Police Commissioner Peter Ryan. It was revealed that Hill had not been fingerprinted when arrested in September 1994, which was why the charges had not shown up on his record.

== Personal life and death ==
Hill was born in Newtown, a suburb of Sydney, New South Wales. He had three children with his first wife, Tracey Benson. Hill was later married to Bob Fulton's daughter Kristie. His third wife Marilou was from the Philippines and Hill was stepfather to her two children.

Hill died of a suspected heart attack while holidaying in the Philippines, on 24 April 2024, at the age of 52.
