= Jim Serdaris =

Australia international rugby league footballer

Personal information
- Born: 1 October 1971 (age 54) Sydney, New South Wales, Australia

Playing information
- Position: Hooker, Second-row
Club
Years	Team	Pld	T	G	FG	P
1989–92	South Sydney	69	11	0	0	44
1993	Canterbury Bulldogs	22	3	0	0	12
1994–95	Western Suburbs	37	11	0	1	45
1996–99	Manly Sea Eagles	80	8	0	0	32
2002	Pia XIII	0	0	0	0	0
	Total	208	33	0	1	133
Representative
Years	Team	Pld	T	G	FG	P
1995	New South Wales	3	1	0	0	0
1994–95	Australia	1	0	0	0	0
1995	City Origin	1	0	0	0	0

Jim Serdaris (born 1 October 1971) is an Australian former professional rugby league. He played for the South Sydney Rabbitohs, Canterbury-Bankstown Bulldogs, Western Suburbs Magpies, Manly-Warringah Sea Eagles. He also represented New South Wales and played one game for the Australian national side. He primarily played at hooker.

== Career ==
Serdaris won the Dally M Rookie of the Year in 1989. At the end of the 1994 NSWRL season, he went on the 1994 Kangaroo tour, the last Western Suburbs player to ever tour with the Kangaroos. He was selected to represent New South Wales as a hooker for all three games of the 1995 State of Origin series and played his only Test for Australia in the subsequent series against New Zealand. Serdaris was a member of the 1996 Grand Final winning Manly-Warringah team which defeated St. George Dragons, 20–8. Although his Australian first-grade career came to an end in 1999, Serdaris returned to rugby league in 2002, joining French club Pia XIII.

== Sources ==
- Whiticker, Alan; Hudson, Glen (2007). The Encyclopedia of Rugby League Players. Wetherill Park, New South Wales: Gary Allen Pty Ltd. p. 609. ISBN 978-1-877082-93-1.
