= Phil Eden =

English rugby league footballer (born 1963)

Personal information
- Full name: Philip Gregory Eden
- Born: 13 December 1963 (age 62)

Playing information
- Position: Wing, Centre
Club
Years	Team	Pld	T	G	FG	P
1983–93	Wakefield Trinity	250	65	0	0	267
1993	Halifax
1994–96	Castleford	9	3	0	0	12
	Total	259	68	0	0	279

Philip Eden (born 13 December 1963) is a former professional rugby league footballer who played in the 1980s and 1990s. He played at club level for Wakefield Trinity, Halifax and Castleford, as a wing or centre.

== Playing career ==
=== County Cup Final appearances ===
Phil Eden played centre in Wakefield Trinity's 8–11 defeat by Castleford in the 1990 Yorkshire Cup Final during the 1990–91 season at Elland Road, Leeds on Sunday 23 September 1990.

=== Club career ===
Phil Eden made his début for Wakefield Trinity during January 1983, and he played his last match for Wakefield Trinity during the 1993–94 season.

== Personal life ==
Phil Eden is the father of the rugby league footballer; Greg Eden.

== Conviction ==
Phil Eden was jailed for 16-months in November 2013 after pleading guilty to possessing images of child pornography.
