= Paul Darley =

Ireland international rugby league footballer

Personal information
- Full name: Paul Darley
- Born: 26 January 1974 (age 51); Kippax, West Yorkshire, England

Playing information
- Position: Hooker, Second-row, Loose forward
Club
Years	Team	Pld	T	G	FG	P
1994–96	Castleford Tigers	13	0	2	0	4
1996	Hull FC	7	0	0	0	0
1998–2000	York Wasps	3	0	0	0	0
2001–04	Featherstone Rovers	94	7	0	0	28
	Total	117	7	2	0	32
Representative
Years	Team	Pld	T	G	FG	P
2004	Ireland	3
- Source: As of 21 October 2010

Paul Darley (born 26 January 1974) is an English former professional rugby league footballer who played in the 1990s and 2000s. He played at representative level for Ireland, and at club level for Kippax Welfare ARLFC, Castleford, Hull FC, the York Wasps and Featherstone Rovers, as a hooker, second-row, or loose forward.

== Playing career ==
=== International honours ===
Paul Darley won caps for Ireland while at Featherstone Rovers 2004 3-caps (sub).

=== Club career ===
Paul Darley was transferred from Kippax Welfare ARLFC to Castleford on 18 September 1992, he made his début for Featherstone Rovers on 17 December 2000, and he played his last match for the Featherstone Rovers during the 2004 season.
