= David Fairleigh =

Professional RL coach and former Australia international rugby league footballer

Personal information
- Born: 1 September 1970 (age 56) Wyoming, New South Wales, Australia

Playing information
- Height: 190 cm (6 ft 3 in)
- Weight: 107 kg (16 st 12 lb)
- Position: Second-row, Prop
Club
Years	Team	Pld	T	G	FG	P
1989–99	North Sydney Bears	193	36	0	0	144
2000	Newcastle Knights	26	1	0	0	4
2001	St Helens	32	8	0	0	32
	Total	251	45	0	0	180
Representative
Years	Team	Pld	T	G	FG	P
1992–96	NSW City	5	0	0	0	0
1991–97	New South Wales	10	0	0	0	0
1994–96	Australia	15	2	0	0	8

Coaching information
Representative
Years	Team	Gms	W	D	L	W%
2009–14	Cook Islands	7	4	0	3	57

David Fairleigh (born 1 September 1970 in Wyoming, New South Wales) is an Australian former professional rugby league footballer and current assistant coach for the North Queensland Cowboys in the National Rugby League (NRL). An Australian international and New South Wales State of Origin representative forward, he played the majority of his club football in Australia for the North Sydney Bears, winning 1994's Rothmans Medal. This was followed by a season at the Newcastle Knights, and another in England at St. Helens, with whom he won the 2001 Challenge Cup Final before retiring. Since retiring in 2001 he has spent the last 19 years coaching in the NRL mainly as an Assistant Coach. Teams he has worked at include the Newcastle Knights, Parramatta Eels, New Zealand Warriors, Penrith Panthers and the Nth Queensland Cowboys.

== Playing career ==
While attending Gosford High School, Fairleigh played for the Australian Schoolboys team in 1988. He made his first grade début for the Bears in round 17 of 1989 and for ten seasons from 1990 was a permanent first grade player and North Sydney stalwart. During this period he was consistently one of the dominant forwards in the NRL. He made his State of Origin début in game III of 1991. He was not selected in 1992 but appeared again in 1993 playing in all 3 games for NSW and winning the series.

He played State of Origin from 1991 to 1997, playing in 10 games. Although not selected for Origin in 1994, Fairleigh won the Rothman's Medal in 1994 for the best and fairest player in the NRL with a record tally of 33 votes. Fairleigh made his Test début for Australian in a one-off test against France. At the end of the 1994 NSWRL season, he was one of the first forwards selected for the 1994 Kangaroo Tour. He appeared in twelve minor tour matches and two Tests, scoring five tries on tour. He had been selected for the second Test but withdrew on the morning of the match with a virus. He played in the third Test against Great Britain and in the sole test against France, scoring a try in the 74-0 drubbing. His NSW Origin career spanned from 1991 – 1997. He played in all three games of 1993, 1995, 1997 Origin series and the 3rd game of the 1991 series for a career total of ten appearances for the Blues. He was also selected in the Australian team to play against Fiji and Papua New Guinea in 1996. In 1996 he was named in the World Team and was named Dally M Second Row of the Year. He was second in the Rothmans Medal in 1996 behind teammate Jason Taylor.

Fairleigh played a total of 193 games for Norths and played in 3 of their 4 preliminary final losses during the 1990s as the club fell agonizingly short of a grand final appearance.

Following North's merger with Manly Warringah Sea Eagles at the end of 1999, Fairleigh moved to Newcastle and was in 2000 named the club's Player of the Year, Players' Player and Coach's Player of the Year. 2001 saw him finish his club career with a season for St. Helens in England where he was named in the Super League Dream Team as well being chosen as one of St Helens 100 greatest players. The same year he played in the winning St Helens team in the 100th Challenge Cup Final against Bradford Bulls at Twickenham. As Super League V champions, St. Helens played against 2000 NRL Premiers, the Brisbane Broncos in the 2001 World Club Challenge. Fairleigh played as a prop forward in Saints' victory.

== Post playing ==
In 2006 an expert panel of judges selected a North Sydney team of the century in which Fairleigh was selected in the starting thirteen in the second-row.

== Coaching career ==
NRL Coaching History

Year	Role
2002	North Sydney Bears First Division
2003 – 2004	Newcastle Knights Premier League
2005 – 2006	Newcastle Knights NRL Assistant Coach /Premier League Coach
2007 – 2008	Parramatta Eels NRL Assistant Coach
2009	Parramatta Eels NRL Assistant Coach /NYC Coach
2009 – 2014	Cook Islands Head Coach
2010 – 2011	New Zealand Warriors NRL Assistant Coach
2012 – 2015	Penrith Panthers NRL Assistant Coach
2016 – 2019	North Queensland Cowboys Assistant Coach
2020–present	Current NRL Officiating Coach

Finals Appearances

- Newcastle 2003, 2004, 2006
- Parramatta 2007, 2009 Grand Final
- Warriors 2010, 2011 Grand Final
- Penrith 2014
- Nth Queensland 2017 Grand Final

Fairleigh went on to develop a comprehensive reviewing platform for games which has been used across Newcastle, Parramatta, New Zealand and Penrith, where he was employed as an assistant coach; all four clubs have reached Grand Finals across all 3 grades whilst he was there.

Fairleigh coached the Cook Islands national rugby league team in the 2013 Rugby League World Cup. He spent 5 years developing Rugby League in the Cook Islands with a special focus on developing a competitive International programme. 'The Kukis' going into the 2013 World Cup Tournament had never won a World Cup match. The team lost to the USA and Tonga, but they won their last match against the Tournament co-hosts Wales creating history for the sport of rugby league in the Cook Islands. As part of the World Cup qualification process the Cook Islands beat Samoa in a play-off to enter the Pacific Cup in 2009. The Cook Islands then went on to beat Fiji 24–22 in the Semi Final and were then beaten by Papua New Guinea in the Final. In 2016 Fairleigh took time off from coaching NRL football to give back to grassroots football. In October 2016 he was announced and unveiled as the North Queensland Cowboys new assistant coach.

== Sources ==
- Whiticker, Alan & Hudson, Glen (2006) The Encyclopedia of Rugby League Players, Gavin Allen Publishing, Sydney
- Big League's 25 Years of Origin Collectors' Edition, News Magazines, Surry Hills, Sydney
