= Jason Smith (rugby league) =

Australia international rugby league footballer

Personal information
- Full name: Jason Paul Smith
- Born: 14 March 1972 (age 54) Brisbane, Queensland, Australia

Playing information
- Height: 183 cm (6 ft 0 in)
- Weight: 95 kg (14 st 13 lb)
- Position: Lock, Second-row, Five-eighth
Club
Years	Team	Pld	T	G	FG	P
1990–95	Canterbury Bulldogs	62	4	1	0	18
1996–00	Parramatta Eels	89	24	0	4	100
2001–04	Hull F.C.	80	17	0	1	69
2005–06	Canberra Raiders	38	9	0	1	37
2007	North Qld Cowboys	20	3	0	0	12
	Total	289	57	1	6	236
Representative
Years	Team	Pld	T	G	FG	P
1994–00	Queensland	16	1	0	1	5
1995–00	Australia	15	3	0	0	12
- Relatives: Darren Smith (brother)

Jason Smith (born 14 March 1972) is an Australian former professional rugby league footballer who played in the 1990s and 2000s. A Queensland State of Origin and Australian international representative five-eighth or lock forward, he played club football in Australia for the Canterbury-Bankstown Bulldogs (with whom he won the 1995 Premiership), Parramatta Eels, Canberra Raiders and the North Queensland Cowboys, and in England for Hull F.C. At his peak he was regarded as one of the game's greatest players.

== Background ==
Born in Brisbane, Jason Smith is the younger brother of Darren Smith and was a Brisbane Souths five-eighth/lock.

== Professional playing career ==
=== 1990s ===
Smith signed with Sydney's Canterbury-Bankstown Bulldogs as an 18-year-old in 1990. The following year Smith captained the club's President's Cup side to a grand final win over Parramatta. Mobile yet strong, he displayed his talent as a ball-player in Canterbury's back row or at five-eighth and impressed as a resolute defender. His début for Queensland in the 1994 State of Origin series ended when he was concussed after a sickening clash of heads with rival forward Ian Roberts. Smith recovered to play in Canterbury's losing grand final side and was rewarded for his season's efforts with selection in Australia's 28-man Kangaroo squad. His form on the 1994 Kangaroo tour was excellent and although he was the outstanding player in wins over Warrington and Bradford Northern in the week leading up to Third Test selection, he could not break into Australia's Test team. 1995 proved to be a turning point in Smith's career. After having originally signed with the Bulldogs to join Super League, Smith and three teammates (Dean Pay, Jarrod McCracken and Jim Dymock) turned their backs on their club and signed with the ARL. This move consequently ensured Smith a place in Queensland's State of Origin team, with whom he was named man-of-the-match in the second game of the 1995 series. He also went on to play in all three Tests against New Zealand. After gaining a release from his Super League contract via the courts, Smith played in the Bulldogs' grand final victory over the Manly-Warringah Sea Eagles before coming off the interchange bench in Australia's 16–8 win in the 1995 World Cup final.

Joining Parramatta Eels along with his defecting teammates in 1996 following year in order to remain with the ARL competition, Smith's representative career continued for Queensland and Australia (against Papua New Guinea) but his 1997 season was ruined by injury. At Parramatta, Smith's commitment never wavered despite a succession of injuries. In three successive preliminary finals (1998-00), the Eels faltered at the last hurdle to making the grand final and too often the young club's fortunes rested on his shoulders. In 1998, with rugby league re-united, Smith played in the final two Tests of the Trans-Tasman series, alongside his brother Darren, and was chosen as lock in the first international the following year, Australia's 20–14 win over New Zealand. In Game III of the 1999 State of Origin series, Smith was cleared of a controversial high tackle on opposing forward Mark Carroll that left the Blues' prop heavily concussed. (Later it was revealed that Carroll's own hand, which he raised in a reflex action to protect himself in Smith's ball and all tackle, had struck him and done most of the damage). Smith's 1999 NRL season concluded with three Test appearances in Australia's victorious 1999 Tri-nations series victory over New Zealand and Great Britain in Auckland.

=== 2000s ===
2000 saw Smith make his final appearance for Australia, in the 52-0 thrashing of the Kiwis in the ANZAC Test. That year he was also awarded the Australian Sports Medal for his contribution to Australia's international standing in rugby league. Declining to take on the Parramatta captaincy in his final year with the club, his career appeared to be winding down after injuries and suspension saw him miss much of the second half of the season. Smith left the Eels at the end of the year to play for Hull F.C. in the Super League, captaining the side from 2002 to 2004.

2005 saw Smith back in Australia playing with the Canberra Raiders. He also turned down a request to make a State of Origin comeback for Queensland. 2007 saw a move North for Smith to the North Queensland Cowboys, becoming the oldest player to compete in the 2007 NRL season at age 35 years and 186 days. On 6 June, midway through the season, he announced that would retire at the end of the season. His final game was on 15 September in the Cowboys' semi-final victory over the New Zealand Warriors. A leg injury saw him sit out the preliminary final loss to the Manly-Warringah Sea Eagles.

== Post-playing ==
Brisbane newspaper The Courier-Mail confirmed on 31 August 2007 that Smith was appointed to the position of assistant coach of the Souths Logan Magpies in the 2008 Queensland Cup. This put him in direct opposition with brother Darren, who was head coach of rival side, Eastern Suburbs Tigers. Smith played in the 2011 Legends of Origin charity match organised by former player Mark Geyer to raise money for Queensland flood victims. He also moved to Toowoomba where he bought the iconic Mill Street Tavern and played for Toowoomba Brothers in the Toowoomba Rugby League competition in 2011. In November 2016, the tavern was destroyed by a fire which authorities described as “suspicious”.

In January 2014, Smith was charged with trafficking cocaine in south-east Queensland. After pleading guilty to eight charges of possessing more than two grams of cocaine, he was sentenced to three years’ imprisonment but released immediately on parole.
