= Steve Presley =

British rugby league referee

Personal information
- Born: 4 April 1957 (age 68); Castleford, England

Playing information
- Position: Centre, Wing
Club
Years	Team	Pld	T	G	FG	P
1976–85	Batley	220	19	0	1	62

Refereeing information
Years	Competition	Apps
1993–96	Rugby Football League Championship
1996–2000	Super League
2000	Internationals
2001–03	Northern Ford Premiership

Steve Presley (born 4 April 1957) is an English former rugby league footballer and referee. As a player, he spent most of his career with Batley, making over 200 appearances for the club in the late 1970s and early 1980s. After finishing his playing career, Presley began refereeing, officiating his first professional game in 1993. He refereed in the inaugural Super League season in 1996, and went on to take charge of the 2000 Challenge Cup final.

== Playing career ==
Born in Castleford, Presley made his professional rugby league debut for Batley in March 1976. His usual position was on the wing or at centre, but Presley was used in several other positions along the back line, and his versatility helped him make a club record 118 consecutive appearances.

== Refereeing career ==
After retiring as a player, Presley moved into refereeing, and was promoted to the Rugby Football League (RFL) Grade One referee list in 1993. Before becoming a full-time official during the Super League era, Presley worked as a milkman. Presley officiated almost 100 Super League games between 1996 and 2000, and was appointed to take charge of the 2000 Challenge Cup final. In August 2000, he suffered a knee injury, and subsequently only refereed matches in the second or third division until his retirement in 2003.

Presley later worked as a refereeing coach. In 2023, he was appointed a member of the RFL's disciplinary panel.
