= Richard Smith (rugby league) =

Ireland international rugby league footballer

Personal information
- Full name: Richard Smith
- Born: 18 June 1973 (age 52)

Playing information
- Position: Fullback, Wing, Centre
Club
Years	Team	Pld	T	G	FG	P
1993–95	Halifax
1996–97	Bradford Northern
1997	Featherstone Rovers	7	2	0	0	8
1998–99	Hull Kingston Rovers	1	0	0	0	0
1997	Salford	1	1	0	0	4
2000	Keighley
2001	Wakefield Trinity	12	1	0	0	4
2002	Doncaster
2004	Halifax
	Total	21	4	0	0	16
Representative
Years	Team	Pld	T	G	FG	P
1997–99	Ireland	2	1	0	0	4

Richard Smith (born 18 June 1973) is a former professional rugby league footballer who played in the 1990s and 2000s. He played at representative level for Ireland, and at club level for Bradford Northern, Hull Kingston Rovers, Halifax, Salford, Keighley and Wakefield Trinity, as a fullback, wing, or centre.

== International honours ==
Richard Smith won caps for Ireland while at Bradford Northern, Hull Kingston Rovers and Wakefield Trinity 1995...2001 8-caps.
