= Dean Pay =

Australian RL coach and former rugby league footballer

Personal information
- Born: 3 June 1969 (age 57) Dubbo, New South Wales, Australia
- Height: 187 cm (6 ft 2 in)
- Weight: 102 kg (16 st 1 lb)

Playing information
- Position: Prop, Second-row
Club
Years	Team	Pld	T	G	FG	P
1989–95	Canterbury Bulldogs	108	6	0	0	24
1996–99	Parramatta Eels	76	6	1	0	26
	Total	184	12	1	0	50
Representative
Years	Team	Pld	T	G	FG	P
1994–98	New South Wales	12	0	0	0	0
1994–98	Australia	10	1	0	0	4
1994–96	NSW Country	2	1	0	0	4

Coaching information
Club
Years	Team	Gms	W	D	L	W%
2018–20	Canterbury Bulldogs	57	19	0	38	33
- Source: As of 22 September 2019

Dean Pay (born 3 June 1969) is an Australian former professional rugby league footballer and former head coach of the Canterbury-Bankstown Bulldogs in the National Rugby League (NRL), a professional player who played in the late 1980s and 1990s.

He played for the Canterbury-Bankstown Bulldogs and the Parramatta Eels. He was an Australia and State of Origin representative for the NSW Blues. Widely regarded as "one of the greats", he was instrumental in the Bulldogs' success during the early 1990s, Pay was a skillful ball-playing forward and an especially strong defender.

== Background ==
Pay was born in Dubbo New South Wales on 3 June 1969.

He played his junior rugby league for St Johns JRL.

== Playing career ==
Pay made his first grade debut for Canterbury-Bankstown against Eastern Suburbs in Round 21 1989 at Belmore Oval.

Pay was first selected to play for the New South Wales Blues in Game 2 of the 1994 State of Origin series at second-row forward, retaining his spot for Game 3. At the end of the 1994 NSWRL season Pay played at second-row forward for the Bulldogs in their Grand Final loss to the Canberra Raiders. He was then selected to go on the 1994 Kangaroo tour.

In a career-defining moment during the 1995 ARL season's semi-finals campaign, Pay broke the ribs of star Brisbane forward Glenn Lazarus in the opening moments of the match, greatly hindering the Broncos in their Premiership ambitions. After winning the 1995 ARL Premiership with the Super League-aligned Bulldogs, the club lost Pay, along with other key players, Jim Dymock, Jason Smith and Jarrod McCracken, to the ARL-loyal Parramatta Eels. He was appointed the club's captain for the 1997 and 1998 seasons. Pay captained Parramatta to their first finals campaign in 11 years when the club finished 3rd in the 1997 ARL season. Parramatta would go on to lose 28–20 against the Newcastle Knights in the first week of the finals despite leading 20–0 at halftime. The following week, Parramatta were eliminated from the finals after losing to North Sydney 24–14.

The following season in 1998, Parramatta finished 4th and defeated eventual premiers Brisbane 15–10 at the Queensland Sport and Athletics Centre. In the preliminary final against Pay's former club Canterbury, Parramatta led 18–2 with less than ten minutes remaining and looked destined to reach their first grand final since 1986. In the following minutes, the Eels suffered one of the worst collapses in finals history occurred when they conceded three tries and ultimately lost the match in extra time 32–20. Pay was selected to play for Australia from the interchange bench in the 1998 Anzac Test.

In Pay's final season at Parramatta, the club finished 2nd and reached the preliminary final against Melbourne. Parramatta lead 16–0 at halftime but lost the match 18–16. The loss was also Pay's final game as a player.

In 2002, Pay was inducted into the Parramatta Eels hall of fame.

== Coaching career ==
Pay launched his coaching career in 2007, at the helm of Dubbo CYMS who went on to claim the Group 11 Rugby League premiership title. Pay coached CYMS again in 2008 before being named as the Catalans Dragons' new assistant coach in 2009 under Kevin Walters. In 2010, Pay started coaching the Melbourne Storm's under-20 side in the NYC competition. A year later, Pay was named as the coach of New South Wales in the inaugural under-20s State of Origin match. During 2012 Pay signed as Parammatta Eels assistant coach for the 2013 NRL season under incoming head coach Ricky Stuart. In 2014, Pay coached the NSW Under-20s to their third consecutive victory.

In September 2017, Pay signed a two-year deal as Head Coach of the Canterbury-Bankstown Bulldogs. On 7 May 2018, following a 22–20 loss to Brisbane, Pay was fined $25,000 by the NRL after saying the officiating during the game was "ridiculous" and "disgraceful". Pay went on to say "it's like we're not supposed to win". On 6 June 2018, Pay said to the media that he felt sorry for the supporters of the club after Canterbury suffered a humiliating 32–10 loss against the Gold Coast Titans at Belmore Sports Ground. The loss also confirmed it was Canterbury's worst start to a season since 1964.

On 19 July 2018, Pay came under fire yet again when Canterbury were defeated by arch rivals Parramatta in what the media dubbed the "Spoon Bowl". Both sides came into the game sitting second last and last respectively. The match attracted only 8437 spectators which would turn out to be one of the lowest crowds of the year. Pay eventually guided Canterbury to a 12th-place finish. At one point the club had only won 4 of 18 matches but won 4 out of the final 6 matches to avoid the wooden spoon.

In March 2019, Pay signed a 12-month contract extension to remain as Canterbury coach until the end of 2020. Canterbury had started the 2019 season suffering heavy defeats against the New Zealand Warriors and arch rivals Parramatta and there was speculation that Pay might be relieved of his duties. After signing the contract extension, Canterbury produced an upset victory over an in form Wests Tigers outfit.

By the midway part of the 2019 NRL season, Canterbury-Bankstown found themselves sitting last on the table and in real danger of finishing with the wooden spoon. However, for the third straight season, Canterbury achieved four upset victories in a row over Penrith, the Wests Tigers, South Sydney and Parramatta who were all competing for a place in the finals series and were higher on the table. Pay was credited with the late season revival as the side focused heavily on defence.

On 14 July 2020, Pay quit as head coach of Canterbury-Bankstown. He left the club sitting bottom of the table with just one win after the first nine matches of the 2020 NRL season.
