= Tim Brasher =

Australia international rugby league footballer

Personal information
- Full name: Timothy Brasher
- Born: 16 March 1971 (age 55) Sydney, New South Wales, Australia

Playing information
- Height: 180 cm (5 ft 11 in)
- Weight: 86 kg (13 st 8 lb)

Rugby league
- Position: Fullback, Centre, Wing
Club
Years	Team	Pld	T	G	FG	P
1989–97	Balmain Tigers	185	82	105	0	538
1998–99	South Sydney	40	14	0	0	56
2000–02	North Qld Cowboys	19	4	0	0	16
	Total	244	100	105	0	610
Representative
Years	Team	Pld	T	G	FG	P
1992–97	NSW City Origin	6	1	2	0	8
1992–00	New South Wales	21	3	9	0	30
1992–98	Australia	16	8	0	0	32

Rugby union
- Position: Wing
Club
Years	Team	Pld	T	G	FG	P
2003	Bath	3	0	0	0	0

Timothy Brasher (born 16 March 1971) is an Australian former rugby league footballer who primarily played as a fullback in the 1990s and 2000s. He began his career with the Balmain Tigers, where he played the majority of his career. He then moved to the South Sydney Rabbitohs for two seasons, before finishing his career with a season at the North Queensland Cowboys. During his career, he also represented New South Wales on 21 occasions and Australia on 16 occasions.

== Balmain ==
While attending Grantham High School in Seven Hills in Sydney, Brasher played for the Australian Schoolboys team in 1988. In 1989 Balmain Tigers coach Warren Ryan called up Brasher, still in high school, to make his first grade debut. Balmain reached the Grand Final that year, Brasher played in the centres, but they lost to the Canberra Raiders 19–14.

During the 1992 season, Brasher played most of the season on the wing, and he was the joint top try-scorer in the premiership (along with Wests' Mark Bell) with 16 tries. In the post season, he was selected at fullback in Australia's 1992 Rugby League World Cup final victory over Great Britain in front of the world record attendance for an international rugby league match of 73,631 at Wembley Stadium.

At the end of the 1994 NSWRL season, he went on the 1994 Kangaroo tour. This was followed with selection for the 1995 World Cup, with again only ARL players selected. After losing the opening game of the tournament against England at Wembley, Australia reached the final, again playing England, after a 30-20 Semi-final win over New Zealand that went into overtime after the scores were locked up at 20-all after 80 minutes. On 28 October 1995 at Wembley Stadium, Australia won their 4th straight World Cup with a 16–8 win, with Brasher contributing the winning try in front of 66,540 fans.

1996 however was perhaps Brasher's finest year. Some considered him to be the best player in the world at this time. Brasher single-handedly carried a very weak Tigers side to within one win of a finals berth that year, and his Origin and Kangaroo performances continued to be exceptional.

After the Super League had become defunct and the reunification of the game had occurred in 1998, Brasher's hesitation over his future with the Tigers resulted in the club terminating negotiations, and he was forced to find a new club. He knocked back an offer of $500,000 p.a., only to then change his mind but find that the offer had been withdrawn not long after the dead line. Brasher was in talks with the Canberra Raiders, but after talks with the club stalled, it was announced that Brasher had signed for the South Sydney Rabbitohs.

Brasher enjoyed a very successful career with the Tigers playing in 185 games, which included 182 starts and 3 replacement appearances, and scoring 538 points, which included 82 tries and 105 goals. Brasher was named on the bench in the official Balmain Tigers Team of the Century.

== South Sydney ==
In total, he played two seasons for the Rabbitohs where he made 40 appearances and scored 14 tries, totaling 56 points. After the club was excluded from the 2000 season, Brasher was forced to find another club, and joined the North Queensland Cowboys.

== North Queensland ==
Brasher moved to the North Queensland Cowboys in 2000, and was appointed captain in his first season with the club, in which he made 16 appearances, scoring four tries, and being voted Players Player of the Year. However, after the 2000 season had ended he was injured during the off-season, which ruled him out of the entire 2001 season. The career-ending injury was widely reported at the time as a knee injury as a result of Brasher falling from a chair cleaning a fan. However, it has since been discovered that the injury was the result of an accident that occurred during a trail biking adventure with former Cowboy's halfback Nathan Fien. Much speculation still exists as to why the Cowboys chose to conceal the events of Brasher's injury. He decided to retire due to the injury.

Brasher did however make a very brief comeback (albeit to English Rugby Union) when he filled in for a depleted Bath side during the 2003 Rugby World Cup. Due to the attention that the World Cup drew in Australia, little attention was paid to this aspect of Brasher's career.

== Representative career ==
=== New South Wales ===
In 1992, he was called up for the New South Wales State of Origin squad. His impressive display in the second half of the third and deciding game of the series saw him pull off two try saving tackles on Mark Coyne and Mal Meninga, as well as kicking two goals.

In the 1993–94 season, he was again called up to the New South Wales squad. After moving to South Sydney, his impressive form in a struggling Rabbitohs squad again earned him a call-up to the State of Origin side in 1998. After signing for the North Queensland Cowboys, Brasher was again selected for the New South Wales side in 2000. In all he represented New South Wales in 21 appearances, which included 20 starts and one replacement appearance. In his 21 appearances he scored three tries and nine goals, with a total of 30 points.

=== Australia ===
After his impressive State of Origin performance, as well as being the 1992 seasons leading try scorer for Balmain (while playing on the wing), Brasher was selected as the Australian fullback in their 1992 World Cup final victory over Great Britain in front of the world record attendance for an international rugby league match of 73,631 at Wembley Stadium. Brasher beat out Newcastle Knights fullback Brad Godden for the vacant Australian fullback spot on the back of impressive big game displays in both the final State of Origin game that year, as well as with Balmain as an 18 year old in the 1989 Grand Final.

Brasher, who had been moved to fullback at Balmain following Garry Jack's departure from the club, again impressed at fullback for NSW 1993, but lost his place in the Australian side to Queensland fullback Dale Shearer (a long-time favourite of Australian coach Bob Fulton) for the three game test series against New Zealand. Shearer's place in the Australian side wasn't disputed though after impressive displays for Qld in the final two games of the Origin series.

The great form of Canberra fullback Brett Mullins meant that Brasher, who again played fullback for NSW in the 1994 Origin series, could only make a place on the bench for his test debut against France at Parramatta Stadium in 1994, won 58-0 by the Kangaroos. At the end of the 1994 season he was selected as one of the fullbacks (along with Mullins) for the end of season Kangaroo Tour. Brasher played 15 games on tour (six as a substitute), scoring six tries and kicking eleven goals. Brasher was a substitute in the final Ashes test against Great Britain at Elland Road in Leeds, as well as the test 74–0 win against France in Béziers, the final game of the tour.

In 1995, Brasher finally made the Australian fullback spot his own and he was selected there for all three tests against New Zealand in the Trans-Tasman Test series (only ARL loyal players were selected, which saw only three players, Brasher, Brad Fittler and Rod Wishart retain their places from the 1994 Kangaroo Tour).

This was followed with selection for the 1995 World Cup, with again only ARL players selected. With what many would label a 'second-string' team without the inclusion of the Super League players such as Laurie Daley, Bradley Clyde, Allan Langer and Glenn Lazarus. After losing the opening game of the tournament against England at Wembley, Australia reached the final, again playing England, after a tense 30-20 Semi-final win over New Zealand that went into overtime after the scores were locked up at 20-all after 80 minutes. On 28 October 1995 at Wembley Stadium, Australia won their 4th straight World Cup with a 16–8 win, with Brasher contributing the winning try in front of 66,540 fans.

Between 1996 and 1998, Brasher was selected a further five times, against Fiji, Papua New Guinea (both 1996), Rest of the World (1997) and two Tests against New Zealand (1998). In total he represented his country on 16 occasions, scoring nine tries, totalling 36 points.
