= Rod Wishart =

Australia international rugby league footballer

Personal information
- Born: 15 October 1968 (age 58) Gerringong, New South Wales, Australia

Playing information
- Height: 178 cm (5 ft 10 in)
- Weight: 88 kg (13 st 12 lb)
- Position: Wing
Club
Years	Team	Pld	T	G	FG	P
1989–98	Illawarra Steelers	154	68	386	0	1044
1999	St George Illawarra	23	10	4	0	48
	Total	177	78	390	0	1092
Representative
Years	Team	Pld	T	G	FG	P
1990–98	New South Wales	22	5	23	0	66
1991–96	Australia	17	13	43	0	138
- Relatives: Tyran Wishart (son)

Rod Wishart (born 15 October 1968) is an Australian former professional rugby league footballer who played the 1980s and 1990s. A New South Wales State of Origin and Australian international representative goal-kicking winger, he played club football with the Illawarra Steelers and the St. George Illawarra Dragons in the National Rugby League.

== Background ==
Wishart was born in Gerringong, New South Wales, Australia.

== Playing career ==
Wishart, who played both centre and wing in his junior years, grew up in his home town of Gerringong. There he was coached by former international centre Mick Cronin. He first came to attention in 1988 when he played for Country Firsts. Later in the year he played against Papua New Guinea for both Southern Division and NSW Country, kicking goals in both victories.

=== Illawarra Steelers ===
Wishart played his first match for the Illawarra Steelers in 1989, finished his rookie season as the club's top point-scorer with 84 from 2 tries and 37 goals from his 19 games. During the season he scored a try in the Steelers 18–20 loss to the Brisbane Broncos in the 1989 Panasonic Cup Final at Parramatta Stadium.

He made his State of Origin debut on the wing for New South Wales in 1990 and was considered a certain selection for the 1990 Kangaroo tour though he was ultimately ruled out through injury. In the second test of the 1991 Trans-Tasman Test series against New Zealand at the Sydney Football Stadium.

Wishart became the second Steelers player after Alan McIndoe to be selected to play for Australia and the first Steelers junior to do so. injury was not enough to keep him out of Australia's 40–12 win in the deciding third test at Brisbane's Lang Park, where he scored his second of an eventual 10 test career tries.

Wishart made 22 appearances for New South Wales between 1990 and 1998 in the State of Origin, scoring 66 points from 5 tries and 23 goals. He was NSW first choice goal kicker between 1992 and 1995.

During the 1992 Great Britain Lions tour of Australia and New Zealand, he helped Australia retain The Ashes, playing in the first two tests before missing the third through injury. Injury would also keep him out of Australia's victorious 1992 Rugby League World Cup final team at the end of the 1992 season, the first year in their history in which Illawarra had qualified for the NSWRL finals.

Wishart failed to regain his test place in 1993, despite good performances for the Steelers and NSW, who won their second Origin series in a row with selectors preferring the Brisbane Broncos pair of Willie Carne (who made his test debut in the same game as Wishart in 1991) and Michael Hancock. He was again the Steelers leading point and try scorer for the 1993 season, scoring 118 points from 11 tries and 37 goals.

His goal kicking improved dramatically in the 1994 NSWRL season, and his continued good form at club and state level saw him selected on the wing for NSW in their State of Origin series win over Queensland, while at the end of the season he was selected to go on the 1994 Kangaroo tour. Wishart and teammate Paul McGregor became the first two, and only, Illawarra Steelers players to be selected for a Kangaroo Tour. Rod Wishart went on to be the top point scorer on the tour, scoring a Kangaroo Tour points record of 174 points from 8 tries and 71 goals in 11 games played, beating the record of Michael O'Connor who scored 170 points in 1986. He also played in three of the four tests on tour, coming into the side for the second test against Great Britain at Old Trafford. Two weeks later Wishart was a try scorer in Australia's 23–4 win in the deciding third test at Elland Road two weeks later. He then played on the wing in Australia's 74-0 demolition of France, scoring a personal best of 26 points from a try and 11 goals from 13 attempts. During the 1994 Kangaroo tour, Wishart also played in a non-test international, scoring a try and kicking 7/9 goals as the Kangaroos demolished Wales 46–4 in Cardiff.

In 1995 and 1996, Wishart was awarded the BHP Medal as the Steelers' player of the year. During this time, Wishart remained loyal to the Australian Rugby League during the Super League War. He played in NSW's surprise 3–0 loss to Queensland in the 1995 State of Origin series, though he retained his place on the wing for Australia in all three tests of the 1995 Trans-Tasman series against New Zealand, won 3-0 by the ARL only Australian's (the ARL had ruled that Super League aligned players were not eligible for selection). He top scored for Australia during the series with one try in the third test, and 17 goals, including kicking 5/5 in both the first and second tests.

At the end of 1995, Rod Wishart scored a try in Australia's 16–8 win over England in front of 66,540 at London's Wembley Stadium in the 1995 Rugby League World Cup final.

A serious shoulder injury restricted Wishart to just 5 games in 1997. Injury also restricted him to just 15 games in 1998.

By the end of the Illawarra Steelers final season in 1998, Rod Wishart had set a number of club point scoring records.

- Most career tries – 68
- Most career goals – 386
- Most points in a season – 176 (11 tries, 66 goals) in 1995
- Most career points – 1,044

=== St. George Illawarra Dragons ===
When the Steelers formed the St George Illawarra Dragons in 1999 with St George, Wishart was a part of the new 25-man squad, however he mostly played from the Interchange bench, with former St George wingers Jamie Ainscough and Nathan Blacklock being selected ahead of him. Following the Dragons' 1999 NRL Grand Final loss, in which Wishart played from the bench, he retired from the NRL.

== Post playing ==
In 2005, Wishart was named one of the 25 greatest ever New South Wales rugby league team players.

He appeared in the 2006 film, Footy Legends.

Wishart's son Tyran Wishart played for the Illawarra Cutters and currently plays for Melbourne Storm.

His daughter Riley is engaged to Manly Sea Eagles goal-kicking outside back and another Gerringong junior, Reuben Garrick.

== Sources ==
- Alan Whiticker & Glen Hudson (2007). The Encyclopedia of Rugby League Players. Wetherill Park, New South Wales: Gary Allen Pty Ltd. pp. 596–597. ISBN 978-1-877082-93-1.
- Big League's 25 Years of Origin Collectors' Edition, News Magazines, Surry Hills, Sydney
