= Greg Florimo =

Australian rugby league footballer & administrator

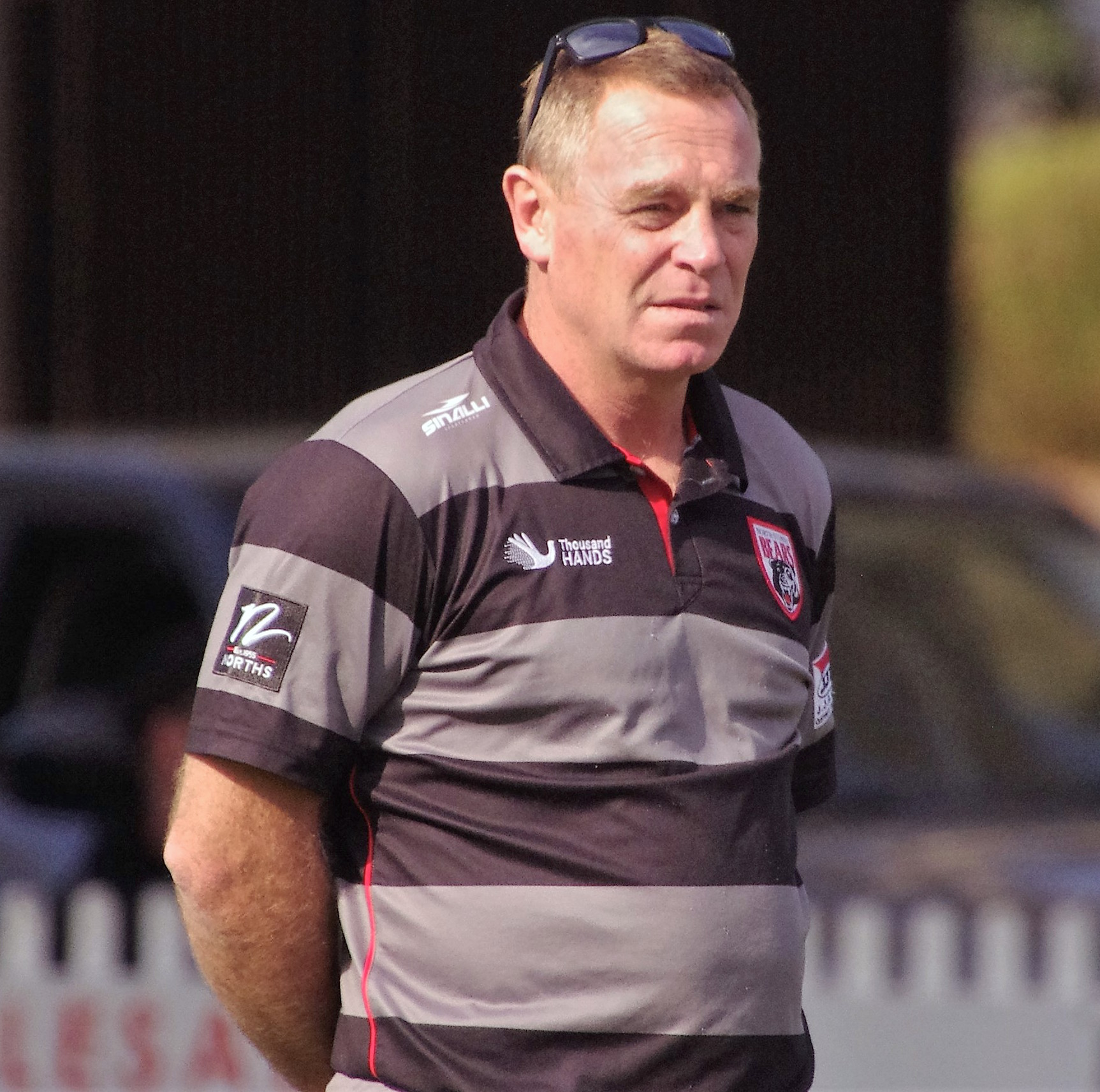

Personal information
- Born: 17 May 1967 (age 59) Sydney, New South Wales, Australia
- Height: 180 cm (5 ft 11 in)
- Weight: 97 kg (15 st 4 lb)

Playing information
- Position: Centre, Five-eighth, Lock
Club
Years	Team	Pld	T	G	FG	P
1986–98	North Sydney Bears	285	72	3	1	295
1999	Wigan Warriors	20	7	1	0	30
2000	Halifax	26	6	4	0	32
	Total	331	85	8	1	357
Representative
Years	Team	Pld	T	G	FG	P
1988–95	New South Wales	4	0	0	0	0
1988	President's XIII	1	0	0	0	0
1989–95	City Origin	3	0	0	0	0
1994–95	Australia	4	0	0	1	1
- Source: As of 4 February 2019

Greg Florimo (born 17 May 1967) is an Australian former professional rugby league footballer and current rugby league administrator known for his lifelong association with the North Sydney Bears both as a player and CEO.

== Early life ==
Florimo began playing as a junior in the North Sydney district for Willoughby at age seven before playing for McMahons Point, Crows Nest and North Sydney Brothers. He also played for the Lane Cove Rugby Club Juniors. His secondary education was at North Sydney Boys High School.

== Playing career ==
He played 285 first-grade games for the North Sydney Bears over 13 seasons, starting his career in the centres before moving to five-eighth. He made his début for the Bears in 1986 and retired in 1998. In first grade he scored 73 tries, 3 goals and 1 field goal. He famously called the North Sydney fans onto North Sydney Oval in 1997 after the game when Norths defeated traditional rivals Manly 41–8.

Florimo's final game for Norths was in the 23–2 minor semi-final defeat by the Bulldogs. In total Florimo played 285 games for Norths which is more appearances than any other player at the club.

For NSW he played four State of Origin games between 1988 and 1995. He played four Tests for Australia between 1994 and 1995. He played in the Super League for English clubs Wigan Warriors in 1999 and Halifax in 2000.

Greg Florimo kicked two field goals in his senior rugby league career. The first came in a 19–10 win for North Sydney over Cronulla-Sutherland in Round 11 of the 1991 season. The second came in the second test of the 1995 Trans-Tasman Test series against New Zealand at the Sydney Football Stadium in which Australia won 20–10 and wrapped up the series 2–0.

He was one of only two players ever to score a 10/10 performance in a match by Rugby League Week. In August 2006 Florimo was named at centre in the North Sydney Bears' Team of the Century. He is the brother-in-law of fellow former North Sydney Bears player Gary Larson.

== Refereeing ==
Florimo is also associated with the North Sydney Rugby League Referee's association, refereeing mini and mod footy on Saturday mornings.

== Post-playing ==
Florimo was at one stage the North Sydney Bears CEO, and is advocating a return for the club to the NRL. Florimo's son, Jay, was a member of the Wyong Roos squad in the NSW Cup competition (NSW Cup was formerly known as Reserve Grade).

On 25 January 2019, Florimo was announced as a Wellbeing, Education and Community Manager at the club.
