= Mark Carroll (rugby league) =

Australia international rugby league footballer

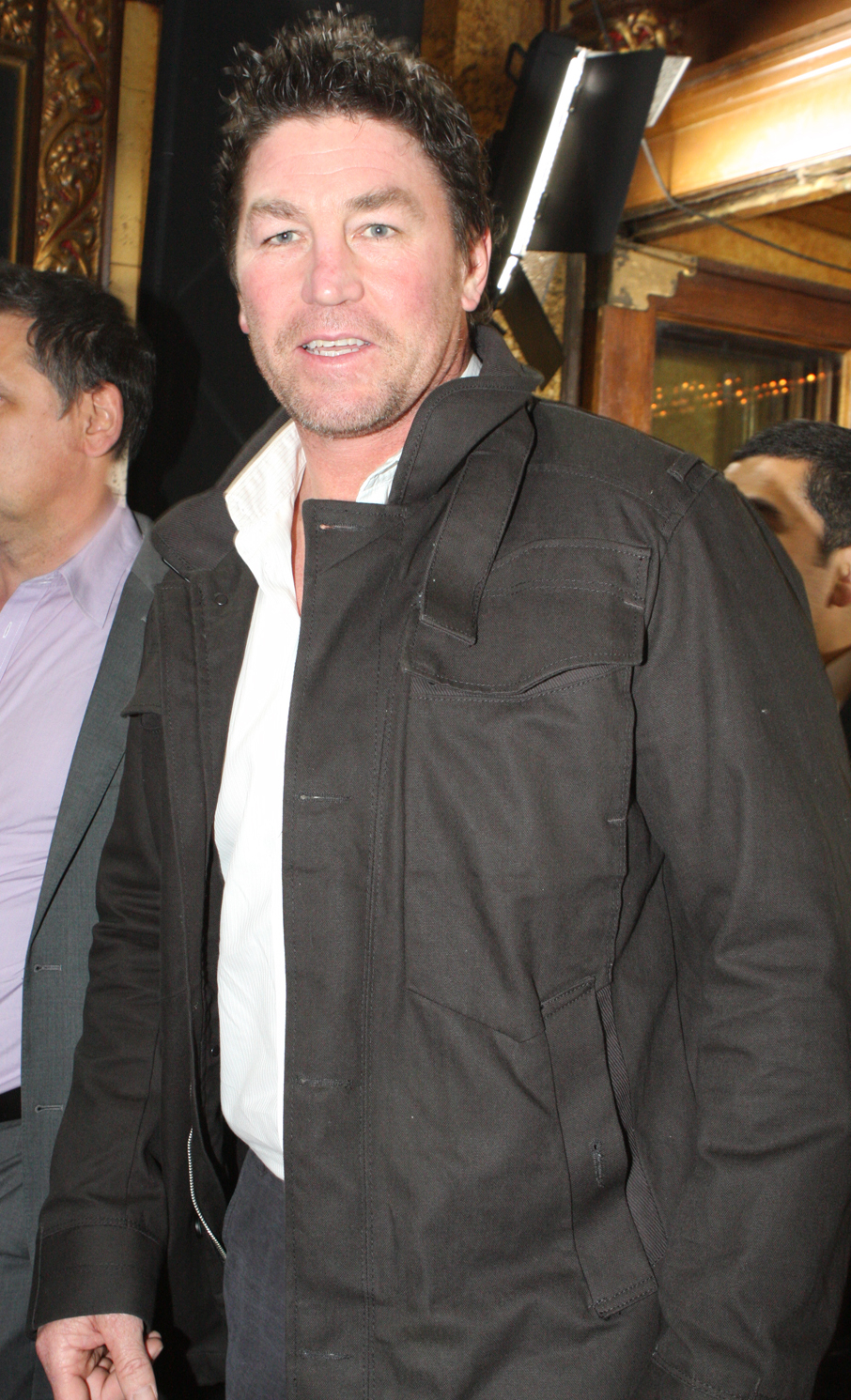
- Carroll in 2012

Personal information
- Born: 26 February 1967 (age 59) Greystanes, New South Wales, Australia

Playing information
- Height: 194 cm (6 ft 4 in)
- Weight: 114 kg (17 st 13 lb; 251 lb)
- Position: Prop, Second-row
Club
Years	Team	Pld	T	G	FG	P
1987–89	Penrith Panthers	13	0	0	0	0
1990–93	South Sydney	68	6	0	1	25
1994–97	Manly Sea Eagles	88	5	0	0	20
1998	London Broncos	18	1	0	0	4
1999	South Sydney	15	0	0	0	0
	Total	202	12	0	1	49
Representative
Years	Team	Pld	T	G	FG	P
1995–99	New South Wales	7	0	0	0	0
1990–97	Australia	12	0	0	0	0

Mark "Spudd" Carroll (born 26 February 1967) is an Australian former professional rugby league footballer who played as a prop in the 1980s and 1990s. He represented Australia internationally and New South Wales in State of Origin, and played club football in Australia for the Penrith Panthers, South Sydney Rabbitohs, Manly Sea Eagles and in England for the London Broncos.

== Early life ==
Carroll was born in Greystanes, New South Wales on 26 February 1967. He started out playing junior rugby league football for the Penrith Panthers.

== Playing career ==
Carroll was a member of the Penrith Panthers 1987 reserve grade premiers. He played in three seasons of first grade at Penrith between 1987 and 1989.

Carroll found immediate success after moving to South Sydney Rabbitohs in 1990, earning him a surprise selection as a reserve for the one-off Test against France at Parkes, New South Wales (having not yet played at State of Origin level). At the end of the 1990 NSWRL season, he went on the 1990 Kangaroo tour of Great Britain and France but made only six appearances due to a knee injury. He played with South Sydney Rabbitohs for four seasons between 1990 and 1993.

Carroll moved to Manly Sea Eagles in 1994, but despite being a shadow player for New South Wales and the Australian Test team, he failed to make a second Kangaroo Tour at the end of the year.

Carroll's representative career gained a boost with the Super League split in 1995 when he won a belated NSW jersey. Despite being suspended for a stiff-arm tackle on David Furner and missing the State of Origin match in Melbourne, he was selected for Australia to play against New Zealand. A member of Australia's victorious World Cup team in 1995, Carroll's appearances against New Zealand, Fiji, Papua New Guinea and Rest of the World teams over the next two years boosted his Test total to 12 matches. He is listed on the Australian Players Register as Kangaroo No. 600.

While Carroll obviously enjoyed playing in a stronger pack at Manly, three consecutive grand Final appearances (1995–97) garnered just the one premiership success, in 1996.

At the end of 1997, Carroll left Manly to play for the London Broncos but the move was not a success and he cited homesickness as the reason for his return. He re-joined South Sydney Rabbitohs in 1999 and was an important part of the club's early season resurgence. Recalled to rep football in the Second State of Origin match that year, he was knocked out in the series decider after a controversial tackle by Jason Smith.

== Post playing ==
Forced to retire at season's end because of chronic knee injury, Carroll became a committed supporter of South Sydney Rabbitohs' reinstatement into the NRL in 2002.

In 2000, Carroll was awarded the Australian Sports Medal for his contribution to Australia's international standing in rugby league. He has since gained some notoriety as the international bodyguard of actor Russell Crowe.

In June 2020, Carroll advised listeners on 2GB and FoxSports that Paul Gallen was a drug cheat and coward and that he got off lightly for his involvement during the Cronulla Sharks supplement scandal.

In March 2023, Carroll revealed that he was diagnosed with CTE the previous year. He is calling on the NRL to exercise its duty of care and fund brain scans for ex-players.
