= Scott Murray =

Scott Murray may refer to:

- Scott Murray (rugby union) (born 1976), Scottish international rugby union footballer
- Scott Murray (rugby league, born 1972), Australian rugby league player
- Scott Murray (rugby league, Penrith), Australian rugby league player
- Scott Murray (footballer, born 1974), Scottish footballer (Bristol City)
- Scott Murray (footballer, born 1988), Scottish footballer (Dundee, Partick Thistle)
- Scott Murray (filmmaker), Australian filmmaker and writer
- Scott W. Murray (born 1954), American attorney
- Scott Murray (writer), sports journalist and co-author of The Phantom of the Open
