= 1999 State of Origin series =

Australian rugby league series

- Won by: (series drawn; Queensland retained the title)
- Series margin: 1-1-1
- Points scored: 57
- Attendance: 165,800 (ave. 55,267 per match)
- Top points scorer(s): Mat Rogers (17)
- Top try scorer(s): Matt Geyer (2)

The 1999 State of Origin series saw the 18th year that the annual three-game series between the Queensland and New South Wales representative rugby league football teams was contested entirely under 'state of origin' selection rules. The series was drawn and the shield retained by the previous year's victors, Queensland. Each team claimed victory in a game and the deciding fixture finished at 10-all. It was the first series to end in a draw.

== Game I ==
Wednesday, May 26, 1999

Queensland	9–8	New South Wales
Mat Rogers (9 - 4g, 1fg)	(Report)	(4 - 2g) Ryan Girdler (4 - 1t) Anthony Mundine

Lang Park, Brisbane
Attendance: 38,093
Referee: Bill Harrigan
Player of the Match: Jason Hetherington

Game I was a dour affair played in hot and steamy conditions at Suncorp Stadium with Queensland scraping in 9-8. The match was memorable for winger Mat Rogers' debut. Despite straining a ligament and being forced from the field, the gutsy flanker returned to score all of Maroons' points including a field goal (the first of his career) six minutes from game's end to win the encounter.

== Game II ==
Wednesday, 9 June 1999

New South Wales	12–8	Queensland
Laurie Daley (4 - 1t); Ryan Girdler (4 - 2g); Robbie Ross (4 - 1t)	(Report)	(8 - 1t, 2g) Mat Rogers

Stadium Australia, Sydney
Attendance: 88,336
Referee: Steven Clark
Player of the Match: Laurie Daley

Game II was played at the new Olympic venue, Stadium Australia, in driving rain and in front of a record crowd. Manly captain, Geoff Toovey returned to the hooking position for NSW after not being selected for Game I. The conditions implied it would be another dour battle, but it turned out otherwise. Melbourne Storm fullback Robbie Ross grabbed his own piece of Origin history by scoring the fastest try in Origin after just 42 seconds. It temporarily took the wind out of the sails of Kevin Walters' Maroons.

All the scoring was done in the first half with a try to Rogers and conversion which put Queensland momentarily in front before Laurie Daley, making his final Origin appearance in Sydney, tore onto an Andrew Johns pass and scored under the posts. Sideline commentator, Steve Roach, commented during the telecast that the difference between the two teams was the return of Toovey, who kept the opposing "markers honest" and whose delivery from hooker to his halves' partners was sublime throughout the soggy affair. After the match, and in company with other NSW retirees Paul Harragon and Andrew Ettingshausen, Daley completed a lap of honour.

== Game III ==
Wednesday, 23 June 1999

Queensland	10–10	New South Wales
Darren Lockyer (6 - 1t, 1g); Paul Green (4 - 1t)	(Report)	(8 -2 t) Matt Geyer (2 - 1g) Ryan Girdler

Lang Park, Brisbane
Attendance: 39,371
Referee: Steven Clark
Player of the Match: Wendell Sailor

Game III was played at Suncorp in treacherous and wet conditions, featuring plenty of dropped balls. However, some of the skills on show made up for the errors. NSW captain, Brad Fittler was unavailable due to undergoing groin surgery earlier in the month. Laurie Daley once again demonstrated his prowess by miraculously scooping up a ball at his feet and off-loading to Terry Hill who then sent Matt Geyer over. Queensland's Paul Green somehow found his way through Ben Kennedy and Luke Ricketson to score and with Lockyer's conversion the Maroons led 6-4.

Adrian Lam whose club doctor at the Sydney Roosters had refused to allow him to play because of a dislocated shoulder, was cleared to play for Queensland and proved his worth by squeezing out a miracle pass to put Lockyer over. Geyer then scored for the Blues after an unlikely kick through by prop Rodney Howe to level the scores. Queensland, knowing a draw would be enough to retain the shield, had no interest in a field goal and put all their energy into holding New South Wales out.

The Blues were almost there until an inside pass from Daley to Ross went to ground. The Blues players stood around as the Queenslanders rightly celebrated, having retained the title as per the rules of State of Origin at the time.

== New South Wales squad ==
Position	Game 1	Game 2	Game 3
Fullback	Robbie Ross		
Wing	Darren Albert	Adam MacDougall	
Centre	Laurie Daley	Ryan Girdler	
Centre	Terry Hill		
Wing	Matt Geyer		
Five-Eighth	Brad Fittler (c)	Laurie Daley	Laurie Daley (c)
Halfback	Andrew Johns		
Prop	Jason Stevens	Mark Carroll	
Hooker	Craig Gower	Geoff Toovey	
Prop	Rodney Howe		
Second Row	Bryan Fletcher		
Second Row	David Barnhill	Nik Kosef	David Furner
Lock	Nik Kosef	Brad Fittler (c)	Nik Kosef
Interchange	Glenn Lazarus	Michael Vella	
Interchange	Luke Ricketson		
Interchange	Ryan Girdler	Ben Kennedy	
Interchange	Anthony Mundine		
Coach	Wayne Pearce		

== Queensland squad ==
Position	Game 1	Game 2	Game 3
Fullback	Robbie O'Davis		Darren Lockyer
Wing	Mat Rogers		Robbie O'Davis
Centre	Darren Smith	Matt Sing	Tonie Carroll
Centre	Matt Sing	Darren Smith	
Wing	Wendell Sailor		
Five-Eighth	Kevin Walters	Kevin Walters (c)	Ben Ikin
Halfback	Adrian Lam (c)	Paul Green	Adrian Lam (c)
Prop	Shane Webcke		
Hooker	Jason Hetherington		
Prop	Craig Greenhill		
Second Row	Gorden Tallis		
Second Row	Chris McKenna		
Lock	Jason Smith		
Interchange	Ben Ikin		Paul Green
Interchange	Steve Price		
Interchange	Tonie Carroll		Brad Thorn
Interchange	Martin Lang		
Coach	Mark Murray		

== See also ==
- 1999 NRL season

== Sources ==
- Big League's 25 Years of Origin Collectors' Edition, News Magazines, Surry Hills, Sydney
