= Matt Goodwin (rugby league) =

Australian rugby league player (born 1960)

Personal information
- Full name: Matt Goodwin
- Born: 19 October 1960 (age 65) Sydney, New South Wales, Australia

Playing information
- Position: Second-row
Club
Years	Team	Pld	T	G	FG	P
1983–89	Penrith	119	10	0	0	40
1990–91	Parramatta	27	0	0	0	0
1992	South Sydney	7	0	0	0	0
	Total	153	10	0	0	40
- Relatives: Lou Goodwin (son)

Matthew Goodwin (born 19 October 1960) is an Australian former rugby league footballer who played in the 1980s and 1990s.

== Playing career ==
From 1983 until 1989, Goodwin played a total of 119 games for the Penrith Panthers, in the process scoring a total of 10 tries for the club. A tough forward who was a Penrith crowd favorite, Goodwin was voted as Penrith Panthers 'player of the year' in 1987.

In 1990, Goodwin was cut by the Panthers coach Ron Willey and later that year Goodwin signed for the Parramatta Eels. Unfortunately for Goodwin, he was injured while playing for the Eels and was subsequently released from his contract with the Eels in 1991. He made 27 appearances for the club in two years. After being released by the Eels in the 1991 season, Goodwin was signed by the South Sydney Rabbitohs in 1992. But, once again, he was injured; but, this time, it was more serious: a chronic shoulder injury which effectively ended his career. He made only seven appearances for the Souths before he ended his ten-year first-grade career. In May to August 2016, his son Lou Goodwin featured on the 9Go! sport and reality program The NRL Rookie, hosted by Brad Fittler and won the competition.
