= The NRL Rookie =

Australian rugby reality TV show (2016)

- Genre: Sport; Reality
- Presented by: Erin Molan
- Starring: Brad "Freddy" Fittler; Mark Geyer; Adrian Lam; Kate Baecher
- Country of origin: Australia
- Original language: English
- No. of seasons: 1
- No. of episodes: 10

Production
- Production locations: Sydney; Melbourne; Brisbane; Auckland
- Running time: 60 mins
- Production company: McGuire Media

Original release
- Network: 9Go!
- Release: May 31 – August 2, 2016

The NRL Rookie is an Australian National Rugby League reality television series that aired on 9Go!. The Rookies were coached by rugby league greats Brad "Freddy" Fittler, Mark Geyer and Adrian Lam. The winner of the show will be drafted to one of the 16 Australian National Rugby League (NRL) club's rookie list. The series was won by Lou Goodwin, who chose to be drafted to Canberra Raiders over the Gold Coast Titans.

== Format ==
=== Captain Challenge ===
The Captain Challenges involves the rookies competing against each other in physical challenge of speed, endurance & strength each week. The rookie that comes first in the challenge will become weekly captain, they also cannot be cut from the competition during that week.

No.	City/State	Location
Ep 2	Sydney, NSW	Olympic Park's; Australia Tower
Run up the tower to the roof, Jump off the roof (75 metres) in a harness, when they reach the ground, do 100 Military grade push ups or sit ups
Ep–3	Queensland, Australia	Moreton Island
Kayak around the Tangalooma Shipwreck, then dive down underwater to retrieve a flag. With the flag in hand, complete kayaking to the shore, then get to the very top of a steep sand dune
Ep–4	Abbotsbury, NSW	Calmsley Hill City Farm
Shepherd a flock of sheep into the pen in the quickest time
Ep–5	Waiheke Island, Auckland NZ	Ecozip Adventures (Ziplining)
Climb across the zipline, on the other side they grab a bag of footballs, with the footballs on them, they go back down the zipline and must try to hit 3 targets with the footballs, every target hit knocks 30 seconds off their time
Ep–6	Sydney, NSW	Cockatoo Island
Power & Pain (individual challenge): Round 1 - Do as many squats as they can in 1 minute, the 3 rookies who do the least are out of the challenge. Round 2 - hold up ice weights for as long as possible, the 3 rookies who let go first are out of the challenge. Round 3 - move a 100kg sled over 200m in the fastest time, fastest rookie to do so becomes captain.
Ep–7	Londonderry, NSW	Fire & Rescue Brigade
Enter a building with a real simulated fire & rescue, find the fire and put it out, then find the casualty (dummy) stuck inside the building and pull them out, all to be completed in a 15 min time limit
Ep–8	Sydney, NSW	Parsley Bay
Each rookie get locked in a single steel cage in the ocean, they must hold onto the under side of the cage and wait for the tide to come in and they must try and breathe whilst the water washes over their faces, last rookie left in their cage becomes captain
Ep–9	Moore Park, NSW	Mount Steele
Each rookie had to carry a pyramid of 9 besser blocks (one at a time) from the bottom of the hill to the top and remake the pyramid, the first rookie to do so becomes captain

=== Game Day ===
All the rookies play as a football team to play a game of football each week. As they play the game, the 3 coaches will watch each rookie to assess the weakest from the strongest rookies and any improvements from previous weeks.

=== The Shed / The War Room ===
In The Shed, the rookies have a peer-to-peer session with psychologist Kate Baecher, as well as a group feedback session, this is where the rookies call out who they believe was weakest for the week & then vote for the bottom 3 rookies for The Cut.

In The War Room, the 3 coaches watch the session in The Shed on a television, this is where the give their final weekly assessment of each rookie.

=== The Cut ===
Every week, the rookies all stand on the field of Allianz Stadium as Freddy calls out the 3 weakest rookies of the week. The Captain Challenge winner has the option to swap a rookie for another or keep the 3 same rookies, one of the rookies will be chosen as the weakest of the 3 and be cut from the competition.

== The Rookies ==
Daniel Caprice had previously represented England in rugby sevens while Lou Goodwin, Jesse Shearer and Jordan Martin had fathers who played first grade (Matt Goodwin, Dale Shearer and Paul Martin respectively).

Following the filming of the show, Luke Frixou, who had previously represented Cyprus in rugby union, was signed on a trial contract by the Salford Red Devils.

Name	Age	Born	Living	Hometeam	Status
Lou Goodwin	24	Australia	NSW	Mount Pritchard Mounties RLFC	The NRL Rookie
Jordan Martin	21	Australia	ACT	Woden Valley Rams RLFC	Runner-up
Chris Hyde	27	Australia	NSW	Macquarie Scorpions RLC	Cut from squad in the finale
Reece Joyce	24	New Zealand	Waikato	Bombay Rugby	Cut from squad in week 9
Gary-John Hill	27	New Zealand	WA	West Scarborough Rugby	Cut from squad in week 8
Roydon Gillett^{2}	24	New Zealand	WA	North Beach Sea Eagles RLFC	Cut from squad in week 8
Peter Lee	23	Australia	QLD	Sunnybank Rugby	Cut from squad in week 7
Elias Power	25	Australia	QLD	Easts Tigers Rugby Union	Cut from squad in week 7
Matt Johnstone^{1}	27	Australia	NSW	Cronulla Sharks, NSW Police League	Cut from squad in week 6
Luke Frixou^{3}	21	UK	UK	Derby RFC	Cut from squad in week 6
David Andjelic	21	Serbia	NSW	St Patricks JRLFC	Cut from squad in week 5
Karo Kauna Junior	25	Papua New Guinea	PNG	Port Moresby Vipers RLFC	Cut from squad in week 5
Matthew Gorman	23	Australia	QLD	Bilambil Jets RLFC	Cut from squad in week 4
Daniel Caprice	25	UK	NSW	Picton Magpies RLFC	Cut from squad in week 3
Jesse Shearer	24	Australia	QLD	Maroochydore Swans JRLFC	Cut from squad in week 2

Notes

- ^1 Matthew Johnstone was originally in the top 28 but didn't make it through to the top 14. After Matthew Gorman was injured prior to week 2's game, Johnstone was given a second chance in order to even out the teams for the match.
- ^2 Roydon was cut before the Captain's Challenge due to breaking curfew after a night out.
- ^3 Luke was cut at the end of the first half of Game Day due to his lack of proficient rugby league playing skills

== Results Chart ==
Rookie	Elimination Chart									
Rookie	Wk 1	Wk 2	Wk 3	Wk 4	Wk 5	Wk 6	Wk 7	Wk 8	Wk 9	Grand Final
Lou	Top 14	CCW	CCW	CCW	IN	IN	IN	IN	Btm 4	Winner
Jordan	Top 14	IN	IN	IN	IN	IN	Btm 3	Btm 3	Btm 4	Runner-up
Chris	Top 14	IN	IN	IN	IN	IN	IN	Btm 3	Btm 4^{4}	CFS in the finale
Reece	Top 14	IN	IN	IN	IN	Btm 3	IN	CCW	Btm 4	CFS in week 9
Garry-John	Top 14	IN	IN	IN	IN	IN	IN	Btm 3	CFS in week 8	
Roydon	Top 14	IN	IN	IN	IN	IN	CCW	CUT	CFS in week 8	
Peter	Top 14	IN	IN	IN	IN	Btm 3	Btm 3	CFS in week 7		
Elias	Top 14	IN	Btm 3	Btm 3	CCW	CCW	Btm 3	CFS in week 7		
Matt J	Top 28	IN	IN	IN	Btm 3	Btm 3	CFS in week 6			
Luke	Top 14	IN	IN	IN	Saved	CUT	CFS in week 6			
David	Top 14	Btm 3	IN	Btm 3	Btm 3	CFS in week 5				
Karo	Top 14	IN	Saved	IN	Btm 3	CFS in week 5				
Matthew	Top 14	Btm 3	Btm 3	Btm 3	CFS in week 4					
Daniel	Top 14	IN	Btm 3	CFS in week 3						
Jesse	Top 14	Btm 3	CFS in week 2							
Cut From Squad	None	Jesse	Daniel	Matthew	David; Karo	Luke; Matt J	Elias; Peter	Roydon; Garry-John	Reece	
Safe	None	David; Matthew	Elias; Matthew	David; Elias	Matt J	Peter; Reece	Jordan	Jordan; Chris	Lou; Chris; Jordan	

Notes

- ^4 Chris won the Captain Challenge for this week but since he was in the top four all of the rookies were up to be cut from the squad.

Rookie was Captain Challenge Winner and had immunity for the week
Rookie made Captain's Call
Rookie returned to competition
Rookie was placed in bottom three or four
Rookie was put in bottom three or four by Captain
Rookie was put in bottom three or four by Captain and Cut From Squad
Rookie was Saved by Captain's Call
Rookie was Cut From Squad
Rookie was Cut before the Final Cut
Third Place
Runner-up
The NRL Rookie winner

== Guests ==
Guest	Episode	Challenge
Adam "Mad Dog" MacDougall	Ep 2	Physical Strength & Endurance - Weights & Boxing session
Adam "Mad Dog" MacDougall	Ep 6	Captain Challenge
Darren Lockyer	Ep 3	Captain Challenge
Wally Lewis	Ep 3	Captain Challenge
Billy Slater	Ep 4	Game Day
Robbie Kearns	Ep 4	Game Day
Ruben Wiki	Ep 5	Game Day
Anthony Minichiello	Ep 6	Game Day
Danny Green	Ep 7	Boxing Session
Paul Gallen	Ep 7	Game Day
Johnathan Thurston	Ep 8	Game Day

== Broadcast ==
=== Premiere Episodes ===
Episode		Timeslot	Airdate
1	"The Big Cut"	Tuesday; 7:30 pm	31 May 2016
2	"Dizzy Heights"	Tuesday; 7:30 pm	7 June 2016
3	"Sunny Queensland"	Tuesday; 7:30 pm	14 June 2016
4	"Farm Challenge"	Tuesday; 7:30 pm	21 June 2016
5	"New Zealand Challenge"	Tuesday; 7:30 pm	28 June 2016
6	"Cockatoo Island Challenge"	Tuesday; 7:30 pm	5 July 2016
7	"Fire & Rescue Challenge"	Tuesday; 7:30 pm	12 July 2016
8	"Parsley Bay Challenge"	Tuesday; 7:30 pm	19 July 2016
9	"The Final Cut"	Tuesday; 7:30 pm	26 July 2016
10	"Grand Final"	Tuesday; 7:30 pm	2 August 2016

=== Encores ===
Each episode airs five times during the week on free to air television across the Nine Network and multichannel GO!

Day of Airdate	Timeslot	Channel	Cities
Premiere Episode
Tuesday	7:30 pm	9Go!	Sydney; Melbourne; Brisbane
Encores
Wednesday	10:30 pm (After The NRL Footy Show)	Nine Network	Sydney; Brisbane
Saturday	1:00 pm	Nine Network	Brisbane
Sunday	2:30 pm (before Sunday Football Coverage)	Nine Network	Sydney
Monday	11:30 pm	9Go!	Sydney; Melbourne; Brisbane; Adelaide; Perth

=== International ===
The series broadcasts internationally on Duke (NZ), Sky Sports (UK), NBCTV (PNG) & FijiTV (Fiji).
