= NRL on FOX =

- Genre: sports
- Presented by: Warren Smith; Matthew Johns; Mark Geyer
- Country of origin: Australia
- Original language: English
- No. of seasons: 5

Production
- Production locations: Sydney, Australia
- Running time: 60 minutes

Original release
- Network: Fox Sports
- Release: 2008 – 2012

NRL on Fox is an Australian sports talk show that deals with the issues in the National Rugby League. It aired on Fox Sports Australia, Wednesday nights. In 2012, it was announced that the show would have a new panel with Matthew Johns, Mark Geyer and Warren Smith.

== Hosts ==
=== Presenters ===
- Warren Smith (2012)
- Matthew Johns (2012)
- Mark Geyer (2012)

==== Former Presenters ====
- Ryan Phelan
- Wendell Sailor
- Gary Freeman (rugby league)
- Wayne Pearce
- Laurie Daley

== See also ==
- List of Australian television series
- List of longest-running Australian television series
