= Mark Geyer =

Australian rugby league footballer

Mark Geyer OAM
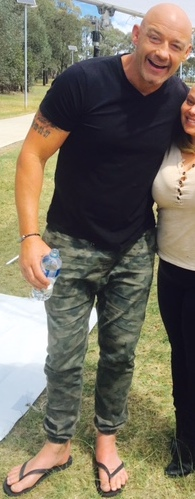

Personal information
- Full name: Mark Bradley Geyer
- Born: 7 December 1967 (age 58) Granville, New South Wales, Australia
- Height: 195 cm (6 ft 5 in)
- Weight: 110 kg (17 st 5 lb)

Playing information
- Position: Second-row, Prop
Club
Years	Team	Pld	T	G	FG	P
1986–92	Penrith Panthers	92	17	0	0	68
1993	Balmain Tigers	13	8	0	0	32
1995–97	Western Reds	32	12	0	0	48
1998–00	Penrith Panthers	43	12	0	0	48
	Total	180	49	0	0	196
Representative
Years	Team	Pld	T	G	FG	P
1988	Prime Minister's XIII	1	0	0	0	0
1989–91	New South Wales	3	0	0	0	0
1990–91	Australia	3	1	0	0	4
- Relatives: Matt Geyer (brother); Mavrik Geyer (son); Ben Alexander (brother-in-law); Greg Alexander (brother-in-law); Peter Shiels (brother-in-law)

Mark Bradley Geyer OAM (/ɡaɪər/) (born 7 December 1967) is an Australian radio host and former professional rugby league footballer who played in the 1980s, 1990s and 2000. An Australian international and New South Wales State of Origin representative second-rower, he is a rugby league media identity. Geyer's club career was played primarily with Penrith, with whom he won a premiership in 1991, as well as the Balmain Tigers and the Western Reds. He is the brother of fellow former professional rugby league footballer Matt Geyer and the father of current Wests Tigers player Mavrik Geyer.

Geyer was part of the Triple M on-air team for the Sydney breakfast show called The Grill Team from 2009 to 2017 before moving to an evening slot—The Rush Hour—on the same station.

== Playing career ==
In 1987, Geyer established a regular first-grade place with the Penrith Panthers and was selected for the City Seconds team after only a handful of top-grade appearances. He also played in Penrith's 1987 Reserve Grade Grand Final winning team that defeated the Manly-Warringah Sea Eagles 11–0 at the Sydney Cricket Ground.

Geyer was first selected in the second row for New South Wales in game 3 of the 1989 State of Origin series, at Lang Park in Brisbane.

His 1990 season was largely lost to a succession of injuries that restricted him to just 12 games, though he did play in Penrith's maiden Grand Final appearance (an 18–14 loss to the Canberra Raiders) and from there was selected, along with Panthers teammates Greg Alexander, John Cartwright and Brad Fittler, for the 1990 Kangaroo tour. Geyer played in 11 games on the Kangaroo Tour, scoring four tries and earning his first Australian test jumper when he was selected on the bench for the first test against France at the Parc de Sports in Avignon.

Geyer's form for the Panthers in 1991 again earned him selection for NSW during the State of Origin series. Geyer received a five-match suspension for an incident in the second game at a wet Sydney Football Stadium, which was preceded by a half-time confrontation with Queensland captain Wally Lewis in which referee David Manson and NSW captain Ben Elias had to stand between the two, who twice almost came to blows. He was cited for an elbow to the head of Queensland fullback Paul Hauff, which sparked an all-in brawl. His suspension saw him unavailable for selection in the first test of the 1991 Trans-Tasman Test series against New Zealand in Melbourne, though after the Australians lost the test 24-8 a number of changes were made and Geyer's form was rewarded with selection in the second test in Sydney and the third in Brisbane. The Aussies went on to win the final two tests to wrap up the series 2–1.

In August 1991, he was thought to be out for the rest of the season after injuring his ankle ligaments in a training session, only to return for the major semifinal. However, despite his problems during the season, Geyer helped the minor premiers into the Grand Final where they gained revenge on Canberra with a 19–12 win that saw the Panthers win their first premiership since entering the competition in 1967. Geyer had a hand in all three of the Panthers tries on the day and was judged to be their best player, though his sin-binning for dissent by referee Bill Harrigan during the second half was thought to have cost him the Clive Churchill Medal as man of the match.

He spent the 1993 season with the Balmain Tigers. After leaving Penrith, the coach of Balmain at the time Alan Jones handed Geyer a lifeline. Speaking to the media in 2018 Geyer spoke of his time at Balmain saying "It was shit to be honest, I didn't like it one bit, I didn't like travelling on the M4, which at the time only had two lanes all the way to Leichhardt Oval in peak hour then driving home in peak hour, take all that aside from it, the people involved with the Tigers at the time I loved. Alan Jones was the only coach in Sydney who would throw me a lifeline after I left Penrith in controversial circumstances".

In 1994, Geyer spent a season playing with the Umina Beach Bunnies who play in the Central Coast Division Rugby League competition after leaving Balmain.

Geyer played for the Western Reds from 1995 until 1997, before returning to the Panthers in 1998.

In 2000, Mark Geyer was awarded the Australian Sports Medal for his contribution to Australia's international standing in rugby league. He retired at the end of the 2000 season.

== Post-playing career ==
Since his retirement, Geyer has written extensively about rugby league for various newspapers and sporting magazines.

In May 2010, he spoke out about his mid career drug and alcohol battle that lasted from 1992 to 1995 and how it almost ended his career. He said a large part of the drug usage was to simply trying to numb the pain of losing his best mate, former Penrith player Ben Alexander, who was killed in a car accident in 1992.

Geyer was a regular panellist on rugby league talk show The Sunday Roast where he referred himself as 'the man of the people'. He was on Triple M Sydney, as a breakfast presenter on The Grill Team Monday-to-Friday 6-9am with Matthew Johns and Gus Worland from August 2009 to 2017. He also appears on Triple M on Saturday mornings, presenting the 'Dead Set Legends' segment alongside Ray Warren.

In 2012, it was announced that Geyer joined Fox Sports Australia as part of their Rugby League coverage. He is a regular pundit on NRL on FOX.

Geyer is actively involved in a number of charities, such as the Fight For Life charity boxing event, he is the ambassador for the Save Our Sons charity.

In response to the 2010–2011 Queensland floods, Geyer organised the 2011 Legends of Origin charity match which raised $455,345 for the recovery effort.

On Australia Day 2013, Mark was announced in the Honours List. He received an Order of Australia medal for "service to the sport of Rugby League football, and to the community through a range of charitable organisations."

In November 2017, Geyer announced that he would be leaving The Grill Team. He heads The Rush Hour on the same network.

In August 2019, Geyer claimed on Triple M's the Rush Hour that within 10 years at least one Sydney team in the NRL would no longer exist. Geyer went on to say "They will be extinct, they will die a slow death. We have too many teams in Sydney, it’s as simple as that". Geyer then suggested that the NRL introduce a controversial KPI target system where Sydney clubs were measured on sponsorship dollars, average crowd figures, on-field success and their dedication to junior and grassroots rugby league. Geyer went on to explain about the KPI system saying "I don’t know how they would do it, there’s brainier guys than me at the moment, people who get paid to do this, but after five years, the club with the lowest points, guess what, they move to the Central Coast".

Geyer co-hosted Sydney Triple M's weekday breakfast show MG, Jess and Pagey until 25 November 2022, and co-hosted the station's replacement breakfast show Mick and MG in the Morning with Mick Molloy in 2023/24. He departed Triple M in November 2024.

== Personal life ==
Geyer's younger brother Matt Geyer also played rugby league, initially with Mark at the Western Reds in 1997, before playing with the Melbourne Storm between 1998 and 2008.

Geyer is married to Meagan the sister of former fellow Penrith players Greg Alexander and the late Ben Alexander. Son Mavrik is also a rugby league player for Wests Tigers.

== Sources ==
- Whiticker, Alan and Hudson, Glen; The Encyclopaedia of Rugby League Players (3rd edition); published 1998 by Gary Allen Pty. Ltd.; 9 Cooper Street, Smithfield, New South Wales, 2164.
