= Greg Alexander =

Australia international rugby league footballer

Personal information
- Full name: Gregory Peter Stephen Alexander
- Born: 4 March 1965 (age 61) Penrith, New South Wales, Australia

Playing information
- Height: 180 cm (5 ft 11 in)
- Weight: 84 kg (13 st 3 lb)
- Position: Halfback, Fullback
Club
Years	Team	Pld	T	G	FG	P
1984–94	Penrith Panthers	197	93	335	11	1053
1995–96	Auckland Warriors	37	11	8	0	60
1997–99	Penrith Panthers	31	8	8	3	51
	Total	265	112	351	14	1164
Representative
Years	Team	Pld	T	G	FG	P
1988–91	City NSW	4	2	0	0	8
1988	Prime Minister's XIII	1	1	0	0	4
1989–91	New South Wales	6	0	2	0	4
1989–90	Australia	6	4	10	0	36
1997	New South Wales (SL)	1	1	0	0	4
- Relatives: Ben Alexander (brother); Mark Geyer (brother-in-law); Peter Shiels (brother-in-law); Cameron King (brother-in-law); Mavrik Geyer (nephew)

Gregory Peter Stephen Alexander (born 4 March 1965), also known by the nickname "Brandy", (Note: After the cocktail Brandy Alexander.) is an Australian former professional rugby league footballer who played in the 1980s and 1990s, who has since become a radio, television commentator and rugby league journalist.

During his playing career, Alexander played primarily as a goal-kicking halfback for the Penrith Panthers and the Auckland Warriors. He also played as a fullback, particularly in representative matches for New South Wales and Australia. Alexander was the captain of Penrith's 1991 NSWRL Grand Final winning team.

In June 1992, Alexander's younger brother Ben, his teammate at Penrith, died in a car crash that was alcohol-related. As a result, Alexander moved to Auckland in 1995 for two seasons before returning to Penrith.

As of 2024, Alexander is a commentator and analyst on Fox League, and a co-host (with Andrew Voss) of the radio show "Breakfast with Vossy & Brandy" on Sports Entertainment Network.

== Junior career ==
Alexander began his career at a schoolboy level where he quickly established himself as a star player for his side. He attended St Dominic's College, Penrith until year 11 (1981) then went on to complete year 11 (again) and year 12 at Patrician Brothers' College, Fairfield he played for the Australian Schoolboys rugby league team in 1983. He was later signed on as a junior to his local club side the Penrith Panthers.

== Professional career ==
=== Penrith Panthers ===
Alexander made his first-grade debut for the Panthers in the 1984 season as a half-back. His talent quickly became clear and by the end of the season he took out the Rookie of the Year award. The following year Greg continued his good form throughout the season tallying up 194 points (a club record at the time) and earning himself the 1985 Dally M. player of the year award. Greg continued playing with the Panthers for the next several years and become known for his unique ability to score and set up tries, his excellent attacking kicking and his solid defence.

At the end of the 1986 NSWRL season, he went on the 1986 Kangaroo tour, gaining selection after Parramatta winger Eric Grothe was controversially ruled out with a knee injury. Alexander would go on to play in 10 matches on tour with the Kangaroos, scoring 10 tries and kicking 5 goals. Alexander and test hooker Royce Simmons became the first Panthers selected for a Kangaroo Tour. 1989 saw him rise to selection for New South Wales in the 1989 State of Origin series, being one of the few Blues players regarded as playing well in a series won 3-0 by Queensland, before being selected as the first choice halfback for Australia's mid-season tour of New Zealand. After making his test debut in the 26-6 first test win against New Zealand at the Queen Elizabeth II Park in Christchurch, and playing in the 8-0 second test win at Rotorua, Alexander lost his place in the side with coach Bob Fulton preferring his 1987 premiership winning halfback from Manly-Warringah, Des Hasler, in the position for the third and final test.

During the 1989 NSWRL season, his pace and skill had made Penrith the second most dangerous attacking team in the competition behind the eventual premiers, the Canberra Raiders and Alexander was the Panthers leading try and point scorer and for much of the year led the league in try-scoring – scoring ten tries in eight games at one point, eventually finishing with 15 tries from 18 games for the season. Alexander would eventually finish second on the try-scoring list finishing behind Canberra fullback Gary Belcher who scored 17 tries. Alexander finished ahead of other noted try scorers including Andrew Ettingshausen (Cronulla), Ricky Walford (St George) and Phil Blake (South Sydney). Penrith's form saw them reach the finals for the first time since his rookie year in 1984, reaching the knockout Minor Semi-Final before ending their season with a 27–18 loss to Canberra.

With Alexander in great form at both halfback and fullback for the Panthers, the club made it to their first ever Grand Final in 1990 against the defending premiers Canberra. The Panthers went down 18–14 to the Raiders and despite a solid performance, Alexander's goalkicking let him down on the day, only kicking one of his four attempts compared to Canberra captain Mal Meninga who landed all three of his attempts. Despite his good form, Alexander was only selected to the bench for game 3 of the 1990 State of Origin series and missed selection in Australia's mid-season tests against France and New Zealand.

At the end of the season he was selected for his second Kangaroo Tour as the back up fullback to Canberra and Queensland custodian Gary Belcher and went on to be selected for every game on tour, although unlike Terry Lamb who played in every game on the 1986 tour, Alexander, along with the Kangaroos' other replacements that day (David Gillespie, Des Hasler and Mark Sargent), did not get off the bench in the 14–10 second test win against Great Britain at Old Trafford that kept The Ashes series alive. Alexander was the leading point scorer for the Kangaroos on tour, playing 17 games (7 from the bench including 3 of the 5 Tests on tour), scoring 14 tries and kicking 50 goals for a total of 156 points. The closest a team mate got in points was team captain Mal Meninga who scored 64 points (8 tries, 16 goals) from his 11 games. He scored a record 46 points in the tour match against France B (5 tries, 13 goals) in Lyon and continued that form into the first Test against France 3 days later in Avignon when after coming on to replace an ill Ricky Stuart at halfback early in the game he went on to score 3 tries and kick 7/8 goals in the Kangaroos 60–4 win giving him a personal haul of 28 points, just two points shy of 1986 Kangaroos team mate Michael O'Connor's Kangaroos Test record 30 points in a World Cup game against Papua New Guinea in 1988.

In the 34–10 second test win a week later at the Stade Gilbert Brutus in Perpignan, a hamstring injury ruled out Laurie Daley. This saw Dale Shearer move from the wing to the centres with coach Bob Fulton selecting Brandy on the wing (he had played on the wing against Widnes, as well as earlier in the tour playing 60 minutes on the wing against Castleford). In his only Test on the flank, Brandy kicked 3 goals to go along with his memorable try where he evaded French fullback David Fraisse who had earlier shown great pace to run down Kangaroos speedsters Shearer and Andrew Ettingshausen and prevent both from scoring. Brandy's subsequent first half try resulted in a gymnastics style backflip celebration. He had performed the backflip several times at training while in England (claiming it was something he had learned in gymnastics while still in school) and had wanted to do it after scoring a try in a game, saying he almost did almost done so after scoring against 1989 World Club Champions, Widnes. But, with Australia in a battle to retain The Ashes, he felt the circumstances were never right. However, as the second test against the French was also the final game of the Kangaroo tour and there being little chance of a French win, he allowed himself the luxury of the backflip in front of the TV cameras.

Alexander captained the Panthers to their maiden premiership in 1991, the Panthers reversing the result of the 1990 Grand Final with a 19–12 win over Canberra. From halfback, Alexander took control of the game in the 2nd half with his kicking game which included a 38-metre field goal to give Penrith a 13–12 lead following a Brad Izzard try under the posts which were converted by Alexander. Later a majestic sideline conversion of Royce Simmons' 2nd try of the game sealed the win for the Panthers. The Phil Gould coached Panthers never fell below 4th on the ladder for the season (Round 2) and never lost the competition lead after regaining it following Round 14 of the 22 round season. From Round 14 the Panthers only loss of the season was a 14–12 away loss to Cronulla-Sutherland in Round 20.

During the season he was selected at fullback for NSW in Games I and III of the 1991 State of Origin series, only missing Game II at the Sydney Football Stadium through injury. Despite his good form for Penrith and NSW and the absence of Gary Belcher through injury, Alexander was overlooked for the first test of mid-season Trans-Tasman Test series against New Zealand in favour of boom Brisbane and Qld fullback Paul Hauff, while he also missed selection in the final two games when selectors chose Andrew Ettingshausen. With Origin halfbacks Ricky Stuart and Allan Langer also in good form (Langer played) and Des Hasler in the team as a utility reserve, Alexander was only considered a chance of playing fullback in the tests. Following the Panthers Grand Final win over Canberra, Alexander was selected for Australia's 5 game tour to Papua New Guinea but withdrew through injury. He recovered from injury in time to lead the Panthers to England in October for the 1991 World Club Challenge, which was lost to Wigan 21–4 at the Anfield Stadium.

1992 was a year of huge expectation for Alexander and the reigning premiers Penrith. While the Panthers form was up and down at the beginning of the season, Alexander was named as captain and fullback of the City Origin side, ahead of incumbent NSW captain Benny Elias. This led to Alexander being the favourite to take over the Blues captaincy for that year's State of Origin series against Queensland. However, a knee injury lead to Alexander being withdrawn from the match, and Country Origin captain Laurie Daley would go on to successfully captain the NSW side to a 2–1 series win, with Alexander missing all three games due to his knee injury. Selectors stuck with Stuart at half and Ettingshausen at the back.

==== Ben Alexander's death ====
On 21 June 1992, his younger brother and fellow Panthers teammate Ben Alexander was killed in a car accident. The tragic loss of the younger Alexander had an adverse effect on the close-knit Panthers club and the team's form dropped off in the second half of the year which saw them miss the finals. Greg Alexander, who had been sidelined with a knee injury since April of that year, missed the majority of fixtures that year, playing only 9 games for the season (including two from the bench) and following his brother's death would not return to the side until their Round 20 match against Manly-Warringah at Brookvale Oval in August. After his return, he continually fell below his usual playing weight of 84 kg and ended the season ten kilograms lighter than usual.

=== Auckland Warriors ===
At the end of the 1994 season after playing in just 13 games for the Panthers (mostly at fullback as the club had signed New Zealand test halfback Gary Freeman from Easts), Alexander joined the Auckland Warriors ahead of their inaugural season in the league as a way of dealing with his grief over Ben's death. He spent most of the first half of his first season for the Warriors at halfback and began to recapture some of his previous form. In the latter half of the season he moved between fullback, halfback and five-eighth due to the depth the Warriors had in the halves – with Gene Ngamu, Stacey Jones, Phil Blake and Frano Botica all spending some time at halfback or five-eighth. In his second season with the club, he was awarded the captaincy after Dean Bell retired, and again began the season at halfback. However, after he was injured in Round 10, New Zealand halfback Stacey Jones regained the halfback role, and upon returning to the side Alexander was moved to the fullback position – where he would remain for most of the remaining season.

=== Return to the Panthers ===
Alexander eventually returned to Penrith in 1997 after his stint in New Zealand and stayed on until his retirement in 1999. His early-season form for the Panthers in the new Super League competition saw him selected at halfback for his first game for NSW since 1991 in the Super League Tri-series. After starring in NSW's 38–10 win over Queensland in the first game of the series.

In total, Alexander played 228 games for the Panthers, scored 100 tries, kicked 343 goals and 14 field goals, tallying 1,100 career points for the club. To date, he is one of only seven players ever score over 100 tries and over 1,000 points for a single club in top grade Australian rugby league. The others being Terry Lamb (Canterbury-Bankstown), Ryan Girdler (Penrith Panthers), Hazem El Masri (Canterbury-Bankstown Bulldogs), Darren Lockyer (Brisbane Broncos), Luke Burt (Parramatta Eels) and Jarrod Croker (Canberra Raiders).

== Life after football ==
After his retirement from football in 1999, Alexander embarked on a media career in both radio and television. He currently works as a host for Foxtel's Fox Sports station. He also hosts the nightly Sports Today program with John Gibbs on Sydney radio station 2UE.

On 24 October 2000, he was awarded the Australian Sports Medal for his rugby league achievements.

On 25 June 2016, he was inducted into the Penrith Panthers hall of fame alongside Grahame Moran, Royce Simmons, and Craig Gower. On 28 August 2023, Alexander was informed by the NSWRL board that his contract would not be renewed as advisor to the New South Wales coaching staff. Alexander had been in the role since 2018.

== Personal life ==
Alexander is the brother-in-law of fellow former Penrith, NSW and Australian teammate Mark Geyer, and of former Penrith, Western Reds and Newcastle second rower, Peter Shiels, both of whom married his sisters. He is also the brother-in-law of former St. George Illawarra Dragons hooker Cameron King, who is the younger brother of his wife Tanya. He is uncle to Penrith Panthers second rower Mavrik Geyer.

Alexander has appeared in several road safety awareness campaigns with his former Penrith teammate Brad Fittler.

As of 2024, Alexander's son Braith plays for the Sydney Roosters in the New South Wales Cup.
