= Mavrik Geyer =

Australian rugby league footballer

Mav Geyer
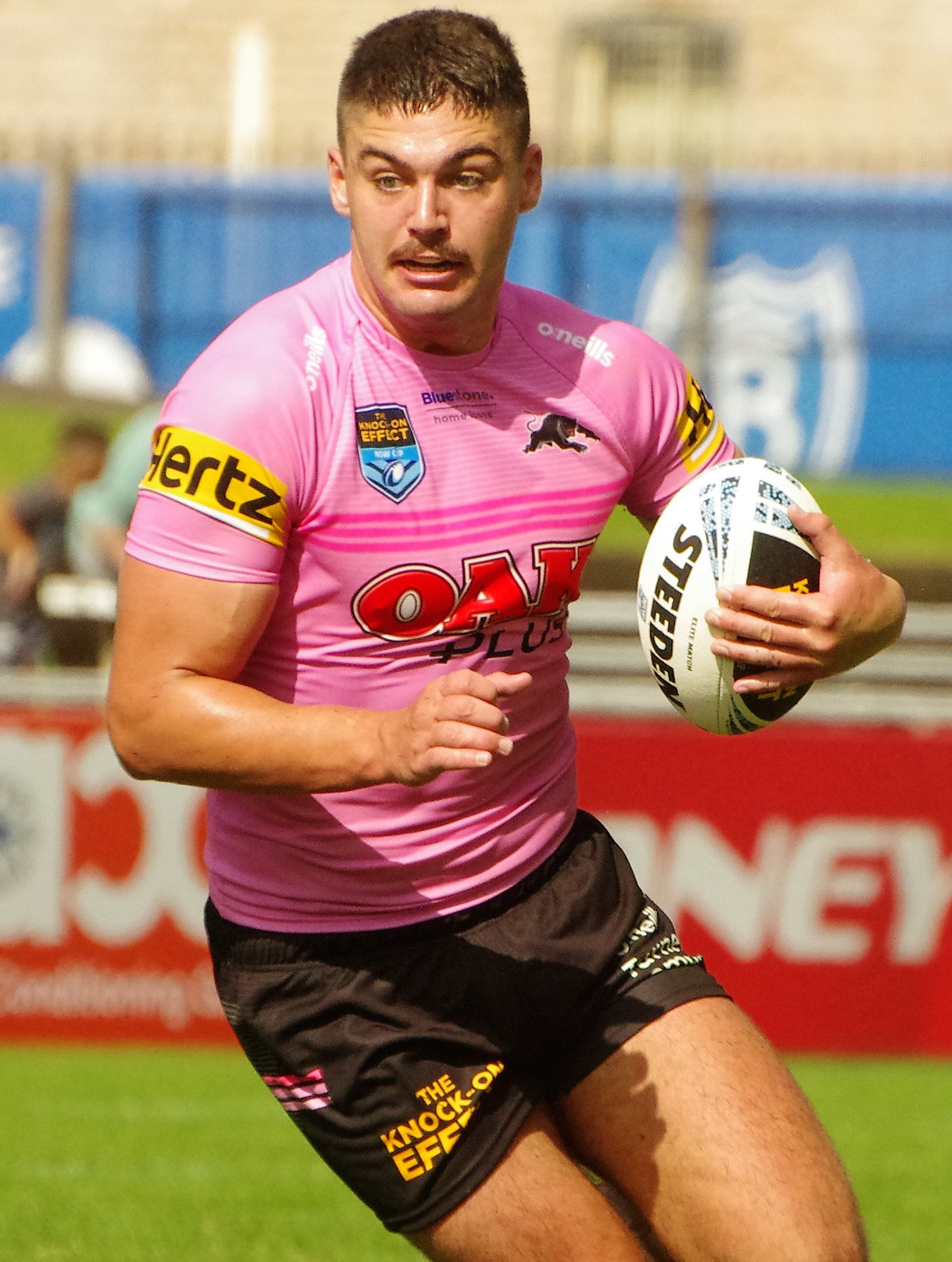

Personal information
- Full name: Mavrik Geyer
- Born: 5 January 2001 (age 25) Penrith, New South Wales, Australia
- Height: 191 cm (6 ft 3 in)
- Weight: 106 kg (16 st 10 lb)

Playing information
- Position: Second-row
Club
Years	Team	Pld	T	G	FG	P
2024–25	Penrith Panthers	14	0	0	0	0
2026	Wests Tigers	3	0	0	0	0
2027–	Perth Bears	0	0	0	0	0
	Total	17	0	0	0	0
- Source: As of 28 June 2026
- Education: St Dominic's College, Penrith
- Father: Mark Geyer
- Relatives: Matt Geyer (uncle); Greg Alexander (uncle); Ben Alexander (uncle); Peter Shiels (uncle)

Mavrik Geyer (/ɡaɪər/) (born 5 January 2001) is an Australian professional rugby league footballer who plays as a second-row forward for the Perth Bears in the NRL.

He previously played for the Wests Tigers in the National Rugby League.

== Background ==
Geyer is the son of former professional rugby league footballer Mark Geyer and Meagan (née Alexander). His uncles Matt Geyer, Greg Alexander, and the late Ben Alexander were also professional rugby league footballers.

Geyer attended St Dominic's College, Penrith.

== Playing career ==
=== 2024 ===
In round 4 of the 2024 NRL season Geyer made his first grade debut for the Penrith Panthers in their 16–22 win against the Sydney Roosters. Geyer's debut was exactly 40 years to the day after his uncle Greg Alexander debuted for Penrith in 1984.

=== 2025 ===
On 6 August, the Wests Tigers announced that they had signed Geyer for the 2026 season.

=== 2026 ===
On 22 June, it was announced that Geyer would depart the Wests Tigers at the end of the season and join the Perth Bears.
