= Lou Goodwin =

Australian rugby league footballer

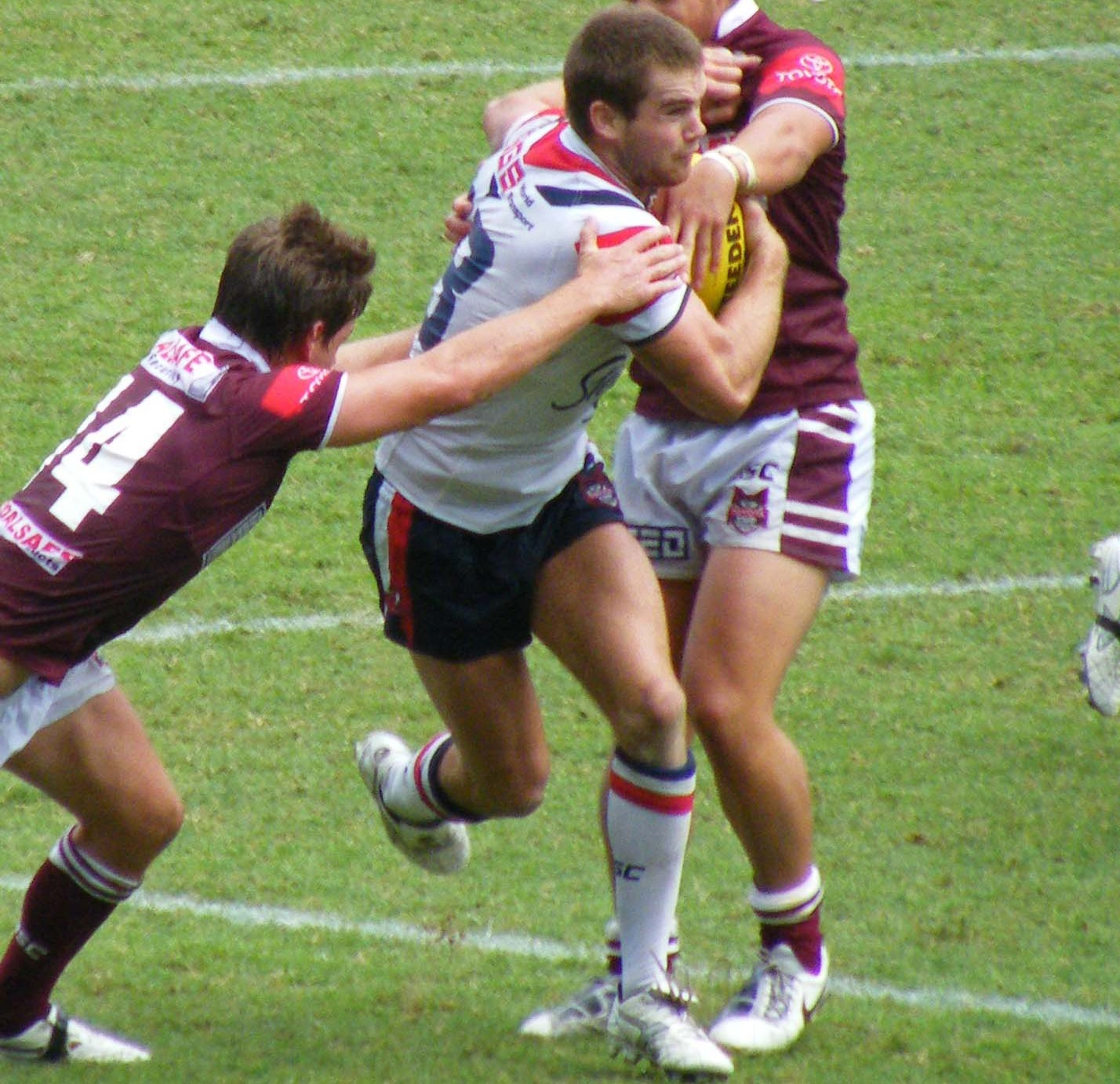

Personal information
- Born: 15 July 1991 (age 35) Wyalong, New South Wales, Australia

Playing information
- Position: Second-row
Club
Years	Team	Pld	T	G	FG	P
2017	Canberra Raiders	0	0	0	0	0
- As of 28 December 2017
- Father: Matt Goodwin

Lou Goodwin (born 15 July 1991) is an Australian professional rugby league footballer who was signed to the Canberra Raiders in the National Rugby League. He plays as a second-rower and can also play as a lock.

== Background ==
Goodwin was born in West Wyalong, New South Wales, Australia.

== Playing career ==
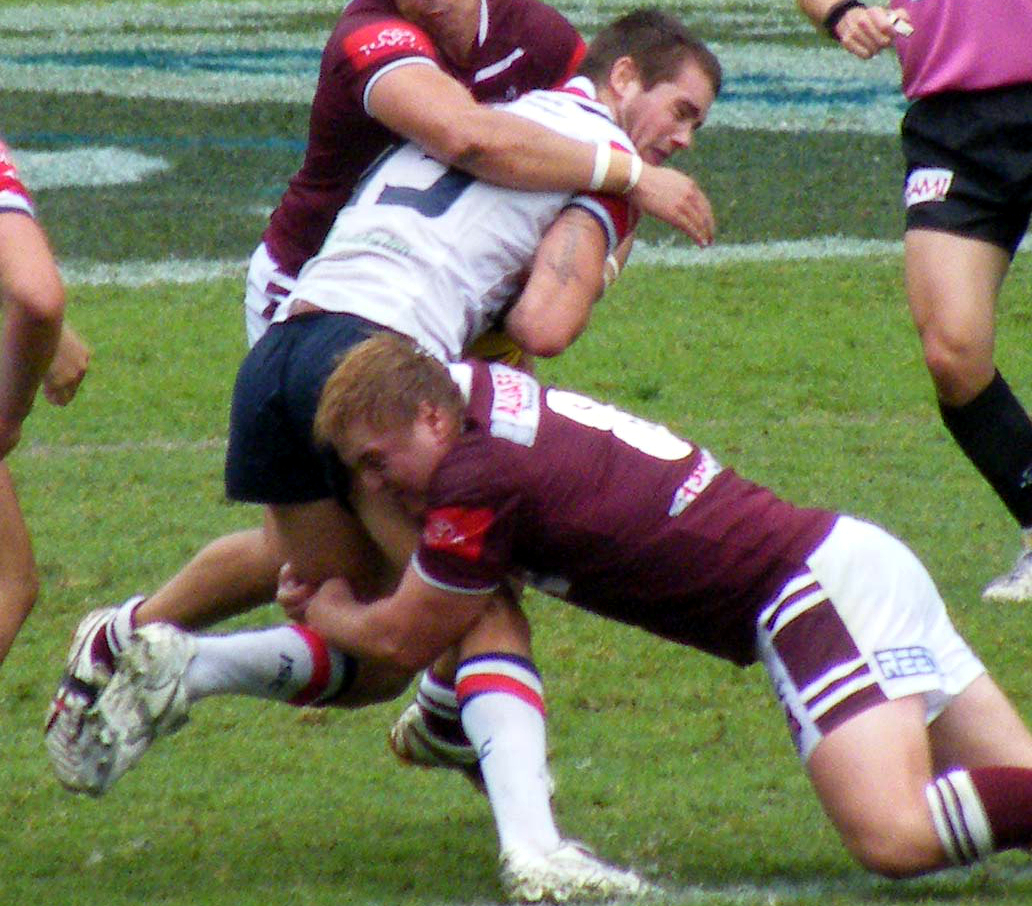
Goodwin in action for the Sydney Roosters U20s v Manly Sea Eagles

Between 2010 and 2011 Goodwin was captain of the Sydney Roosters under 20’s team.

=== The NRL Rookie ===
Goodwin won the Nine Network's reality TV show, The NRL Rookie, on 2 August 2016. As a result, he was offered contracts from the Canberra Raiders and the Gold Coast Titans, and ended up signing a deal to play for the Canberra Raiders.

== Personal life ==
Goodwin is the son of former first grade player, Matt Goodwin. Lou grew up in the small town of West Wyalong in central west NSW, playing rugby league from a young age. He played for the West Wyalong Malleemen and won a junior premiership. Goodwin went to boarding school in the small town of Forbes representing Red Bend Catholic College.

After a stint in the under 20s competition at the Sydney Roosters, Goodwin made his way to the town of Albury where he played for the Albury Thunder in the Group 9 Rugby League competition, where he had a hand in three premierships. In one of the grand finals, he also received best on ground.
