= 1991 State of Origin series =

Australian rugby league series

- Won by: Queensland (7th title)
- Series margin: 2–1
- Points scored: 62
- Attendance: 107,146 (ave. 35,715 per match)
- Top points scorer(s): Mal Meninga (12)
- Top try scorer(s): Chris Johns & Dale Shearer (2)

The 1991 State of Origin series saw the tenth time the annual three-match State of Origin series between the New South Wales and Queensland representative rugby league teams was played entirely under 'state of origin' selection rules. It was notable as Wally Lewis' farewell from Origin football and featured his half-time stoush with Mark Geyer in Game II which match culminated in Michael O'Connor's sensational match-winning sideline conversion in teeming rain.

For the first time since State of Origin became a three-game series in 1982, Queensland named the same starting XIII for each game of the series. The Maroons only made two changes during the series, with Origin veterans Dale Shearer coming onto the bench for Game 2 in Sydney to replace Steve Renouf, and Bob Lindner, the player of the 1990 Kangaroo tour, named on the bench for Game 3 in Brisbane (replacing Gavin Allen) after recovering from a broken leg. This saw Queensland only use 19 players for the series. In contrast, NSW only had seven players there for the entire series (five of whom started each game) and used a total of 24 players.

== Game I ==
Controversy preceded the start of the series when Maroon's coach and Queensland Origin figurehead Arthur Beetson was deposed in favour of Manly-Warringah's Kiwi coach Graham Lowe, a former New Zealand Test coach and former Wigan coach who first came to prominence in Australia as coach of Brisbane team Northern Suburbs from 1979 to 1982, winning the Premiership with the Devils in 1980. Lowe thus became the first and (as of 2024) only non-home grown Queenslander to have coached the Maroons in Origin. Two time Canberra Raiders premiership winning coach Tim Sheens got the job as New South Wales coach, replacing Supercoach Jack Gibson who had retired from coaching. 1990 Kangaroo tour vice-captain Ben Elias was retained as captain of the Blues, while Wally Lewis retained the captaincy of Queensland despite Mal Meninga being the incumbent Australian test captain.

Queensland lost their Australian Test fullback Gary Belcher to a knee injury only two days before the game and he was replaced by giant 20-year-old Brisbane Broncos fullback Paul Hauff who at 197 cm (6 ft 6 in) is (as of 2024) the tallest recorded fullback in Premiership history. The Maroons also lost test hooker Kerrod Walters who had been suspended for 2 games. He was replaced by his older brother, Canberra Raiders premiership hooker Steve Walters. NSW coach Tim Sheens gave the Blues goal kicking duties to veteran Michael O'Connor over regular Penrith club kicker Greg Alexander despite O'Connor not having been Manly's first choice kicker since early in 1990 and having only kicked 2 goals to that point of the 1991 season.

20:00 Wednesday, 8 May 1991

Queensland	6–4	New South Wales
(6 – 1 t, 1 g) Mal Meninga	(Report)	Laurie Daley (4 – 1 t)

Lang Park
Attendance: 32,400
Referee: Bill Harrigan
Player of the Match: Wally Lewis

It took sixty-four minutes for the first try to be scored in a nailbiting series opener at Lang Park. The try featured the two veterans of the Queensland side – Wally Lewis ran wide and powered halfway through an opening and then found Mal Meninga in support who bulldozed through Greg Alexander and Andrew Ettingshausen's attempted tackle to score. Laurie Daley scored his team's only try late in the second half after grubber-kicking behind Michael Hancock into the corner and winning the race to the ball. Meninga landed only one of his four shots at goal but it proved decisive as both Michael O'Connor and Alexander missed their only attempts. O'Connor's conversion attempt of Daley's try went wide leaving Qld with a 6–4 lead. Alexander had a chance to level the scores after NSW received a penalty when Meninga's restart from the Daley try was kicked over the dead ball line on the full, but his kick from half way was wide and short and fell safely into the arms of Wally Lewis who took the tackle to end the game.

After only being a late callup into the Queensland team, replacement fullback Paul Hauff put in a near man of the match performance in his Origin and representative debut, with most judges believing he would have won the award had he not been forced off midway through the second half with a dislocated shoulder. Early in the first half, Cliff Lyons worked his magic, breaking open the Maroons defence with a deft pop pass to send a flying Greg Alexander into open space only 45 out with only Hauff in front. Belying his inexperience, Hauff herded Alexander into the corner, then when the NSW fullback propped on his run, his opposite pounced to take Alexander into touch just 3 metres from the line. Then only minutes later, Mark Geyer popped a short pass to send Andrew Ettingshausen racing towards the posts only 20 metres out. But when confronted by the giant Queensland fullback (plus a converging Willie Carne), ET put in a grubber kick but Hauff was able to turn and prevent the Blues centre from picking up the ball and scoring next to the posts while also staying in the field of play.

== Game II ==
20:00 Wednesday, 29 May 1991

New South Wales	14–12	Queensland
(4 – 1 t) Chris Johns (4 – 1 t) Mark McGaw (6 – 3 g) Michael O'Connor	(Report)	Mal Meninga (4 – 2 g); Willie Carne (4 – 1 t); Dale Shearer (4 – 1 t)

Sydney Football Stadium
Attendance: 41,520
Referee: David Manson
Player of the Match: Steve Walters

The iconic image of Wally Lewis confronting Mark Geyer with referee David Manson in the background and Ben Elias in the foreground.

Game II of 1991 is remembered for a number of dramatic incidents. Played in drenching rain, the game exploded into violence before half-time when volatile New South Wales forward Mark Geyer chopped down on Queensland hooker Steve Walters in a tackle. Prop Andrew Gee ran in to assist his teammate, sparking a brawl which involved most players from both teams. When the dust settled, referee David Manson issued a handful of cautions, but as players left the field for half-time, Queensland captain Wally Lewis continued to goad Geyer, clearly expecting the New South Wales forward to be antagonised into a violent response right in front of Manson that would have him sent off. This became a lasting image in Australian sporting folklore.

Soon after the break Geyer missed with a forearm directed towards Queensland fullback Paul Hauff, sparking another brawl when Peter Jackson and Gary Coyne ran in to target Geyer, while Wally Lewis was trying to calm his players by yelling that Geyer would be gone. However, referee David Manson, himself a Queenslander, only cautioned the Blues second-rower. Geyer was later suspended for five matches for his questionable elbow to Hauff. The Maroons looked to have the series wrapped up when an Allan Langer break and Lewis pass led to a try to Dale Shearer 12 minutes from full-time. But with six minutes remaining, a cut-out pass by Blues halfback Ricky Stuart led to a try to centre Mark McGaw out wide, levelling the scores at 12-all. As the rain continued to belt down, O'Connor, who wasn't in great form with the boot but was surprisingly given the kicking duties despite Illawarra Steelers goal kicking winger Rod Wishart in the team, lined up the conversion attempt and sensationally landed the goal to give the Blues a 14–12 victory just before full-time.

== Game III ==
20:00 Wednesday, 12 June 1991

Queensland	14–12	New South Wales
(4 – 1 t) Paul Hauff (4 – 1 t) Michael Hancock (4 – 1 t) Dale Shearer (2 – 1 g) Mal Meninga	(Report)	Chris Johns (4 – 1 t); Michael O'Connor (4 – 1 t); Des Hasler (4 – 1 t)

Lang Park
Attendance: 33,226
Referee: Bill Harrigan
Player of the Match: Martin Bella

The Game III decider back in Brisbane was fast-paced and desperately fought with never more than four points separating the sides. Queensland led 8–4 at half-time but two New South Wales tries, both unconverted by O'Connor who also missed a long-range penalty goal from near half-way, took the Blues to a 12–8 lead. Strangely coach Sheens had stuck with Game 2 hero O'Connor as goal kicker despite him not being the regular kicker for Manly and the presence in the side of regular club kickers Greg Alexander (Penrith) and Rod Wishart (Illawarra). Late in the second-half a superb dash by Maroons' hooker Steve Walters paved the way for a try to replacement back Dale Shearer, levelling the match. Repeating O'Connor's deed in Sydney, Maroon centre Mal Meninga landed the sideline conversion (the only goal kicked in the game), lifting Queensland to a 14–12 victory.

Ten minutes before the end of the game the Lang Park ground announcer advised the 33,226 strong crowd that Wally Lewis was playing his last game for Queensland. Lewis had decided to retire from Origin football after receiving news on the day of the game that his daughter Jaime-Lee was deaf, with only his family and the Qld team knowing about his decision. The Maroons supporters roared as they never had before to lift their weary gladiators to the line and Lewis to his ultimate victory and slow farewell lap around his home ground, hand-in-hand with his two young sons Mitchell and Lincoln. Queensland manager Dick "Tosser" Turner later admitted that Lewis had given an instruction and plotted the perfect timing for the announcement to be made.

== Teams ==
=== New South Wales ===
Position	Game 1	Game 2	Game 3
Fullback	Greg Alexander	Andrew Ettingshausen	Greg Alexander
Wing	Chris Johns		
Centre	Andrew Ettingshausen	Michael O'Connor	
Centre	Laurie Daley		Mark McGaw
Wing	Michael O'Connor	Rod Wishart	
Five-Eighth	Cliff Lyons		Brad Fittler
Halfback	Ricky Stuart		
Prop	Steve Roach		
Hooker	Ben Elias (c)		
Prop	Ian Roberts	David Gillespie	
Second Row	Mark Geyer		John Cartwright
Second Row	Paul Sironen	Ian Roberts	Bradley Clyde
Lock	Des Hasler	Bradley Clyde	Brad Mackay
Interchange	Glenn Lazarus	Des Hasler	
Interchange	David Gillespie	Brad Mackay	Brad Izzard
Interchange	Mark McGaw		Craig Salvatori
Interchange	Brad Fittler	John Cartwright	David Fairleigh
Coach	Tim Sheens		

=== Queensland ===
Position	Game 1	Game 2	Game 3
Fullback	Paul Hauff		
Wing	Michael Hancock		
Centre	Peter Jackson		
Centre	Mal Meninga		
Wing	Willie Carne		
Five-Eighth	Wally Lewis (c)		
Halfback	Allan Langer		
Prop	Martin Bella		
Hooker	Steve Walters		
Prop	Steve Jackson		
Second Row	Andrew Gee		
Second Row	Mike McLean		
Lock	Gary Larson		
Interchange	Kevin Walters		
Interchange	Steve Renouf	Dale Shearer	
Interchange	Gary Coyne		
Interchange	Gavin Allen		Bob Lindner
Coach	Graham Lowe		
