= Maurice Flitcroft =

British golfer (1929–2007)

- Born: Maurice Gerald Flitcroft; 23 November 1929; Manchester, England
- Died: 24 March 2007 (aged 77)
- Occupations: Crane operator; Golfer
- Spouse: Jean (m. 1963; died 2002)

Maurice Gerald Flitcroft (23 November 1929 – 24 March 2007) was a British golfer.

Flitcroft received widespread attention after, being an inexperienced amateur, shooting a score of 121 in the qualifying competition for the 1976 Open Championship, the worst score recorded at the Open Championship by a self-professed "professional golfer". Subsequently, he gained significant media coverage as "the world's worst golfer".

== Early life ==
Flitcroft was born in Manchester on 23 November 1929. As a child, during World War II, he was evacuated to Kendal in Cumbria, where he lodged with a Mrs. Langhorn and was a pupil at Kendal Grammar School. In early adulthood, Flitcroft joined the Merchant Navy. Following his marriage to Jean, he settled in Barrow-in-Furness, where he worked as a crane operator at the Vickers-Armstrongs shipyard. At other times, he worked as a shoe polish salesman, a high diver, and an ice cream seller.

== Golf career ==
According to his unpublished memoirs, Flitcroft took up golf after watching the 1974 Piccadilly World Match Play Championship. Flitcroft had golfing ambitions well above his ability and came to notoriety in 1976 when, posing as a professional golfer, he managed to obtain a place to play in the qualifying round of The Open Championship despite his previous experience amounting only to some casual play on fields near his home. He was inspired to enter the tournament by Walter Danecki, a postal worker from Milwaukee, Wisconsin, who entered the 1965 Open Championship after telling The Royal and Ancient Golf Club of St Andrews (also known as The R&A) that he was a pro and set a two-round score of 221 during qualifying.

When Flitcroft discovered, to his shock, that any amateurs entering competitions had to have an official handicap, something he lacked due to his lack of experience, he simply declared himself to be a professional. Flitcroft prepared for the tournament by studying a golf instruction manual by Peter Alliss that he had borrowed from his local library. He also studied instructional articles by Al Geiberger and honed his skills on a nearby beach. His gear comprised a red artificial leather bag and half a set of clubs purchased by mail order.

Flitcroft's deception was uncovered when he scored a 49-over-par 121, the worst score in the tournament's history. Some of the professionals playing with him were so angry that they successfully demanded a refund of their entry fees. Australian golfer Mike Cahill, who was playing directly behind Flitcroft, stated, "I just snapped at the 12th [hole] and accosted him," he later said. "I yelled at him that this wasn't a circus and told him to get off the course." The R&A gave him a lifetime ban from all their competitions, and he became known as "The Royal & Ancient Rabbit." Flitcroft recalled, "I was looking to find fame and fortune but only achieved one of the two."

Following the 1976 Open, the rules were changed to prevent Flitcroft from attempting to enter again. Undeterred, he regularly attempted to enter the Open and other golf competitions, either under his own name or under pseudonyms, such as Gene Paycheki (as in pay cheque), Gerrard Hoppy, and James Beau Jolley. Other, more ludicrous names included Arnold Palmtree and Count Manfred von Hoffmanstel, together with physical disguises such as a false moustache and dark glasses.

Flitcroft's celebrity led to a number of golf trophies (usually those celebrating poor play or egregious mishaps) being named after him. He also had the distinction of being celebrated with the "Maurice Gerald Flitcroft Member-Guest Tournament", which was first held in 1978 by the Blythefield Country Club in Grand Rapids, Michigan. Buddy Whitten, Blythefield's head pro, stated that, "It started as a lark, but most people can't break 90 so they relate more to Maurice than they would to a touring pro." Flitcroft and his wife were invited to play the tournament in 1988, with business-class tickets for the flights provided by British Airways. By the time of the 22nd tournament in May 2000, the club featured a green with two holes so that even the most errant of approaches were potentially rewarded; another green had a 12-inch (300 mm) cup.

== In popular culture ==
Flitcroft's brief and unsuccessful golf career was highlighted in Stephen Pile's 1979 bestseller The Book of Heroic Failures, bringing him greater popular recognition as "the world's worst golfer".

Flitcroft is the subject of a biography, The Phantom of the Open, a collaboration by journalist and author Scott Murray and actor and comedian Simon Farnaby, published by Yellow Jersey Press in July 2010. Farnaby later turned the biography into a film script. The Phantom of the Open, written by Farnaby, directed by Craig Roberts, and starring Mark Rylance and Sally Hawkins, opened at the BFI London Film Festival on 12 October 2021 before a wider release on 18 March 2022. The movie received positive reviews, with review aggregator Rotten Tomatoes having 86% of 134 critic reviews as positive with an average rating of 7.10/10. The website's critical consensus states, "Led by a stellar performance from Mark Rylance, The Phantom of the Open turns a stranger-than-fiction true story into crowd-pleasing entertainment." Metacritic assigned the film a score of 65 out of 100 based on the ratings of 11 critics, indicating "generally favorable reviews”. The Guardian's Simran Hans rated the film 4/5, praising Rylance's decision to play Flitcroft's character straight and complimenting the accompanying musical score.

== Personal life ==
Flitcroft was married to Jean, who died in 2002. They had two sons, one of whom (Gene) caddied for him.

== Death ==
Flitcroft died of a lung infection on 24 March 2007 at the age of 77. In its obituary of Flitcroft, The Daily Telegraph commented:

Maurice Flitcroft ... was a chain-smoking shipyard crane-operator from Barrow-in-Furness whose persistent attempts to gatecrash the British Open golf championship produced a sense of humour failure among members of the golfing establishment.

== See also ==
- List of uncompetitive athletes
