= Ben Alexander (rugby league) =

Australian rugby league footballer (1971–1992)

Ben 'Boods' Alexander
Personal information
- Full name: Benjamin John Gregory Alexander
- Born: 13 September 1971 Penrith, New South Wales, Australia
- Died: 21 June 1992 (aged 20) Colyton, New South Wales, Australia

Playing information
- Position: Halfback, Hooker
Club
Years	Team	Pld	T	G	FG	P
1990–92	Penrith Panthers	36	7	3	1	35
- Education: St Dominic's College, Penrith
- Relatives: Greg Alexander (brother); Mark Geyer (brother-in-law); Matt Geyer (brother-in-law); Peter Shiels (brother-in-law)

Benjamin John Gregory Alexander (13 September 1971 – 21 June 1992), also known by the nickname "Boods", was an Australian rugby league footballer who played as a halfback or hooker for the Penrith Panthers in the New South Wales Rugby League premiership. He was the younger brother of his Penrith teammate Greg Alexander.

== Early life ==
Alexander attended St Dominic's College, Penrith.

== Playing career ==
Alexander made his first grade debut against the Cronulla-Sutherland Sharks on 12 May 1990, coming off the interchange bench. He made his starting debut at halfback against the Canterbury-Bankstown Bulldogs the following week.

Alexander was an unused reserve for Penrith's 1991 Grand Final win over the Canberra Raiders.

Following the retirement of club veteran Royce Simmons at the end of the 1991 season, new recruit Brett Boyd was selected in the starting hooker position over Alexander to begin 1992. An injury crisis at the club (including to Boyd) allowed Alexander to remain in the starting line-up (playing at either halfback or hooker) until the week prior to his death. On 21 June 1992, Alexander played for Penrith in a reserve grade match against Eastern Suburbs, having been reportedly dropped from the first grade team for disciplinary reasons.

== Death ==
At approximately 10:10 pm on 21 June 1992, Alexander, aged 20, was killed in a car crash in Colyton, a suburb in Western Sydney. Earlier that evening, the Panthers' players had been presented with blazers commemorating their 1991 success. The crash occurred shortly after Alexander left the function with teammates Scott Murray, Luke Goodwin, and Glen Liddiard to attend a nightclub in Mount Druitt.

It was reported that Alexander, who was driving, was not wearing a seatbelt when he drove through a red light and hit another vehicle, losing control of his own vehicle and crashing into a telegraph pole. Murray was injured in the crash (suffering a broken leg by one account, and a broken jaw by another). Although early reports claimed that Alexander had not been drinking that evening, it was later confirmed by the coroner that his blood alcohol content was 0.148, which is almost three times the legal limit of 0.05. Rumours that Alexander had been stopped by police shortly before the crash were denied.

=== Funeral ===
A Requiem was held at St Nicholas of Myra Catholic Church in Penrith, with nearly 700 people in attendance inside the church and an estimated 4,000 people outside listening via loudspeaker. He was buried in Penrith Cemetery in Kingswood.

=== Impact ===
Despite Penrith's premiership success the previous year, there was reportedly significant discontent within the playing group during the 1992 season. Head coach Phil Gould's perceived disfavouring of Alexander was said to have been a factor. Alexander's death, along with other internal conflicts, is said to have destroyed the promise of continued success for the club in this period.

The remainder of Penrith's 1992 season was disrupted as several players took extended periods of leave from training and playing duties. Brad Fittler withdrew from the Australian representative squad to play Great Britain on 26 June 1992, while Mark Geyer (whose then fiancée, now wife is Alexander's sister Meagan) refused to train despite being issued an ultimatum, and left the club on 4 July amid other off-field issues. Greg Alexander, Liddiard, and Brook Kennedy were granted leave for an impromptu trip to Greece in July, which Geyer also attended. Liddiard was reportedly pushed out of the club for unspecified reasons after missing training sessions. Greg Alexander, who had been sidelined with a knee injury since April of that year, returned to the field on 2 August, playing off the interchange bench against the Manly Warringah Sea Eagles. Greg subsequently joined the Auckland Warriors for two seasons in 1995 as a way of dealing with his grief. He and Geyer both returned to Penrith in 1997 and 1998, respectively.

Greg has admitted that after his brother's death, "I was never the same player." Gould told The Sydney Morning Herald in 2020, "It's hard to talk about those days because we went from the highs to the lows very quickly. We won the club's first ever premiership then lost a special person in tragic circumstances the very next year. We were never the same people again." Liddiard told The Western Weekender in 2020 that he was diagnosed with post-traumatic stress disorder following the crash.

In the 2010s and 2020s, Greg Alexander and Brad Fittler appeared in several road safety awareness campaigns reflecting on how Alexander's death impacted them.

The Penrith Panthers' rookie of the year award is named for Alexander.
