= Peter Shiels =

Australian rugby league footballer

Personal information
- Full name: Peter Shiels
- Born: 4 September 1973 (age 52) Bankstown, New South Wales, Australia
- Height: 196 cm (6 ft 5 in)
- Weight: 108 kg (17 st 0 lb)

Playing information
- Position: Prop, Second-row
Club
Years	Team	Pld	T	G	FG	P
1993	Penrith Panthers	5	0	0	0	0
1994	Western Suburbs	6	0	0	0	0
1995–97	Western Reds	48	4	0	0	16
1998–00	Newcastle Knights	61	12	0	0	48
2001–02	St. Helens	47	11	0	0	44
	Total	167	27	0	0	108
- Spouse: Linda Alexander
- Relatives: Ben Alexander (brother-in-law); Greg Alexander (brother-in-law); Mark Geyer (brother-in-law); Mavrik Geyer (nephew)

Peter "Stretch" Shiels (born 4 September 1973 in Bankstown, New South Wales), is an Australian former rugby league footballer who played in the 1990s and 2000s. He played for the Penrith, Western Suburbs, Western Reds, the Newcastle Knights in Australia and St. Helens in the Super League as a second-row and as a prop.

As Super League V champions, St. Helens played against 2000 NRL Premiers, the Brisbane Broncos in the 2001 World Club Challenge. Shiels played at second-row in St. Helens' victory. Shiels played for St. Helens from the interchange bench in their 2002 Super League Grand Final victory against the Bradford Bulls.

== Personal life ==
Shiels is married to Linda (née Alexander), the sister of fellow former rugby league footballers, Ben Alexander and Greg Alexander.

Shiels now resides in Newcastle, New South Wales, where he works as a real estate agent. Shiels got his start in real estate with a local agency, and in 2020 he opted to create his own brand - Shiels+Co Property. The office is located in Whitebridge; and one of his employees is his eldest daughter, Ruby.
