= Daniel Caprice =

English rugby union player

- Born: Daniel Jonathan Caprice; 20 October 1989 (age 37) Chatham, Kent, England
- Height: 5 ft 10 in (1.78 m)
- Weight: 82 kg (12 st 13 lb; 181 lb)
- School: Chatham Grammar; Sevenoaks School

Rugby union career
- Position(s): Wing; Fullback
Senior career
Years	Team	Apps	(Points)
2005–2008	Saracens		
2009–2011	Blackheath	17	(55)
2011	Biarritz	5	(5)
2012–2013	London Welsh	7	(5)
Provincial / State sides
Years	Team	Apps	(Points)
2012	Northland	7	(5)
- Correct as of 13 October 2012
National sevens team
Years	Team		Comps
2009–2011	England		16

Daniel Caprice (born 20 October 1989 in Chatham, Kent) is a retired Rugby Union player who last played as Wing and fullback for London Welsh in the Aviva Premiership.

Dan began playing rugby aged 8 at Medway Rugby Club, Rochester. He moved on to Maidstone RFC aged 10, where he played as Wing. Dan left Chatham Grammar School for Boys in 2006 to take up the Findlay Sports Scholarship at Sevenoaks School in Kent.

Dan left Sevenoaks School with an International Baccalaureate Diploma. He trained full-time with the Saracens Academy.

Dan Caprice scored for Saracens in their draw against the British Army. Caprice also helped Saracens claim their first trophy in the Plate competition of the Middlesex Sevens. Caprice scored 3 tries in Blackheath's 85–24 win over Waterloo.

On 23 June 2011, Caprice signed for French Top 14 side Biarritz Olympique.

Caprice left Biarritz in the last year of his contract and moved to New Zealand in 2012 where he signed with ITM Cup side Northland.

He returned to the UK in November 2012 and joined London Welsh.

In 2016, Caprice trialled with Bradford Bulls. He entered as a contestant on 9Go! reality TV show The NRL Rookie.
