= Scott Murray (writer) =

British journalist and author

Scott Murray is a British freelance journalist specialising in sport and working predominantly for The Guardian.

== Books ==
Murray is the author of two sports-related books. He is the co-author, with Simon Farnaby, of The Phantom of the Open, the biography of Maurice Flitcroft, the so-called world's worst golfer. The book was published by Penguin in 2011 and turned into a film of the same name starring Sir Mark Rylance as Flitcroft. His second book, The Title: The Story of the First Division was published by Bloomsbury Sport in 2017.
