= Matt Geyer =

Australian rugby league footballer

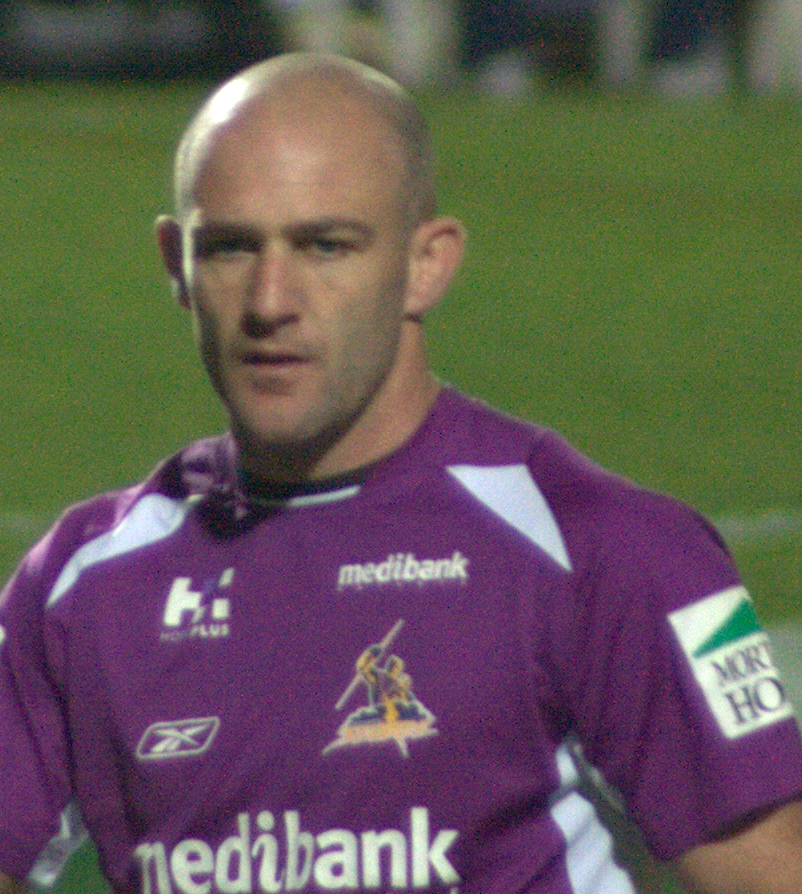

Personal information
- Full name: Matthew Geyer
- Born: 5 September 1975 (age 51) Blacktown, New South Wales, Australia
- Height: 182 cm (6 ft 0 in)
- Weight: 91 kg (14 st 5 lb)

Playing information
- Position: Wing, Five-eighth, Fullback, Centre
Club
Years	Team	Pld	T	G	FG	P
1997	Perth Reds	6	0	0	0	0
1998–08	Melbourne Storm	262	113	105	0	662
	Total	268	113	105	0	662
Representative
Years	Team	Pld	T	G	FG	P
2002–06	City Origin	2	0	1	0	2
1999	New South Wales	3	2	0	0	8
- Relatives: Mark Geyer (brother); Mavrik Geyer (nephew)

Matt Geyer (/ɡaɪər/) (born 5 September 1975) is an Australian former professional rugby league footballer. A New South Wales State of Origin representative wing, he played his club football primarily with the Melbourne Storm of the National Rugby League competition, winning the 1999 premiership with them. He also represented City Origin and played for the Western Reds.

== Background ==
Geyer is also the younger brother of rugby league personality Mark Geyer. Matt Geyer is also Cole Geyer’s Father. He is uncle to Penrith Panthers second rower Mav Geyer.

== Playing career ==
Geyer started his career in 1997 for the Western Reds in the Super League competition where his older brother Mark was captain. Upon the club's dissolution at the end of 1997 he became one of the foundation members of the Melbourne Storm when they started their first season in 1998. Since then, Geyer has become the most capped Melbourne Storm player, also holding the record for most tries for the club. Most of his career has been played at wing, but he has also played a large utility role at the club, including fullback, centre, five-eighth, halfback and hooker. While with the Storm he played for the Norths Devils in the 1998 Queensland Cup.

He became the first Storm player to lead the NRL's point-scoring for the season (1999), scoring 242 points in the season, this is a record that is yet to be broken. That season he also played in all three State of Origin matches for New South Wales, scoring two tries.

Geyer played at five-eighth in the 1999 NRL Grand Final and kicked the winning conversion to earn the Storm a premiership in only their second year in the NRL competition (in which he was the leading pointscorer for the season). He replaced Craig Smith, who had been knocked out (resulting in the Storm being awarded a penalty try). Geyer became the Storm's first player to make 200 appearances, against the Cronulla-Sutherland Sharks at Melbourne's Olympic Park in 2006. That season he was only remaining player from the 1999 grand final squad to also be a part of the Storm's 2006 NRL Grand Final loss to the Broncos. In 2007 Melbourne again reached the grand final and won against the Sea Eagles but the premiership was later stripped for major breaches of the salary cap.

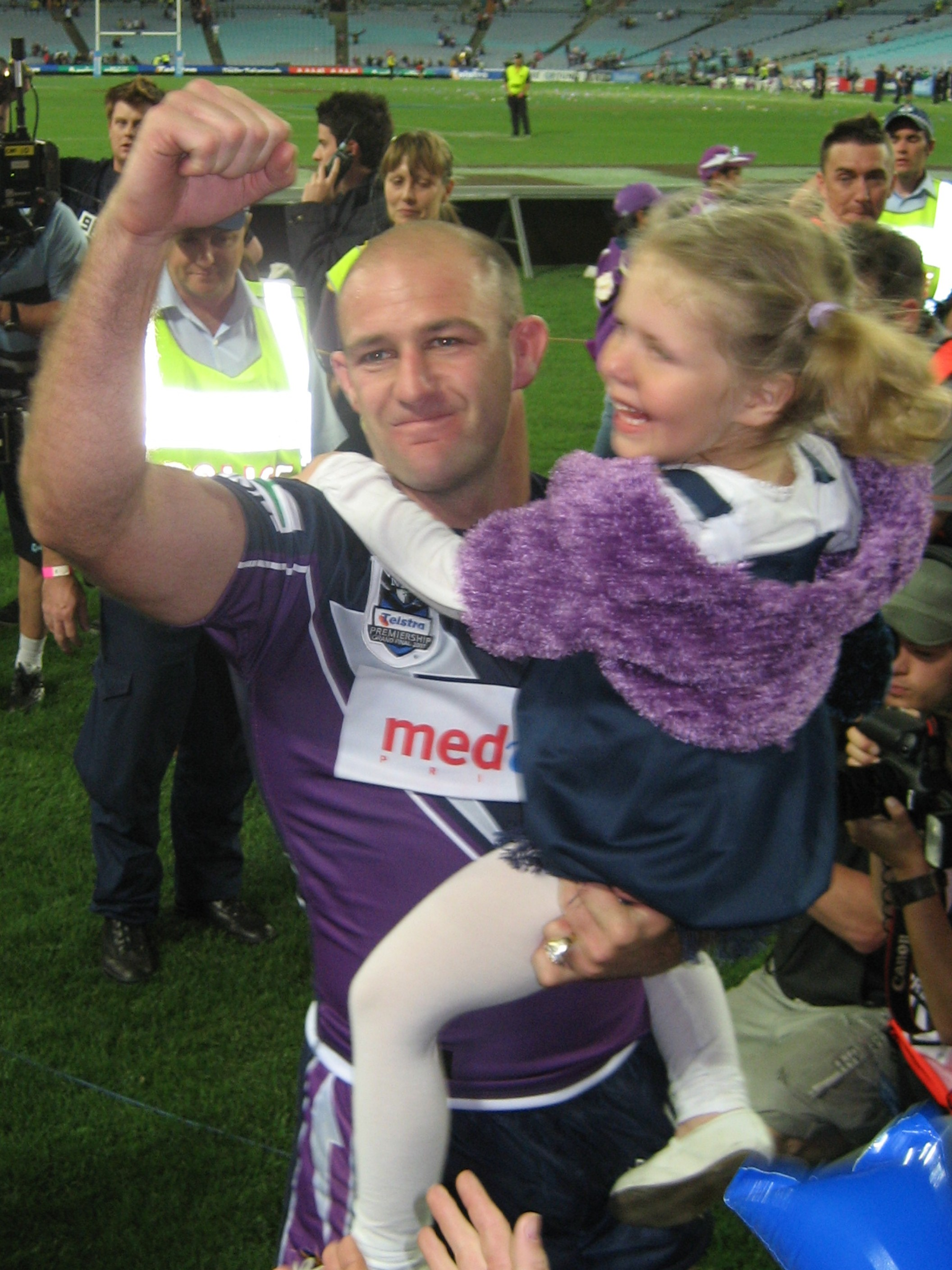
Geyer with his daughter celebrating the 2007 Grand Final

During the 2008 season, Geyer had been playing off the interchange bench as he had for the 2007 finals series. After Will Chambers' season-ending injury, Geyer took up his centre position for the remainder of the season. On 14 July 2008 he became the first Melbourne Storm player to play 250 games. He played in the 2008 NRL Grand Final defeat by Manly and retired at conclusion of the 2008 season. He left Melbourne as the club's all-time top try scorer.

In July 2009, Geyer revealed that he had made himself available for the Gold Coast Titans in the National Rugby League. However he ended up retiring in Queensland after playing in the Queensland Cup for the Norths Devils.

== Post playing ==
He was involved in coaching junior rugby league at the Currumbin Eagles JRL club where he had success in getting his teams to the Grand finals and ultimately winning his first premiership as a coach in the 2013 season, backing up again as premiership coach in 2014 and 2017 where his U16's team were crowned undefeated premiers for the 2017 season. Geyer's success as a coach continued into the 2018 season with the U17's playing group boasting the only U17's in the Gold Coast competition to field teams in every division and as well as being 2018 Premiers of all divisions. Geyer's U19's senior squad tasted success also, being crowned premiers and being the first Currumbin Eagles senior team to win a grand final in 2018 and then going back-to-back taking out the U20 Premiership again in 2019.

As a result, a large number of Geyer's premiership winning teams have been accepted into Sporting Excellence programs at high schools such as Palm Beach – Currumbin High School), with several of Geyer's former and current players going on to gain Queensland Schoolboy and Queensland U16 (2017), U18 QLD Schoolboys (Xavier Coates, Tom Dearden, Juwan Compain, Toby Sexton), U18 State of Origin representative honors (Xavier Coates and Tom Dearden) and 2018 U18 Australian Schoolboys (Tom Dearden and Juwan Compain, 2019 U18 School Boys (Toby Sexton) as well as Gold Coast Vikings and SEQ Kookaburra's representation. A number of Geyer's playing squad born in 2001 have gained NRL contracts with the Titans, Broncos and Bulldogs with Tom Dearden and Xavier Coates making their NRL debut for the Broncos. Also known as Boofa, he now works as a maths/HPE teacher at Marymount College, Gold Coast in Queensland, where his success as a coach has continued with his teams winning the Titans Cup back to back for the 2017, 2018 and 2019 seasons.

== Statistics ==
=== NRL ===
Statistics are correct to the end of the 2014 season

†	Denotes seasons in which Geyer won an NRL Premiership
†	Denotes seasons in which Geyer won an NRL Premiership that was later stripped

Season	Team	Matches	T	G	GK %	F/G	Pts	W	L	D	W-L %
1997	Perth	6	0	0	—	0	0	2	4	0	33.3
1998	Melbourne	11	2	0	—	0	8	7	4	0	63.6
1999†	Melbourne	26	20	81	61.4	0	242	18	8	0	69.2
2000	Melbourne	27	14	6	66.7	0	68	14	12	1	53.7
2001	Melbourne	26	14	2	66.7	0	60	11	14	1	44.2
2002	Melbourne	19	3	0	—	0	12	7	11	1	39.5
2003	Melbourne	26	14	5	55.6	0	66	16	10	0	61.5
2004	Melbourne	21	8	0	—	0	32	12	9	0	57.1
2005	Melbourne	26	11	2	100	0	48	14	12	0	53.8
2006	Melbourne	27	11	8	66.7	0	60	22	5	0	81.5
2007†	Melbourne	25	8	0	—	0	32	23	2	0	92.0
2008	Melbourne	28	8	1	100	0	34	19	9	0	67.9
Career totals		268	113	105	62.50	0	662	165	100	3	62.13

=== State of Origin ===
Season	Team	Matches	T	G	GK %	F/G	Pts	W	L	D	W-L %
1999	New South Wales	3	2	0	—	0	8	1	1	1	50.0
Career totals		3	2	0	—	0	8	1	1	1	50.00
