= Scott Murray (rugby league, Penrith) =

Australian rugby league footballer

Personal information
- Born: c. 1972–73

Playing information
Club
Years	Team	Pld	T	G	FG	P
1992	Penrith Panthers	1	0	0	0	0

Scott Murray (born c. 1972–73) is an Australian former professional rugby league footballer who played one game for the Penrith Panthers in 1992.

Murray made his only first-grade appearance for Penrith in the club's round nine loss to North Sydney on 31 May 1992.

On 21 June 1992, three weeks after debuting, Murray was a passenger in the car crash that killed his teammate Ben Alexander. The Canberra Times reported that Murray suffered a broken jaw in the crash, while The Sydney Morning Herald stated that he attended Alexander's funeral in a wheelchair due to having a broken left leg.
