= Paul Hauff =

Australia international rugby league footballer

Personal information
- Born: 9 May 1970 (age 56) Cairns, Queensland, Australia

Playing information
- Height: 197 cm (6 ft 5 1/2 in)
- Weight: 101 kg (15 st 13 lb)
- Position: Fullback
Club
Years	Team	Pld	T	G	FG	P
1990–96	Brisbane Broncos	51	19	0	0	76
1995–96	London Broncos	13	13	0	0	52
	Total	64	32	0	0	128
Representative
Years	Team	Pld	T	G	FG	P
1991	Queensland	3	1	0	0	4
1991	Australia	1	0	0	0	0

Paul Hauff (born 9 May 1970) is an Australian former professional rugby league footballer who played in the 1990s. A Queensland State of Origin and Australian international representative fullback, he played his whole top-level career in Australia for the Brisbane Broncos, later moving to their sister club in England, the London Broncos.

== Early life ==
Hauff was born in Cairns, Queensland. He played his junior football with Cairns Saints.

== Playing career ==
A gangly fullback, Hauff was graded with the Brisbane Broncos in 1990, being named along with Willie Carne as the club's joint rookie of the year. He marked his first grade début for Brisbane with a three-try performance against the Newcastle Knights at Marathon Stadium, helping the Broncos to a resounding 28–4 win over the Knights. Standing at 197 cm (6 ft 5 1/2 in) tall, Hauff is the tallest fullback on record at State of Origin level. Hauff also served with the Queensland Police.

During the 1991 NSWRL season Hauff was playing well enough to be selected to play for Queensland at fullback in all three games of the 1991 State of Origin series which the Maroons won. He was then selected as the Australia national team's fullback for the first game of the 1991 Trans-Tasman Test series. The game was his one and only Test for Australia.

In 1992, Hauff required a total shoulder reconstruction after suffering an injury in the Broncos 20–18 win over St George at the Adelaide Oval in Round 8 (24 May) saw him miss out on the Broncos' premiership success. Injuries, and the form of Julian O'Neill playing fullback saw Hauff restricted to just 13 games for the Broncos between 1993 and 1996. Hauff then signed to play with Brisbane's sister club, the London Broncos in 1996, scoring 13 tries for the club.

== Post playing ==
In 2000 he was awarded the Australian Sports Medal for his contribution to Australia's international standing in rugby league.

Hauff returned to being a police officer, serving in the Queensland Police.
