= The Phantom of the Open =

2021 film

- UK theatrical release poster
- Directed by: Craig Roberts
- Written by: Simon Farnaby
- Based on: The Phantom of the Open: Maurice Flitcroft, The World's Worst Golfer by: Simon Farnaby; Scott Murray
- Produced by: Tom Miller; Nichola Martin; Kate Glover
- Starring: Mark Rylance; Sally Hawkins; Rhys Ifans; Jake Davies; Christian Lees; Jonah Lees; Mark Lewis Jones; Johann Myers
- Cinematography: Kit Fraser
- Edited by: Jonathan Amos
- Music by: Isobel Waller-Bridge
- Production companies: BFI; BBC Film; Ingenious Media; Water & Power Productions; Baby Cow Films; Cornerstone Films
- Distributed by: Entertainment One
- Release dates: 12 October 2021 (LFF); 18 March 2022
- Running time: 102 minutes
- Country: United Kingdom
- Language: English
- Box office: $4 million

The Phantom of the Open is a 2021 British biographical comedy-drama film directed by Craig Roberts, about the exploits of Maurice Flitcroft. The screenplay by Simon Farnaby was based upon the biography The Phantom of the Open: Maurice Flitcroft, The World's Worst Golfer by Farnaby and Scott Murray. The film stars Mark Rylance, Sally Hawkins, Rhys Ifans, Jake Davies, Christian and Jonah Lees, Mark Lewis Jones and Johann Myers.

The Phantom of the Open had its world premiere at the 65th BFI London Film Festival on 12 October 2021, and was released in the United Kingdom on 18 March 2022, by Entertainment One. It received positive reviews.

== Plot ==
In 1970s Britain, Maurice Flitcroft (Mark Rylance) works as a crane operator for Vickers in Barrow-in-Furness. He insists on bringing up his sons to believe that they can become whatever they want to be. His step-son Michael has achieved strong academic qualifications and is a rapidly rising manager at the Vickers yard, while disco-loving twin sons Gene and James are encouraged to chase glory in dancing competitions. All the while, Maurice is supported by his loyal and quietly optimistic wife, Jean (Sally Hawkins).

Warned by Michael that an impending nationalisation of Vickers could result in him becoming redundant, Maurice is unsure of what he could turn to before watching the British Open on TV. Learning of its £10,000 winning prize, he reasons that golf cannot be a hard sport to learn and decides to enter the following year. Learning golf from an instruction book, he begins by practicing on the local beach and on nearby fields. Put off by the elitist entry requirements of his local golf club, he unsuccessfully attempts to sneak onto the course after closing to practice.

With the tournament approaching and unsure of how to enter, Maurice writes a letter to the BBC golf presenter; he consequently learns that all he needs to do is fill in an application form. After obtaining a form, he sidesteps the requirement for amateur entrants to declare their handicap by claiming he is a professional. Though The Royal and Ancient Golf Club of St Andrews have never heard of him, they reason that no-one would ever dare lie on the application form and accept his entry into the 1976 Open without investigation. At the tournament, Maurice achieves a score of 121 - the worst score by a "professional" golfer in the tournament's history. With the tournament broadcast live on TV, his performance has several effects - Michael is humiliated and is advised by his managers to distance himself from Maurice for the sake of his career, but the sporting public is captivated by Maurice, resulting in a spate of interviews and articles in the national press.

Enraged by his sudden popularity and by his blithe declaration that he will return to the tournament the following year, the R&A ban him from the tournament and have him blocked from membership at all golf courses in the country. Refusing to give up on his new hobby, he continues to train and in following years he re-enters the tournament by assuming a series of fake names and disguises, while attempting to raise his profile by pursuing media appearances. Though he eventually begins to record creditable scores at tournaments, his antics cause Vickers to add him to the list of redundancies and lead Michael to further distance himself from his family.

A decade later, Maurice and Jean have been reduced to living in a caravan. Though Gene and James had become disco world champions and achieved the globe-trotting lifestyle Maurice once dreamed of, the decline of disco as a music form means the tournaments they thrived on have now all been abandoned, and they have been left with no source of income. Their return home leads the family to reunite, where Michael criticises them all for their impractical dreams. Close to accepting defeat, Maurice receives a letter from America which informs him that his performances led to the creation of a new golf tournament which can only be won by playing badly. Maurice and his family are flown out in first class and treated as celebrities while Maurice is accorded the honour of being key-note speaker at a meal in his own honour. Michael reconciles with his family and attends the event after he finds that even serious businesspeople now see his step-father not as a figure of humiliation but one of inspiration.

== Cast ==
- Mark Rylance as Maurice Flitcroft
- Sally Hawkins as Jean Flitcroft
- Rhys Ifans as Keith Mackenzie
- Jake Davies as Michael Flitcroft
- Christian Lees as Gene Flitcroft
- Jonah Lees as James Flitcroft
- Mark Lewis Jones as Cliff
- Johann Myers as Willie
- Nigel Betts as Tony Marsh
- Steve Oram as Gerald Hopkins
- Tim Steed as John Pegg
- Simon Farnaby as Lambert

== Production ==
In May 2020, it was announced Craig Roberts would direct the film, from a screenplay by Simon Farnaby based upon his biographical book The Phantom of the Open: Maurice Flitcroft, The World's Worst Golfer. Flitcroft's son, James, was used as a consultant. In June 2020, Mark Rylance joined the cast of the film. In October 2020, Sally Hawkins, Rhys Ifans, Jake Davies, Christian Lees, Jonah Lees, Mark Lewis Jones and Johann Myers, joined the cast of the film, with Entertainment One set to distribute in the United Kingdom and the Universal Pictures Content Group striking a deal for multiple territories including Germany, Austria, Italy, the Benelux, Greece, Portugal, Turkey, Eastern Europe, Latin America, India, Indonesia, Taiwan, Africa, Australia, New Zealand, the Middle East, Israel, the CIS and the Baltics.

Principal photography began in October 2020.

== Release ==
In July 2021, Sony Pictures Classics acquired distribution rights to the film for North America, Thailand, France and China. It was released in the United States on June 3, 2022.

The Phantom of the Open had its world premiere at the 65th BFI London Film Festival on 12 October 2021.

== Reception ==
On review aggregator Rotten Tomatoes, 86% of 134 critic reviews are positive, with an average rating of 7.10/10. The website’s critical consensus states, "Led by a stellar performance from Mark Rylance, The Phantom of the Open turns a stranger-than-fiction true story into crowd-pleasing entertainment." Metacritic, which uses a weighted average, assigned the film a score of 65 out of 100 based on 11 critics, indicating "generally favorable reviews”. The Guardian's Simran Hans rated the film 4/5, praising Rylance's decision to play his character straight, and complimenting the accompanying musical score.
