= Laurie Daley =

Australian Rugby League personality

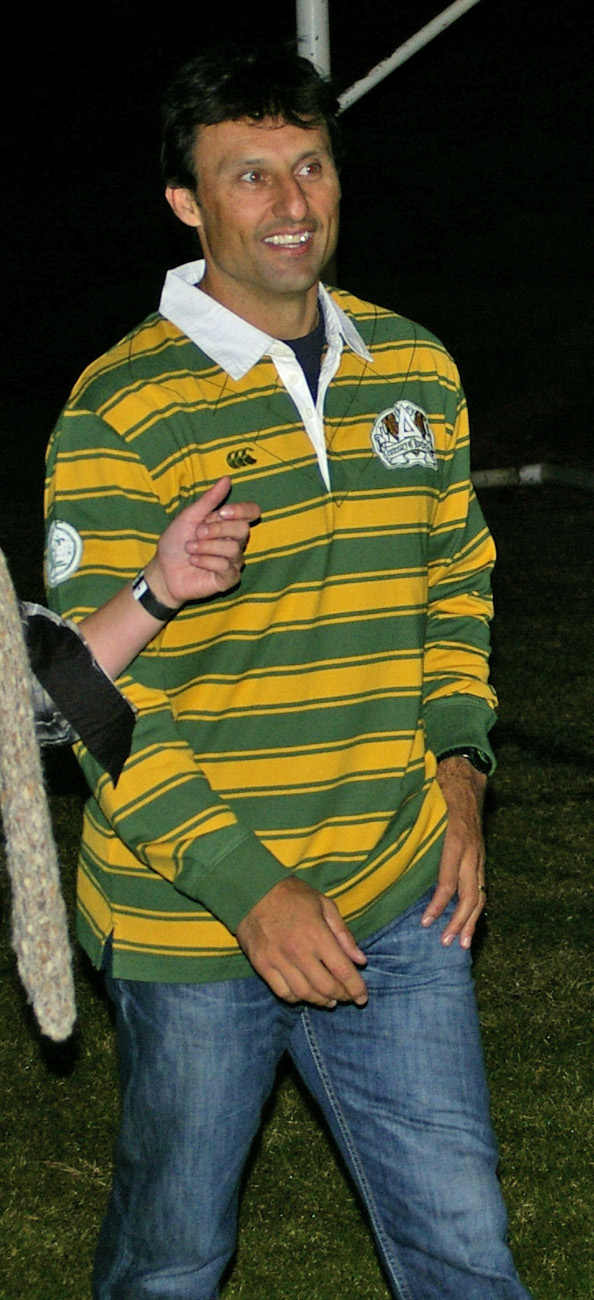
- Daley at rugby league centenary celebrations in 2008

Personal information
- Full name: Laurie William Daley
- Born: 20 October 1969 (age 57) Junee, New South Wales, Australia
- Height: 183 cm (6 ft 0 in)
- Weight: 92 kg (14 st 7 lb)

Playing information
- Position: Five-eighth, Centre
Club
Years	Team	Pld	T	G	FG	P
1987–00	Canberra Raiders	246	87	44	9	445
Representative
Years	Team	Pld	T	G	FG	P
1988–96	NSW Country	7	3	0	0	12
1989–99	New South Wales	23	6	1	0	26
1990–99	Australia	21	11	0	2	46
1997	NSW (SL)	3	0	0	0	0
1997	Australia (SL)	5	4	0	0	16

Coaching information
Representative
Years	Team	Gms	W	D	L	W%
2008–12	NSW Country	5	2	1	2	40
2011–22	Indigenous All Stars	10	4	1	5	40
2013–17	New South Wales	15	6	0	9	40
2013–14	Prime Ministers XIII	2	2	0	0	100
2025–26	New South Wales	6	3	0	3	50
- Source: As of 22 November 2026

Laurie William Daley AM (born 20 October 1969), also known by the nickname "Loz", is an Australian professional rugby league football coach and a former player who played as a centre and five-eighth in the late 1980s, 1990s, and early 2000s.

He represented Australia on 26 occasions and has since been named as one of the nation's finest of the 20th century. Daley played for the Canberra Raiders during their most successful period in the 1990s.

== Early life ==
Daley was born in Junee, New South Wales, Australia to a caucasian father from the small village of Nangus, New South Wales and an Indigenous (Wiradjuri) mother from the former Aboriginal Mission Wantabadgery, Wantabadgery, New South Wales. Daley is the sixth of eight children. He is the only boy amongst seven sisters.

He began playing Australian rules football at school age before switching to rugby league where he played with the Junee Diesels developing a passion for the sport. At just the age of 15 he was promoted to first grade.

== Playing career ==
Daley was playing representative rugby league at age 18 in 1988 when he was selected to represent NSW Country in the annual City vs Country Origin game. He was the second highest try-scorer in the 1989 NSWRL season with sixteen tries, only one less than teammate Gary Belcher. He tasted premiership success with the Raiders 1989 in an extra-time game which saw Canberra defeat the Balmain Tigers 19–14, and in the ensuing celebrations the Winfield Cup was smashed, not by Daley dropping it as was reported by the press, but when it fell from the rear tray of Ford T-bucket hot rod both were riding in when the hot rod hit a bump in the road. In the post season he travelled with the Raiders to England for the 1989 World Club Challenge, playing at centre in Canberra's 18–30 loss to Widnes at the Old Trafford stadium in Manchester.

Daley played his first games for New South Wales in the 1989 State of Origin series.

=== 1990s ===
Part way through the 1990 NSWRL Premiership season at age 20 Daley made his first appearance for Australia at five-eighth against France in the NSW country town of Parkes, scoring a try on début. He would then play against New Zealand a month later in Wellington. At the end of the 1990 season where the Raiders won their second consecutive Grand Final, Daley won the Raiders' player of the year award and was then selected for the 1990 Kangaroo Tour. He missed Australia's opening loss to Great Britain at Wembley Stadium due to a broken hand suffered in a previous tour match against Leeds, but played centre for three tests on tour (two against Great Britain and one against France). The broken hand, and later a hamstring injury which saw him miss the second Test against France, restricted him to just 6 games on tour, 3 club games (against St Helens, Wigan and Leeds) and the 3 tests.

During the 1990 season, Canberra coach Tim Sheens shifted Daley from centre to five-eighth at the Raiders and popular theory was that he was being groomed to eventually take over the Test five-eighth role from Wally Lewis who was coming to the end of his career. Daley helped the Raiders to back-to-back premierships when they defeated Penrith 18–14 in the Grand Final at the Sydney Football Stadium. Following the Kangaroo Tour, Daley suffered a number of niggling injuries during the early part of the 1991 season, though he played well enough to retain his place in the NSW side for the 1991 State of Origin series (won 2–1 by Queensland), and although overlooked for the opining Trans-Tasman series test against New Zealand in Melbourne, was recalled into the side in the centres for the final two tests in Sydney and at Lang Park in Brisbane. After losing in Melbourne, the Australians (with Daley one of their stars) won 44–0 in Sydney and 40–12 in Brisbane. Canberra then limped into the Finals in defence of their crown, but suddenly found form and won high scoring games over Manly-Warringah and North Sydney to again face Penrith in the Grand Final. However, with Ricky Stuart taking a groin injury into the game and Daley doing the same with a dodgy hamstring, the Raiders were eventually no match for the Royce Simmons and Greg Alexander inspired Panthers who won the day 19–12. Daley's injury meant he was ruled out of the season ending Kangaroo tour of Papua New Guinea.

During the 1992 Great Britain Lions tour of Australia and New Zealand, he helped Australia retain The Ashes. Affected severely by a knee injury in 1992, which saw him unable to fulfill his contract at Wakefield Trinity, and miss Australia's World Cup final win over Great Britain at Wembley following the 1992 NSWRL season, 1992 also saw Daley take over the captaincy of the NSW Origin team and after being knocked out during the first game in Sydney, Daley recovered to lead the Blues to a 2–1 series win over Queensland now captained by Canberra teammate and Australian team captain Mal Meninga.

Daley recovered from injury to captain Australia in the absence of suspended captain Meninga in the first Test against New Zealand in 1993, kicking the match-saving field goal and saving Australia from an embarrassing 14–13 loss (it was also his second field goal of the game). 1994 was again plagued by injury. For the third year running he captained NSW to an Origin series win over Queensland, before representing Australia in a mid season test against France at the Parramatta Stadium in Sydney. Following the test Daley underwent knee surgery, and recovered in time to help the Raiders easily win the Grand Final over Canterbury-Bankstown 36–12, scoring a 50-metre try in the first half and showing that he was back to 100% fitness.

Following the Grand Final win, Daley was selected, along with six of his Canberra team-mates (Kangaroo captain Meninga, Ricky Stuart, Steve Walters, Brett Mullins and David Furner), to the successful 1994 Kangaroo Tour. As the incumbent NSW captain, Daley was selected as the vice-captain on the tour. His 1994 tour was a happier one than 1990 with Daley playing in 9 games including all 4 tests on the tour.

In 1995, Ricky Stuart was preferred for the Canberra captaincy after Meninga's retirement, even though Daley had captained both New South Wales and Australia ahead of Stuart. Furthermore, the outbreak of the Super League War and Daley's subsequent support for the rival organisation saw him barred from representative games in 1995, including the World Cup at the end of the season. This was despite Daley and other Super League aligned players successfully taking the Australian Rugby League to court in a bid to be eligible for selection. While the ARL was forced to consider SL players, they weren't forced to select them, thus players like Daley missed a full year of representative games. Nonetheless, Daley was awarded the Raiders' player of the year award in 1995, 1996 and 1997.

In 1996, Super League players were once again allowed to compete in representative fixtures sanctioned by the ARL, allowing Daley to compete in State of Origin. Even though Daley was the incumbent New South Wales captain from 1992 to 1994, Brad Fittler, who had also been appointed Australian captain in 1995, was retained as NSW captain. The following year, the Super League competition was launched, and Daley was appointed to captain the Super League representative teams of both New South Wales and Australia, winning their respective competitions. It was also this year Daley became a father, welcoming daughter Jaimee Frances Daley into the world on 27 May. In the opening match of the Super League Test series against Great Britain at the end of the 1997 season, The Australian side wore black armbands in memory of Daley's grandmother who'd died two days before. He captained the side and scored a hat-trick that match in The Kangaroos' emphatic victory. Daley alo scored a try in Australia's victory in the third and deciding match.

In 1998, Super League and the Australian Rugby League agreed to combine to launch the National Rugby League competition. Daley took over the Canberra captaincy on a full-time basis after Stuart signed with Canterbury in 1999 and was once again named the Raiders' player of the year. This was also the year Laurie married his wife Michelle and welcomed their first daughter, Caitlin Rose Daley, on 17 December 1999. Although Daley continued to make representative appearances, injuries began to limit his opportunities; and he was forced into retirement in 2000. In September of that year, his book, Laurie: Always a Winner was published.

== Post-playing ==
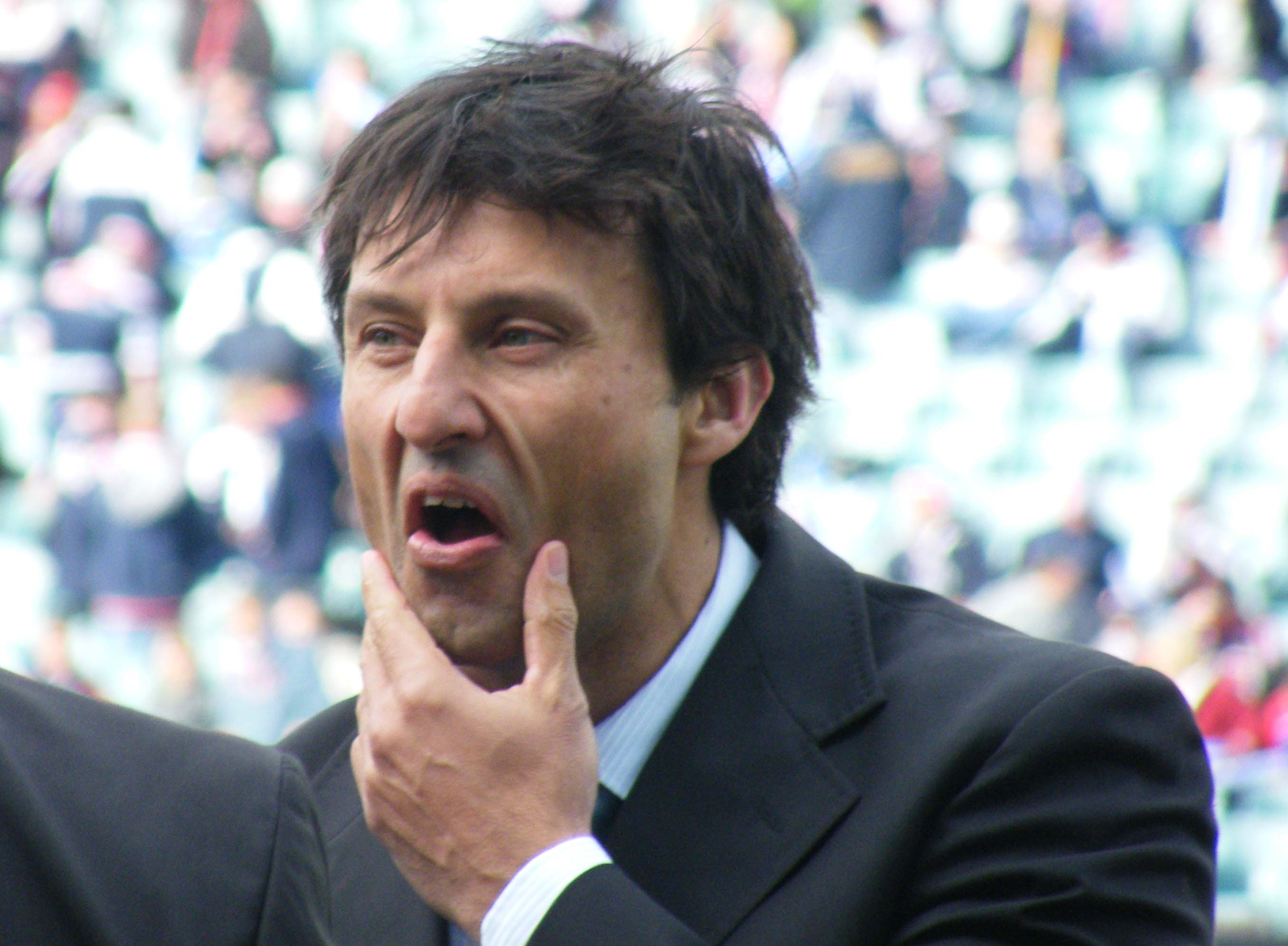
Laurie Daley working for the Nine Network

In September 2007, Daley left his commentary position with Fox Sports and signed a contract with the Nine Network to co-present much of their rugby league coverage, from appearing on the weekly rugby league topic show The Footy Show, to commentating on Nine's weekend league coverage.

However, on 21 August 2012 Daley was appointed the NSW State of Origin coach from 2013, taking over from former Canberra teammate Ricky Stuart who, under NSW policy of their Origin coach not being a current NRL club coach, was ruled out after agreeing to coach the Parramatta Eels in 2013. Daley got the job in preference to other candidates including Trent Barrett, Brad Fittler and Daniel Anderson. Daley led the Blues to their first series win in 2014, finally breaking the QLD dynasty and delivering the Blues their first series win since 2005.

In 2014, Daley became only the second man after Wayne Pearce to play, captain and coach a Blues side to a series win over Queensland.

In 2015, Daley coached New South Wales to a Game 3 decider against Queensland after a spirited comeback in Game 2 but The Blues were defeated 52–6 in a record breaking Origin loss. In 2016, New South Wales were once again defeated by Queensland but the NSWRL board still backed Daley as the man to take the side forward. In 2017, NSW were widely tipped to win the series due to Queensland having suffered injuries to star players and won the first game with an emphatic 28–4 victory in Brisbane. In game 2, New South Wales surrendered a 16–6 halftime lead to lose 18–16. In Game 3, NSW lost the series to Queensland after being defeated 22–6 in Brisbane. On 25 August 2017, Daley was terminated as New South Wales coach after only winning 6 out of 15 games and winning only 1 out of 5 series. His replacement was Brad Fittler, who coached NSW to three out of six series victories over the Queensland Maroons (2018, 2019 and 2021)

Since February 2018, Daley has co-hosted the Big Sports Breakfast on Sky Sports Radio in Sydney.

In 2022, he coached the Kangaroo alumni vs. Kiwis alumni Match Fit squad.

In February 2024, he was appointed to the International Rugby League Board as an independent director.

On 2 December 2024, Daley was announced to be returning to the NSW State of Origin head coach role after Michael Maguire stepped down to coach the Brisbane Broncos.

Before the start of the 2025 State of Origin series, New South Wales were tipped to win the series by many pundits. New South Wales would win the opening match against Queensland quite comfortably, however they would lose the remaining two matches in the series. Daley was later criticised for his team selections, tactics and omitting players from the squad such as Terrell May.

On 8 July 2026, Daley led New South Wales to victory against Queensland at Suncorp Stadium, capping off a 2-1 series victory against the Maroons, recording his second State of Origin title. Daley's coaching decisions and selections over the course of the series were the subject of a numerous debates and criticisms; despite the side's victory.

Daley announced his retirement as coach of the New South Wales Blues in August 2026.

== Accolades ==
In February 2008, Daley was named in the list of Australia's 100 Greatest Players (1908–2007) which was commissioned by the NRL and ARL to celebrate the code's centenary year in Australia.

In August 2008, Daley was named at five-eighth in the Indigenous Team of the Century.

On 11 January 2013, the local football ground in his home town of Junee was renamed Laurie Daley Oval.

Sporting positions
Preceded by Ricky Stuart	Canberra Raiders captain 1998–2000	Succeeded by Simon Woolford
Preceded by Mal Meninga	Captain Australia; 1993-1998	Succeeded by Brad Fittler
