= Brad Fittler =

Australia international rugby league player and coach

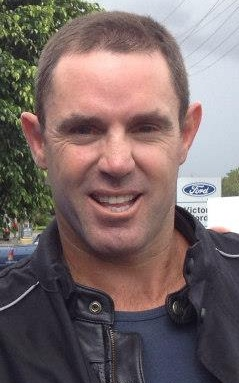

Personal information
- Full name: Bradley Scott Fittler
- Born: 5 February 1972 (age 54) Auburn, New South Wales, Australia

Playing information
- Height: 186 cm (6 ft 1 in)
- Weight: 96 kg (212 lb; 15 st 2 lb)
- Position: Five-eighth, Lock, Centre
Club
Years	Team	Pld	T	G	FG	P
1989–95	Penrith Panthers	119	31	5	2	136
1996–04	Sydney Roosters	217	91	9	8	390
	Total	336	122	14	10	526
Representative
Years	Team	Pld	T	G	FG	P
1990–04	New South Wales	31	8	0	2	34
1990–01	Australia	38	17	1	1	71
1991–97	NSW City	7	1	0	0	4

Coaching information
Club
Years	Team	Gms	W	D	L	W%
2007–09	Sydney Roosters	58	25	1	32	43
Representative
Years	Team	Gms	W	D	L	W%
2012–17	NSW City	7	3	1	3	43
2017–20	Lebanon	5	2	0	3	40
2018–23	New South Wales	18	9	0	9	50
2024	Prime Minister's XIII	1	1	0	0	100

Bradley Scott Fittler (born 5 February 1972), also known by the nickname of "Freddy", is an Australian rugby league commentator, television presenter, and former player.

Fittler captained both New South Wales and Australia, and in 2000 was awarded the Golden Boot. He retired as the most-capped New South Wales State of Origin player and third-most-capped Australian international player. Fittler won two Rugby League World Cups as a team captain; he captained the Kangaroos to victory in both the 1995 and 2000 finals, and was also a member of the victorious 1992 team. In 2008, he was named among the finest rugby league footballers of the first century of rugby league in Australia., and has been inducted into the NSWRL Hall of Fame.

Since retiring from playing, Fittler has also coached the Sydney Roosters in the NRL and New South Wales, with whom he won three State of Origin series.

== Early life ==
Fittler was born in Auburn, New South Wales, Australia. He grew up with his 2 siblings, Nathan and Kathleen Fittler.

Fittler was talented all-round junior sportsman. He played representative cricket for Southern Districts with Mark Bosnich, who later played football for the Socceroos and Manchester United, and played representative football for Melita Eagles. He played junior rugby league for a number of clubs in the Parramatta JRL District including, Sadleir Bulldogs, Dayments, Ashcroft Stallions and Mt. Pritchard Community Club (Mounties) before moving to Cambridge Park in the Penrith JRL District. While attending Ashcroft High School, St Dominic's College then later, McCarthy Catholic Senior High School Emu Plains, Fittler played for the Australian Schoolboys team in 1988 and 1989.

== Playing career ==
=== Penrith Panthers ===
Brad Fittler's first grade career started in 1989 at the Penrith Panthers while he was still attending McCarthy Catholic Senior High School in the western suburbs of Sydney.

Fittler played in the centres in Penrith's 18–14 loss to the Canberra Raiders in the 1990 Grand Final and at the end of the season was selected for Australia and went on the 1990 Kangaroo tour of Great Britain and France. Fittler did not play in a test on the tour, but played in 8 tour games and scored 8 tries.

In 1991, he was part the Panthers' premiership winning-side. Fittler played in the centres as Penrith, under the coaching of Phil Gould won their first ever premiership. At the end of the season, he was selected for the Kangaroos five game tour of Papua New Guinea and made his test debut for Australia, playing at lock in Australia's two test series victory over the Papua New Guinea Kumuls, scoring two tries on debut at the Danny Leahy Oval in Goroka. Fittler played in all five games during the two-week tour and scored 4 tries.

During the 1992 Great Britain Lions tour of Australia and New Zealand, he helped Australia retain The Ashes. Fittler, like the rest of the Penrith club, endured a tough 1992 season due to the death of his best mate, up-and-coming halfback/hooker Ben Alexander, the younger brother of Penrith captain Greg Alexander. Following Alexander's death in a car accident, Penrith's form dropped off in the second half of the season with the defending premiers finishing out of the finals in 9th place. As a result of Alexander's death which happened between the first and second Ashes tests, Fittler was left out of the second test team by his own request, but returned to the team in the deciding match in Brisbane which Australia won 16–10 to retain The Ashes.

At the end of the 1992 season, Fittler was selected in Australia's World Cup final team to play Great Britain at Wembley Stadium. In front of a then international record attendance of 73,631 the Australians retained the Rugby League World Cup with a hard-fought 10–6 win. During the first half, Fittler suffered a fractured cheekbone after being hit with an elbow from Lions hooker Martin Dermott who had gone into tackle the Australian Five-eighth with his elbow cocked. After being checked by team doctor Nathan Gibbs, Fittler continued playing.

The 1993 NSWRL season again saw the Panthers struggle, finishing 12th with a 7–15 record for the year. Fittler played all three games for NSW in their 2–1 Origin series win over Queensland, before playing in all three mid-year tests against New Zealand with Australia winning the series 2–0 after the first test at the Mount Smart Stadium in Auckland ended in a 14-all draw thanks to a late field goal by stand in Australian captain Laurie Daley.

Penrith improved to a 10–10–2 record and an 8th-place finish in the 1994 NSWRL season, despite the late season walk-out of Phil Gould (who was moving to coach the Sydney City Roosters after falling out with the Penrith club board) who was replaced with Fittler's 1991 premiership teammate Royce Simmons. During the year he was selected at lock for a test against France at Sydney's Parramatta Stadium (won 58–0 by Australia) and at the end of the season he was selected for his second Kangaroo Tour. Fittler played at lock in all four tests against Great Britain (3) and France (1) on the tour, winning man of the match in Australia's 38–8 win in the second test at Old Trafford in Manchester to keep the Ashes series alive. The Kangaroos went on to win the third test 23–4 to retain the Ashes before demolishing France with a world record 74–0 win in Béziers. Fittler played in 12 games on tour (one as a replacement), scoring two tries. He was also named as Man of the Match playing at lock in Australia's non-test international played against Wales in Cardiff, scoring one of his tours two tries in the wet conditions (his only other try would come in the tours 3rd last game in France when he scored against a Catalans Seclection in a 60–16 win at the Stade Gilbert Brutus in Perpignan).

By 1995, Fittler was the world's highest-paid rugby league player, reportedly earning $1.05 million for the season. This was during the period of the Super League war when player payments rose to previously unheard of levels as both the Australian Rugby League (ARL), backed by media billionaire Kerry Packer, and the rebel Super League (SL), backed by News Ltd., signed up players for (in some cases) double or triple their previous contracts. Fittler signed with the Australian Rugby League.

With the ARL refusing to select SL aligned players for representative football, Fittler was given the captaincy of the NSW Origin team for the 1995 State of Origin series against Queensland. Coached by rookie coach Paul Vautin, and with a bunch of untried players thanks to not being able to call upon their usual Origin and test stars (mostly from the SL aligned Brisbane Broncos), Qld were not given any chance of defeating the Blues (who could still call on a number of experienced Origin and test players), but came away with a 3–0 whitewash for their first series win since 1991. However, despite this, Fittler was given the Australian captaincy for the 3-test Trans-Tasman series against New Zealand making him Australia's youngest captain (23) since Reg Gasnier had first captained Australia in 1962. Fittler led the Kangaroos to a 3–0 sweep of the Kiwis, including winning man of the match in the 20–10 second test win at the Sydney Football Stadium.

At the end of the 1995 ARL season, Fittler was an automatic choice to captain Australia in the 1995 Rugby League World Cup. Although the Kangaroos suffered a shock 20–16 loss to England in the opening game of the tournament at Wembley, and had a nervous, 30–20 win over New Zealand in extra-time in the Semi-final in Huddersfield after scores had been locked at 20-all at the end of regulation time, Fittler would lead Australia to its 8th World Cup success (and 5th in a row) with an 18–8 win over England in front of 66,540 fans at Wembley.

=== Sydney Roosters ===
In 1996, he joined the Sydney City Roosters where he played nine seasons, captaining them to the 2002 NRL Grand Final victory. Fittler retired as the second most experienced first grader, behind Terry Lamb (349), having played 336 games.

The Rothmans Medal for player of the 1997 ARL Premiership was awarded to Sydney City Roosters captain and five-eighth, Fittler.

He was selected for Kangaroo Tours in 1990, 1994 and 2001 and played in the World Cups of 1992, 1995 and 2000. Fittler was selected for the Australian team to compete in the end of season 1999 Rugby League Tri-Nations tournament. In the final against New Zealand he captained the Kangaroos at lock forward in their 22–20 victory. Early in his career Fittler struggled with discipline problems, but he matured into a fine leader. He captained Australia in 20 Tests, winning 17 and losing 3, and in a further 5 victories in the 2000 World Cup. He also captained NSW in 14 State of Origin matches, winning 8 and losing 6.

In club competition, Fittler captained the Sydney Roosters to the 2000 NRL Grand Final, their first in twenty seasons, a Premiership in 2002 and successive grand final appearances in 2003 and 2004, before retiring at the end of 2004. Having won the 2002 NRL Premiership, the Roosters traveled to England to play the 2003 World Club Challenge against Super League champions, St Helens R.F.C. Fittler captained at five-eighth, scoring a try in Sydney's victory.

Two years after Fittler announced his retirement from representative football, NSW coach Phil Gould brought him back to State of Origin for the second and third game. Both he and Gould were farewelled in the last game at Telstra Stadium after he scored the winning try that sealed the NSW victory.

Fittler remains the youngest NSW State of Origin player (18 years 114 days) and was once the youngest Kangaroo representative (18 years 247 days) until Israel Folau made his debut in late 2007.

As a tribute to Fittler's contribution to the NSW team, the Brad Fittler Medal is named in his honour, awarded to the best NSW player after each series victory by NSW.

=== Auckland Nines ===
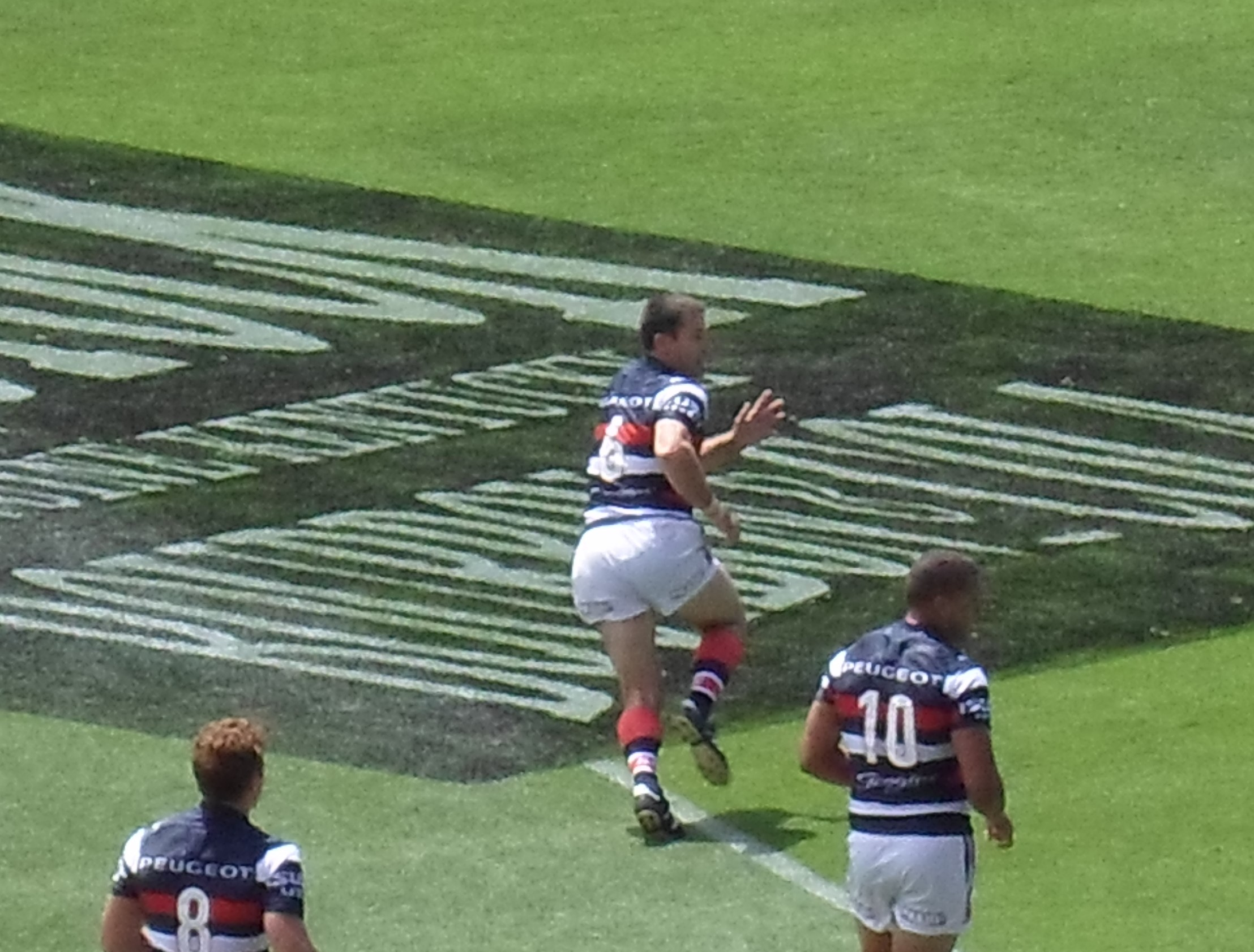
Brad Fittler playing in the NRL Nines 2014

In February 2014, at 42 years of age, Fittler came out of retirement for a one-off showing at the NRL Auckland Nines. Representing the Sydney Roosters, he made a tackle on prop forward Fui Fui Moi Moi in the loss to the Parramatta Eels, before clipping Ben Barba high in a tackle, and also scoring a 75-metre intercept try off a David Stagg pass in their win over the Brisbane Broncos, his first try in 10 years.

== Coaching career ==
On 9 July 2007, Roosters coach Chris Anderson quit the club, just 48 hours after the team lost 56–0 to the Manly-Warringah Sea Eagles, their second worst ever loss. Fittler took over the coaching from Round 18, in what was initially for a short term until the end of the 2007 season. The Roosters, who were sitting near the bottom of the competition and struggling with form, turned a corner with Fittler as coach as they went on to post some impressive wins. His first match was against his former mentor, Ricky Stuart coaching the Cronulla-Sutherland Sharks. The Roosters won the match 23–12. His second match was against the Newcastle Knights and again the team was successful 20–17.

On 27 July 2007, Fittler's coaching career took a massive leap. The Roosters defeated the Melbourne Storm (front runners of the Premiership) 26–16, with the Storm scoring two late consolation tries. Former Roosters coach, Phil Gould remarked after the Melbourne game "I've always had great confidence that "Freddie" would be successful at anything he turned his mind to. If he truly wants to be a coach, he'll be a bloody good one... I think in the end he was drawn to it and, to me, that's a coach. You don't wake up one day and say, 'I want to be a coach'. You are drawn to it. It compels you. I see and hear this in Freddie these days." Melbourne ultimately went on to win the title, which was later stripped due to salary cap breaches.

Following the win over the Storm, the Roosters went up against the New Zealand Warriors, with the match resulting in the first draw since 2005 after a hard-fought golden point period which ended with the score 31–31, keeping Fittler undefeated as coach.

That run was extended against the Wests Tigers on 10 August, with the second golden point game in a row for the club after a late field goal attempt from Braith Anasta hit the crossbar with 15 seconds to go. The game ended in a 26–22 win after Joel Monaghan scored the winning try.

Fittler's undefeated streak as a coach was broken on 19 August 2007 when the Roosters lost 22–18 to the Gold Coast Titans. The following week, in the penultimate round of the regular season, the Roosters lost to the eventual 2007 wooden spooners, the Penrith Panthers, 28–22.

On 21 August 2007, the Sydney Roosters signed Brad Fittler as their full-time Head Coach until the 2010 season.

On 20 June 2009, it was reported in the Townsville Bulletin that, a day earlier, a drunken Fittler had tried to gain access to the wrong hotel room while wearing only shorts. The incident occurred at the Holiday Inn in Townsville at 3am. Fittler consequently fined himself A$10,000 and apologised for his behaviour at a televised press conference.

On 18 July 2009, following an ongoing season of unrelenting disappointment at the Roosters, the media was informed that in 2010 Brad Fittler would not be part of the coaching staff at the Sydney Roosters, reportedly before he was. Indeed, the Roosters took out the 2009 wooden spoon and a clean-out of the club began. He was replaced by Brian Smith.

On 24 November 2017, Fittler was announced as the new coach of the New South Wales rugby league team as the replacement for Laurie Daley. and announced a significant change to the Game 1 roster compared to the previous series with the debut of 11 players for the match on 6 June 2018. He ultimately led the side to its first series win since 2014 with an 18–14 victory in the second game. He was again successful the following year as the Blues won consecutive series for the first time since 2004–05.

On 24 June 2020, Fittler had his contract as New South Wales coach extended until the 2021 State of Origin series.

In the 2020 State of Origin series, Fittler coached a highly fancied New South Wales side to a 2–1 defeat against Queensland. Before the series began, some NSW media outlets described the 2020 Queensland team as the worst ever Maroons side in history. In the 2021 State of Origin series, New South Wales bounced back under Fittler to win the series 2-1. New South Wales won the first game 50-6 followed by a 26-0 victory in game 2. Under Fittler, New South Wales would lose the 2022 State of Origin series after game 3 went to a decider in Brisbane which New South Wales lost 22-12. Before the start of the 2023 State of Origin series, Fittler was criticised by the media and fans alike for his team selections before game 1 which included not selecting the in-form Campbell Graham and Dylan Edwards, instead electing to pick the out of form James Tedesco and Tom Trbojevic along with the selection of Tevita Pangai Junior. New South Wales would go on to lose the opening game after leading towards the end of the match. Before game 2, Fittler caused more controversy for his selections including leaving Nicholas Hynes out of the team altogether, instead he elected to pick Mitchell Moses as the replacement for the injury Nathan Cleary. New South Wales would lose game 2 32-6 which gave Queensland the series victory. NSW bounced back to win the dead rubber 24-10. On 28 September 2023, Fittler stepped down from his role as New South Wales head coach. It was reported that NSWRL Chairman Paul Conlon and his board offered Fittler a contract extension but he declined the offer.

Brad Fittler – NRL Coaching Results by Season
NRL Team	Year	Games	Wins	Losses	Draws	Win %
Sydney Roosters	2007	8	5	2	1	63%
Sydney Roosters	2008	26	15	11	0	58%
Sydney Roosters	2009	24	5	19	0	21%
Career		58	25	32	1	43%

== Media career ==
Fittler began his media career by co-hosting NRL Deluxe, a streaming video show that aired on Mondays and Thursdays available via Bigpond TV. A year after his retirement, in 2005, Fittler released his book, Freddy: The Brad Fittler Story. Brad has also starred in two Telstra Next G TV advertisements.

In 2010, Fittler joined the Nine Network. In 2010 and 2011, he was a part of The NRL Footy Show, as a co-host. Also, since 2010, he has co-hosted The Sunday Footy Show program. In 2016, he has a role in The NRL Rookie.

== Outside rugby league ==
In 2000, Fittler was awarded the Australian Sports Medal for his contribution to Australia's international standing in rugby league.

In February 2008, Fittler was named in the list of Australia's 100 Greatest Players (1908–2007) which was commissioned by the NRL and ARL to celebrate the code's centenary year in Australia.

Fittler has a longtime partner, Marie Liarris. They have two children.

He also fathered an illegitimate son after a one-night stand in 1995. He has never met the child and only pays child support, deliberately having chosen not to see the boy since 1996.

In an article published written by Sandra Lee in The Sunday Telegraph in 2005, Fittler stated that "I just hope that he lives in a stable environment, that's all I can hope for. I was young ... I just dealt with it as best I could. You don't (come) equipped with those sorts of skills. I suppose I did what I thought was best for me at the time. I just made sure I covered all legal angles, what my commitments were. I was in no state at the time. I didn't think I was up to raising kids. I was 23. I would have asked her to think about it maybe from my point of view. Whether that most probably would have been a selfish point of view ... it's just hard when you're never asked, never confronted. I understand it could be hard on the boy, but the mother has to shoulder much of the blame for the way she went about things." In his autobiography, Freddy, The Brad Fittler Story, Fittler says he believes that a financial contribution to raising his boy, who is now nine, is sufficient.

In 2022, inducted into Sport Australia Hall of Fame. In 2025, he was an inaugural inductee of the Stadium Australia Hall of Fame.

In March 2025, he was appointed as one of Touch Football Australia Board Members in the new leadership appointments.

== Controversies ==
In 1999, Fittler was dropped onto the front lawn of a Sydney police station by a taxi driver after a night out. A police source described Fittler as "the drunkest human being ever".

In 2009, Fittler fined himself $10,000 after police were called to Townsville's Holiday Inn after two female guests reported a "creepy man" with a "hairy chest" – wearing only shorts – trying to get into their room. Police arrived at 3.15am to find a "very drunk" Fittler still outside the room.

Sporting positions
Preceded by Laurie Daley	Captain Australia; 1995–2001	Succeeded by Paul Harragon
