= Blacktown Workers =

Australian rugby league club, based in Blacktown, NSW

Blacktown Workers Rugby League
Club information
- Full name: Blacktown Workers Rugby League Football Club
- Nickname: Workers
- Colours: White; Black; Red
- Founded: 1962; 64 years ago

Current details
- Ground: H.E. Laybutt Sports Complex
- Coach: Ronny Palumbo
- Captain: Tangi Hokai
- Competition: NSW Cup

Records
- Runners-up: 1 Third Tier (1970)
- Minor premierships: 1 Fourth Tier (2013 (SS))
- Wooden spoons: 4 Third Tier (1967, 1975, 2019, 2022)

The Blacktown Workers Rugby League Football Club, formerly known as Blacktown Workers Sea Eagles, are an Australian rugby league football club based in Blacktown, New South Wales formed in 1962. From 2017 until 2024, they had a side in the NSW Cup, as the feeder team to the Manly Warringah Sea Eagles. However, this partnership ended after Blacktown Workers and Manly decided to mutually end the partnership and Manly reverted back their NSW Cup team to play under the banner of Manly Warringah Sea Eagles.

== Knock-on Effect NSW Cup ==
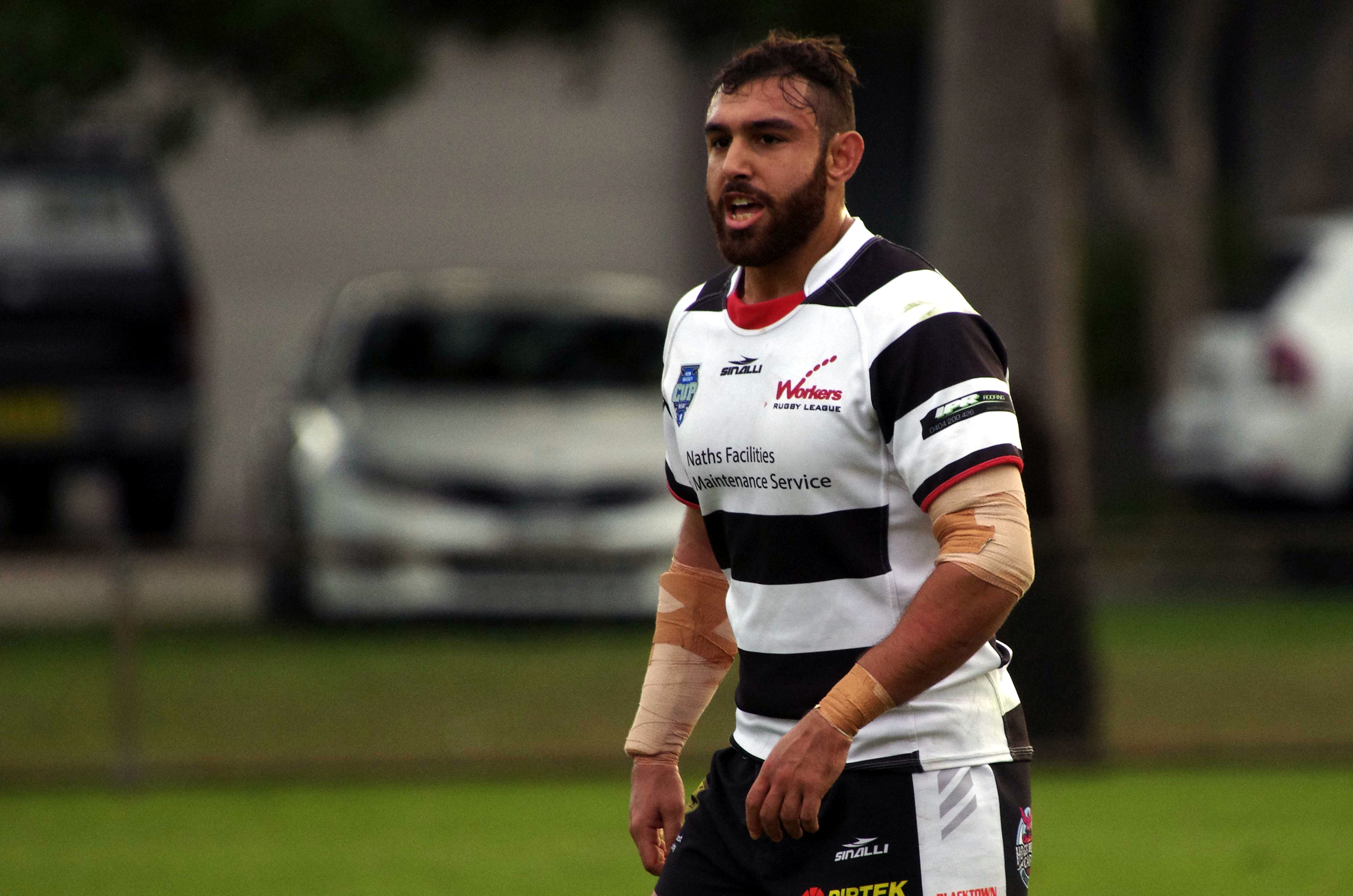
Jad Mahmoud playing for the Workers

The Blacktown Workers first season in The Intrust Super Premiership NSW as the Sea Eagles, was a disappointing one as they finished the season in 10th place and missed out on the finals series.

In 2018, the Blacktown Workers missed out on the finals for a second consecutive season after finishing 9th on the table. At the end of the 2019 Canterbury Cup NSW season, the Blacktown Workers Sea Eagles endured a tough season finishing last on the table and claiming the wooden spoon with just six wins all year. The Ron Massey Cup side also had a tough season finishing 9th on the table and missing out on the finals. In the 2022 NSW Cup season, Blacktown Workers finished last on the table and claimed the wooden spoon after winning only two matches for the entire year. The 2022 Ron Massey Cup side also had a poor year finishing second last on the table. The 2023 season proved Blacktown's most successful to date after the regular season finishing in fifth position and making it to the finals. The 2024 season, their final season as the Sea Eagles, saw the team miss out on the finals again, finishing in ninth position.

Year	Competition	Ladder			Finals Position	All Match Record						
Year	Competition	Pos	Byes	Pts	Finals Position	P	W	L	D	For	Agst	Diff
2017	Intrust Super NSW Premiership	10	3	22		22	8	14	0	466	606	-140
2018	Intrust Super NSW Premiership	9	2	22		22	8	12	2	476	496	-20
2019	Canterbury Cup	12	1	15		22	6	15	1	460	615	-155
2020	Canterbury Cup	N/A	0	0	Competition Cancelled	1	0	1	0	30	44	-14
2021	Knock on Effect NSW Cup	10	4	22		16	4	8	4	290	718	-114
2022	Knock on Effect NSW Cup	12	2	8		22	2	20	0	254	368	-428
2023	Knock on Effect NSW Cup	5	2	32		24	13	9	2	659	524	105
2024	Knock on Effect NSW Cup	9	2	24		24	10	14	0	566	704	-138

== Notable Juniors ==
- John Klein (1974–76 Penrith Panthers)
- Gary Allsop (1975–78 Penrith Panthers)
- Wayne Moore (1972–75) Penrith Panthers however graded in 1973 from Blacktown Leagues
- Peter Newsome (1975–77 Penrith Panthers) however graded in 1973 from Blacktown Leagues
- Brad Izzard (1982–92 Penrith Panthers)
- Craig Izzard (1983–93 Penrith Panthers, Parramatta Eels, Balmain Tigers & Illawarra Steelers)
- Robbie Robards (1985–88 Penrith Panthers)
- Grant Izzard (1990–93 Penrith Panthers & Illawarra Steelers)
- Ben Galea (1999–13 Balmain Tigers, Wests Tigers, Hull Kingston Rovers & Hull F.C.)
- Geoff Daniela (2007–2013 Penrith Panthers & Wests Tigers)
- Brian To'o (2019– Penrith Panthers)

== Honours ==
- Sydney Shield Minor Premiers:

2013

== Ron Massey Cup ==
Blacktown competed in the NSWRL Second Division and Metropolitan Cup in the late 1960s and early 1970s. Blacktown Workers entered the competition now known as the Ron Massey Cup in 2012.
The win–loss–draw record in the table below includes Finals Series matches.

Year	Competition	Ladder			Finals Position	All Match Record						
Year	Competition	Pos	Byes	Pts	Finals Position	P	W	L	D	For	Agst	Diff
1967	Second Division	8	0	2	Wooden Spoon	14	1	13	0	112	329	-217
1968	Second Division	7	2	10		16	5	11	0	140	321	-181
1969	Second Division	2	0	26	Finalist	18	13	5	0	346	193	153
1970	Second Division	2	2	30	Grand Finalist	22	16	6	0	373	208	165
1971	Second Division	10	2	9		20	4	15	1	250	601	-351
1972	Second Division	9	2	16		20	6	14	0	261	528	-267
1973	Second Division	10	2	11		18	3	14	1	282	484	-202
1974	Metropolitan Cup	4		25	Semi-Finalist	22	12	9	1	305	282	23
1975	Metropolitan Cup	9	2	4	Wooden Spoon	16	2	14	0	209	449	-240
2012	Bundaberg Red Cup	9	0	5		18	2	15	1	372	904	-532
2013	Ron Massey Cup	10	0	16		22	8	14	0	576	824	-248
2014	Ron Massey Cup	10	0	16		22	8	14	0	501	713	-212
2015	Ron Massey Cup	7	2	22	Last 6 Semi-Finalist	22	10	12	0	622	499	123
2016	Ron Massey Cup	10	2	20		20	8	12	0	503	496	7
2017	Ron Massey Cup	8	7	28	Top 8 Elimination Semi-Finalist	19	7	12	0	408	648	-240
2018	Ron Massey Cup	8	2	20	Last 6 Semi-Finalist	20	9	11	0	457	551	-94
2019	Ron Massey Cup	9	1	16		20	6	14	0	362	606	-244
2020	Ron Massey Cup	N/A	0	0		1	0	1	0	4	30	-26

== Sydney Shield ==
Year	Competition	Ladder			Finals Position	All Match Record						
Year	Competition	Pos	Byes	Pts	Finals Position	P	W	L	D	For	Agst	Diff
2014	Sydney Shield	10	0	13		22	6	15	1	410	790	-380
2015	Sydney Shield	9	2	19		20	7	12	1	554	573	-19
2016	Sydney Shield	13	0	12		22	6	16	0	525	730	-205
2017	Sydney Shield	9	3	18		22	6	15	0	538	806	-268
2018	Sydney Shield	8	2	16	Top 8 Elimination Semi-Finalist	19	6	13	0	454	610	-156

== See also ==
- National Rugby League reserves affiliations
- List of rugby league clubs in Australia
- Rugby league in New South Wales

== Sources ==
Years	Acronym	Item	Available Online	Via
1920 to 1973	RLN	Rugby League News	Yes	Trove
1972–76, 78, 80–81, 1991-96, 1998-2009	-	New South Wales Rugby League Annual Report	No	State Library of NSW
2014-19	-	New South Wales Rugby League Annual Report	Yes	NSWRL website
2003 to 2014	RLW	Rugby League Week	Yes	eResources at State Library of NSW
1974 to 2019	BL	Big League	No	State Library of NSW
2014 to now	LU	League Unlimited	Yes	League Unlimited website
2010 to 2019	-	Various Newspaper Websites	Yes	As referenced
