= 1991 NSWRL season =

Rugby league competition

1991 New South Wales Rugby League
- Teams: 16
- Premiers: Penrith (1st title)
- Minor premiers: Penrith (1st title)
- Matches played: 183
- Points scored: 6376
- Average attendance: 13,187
- Total attendance: 2,413,218
- Top points scorer: Daryl Halligan (196)
- Wooden spoon: Gold Coast; Seagulls (1st spoon)
- Rothmans Medal: Ewan McGrady
- Top try-scorer: Alan McIndoe (19)

The 1991 NSWRL season was the eighty-fourth season of professional rugby league football in Australia. This year the New South Wales Rugby League experimented with a draft system for the first time. Sixteen clubs competed for the J J Giltinan Shield and Winfield Cup premiership during the season, which culminated in a replay of the previous year's grand final between the Canberra Raiders and the Penrith Panthers.

== Season summary ==
The 1991 New South Wales Rugby League season started with controversy. For the first time a draft system which had been developed was put into operation. The draft allowed teams to recruit players on a roster system based on where the club finished the previous year. It ran in reverse order with the wooden spooners getting first choice and the premiers last. The draft lasted just the one season before being defeated in the courts by players and coaches opposed to its limitations. The controversy started after Terry Hill, who had agreed to join the Warren Ryan coached Western Suburbs, was drafted to play for Eastern Suburbs. Hill appealed his drafting, though his appeal was initially overturned and he eventually agreed to a three-year contract with the Roosters. However, by the end of 1991 the High Court had overturned the draft system and in 1992 Hill was given a release and he was able to move on to Wests.

In 22 rounds of regular season football which lasted from March till August, eventual premiers Penrith won 17 games, drew one and lost only four. The Panthers finished on 35 premiership points and took their first minor premiership ahead of Manly and Norths (both 29 points), Canberra on 28 with Wests sneaking in on 27 points after beating Canterbury 19–14 in a play off.

On 24 July it was revealed that the Canberra Raiders had substantially breached their $1.5 million salary cap for 1991.

The record for attendance at a match at Campbelltown Stadium was set this season with a crowd figure of 21,527 for a game between Western Suburbs and St. George. Also this season the NSWRL took a match between St. George and Balmain to the Adelaide Oval and it was met with success as 28,884 spectators (the highest non-finals attendance of the season) turned out for the game on a cold and wet Friday night in June. The game was taken to Adelaide not only for the NSWRL to expand into traditional Australian Rules Football strongholds, but also as the Dragons long time major sponsor Penfolds is an Adelaide-based company.

The 1991 season's Rothmans Medal was awarded to Canterbury-Bankstown's Ewan McGrady, who was also named as Rugby League Week's player of the year. The Dally M Award was won by St. George's Michael Potter, the first fullback to do so.

=== Teams ===
The number of teams competing remained unchanged for the third consecutive year, with sixteen clubs contesting the premiership, including five inner Sydney-based foundation teams, another six from greater Sydney, two from greater New South Wales, two from Queensland, and one from the Australian Capital Territory.

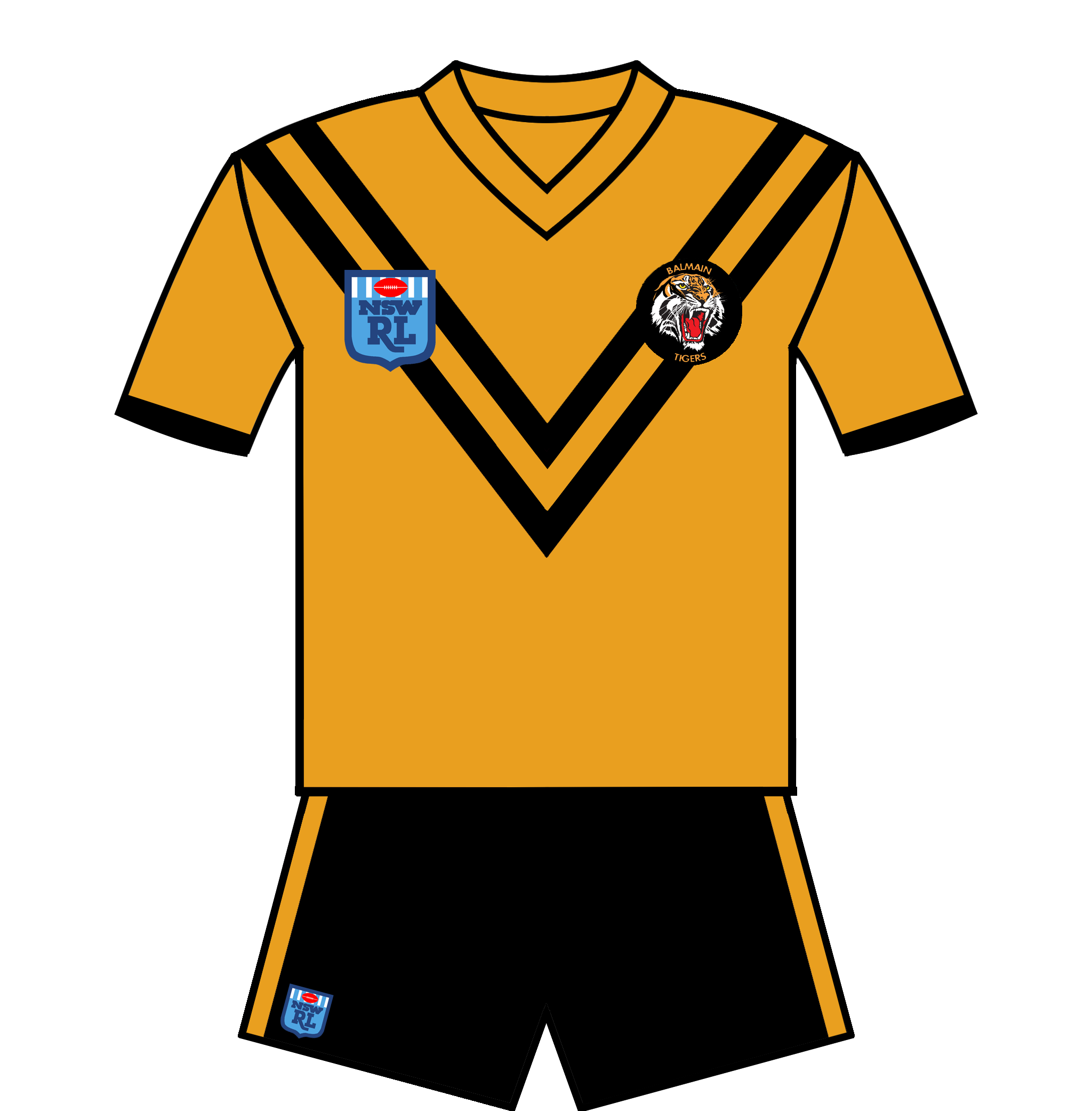
Balmain; Tigers 84th season Ground: Leichhardt Oval; Coach: Alan Jones; Captain: Ben Elias

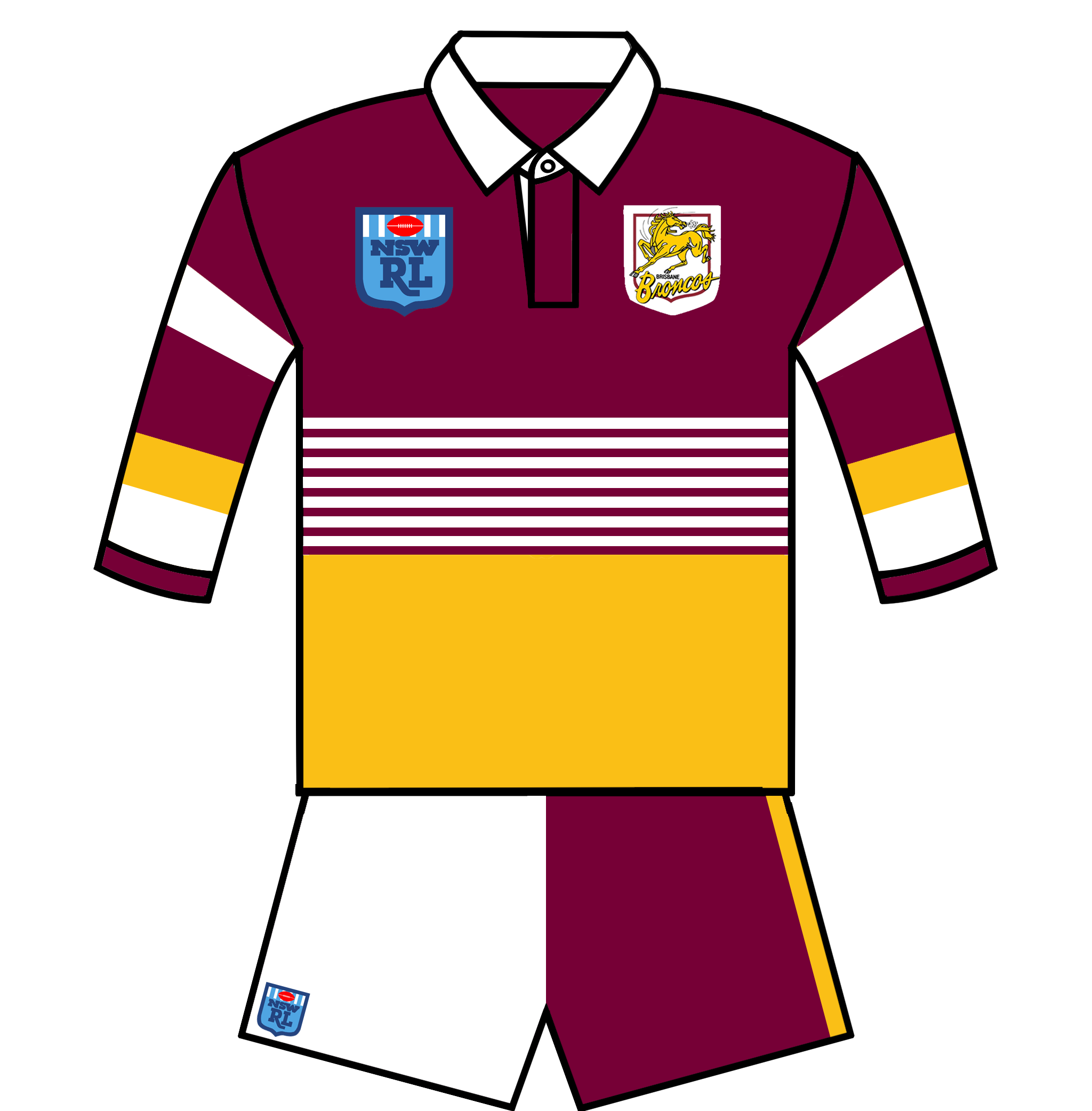
Brisbane; Broncos 4th season Ground: Lang Park; Coach: Wayne Bennett; Captain: Gene Miles

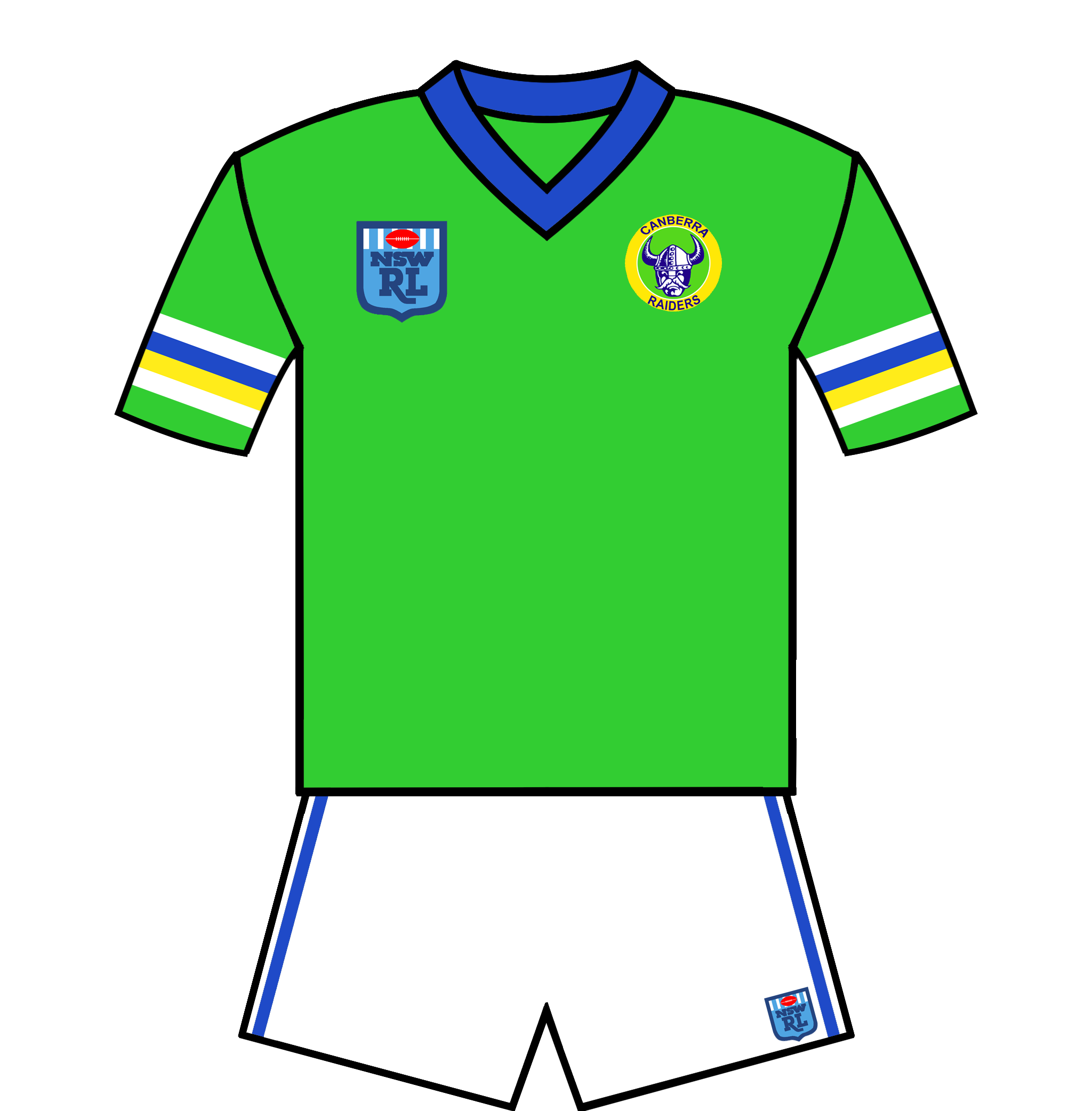
Canberra; Raiders 10th season Ground: Bruce Stadium; Coach: Tim Sheens; Captain: Mal Meninga

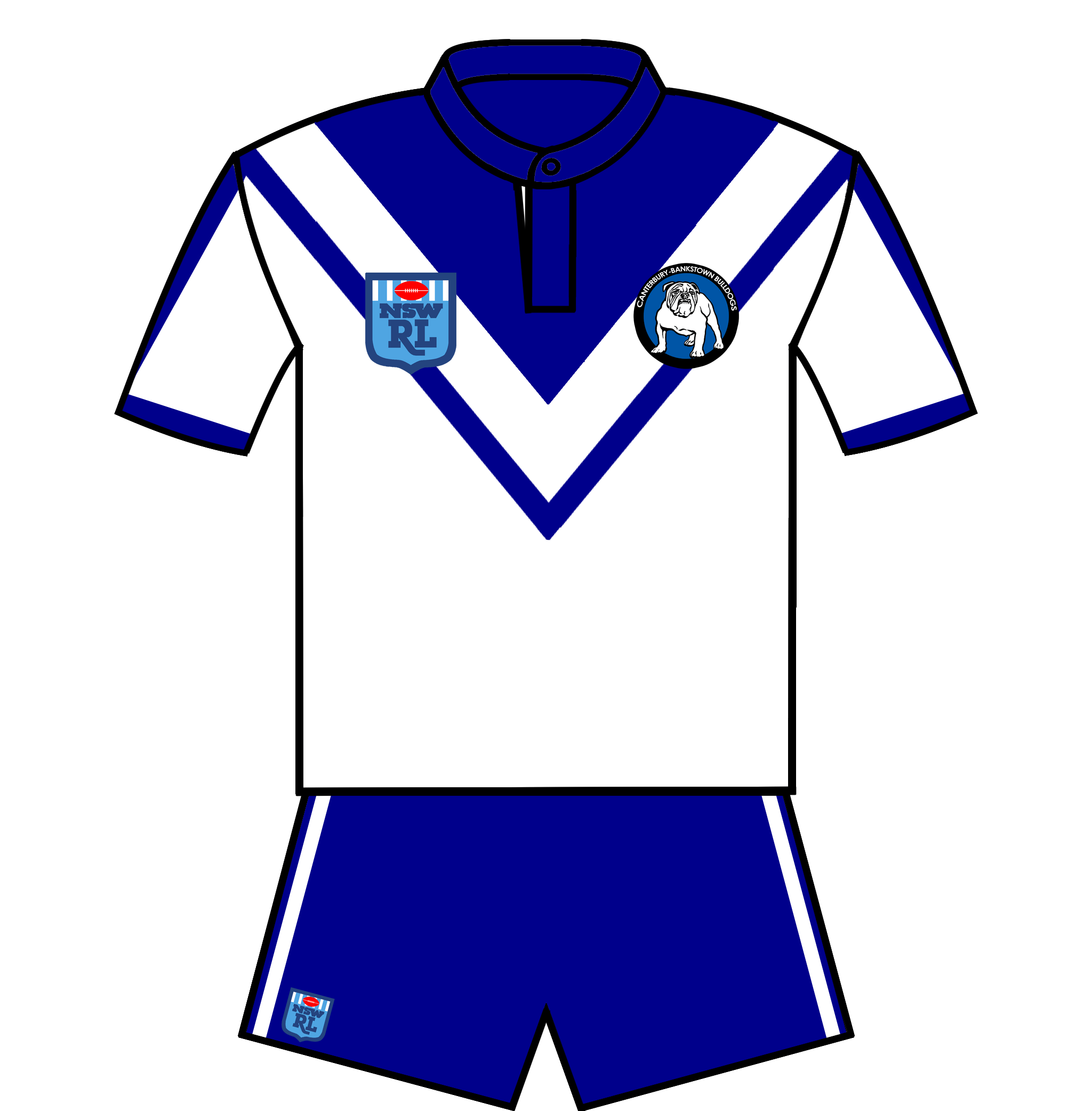
Canterbury-Bankstown; Bulldogs 57th season Ground: Belmore Oval; Coach: Chris Anderson; Captain: Terry Lamb

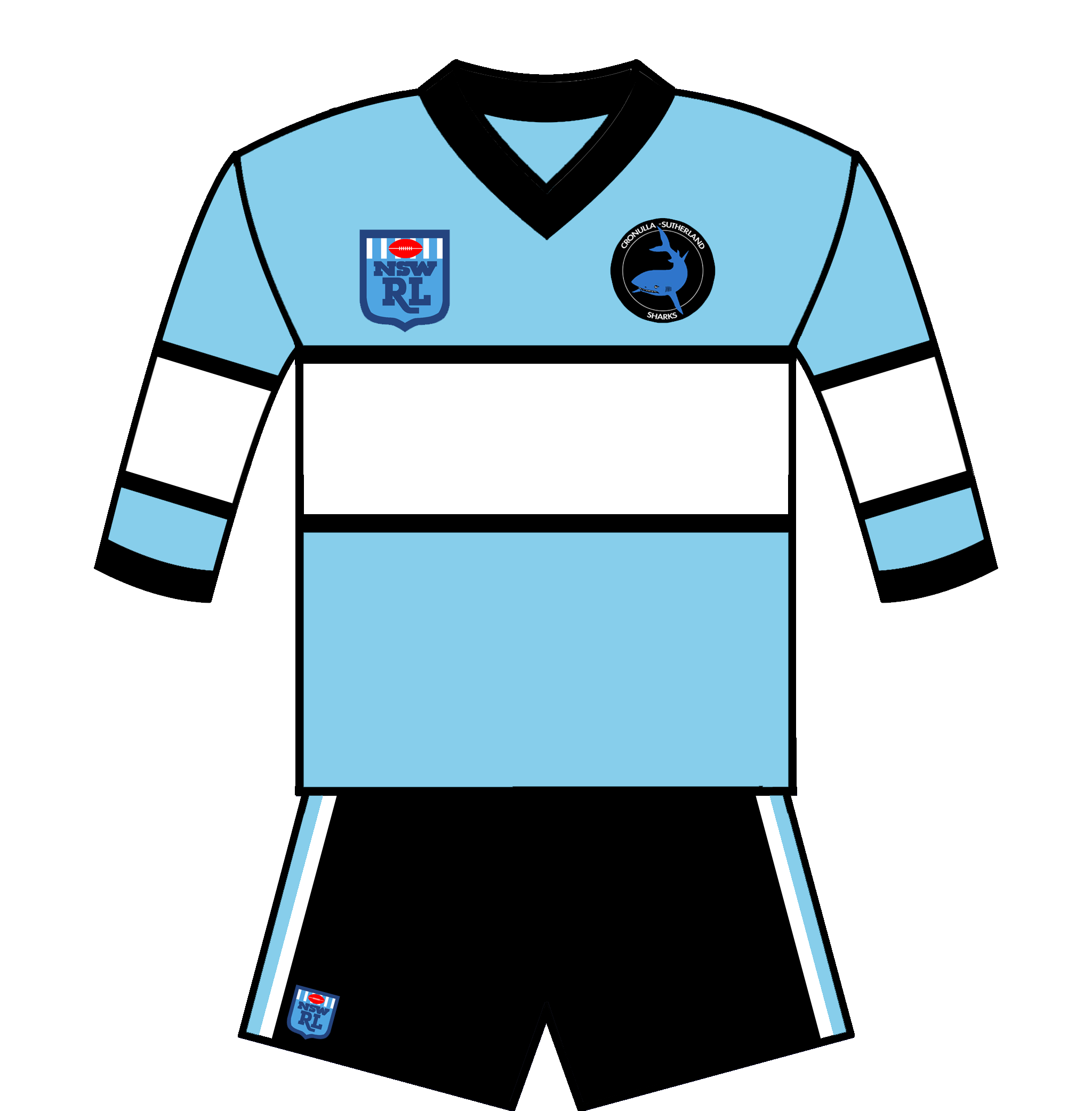
Cronulla-Sutherland; Sharks 25th season Ground: Endeavour Park; Coach: Allan Fitzgibbon; Captain: Gavin Miller

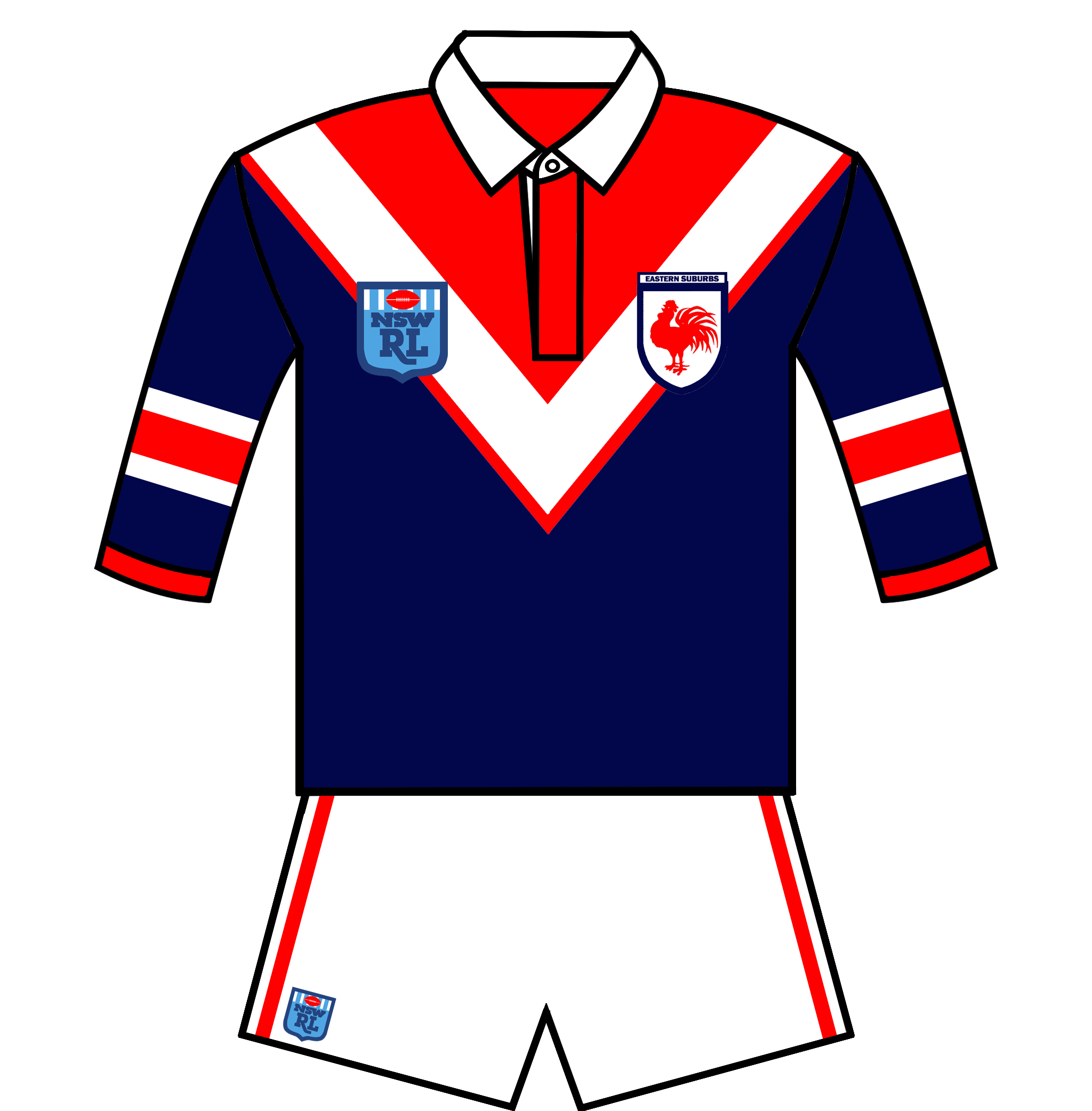
Eastern Suburbs; Roosters 84th season Ground: Sydney Football Stadium; Coach: Mark Murray; Captain: Hugh McGahan

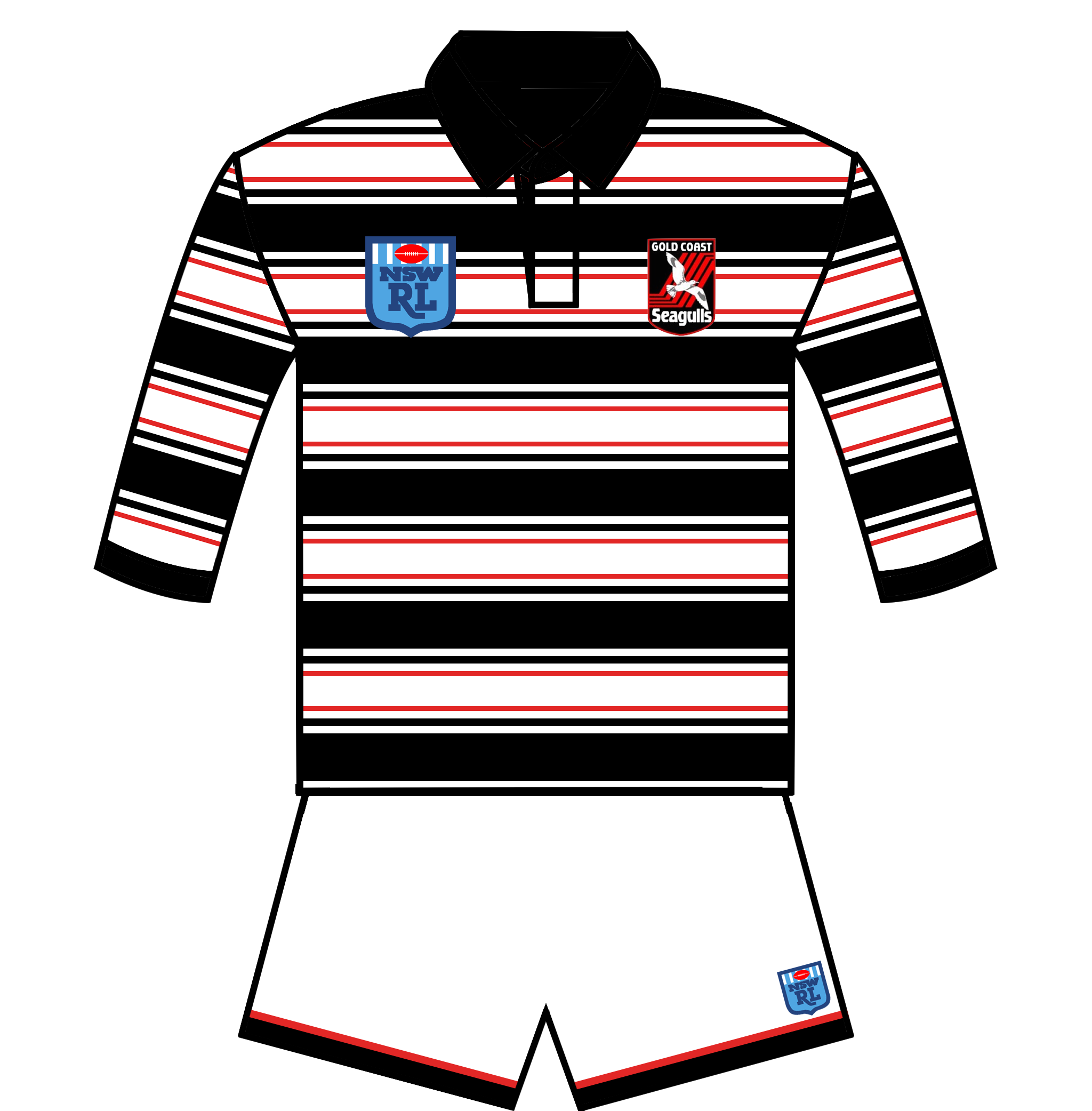
Gold Coast; Seagulls 4th season Ground: Seagulls Stadium; Coach: Malcolm Clift; Captain: Wally Lewis

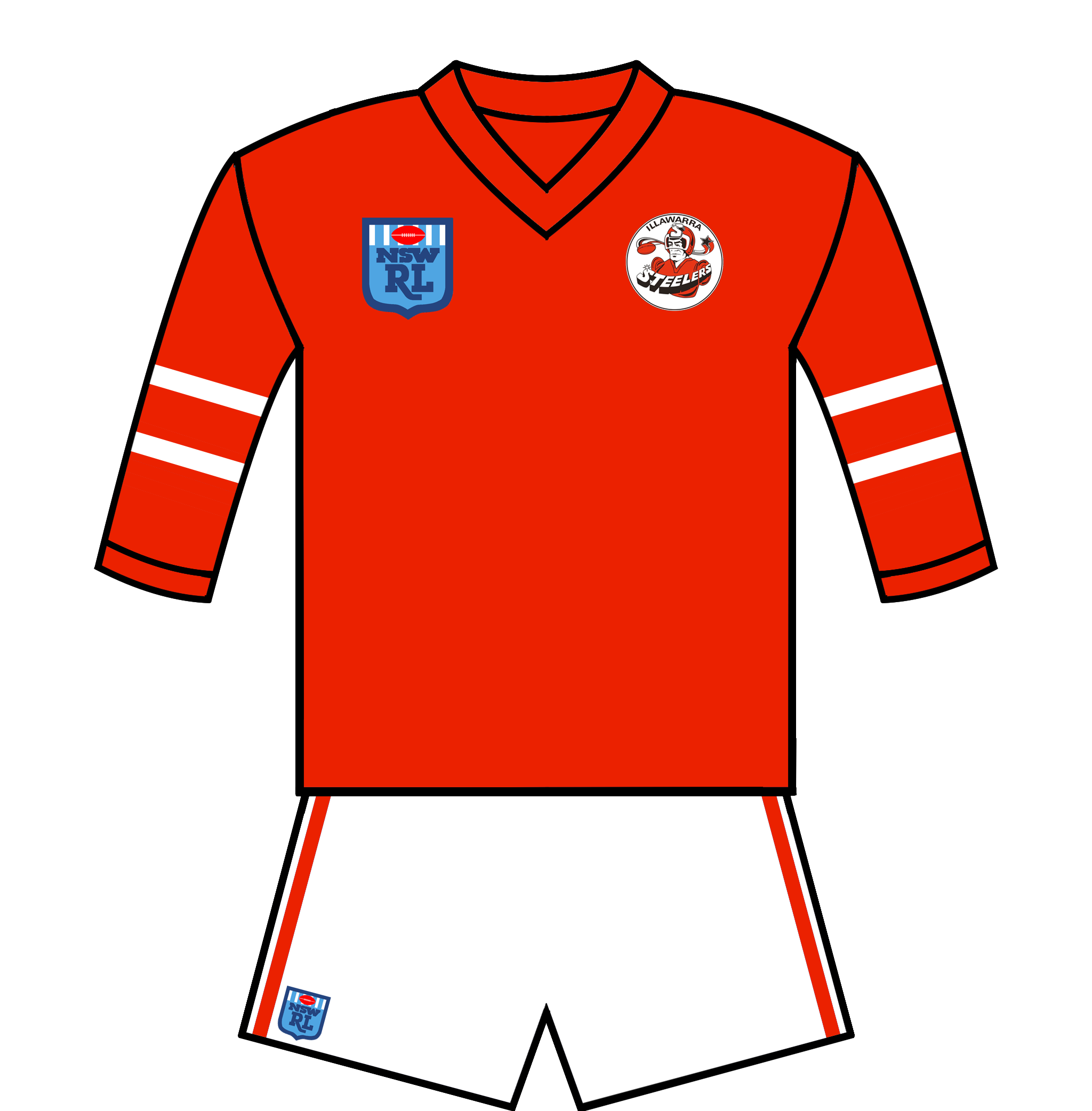
Illawarra; Steelers 10th season Ground: Wollongong Stadium; Coach: Graham Murray; Captain: Chris Walsh & Dean Schifilliti

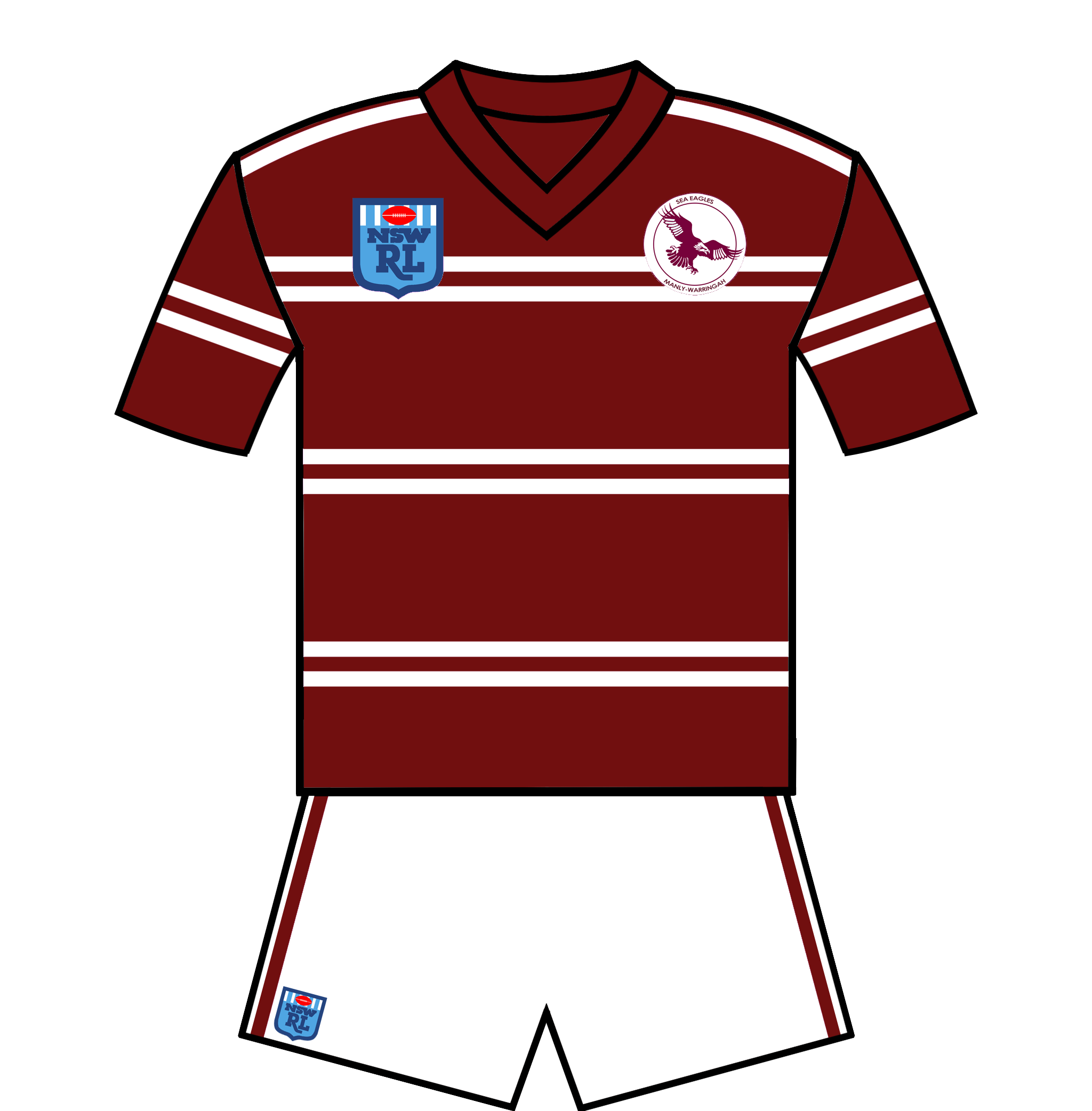
Manly-Warringah; Sea Eagles 45th season Ground: Brookvale Oval; Coach: Graham Lowe; Captain: Michael O'Connor

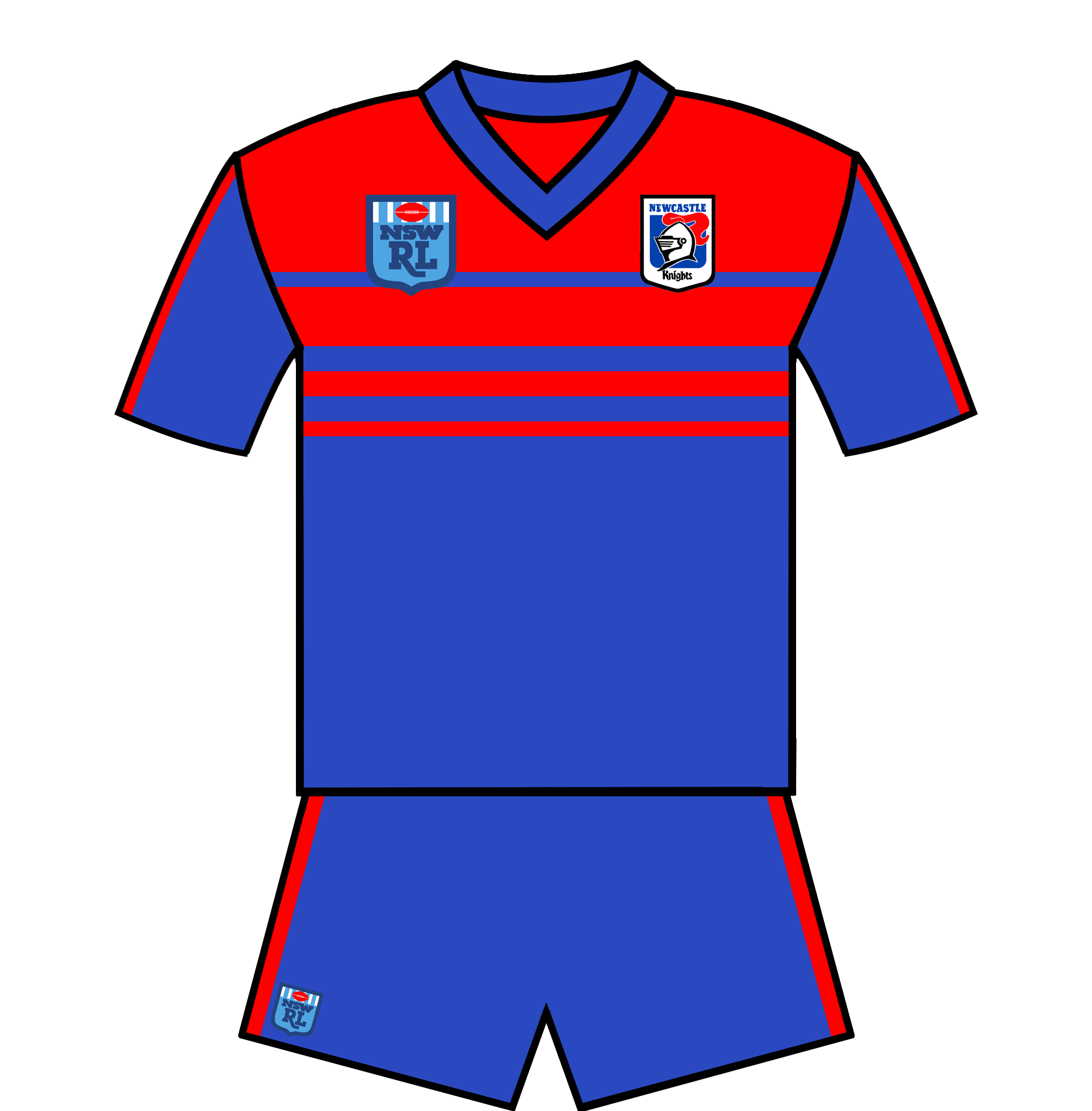
Newcastle; Knights 4th season Ground: Marathon Stadium; Coach: Allan McMahon → David Waite; Captain: Sam Stewart

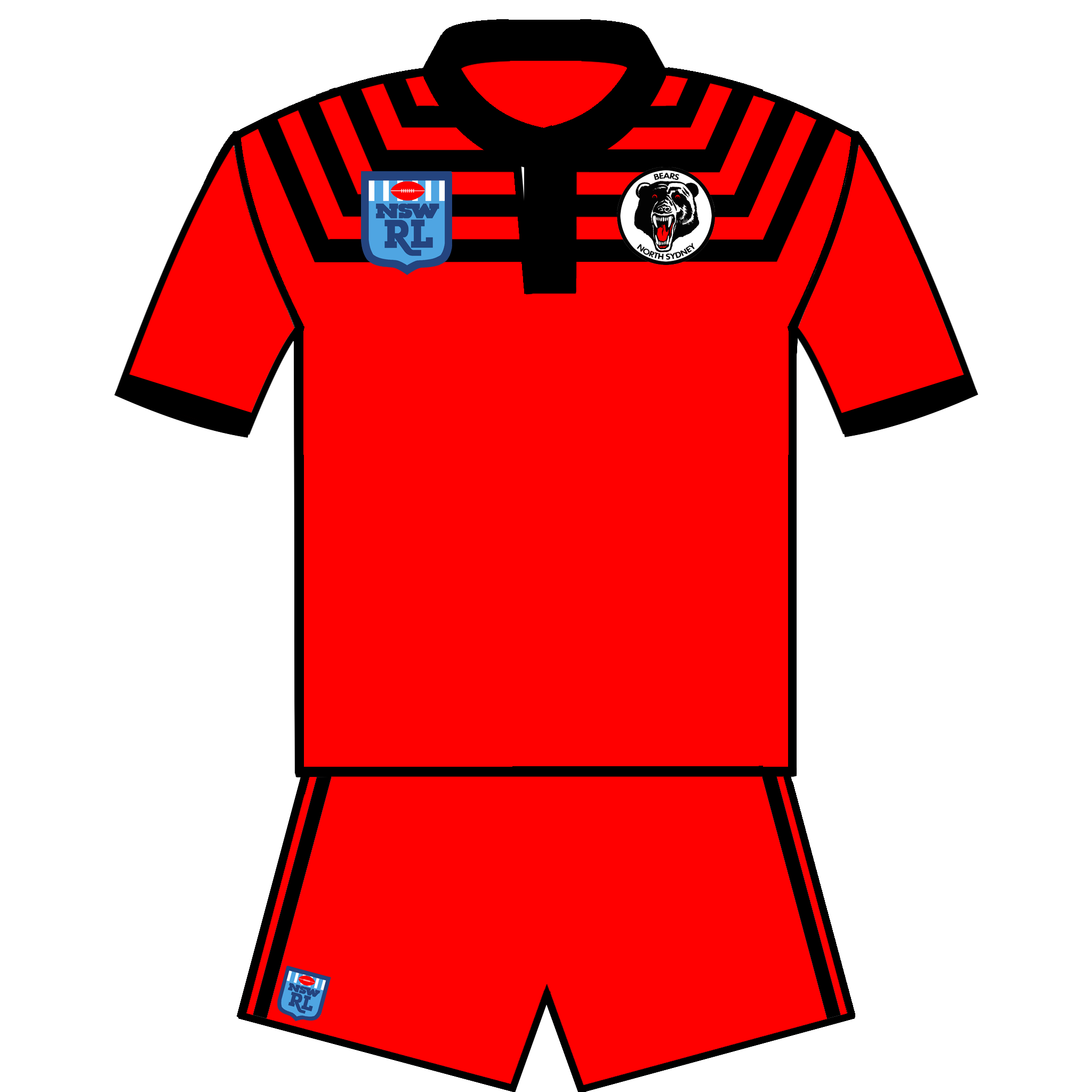
North Sydney; Bears 84th season Ground: North Sydney Oval; Coach: Steve Martin; Captain: Tony Rea

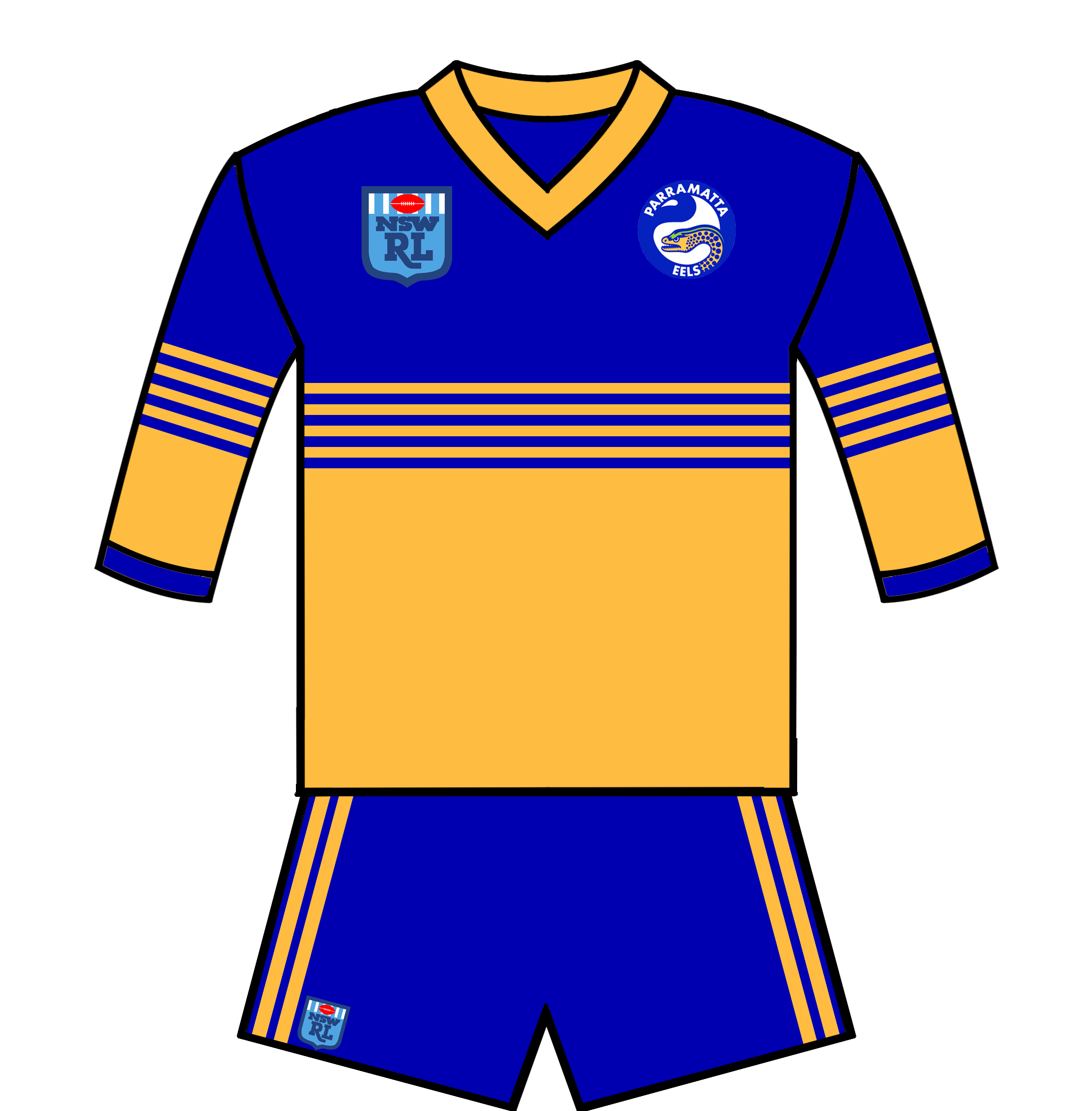
Parramatta; Eels 45th season Ground: Parramatta Stadium; Coach: Mick Cronin; Captain: Brett Kenny

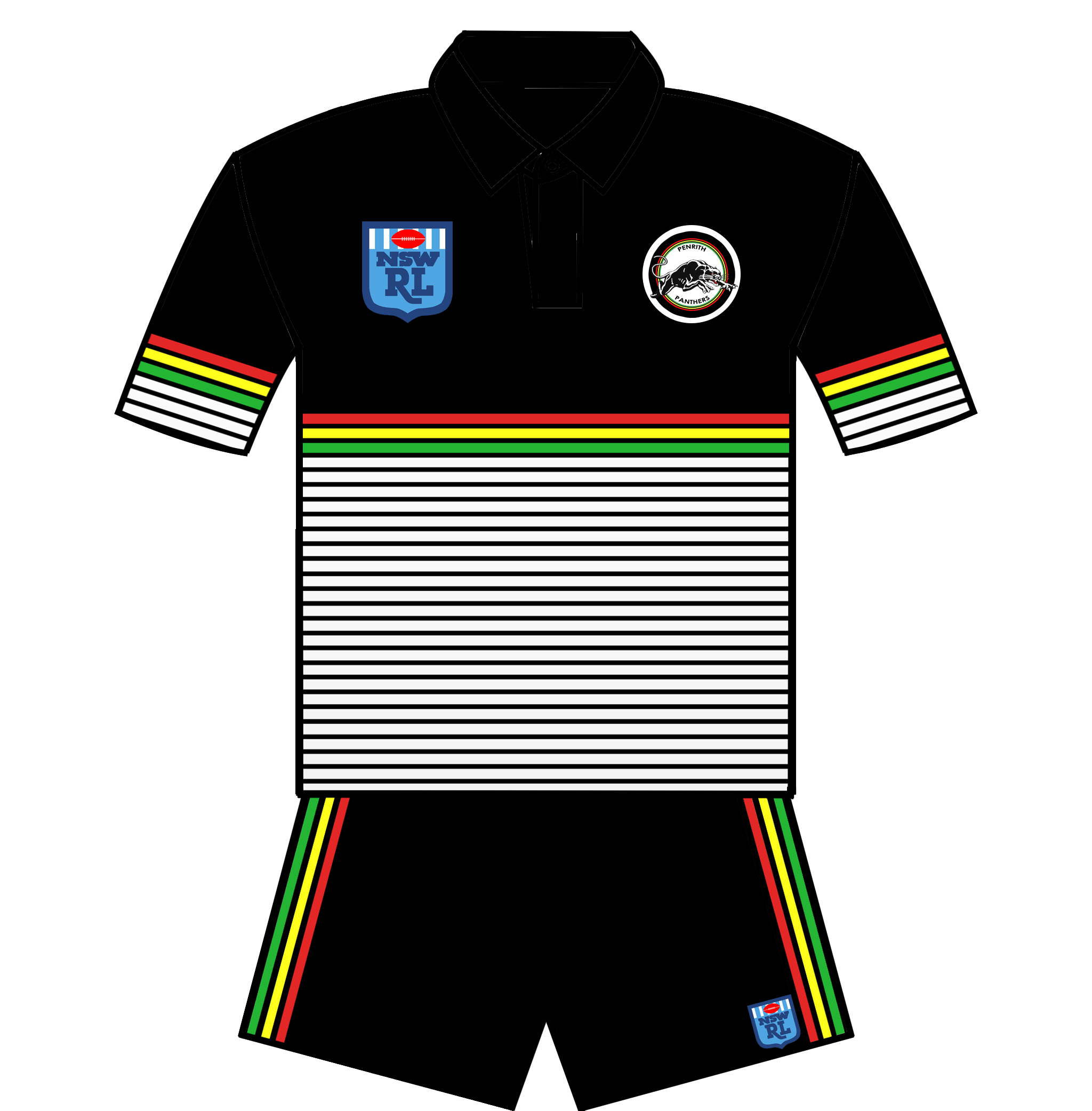
Penrith; Panthers 25th season Ground: Penrith Stadium; Coach: Phil Gould; Captain: Greg Alexander

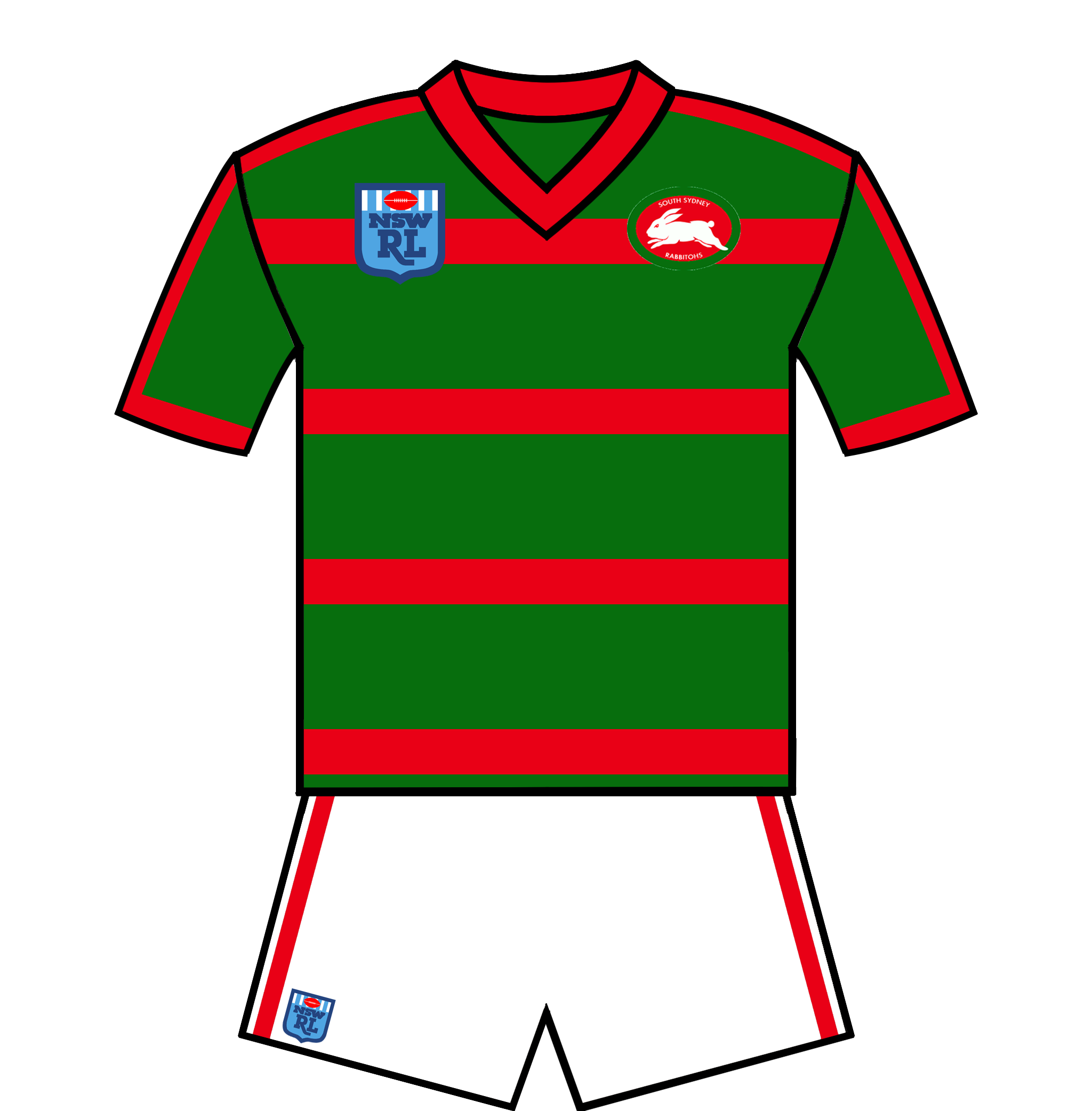
South Sydney; Rabbitohs 84th season Ground: Sydney Football Stadium; Coach: Frank Curry; Captain: Michael Andrews

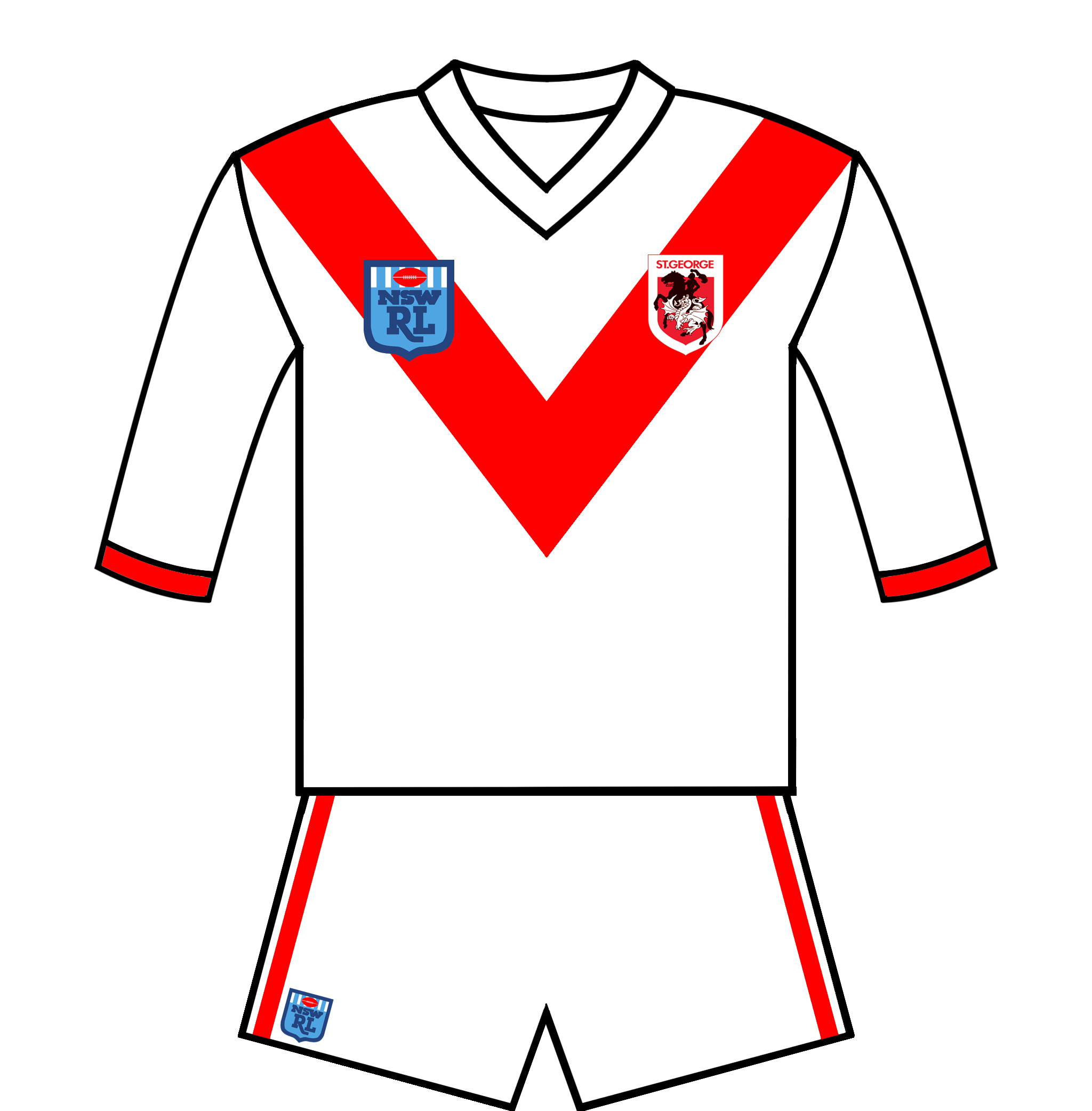
St. George; Dragons 71st season Ground: Kogarah Oval; Coach: Brian Smith; Captain: Michael Beattie

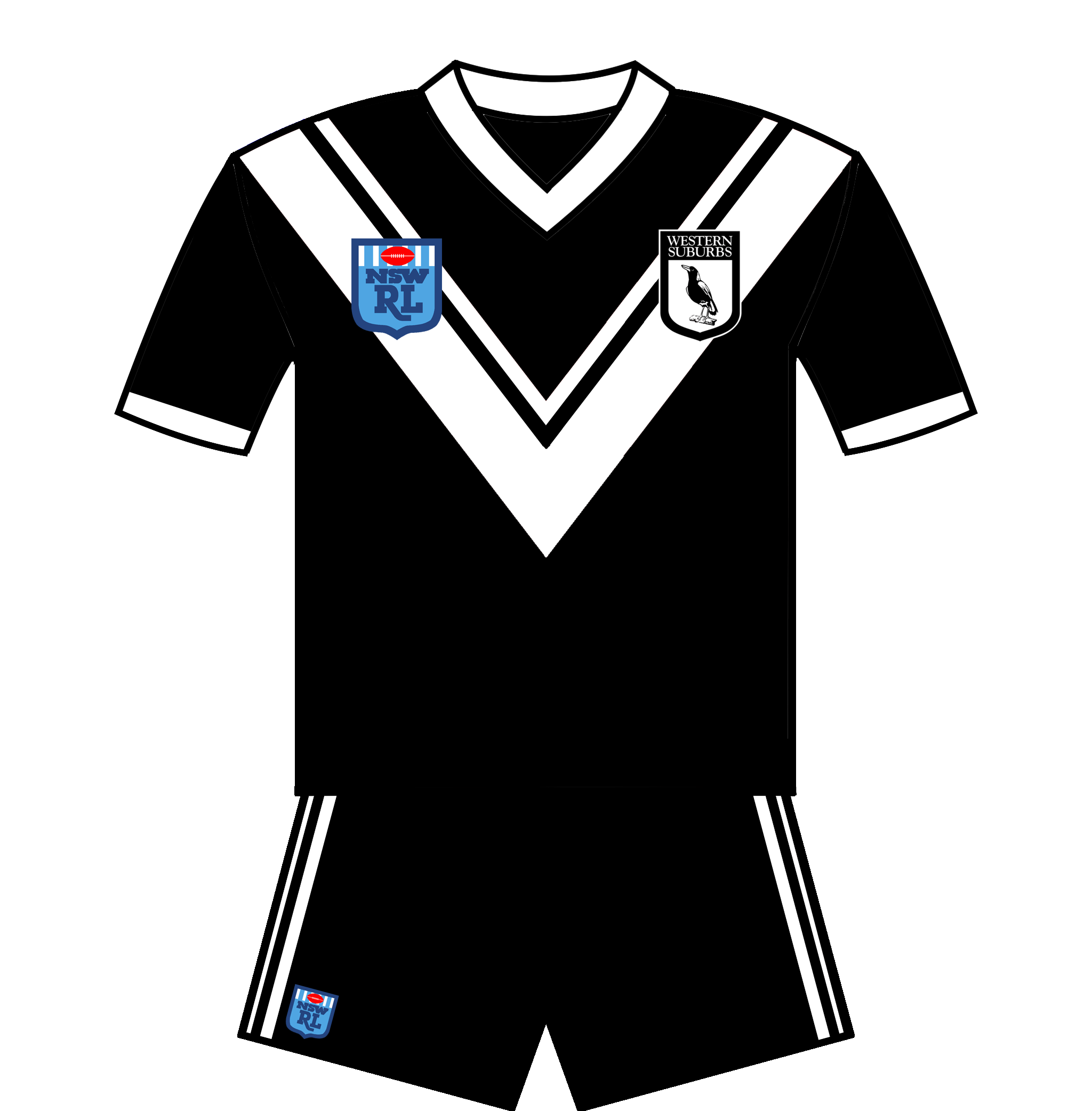
Western Suburbs; Magpies 84th season Ground: Campbelltown Sports Ground; Coach: Warren Ryan; Captain: Paul Langmack

=== Advertising ===
1991 again saw the NSWRL use Tina Turner's 1989 version of "The Best" in their advertising. The league's ad agency Hertz Walpole had sufficient extra footage from her 1990 visit to Sydney to add fresh images of Tina to other recent shots of the 1990 finals series and 1991 pre-season training images.

The finished 1991 ad in its full length version shows Tina performing the song in the glamorous surroundings of Boomerang, a palatial harbour-side Sydney mansion. She climbs the Sydney Harbour Bridge and a spectacular final helicopter pull-back shot shows her belting out the anthem from the apex of the bridge. In those days before public access via the commercial BridgeClimb operation this image was as fantastic notionally as it was visually.

== Regular season ==
Team	1	2	3	4	5	6	7	8	9	10	11	12	13	14	15	16	17	18	19	20	21	22	F1	F2	F3	F4	GF
Balmain Tigers	**CBY** **−10**	CRO −40	NEW; 0	**EAS** **−9**	ILA −3	PEN −14	SOU −5	PAR −1	**BRI** **+10**	NOR −10	**GCS** **+8**	WES +13	**MAN** **+16**	STG −14	**CAN** **−20**	CBY −2	**CRO** **+14**	**NEW** **+9**	EAS +18	**ILA** **+10**	PEN −29	**SOU** **−2**					
Brisbane Broncos	**MAN** **+10**	STG −8	**CAN** **+14**	PAR +13	NOR −5	**GCS** **+26**	WES −1	**EAS** **−8**	BAL −10	**CRO** **+38**	**CBY** **−2**	SOU +16	**PEN** **+8**	ILA −17	NEW +10	MAN −26	**STG** **−2**	CAN +10	**PAR** **+24**	**NOR** **+38**	GCS +2	**WES** **+14**					
Canberra Raiders	NOR −5	**PAR** **+38**	BRI −14	**GCS** **+2**	WES −12	**MAN** **−34**	STG +16	**CRO** **+16**	**CBY** **+2**	SOU −8	**PEN** **+20**	ILA −7	NEW +12	**EAS** **−8**	BAL +20	**NOR** **+16**	PAR +14	**BRI** **−10**	GCS +6	**WES** **+28**	MAN +1	**STG** **+32**	X	WES +14	MAN +8	NOR +16	PEN −7
Canterbury-Bankstown Bulldogs	BAL +10	**EAS** **+10**	ILA −40	**PEN** **−20**	SOU −7	**NEW** **+28**	CRO; 0	**STG** **+10**	CAN −2	**PAR** **+18**	BRI +2	**NOR** **+9**	GCS +4	**WES** **−9**	MAN −10	**BAL** **+2**	EAS −20	**ILA** **+7**	PEN −4	**SOU** **+38**	NEW +14	**CRO** **+10**	**WES** **−5**				
Cronulla-Sutherland Sharks	NEW −20	**BAL** **+40**	EAS −4	**ILA**; **0**	PEN −7	**SOU** **+14**	**CBY**; **0**	CAN −16	**PAR** **−10**	BRI −38	**NOR** **−9**	GCS +4	**WES** **−2**	MAN; 0	**STG** **+2**	**NEW** **+8**	BAL −14	**EAS** **+34**	ILA −38	**PEN** **+2**	SOU +7	CBY −10					
Eastern Suburbs Roosters	**SOU** **−6**	CBY −10	**CRO** **+4**	BAL +9	NEW; 0	**ILA** **−21**	PEN −26	BRI +8	**NOR** **+2**	GCS +26	**WES** **+8**	MAN −8	**STG** **−14**	CAN +8	**PAR** **−22**	**SOU** **+2**	**CBY** **+20**	CRO −34	**BAL** **−18**	**NEW** **−10**	ILA −34	**PEN** **−34**					
Gold Coast Seagulls	**WES** **−6**	MAN −18	**STG**; **0**	CAN −2	**PAR** **+8**	BRI −26	**NOR** **−10**	ILA −42	NEW +4	**EAS** **−26**	BAL −8	**CRO** **−4**	**CBY** **−4**	SOU −16	**PEN** **−26**	WES −14	**MAN** **−4**	STG −8	**CAN** **−6**	PAR −20	**BRI** **−2**	NOR −22					
Illawarra Steelers	**PEN** **−22**	SOU +18	**CBY** **+40**	CRO; 0	**BAL** **+3**	EAS +21	NEW −14	**GCS** **+42**	WES −1	**MAN** **+14**	STG −8	**CAN** **+7**	PAR −2	**BRI** **+17**	NOR −22	PEN −6	**SOU** **+12**	CBY −7	**CRO** **+38**	BAL −10	**EAS** **+34**	**NEW** **+6**					
Manly Warringah Sea Eagles	BRI −10	**GCS** **+18**	WES +4	**NOR** **+4**	**STG** **+3**	CAN +34	**PAR** **+12**	SOU +9	**PEN** **−24**	ILA −14	NEW −1	**EAS** **+8**	BAL −16	**CRO**; **0**	**CBY** **+10**	**BRI** **+26**	GCS +4	**WES** **−1**	NOR +15	STG +2	**CAN** **−1**	PAR +10	X	**NOR** **−12**	**CAN** **−8**		
Newcastle Knights	**CRO** **+20**	PEN; 0	**BAL**; **0**	SOU +10	**EAS**; **0**	CBY −28	**ILA** **+14**	NOR −15	**GCS** **−4**	WES −29	**MAN** **+1**	STG −8	**CAN** **−12**	PAR −30	**BRI** **−10**	CRO −8	**PEN** **−14**	BAL −9	**SOU** **+16**	EAS +10	**CBY** **−14**	ILA −6					
North Sydney Bears	**CAN** **+5**	WES +3	**PAR** **+14**	MAN −4	**BRI** **+5**	**STG** **+7**	GCS +10	**NEW** **+15**	EAS −2	**BAL** **+10**	CRO +9	CBY −9	**SOU** **+2**	PEN −8	**ILA** **+22**	CAN −16	**WES** **+4**	PAR +6	**MAN** **−15**	BRI −38	STG; 0	**GCS** **+22**	X	MAN +12	PEN −2	**CAN** **−16**	
Parramatta Eels	**STG** **−26**	CAN −38	NOR −14	**BRI** **−13**	GCS −8	**WES** **−35**	MAN −12	**BAL** **+1**	CRO +10	CBY −18	**SOU** **−8**	PEN −6	**ILA** **+2**	**NEW** **+30**	EAS +22	STG −28	**CAN** **−14**	**NOR** **−6**	BRI −24	**GCS** **+20**	WES −8	**MAN** **−10**					
Penrith Panthers	ILA +22	**NEW**; **0**	**SOU** **+14**	CBY +20	**CRO** **+7**	**BAL** **+14**	**EAS** **+26**	**WES** **−4**	MAN +24	**STG** **+2**	CAN −20	**PAR** **+6**	BRI −8	**NOR** **+8**	GCS +26	**ILA** **+6**	NEW +14	SOU +11	**CBY** **+4**	CRO −2	**BAL** **+29**	EAS +34	X	X	**NOR** **+2**	X	**CAN** **+7**
South Sydney Rabbitohs	EAS +6	**ILA** **−18**	PEN −14	**NEW** **−10**	**CBY** **+7**	CRO −14	**BAL** **+5**	**MAN** **−9**	STG −24	**CAN** **+8**	PAR +8	**BRI** **−16**	NOR −2	**GCS** **+16**	WES −2	EAS −2	ILA −12	**PEN** **−11**	NEW −16	CBY −38	**CRO** **−7**	BAL +2					
St. George Dragons	PAR +26	**BRI** **+8**	GCS; 0	**WES** **+2**	MAN −3	NOR −7	**CAN** **−16**	CBY −10	**SOU** **+24**	PEN −2	**ILA** **+8**	**NEW** **+8**	EAS +14	**BAL** **+14**	CRO −2	**PAR** **+28**	BRI +2	**GCS** **+8**	WES; 0	**MAN** **−2**	**NOR**; **0**	CAN −32					
Western Suburbs Magpies	GCS +6	**NOR** **−3**	**MAN** **−4**	STG −2	**CAN** **+12**	PAR +35	**BRI** **+1**	PEN +4	**ILA** **+1**	**NEW** **+29**	EAS −8	**BAL** **−13**	CRO +2	CBY +9	**SOU** **+2**	**GCS** **+14**	NOR −4	MAN +1	**STG**; **0**	CAN −28	**PAR** **+8**	BRI −14	CBY +5	**CAN** **−14**			
Team	1	2	3	4	5	6	7	8	9	10	11	12	13	14	15	16	17	18	19	20	21	22	F1	F2	F3	F4	GF

Bold – Home game
X – Bye
Opponent for round listed above margin

=== Ladder ===
	Team	Pld	W	D	L	PF	PA	PD	Pts
1	**Penrith (P)**	22	17	1	4	483	250	+233	35
2	Manly	22	14	1	7	391	299	+92	29
3	North Sydney	22	14	1	7	345	303	+42	29
4	Canberra	22	14	0	8	452	327	+125	28
5	Canterbury	22	13	1	8	424	374	+50	27
6	Western Suburbs	22	13	1	8	359	311	+48	27
7	Brisbane	22	13	0	9	470	326	+144	26
8	Illawarra	22	12	1	9	451	291	+160	25
9	St. George	22	11	3	8	388	320	+68	25
10	Cronulla	22	8	3	11	384	441	-57	19
11	Eastern Suburbs	22	9	1	12	337	487	-150	19
12	Balmain	22	8	1	13	351	412	-61	17
13	Newcastle	22	6	3	13	308	424	-116	15
14	South Sydney	22	7	0	15	370	513	-143	14
15	Parramatta	22	6	0	16	351	534	-183	12
16	Gold Coast	22	2	1	19	240	492	-252	5

=== Ladder progression ===
- Numbers highlighted in green indicate that the team finished the round inside the top 5.
- Numbers highlighted in blue indicates the team finished first on the ladder in that round.
- Numbers highlighted in red indicates the team finished last place on the ladder in that round.

	Team	1	2	3	4	5	6	7	8	9	10	11	12	13	14	15	16	17	18	19	20	21	22
1	Penrith Panthers	2	3	5	7	9	11	13	13	15	17	17	19	19	21	23	25	27	29	31	31	33	35
2	Manly Warringah Sea Eagles	0	2	4	6	8	10	12	14	14	14	14	16	16	17	19	21	23	23	25	27	27	29
3	North Sydney Bears	2	4	6	6	8	10	12	14	14	16	18	18	20	20	22	22	24	26	26	26	27	29
4	Canberra Raiders	0	2	2	4	4	4	6	8	10	10	12	12	14	14	16	18	20	20	22	24	26	28
5	Canterbury-Bankstown Bulldogs	2	4	4	4	4	6	7	9	9	11	13	15	17	17	17	19	19	21	21	23	25	27
6	Western Suburbs Magpies	2	2	2	2	4	6	8	10	12	14	14	14	16	18	20	22	22	24	25	25	27	27
7	Brisbane Broncos	2	2	4	6	6	8	8	8	8	10	10	12	14	14	16	16	16	18	20	22	24	26
8	Illawarra Steelers	0	2	4	5	7	9	9	11	11	13	13	15	15	17	17	17	19	19	21	21	23	25
9	St. George Dragons	2	4	5	7	7	7	7	7	9	9	11	13	15	17	17	19	21	23	24	24	25	25
10	Cronulla-Sutherland Sharks	0	2	2	3	3	5	6	6	6	6	6	8	8	9	11	13	13	15	15	17	19	19
11	Eastern Suburbs Roosters	0	0	2	4	5	5	5	7	9	11	13	13	13	15	15	17	19	19	19	19	19	19
12	Balmain Tigers	0	0	1	1	1	1	1	1	3	3	5	7	9	9	9	9	11	13	15	17	17	17
13	Newcastle Knights	2	3	4	6	7	7	9	9	9	9	11	11	11	11	11	11	11	11	13	15	15	15
14	South Sydney Rabbitohs	2	2	2	2	4	4	6	6	6	8	10	10	10	12	12	12	12	12	12	12	12	14
15	Parramatta Eels	0	0	0	0	0	0	0	2	4	4	4	4	6	8	10	10	10	10	10	12	12	12
16	Gold Coast Seagulls	0	0	1	1	3	3	3	3	5	5	5	5	5	5	5	5	5	5	5	5	5	5

== Finals ==
Home	Score	Away	Match information
Home	Score	Away	Date and time	Venue	Referee	Crowd
Playoff
Canterbury-Bankstown Bulldogs	14–19	Western Suburbs Magpies	27 August 1991	Parramatta Stadium	Bill Harrigan	17,022
Preliminary semi-finals
Canberra Raiders	22–8	Western Suburbs Magpies	31 August 1991	Sydney Football Stadium	Eddie Ward	24,792
Manly-Warringah Sea Eagles	16–28	North Sydney Bears	1 September 1991	Sydney Football Stadium	Bill Harrigan	32,878
Semi-finals
Manly-Warringah Sea Eagles	26–34	Canberra Raiders	7 September 1991	Sydney Football Stadium	Bill Harrigan	34,707
Penrith Panthers	16–14	North Sydney Bears	8 September 1991	Sydney Football Stadium	Eddie Ward	38,635
Preliminary final
North Sydney Bears	14–30	Canberra Raiders	15 September 1991	Sydney Football Stadium	Bill Harrigan	39,665
Grand final
Penrith Panthers	19-12	Canberra Raiders	22 September 1991	Sydney Football Stadium	Bill Harrigan	41,815

=== Chart ===
Qualifying final
2	Manly	16
3	North Sydney	28
4	Canberra	22
5	Western Suburbs	8

Major semi-final
1	Penrith	16
North Sydney	14
Minor semi-final
Manly	26
Canberra	34

Preliminary final
North Sydney	14
Canberra	30

Grand final
Penrith	19
Canberra	12

=== Grand final ===
On the sunny afternoon of Sunday, 22 September the Sydney Football Stadium was packed to capacity with a crowd of 41,815 for the rematch of the previous season's grand final, and Canberra's third in a row. The day also featured a tribute to the original 'Gladiators', Norm Provan and Arthur Summons on the Winfield Cup trophy's 10th anniversary (in the 50th grand final played) as well as a rendition of the national anthem by Anthony Warlow. The game was broadcast live on television throughout Australia by Channel Ten with match commentary by Graeme Hughes, Bill Anderson and Wayne Pearce. This would be Ten's final rugby league broadcast, as the Nine Network took over the rights the following season.

Penrith Panthers	Position	Canberra Raiders
1 Greg Barwick	FB	1 Gary Belcher
2 Graham Mackay	WG	2 Paul Martin
3 Brad Fittler	CE	3 Mal Meninga (c)
4 Col Bentley	CE	4 Mark Bell
5 Paul Smith	WG	5 Matthew Wood
6 Steve Carter	5/8th	6 Laurie Daley
7 Greg Alexander (c)	HB	7 Ricky Stuart
8 Paul Clarke	PR	8 Brent Todd
9 Royce Simmons	HK	9 Steve Walters
10 Paul Dunn	PR	10 Glenn Lazarus
11 Mark Geyer	SR	11 David Barnhill
12 Barry Walker	SR	12 Gary Coyne
13 Colin van der Voort	LF	13 Bradley Clyde
15 John Cartwright	Int.	16 Scott Gale
16 Brad Izzard	Int.	19 Michael Twigg
	Int.	40 Darren Fritz
Phil Gould	Coach	Tim Sheens

1st half

Referee Bill Harrigan blew time on and the Penrith side kicked off. Around seven minutes later when Penrith had made their way into good field position, their hooker Royce Simmons received the ball about ten metres from the try-line and ran it, stepping and spinning his way past several defenders to score a great individual try, his first of the season. Penrith captain Greg Alexander kicked the conversion for his side to lead 6–0. Shortly after that Canberra's half-back Ricky Stuart got the ball a few metres into Penrith's half and kicked over to the open left corner of the field where his winger, Matthew Wood was racing through to grab the bouncing ball and dive over in the corner to score. Meninga's conversion attempt missed so the Penrith side held their lead at 6–4. The scores were levelled a few minutes later though when Alexander appeared to be trying to put his knees into Meninga as he tackled him, drawing a penalty, which Canberra captain successfully kicked to make it 6-6. Meninga later opted to take the kick when awarded another penalty inside Penrith's half, but missed. Soon after that Canberra had the ball on the right wing around half way and swung it through the hands out to the left where their lock forward Bradley Clyde made a break and passed it on to Wood to again cross in the corner for his second try. Meninga's kick was wide again so the Raiders were leading 6–10.

The contest continued to be played from end to end of the field. In the final minutes of the first half, during one of Canberra's attacking raids they got another penalty and Matthew Wood took the kick, getting another two points for his side to lead 6-12 going into the break. The Raiders lead could have easily been 18-6 had Penrith winger Graham Mackay not pulled off a great try-saving tackle only metres from the line on his opposite number Paul Martin close to half-time. The half-time score replicated the position of the two teams at the same point in the previous year's decider.

2nd half

Early in the second half Canberra were penalised for stripping in their own half of the field and Alexander took the kick at goal but missed. Then as the Canberra side were trying to work the ball away from their goal-line, they knocked on, with Penrith winger Paul Smith getting the ball and diving over in the corner. However referee Bill Harrigan called the play back after touch judge Martin Weekes reported that Canberra's Mark Bell had been taken out with a swinging arm. Penrith forward Mark Geyer's reaction to the ruling prompted Harrigan to send him to the sin bin for ten minutes. Later the Penrith club appeared certain to score from close range through Brad Izzard but Canberra's lone defender Laurie Daley stripped the ball in a one-on-one tackle.

Penrith's unsuccessful scoring opportunities continued until finally, after working the ball up to the opposition's half, they kept it alive on the third tackle till Brad Izzard broke free from over twenty metres out and ran to the try-line to touch down behind the uprights. The scores were brought level at 12 all when Alexander kicked the extra two points. With just under seven minutes of the match remaining, and again having worked the ball into Canberra's half of the field, Penrith on the fifth tackle passed it to Greg Alexander just past the forty-metre line to kick a field goal, getting his side a one-point lead at 13–12. Penrith continued to enjoy the majority of possession and field position, and when the Raiders attempted a short line drop-out Geyer got the bouncing ball in open space, passing it to 33-year-old Royce Simmons who scored in the corner, getting Penrith their first premiership in the last match of his career. Alexander kicked the conversion from the sideline so the final score was 19–12.

22 September 1991

Penrith Panthers	19 – 12	Canberra Raiders
Tries: Royce Simmons 2 Brad Izzard 1 Goals: Greg Alexander 3/5; Field Goals: Greg Alexander 1/1; 10 Min. Sin Bin: Mark Geyer 1	1st: 6 - 12; 2nd: 13 - 0 Report	Tries: Matthew Wood 2 Goals: Mal Meninga 1/4; Matthew Wood 1/1

Sydney Football Stadium
Attendance: 41,815
Referee: Bill Harrigan
Clive Churchill Medal: Bradley Clyde

Post match

Although MMI's unofficial man-of-the-match award went to Royce Simmons, the Governor of New South Wales Peter Sinclair awarded the Clive Churchill Medal to the losing side's Bradley Clyde, the second time that he won the prestigious award, having previously won the Clive Churchill medal in 1989. The Australian Prime Minister Bob Hawke then presented Penrith captain Greg Alexander with the Winfield Cup trophy as well as the J. J. Giltinan Shield. It was the Penrith Panthers' first premiership and their young coach, Phil Gould has rated his team's second half in this game as an example of a perfect half of football. After failing to follow their first half game plan and squandering an early lead, in the second half the Panthers played to a formula of taking the ball up for full sets of six tackles, with Alexander then expertly kicking for the corners and the whole side pinning Canberra down at their own end with committed defence.

=== World Club Challenge ===
Having won the premiership, the Panthers travelled to England to face the British Champions, Wigan in the 1991 World Club Challenge on 9 October at Anfield, Liverpool. Penrith were defeated 21–4 in front of 20,152 spectators.

== Player statistics ==
The following statistics are as of the conclusion of Round 22.

Top 5 point scorers

Points	Player	Tries	Goals	Field goals
172	Daryl Halligan	12	62	0
170	Matthew Ridge	6	72	2
155	Jason Taylor	1	73	5
146	Ricky Walford	9	55	0
140	Mal Meninga	11	48	0

Top 5 try scorers

Tries	Player
19	Alan McIndoe
15	Graham Mackay
15	Steve Renouf
13	Paul Smith
13	Ewan McGrady

Top 5 goal scorers

Goals	Player
73	Jason Taylor
72	Matthew Ridge
62	Daryl Halligan
55	Ricky Walford
48	Mal Meninga

== Attendances ==
The regular season attendances for the 1991 season aggregated to a total of 2,413,218 at an average of 13,188 per game.

The highest ten regular season match attendances:

Crowd	Venue	Home team	Opponent	Round
28,884	Adelaide Oval	St. George Dragons	Balmain Tigers	Round 14
27,904	Marathon Stadium	Newcastle Knights	Balmain Tigers	Round 3
26,165	Lang Park	Brisbane Broncos	Penrith Panthers	Round 13
25,126	Lang Park	Brisbane Broncos	Manly-Warringah Sea Eagles	Round 1
24,460	Bruce Stadium	Canberra Raiders	St. George Dragons	Round 22
23,849	Lang Park	Brisbane Broncos	Gold Coast Seagulls	Round 6
23,801	Lang Park	Brisbane Broncos	Canberra Raiders	Round 3
23,518	Marathon Stadium	Newcastle Knights	Eastern Suburbs Roosters	Round 5
22,682	Marathon Stadium	Newcastle Knights	Brisbane Broncos	Round 15
22,032	North Sydney Oval	North Sydney Bears	Manly-Warringah Sea Eagles	Round 19
