= Darren Willis =

Darren Willis may refer to:

- Darren Willis (American football) (born 1964), Arizona State and Tampa Bay Storm player
- Darren Willis (rugby league) (born 1968), Penrith Panthers and Western Suburbs player
