= Col Bentley =

Australian rugby league footballer

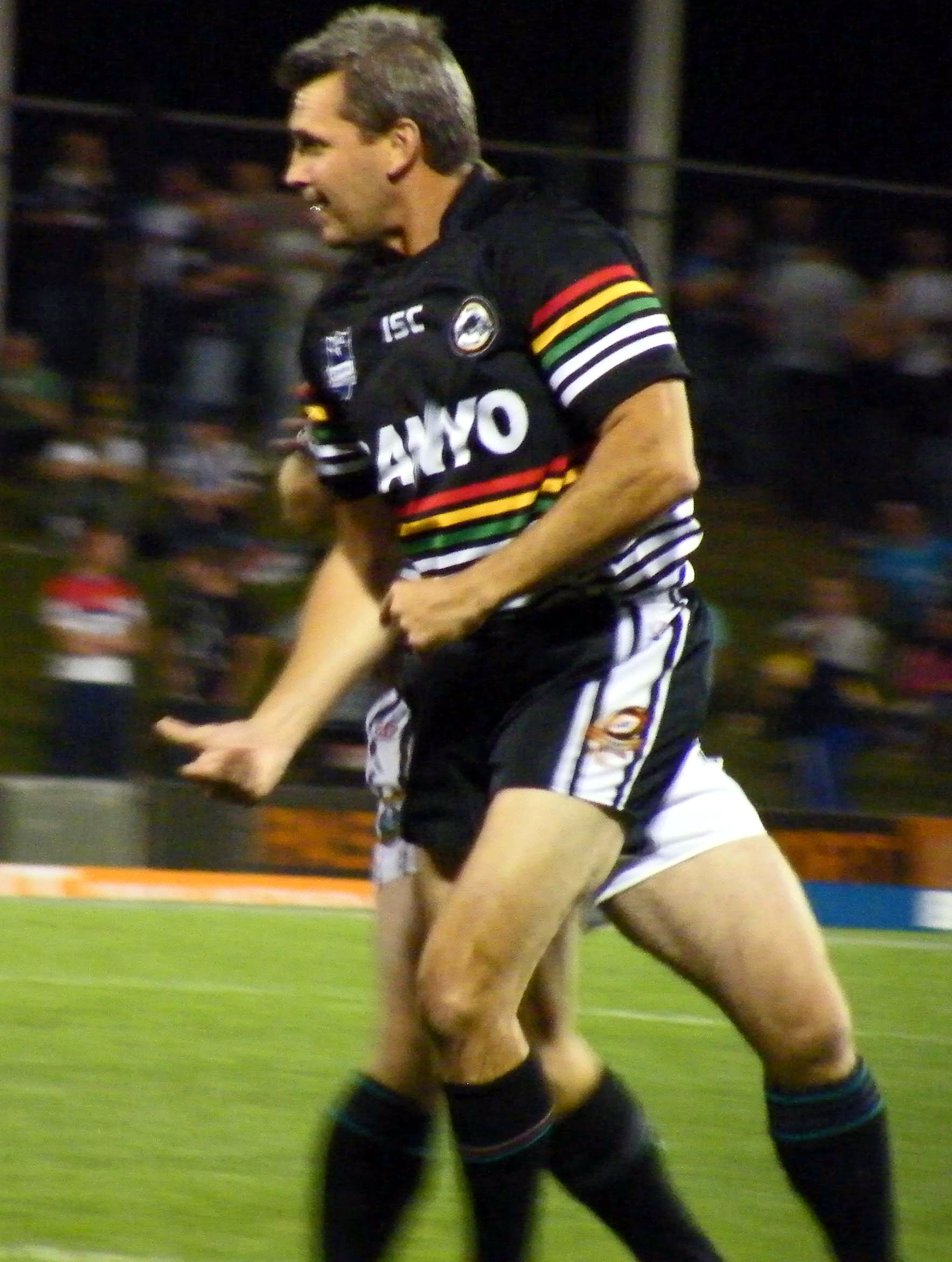

Personal information
- Born: 2 September 1964 (age 62) Cudgen, New South Wales, Australia

Playing information
- Position: Centre
Club
Years	Team	Pld	T	G	FG	P
1986–92	Penrith Panthers	108	12	0	0	48
1993–94	Manly Sea Eagles	3	0	0	0	0
1995	Penrith Panthers	6	0	0	0	0
	Total	117	12	0	0	48
- Source: As of 4 September 2016

Col Bentley (born 2 September 1964) is an Australian former professional rugby league footballer who played for the Penrith Panthers in the Winfield Cup and the Manly-Warringah Sea Eagles in the ARL. He played as a centre and also as an interchange.

Bentley won the 1991 NSWRL Grand Final with Penrith.

After his retirement from playing, Bentley served on the NRL Judiciary board between 1998 and 1999. In 2002 Bentley was elected to the board of the Penrith District Rugby League Football Club.
