= 1991 World Club Challenge =

Intercontinental rugby league match

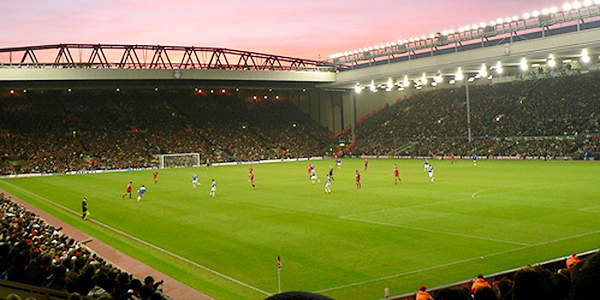
- Anfield hosted the match
Wigan	Penrith Panthers
(RFL)	(NSWRL)
21	4
	1	2	Total
WIG	14	7	21
PEN	4	0	4
- Date: 2 October 1991
- Stadium: Anfield
- Location: Liverpool, England
- Frano Botica
- Referee: Alain Sablayrolles (France)
- Attendance: 20,152

Broadcast partners
- Broadcasters: BBC (United Kingdom); Network Ten (Australia)
- Commentators: Ray French; Alex Murphy

The 1991 World Club Challenge (marketed as the Foster's World Club Challenge due to sponsorship from the brewer) was contested by 1990–91 RFL Championship winners, Wigan and 1991 NSWRL season premiers, the Penrith Panthers. The match was played on a dry Wednesday 2 October 1991 at Anfield, Liverpool. A crowd of 20,152 was in attendance for the game which was refereed by Frenchman Alain Sablayrolles.

== Teams ==
Wigan	Penrith

FB	1	Steve Hampson
RW	2	David Myers
CE	3	Sam Panapa
CE	4	Joe Lydon
LW	5	Frano Botica
SO	6	Shaun Edwards
SH	7	Andy Gregory (c)
PR	8	Kelvin Skerrett
HK	9	Martin Dermott
PR	10	Andy Platt
SR	11	Denis Betts
SR	12	Billy McGinty
LF	13	Phil Clarke
Substitutions:
IC	14	Ian Lucas
IC	15	Ian Gildart
IC	16	Neil Cowie
IC	17	Mike Forshaw
Coach:
(Australia) John Monie

FB	1	Greg Barwick
RW	2	Darren Willis
CE	3	Graeme Bradley
CE	4	Brad Izzard
LW	5	Graham Mackay
FE	6	Steve Carter
HB	7	Greg Alexander (c)
PR	8	Brandon Lee
HK	9	Royce Simmons
PR	10	Paul Dunn
SR	11	Paul Clarke
SR	12	John Cartwright
LK	13	Colin van der Voort
Substitutions:
IC	14	Ben Alexander
IC	15	Grant Izzard
IC	16	Tony Xuereb
IC	17	Paul Smith
Coach:
(Australia) Phil Gould

== Match details ==
Wednesday 2 October

Wigan	21 – 4	Penrith Panthers
Tries: David Myers; Sam Panapa; Goals: Frano Botica (6); Field Goals: Joe Lydon (1)		Tries: Darren Willis Goals: Greg Alexander (0/2)

Anfield, Liverpool
Attendance: 20,152
Referee: Alain Sablayrolles (France)
Player of the Match: Frano Botica

Penrith were without their star grand final forward Mark Geyer due to ankle injury that required surgery while Brad Fittler was unavailable as he was part of the Australian Kangaroos team on their end of season tour of Papua New Guinea (Fittler made his test debut for Australia 4 days after the WCC). By just the 13th minute Wigan had gotten away to a handy lead with the score at 8 - 0 after Frano Botica kicked four consecutive penalties. Penrith then answered five minutes later with an unconverted try from Darren Wills. However this was to be the last time Penrith scored in the match. Wigan's Sam Panapa got their first try in the 27th minute which was converted by Botica, bringing the scoreline to 14 - 4 which lasted until half-time.

No points were scored in the second half of the game until two thirds of the way through when Botica kicked a fifth penalty goal. David Myers scored Wigan's second try and the last of the match in the 77th minute. Just before the full-time whistle, Joe Lydon successfully kicked a field goal, adding insult to injury and making the final score Wigan 21, Penrith 4.
