= Colin van der Voort =

Australian rugby league footballer

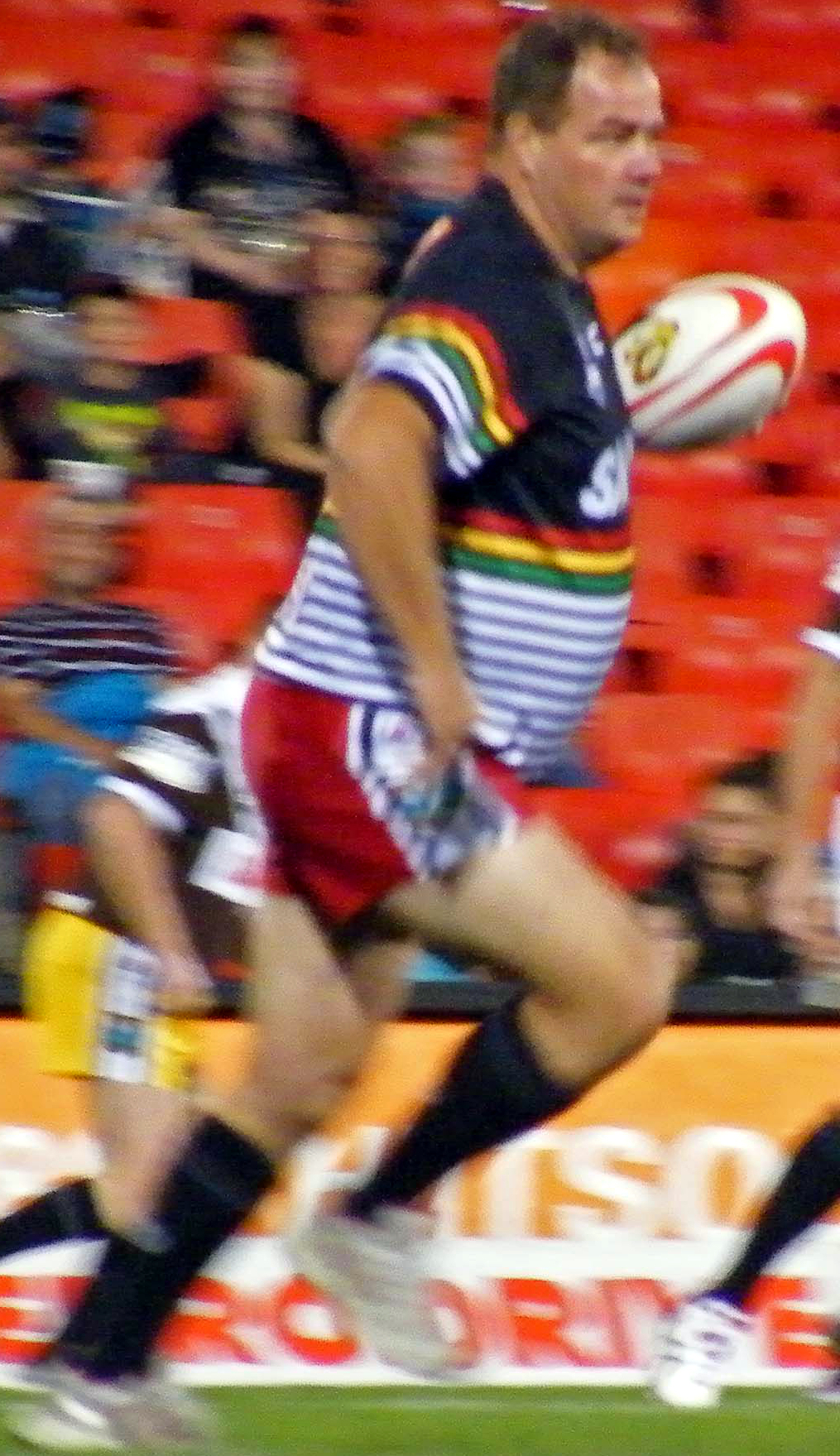

Personal information
- Full name: Colin van der Voort
- Born: 13 June 1965 (age 61)

Playing information
- Position: Lock, Second-row, Hooker
Club
Years	Team	Pld	T	G	FG	P
1986–94	Penrith Panthers	117	7	0	0	28
Representative
Years	Team	Pld	T	G	FG	P
1991–92	NSW City	2	0	0	0	0

Colin van der Voort (born 13 July 1965) is an Australian former professional rugby league footballer who played in the 1980s and 1990s. He played in the New South Wales Rugby League's Winfield Cup Premiership with the Penrith Panthers from 1986 to 1994 and was a member of the club's grand final-winning team in the 1991 season.

== Playing career ==
He made his first grade debut for Penrith in round 11 1986 against the Illawarra Steelers at Penrith Park.

He missed Penrith's 1990 Grand Final appearance due to injury.

Following their 1991 grand final victory, van der Voort travelled with the Penrith to England for the 1991 World Club Challenge which was lost to Wigan.

He was selected but never played a representative game for New South Wales or Australia through injuries.

His final game in the top grade came against the Parramatta Eels in round 22 1994 at Penrith Park which Penrith lost 23–16.

== Accolades ==
On 4 October 2006, van der Voort was named in the lock forward position of a 40-year Panthers Legends team.
