= Craig Izzard =

Australian rugby league footballer

Personal information
- Born: 20 July 1964 (age 62) Penrith, New South Wales, Australia

Playing information
- Position: Second-row, Lock
Club
| Years | Team | Pld | T | G | FG | P |
|---|---|---|---|---|---|---|
| 1983–87 | Penrith Panthers | 41 | 1 | 0 | 0 | 4 |
| 1988–90 | Parramatta Eels | 40 | 6 | 0 | 0 | 24 |
| 1989–90 | Leeds RLFC | 12 | 3 | 0 | 0 | 12 |
| 1991 | Balmain Tigers | 8 | 0 | 0 | 0 | 0 |
| 1992–93 | Illawarra Steelers | 30 | 2 | 0 | 0 | 8 |
| | Total | 131 | 12 | 0 | 0 | 48 |
- Relatives: Brad Izzard (brother); Grant Izzard (brother)

Craig Izzard (born 20 July 1964) is an Australian former professional rugby league footballer who played in the 1980s and 1990s. He played for the Penrith Panthers, Parramatta Eels, Balmain Tigers and the Illawarra Steelers in the New South Wales Rugby League competition in Australia, initially as a centre and later in his career as a second-row. He also had a short stint at the Leeds club in England in 1989.

== Playing career ==
Younger brother of Brad Izzard and older brother to Grant, Craig Izzard began his career at local club Penrith, captaining their reserve-grade side to a premiership in 1987, playing at centre. He moved to Parramatta in 1988, citing a lack of opportunities with Penrith, winning the clubman of the year award in 1989. After finding it difficult again to hold down a regular first-grade spot, Izzard moved to Balmain in 1991, and then Illawarra in 1992, transforming himself into a tireless second-rower. He finished his playing career with the Steelers in 1993.

== Post playing ==
In 2004, Izzard become manager of the New South Wales Residents rugby league side.

In 2017, he was found corrupt by the Independent Commission Against Corruption for agreeing to accept bribes in exchange for not investigating unlawful asbestos dumping during his employment as an anti-dumping investigator.

A former investigator with the Western Sydney Regional Illegal Dumping Squad (RIDS), was found to have engaged in "serious corrupt conduct" by the commission on Tuesday. The matter was then referred to the Director of Public Prosecutions for the consideration of criminal charges.

He also featured in an ABC Four Corners investigation Trashed: The dirty truth about your rubbish, by Caro Meldrum-Hanna which went to air 7 August 2017.
