= Grant Izzard =

Australian rugby league footballer

Personal information
- Full name: Grant Izzard
- Born: 16 February 1970 (age 55) Penrith, New South Wales, Australia

Playing information
- Position: Centre
Club
Years	Team	Pld	T	G	FG	P
1990–92	Penrith Panthers	12	1	0	0	4
1993	Illawarra Steelers	10	1	0	0	4
	Total	22	2	0	0	8
- Source: As of 19 July 2019
- Relatives: Craig Izzard (brother); Brad Izzard (brother)

Grant Izzard (born in Penrith, New South Wales) is an Australian former professional rugby league footballer who played in the 1990s. He played for the Penrith Panthers and the Illawarra Steelers of the New South Wales Rugby League premiership. His position of choice was at centre and he is also the younger brother of rugby league player Craig Izzard.

== Playing career ==
Izzard was a Penrith local junior who followed in the footsteps of his older brother. Following their 1991 grand final victory he travelled with the Panthers to England for the 1991 World Club Challenge which was lost to Wigan.

Lack of opportunity at his home club meant that he was forced to move on eventually signing with the Illawarra Steelers in 1993. The beginning of a new season at his new club looked promising until he was cited for biting South Sydney player Craig Field and was subsequently suspended for six weeks. Izzard failed to regain his form or position in the first grade side.

== Sources ==
- Alan Whiticker & Glen Hudson (2007). The Encyclopedia of Rugby League Players. Wetherill Park, New South Wales: Gary Allen Pty Ltd. ISBN 978-1-877082-93-1.
