= Darren Willis (rugby league) =

Australian rugby league footballer

Personal information
- Born: 1 October 1968 (age 57)

Playing information
- Position: Wing
Club
Years	Team	Pld	T	G	FG	P
1989–91	Penrith Panthers	20	5	0	0	20
1992–98	Western Suburbs	144	49	0	0	196
	Total	164	54	0	0	216
Representative
Years	Team	Pld	T	G	FG	P
1993–97	NSW Country	4	0	0	0	0

Darren Willis (born 1 October 1968) is an Australian former professional rugby league footballer who played for Penrith and Western Suburbs.

== Playing career ==
Willis played mostly on the wing and occasionally as a centre. He started his career at Penrith, which he came to from Lithgow Workies.

While with Penrith he made 20 first-grade appearances, nine of them in the club's premiership winning 1991 season. He didn't take part in Penrith's finals campaign, but travelled to England to play in the 1991 World Club Challenge against Wigan and scored their only try in a losing cause.

From 1992 to 1998 he played for Western Suburbs, featuring in 144 first-grade games and scoring 49 tries. His final game in the top grade was in Round 21 1998 against Canterbury-Bankstown which ended in a 56-14 loss at Belmore Sports Ground. During this time he represented NSW Country as a winger in four City vs Country Origin fixtures.
