= Michael Twigg =

Australian rugby league footballer

Personal information
- Full name: Michael Twigg
- Born: 12 November 1967 (age 57)

Playing information
- Position: Five-eighth, Halfback
Club
Years	Team	Pld	T	G	FG	P
1989–91	Canberra Raiders	14	0	0	0	0
- Source: As of 10 April 2019

Michael Twigg (born 12 November 1967) is an Australian former professional rugby league footballer who played in the 1980s and 1990s. He played for the Canberra Raiders in the New South Wales Rugby League (NSWRL) competition.

== Playing career ==
Twigg made his debut for Canberra against Cronulla-Sutherland in Round 16 1989 at Seiffert Oval. Twigg only managed one further appearance for Canberra that season and did not play in the club maiden premiership victory against Balmain. The following season, Twigg only made one appearance for the club and did not feature in Canberra's second consecutive premiership victory.

In 1991, Twigg featured in more games and was included on the bench for the 1991 NSWRL grand final against the Penrith Panthers. Canberra lead the match at halftime but Penrith came from behind to win their first premiership 19–12. The grand final defeat would also be Twigg's last appearance for the club.
