= Brad Izzard =

Australian rugby league footballer

Personal information
- Full name: Brad John Izzard
- Born: 6 May 1962 (age 64) Blacktown, New South Wales, Australia

Playing information
- Position: Centre, Five-eighth
Club
Years	Team	Pld	T	G	FG	P
1982–92	Penrith Panthers	206	73	0	0	283
Representative
Years	Team	Pld	T	G	FG	P
1982–91	New South Wales	4	2	0	0	6
- Source: As of 6 November 2019
- Relatives: Craig Izzard (brother); Grant Izzard (brother)

Brad Izzard (born 6 May 1962 in Blacktown, New South Wales) is an Australian former professional rugby league footballer who played in the 1980s and 1990s. He played for the Penrith Panthers in the New South Wales Rugby League competition in Australia as well as playing four games for the New South Wales State of Origin side. His position of choice was at centre. He is the brother of Scott, Craig and Grant Izzard.

== Playing career ==
Izzard was a local junior for Penrith making his first grade debut for the club in the 1982 season. Izzard was called up to the New South Wales side in game one of State of Origin in his debut year playing on the wing though injury ruled him out of the remaining matches for his state and country played that year.

Fitness problems went on to hamper his relationship with several of his coaches such as Tim Sheens and Ron Willey but playing under Phil Gould in 1991 his efforts on the field became instrumental in his team's success helping them to a grand final premiership victory.

Following the grand final victory he travelled with the Panthers to England for the 1991 World Club Challenge which was lost to Wigan. The following season several neck injuries reduced the amount of time he was able to play eventually having to retire when it was revealed it was a chronic problem.

At the time of his retirement in 1992 until Greg Alexander surpassed him in the 1998 season, he was the second most capped Penrith Panthers player behind Royce Simmons. He currently ranks at 7th.
