= List of Cronulla-Sutherland Sharks coaches =

There have been 22 coaches of the Cronulla Sharks since their first season in 1967.

== List of coaches ==
No.	Name	Seasons	Games	Wins	Losses	Draws	Winning percentage	Premiers	Runners-up	Minor premiers	Wooden spoons
1	Ken Kearney	1967−1969	66	14	51	1	21.2%	—	—	—	1967, 1969
2	Tommy Bishop	1970−1973, 1980	114	55	57	2	48.2%	—	1973	—	—
3	Noel Thornton	1974	22	9	13	0	40.9%	—	—	—	—
4	Johnny Raper	1975−1976	44	18	24	2	40.9%	—	—	—	—
5	Ted Glossop	1977	22	13	9	0	59.1%	—	—	—	—
6	Norm Provan	1978−1980	51	32	17	2	62.7%	—	1978	—	—
7	Greg Pierce	1981−1982	50	26	22	2	52%	—	—	—	—
8	Terry Fearnley	1983−1984	50	22	27	1	44%	—	—	—	—
9	Jack Gibson	1985−1987	72	31	39	2	43.1%	—	—	—	—
10	Allan Fitzgibbon	1988−1991	92	50	37	5	54.3%	—	—	1988	—
11	Arthur Beetson	1992−1993	44	17	27	0	38.6%	—	—	—	—
12	John Lang	1994−2001	206	126	75	5	61.2%	—	—	1999	—
13	Chris Anderson	2002−2003	51	24	27	0	47.1%	—	—	—	—
14	Stuart Raper	2004−2006	73	31	42	0	42.5%	—	—	—	—
15	Ricky Stuart	2006−2010	91	38	53	0	41.8%	—	—	—	—
16	Shane Flanagan	2010−2013, 2015−2018	185	102	81	2	55.1%	2016	—	—	—
17	Peter Sharp	2014	16	4	12	0	25%	—	—	—	—
18	James Shepherd	2014	10	2	8	0	20%	—	—	—	2014
19	John Morris	2019−2021	51	24	27	0	47.1%	—	—	—	—
20	Josh Hannay	2021	19	8	11	0	42.1%	—	—	—	—
21	Craig Fitzgibbon	2022−	40	26	14	0	63.2%	—	—	—	—
22	Steve Price	2022	1	0	1	0	0%	—	—	—	—

== See also ==
- List of current NRL coaches
- List of current NRL Women's coaches
