= George Moroko =

Australian rugby league footballer

Personal information
- Born: 5 January 1957 (age 68)

Playing information
- Position: Prop, Second-row
Club
Years	Team	Pld	T	G	FG	P
1981–82	Western Suburbs	25	2	0	0	6
1983–84	Cronulla-Sutherland	21	5	0	0	20
1985	St. George	2	0	0	0	0
	Total	48	7	0	0	26

George Moroko (born 5 January 1957) is an Australian former professional rugby league footballer who played for Western Suburbs, Cronulla and St. George in the early 1980s.

== Biography ==
A Western Suburbs junior, Moroko had a stint in Brisbane playing for Souths, before being lured back to the Sydney club for the 1981 NSWRFL season. He was used as a second rower at Western Suburbs, then switched to the front row when he played at Cronulla in 1983 and 1984.

Moroko, who captained Cronulla, finished his career with two first-grade games at St. George in 1985 and was captain of the club's reserves premiership that year.

His son, Nick, played in the Toyota Cup for Cronulla.
