= Tony Sitford =

English footballer

Personal information
- Full name: Jack Anthony Sitford
- Date of birth: 28 January 1940 (age 86)
- Place of birth: Crowborough, England
- Height: 6 ft 1 in (1.85 m)
- Positions: Forward; full back

Youth career
- Brighton & Hove Albion

Senior career*
| Years | Team | Apps | (Gls) |
| 1959–1962 | Brighton & Hove Albion | 22 | (2) |
| 1962–1963 | Gravesend & Northfleet | | |
| 1963–1969 | Dartford | | |
| 1969–1974 | Gravesend & Northfleet | | |

Managerial career
- 1974–1981: Gravesend & Northfleet
- 198?–198?: Welling United
- 1985–2012: Corinthian
- * Club domestic league appearances and goals

Jack Anthony Sitford (born 28 January 1940) is an English former professional footballer who played as a forward or full back in the Football League for Brighton & Hove Albion.

== Life and career ==
Sitford was born in Crowborough, East Sussex, in 1940, and joined Brighton & Hove Albion's ground staff as a teenager. He turned professional in March 1959, and made his first-team debut in October 1960, in a League Cup tie away to Notts County. He made most of his 24 first-team appearances the following season, as well as scoring his second senior goal. In February 1962, he put his side ahead after 15 seconds against Second Division leaders Liverpool at Anfield. The Liverpool Echo was unimpressed: "In 15 seconds Brighton were a goal up. There was nothing special about their down-the-centre approach or about the shot which scored, except that it was hit unexpectedly and found the net just inside the upright to Slater's left", going on to point out that "Brighton consisted of 10 defenders and a centre-forward and apart from Sitford's goal he had done nothing." Brighton lost 3-1, and Sitford was one of many players to leave the club at the end of the season.

He spent just over a year with Gravesend & Northfleet, during which he scored the goal that took his team through to the fourth round proper of the FA Cup, eliminating Third Division club Carlisle United on their own ground. He followed that with nearly six years at another Southern League club, Dartford, where he was Player of the Season for 1967–68. Sitford returned to Gravesend & Northfleet in 1969, and helped them finish third in 1970–71 to gain promotion to the Premier Division.

Sitford took over as manager in 1974, and led the team to the Southern League Division One South title in 1974–75 and won the Southern League Cup in 1978. The team's performances in the Southern League Premier Division were good enough to secure admission to the newly formed Alliance Premier League, in which they finished fifth in its inaugural season. He left the club in 1980.

He had a spell as manager of Welling United before beginning a long association with Kent-based club Corinthian, where his roles included team manager, director of football and groundsman.
