= Damian Irvine =

Australian businessman and sporting administrator (born 1974)

Damian J Irvine (born 25 May 1974, Sydney) is an Australian businessman and sporting administrator.

== Early life ==
Irvine was born in Sutherland, southern Sydney, and attended Yarrawarra school, where he began a life-long affiliation with the Cronulla Sharks.

He relocated to Bathurst for his formative years, attending Kelso Public and the Scots School, Bathurst, where he represented in hockey, football, rugby, and diving.

He played football with the renowned Bathurst 75 football club and was a member of the 1992 dual first and reserve grade NSW football title-winning teams.

In 1993, Irvine joined Northern Suburbs Rugby and relocated to Sydney.

== Business career ==
In 1993, Irvine joined the pre-opening team at The Observatory Hotel, part of the sea containers and Venice-Simplon Group as concierge.

In 1995, he was awarded the Premiers Service Award by Bob Carr for services to the hospitality industry before training in fashion and design and taking over Skindeep Clothing, a small tailoring and fashion business in Sydney, in 1996.

Under his guidance Skindeep Clothing became a multi-site men's fashion company specialising in custom-made suiting and costume production and design for locally produced and shot films such as The Matrix, Superman Returns, The Hard Word, Dirty Deeds, numerous television series and music concept and design work with acts such as Silverchair, Looking Through a Glass Onion for John Waters and Human Nature and the Bell Shakespeare Company.

During his time as director of Skindeep Clothing, Damian lectured and mentored students at Sydney's renowned Fashion Design Studio at East Sydney College of TAFE.

His life-long support of the Cronulla Sharks saw Skindeep become long-term sponsors of the club from 1997.

Irvine took up an interest in Thoroughbred racing and breeding in 1996.

In 1997, Irvine founded the Acquiesce Group, a consultancy company.

== Music ==
In 2020, project band Socata recorded and released two singles that Irvine wrote and produced demo tracks for in 1994. Socata members are Irvine, R.E.M and The Posies guitarist Ken Stringfellow and The Posies Drummer Frankie Seragusa. The tracks "Fine and Dando" and "Nice Thing" were released during lockdown for the Covid pandemic.

== Sports administration ==
=== Cronulla Sharks ===
In 2009, Irvine became chairman of the Cronulla Sharks NRL club when the club's financial position was listed as critical and media and brand damage around player behaviour and poor governance by the CEO, chairman and head coach attracted huge media interest in the failing club's future viability. A new board was appointed by Irvine and along with his financial director Craig Douglas and Keith Ward, Irvine won the support of the club's financiers St.George Bank to trade the club out of the large debt and year on year losses the previous directors had accrued. Irvine's commitment and commercial expertise attracted much-needed sponsorship and revenue to the club.

On 26 August 2012, Irvine's strategy of leveraging the club's property assets and savvy business management of the club delivered a property deal that cleared the club's debt and positioned the Sharks as a financial force for future generations.

In March 2013, Irvine stood down from his position as Club Chairman on learning of questionable duty of care and ethical practices applied by head coach Shane Flanagan and his staff. The decision by Irvine and his board to sack key management staff and suspend Flanagan on learning of their breaches of protocol and ASADA and WADA rules in 2011 was unpopular at the time and was made three days before the season opening match against the Gold Coast Titans, but was proven to be prudent and correct when long investigations by the NRL and government agencies subsequently suspended Flanagan from the sport for twelve months and sanctioned the other staff involved.

=== Notts County FC ===
In early 2014, Irvine was approached to change codes and join English Football League club Notts County F.C. with the club facing relegation and nine points from safety.

He successfully restructured the club and was awarded the Best Club Marketing Award at the Football Business Awards 2014.

Notts County under manager Shaun Derry performed a "Great Escape" retaining their league 1 status on the final day of the season away at Oldham.

=== Wycombe Wanderers FC ===
Irvine joined Wycombe Wanderers FC in 2015 and was heralded as "the club's most significant and important signing on or off-field in recent memory" by then-Chairman Andrew Howard. Wycombe Wanderers were in a difficult period, having been taken over by a supporters trust after a period of financial instability. Irvine delivered significant commercial partnerships including the first major EFL kit sponsorship deal with O'Neills, a major shirt sponsorship with Utilita Energy, kit sponsorships with Cherry Red Records and Origin Global, extensions with Beechdean Icecreams, and other community and medical partnerships with BMI Healthcare and Wycombe Leisure Centre.

It was announced in February 2018 that Irvine was departing Wycombe after completing the club's five-year plan for commercial restructuring and growth, and the on-field target of Gareth Ainsworth's team achieving promotion to League 1 of the EFL.

=== Bradford Bulls RLFC ===
In 2016, Irvine was linked with the Bradford Bulls Rugby League Club as a potential director. After an administration period Irvine was brought to Bradford by the RFL to assist the new ownership set up a competitive structure. Irvine joined the club full-time in March 2018 leading into the season which saw Bradford Bulls promoted back in the RFL Championship.

=== Bradford (Park Avenue) FC ===
In October 2018, after an initial due diligence period, Irvine was installed to oversee the National League North Football club Bradford (Park Avenue) as part of a partnership between the Bradford Bulls and Bradford (Park Avenue). that would investigate the potential of a multi-sport merger club .

It was reported by the organisations that Irvine's "Vast Experience" in both Football and Rugby would benefit the organisation. At the time Bradford (Park Avenue) owner Gareth Roberts had advised supporters that he could, or would, no longer fund the large year on year losses the club was incurring, and that he needed a new strategy and direction for the club in order to make it sustainable.

Irvine announced new sponsorships with Utilita and the University of Bradford and appointed Player Manager Garry Thompson in a comprehensive restructure. It was also announced that new relationships with Upper Tier Clubs would be pivotal to the future of the club.

Manager Mark Bower credited Irvine with providing long overdue experience and improvement to the club.

It was reported that Irvine's influence attracted notable loan signings to assist the club reach the playoffs including the signatures of Keane Lewis-Potter and Charlie Andrew from Hull City FC

In late July 2019, Irvine left Bradford (Park Avenue) having ended his consultancy period with the club. It was reported that his brief on arrival was " To turn around Avenue's finances and it is understood the club is now in a more sustainable position".

=== Hunslet RLFC ===
In November 2019, Irvine was appointed as a director of Hunslet Rugby League Club with the club experiencing a period of financial hardship and having been placed in special measures by the sports governing body The RFL.

The club was subsequently released from special measures in late 2019 and the outstanding debt of £30,000 cleared. A strong period of player recruitment by Head Coach Gary Thornton saw Hunslet remain undefeated in the pre-season and progressing in the Rugby League Challenge Cup after a comprehensive first round proper victory against Coventry Bears.

In February 2020, it was reported the club would remain in full supporter ownership due to the re-established stability and financial performance.

In 2024 the club were promoted after winning the promotion final against Swinton lions to return to the championship for the first time in 10 years.

=== Ebbsfleet United FC ===
In February 2020, Irvine was appointed CEO of Ebbsfleet United FC with the club under financial strain and in disarray facing relegation from the National League. Ebbsfleet were under a transfer embargo for unpaid HMRC debts, and were on a losing streak under manager Kevin Watson having been dumped out of the FA cup at home by lower league Royston Town. The club was relegated after the season was terminated due to the COVID-19 pandemic. Irvine held an extensive search for a new manager to replace Kevin Watson and appointed Dennis Kutrieb in May 2020

During the 2020–2021 and 2021–2022 seasons, Irvine guided Ebbsfleet through a restructure and turnaround period, helping, with Kutrieb, establish a reputation for entertaining and pure football. Ground, food and beverage, and commercial upgrades were made and, in April 2023, the club returned to the National Division as champions, equalling the divisional record of 103 points for the season, scoring over 100 goals and winning the league by a record points margin. Three years later, the club faced another crisis, and a delayed start to the 2026–2027 season, while new owner John O'Leary completed a takeover.
