= List of Ebbsfleet United F.C. seasons =

Ebbsfleet United Football Club is an English association football club based in Northfleet, Kent. The team compete in the National League, the fifth level of the English football league system as of the 2023–24 season.

== History ==
Founded in 1946 from the merger of Gravesend United and Northfleet United, they were known as Gravesend & Northfleet until changing to their current name in 2007. Gravesend & Northfleet started in the Southern League, which they won in the 1957–58 season. In 1974–75, they were promoted to the Southern League Premier Division before becoming founding members of the Alliance Premier League ahead of the 1979–80 season. They rejoined the Southern League in 1982. Ahead of the 1997–98 season, they joined the Isthmian League. They won the league in 2001–02 to again reach the top level of the non-League system. After having changed their name to Ebbsfleet United in 2007, they won the FA Trophy in 2007–08. They were relegated to the Conference South in 2010, but would return immediately, before being relegated again in 2012–13. After two unsuccessful play-off attempts, Ebbsfleet were successful at the third, defeating Chelmsford City in the play-off final. In their first season back in the fifth tier, Ebbsfleet reached the play-offs but were unsuccessful. They were relegated back to the National League South in 2019–20, before returning to the re-named National League as champions in 2022–23.

== Seasons ==
Season	League											FA Cup	FA Trophy	Kent Senior Cup	Other Cups	Notes
Season	Level	Division	P	W	D	L	F	A	GD	Pts	Pos	FA Cup	FA Trophy	Kent Senior Cup	Other Cups	Notes
1946–47	5	Southern League	32	17	4	11	82	58	+24	38	6th	1R	—N/a	No data	SLC: ?	First season after GUFC and NUFC merged
1947–48	5	Southern League	34	11	6	17	52	81	−29	28	13th	2Q	—N/a	F	SLC: ?	
1948–49	5	Southern League	42	20	9	13	60	46	+14	49	7th	3Q	—N/a	W	SLC: ?	
1949–50	5	Southern League	46	16	9	21	88	81	+7	41	15th	1R	—N/a	No data	SLC: ?	
1950–51	5	Southern League	44	12	14	18	65	83	−18	38	18th	1Q	—N/a	No data	SLC: ?	
1951–52	5	Southern League	42	12	7	23	68	88	−20	31	21st	1Q	—N/a	No data	SLC: ?	
1952–53	5	Southern League	42	19	7	16	83	76	+7	45	9th	4Q	—N/a	W	SLC: ?	
1953–54	5	Southern League	42	16	8	18	76	77	−1	40	15th	Pre	—N/a	No data	SLC: ?	
1954–55	5	Southern League	42	9	9	24	62	98	−36	27	22nd	1Q	—N/a	No data	SLC: ?	
1955–56	5	Southern League	42	17	8	17	79	75	+4	42	12th	1Q	—N/a	No data	SLC: ?	
1956–57	5	Southern League	42	21	11	10	74	58	+16	53	5th	2Q	—N/a	No data	SLC: ?	
1957–58	5	Southern League	42	27	5	10	109	71	+38	59	1st	4Q	—N/a	No data	SLC: F	
1958–59	5	Southern South-East	32	21	2	9	79	54	+25	44	2nd	4Q	—N/a	No data	SLC: ?	
1959–60	5	Southern Premier	42	14	8	20	71	87	−16	36	17th	4Q	—N/a	No data	SLC: ?	
1960–61	5	Southern Premier	42	15	7	20	75	101	−26	37	18th	1Q	—N/a	No data	SLC: ?	
1961–62	5	Southern Premier	42	17	4	21	59	92	−33	38	14th	1Q	—N/a	No data	SLC: ?	
1962–63	5	Southern Premier	40	10	3	27	62	91	−29	23	20th	4R	—N/a	No data	SLC: ?	Best FA Cup run to date
1963–64	6	Southern League Division 1	42	7	9	26	43	96	−53	23	20th	2R	—N/a	No data	SLC: ?	
1964–65	6	Southern League Division 1	42	9	7	26	57	101	−44	25	21st	1R	—N/a	No data	SLC: ?	
1965–66	6	Southern League Division 1	46	16	9	21	84	86	−2	41	17th	1R	—N/a	No data	SLC: ?	
1966–67	6	Southern League Division 1	46	11	9	26	63	106	−43	31	21st	4Q	—N/a	No data	SLC: ?	
1967–68	6	Southern League Division 1	42	6	7	29	28	112	−84	19	22nd	1Q	—N/a	No data	SLC: ?	
1968–69	6	Southern League Division 1	42	8	9	25	51	79	−28	25	21st	1Q	—N/a	No data	SLC: ?	
1969–70	6	Southern League Division 1	42	13	11	18	62	71	−9	37	16th	1Q	2R	No data	SLC: ?	
1970–71	6	Southern League Division 1	38	19	10	9	74	42	+32	48	3rd	2Q	3Q	No data	SLC: ?	
1971–72	5	Southern Premier	42	5	6	31	30	110	−80	16	22nd	1Q	3Q	No data	SLC: ?	
1972–73	6	Southern League Division 1	42	22	7	13	81	55	+26	51	6th	1Q	1R	No data	SLC: ?	
1973–74	6	Southern League Division 1	38	13	13	12	58	52	+6	39	10th	2Q	3Q	No data	SLC: ?	
1974–75	6	Southern League Division 1	38	24	12	2	70	30	+40	60	1st	1Q	3Q	No data	SLC: ?	
1975–76	5	Southern Premier	42	16	18	8	49	47	+2	50	6th	1Q	3Q	No data	SLC: ?	
1976–77	5	Southern Premier	42	13	13	16	38	43	−5	39	11th	1Q	1Q	F	SLC: ?	
1977–78	5	Southern Premier	42	19	11	12	57	42	+15	49	5th	2Q	2R	No data	SLC: W	
1978–79	5	Southern Premier	42	15	12	15	56	55	+1	42	12th	1R	3Q	No data	SLC: ?	
1979–80	5	Alliance Premier League	38	17	10	11	49	44	+5	44	5th	1R	2Q	No data	CLC: ?	Highest ranked position in English league system (97th)
1980–81	5	Alliance Premier League	38	13	8	17	48	55	−7	34	15th	1R	1R	W	CLC: ?	
1981–82	5	Alliance Premier League	42	10	10	22	51	69	−18	40	20th	4Q	3Q	No data	CLC: ?	
1982–83	6	Southern Premier	38	14	12	12	49	50	−1	54	10th	4Q	3Q	No data	SLC: ?	
1983–84	6	Southern Premier	38	18	9	11	50	38	+12	63	4th	3Q	2Q	No data	SLC: ?	
1984–85	6	Southern Premier	38	12	12	14	46	46	0	48	13th	2Q	3Q	No data	SLC: ?	
1985–86	6	Southern Premier	38	9	9	20	29	55	−26	36	20th	3Q	1Q	No data	SLC: ?	
1986–87	7	Southern League Division 1 S	38	18	7	13	67	46	+21	61	6th	1Q	1Q	No data	SLC: ?	Lowest ranked position in English league system (142nd)
1987–88	7	Southern League Division 1 S	40	20	12	8	60	32	+28	72	4th	3Q	2Q	No data	SLC: ?	
1988–89	7	Southern League Division 1 S	42	27	6	9	70	40	+30	87	2nd	1Q	3R	No data	SLC: ?	
1989–90	6	Southern Premier	42	18	12	12	44	50	−6	66	7th	QR3	R1	No data	SLC: ?	
1990–91	6	Southern Premier	42	9	7	26	46	91	−45	34	21st	QR1	R1	F	SLC: ?	
1991–92	6	Southern Premier	42	8	9	25	39	87	−48	33	22nd	QR4	QR3	No data	SLC: ?	
1992–93	7	Southern League Division 1 S	42	25	4	13	99	63	+36	79	4th	QR1	QR2	No data	SLC: ?	
1993–94	7	Southern League Division 1 S	42	27	11	4	87	24	+63	92	1st	R1	QR2	No data	SLC: ?	
1994–95	6	Southern Premier	42	13	13	16	38	55	−17	52	14th	QR3	QR2	No data	SLC: ?	
1995–96	6	Southern Premier	42	15	10	17	60	62	−2	55	11th	R3	QR2	No data	SLC: ?	
1996–97	6	Southern Premier	42	16	7	19	63	73	−10	55	14th	QR1	QR1	No data	SLC: ?	
1997–98	6	Isthmian Premier	42	15	8	19	65	67	−2	53	13th	QR1	QR2	No data	ILC: R2	Switched to Isthmian League
1998–99	6	Isthmian Premier	42	18	6	18	54	53	+1	60	10th	QR3	R2	No data	ILC: R2	
1999–2000	6	Isthmian Premier	42	15	10	17	66	67	−1	55	11th	QR2	R3	W	ILC: R1	
2000–01	6	Isthmian Premier	42	22	5	15	63	46	+17	71	6th	R1	R1	W	ILC: R2	
2001–02	6	Isthmian Premier	42	31	6	5	90	33	+57	99	1st	R1	R5	W	ILC: R3	
2002–03	5	Football Conference	42	12	12	18	62	73	−11	48	17th	QR4	R3	No data	—N/a	
2003–04	5	Football Conference	42	14	15	13	69	66	+3	57	11th	R2	R3	No data	—N/a	
2004–05	5	Conference National	42	13	11	18	58	64	−6	50	14th	QR4	QF	No data	CLC: R3	
2005–06	5	Conference National	42	13	10	19	45	57	−12	49	16th	QR4	R2	F	—N/a	
2006–07	5	Conference National	46	21	11	14	63	56	+7	74	7th	QR4	QF		—N/a	
2007–08	5	Conference Premier	46	19	12	15	65	61	+4	69	11th	QR4	W	W	CLC: R5	Renamed Ebbsfleet United
2008–09	5	Conference Premier	46	16	10	20	52	60	−8	58	14th	R1	SF	No data	CLC: SF	MyFootballClub takeover
2009–10	5	Conference Premier	44	12	8	24	50	82	−32	44	22nd	QR4	R1	No data	—N/a	
2010–11	6	Conference South	42	22	12	8	75	51	+24	78	3rd (Note: Won in Playoff final)	R1	R2	No data	—N/a	
2011–12	5	Conference Premier	46	14	12	20	69	84	−15	54	14th	QR4	R3	No data	—N/a	
2012–13	5	Conference Premier	46	8	15	23	55	89	−34	39	23rd	R1	R1	No data	—N/a	
2013–14	6	Conference South	42	21	11	10	67	40	+27	74	4th (Note: Lost in Playoff semifinal)	QR4	R3	W	—N/a	
2014–15	6	Conference South	40	17	9	14	60	41	+19	60	8th	QR3	QF	2R	—N/a	
2015–16	6	National League South	42	24	12	6	60	41	+36	73	2nd (Note: Lost in Playoff final)	QR2	R1	SF	—N/a	
2016–17	6	National League South	42	29	9	4	96	30	+66	96	2nd	QR4	R2	R2	—N/a	
2017–18	5	National League	46	19	17	10	64	50	+14	74	6th	R1	R2	R2	—N/a	
2018–19	5	National League	46	18	13	15	64	50	+14	67	8th	R1	R1	QF	—N/a	
2019–20	5	National League	39	10	12	17	47	68	−21	42	22nd	R1	R3	R2	—N/a	Finished 21st, relegated in 22nd place on points per game
2020–21	6	National League South	18	8	4	6	26	24	+2	28	7th	QR3	R3	—N/a	—N/a	League was declared null and void on 18 February 2021.
2021–22	6	National League South	40	24	4	12	78	53	+25	76	3rd	R1	R2	QF	—N/a	
2022–23	6	National League South	46	32	7	7	110	47	+63	103	1st	R2	R2		—N/a	
2023–24	5	National League	46	14	12	20	59	74	−15	54	19th	QR4	R3		—N/a	
2024–25	5	National League	46	3	13	30	38	98	−60	22	24th	QR4	R3	F	NLC: GS	
2025–26	6	National League South	46	22	11	13	73	54	+19	77	9th	R1	R4	SF	—N/a	

Champions	Runners-up	Promoted	Relegated
