= Ebbsfleet United F.C. =

Association football club in Northfleet, England

Coordinates: 51.44943°N 0.322369°E

Ebbsfleet United
- Full name: Ebbsfleet United Football Club
- Nickname: The Fleet
- Founded: 1946; 80 years ago (as Gravesend & Northfleet)
- Ground: Stonebridge Road, Northfleet
- Capacity: 4,769 (2,179 seats)
- Manager: Josh Wright
- League: National League South
- 2025–26: National League South, 9th of 24
- Website: ebbsfleetunited.co.uk
Home colours	Away colours

Ebbsfleet United Football Club is a professional association football club based in Northfleet, Kent, England. The club compete in the National League South, the sixth level of the English football league system.

Founded in 1946 from the merger between Gravesend United and Northfleet United, they were known as Gravesend & Northfleet until changing to their current name in 2007.

Between 2008 and 2013, the club was 75% owned by the web-based venture MyFootballClub whose members, by majority vote, decided on how the club was managed. In May 2013, KEH Sports Ltd, a group of Kuwaiti investors, became owners of the club. In August 2026, the club announced John O'Leary as its new owner during a month-long suspension by the National League.

== History ==
=== 1946–2007: Gravesend & Northfleet ===
Gravesend & Northfleet F.C. was formed in 1946 by a merger between Gravesend United (originally formed in 1893) and Northfleet United (originally formed in 1890). The new club retained the red and white home colours and the Stonebridge Road stadium of Northfleet United.

The club were elected to the Southern League for the 1946–47 season and, in the inaugural season, reached the first round proper of the FA Cup, losing to fellow Southern League club Gillingham. The club reached the first round of the FA cup again in 1949–50, before being defeated by Torquay United of the Football League Third Division South. For eight seasons, the club recorded mid-table finishes in the single division Southern League (a highest of fifth in 1947 and a lowest of twenty-first in 1952) until finishing bottom of the division over the 1954–55 season. During that period, "The Fleet" twice won the Kent Senior Cup: in 1949 they defeated Gillingham 2–0 in a twice-replayed final and, in 1953, were victors 2–1 over Dartford.

Following the dismal record over the previous season, in the summer of 1955 the club appointed ex-Arsenal and England player Lionel Smith as manager, their seventh manager in ten seasons. He remained in charge for five seasons until resigning in 1960. Three seasons into Smith's tenure, Gravesend & Northfleet were the 1957–58 Southern League Champions. During the following season, the league operated two parallel regional divisions and, by achieving a second-placed finish in the South-East Division, the club earned a position in the league's newly formed Premier Division for the 1959–60 season.

For three seasons, the club recorded lowly finishing positions in the division before being relegated to the Southern League Division One after the 1962–63 season. In 1961 and 1962, whilst still members of the Premier Division, the club applied for election to the Football League Fourth Division but failed to receive a single vote on each occasion. In the relegation season, "The Fleet" achieved their longest-ever FA Cup run in the 1962–63 season competition: after beating League Division Four strugglers Exeter City, and then mid-table Isthmian League club Wycombe Wanderers at Stonebridge Road in the first two rounds, in the third round the club won away at Carlisle United of the Football League Third Division before they were knocked out in a fourth round replay at leading Football League Second Division club Sunderland – that was the first of a sequence of four seasons of appearing in the proper rounds of the FA cup. The subsequent three were: in 1963–64 losing in the second round to Brentford of the Third Division, in the following season losing in the first round to another Third Division club Bournemouth & Boscombe Athletic, and then beaten in the first round by Wimbledon of the Southern League.

Shortly after the relegation, the club was rocked by a financial crisis which saw an exodus of key players in October 1963 and, in April 1964, the supporters club made key donations to avert the threat of the club folding. In the 1963–64 season, "The Fleet" slumped to twentieth position (from twenty-two clubs) of the Southern League Division One, and recorded similar lowly finishes over the following six seasons. During that spell, in November 1968, the club appointed Alf Ackerman as manager. In 1970, in the final season of the six-season run, the club won the Kent Floodlit Cup, defeating Margate 2–1 in a final replay, having shared six goals over the initial two-legged final tie. In 1971, the club achieved a third-place finish in Division One and were promoted back to the Southern League Premier Division. During the period between 1969 and 1971, Roy Hodgson, who later became manager of the national teams of Switzerland, United Arab Emirates, Finland and England, was a player at the club, making 59 appearances.

The club's return to the Premier Division for the 1971–72 season was unsatisfactory: they recorded all-time lows of five matches won and thirty goals scored. They finished at the foot of the table and were duly relegated into the now-regional Southern League Division One South. In February 1974, Ackerman quit as manager, citing lack of funds, and was replaced as manager by former player Tony Sitford. Fifteen months later, under Sitford, Gravesend & Northfleet were the 1974–75 Division One South champions and were again promoted to the Premier Division. Three seasons later, in 1978, "The Fleet" won the Southern League Cup defeating Weymouth 2–0 over a two-legged final. The club appeared in the first round of the FA Cup for each of the three seasons between 1978 and 1980, being defeated in the first two occasions by members of the Football League Fourth Division and previous cup conquerors: Wimbledon in an away replay in 1978 and in the following 1979–80 competition by Torquay United; and in 1980 defeated at home by non-league Isthmian League Division One St Albans City.

There was a reorganisation of Non-league football in 1979 and Gravesend & Northfleet were one of thirteen clubs from the Southern League Premier Division who together with seven clubs from the Northern Premier League were founder members of the countrywide Alliance Premier League. After a disappointing first half of the 1980–81 season, with the club in lower mid-table, manager Sitford was sacked in December 1980 and replaced by former Gillingham and Wimbledon defender Dave Galvin. 'The Fleet' not only maintained their league status that season but also won the 1981 Kent Senior Cup defeating Ashford Town 2–0 in the final. However, after the following 1981–82 campaign, in which Galvin resigned mid-season they were relegated back into the Southern League Premier Division

In the autumn of 1982, the club again reported financial losses and made cutbacks, the club manager of nine months Stan Harland and the chairman of the board both resigned. In 1988 there was a further crisis: the club was £58,000 in debt and close to financial collapse; the situation was alleviated when club landlords and local employer Blue Circle Industries intervened with a five-year deal worth £90,000. During the fifteen seasons between 1982 and 1997 Gravesend & Northfleet bounced between the Premier and South Divisions of the Southern League: there were relegations in both 1986 and 1992 (the club should have been relegated in 1991 however they were spared as Rushden Town were demoted owing to ground problems); these were followed by two promotions, firstly in 1989 under manager Denis Moore and then in 1994 led by manager Garry Aldous. There were two notable FA Cup runs during the period: in the 1993–94 season the club were defeated 2–1 at Football League Second Division club Leyton Orient; two seasons later in the 1995–96 competition after triumphing at home over newly restored Division Three club Colchester United and then Southern League South Division members Cinderford Town in a replay, 'the Fleet' played their highest ever ranked FA Cup opponent when they were beaten in the third round 3–0 by Premier League members Aston Villa, a tie in which the club ceded home advantage to maximise its revenue.

For the 1997–98 season, Gravesend & Northfleet left the Southern League and switched to what they believed to be the more geographically suitable Isthmian League Premier Division. After a poor start to the season, in September 1997 the club appointed their third manager in just over a year when they replaced player-manager Steve Lovell with their former youth team and assistant manager and ex-Gillingham forward Andy Ford. Under him 'the Fleet' played in the Isthmian League until 2001–02, the season in which they won the league championship and earned promotion into the Football Conference (formerly named the Alliance Premier League). That promotion season was the third of consecutive season wins in the Kent Senior Cup (the club's forerunner Northfleet United had achieved this and more, recording five consecutive wins in the 1920s): in the 1999–2000 final Folkestone Invicta were defeated 3–0; Dover Athletic were defeated 4–0 in the 2000–01 final; and beating Margate 5–0 in the 2001–02 final completed the trio of wins. There were too three consecutive seasons of appearing in the proper rounds of the FA Cup facing Football League Second Division clubs: on two occasions the club were defeated by Notts County, in round one in the 2000–01 season and in round two in the 2002–03 competition; in the intervening 2001–02 season they were defeated by Huddersfield Town in a round one tie.

In 2005, there was a change of manager: Andy Ford resigned in January 2005 and was replaced the following month by former Cambridge United, Birmingham City and Coventry City defender Liam Daish. A club player milestone occurred on 28 September 2005 when veteran Jimmy Jackson, who first played for 'the Fleet' in 1994, recorded his 500th game for the club

For the remaining seasons that the club was known as Gravesend & Northfleet it maintained its position in the Football Conference, the leading non-league competition. In May 2007 the club renamed itself Ebbsfleet United (cited as being for strategic reasons associated with the growth of the region and the establishment of Ebbsfleet Station as an international gateway).

=== 2007–present: Ebbsfleet United ===
==== 2007–2013: MyFootballClub ownership ====
Shortly after the name change to Ebbsfleet United, on 13 November 2007 website community MyFootballClub (MyFC) agreed to take control of Ebbsfleet United. MyFC had 28,250 members (each paying a subscription of £35) and paid £625,000 to purchase a 75% stake in the club with each member owning an equal share in the club on which no profit nor dividend was earned. Between 16 and 23 January 2008, a majority of MyFC members voted to both proceed with the takeover (95.89% voting "Yes") and to allow Liam Daish to continue with his plans for the January transfer window (95.86% voting "Yes"). The deal was ratified at an Extraordinary General Meeting of the club's board on 19 February 2008. Members had a vote on all major club decisions including transfers and player selection. Because of the nature of MyFC, Liam Daish, who had been titled manager since 2005, became instead the first team head coach – his backroom staff remained at the club.

Success quickly followed. On 10 May 2008 Ebbsfleet United won the FA Trophy, defeating now non-league Torquay United 1–0 in the final, a match watched by 40,000 spectators on the club's first trip to Wembley – becoming the first Kentish team to win this trophy. A couple of months later 'the Fleet' added further silverware when, in a delayed final played on 26 July 2008, they won the 2007–08 Kent Senior Cup with a 4–0 victory over Cray Wanderers. During the following 2008–09 FA Cup competition the club featured once again in the first round, losing 1–0 away at EFL League One club Crewe Alexandra.

After the first year of MyFC ownership, a majority of its members failed to renew their annual subscription and membership dropped from a peak of 32,000 at the time of the takeover to just over 9,000 on deadline day 2009; the club had previously stated that 15,000 members was the minimum needed. As a result of budget cuts, in June 2009, the club parted company after four years with assistant manager Alan Kimble. Due to its reduced playing strength, the club finished the 2009–10 Football Conference in penultimate position in the table and were relegated into the Conference South.

MyFC membership continued to decline. In September 2010, two and a half years after the takeover, there were around 3,500 members. In an October 2010 vote among MyFC members the previous decision to allow the team manager autonomy in transfer dealings was rescinded, by a majority of 35 on a total vote of 132 in favour of the membership having a 48-hour period to ratify any proposed player signing or sale; both the manager and the club secretary opposed the change. Manager Daish rebuilt the squad following the previous season's relegation and on 15 May 2011, after one season in the Conference South, Ebbsfleet United won the 2010–11 season play-off final, beating Farnborough 4–2 and were thus promoted back to the Conference Premier. During the season, in the first round of the FA Cup, the club were defeated 3–2 in a home replay by Conference Premier promotion contenders AFC Wimbledon (the spiritual heirs of the club that had beaten them twice previously in the proper rounds of the competition).

Ebbsfleet United's financial difficulties grew. In December 2011 it was announced that, to survive, the club needed to generate £50,000 by the end of the 2011–12 season and it appealed for investment. The club completed the season, finishing in mid-table. Prior to the 2012–13 season, the MyFC membership dropped to around 1,300; in November 2012, the independent Fleet Supporters Trust, who had continued making financial donations to the club, stated they were concerned about the viability and sustainability of the football club under its present ownership and called on the MyFC members to consider their continued ownership of the football club. On 23 April 2013 it was announced that MyFC's members had voted to relinquish their 75% ownership of the club and to pass two-thirds of their shares to the club's supporters' trust, the Fleet Trust, and the remaining third to one of the club's major shareholders (believed to be former club chairman Phil Sonsara). It was further disclosed that the club needed to additionally raise £100,000 by the end of the month in order to avoid entering administration. This deal was not completed: the MyFC and other shareholders subsequently accepted an offer for all the shares of the club from KEH Sports Ltd, a group of Kuwaiti investors. On-field there was a first round FA Cup defeat at Carlisle United of League One, but the greater setback was the relegation suffered by 'the Fleet' at the end of the 2012–13 season, back to the Conference South.

==== 2013–2026: Kuwaiti ownership ====
KEH Sports Ltd, a group of Kuwaiti investors completed a take-over of Ebbsfleet United in May 2013 with 96.24% of voting MyFC members in favour of the transaction. The new investors reportedly paid MyFC £7,500 for their 75% of the shares with a further £2,500 paid for the remainder to other shareholders. Further, £558,000 of loans (£139,000 to MyFC, the balance to directors, shareholders and other parties) were settled at 10% of their value and £100,000 made available for other creditors. The new owners appointed KEH director Abdulla Al-Humaidi as the new chairman and announced that the club would have a transfer budget of £100,000 for the coming season and a minimum playing squad budget of £8,000 per week. Liam Daish subsequently departed as head coach after eight seasons in charge – the longest tenure of any Fleet manager. The new owners appointed the Dover Athletic coach and former Charlton Athletic defender Steve Brown as manager.

A long-standing club record was broken just before Christmas as Brown's team achieved nine wins in succession after a 2–0 win over Sutton United, with both goals coming from Billy Bricknell. The win put them among the title contenders but poor runs of form followed. Ebbsfleet eventually reached the play-offs, helped by goalkeeper Preston Edwards keeping 11 clean sheets at Stonebridge Road during the season. The play-off semi-final first leg against Bromley at Stonebridge Road ended in a 4–0 win for the Fleet; Bromley won the second leg, but Ebbsfleet won 4–1 on aggregate. The play-off final was against Dover Athletic at Stonebridge Road, in front of a 4,200 crowd. Dover dominated and won 1–0 with a goal early in the second half from former Ebbsfleet striker Nathan Elder.

The 2014–15 season started promisingly, with wins against Concord Rangers and Havant & Waterlooville. However, the season failed to live up to expectations and Steve Brown was sacked after a 3–0 home defeat to Gosport Borough in November 2014. Jamie Day replaced Brown and, despite taking the club to the FA Trophy quarter-finals, where they lost to eventual winners North Ferriby United, he was sacked in April 2015. In the summer of 2015, former club captain Daryl McMahon was named as permanent manager. The 2015–16 season was more fruitful for the Fleet, as they led the league for almost the whole season. However, title rivals Sutton United went on a 26-game unbeaten run and clinched the league title by beating the Fleet 2–0 at Gander Green Lane. In the play-off semi-finals the Fleet edged past Whitehawk via a penalty shootout after a 3–3 draw on aggregate but lost on penalties in the final to rivals Maidstone United. In the 2016–17 season Ebbsfleet again missed out on first place, this time to National League South champions Maidenhead United, but they gained promotion to the National League with a 2–1 win at Stonebridge Road in the play-off final over Chelmsford City. The following season the team achieved their highest ever league finish of 6th, beating Aldershot Town in the play-off qualifying round 5–4 on penalties. A heavy 4–2 defeat in the next round to Tranmere Rovers consigned Ebbsfleet to another season in the National League.

The 2018–19 campaign was disappointing. Daryl McMahon left the club in November and was succeeded by former Woking manager Garry Hill. Despite an initial renaissance, the Fleet missed out on the play-offs following a winless April. Early 2019 was marred by pay dispute between the club and its players. On 1 February, the Ebbsfleet players claimed they had only been paid on time once in the preceding 12 months, that they had unknowingly played matches earlier in the season without the right medical insurance in place, and that pension payments had not been met. In response, the players refused to warm-up before a match against Wrexham. In April 2019, the club blamed the late payments on compliance procedures relating to transactions from Kuwait. In May 2019, Ebbsfleet United players and fans protested against unpaid wages at Stonebridge Road. At the end of the 2018-19 season, Ebbsfleet allowed many contracted players to leave on a free transfer following the pay dispute.

The 2019–20 season started with the Fleet losing their first five matches. In October 2019, Garry Hill left the club after just two wins in the opening 16 games of the season. Assistant Kevin Watson was appointed to the role on an interim basis before signing a seven-month contract to the end of the season. In February 2020 the owners, KEH Sports, appointed Damian Irvine as CEO oversee day-to-day operations and all football matters. It was announced on 18 May 2020 that Kevin Watson's short-term contract as manager would not be renewed and he would leave the club. The 2019–20 season was cancelled in March due to the COVID-19 pandemic with Ebbsfleet in the relegation places; on 17 June 2020 using the criterion of points per game, the club were relegated from the National League (by a difference of 0.002 points).

On 2 June 2020, Tennis Borussia Berlin manager Dennis Kutrieb was appointed as the new manager. Ebbsfleet achieved promotion back to the fifth tier in the 2022–23 season, clinching the title with four matches remaining, winning the league by 20 points. In January 2024 with the club struggling in the league, Kutrieb was sacked and later replaced by Danny Searle: under the new manager the club retained its league place by two points in the 2023–24 National League.

Off the field that season, on 23 December 2023, on the day he was declared bankrupt, Al-Humaidi resigned as chairman and as a director of Ebbsfleet United. He was replaced as chairman by his cousin Abdulla Al-Humaidi. On 9 September 2024, after seven straight National League match defeats, manager Danny Searle was sacked and replaced by Harry Watling and then, in December 2024, by Josh Wright. The club were relegated at the end of the 2024–25 season.

In August 2026, two days before the start of the 2026–27 season, the National League announced it had suspended the club's license over unpaid HMRC debts. During the month, Ebbsfleet's first six fixtures were postponed. In the process of bringing in new owners since August 2025, the club announced on 19 August 2026 that full ownership had passed to John O'Leary, and funds had been transferred to settle HMRC and football creditors. The club was given repeated deadlines to satisfy National League information requirements, and the suspension was finally lifted on 2 September 2026, but a player registration embargo remained, and the League imposed a suspended six-points deduction - to be activated if the club failed to comply with League rules.

== Club colours ==
Ebbsfleet's traditional home colours (adopted from forerunner club Northfleet United) are red shirt with white detailing, white shorts and red socks. Away colours have varied, with blue and white stripes favoured in the late eighties before colour combinations such as white/black and yellow/navy or black were used. MyFC members chose white with red detailing as the away colour in 2008–09, but a clash with the home colours of Woking and other clubs was not spotted until after the kit had been supplied, so a third shirt with green body and white sleeves was used with the white shorts and socks; for the 2010–11 season the members made the unusual choice of purple for the away kit.

The club used specially designed 75th anniversary kits for the 2021–22 season: the home shirt was red and the away shirt green both with the Gravesend & Northfleet badge and lettering included on the shirts which additionally featured subtle design cues that paid homage to forerunner clubs Northfleet United and Gravesend United respectively

== Stadium ==
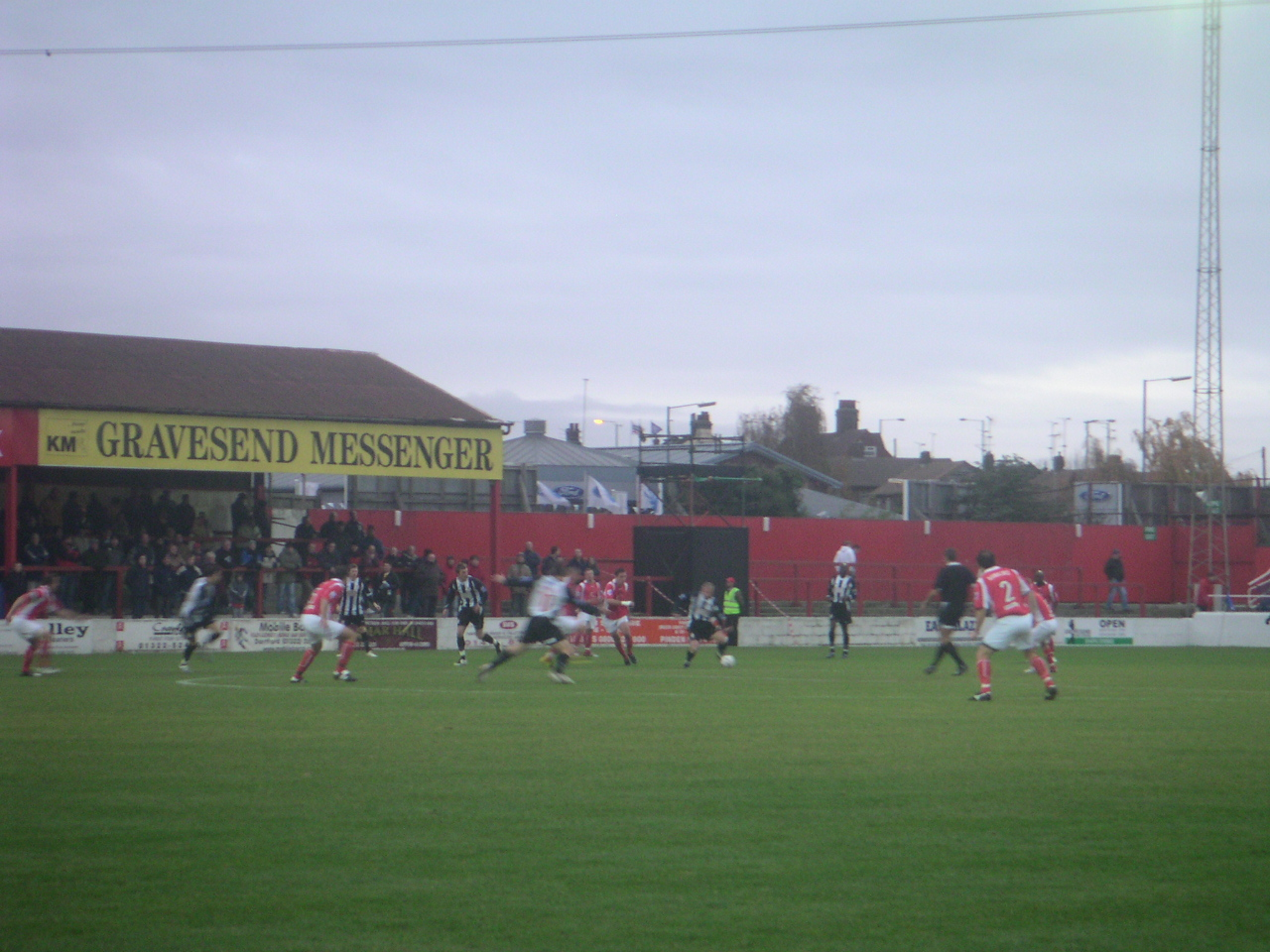
Ebbsfleet United v. Stafford Rangers at Stonebridge Road, November 2007

Since the club's inception, it has played its home matches at Stonebridge Road, which had been the home stadium of forerunner club Northfleet United since 1905. In 1953, it was the first football stadium in Kent to have floodlights installed.

In July 2012, the Stonebridge Road terrace was named the Liam Daish Stand in recognition of the then manager. The stand was demolished in 2016 and replaced with a new main stand in 2017.

In October 2017, Stonebridge Road became known as Kuflink Stadium as part of a five-year sponsorship deal.

In April 2024, plans were approved locally for a new 8,000-seat stadium in Northfleet as part of a wider £1.3 billion regeneration of the area. Work was scheduled to begin in September 2024, with completion aimed for August 2026. The proposed redevelopment would see the demolition of Stonebridge Road. However, the proposal was called in by the Ministry for Housing, Communities and Local Government in February 2025 and, in August 2026, following a public enquiry, planning permission for the development was refused over fears it might expose residents to "highly toxic lead poisoning".

== Club personnel ==
=== Club officials ===
Position	Staff
Chairman	TBC
Directors	TBC
Associate Directors	(England) John Copus
Associate Directors	(England) Sue Copus
Chief Executive	(Australia) Damian Irvine
Communications Manager	(England) Ed Miller

Source: Ebbsfleet United F.C.

=== Management team ===
Position	Staff
Manager	(England) Josh Wright
Assistant manager	(England) David Kerslake
Goalkeeping coach	(England) Kyri Neocleous
Strength & conditioning coach	(England) Kiah Froud
Sports therapist	(England) Bruno Silva
Club analyst	(England) Samuel Collyer

Source: Ebbsfleet United F.C.

=== Club staff ===
Position	Staff
Football Operations Manager / Club Secretary	Tracy Down
Chief Financial Officer	Adele Berrizbeitia
Events Co-ordinator	Cheryl Wanless
Club Operations Assistant	Meghan Love
Media manager	Katie Humphris
Communications, website & programme	Ed Miller
Maintenance	Simon Beagley

== Players ==
=== Current squad ===
As of 18 August 2026

Note: Flags indicate national team as defined under FIFA eligibility rules; some limited exceptions apply. Players may hold more than one non-FIFA nationality.

No.	Pos.	Nation	Player
1	GK	ENG	Will Buse
2	DF	ENG	Josh Passley
3	DF	ENG	Jake Vokins
4	MF	ENG	Jake Hessenthaler
5	DF	ENG	Camron Gbadebo
6	MF	ENG	James Vennings
7	FW	ENG	Daniel Ogunleye
8	MF	ENG	Toby Edser
9	FW	ENG	Aramide Oteh
10	FW	GHA	Kwesi Appiah
11	DF	ENG	Charlie Seaman

No.	Pos.	Nation	Player
12	DF	ENG	Ronny Nelson
14	FW	ENG	Dominic Samuel
15	DF	ENG	Will Tizzard
16	MF	ENG	Gene Kennedy
17	FW	ENG	Lennon Peake
18	FW	ENG	Olly Box
19	FW	ENG	Finlay Barnes
20	MF	ENG	Maxx Manktelow
22	MF	ENG	Ben Chapman
24	GK	ENG	Matt Hall
25	FW	ENG	Harvey Walker

== Records ==
=== Gravesend United F.C. ===
- Best FA Cup performance: Fifth qualifying round, 1898–99 (replay)

=== Northfleet United F.C. ===
- Best FA Cup performance: Second round, 1926–27, 1929–30

=== Gravesend & Northfleet F.C. ===
- Best FA Cup performance: Fourth round, 1962–63
- Best FA Trophy performance: Quarter-finals, 2004–05 (replay), 2006–07

=== Ebbsfleet United F.C. ===
- Best FA Cup performance: Second round, 2022–23
- Best FA Trophy performance: Winners, 2007–08

== Honours ==
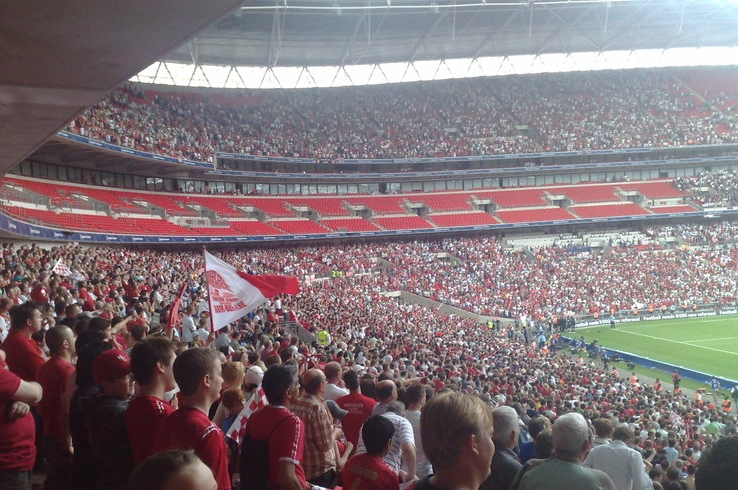
Part of the crowd at Wembley for the 2007–08 FA Trophy final in May 2008

League

- Southern League
  - Champions: 1957–58
- Southern League, Southern Division
  - Champions: 1974–75, 1993–94
- Conference South / National League South (level 6)
  - Champions: 2022–23
  - Play-off winners: 2011, 2017
- Isthmian League (level 6)
  - Champions: 2001–02

Cup

- FA Trophy
  - Winners: 2007–08
- Southern League Cup
  - Winners: 1977–78
- Southern League Championship Cup
  - Winners: 1978–79
- Kent Senior Cup
  - Winners (8): 1948–49, 1952–53, 1980–81, 1999–2000, 2000–01, 2001–02, 2007–08, 2013–14
- Kent Floodlight Cup
  - Winners: 1969–70

== See also ==
- List of Ebbsfleet United F.C. seasons
