= Michael Porter (rugby league) =

Australian rugby league footballer

Personal information
- Born: 25 March 1964 (age 61)

Playing information
- Position: Prop, Hooker
Club
Years	Team	Pld	T	G	FG	P
1984–94	Cronulla Sharks	154	11	0	0	44
1988–89	→Hull Kingston Rovers	29	5	0	0	20
	Total	183	16	0	0	64
- Father: Monty Porter

Michael Porter (born 25 March 1964) is an Australian former professional rugby league footballer who played for the Cronulla Sharks.

Porter is the son of premiership winning St. George second rower Monty Porter, who was Cronulla's inaugural captain in 1967.

A local junior from the Engadine Dragons, Porter debuted for Cronulla in 1984 and started out as a prop. He made 154 first-grade appearances for Cronulla, often featuring as a hooker, which included finals series in both 1988 and 1989.

In 1988/89 he spent a season in England with Hull Kingston Rovers.
