= Monty Porter =

Australian rugby league footballer and administrator (1935-2011)

Personal information
- Full name: Montague Porter
- Born: 27 April 1935 Peak Hill, New South Wales, Australia
- Died: 24 January 2011 (aged 76)

Playing information
- Position: Prop, Second-row
Club
Years	Team	Pld	T	G	FG	P
1955	Western Suburbs	4	0	0	0	0
1958–65	St. George	113	13	0	0	39
1967	Cronulla-Sutherland	22	3	0	0	9
	Total	139	16	0	0	48
Representative
Years	Team	Pld	T	G	FG	P
1960	New South Wales	1	0	0	0	0
- Relatives: Michael Porter (son)

Montague "Monty" Porter PSM (1934–2011) was an Australian premiership winning and state representative rugby league footballer who played in the 1950s and 1960s. He was a second rower with the St. George Dragons during their eleven-year premiership winning run from 1956 to 1966, playing in six winning grand final teams. He was the inaugural captain of the Cronulla-Sutherland Sharks in that club's foundation season of 1967. After football, he had a successful career as a sports administrator.

== Career ==
=== Footballer ===
Born in Peak Hill, near Coolah in the central north of New South Wales, Porter grew up in Werris Creek where his father, a country schoolteacher was posted. He played schoolboy rugby league at Tamworth High and later for East Tamworth, where as a twenty-year-old he turned out against the touring 1954 Great Britain side. He played for Thirroul and Wests in the Southern Division. After an obligatory period national service he arrived in Sydney in 1955 getting a start in the NSWRFL Sydney competition with Western Suburbs. He spent the season in reserve grade making just four first-grade appearances that year. He left the club in 1956 after spending the first six games of that season in the lower grade. He trialled with Thirroul in the Southern Division using a false name to circumvent the residential qualification rules of the time and spent the rest of the 1956 season in their top grade.

He moved to the St. George club in 1957 and was called into the first-grade team during the 1958 finals series at prop-forward, helping the side to their 3rd successive premiership. He cemented his spot from 1959, enjoying great success as a second rower. The club won the premiership every year he was at the club. In 1966 he signed for the newly formed Cronulla club and became their foundation captain in their inaugural year in 1967.

He made one representative appearance for New South Wales in 1960.

=== Administrator ===
He retired from playing in 1968 and became the club secretary of the Cronulla-Sutherland club until 1970. He remained actively involved with the club as chairman of selectors and under-23s coach until 1973.

He won a job managing the New South Wales State Government's sports administration arm Sports House which during the 1970s and 1980s provided free administration facilities for amateur sports. He progressed to the role of assistant director of sport in New South Wales which he held for four years. In 1983 he became a member of the first ever NSWRFL board of directors. That same year the NSWRFL found itself administering the Cronulla Sharks when the club ran into financial difficulties; Porter accepted a post as president of the club from 1984 to 1988.

In 1994 he came out of retirement to accept a caretaker role as acting general manager of the Sydney International Aquatic Centres at Homebush. The facilities were built ahead of the Sydney 2000 Olympics and required management prior to the appointment of full-time operators.

=== Accolades ===
In his role as a sports administrator, Monty was awarded in the 1993 Queen's Birthday Honours List as a recipient of The Public Service Medal, which acknowledges outstanding service by employees of the Australian Government and/or state governments. During the Australian Rugby League's 2008 Centenary Year a college of the game's historians were asked to retrospectively give a Man-of-the-Match award for each of the 32 Grand finals held between 1954 and 1986 before the official Clive Churchill Medals came into existence. Porter was the winner of the 1960 award for his grand final performance against Easts. Sports author Larry Writer describes Porter's role in the elite Dragon's side as "a tradesman in a team of stars, a self-described 'plugger' who did his job each game with minimum fuss and maximum efficiency" whose primary job was to "tackle, tackle, tackle" and whose dependability was highly prized by his teammates. Writer suggests that such specialists hadn't come into vogue in the 1960s in Australian rugby league but by the 1970s at least one such second-rower was a critical for every successful side and players such as Steve Folkes and David Gillespie are examples of those whose playing and later coaching careers were forged entirely on their defensive capabilities with playing styles similar to Porter's.

Since 2008 the Cronulla club has awarded the Monty Porter Medal to its first grade Player of the Year.

Since 2012 the Monty Porter Memorial Cup has been awarded to the team winning the annual Cronulla Sutherland Sharks and St George Illawarra Dragons NRL matches.

== Personal life ==
His marriage to his wife Nola Messiter was long-standing and they had three children. His son Michael made 154 first-grade appearances for the Cronulla club in an injury-affected career between 1984 and 1994. Monty Porter had suffered from Parkinson's disease for some years before his death. He died on 24 January 2011 aged 76.
