= Ron Turner (rugby league) =

Australia international rugby league footballer (1945–2026)

Personal information
- Full name: Ronald Turner
- Born: 6 February 1945 Gunnedah, New South Wales, Australia
- Died: 9 November 2026 (aged 81)

Playing information
- Position: Hooker
Club
Years	Team	Pld	T	G	FG	P
1970–75	Cronulla-Sutherland	92	12	0	0	36
1976	Newtown	9	0	0	0	0
	Total	101	12	0	0	36
Representative
Years	Team	Pld	T	G	FG	P
1972	New South Wales	1	0	0	0	0
1970–74	Australia	4	1	0	0	3
- Source: Whiticker/Hudson

Ronald Turner (6 February 1945 – 9 November 2026) was an Australian rugby league footballer who played in the 1970s. A New South Wales state and Australia national representative hooker, he played in Sydney's New South Wales Rugby Football League premiership for the Cronulla-Sutherland and Newtown clubs.

== Playing career ==
Originally from Gunnedah, New South Wales, Turner joined the Cronulla-Sutherland Sharks in 1970. He became the Shark's first Australian representative player when he was selected for the 1970 World Cup tour of England, and is listed on the Australian Players Register as Kangaroo No. 447. Turner played hooker in the World Cup Final in which Australia defeated England at Leeds.

Turner represented New South Wales on one occasion in 1972. He played in the Cronulla-Sutherland Sharks side that played in the 1973 NSWRFL season's grand final against Manly-Warringah. In 1974, Turner made his one test appearance when he played for the Kangaroos in the final Ashes Test against England. Turner retired in 1976 after spending his final season with Newtown.

== Death ==
Turner died on 9 November 2026 at the age of 81.
