= Cronulla-Sutherland Sharks =

Australian rugby league football club

Club information
- Full name: Cronulla Sutherland; District Rugby League; Football Club Limited
- Nickname(s): Sharks, Sharkies
- Short name: CRO
- Colours: Sky Blue; White; Black
- Founded: 1963 as Cronulla-Caringbah; 1967 in New South Wales Rugby League
- Website: sharks.com.au

Current details
- Ground: Endeavour Field (1)
- Coach: Craig Fitzgibbon (NRL); Tony Herman (NRLW)
- Captain: Blayke Brailey (NRL); Tiana Penitani-Gray (NRLW)
- Competition: National Rugby League
- 2026 season: 5th
- Current season

Uniforms
Home colours	Away colours

Records
- Premierships: 1 (2016)
- Runners-up: 3 (1973, 1978, 1997)
- Minor premierships: 2 (1988, 1999)
- NSW Cup: 3 (1994, 1996, 2013)
- Wooden spoons: 3 (1967, 1969, 2014)
- Most capped: 348 – Paul Gallen
- Highest try scorer: 166 – Andrew Ettingshausen
- Highest points scorer: 1,255 – Steve Rogers

The Cronulla-Sutherland Sharks are an Australian professional rugby league club based in the Sutherland Shire of Southern Sydney, New South Wales. Cronulla compete in the National Rugby League (NRL), Australasia's premier rugby league competition. The Sharks, as they are commonly known, were admitted to the New South Wales Rugby League premiership, predecessor of the Australian Rugby League and the current National Rugby League competition, in January 1967. The club competed in every premiership season since then and, during the Super League war, joined the rebel competition before continuing on in the re-united NRL Premiership. The Sharks have been in competition for 59 years, appearing in three NSWRL/ARL/NRL grand finals, and one Super League grand final, winning their first premiership in 2016 after defeating the Melbourne Storm at Stadium Australia.

== History ==
In 1967 the New South Wales Rugby Football League (NSWRFL) added two new clubs to the competition, Cronulla-Sutherland and Penrith, the first to join the competition since Parramatta and Manly were admitted 20 years earlier in 1947.

Founded by Peter Burns, Cronulla debuted in 1967 wearing a sky blue jersey adorned with a white V and red numbers on the back, at the then club home ground of Sutherland Oval, under the captaincy of multiple premiership-winner Monty Porter and the coaching of Ken Kearney. Cronulla earned immediate recognition when they beat Eastern Suburbs at the Sydney Sports Ground in their first match. They had only two more wins, against Norths and Parramatta, and finished last on the competition table.

In mid-1968 the club moved permanently to Endeavour Field at Woolooware, and became the only club in Sydney to own their own ground. Their first match there was against Parramatta and the Cronulla-Sutherland Sharks won 10–7.

Chart of yearly table positions for Cronulla-Sutherland Sharks in First Grade Rugby League

=== 1970s ===
Cronulla made their first grand final in 1973 against Manly losing 10–7. Cronulla met the Manly club again in the 1978 grand final, leading 7–2 well into the second half, before Manly came back and brought the scoreboard to 7–11. It took a late penalty goal from Steve Rogers to level scores at 11-all by full-time. The replay saw the Sharks opportunity pass by as they fielded a much-weakened team due to further injuries, eventually being shut-out by Manly 16–0. Cronulla were without suspended stars Greg Pierce and Dane Sorensen in both games, while hooker John McMartin, fullback Mick Mullane and Barry Andrews were all injured for the replay.

=== 1980s ===
Cronulla suffered major financial trouble in 1983, with the NSWRL appointing an administrator and providing a loan. Western Suburbs and Newtown, both in a similar predicament, were refused a loan, with Newtown being forced out of the competition. Cronulla also made the final of the mid-week KB Cup, but lost again to Manly, 26–6.

In 1985, Cronulla was buoyed by the arrival of 'super coach' Jack Gibson, who had coached Easts and Parramatta to premierships. Gibson left the club in good shape in 1987, with the promise fulfilled in 1988 when Cronulla won the minor premiership, led by veteran second-rower Gavin Miller, who was named Dally M Player of the Year, and Rothmans Medal winning halfback, Barry Russell. However, Russell dislocated his shoulder two weeks before the finals, and missed the semi-final where Cronulla went down to Canterbury. He was rushed back in for the final against Balmain, but he was severely hampered by the injury, and Cronulla were bundled out. A bright spot for the Sharks, though, was the selection in the Australian team of Miller, and young centres, Ettingshausen and Mark McGaw.

In 1989, Cronulla sneaked into the finals after thrashing Illawarra 46–14 in the final round, followed by a memorable 38–14 victory over the Brisbane Broncos in the play-off for fifth position. However, they could not repeat the performance in their semi-final against eventual premiers Canberra, in what was their third game in seven days. Gavin Miller was rewarded for another great year with both the Dally M Player of the Year award and the Rothmans Medal.

=== 1990s ===
Cronulla again dropped into a period of poor form and financial trouble in 1990, but the appointment as coach of rugby league Immortal, Arthur Beetson, in 1992 helped turn the on-field problems around. He helped develop a batch of promising players, including five-eighth Mitch Healey, fullback David Peachey, winger Richie Barnett, second-rower Sean Ryan, prop Adam Ritson, and hooker Aaron Raper, son of another Immortal, Johnny Raper. However, Cronulla were forced into receivership in 1993.

Beetson was replaced as coach in 1994 by John Lang, a former Australian hooker, and coach of the Brisbane Easts team. Lang brought halfback, Paul Green, down from Brisbane with him. A golden age for the club had begun, signalled by the two lower grade teams (President's Cup and Reserve grade) winning their competitions. During John Lang's coaching period, from 1994 to 2001, Cronulla made the semi-finals every year except for 1994 and 1998. The club had a glamorous image and attracted record crowds, with a corresponding financial improvement.

In 1995, Cronulla were one of the first clubs to join the Super League competition, which kicked off after protracted legal battles and much bitterness, in 1997. The club was motivated by a dissatisfaction with the perceived favouritism of the NSWRL administration towards other clubs, and a still-risky financial situation.

They reached the inaugural – and only – grand final of the ten-team Super League competition, only to lose to a vastly superior Brisbane side 26–8 in Brisbane. The game was notable for being the first grand final to be played outside Sydney. The club rejoined the reunited National Rugby League competition in 1998.

Arguably Cronulla's best season ever was in 1999, when they again won the Minor Premiership and the J. J. Giltinan Shield in convincing fashion. Cronulla-Sutherland easily accounted for the Brisbane Broncos in the quarter-final, and led 8–0 in the grand final qualifier against arch rivals the St George Illawarra Dragons before eventually losing 8–24. Following the season, a planned merger with South Sydney was met with staunch opposition from both clubs, and Cronulla was retained for the rationalised 14-team 2000 competition. Also in 1999, the Cronulla-Sutherland name was dropped, and the club was simply known as the "Sharks", and would be known as this until the end of 2002.

=== 2000s ===
Cronulla lost the grand final qualifier in similar circumstances in 2001, to eventual premiers Newcastle. The year was marked by the sudden rise of halfback Preston Campbell, who was named Dally M Player of the Year, despite being a fringe first grader at the start of the season.

In 2002, John Lang was replaced by Australian coach Chris Anderson, who had led Canterbury Bulldogs and Melbourne Storm to premierships. The following two years were the most acrimonious in the club's history. The first year was almost an on-field success, as Anderson retained the core of John Lang's team, and the Sharks again reached the grand final qualifier. However another heartbreaking loss to New Zealand, the replacement of halfback Preston Campbell – a crowd favourite – with former Melbourne halfback Brett Kimmorley, and a string of released players signaled trouble for 2003.

This was realised with the sudden mid-season departure of long-time stalwarts Nick Graham and Dean Treister. The Sharks finished 11th, suffering a record 74–4 loss to Parramatta in a match marred by the controversial performance of referee Shayne Hayne. Three Cronulla players were sent from the field, including Sharks captain David Peachey, for ignoring the referee's instructions. Constant infighting between the board and the coach led to Anderson's departure at the end of the season.

The same year the club's name reverted to Cronulla-Sutherland, Chris Anderson was replaced by Stuart Raper, another son of Johnny Raper, and the coach of the President's Cup-winning team in 1994. A loyal clubman, he instantly brought a revival in club and supporter spirit. However, Raper's apparent focus on team harmony rather than results led to Cronulla's win percentage worsening, from 49% (24 wins 27 losses) under Anderson, to 43% (31 wins 42 losses).

Steve Rogers, the CEO of the Cronulla Sharks and a former club legend, died on 3 January 2006 at the age of 51 of a "mixture of prescription drugs and alcohol". In April, 2006, the NSW state coroner ruled that the death was accidental.

On 21 April 2006, after much work and lobbying carried out by then-Chairman Barry Pierce and Sharks board member Brian Quinn, Peter Costello, on behalf of the Federal Government, announced they would be funding a $9.6 million upgrade to Toyota Park. The funds were primarily used to construct the Southern Stand which was never completed but later named the Monty Porter Stand.

Cronulla finished the 2006 season in disastrous fashion. After winning 8 out of 9 games in the middle of the season and climbing to near the top of the ladder, the team experienced the worst losing streak in the club's history, losing their last 10 consecutive games. In a see-sawing match to finish a tumultuous season, the Sharks in their final game coming back from 26–0 down only to lose 26–24 to Canberra. A missed penalty goal in the dying seconds of the match would have sent the game into extra-time, allowing the chance for Cronulla to equal the biggest single-game comeback in the history of top-level rugby league in Australia.

On 22 September 2006, the Sharks Board ended weeks of speculation over the future of Coach Stuart Raper by sacking him as first-grade coach and handing him a sizeable payout, making him the second consecutive coach to receive such a payout. On 26 September, Australian Test Coach Ricky Stuart signed a three-year deal to coach the Sharks as of 2007, replacing Raper.

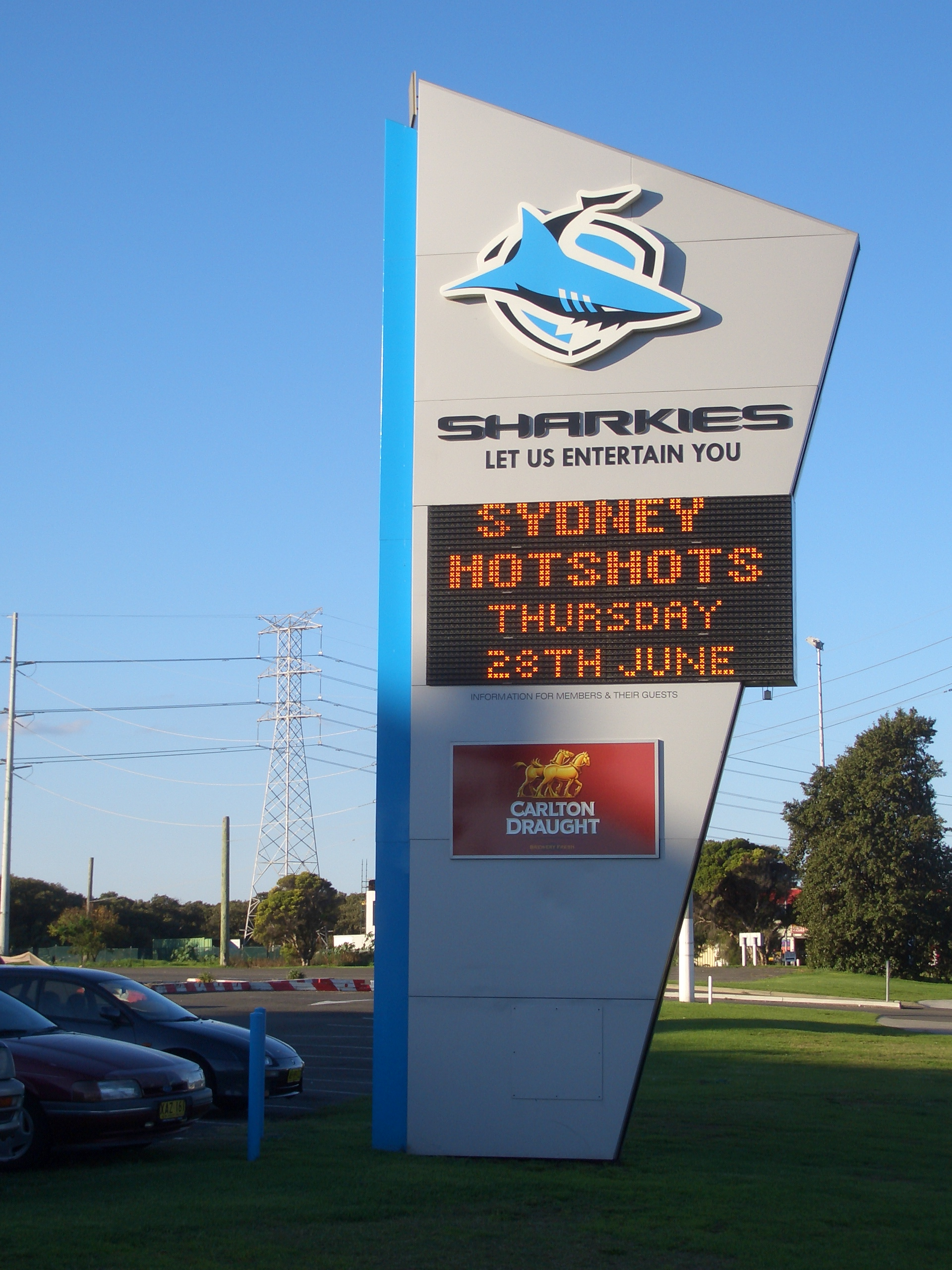
Sharkies Leagues Club

Round one of the 2007 NRL season saw Cronulla-Sutherland break their 10-game losing streak against the Penrith Panthers with an 18–0 victory at Toyota Park. Ricky Stuart led the Sharks to fifth on the ladder at the halfway mark of the season surprising many critics. Towards the end of the season, Cronulla plunged to 15th on the league ladder, slumping to seven straight losses. The season ended with the Sharks in 11th place, rounding off a heartbreaking season, with the club losing no less than nine matches by 4 points or less.

Cronulla-Sutherland had a strong season in 2008, finishing the season in equal first spot (third on for and against). They had one of the best defensive records, but one of the worst attacking records in the league. They had an excellent start to the season, beating defending grand finalists Manly and premiers Melbourne in away games in the first two rounds. After a comprehensive 36–10 victory over Canberra in the Qualifying Final at Toyota Stadium, Cronulla were beaten 28–0 by Melbourne (who later were found to be over the salary cap and cheating) in the Preliminary Final at the Sydney Football Stadium. This was a disappointing end to an otherwise successful season.

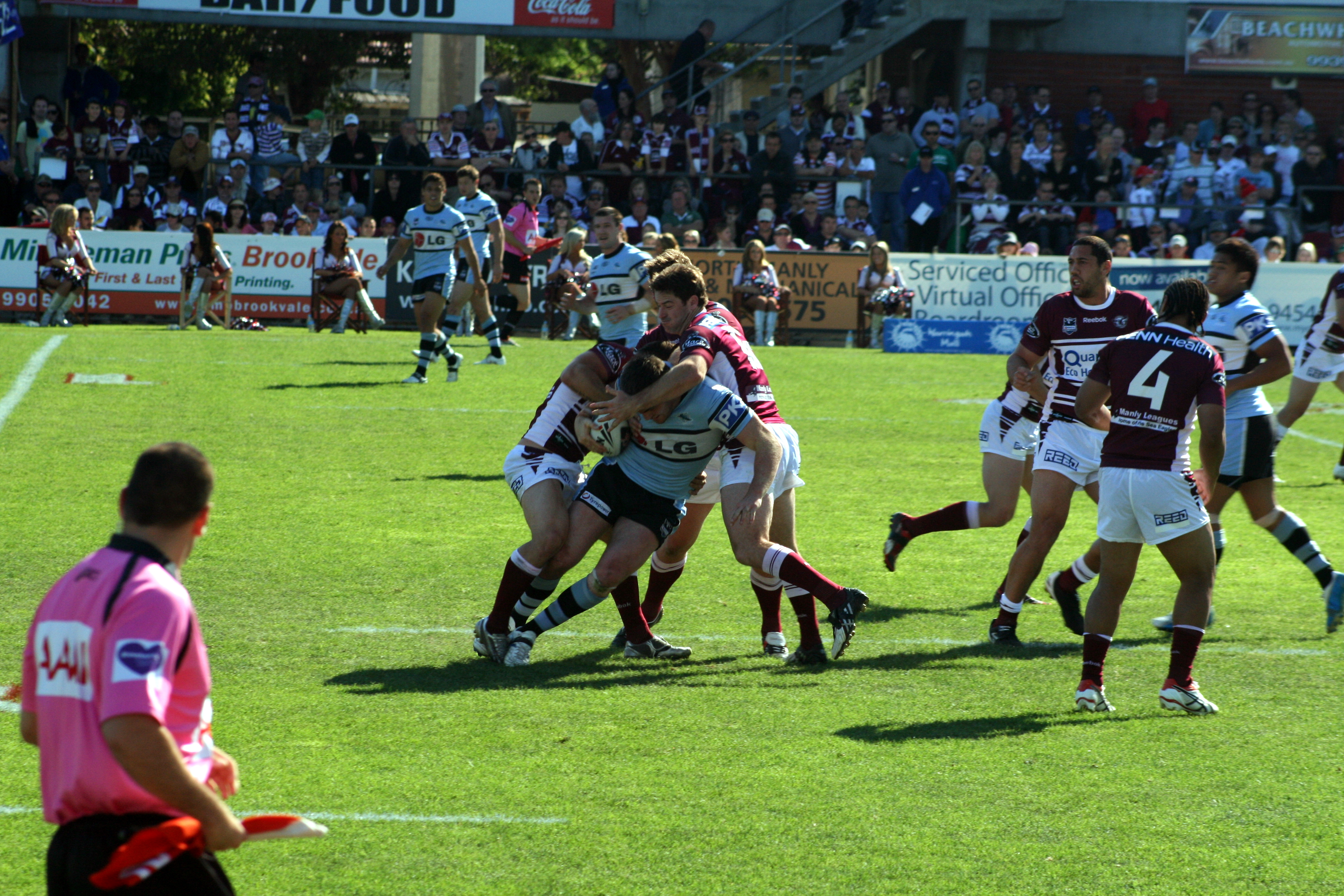
Cronulla attack Manly in August 2009

During the 2009 season Cronulla's dire financial problems became public knowledge. Asset-rich, owning its stadium and the surrounding land, but with cash flow problems due to its low average home gate and poor on-field performances in recent seasons, the club announced plans for a partial relocation to the Central Coast, which was rebuffed by the NRL. It was to split home games for the 2010–14 seasons among:

- 6 at Endeavour Field, to include local derbies with the St George Illawarra Dragons and Canterbury-Bankstown Bulldogs,
- 5 at Central Coast Stadium in Gosford, Central Coast, and
- 1 at Hindmarsh Stadium in Adelaide, South Australia.

In May 2009, an ABC Four Corners investigation revealed the Sharks players involvement in a group sex scandal on a pre-season tour in 2002. The club further slid into crisis when it also emerged that CEO Tony Zappia had allegedly punched a female staff member and joked about it. Zappia and Coach Ricky Stuart also then attempted to bully the female staff member into retracting her complaint.

Zappia and Stuart were also investigated for their role around unusual financial transactions with Clint Elford, a fan who falsely claimed to be terminally ill, and who had sent money to Zappia and Stuart to spend on the Sharks. Elford was subsequently found guilty of fraud and Stuart refused to answer questions when the NRL launched an investigation. CEO Tony Zappia was investigated and subsequently sacked for his role.

On 26 May 2009 businessman Damian Irvine, together with a fresh board of directors, took over control of the club as the St George bank were threatening to foreclose.

They recorded 9 straight losses after a win in Round 1 in 2009 and despite a midseason revival with four straight wins, the Cronulla side slipped to ten straight defeats to equal the club's worst losing streak. One of these losses caused great controversy as the Sharks, playing against Manly, were forced to field just 12 men for most of the game after Luke Douglas was sent off by referee Phil Haines for a careless high tackle. The Sharks managed to avoid the wooden spoon in 2009 when the Roosters were soundly beaten by the Cowboys in the final round, resulting in a lower overall standing than the Sharks. Avoiding last position was a rare positive in a horror season for the Cronulla club.

=== 2010 ===
The start of the 2010 season saw Cronulla return confident of turning around recent disappointing results, however on-field performance remained poor. After the board developed a plan to refinance debt and a long-term financial strategy, Richard Fisk resigned in June 2010 due to his failure to find common ground with Chairman Irvine and his board and a failure by Fisk to refresh the commercial area of the club. The club's head coach, Ricky Stuart, also tendered his resignation and was replaced towards the back end of the season by his then-assistant coach Shane Flanagan.

Promising wing/centre Blake Ferguson was criticised for comments about wanting to leave the club in order to achieve success. On Tuesday, 20 July Ricky Stuart left the Sharks for the rest of the season after admitting he could get no more out of the players and had "lost" them. Chairman Irvine opted to give a chance to Assistant NSW and Cronulla coach Shane Flanagan. After departing, Stuart also cited a fractured relationship with Chairman Damian Irvine as a reason for his departure despite the club making positive strides off-field under his guidance and commitment and Irvine making funds available to back Stuart in the player market as he wished.

=== 2011 ===
The 2011 season started so promising for the club. The addition of Wade Graham at five-eighth and New Zealand international Jeremy Smith to a pack already containing two origin players promised an end to the Sharks' status as cellar-dwellers. Despite being humiliated by Canberra at Canberra Stadium in round one, 40–12, the club won its next two matches. They beat defending premiers St. George Illawarra 16–10 at home in round two, and smashed Penrith 44–12 at Centerbet Stadium. Missing a number of first-team starters due to injury, Cronulla then lost five in a row to the New Zealand Warriors (26-18), Manly-Warringah Sea Eagles (19-13), Newcastle Knights (24-20), North Queensland Cowboys (30-12), and South Sydney (31-12), dropping down the table, from 9th to 15th.

They broke their hoodoo in round ten, when they beat the struggling Sydney Roosters 18–4 at Toyota Stadium. They were again disappointing in round eleven, when they were defeated 40-6 by Parramatta at Parramatta Stadium. Despite losing 14–8 to the Storm in round 12, they were much improved and forced Melbourne into a classic showdown at AAMI Park in Melbourne. They then faced Brisbane at home in round 13, going down 34–16, before a bye in round 14 gave them the chance to regroup. While the Sharks were taking a much needed break skipper Paul Gallen led the NSW Blues Origin team to a memorable 18–8 victory over Queensland. He then played outstandingly for the Sharks in their round 15 match against Canterbury-Bankstown just three days after the State of Origin match, a game in which Cronulla beat Canterbury-Bankstown 26–10. The next four weeks saw a turnaround of the club's performance, with victory over the Gold Coast Titans 36-12 and the South Sydney Rabbitohs 24–4, before they took revenge against the Canberra Raiders 26–12.

=== 2012 ===
Cronulla lost their two props for the 2012 season, Origin representative Kade Snowden to Newcastle and Luke Douglas signing for the Gold Coast Titans. Captain Paul Gallen's transformation into an Origin prop alleviated this problem somewhat, and the Sharks were active in the player market, signing prop Jon Green from St George, former Shark Isaac de Gois, prop Mark Taufua from Newcastle, halfback Jeff Robson from Parramatta and props Bryce Gibbs and Andrew Fifita from Wests Tigers.

2012 began very well for the club under Chairman Damian Irvine, Coach Shane Flanagan. The recruitment by Mooney and Flanagan paid dividends with new recruits Jeff Robson, Andrew Fifita, Todd Carney, Ben Ross, Isaac De Gois and Mark Taufua taking pressure off Paul Gallen allowing him to hit a purple patch of form. The club won 6 matches in a row for the first time in over a decade and after 8 rounds were sitting third on the table as the highest placed Sydney based franchise.

A difficult State of Origin period saw injuries to captain Paul Gallen and star Todd Carney. Cronulla struggled to recover and struggled in the back half of the year, however still capped a remarkable turnaround by qualifying for their first finals series in 4 years, losing to Canberra in week one. The match notable for seeing Paul Gallen outplayed by young rival Josh Papalii and Todd Carney injuring his Achilles.

Sponsorship deals with SHARK Energy Drink, Fishermans Friends, and Luxbet flooded in and helped the financial situation off-field, with the close of Season 2012 seeing Shane Flanagan emerge as one of the game's leading up and coming head coaches and his mentor Damian Irvine the game's leading young administrator.

=== 2013 ===
At the beginning of Season 2013, Irvine stood down as chairman on learning of the questionable operational and duty of care practices of coach Shane Flanagan, and Darren Mooney during 2011 which exposed the club to the ASADA scandal. Flanagan was stood down and Peter Sharp stepped up to the head coaching role. Flanagan returned in 2013, a season in which the Sharks qualified for the competition semi finals, before he was forced to serve a 9-month suspension handed down by the NRL for breaches of basic governance and duty of care practices, thus validating the strong ethical stance made by Irvine and the board in March 2013.

Sharp again took over the reins, before resigning mid season the week after the club's greatest comeback victory, with the team coming from 22 nil down to beat the Brisbane Broncos 24–22. Following that win, a photo went viral of Sharks playmaker Todd Carney pretending to urinate into his own mouth. Just one day after Carney was stood down by Cronulla CEO Steve Noyce, Sharp resigned as interim head coach and was replaced by James Shepherd.

=== 2014–2015 ===
The 2014 season saw a myriad of struggles for Cronulla on the field, with injuries and the suspension of five players involved in the supplements scandal of 2011, missing games at the back end of the season. Cronulla finished 2014 with the Wooden Spoon.

In 2015, the club climbed the ladder to eventually finish 6th with two wins over eventual minor premiers Sydney Roosters and 2014's premiers South Sydney. 2015 was also the year Flanagan was reappointed as coach of Cronulla after sitting out the 2014 NRL season. The club would reach the second week of the finals series where they were defeated 39-0 by North Queensland in Townsville.

=== 2016 ===
The 2016 NRL season started with a 20–14 loss to 2015 premiers, North Queensland Cowboys. This was followed by a 30–2 win over the St. George Illawarra Dragons and a loss to Manly Warringah, 22–12. Cronulla then went on to win 15 games in a row from Round 4 against the Melbourne Storm to Round 21, against the Gold Coast Titans, resulting in an 18-all draw. This was the largest win streak in the club's history. During this period Cronulla equaled their largest win score by defeating the Newcastle Knights 62–0.

They then went on to win 1 out of their last 5 games resulting in a drop from 1st to 3rd. In round 26, the Cronulla-Sutherland and Melbourne Storm faced off in a minor premiership showdown in which the Melbourne Storm won 26–6 in AAMI Park. They went on to defeat the Raiders in the Week 1 qualifying final 16-14 and earning the week off. Advancing to the Preliminary final, they defeated defending premiers North Queensland Cowboys 32–20 at the Sydney Football Stadium. They would face and defeat the Melbourne Storm in the 2016 NRL Grand Final. Cronulla, after leading 8–0 at half-time, prevailed in a gripping affair 14–12 to claim their first premiership in the club's 50-year history. Cronulla second rower Luke Lewis was awarded the Clive Churchill Medal as Man of the Match.

Soon after the Maiden premiership victory stat player Ben Barba tested positive for Cocaine and was sacked from the club. Chairman Damian Keogh, who rose to the position on a platform of promising good governance and increased commercial experience garnered from his role as CEO of HOYTS Australia, was also arrested for possession of Cocaine whilst in Sydney's CBD and resigned from the position of Sharks Chairman as a result.

=== 2017 World Club Challenge and 2017 season ===
Cronulla played Wigan Warriors at the DW Stadium on 19 February 2017, losing 22–6 to a strong Wigan side. In the 2017 NRL season, Cronulla reached the finals. In week one, Cronulla played against North Queensland in the elimination final. Cronulla went on to be upset 15-14 and were eliminated from the finals ending their premiership defence.

=== 2018 and financial struggles ===
In the 2018 NRL season, Cronulla-Sutherland finished 4th on the table and qualified for the finals. The club would eventually reach the preliminary final but were defeated by Melbourne 22–6 at AAMI Park.

During the 2019 preseason, on 29 November, it was confirmed that Cronulla would be forced into sacking 10 staff members to help their financial situation. It was reported that Cronulla had lost $3 million, despite being given support of the NRL.

On 19 December 2018, Cronulla head coach Shane Flanagan was de-registered as a coach indefinitely for failing to adhere to the conditions of his suspension in 2014. The NRL integrity unit had found that Flanagan had sent more than fifty emails exchanged between Flanagan, club management and the football department which was strictly against the conditions of his suspension which included that Flanagan was to have no contact or involvement with the club during his ban. The NRL also fined Cronulla $800,000 as punishment.

=== 2019 ===
On 31 July 2019, it was revealed by the Sydney Morning Herald that Cronulla would be moving their home games away from Shark Park for two seasons as part of the club's redevelopment of the Cronulla Leagues Club and Shark Park itself.

At the end of the 2019 regular season, Cronulla finished 7th on the table with 12 wins and 12 losses and qualified for the finals. In the elimination final against Manly, Cronulla lost 28–16 at Brookvale Oval which ended their season.

=== 2020 ===
Cronulla-Sutherland finished 8th on the table in the 2020 NRL season and qualified for the finals after recovering from a poor start to the year. Cronulla were then eliminated in the first week of the finals losing to the Canberra Raiders 32–20 at Canberra Stadium.

=== 2021 ===
Cronulla started the 2021 NRL season two wins from their opening five games. Following the club's 28–16 loss against the Sydney Roosters, head coach John Morris was terminated from his position and replaced with interim head coach Josh Hannay. The club would then go on to lose their next five matches in a row. Cronulla then recovered to sit in eighth place with two games remaining of the regular season. In the final round of the year, Cronulla-Sutherland lost 28–16 against Melbourne and the Gold Coast leapfrogged them into eighth place after they defeated the New Zealand Warriors. Cronulla finished the season in ninth place and missed out on the finals for the first time since 2014.

=== 2022-2025 (Regular Season Success, Postseason Struggles) ===
Cronulla surprised many in the 2022 NRL season after finishing second on the table at the end of the regular season. Throughout the year, Cronulla went on a six-game winning run. Halfback Nicho Hynes won the 2022 Dally M Medal with a record 38 votes. In the finals series, Cronulla were defeated 31–30 by North Queensland in the qualifying final which was played at Shark Park. Cronulla had led the match 30–22 with less than ten minutes to go before North Queensland forced the game into extra-time. Former Cronulla player Valentine Holmes kicked the winning field goal for North Queensland. The following week, Cronulla were defeated 38–12 by South Sydney in the semi-final which ended their season.

Cronulla started the year strong, pushing into the top 4 at certain stages, before a mid-season slump dropped some of their momentum. They finished the 2023 in sixth place, eventually losing to the Sydney Roosters at Shark Park in an elimination final, 13-12.

Cronulla finished the 2024 NRL season in 4th place on the table and qualified for the finals. After losing to Melbourne in week one, Cronulla won their first finals game in over six years as they defeated North Queensland in the elimination semi-final. In the preliminary final against Penrith, Cronulla went into half-time being narrowly behind on the scoreboard. However, in the second half, Penrith would run away with the game winning 26-6 ending Cronulla's season.

Cronulla finished the 2025 NRL season in 5th place on the ladder and qualified for the finals once more. Cronulla won the elimination qualifying final, defeating the Sydney Roosters 20-10 at Shark Park. Cronulla would later upset the minor premiers, the Canberra Raiders 32-12 at GIO Stadium, to progress to the Preliminary Finals where they would lose to Melbourne 22-14.

In round 10, Cronulla fell to a 4–5 record after a dismal 36–12 defeat against an understrength South Sydney team. Rugby League legend Andrew Johns labelled it as their worst performance for a couple of years. In round 19 of the 2026 NRL season, Cronulla recorded the biggest victory in their history as they defeated the Dolphins 66-0 at Kayo Stadium. Cronulla would finish 5th on the table at the end of the regular season. After defeating North Queensland in the elimination final the club were knocked out the following week by eventual premiers the Sydney Roosters.

== Emblem, colours, and song ==
=== Logo ===
The club wasn't known as the Sharks until after its initial admission into the competition. During Cronulla's first season the crest featured a drawing of Captain Cook's ship, HM Bark Endeavour. It is alleged that during the first season the club president suggested the 'Lions' while the captain Ken Kearney recommended the 'Sharks'. The 'Sharks" nickname had already being used for the club in The Rugby League News in January 1967 prior to the start of their inaugural season.

From the late 1970s through to the late 1990s, the Sharks used a predominantly black circular crest with a blue shark. This was changed after Super League in 1997 to a blue-and-white star-shaped design. Between 1999 and 2002, the name was shortened to the mononym "Sharks", dropping the district name of Cronulla-Sutherland in an attempt to gain more fans from outside the Sutherland Shire. Since 2003, the name has since been changed back to the Cronulla-Sutherland Sharks and changed their logo again in 2004, which is currently in use.

1967

1968-1969

1970-1977

1978-1997

1998-2003

2004-Present

For Cronulla's maiden season in first grade, a sky blue jersey with a white V with a black border was adopted from the Cronulla Surf Life Saving Club colours, although Cronulla had used chocolate-and-gold jerseys in the Sydney 2nd Division competition. Grey was incorporated into the team colours during the Super League era, and shortly after on the team's away strip.

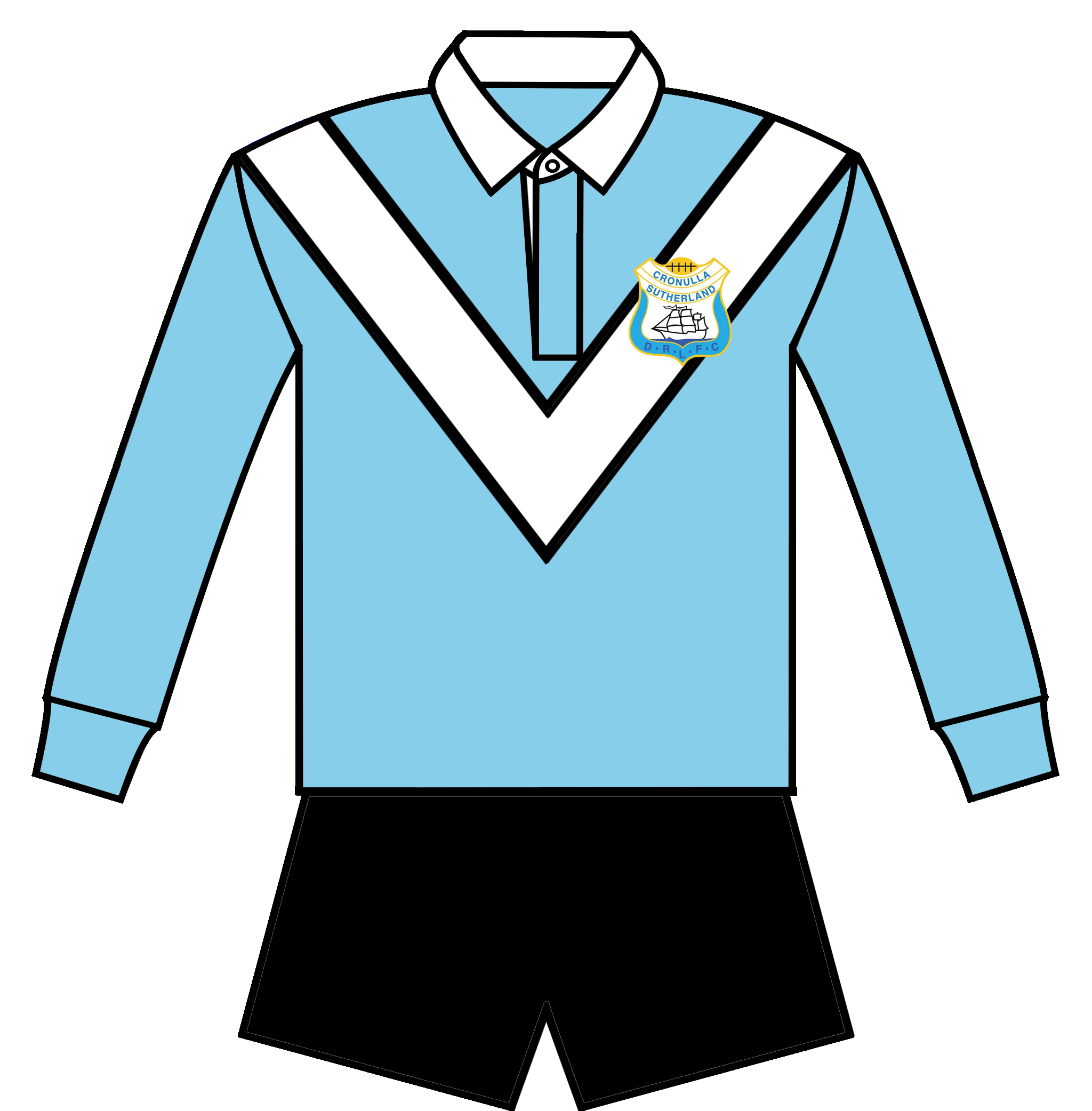
1967

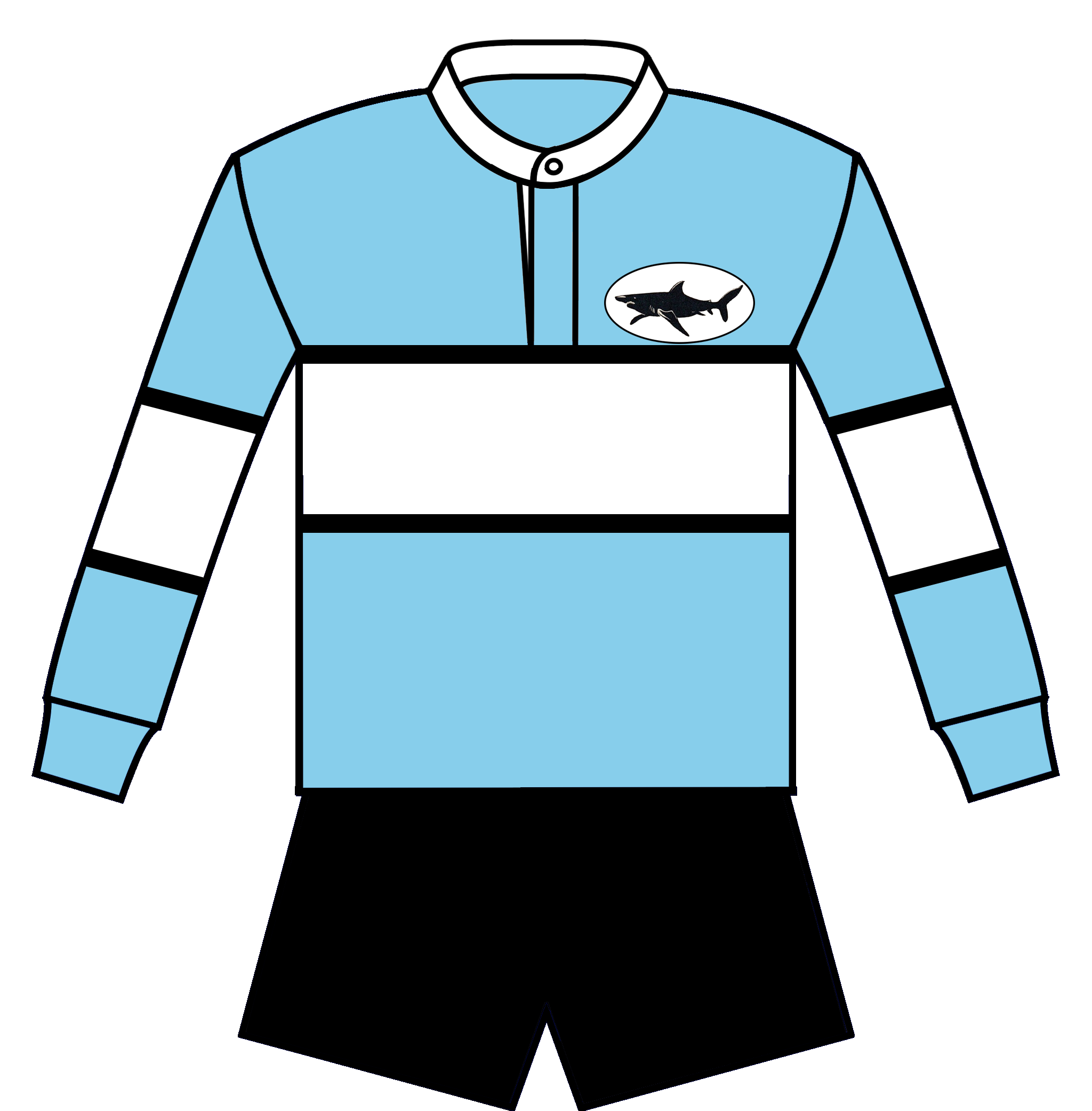
1968–1977

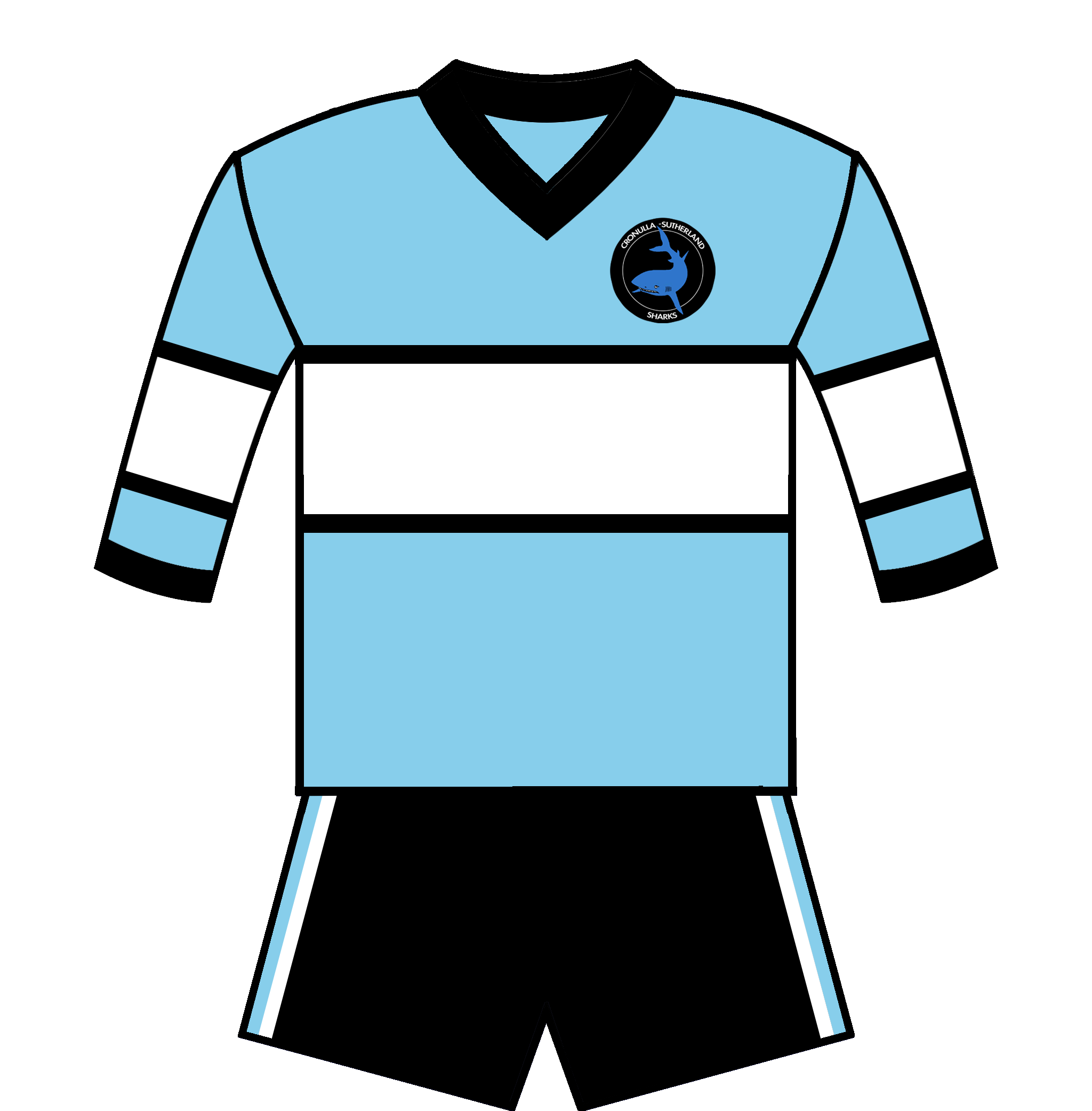
1978–1980, 1985–1994

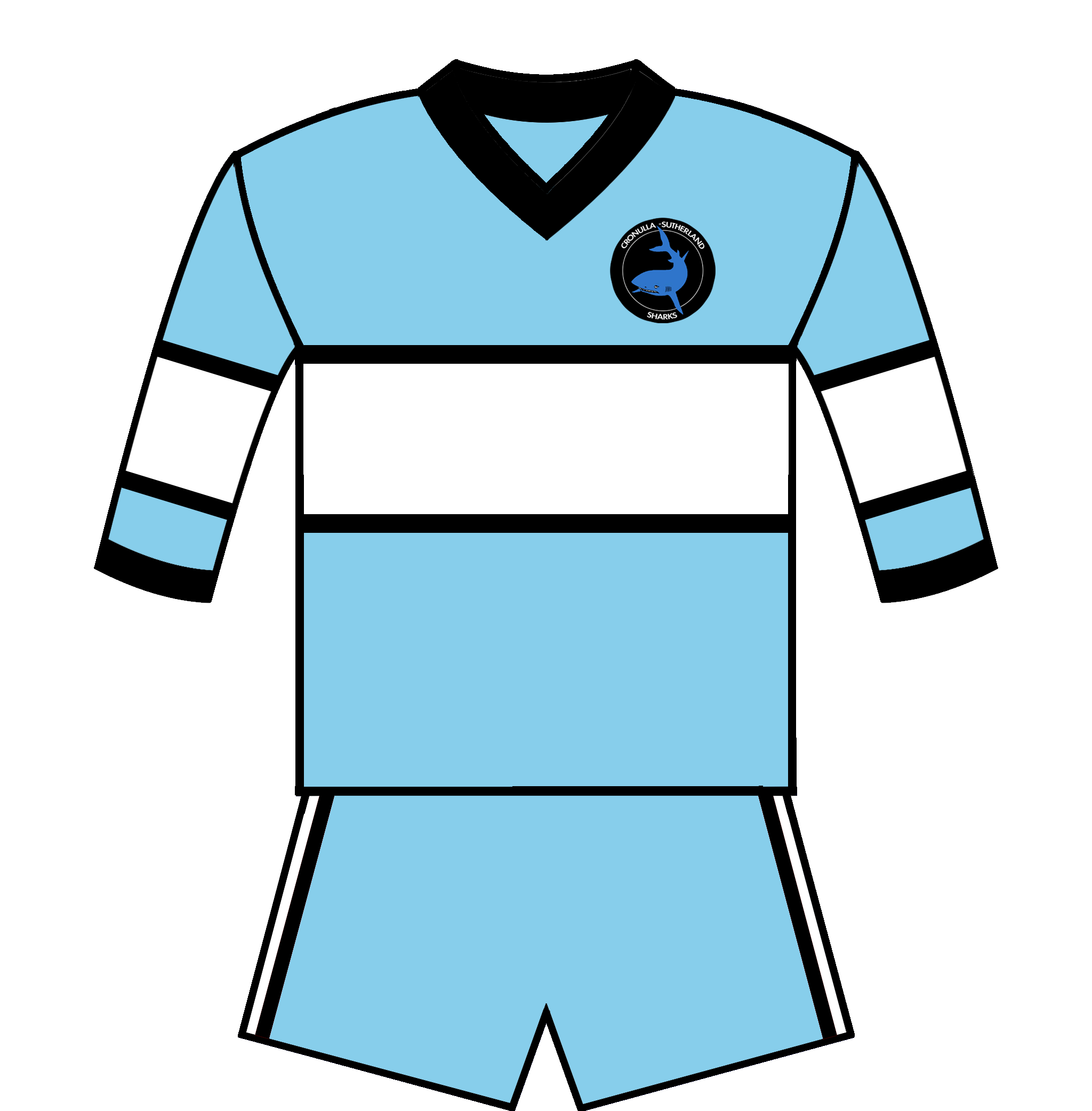
1981–1982

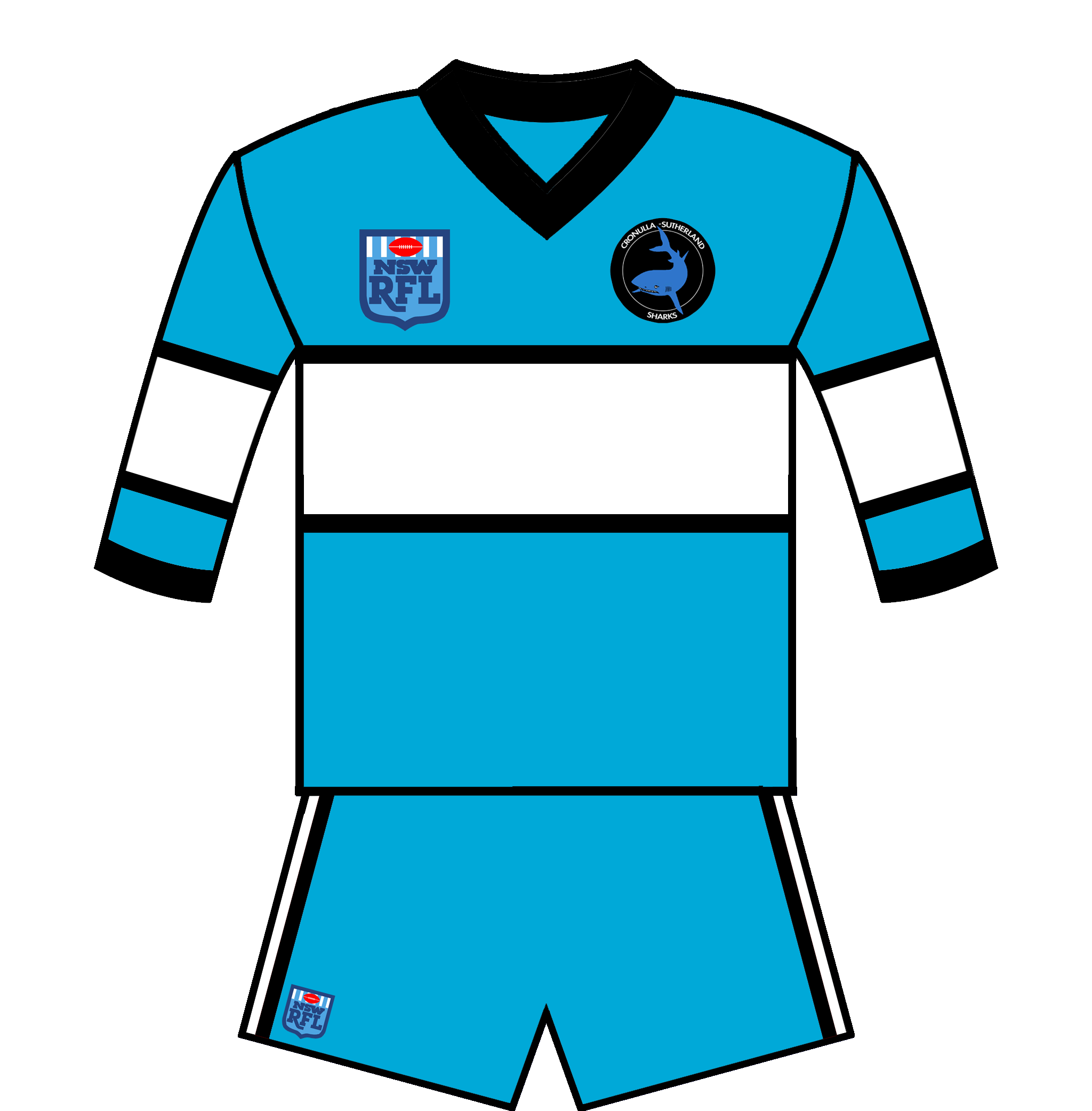
1983–1984

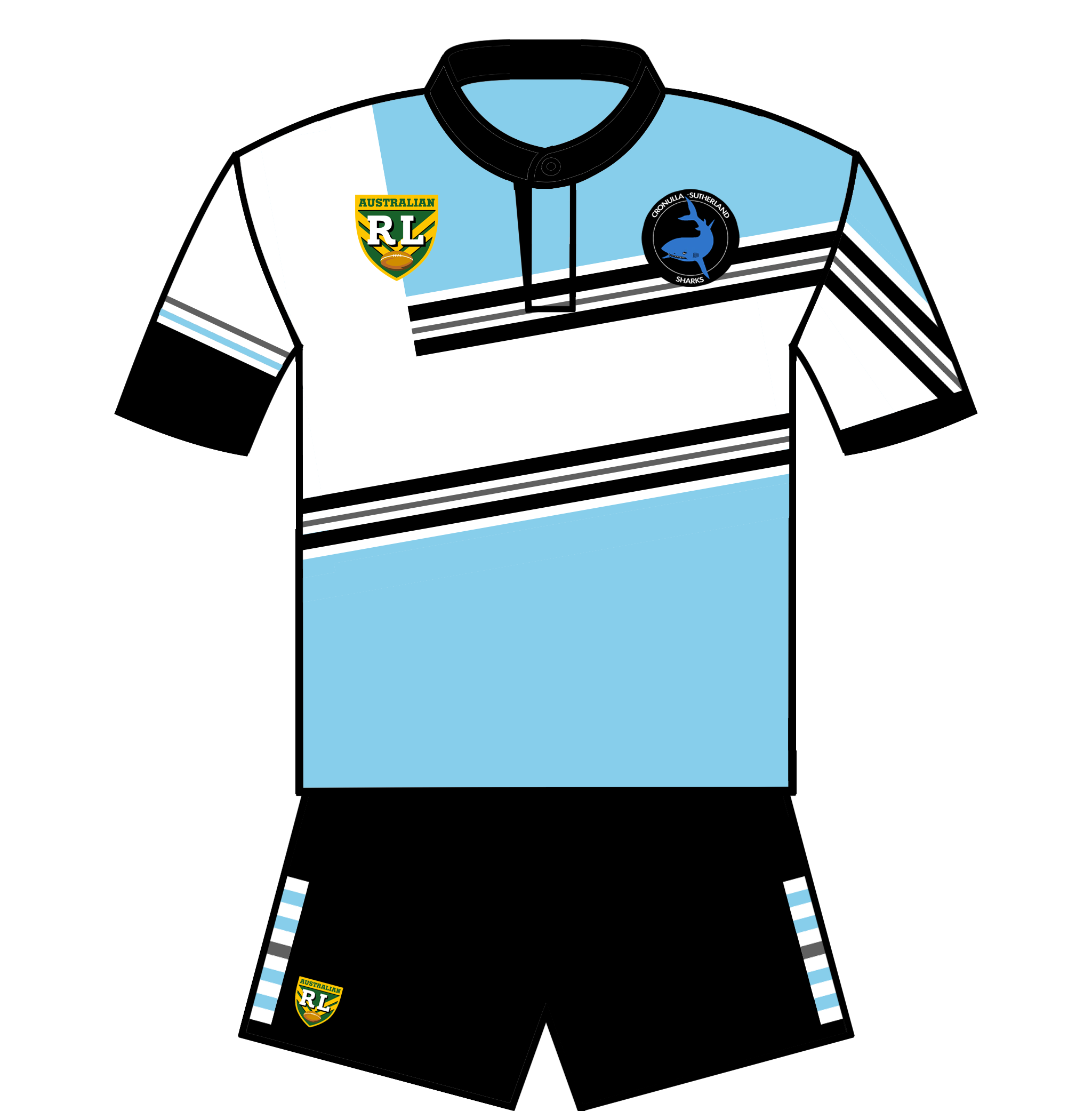
1995–1996

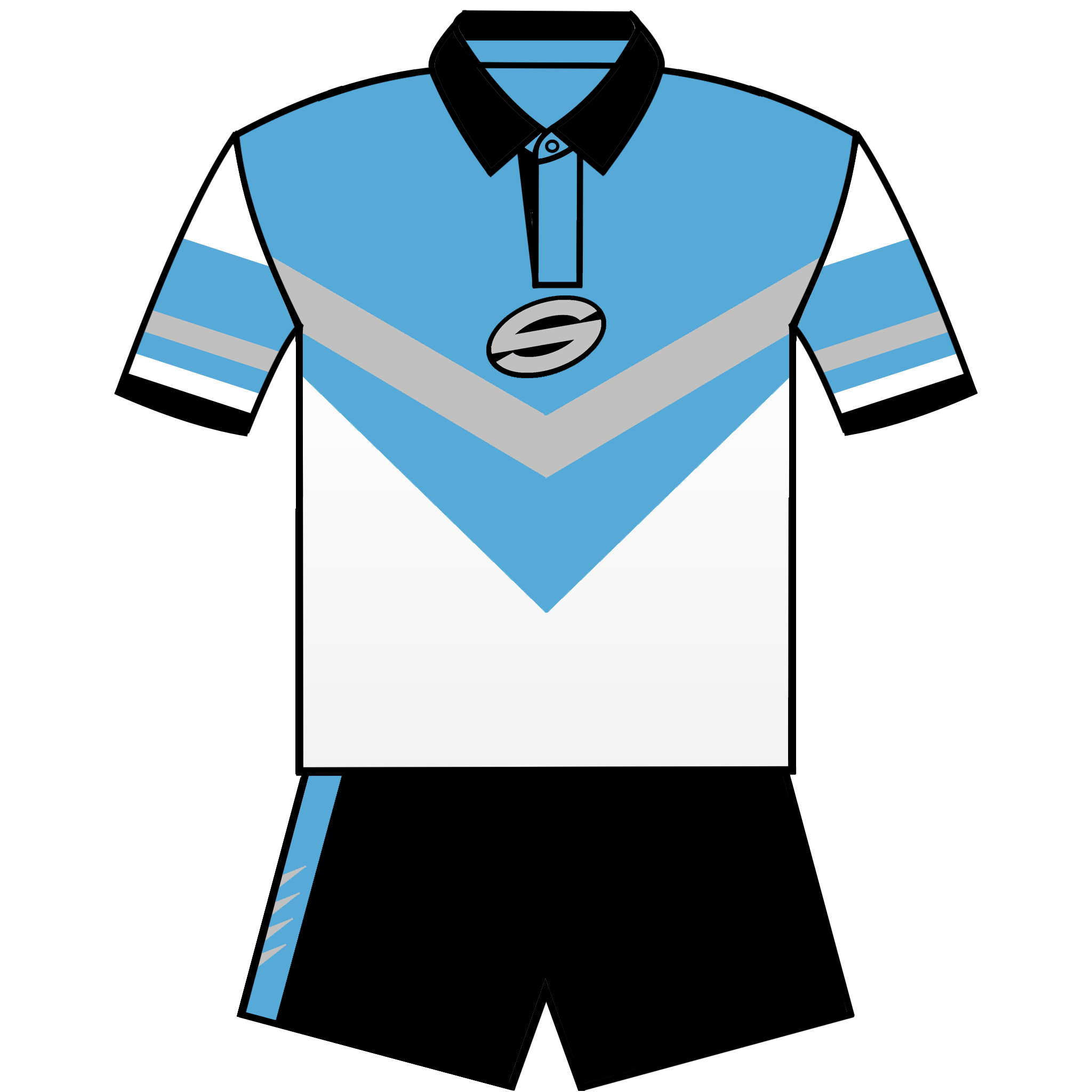
1997–2000

Cronulla's club song is known as Up Up Cronulla, and is set to the tune of Beer Barrel Polka (Roll Out The Barrel).

== Stadium ==
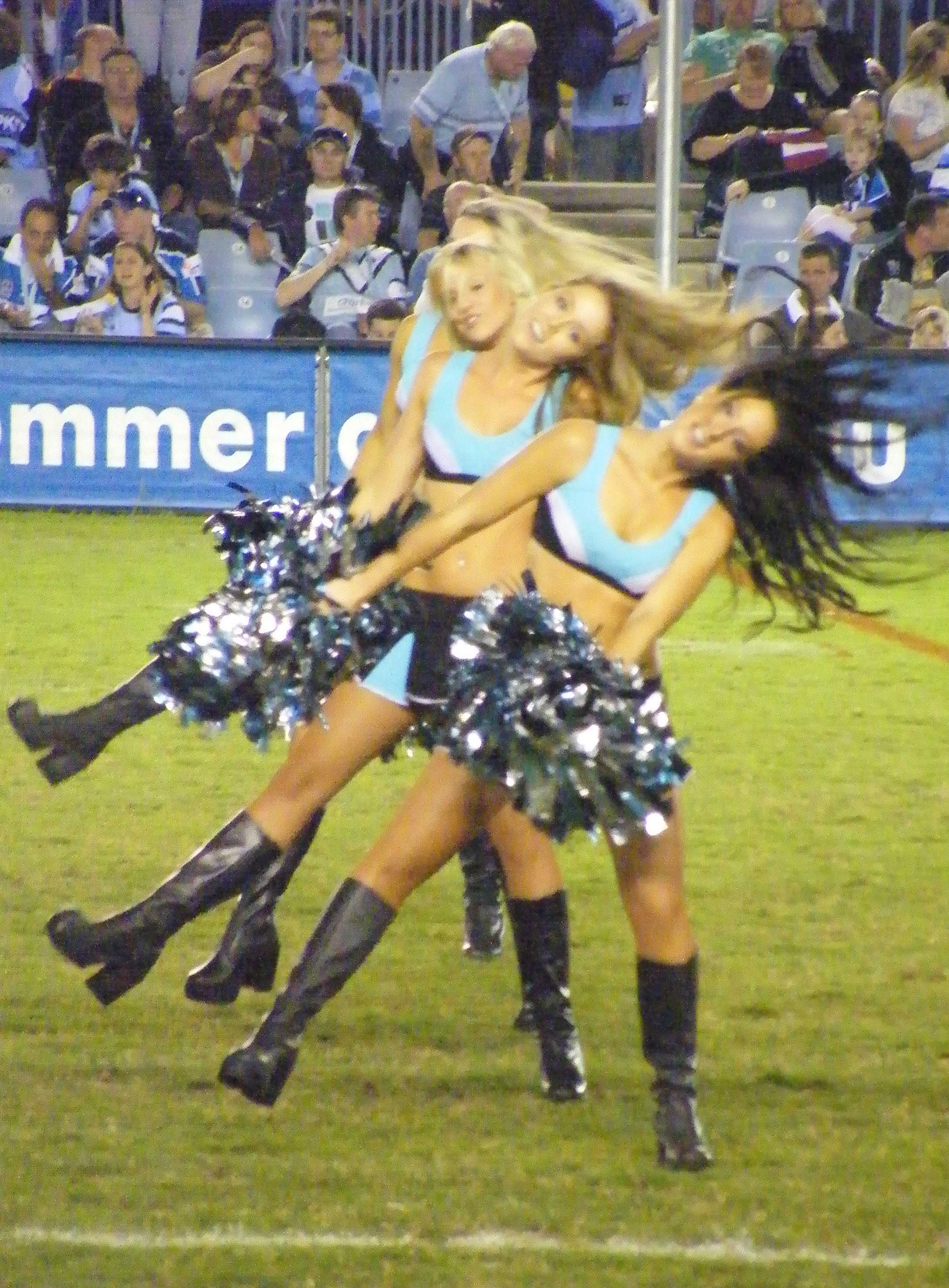
Cheerleaders cheering on the crowd at Endeavour Field.

When the Sharks entered the competition in 1967, they played their home games at Sutherland Oval. They only played there for two seasons with the Sharks winning their first game at the ground on 22 April 1967 NSWRFL season. The record attendance for Sutherland Oval was set in the last Cronulla game played at the ground when 12,578 saw the Sharks go down 32–4 to Canterbury Bankstown, then known as the Berries, now Bulldogs on 16 June 1968 NSWRFL season. Overall, the Sharks compiled a record of 4 wins, 11 losses and 1 draw at the venue.

In 1969, they then moved to Endeavour Field, where they have remained. This home ground has had numerous names over the years including Ronson Field, Shark Park, Toyota Park and until the end of 2012, Toyota Stadium. In 2013, it returned to the original name Endeavour Field. On 4 July 2013, the Cronulla Sharks announced their new stadium naming rights partner Remondis, an international waste solutions and management company.

In 2016 a new sponsorship deal for naming rights was signed with Southern Cross Group to name the stadium Southern Cross Group Stadium. The new partnership with Southern Cross Group (SCGroup) is a three-year deal, reportedly worth $1.5 million.

Southern Cross Group Stadium has a capacity of 22,000 people with the record attendance of 22,302 being set for a game against local rivals the St George Illawarra Dragons on 1 May 2004

== Sharkies Leagues Club ==
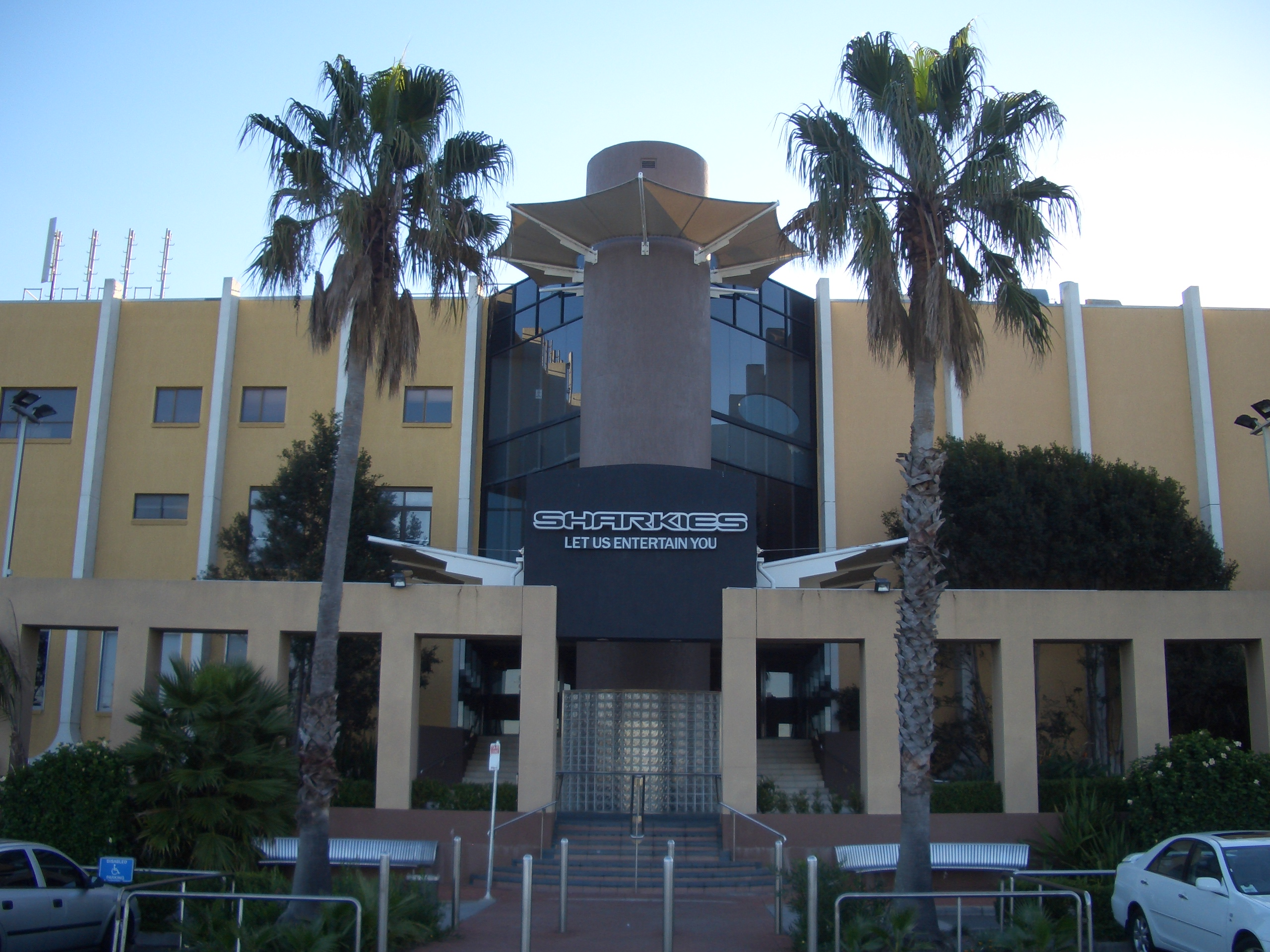
Sharkies Leagues Club

The Cronulla Sutherland Leagues Club is known as Sharkies, and is located on Captain Cook Drive at Woolooware. The leagues club sits beside the Cronulla Sutherland home ground, Endeavour Field.

Proposals to develop the land assets of the Leagues Club which owns the stadium and land around Endeavour Field stumbled for many years prior to arrival of renowned businessman Damian Irvine. In partnership with his head of finance Craig Douglas the plans finally became more tangible, as details of a residential and shopping centre were released. In August 2012, the club received final approval for their plans solving a 40-year-old problem of financial instability.

== 2026 squad ==
Cronulla Sharks 2026 squad
Top 30 squad - 2026 NRL season			Supplementary list	Coaching staff
Jayden Berrell – HK; Blayke Brailey (c) – HK; Billy Burns – SR; Jesse Colquhoun – LK; Addin Fonua-Blake – PR; Michael Gabrael – CE; Tuku Hau Tapuha – PR; Thomas Hazelton – PR; Blake Hosking – LK, SR; Nicho Hynes (vc) – HB	KL Iro – CE; Liam Ison – FB; Riley Jones – HK, FB; Sione Katoa – WG; Oregon Kaufusi – PR; William Kennedy – FB; Cameron McInnes (c) – LK; Ronaldo Mulitalo – WG; Briton Nikora – SR; Hohepa Puru – LK	Niwhai Puru – HB; Jesse Ramien – CE; Toby Rudolf – PR; Samuel Stonestreet – WG; Siosifa Talakai – SR, CE; Braydon Trindall – FE; Braden Uele – PR; Chris Vea'ila – CE; Teig Wilton – SR	Prestyn Laine-Sietu – CE; Riley Pollard – FE, HB	Head coach: Craig Fitzgibbon; Assistant coaches: Daniel Holdsworth; Frédéric Michalak; Steve Price; Matt Shirvington (Speed Coach); Tony Grimaldi (Strength & Conditioning Coach); Legend: (c) Captain(s); (vc) Vice-captain(s); Updated: 22 November 2026; Source(s): Sharks Team Profiles

== Players ==
=== Sharks Hall Of Fame ===
Name	Position	Years	Year Inducted
Tommy Bishop	Player-Coach	1969-74	2025 (Immortal)
Greg Pierce	Player/Coach	1969-80/1981-82	2025 (Immortal)
Steve Rogers	Player & CEO	1973-85	2025 (Immortal)
Gavin Miller	Player	1980-92	2025 (Immortal)
Andrew Ettingshausen	Player	1983-2000	2025 (Immortal)
Dane Sorensen	Player	1977-83/1985-89	2025
David Peachey	Player	1994-2005	2025
Mat Rogers	Player	1995-2001	2025
Jason Stevens	Player	1997-2005	2025
Paul Gallen	Player	2001-19	2025
Brett Kimmorley	Player	2002-08	2025

=== Club captains ===
Cap No.	Name	Years As Captain	Debut Round	Games As Captain
1.	Monty Porter	1967	Round 1	Unknown
2.	Warren Ryan	1967–68	Unknown	Unknown
3.	Noel Thornton	1968–69	Round 1	Unknown
4.	Graham Wilson	1969–70	Unknown	Unknown
5.	Tommy Bishop	1970–71, 1973	Round 1	Unknown
6.	George Taylforth	1970	Unknown	Unknown
7.	Kevin Hogan	1971	Unknown	Unknown
8.	Ron Turner	1971	Unknown	Unknown
9.	Greg Pierce	1972, 1974–80	Round 1	59^{1}
10.	Ken Maddison	1972, 1974	Unknown	Unknown
11.	Cliff Watson	1972–73	Unknown	Unknown
12.	John Maguire	1974–75	Unknown	Unknown
13.	Roger Millward	1976	Unknown	Unknown
14.	John McMartin	1977–79	Round 4	14
15.	Steve Rogers	1978–82, 1985	Round 14	120
16.	Dane Sorensen	1982–83, 1985	Round 19	5
17.	Gavin Miller	1983, 1989–92	Round 1	56
18.	Rowland Beckett	1983	Round 16	1
19.	Robert Lane	1983	Round 25	2
20.	George Moroko	1984	Round 1	7
21.	Greg Nixon	1984, 1986–87	Round 2	29
22.	David Hatch	1984–89	Round 2	121
23.	Mark Wakefield	1985	Round 15	2
24.	Jonathan Docking	1986–87	Round 6	3
25.	Michael Porter	1986–88, 1990	Round 14	5
26.	Andrew Ettingshausen	1990, 1992–93, 1995–2000	Round 22	122
27.	Mark McGaw	1991–92	Round 5	5
28.	Dan Stains	1992–94	Round 16	44
29.	Danny Lee	1994	Round 7	4
30.	Mitch Healey	1995–98, 2000	Round 4	17
31.	Les Davidson	1996	Round 11	1
32.	David Peachey	1998, 2000–05	Round 20	61
33.	Jason Stevens	2000–02	Round 15	12
34.	Andrew Pierce	2000	Round 16	1
35.	Chris Beattie	2002	Round 8	4
36.	Brett Kimmorley	2002–08	Round 12	91
37.	Danny Nutley	2004	Round 14	6
38.	Adam Dykes	2006–07	Round 6	6
39.	Nigel Vagana	2006	Round 10	1
40.	Paul Gallen	2007–09, 2011–19	Round 17	194
41.	Luke Covell	2007, 2009–10	Round 19	11
42.	Greg Bird	2008	Round 4	4
43.	Trent Barrett	2009–10	Round 5	29
44.	Luke Douglas	2010	Round 17	1
45.	Colin Best	2011	Round 11	1
46.	John Morris	2011, 2013	Round 11	4
47.	Jeremy Smith	2011–12	Round 17	8
48.	Wade Graham	2012–16, 2018–23	Round 18	118
49.	Todd Carney	2013	Round 19	1
50.	Jeff Robson	2013–14	Round 26	5
51.	Luke Lewis	2013, 2018	Round 26	2
52.	Michael Ennis	2016	Round 18	1
53.	Andrew Fifita	2018–19	Round 7	6
54.	Shaun Johnson	2020	Round 18	2
55.	Aaron Woods	2021	Round 6	13
56.	Dale Finucane	2022–2024	Round 1	22
57.	Nicho Hynes	2022	Round 7	8
58.	Cameron McInnes	2024–	Round 1	
59.	Blayke Brailey	2025-	Round 26	

^{1} – Unknown number of matches as captain between 1972 and 1976.

=== Dream Team ===
Announced 2006

Cronulla-Sutherland Sharks Dream Team
Starting 13	Reserves	Notes
1 David Peachey – FB; 2 Mat Rogers – WG; 3 Steve Rogers – CE; 4 Andrew Ettingshausen – CE; 5 Ray Corcoran – WG; 6 Michael Speechley – FE; 7 Tommy Bishop – HB; 8 Jason Stevens – PR; 9 Ron Turner – HK; 10 Cliff Watson – PR; 11 Ken Maddison – SR; 12 Gavin Miller – SR; 13 Greg Pierce – LK	14 Dane Sorensen; 15 Steve Kneen; 16 Brett Kimmorley; 17 Mark McGaw	Legend: (c) Captain(s); (vc) Vice-captain(s); Updated: 1 September 2006; Source(s):

=== Team of the Half Century ===
Announced 2017

Cronulla-Sutherland Sharks Team of the Half Century
Starting 13	Reserves	Coaching staff
1 David Peachey – FB; 2 Mat Rogers – WG; 3 Steve Rogers – CE; 4 Andrew Ettingshausen – CE; 5 Valentine Holmes – WG; 6 James Maloney – FE; 7 Tommy Bishop – HB; 8 Cliff Watson – PR; 9 Michael Ennis – HK; 10 Dane Sorensen – PR; 11 Greg Pierce – SR; 12 Gavin Miller – SR; 13 Paul Gallen – LK	14 Andrew Fifita; 15 Brett Kimmorley; 16 Steve Kneen; 17 Jason Stevens	Head coach: Shane Flanagan; Legend: (c) Captain(s); (vc) Vice-captain(s); Updated: 3 March 2017; Source(s):

=== Club Legends ===
Announced 2003

- Cliff Watson
- Greg Pierce
- Mark McGaw
- Steve Rogers
- Andrew Ettingshausen
- Mat Rogers
- Tommy Bishop
- Gavin Miller
- David Hatch
- David Peachey

=== Team of the Decade ===
Announced 2020

Cronulla Sharks Team of the Decade
First team squad	Interchange	Coaching staff
1 Ben Barba – FB; 2 Valentine Holmes – WG; 3 Jack Bird – CE; 4 Ricky Leutele – CE; 5 Sosaia Feki – WG; 6 James Maloney – FE; 7 Chad Townsend – HB; 8 Andrew Fifita – PR; 9 Michael Ennis – HK; 10 Matt Prior – PR; 11 Luke Lewis – SR; 12 Wade Graham – SR; 13 Paul Gallen (c) – LK	14 Jayson Bukuya – SR; 15 Kurt Capewell – SR; 16 Ben Ross – PR; 17 John Morris – HK	Legend: (c) Captain(s); (vc) Vice-captain(s); Updated: 4 May 2020; Source(s):

== Award winners ==
=== Dally M Medal ===
- Steve Rogers (1981)
- Gavin Miller (1988, 1989)
- Preston Campbell (2001)
- Nicho Hynes (2022)

=== Rothmans Medal ===
- Terry Hughes (1968)
- Ken Maddison (1973)
- Steve Rogers (1975)
- Barry Russell (1988)
- Gavin Miller (1989)
- Paul Green (1995)

=== Club Player of the Year (Porter Gallen Medal) ===
Year	Name	Position
1989	Gavin Miller	Second-row
1990	Andrew Ettingshausen	Centre
1991	Craig Dimond	Prop
1992	Danny Lee	Prop
1993	Not awarded	
1994	Andrew Ettingshausen	Centre
1995	Danny Lee	Prop
1996	Paul Donaghy	Centre
1997	David Peachey	Fullback
1998	Martin Lang	Prop
1999	David Peachey	Fullback
2000	David Peachey	Fullback
2001	Adam Dykes	Five-eighth
2002	Brett Kimmorley	Halfback
2003	Danny Nutley	Prop
2004	Jason Stevens	Prop
2005	Danny Nutley	Prop
2006	Greg Bird	Second-row
2007	Paul Gallen	Lock
2008	Paul Gallen	Lock
2009	Luke Douglas	Prop
2010	Paul Gallen	Lock
2011	Paul Gallen	Lock
2012	Jeremy Smith	Second-row
2013	Michael Gordon	Fullback
2014	Michael Gordon	Fullback
2015	Wade Graham	Second-row
2016	Andrew Fifita; Matt Prior	Prop; Prop
2017	Paul Gallen	Lock
2018	Valentine Holmes	Fullback
2019	Chad Townsend	Halfback
2020	Shaun Johnson	Halfback
2021	William Kennedy	Fullback
2022	Nicho Hynes	Halfback
2023	Blayke Brailey	Hooker
2024	Blayke Brailey	Hooker

=== Clive Churchill Medal ===
- Luke Lewis (2016)

=== Coaches register ===
Cap No.	Name	Years As Coach	Games As Coach	Win–loss record	Win %
1.	Ken Kearney	1967–69	66	14-1-51	21.2%
2.	Tommy Bishop	1970–73, 1980	114	55-2-57	48.3%
3.	Noel Thornton	1974	22	9-0-13	40.9%
4.	Johnny Raper	1975–76	44	18-2-24	40.9%
5.	Ted Glossop	1977	22	13-0-9	59.1%
6.	Norm Provan	1978–79	50	31-2-17	62%
7.	Greg Pierce	1981–82	49	26-2-21	53.1%
8.	Terry Fearnley	1983–84	50	22-1-27	44%
9.	Jack Gibson	1985–87	72	31-1-39	43.1%
10.	Allan Fitzgibbon	1988–91	92	50-5-37	54.4%
11.	Arthur Beetson	1992–93	44	17-0-27	38.6%
12.	John Lang	1994–01	198	128-5-87	58.2%
13.	Chris Anderson	2002–03	51	24-0-27	47.1%
14.	Stuart Raper	2004–06	73	31-0-43	41.9%
15.	Ricky Stuart	2007–10	91	38-0-53	41.8%
16.	Shane Flanagan	2010–13, 2015–18	185	102-2-82	54.8%
17.	Peter Sharp	2014	16	4-0-12	25%
18.	James Shepherd	2014	10	2-0-10	20%
19.	John Morris	2019–21	51	24-0-27	47.1%
20.	Josh Hannay	2021	19	8-0-11	42.1%
21.	Craig Fitzgibbon	2022–	67	42-0-25	62.7%
22.	Steve Price	2022	1	0-0-1	0%

== Honours ==
Premierships: 1 (2016)

Runners-Up: 3 (1973, 1978, 1997SL)

Minor Premierships: 2 (1988, 1999)

Wooden Spoons: 3 (1967, 1969, 2014)

Finals Appearances: 28 (1973, 1978, 1979, 1981, 1988, 1989, 1995, 1996, 1997, 1999, 2000, 2001, 2002, 2004, 2008, 2012, 2013, 2015, 2016, 2017, 2018, 2019, 2020, 2022, 2023, 2024, 2025, 2026)

Amco Cup: (1979)

== Head-to-head records ==
Opponent	Played	Won	Drawn	Lost	Win %
Titans	31	21	1	9	67.74
Cowboys	63	42	0	21	66.67
Warriors	53	31	0	22	58.49
Dragons	58	32	1	25	55.17
Eels	94	50	0	44	53.19
Rabbitohs	100	53	3	44	53.00
Raiders	87	44	0	43	50.57
Panthers	103	52	3	48	50.49
Knights	64	31	1	32	50.00
Tigers	40	19	1	20	47.50
Bulldogs	104	44	2	58	42.31
Dolphins	5	2	0	3	40.00
Roosters	108	38	2	68	35.19
Broncos	65	24	0	41	36.92
Storm	51	18	0	33	35.29
Sea Eagles	103	33	2	68	32.04

== Rivalries ==
=== Manly-Warringah Sea Eagles ===
This rivalry has been dubbed the "Battle of the Beaches", due to the geographical locations of the two clubs. Manly played the Sharks in two grand finals: 1973 and 1978, which are renowned for being the most brutal in history. Manly won both of these deciders, 10–7 in 1973 and 16–0 in the 1978 replay after the first game ended at 11-all. The Sea Eagles have traditionally had much success over the Sharks, with Cronulla winning at Manly's home ground just five times in their history. However the Sharks' biggest ever win came against Manly, a 68-6 thrashing in 2005. Cronulla and Manly play for the Steve Rogers Trophy when the two clubs meet in the NRL premiership each season. The two teams met in the 2013 finals, when Manly held off Cronulla by 24–18. Most recently the two teams met in the 2019 finals, when Manly beat Cronulla 28–16 at Brookvale Oval.

=== St. George Illawarra Dragons ===
Cronulla's fiercest rivalry is with their Southern Sydney neighbour, St George Illawarra Dragons. Cronulla's rugby league origins trace back to the St George junior system. When the Sharks were established in 1967, they emerged from the same southern Sydney region, leading to a natural rivalry. This close geographical and developmental relationship contributed to a "little brother" moniker being used.

This was further emphasised by the Dragons joint-venture with the Illawarra Steelers in 1998, effectively surrounding the Cronulla-Sutherland region geographically. On ANZAC Day 1999, Cronulla CEO Peter Gow famously cut up a St. George jersey with a pair of scissors in front of onlookers at Cronulla's leagues club and assaulted former St. George player Barry Beath who had become involved in the situation. Gow was later sacked by Cronulla for defacing the jersey and for assaulting a club patron.

Until 2020 the head-to-head match-up between the two clubs was surprisingly even; the Sharks would win 10 matches straight against the Dragons between 2020 and 2025. The two teams always lift the intensity when they meet, which has led to some classic matches over the years. In the 1999 preliminary final, Cronulla-Sutherland had won the minor premiership and looked like cruising to the grand final, before St George Illawarra scored 24 unanswered second half points to win 24–8. They would meet again in the finals in 2002, with Cronulla winning 40–24, and again in 2005 when St George Illawarra won 28–22. In round 18 of the 2023 NRL season, Cronulla recorded their biggest ever victory over either St. George or St. George Illawarra defeating the latter 52-16.

=== Melbourne Storm ===
A fairly recent rivalry that reached its height in the 2016 NRL Grand Final which was won by Cronulla.

Round 2 of the 2008 NRL season saw the sides meet at Olympic Park in Melbourne, and Cronulla was able to reverse the previous season's result by the same scoreline (17-16) via a Brett Kimmorley field goal. The match was marred by an ugly brawl which saw Cronulla's Ben Ross and Melbourne's Brett White sent from the field. It was the only loss Melbourne suffered at home during the 2008 regular season.

The two sides met again in the preliminary final where Melbourne, despite missing captain Cameron Smith to suspension, defeated Cronulla 28–0 to advance to the grand final against Manly-Warringah.

Melbourne began the 2012 NRL season with nine straight victories, before a Paul Gallen-less Sharks pipped them 12-10 thanks to a Jeremy Smith try and clutch conversion from Todd Carney. It looked like Cronulla would land two wins over Melbourne that year, leading 18–10 with 90 seconds to go in the second game between the sides. Melbourne somehow scored twice to win 20–18.

The competitive rivalry between the two sides escalated in late 2015 when Melbourne beat Cronulla 30–2 in spiteful circumstances. Cronulla coach Shane Flanagan accused Melbourne of slowing down the game with their wrestling tackle technique. The loss meant that Melbourne leap-frogged Cronulla into 4th place heading into the finals. Again Cronulla-Sutherland handed Melbourne their first loss of the 2016 NRL season, winning the round 4 clash 14–6. It was the first match in Cronulla's record-breaking 15 match winning streak.

The two sides would meet in the final round of the regular season with the winner taking out the minor premiership. Melbourne won 26-6 and took out the JJ Giltinan Shield. However, Cronulla-Sutherland would win the biggest game ever between the two sides 4 weeks later, winning the 2016 grand final by 14–12 in a thriller.

The two teams traded close wins in 2017, with Cronulla winning 11–2 at AAMI Park before Melbourne returned serve with an 18–13 victory at Southern Cross Group Stadium. 2018 saw Cronulla win both encounters with Melbourne during the regular season, yet despite this, lost to them in the preliminary final 22 to 6.

The match featured a controversial moment when Melbourne player Billy Slater made an illegal tackle on Cronulla winger Sosaia Feki while he was in the act of scoring, therefore constituting a professional foul. Slater managed to avoid the Sin Bin despite being penalised for the action, as well as avoiding suspension, with the NRL judiciary controversially ruling that the tackle did not constitute a shoulder charge. Their round 4 clash in 2018 saw a record 33 penalties blown, and Cameron Smith was sin-binned for the first time in his career.

In the 2021 NRL season, former Melbourne player Will Chambers signed a contract to join Cronulla-Sutherland which closed the chapter of the two sides competitive rivalry. Chambers had previously labelled Cronulla captain Paul Gallen and other Cronulla players as "Drug Cheats" during a 2017 game between the two sides.

More recent notable encounters include finals matches in 2024 and 2025, both won by Melbourne (37-10 and 22-14 respectively).

== Supporters ==
The Cronulla-Sutherland Sharks receive support from groups of fans, including the "Cronulla-Sutherland Supporters Club", supporter's website "Sharks Forever", and fan forum "Sharks Forever".

Cronulla-Sutherland Sharks fans became widely known for the 'Spirit Fingers', when someone has a Place kick.

Notable Celebrity Supporters of the club:

- Lara Bingle, Australian model and actress
- John Boldeman, Australian nuclear scientist
- Stuart Clark, former Australian cricketer
- Bill Collins, Australian film critic and author
- Peter Costello, former Federal Treasurer of Australia
- Brendan Cowell, Australian actor, screenwriter, comedian and director
- Dave Faulkner, Australian rock musician
- Cathy Freeman, Australian former sprinter
- Samuel Johnson, Australian actor, radio presenter, voiceover artist and philanthropist
- Brendan Jones, Australian radio presenter
- Daniel MacPherson, Australian actor and television presenter
- Elle Macpherson, Australian model
- Glenn McGrath, former Australian international cricketer and commentator
- Scott Morrison, 30th Prime Minister of Australia
- Shannon Noll, Australian singer-songwriter
- Mark Occhilupo, Australian surfer
- Glenn Wheeler Australian radio personality
- Markus Zusak, Australian writer
