= Peter Sharp (rugby league) =

Australian RL coach

Personal information
- Born: 16 July 1954 (age 72) Newcastle, New South Wales, Australia

Coaching information
Club
Years	Team	Gms	W	D	L	W%
1999	Manly Sea Eagles	17	9	1	7	53
2000–02	Northern Eagles	76	30	1	45	39
2003	Manly Sea Eagles	24	7	0	17	29
2006–08	Hull F.C.	68	38	3	27	56
2014	Cronulla Sharks	16	4	0	12	25
	Total	201	88	5	108	44
- Source: As of 7 October 2017

Peter Sharp (born 16 July 1954) is an Australian professional rugby league coach. He was most recently the interim coach of the Cronulla-Sutherland Sharks in the National Rugby League.

== Coaching career ==
Sharp has been the head coach of the Northern Eagles and Manly-Warringah from 1999 to 2003. He has also been an assistant coach at the Parramatta Eels, Newcastle Knights and the Melbourne Storm.

Sharp signed with Hull F.C. in April 2006, on a two-and-a-half-year contract. He replaced sacked coach John Kear., Sharp left the club in 2008 by mutual consent after the club won only 4 of their opening 14 games of the season.

In 2008 he switched to rugby union, joining Ulster as defence coach until September 2009.

Sharp joined Cronulla-Sutherland as assistant coach after the end of the 2011 season. After the suspension handed to Shane Flanagan for twelve months for his role in the club's supplements scandal, Sharp was elevated to the role of caretaker coach, despite his reluctance to coach in the NRL again. He resigned from this role on 1 July 2014, with James Shepherd to assume this role until Flanagan returns from his suspension.
