= James Shepherd (rugby league) =

Australian RL coach and former rugby league footballer

Personal information
- Born: 10 July 1973 (age 53) Sydney, New South Wales, Australia

Playing information
- Position: Wing
Club
Years	Team	Pld	T	G	FG	P
1992–94	Eastern Suburbs	6	3	6	0	24

Coaching information
Club
Years	Team	Gms	W	D	L	W%
2014	Cronulla Sharks	10	2	0	8	20
- Source: As of 23 December 2018

James Shepherd (born 10 July 1973) is an Australian former professional rugby league footballer in the National Rugby League in Australia. In 2014, he served briefly as the head coach of the Cronulla-Sutherland Sharks rugby league team following the resignation of Peter Sharp, who was filling in for the suspended Shane Flanagan. Shepherd later became an Assistant Coach at the St George Illawarra Dragons.

== Teaching career ==
=== St Patricks High School at Sutherland ===
Shepherd was a part of the college as a teacher of many subjects, primarily Personal Development, Health and Physical (PDHPE). He also coached MCC Rugby League teams.

== NRL career ==
=== Playing ===
Shepherd played for the Eastern Suburbs Roosters first grade team on six occasions from 1992 until 1994.

=== Coaching ===
==== Early career ====
Shepherd joined the Wests Tigers in 2004 as coach of the Jersey Flegg (under 20's) team. He stayed there until the end of 2007. He then joined the Melbourne Storm (in 2008 and 2009) as their Recruitment Consultant. In 2011, he joined the Cronulla-Sutherland Sharks as the Toyota Cup coach.

==== NRL ====
In 2014 he was elevated to head coach of the Cronulla Sharks first grade side following the resignation of caretaker coach Peter Sharp. He served in this role until head coach Shane Flanagan returned from his twelve-month suspension at the end of that season. In his first match in charge the Sharks came from 24–0 down in the first half to defeat the reigning premiers Sydney Roosters 30–28 in what was described as "One of the most incredible victories in the history of the Cronulla club – and quite possibly the NRL." They won the match despite having captain Paul Gallen and senior player Luke Lewis unavailable for selection due to State of Origin commitments and despite having terminated the contract of key playmaker Todd Carney in the week preceding the match in addition to it being Shepherd's debut.

In 2018, he joined the Newcastle Knights coaching staff as an assistant coach. Following the departure of Nathan Brown of Head Coach of the Newcastle Knights in 2019, Shepherd was released from his contract at the conclusion of the 2019 NRL Season.

On 8 November 2019, it was announced the Shepherd was joining St. George Illawarra as an Assistant Coach.
