= List of Gold Coast Chargers players =

This is a list of rugby league footballers who have played first grade for the Gold Coast Chargers. Players are listed in the order they made their debut.

== Players ==
Club
No.	Name	Career	Appearances	Tries	Goals	Field goals	Points
1	Wayne Alberts	1988	4	0	0	0	0
2	Geoff Bagnall	1988−1991	55	3	0	0	12
3	Russell Browning	1988	4	0	0	0	0
4	Chris Close	1988−1991	67	4	0	0	16
5	Jim Cowell	1988−1990	36	1	0	0	4
6	Michael Eden	1988−1989	31	4	61	4	142
7	Billy Johnstone	1988−1990	61	7	0	0	28
8	Eric Kennedy	1988−1989	10	0	0	0	0
9	Bennett King	1988	10	1	0	0	4
10	Troy McCarthy	1988−1993	45	5	22	0	64
11	Scott Mieni	1988−1990	42	10	0	0	40
12	Tony Rampling	1988	1	0	0	0	0
13	Mark Ross	1988−1991	49	10	0	0	40
14	Paul Sheahan	1988	1	0	0	0	0
15	Robert Simpkins	1988−1991	72	1	0	0	0
16	Peter Smith	1988−1989	25	0	0	0	0
17	Greg Whitbread	1988−1991	52	3	0	0	12
18	Glenn Burgess	1988−1989	16	1	0	0	4
19	David Chapman	1988−1991	30	0	0	0	0
20	Mark Gee	1988−1991	38	3	0	0	12
21	Ben Gonzales	1988−1991	58	12	0	0	48
22	Joe Vitanza	1988−1989	27	1	0	0	4
23	Michael Searle	1988−1995	55	7	0	0	28
24	Gary Charlton	1988	1	0	0	0	0
25	Danny Sharpe	1988−1991	12	2	0	0	8
26	Neil Hunt	1988−1989	23	5	0	0	20
27	Brett Williams	1988	1	0	0	0	0
28	Ron Gibbs	1988−1990	56	6	0	0	24
29	Keith Neller	1988−1992	46	3	0	0	12
30	Damian Kenniff	1988−1989	6	0	0	0	0
31	Warren Black	1988−1989	4	0	0	0	0
32	Brett Rolls	1988−1991	37	2	21	1	51
33	Paul Stewart	1988	1	0	0	0	0
34	Bradley Garrett	1988	1	0	0	0	0
35	Steve Halliwell	1988	2	0	0	0	0
36	Neil James	1988	2	0	0	0	0
37	Paul Upfield	1988	1	0	0	0	0
38	Peter Benson	1989−1990, 1994	39	8	36	0	104
39	Terry Dardengo	1989−1990	19	3	1	0	14
40	Bob Lindner	1989	10	0	0	0	0
41	Richie Poulsen	1989	5	0	0	0	0
42	Scott Savimaki	1989	2	0	0	0	0
43	Artie Harrington	1989	1	0	0	0	0
44	Graham Steadman	1989	5	1	0	0	4
45	Brett Horsnell	1989−1994	82	4	0	0	16
46	Tony Durheim	1989−1998	78	2	0	0	8
47	Phil Daley	1990−1991	20	0	0	0	0
48	Brett French	1990−1991	35	11	0	0	44
49	Keith Gee	1990−1991	25	1	0	0	4
50	Robert Grogan	1990	17	4	0	0	16
51	Clinton Mohr	1990−1994	82	19	0	0	76
52	Paul Shaw	1990−1991	28	1	0	0	4
53	Dale Massie	1990	1	0	0	0	0
54	Brett Ross	1990−1991	9	1	0	0	4
55	Jeremy Ticehurst	1990	11	1	0	0	4
56	Eddie Fallins	1990−1991, 1994−1995	32	6	0	0	24
57	Kevin Marr	1990	4	0	0	0	0
58	Dean Sampson	1990	8	0	0	0	0
59	Gary Divorty	1990	5	0	0	0	0
60	Alan Kempnich	1990, 1994	6	0	1	0	2
61	Steve Weston	1990−1993	14	2	11	0	30
62	Derek McVey	1990	1	1	0	0	4
63	Wayne Bartrim	1991−1994	77	18	76	0	224
64	Ray Herring	1991−1994	56	9	0	0	36
65	Wally Lewis	1991−1992	34	6	3	0	30
66	Danny Peacock	1991−1995	67	28	0	0	112
67	Terry Cook	1991−1994	56	5	0	0	20
68	Pat O'Doherty	1991	7	0	0	0	0
69	Robin Thorne	1991−1994	44	7	0	0	28
70	David King	1991−1992	8	0	0	0	0
71	Daryl Powell	1991	13	1	0	0	4
72	Paul Dixon	1991	10	1	0	0	4
73	Scott Freestone	1991−1995	36	5	0	0	20
74	Iain Wood	1991−1992	5	0	1	0	2
75	Paul Bishop	1991	3	0	0	0	0
76	Larry Corowa	1991	2	1	0	0	4
77	Mick Davis	1991−1993	12	0	0	0	0
78	Heath Lewis	1991	1	0	0	0	0
79	Jason McDonald	1991	2	1	3	0	10
80	Peter Gill	1992−1995	67	9	0	0	36
81	Steve Jackson	1992−1993	24	6	1	0	26
82	Paul Martin	1992−1993	37	8	0	0	32
83	Dale Shearer	1992−1994	33	3	17	0	48
84	Ian Stains	1992	4	0	0	0	0
85	Brent Todd	1992−1993	34	1	1	0	6
86	Jason Twist	1992−1993	13	2	0	0	8
87	Darren Wolens	1992−1996	45	3	0	0	12
88	Mike McLean	1992	16	1	0	0	4
89	Matt Donovan	1992	10	1	0	0	4
90	Ken Jackson	1992−1993	12	1	1	0	6
91	Paul Galea	1992−1994	18	1	0	0	4
92	Ali Davys	1992−1993	30	1	0	0	4
93	Robert Tocco	1992−1994	19	0	0	0	0
94	Michael Jenkins	1992	12	0	0	0	0
95	Craig Weston	1992−1993	31	6	20	0	64
96	Jamie Goddard	1992−1998	86	23	0	0	92
97	Scott Sattler	1992−1993, 1997−1998	6	1	0	0	4
98	Andrew Whittington	1992−1994	20	1	0	0	4
99	Kevin Thompson	1992	1	1	0	0	4
100	Jason Hetherington	1993	15	3	0	0	12
101	John Skardon	1993−1994	27	7	0	0	28
102	Adrian Vowles	1993−1994	38	6	7	0	38
103	Kevin Campion	1993−1995	44	3	6	0	24
104	Dean Scott	1993−1994	8	2	0	0	8
105	Russell Bussian	1993−1994	13	7	0	0	28
106	Leigh Groves	1993−1994	5	0	0	0	0
107	David Bouveng	1993−1994	22	7	0	0	28
108	Andrew Dunemann	1993−1995	20	1	0	0	4
109	Craig Coleman	1994−1995	44	4	0	0	16
110	Dave Woods	1994−1995	42	3	0	0	12
111	Shane Kenward	1994−1996	26	6	0	0	24
112	Brendan Hurst	1994−1997	74	8	125	3	285
113	Adrian Brunker	1994−1995	22	3	2	0	16
114	Jamie Day	1994	8	0	0	0	0
115	Don Saunders	1994	1	0	0	0	0
116	Anthony Fowler	1994	1	0	0	0	0
117	Jeremy Schloss	1994−1997	51	14	0	0	56
118	David Baildon	1995−1996	25	6	0	0	24
119	Steve Deacon	1995	9	1	0	0	0
120	Brett Gillard	1995−1996	28	3	0	0	12
121	Ian Graham	1995	5	0	0	0	0
122	Andrew Hodge	1995	10	2	0	0	8
123	Brian Quinton	1995	2	0	0	0	0
124	Mark Ramage	1995	2	0	0	0	0
125	Des Clark	1995−1996	5	0	0	0	0
126	Tim Patterson	1995	16	5	0	0	20
127	Tim Fuller	1995−1996	14	0	3	0	6
128	Scott Wilson	1994−1995	17	5	0	0	20
129	Grant Adamson	1995	1	0	0	0	0
130	Ben Ikin	1995	8	0	1	0	2
131	Craig Spark	1995	10	0	0	0	0
132	Jim Lenihan	1995	6	2	0	0	8
133	Chris Orr	1995−1997	27	2	0	0	8
134	Colin Ward	1995	12	0	0	0	0
135	Rick McGrady	1995	6	3	2	0	16
136	Andrew King	1995−1998	49	10	0	0	40
137	Stuart Kelly	1995	4	0	0	0	0
138	Steve Parsons	1995−1998	29	2	0	0	8
139	Martin Bella	1996−1997	35	2	0	0	8
140	Kris Currie	1996−1998	28	6	0	0	24
141	Damian Driscoll	1996−1998	57	2	0	0	8
142	Craig Grauf	1996	6	1	0	0	4
143	Jeff Orford	1996	13	2	0	0	8
144	Brett Plowman	1996−1997	27	3	0	0	12
145	Michael Salafia	1996	1	0	0	0	0
146	Pat Savage	1996	5	0	0	0	0
147	Dave Watson	1996	16	6	0	0	24
148	Gavin Whittaker	1996−1998	31	3	2	0	16
149	Lee Oudenryn	1996	18	8	3	0	38
150	Matthew Ralph	1996	1	0	0	0	0
151	Stuart Topper	1996	9	0	0	0	0
152	Jason Nicol	1996−1998	51	15	0	0	60
153	Henry Suluvale	1996−1998	19	3	0	0	12
154	Rod Stone	1996	3	0	0	0	0
155	Kevin Ellis	1996	3	1	0	0	4
156	Robert Campbell	1996	4	0	0	0	0
157	John McKelleher	1996−1997	20	3	0	0	12
158	Doug Evans	1996	5	0	0	0	0
159	Kieran Meyer	1996	1	0	0	0	0
160	Chris Nahi	1996−1998	46	6	0	0	24
161	Peter Lima	1996	2	0	0	0	0
162	Darren Anderson	1997	9	1	7	0	18
163	Graham Mackay	1997−1998	43	15	42	0	144
164	Wes Patten	1997−1998	43	16	0	1	65
165	Shane Russell	1997−1998	19	10	0	0	40
166	Scott Zahra	1997−1998	6	0	0	0	0
167	Matt Dwyer	1997	7	1	0	0	4
168	Michael Goodrich	1997−1998	2	0	0	0	0
169	Marcus Bai	1997	18	5	0	0	20
170	Tom O'Reilly	1997−1998	34	7	0	0	28
171	Craig Bowen	1997	1	1	0	0	4
172	Hamish Smith	1997	1	0	0	0	0
173	Keith Blackett	1997	7	1	0	0	4
174	Frank Napoli	1997	1	0	0	0	0
175	Dave Clark	1997	4	1	0	0	4
176	Clayton Maher	1997	4	0	0	0	0
177	Preston Campbell	1998	14	4	0	0	16
178	Troy Campbell	1998	3	0	0	0	0
179	Scott Conley	1998	17	0	0	0	0
180	Heath Cruckshank	1998	16	1	0	0	4
181	Glen Godbee	1998	2	0	0	0	0
182	Brendon Lindsay	1998	4	2	0	0	8
183	Clinton O'Brien	1998	18	0	0	0	0
184	Craig Teevan	1998	22	2	0	0	8
185	Aaron Douglas	1998	5	3	0	0	12
186	Chris Lawler	1998	2	0	0	0	0
187	Danny McAllister	1998	16	1	0	0	4
188	David Myles	1998	17	5	0	0	20
189	Jason Hudson	1998	17	4	0	0	16
190	Scott Thorburn	1998	9	0	7	0	14
191	Richie Allan	1998	8	0	2	1	5
192	Jared Fox	1998	1	0	0	0	0
193	Adam Hutchinson	1998	2	1	0	0	4
194	Cameron Durnford	1998	4	0	0	0	0
