= History of the Gold Coast Titans =

The History of the Gold Coast Titans begins with the formation of the Titans club, an entirely separate entity to the Chargers club, which exited the NRL after 11 seasons from 1988 to 1998.

== History of the Titans' bid ==
In 2003 Michael Searle and Paul Broughton began pushing for the reinstatement of a Gold Coast Team in the National Rugby League in 2006. In the second quarter of 2004 the Gold Coast Consortium, as they had become known, announced their team name and jersey at the Gold Coast Convention and Exhibition Centre during an episode of Channel 9's The Footy Show. The team was to be known as the Gold Coast Dolphins and their colours would be white, jade and orange. The Dolphins moniker was very popular, however the Redcliffe Dolphins, which is the Queensland Cup's most successful team, threatened legal action if the Dolphins name was used in the Gold Coast team.

In mid-2004 the NRL announced that after viewing submissions from the Gold Coast Dolphins, the Central Coast Bears and the Wellington Orcas (Killer Whales) bids, there would not be a 16th team in the 2006 NRL Competition. The major hurdles for the Gold Coast team, which was by far the favourite to get the nod if the 16th licence was granted, was the use of the Dolphins name, and that their home ground, Carrara Stadium, was an oval and only seated 16,000.

== Acceptance ==
Since the rejection of the Gold Coast's bid in 2004, the consortium did not give up in their quest for a Gold Coast NRL team. They dropped the Dolphins nickname, and the Queensland Government announced that they would spend $100 million on a new, rectangular stadium for the Gold Coast Team, should they be accepted. On 27 May 2005, the NRL CEO David Gallop announced that the Gold Coast had been accepted into the 2007 NRL competition. On the same night, an NRL match between the Bulldogs and North Queensland Cowboys was played on the Gold Coast Stadium. This coincided with the announcing of a new television deal with Channel 9, taking effect from 2007.

== Search for a name ==
The Gold Coast RLFC, along with a Gold Coast radio station, set up a competition where listeners could submit possible names for the new team. This was shortlisted into 10 names, and people could vote on which of the ten they most preferred on the team's then-website, www.goldcoastrugbyleague.com.au

These 10 names were narrowed down to 3, which were:

- Gold Coast Titans
- Gold Coast Stingers
- Gold Coast Pirates

The most popular name was the Titans, and the team name Gold Coast Titans was announced on 21 September 2005.

== Inaugural season ==
On 18 March 2007 the Titans played their first official NRL match a the St George Illawarra Dragons in front of over 42,000 speople at Suncorp Stadium in Brisbane but after falling 14 points behind in the second half 20-6 they couldn't manage a full comeback losing a tight match 20–18. Past Queensland State of Origin winger Chris Walker who was released by Melbourne Storm in 2006 started his comeback scoring two tries and three conversations for a 14-point haul.
