= Ryan Simpkins (rugby league) =

Australian rugby league footballer (born 1988)

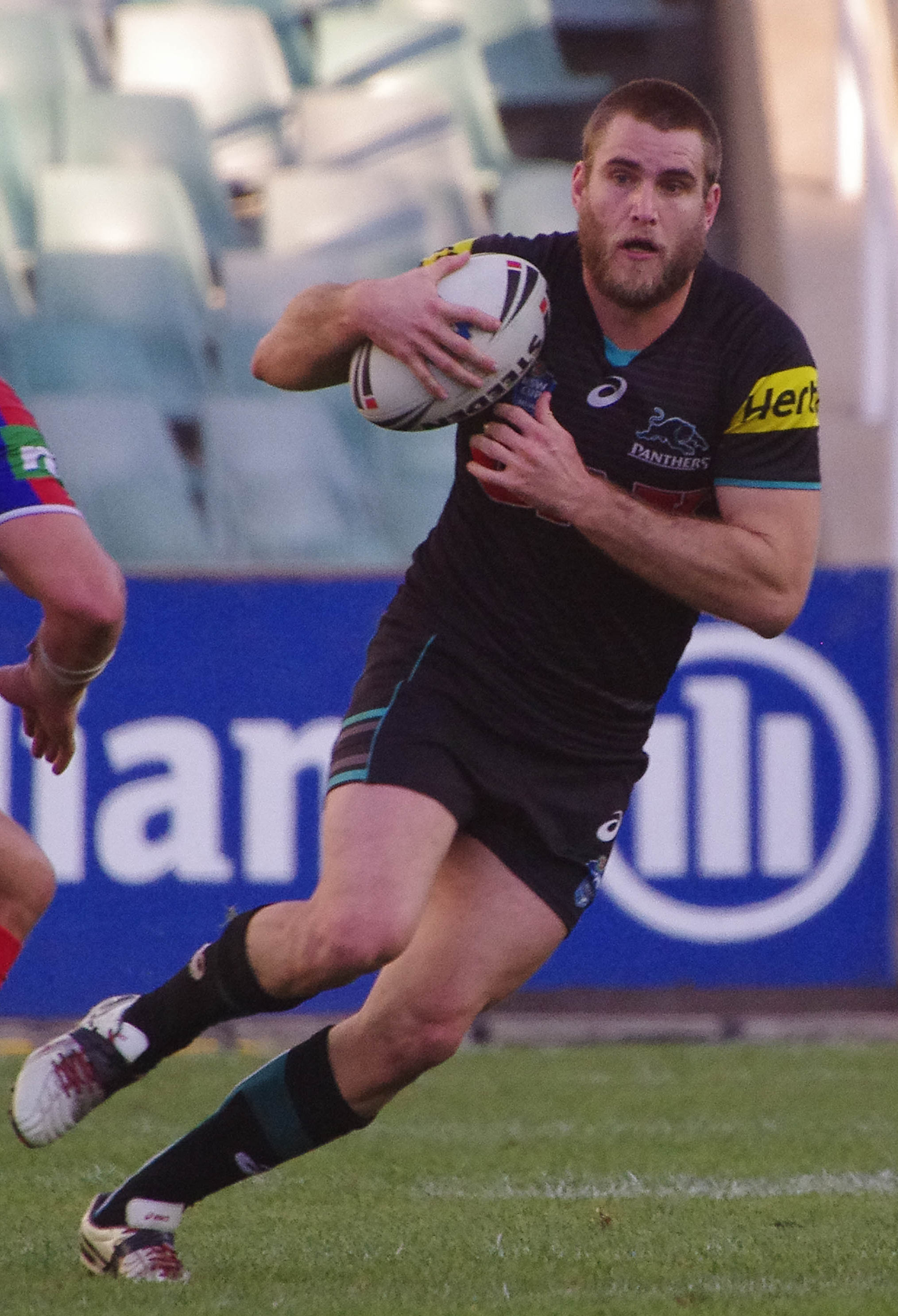
- Simpkins playing for the Panthers in 2014.

Personal information
- Born: 20 September 1988 (age 38) Tweed Heads, New South Wales, Australia
- Height: 186 cm (6 ft 1 in)
- Weight: 96 kg (15 st 2 lb)

Playing information
- Position: Lock, Second-row, Hooker
Club
Years	Team	Pld	T	G	FG	P
2012–13	Penrith Panthers	27	3	0	0	12
2015–18	Gold Coast Titans	25	0	0	0	0
	Total	52	3	0	0	12
Representative
Years	Team	Pld	T	G	FG	P
2010–11	Queensland Residents	2	1	0	0	4
- Source: As of 5 January 2024
- Father: Robert Simpkins

Ryan Simpkins (born 20 September 1988) is an Australian former professional rugby league footballer who played for the Penrith Panthers and Gold Coast Titans in the National Rugby League. He played as a lock, second-row and hooker.

== Background ==
Born in Tweed Heads, New South Wales, Simpkins played his junior football for the Currumbin Eagles, Tugun Seahawks and came up through the Tweed Heads Seagulls Colts system before being signed by the Gold Coast Titans.

== Playing career ==
In 2008, Simpkins captained the Gold Coast Titans' NYC team before moving on to the Titans' Queensland Cup team, Tweed Heads Seagulls in 2009.

In 2010 and 2011, Simpkins played for the Queensland Residents.

Early in September 2011, Simpkins signed a 1-year contract with the Penrith Panthers starting in 2012.

On 25 September 2011, Simpkins played in the Seagulls' 2011 Queensland Cup Grand Final loss to the Wynnum Manly Seagulls.

In Round 3 of the 2012 NRL season, Simpkins made his NRL debut for Penrith against the South Sydney Rabbitohs.

After coming off the bench for the first six games of his career, Simpkins started at second-row against the St. George Illawarra Dragons and scored his first NRL try in Penrith's 13-12 golden point victory.

On 21 September 2014, Simpkins was named at lock in the 2014 NSW Cup Team of the Year.

On 28 September 2014, Simpkins played in Penrith's 2014 New South Wales Cup Grand Final win over the Newcastle Knights, also playing in the Panthers' 2014 NRL State Championship loss to the Northern Pride RLFC on 5 October 2014.

On 9 October 2014, Simpkins signed a 2-year contract with the Gold Coast Titans to return to his original club starting in 2015.

Simpkins retired from rugby league following the conclusion of the 2018 NRL season.

== Personal life ==
Simpkins is the son of former South Sydney Rabbitohs, Sydney Roosters and Gold Coast Chargers player Robert Simpkins.
