= Steve Parsons (rugby league) =

Australian rugby league footballer

Personal information
- Born: 27 February 1974 (age 51)

Playing information
- Position: Prop
Club
Years	Team	Pld	T	G	FG	P
1995–98	Gold Coast Chargers	29	2	0	0	8
1999	North Sydney Bears	3	1	0	0	4
	Total	32	3	0	0	12

Steve Parsons is an Australian former rugby league footballer who played in the 1990s. He played for the Gold Coast and North Sydney in the New South Wales Rugby League (NSWRL) competition, ARL and NRL competitions.

== Playing career ==
Parsons made his first grade debut for the Gold Coast Seagulls as they were then known against Canterbury-Bankstown in round 19 1995 at the Seagulls Stadium.

Following the conclusion of the 1995 season, The Seagulls brand was liquidated and resurrected briefly as The Gladiators and then as The Chargers. In 1996, Parsons played in England for Keighley Cougars.

In 1997, Parsons played in the Gold Coast's first ever finals campaign. Parsons featured in both matches, the qualifying final victory over the Illawarra Steelers and the semi-final defeat against Eastern Suburbs.

The following year in 1998, Parsons played in what was to be the Gold Coast's last season. Parsons played in the Gold Coast's final game as a club which came in round 24 1998 against Cronulla-Sutherland at Carrara Stadium.

After the liquidation of the Gold Coast, Parsons signed for North Sydney. Parsons scored a try for Norths in their final home game at North Sydney Oval in the top grade as they defeated Melbourne 24–20. The following week, Parsons played in what would be North Sydney's final game as a first grade team when they faced off against the North Queensland Cowboys at the Dairy Farmers Stadium in Townsville. Norths would win the match 28–18. Following the conclusion of the 1999 NRL season, Norths controversially merged with rivals Manly-Warringah to form the Northern Eagles as part of the NRL's rationalisation strategy. Parsons was not offered a contract to play with the newly formed team for the 2000 NRL season.
