= Scott Conley =

Scott Conley may refer to:

- Scott Conley (American football) (born 1947), American football coach
- Scott Conley (rugby league) (born 1973), Australian rugby league footballer who played in the 1990s
