= Tony Durheim =

Australian rugby league footballer

Personal information
- Born: 21 July 1967 (age 58) Brisbane, Queensland, Australia

Playing information
- Position: Second-row
Club
Years	Team	Pld	T	G	FG	P
1989–98	Gold Coast Chargers	78	2	0	0	4
- Source: As of 5 November 2019

Tony Durheim (born 21 July 1967) is an Australian former professional rugby league footballer who played in the 1980s and 1990s. He played for the Gold Coast (Queensland) in the New South Wales Rugby League (NSWRL) competition, ARL and NRL competitions. Durheim was one of the club's longest serving players and oversaw a number of name changes in his nine years with the team.

== Playing career ==
Durheim made his first grade debut for the Gold Coast in round 21 1989 against Cronulla-Sutherland at Seagulls Stadium coming off the bench in an 8-4 victory.

At the end of the 1989 season, the Gold Coast as they were then known by the name "Gold Coast/Tweed Heads Giants" became bankrupt and were quickly remodeled as the Gold Coast Seagulls for the 1990 season. Under the Seagulls brand, the club finished last in 1991, 1992, 1993 and narrowly avoided the wooden spoon in 1994 and 1995.

In 1996, the Gold Coast briefly became known as "The Gladiators" before becoming "The Chargers". After years of being one of the easy beats in the competition, the Gold Coast finished 7th in 1997 and qualified for their first finals appearance. Durheim missed out on playing in the finals due to injury.

In the 1998 NRL season, Durheim played 13 games for the Gold Coast in what would prove to be their last season as a club. Durheim played in the Gold Coast's final game which came against Cronulla-Sutherland at Carrara Stadium in round 24 1998. Following the conclusion of the season, the Gold Coast were liquidated and Durheim retired as a player.
