= Jamie Goddard =

Australian rugby league player

Personal information
- Born: 18 July 1972 (age 54) Mount Isa, Queensland, Australia
- Height: 177 cm (5 ft 10 in)
- Weight: 87 kg (192 lb; 13 st 10 lb)

Playing information
- Position: Hooker
Club
Years	Team	Pld	T	G	FG	P
1992–98	Gold Coast	86	23	0	0	92
1999	North Sydney	24	7	0	0	28
2000–02	Northern Eagles	50	4	0	0	32
	Total	160	34	0	0	152
Representative
Years	Team	Pld	T	G	FG	P
1997–98	Queensland	4	0	0	0	0

Jamie Goddard (born 18 July 1972) is an Australian former professional rugby league footballer who played as a hooker in the 1990s and 2000s.

He played club football for the Gold Coast Seagulls/Chargers, the North Sydney Bears and the Northern Eagles. Goddard was also selected for the Queensland Maroons on four occasions, three of them starting at hooker.

== Background ==
Goddard was born in Mount Isa, Queensland, Australia.

== Early years ==
Goddard first played junior football at the age of 13 with Brothers Mount Isa. He was playing with the Queensland Under 19s team when spotted by the Gold Coast team.

== Gold Coast ==
In 1992, Goddard made his debut with the Gold Coast Seagulls in a 26–6 win over Parramatta Eels, but it was to be his only appearance for the season. In 1993 and 1994, he made a handful of appearances, mostly from the bench, but it wasn't until 1995 that cemented his position at hooker, winning the job from Eddie Fallins.

Goddard played with Gold Coast Chargers, as they became known, captaining the club until their exit from the competition at the end of the 1998 NRL season. He holds the club record for most first grade matches (86), and was a member of the first Gold Coast team to make, and win, a semi-final during the split 1997 season in which they defeated the Illawarra Steelers 25–14. His team-mates included Marcus Bai, Wes Patten, Martin Bella and Scott Sattler.

== North Sydney and Northern Eagles ==
With the closure of the Chargers, Goddard signed with North Sydney Bears for the 1999 season. He started from the bench in his first game, behind Mark Soden, but was the starting hooker for the remainder of the year, scoring 7 tries. Goddard played in Norths final ever game as a first grade side which was a 28–18 victory against North Queensland in Townsville.

With the merger between Norths and Manly in 2000, Goddard found himself playing with the newly formed Northern Eagles. He played 50 games with the Eagles, mostly starting from the bench in the first 2 seasons. Goddard was starting at hooker in 2002, but at the end of that season Manly dissolved their relationship with the Bears, and Goddard retired.

== Representative ==
Goddard played 4 games for the Queensland Maroons. He played in all 3 games in the 1997 series, when many of Queensland's stars were playing in the rival Super League Tri-series. Queensland lost the series 2–1. The next year he played hooker in the series-deciding third match, which Queensland won. Goddard never played Origin football again, though he was named in the 22-man squad as late as 2002.

Goddard's contribution is perhaps best remembered for a fight he had with Andrew Johns during the third match of the 1997 series, when he knocked Johns to the ground and Johns required 27 stitches.

== Sources ==
- Alan Whiticker & Glen Hudson (2007). The Encyclopedia of Rugby League Players. Wetherill Park, New South Wales: Gary Allen Pty Ltd. ISBN 978-1-877082-93-1.
