= Don Saunders =

Australian rugby league footballer

Playing information
- Position: Lock, Five-eighth, Centre
Club
Years	Team	Pld	T	G	FG	P
1994	Gold Coast Seagulls	1	0	0	0	0
1997	South Queensland	13	0	0	0	0
	Total	14	0	0	0	0
- Source: RLP As of 16 December 2020

Don Saunders is an Australian former professional rugby league footballer who played in the 1990s.

Primarily a lock, Saunders played for the Gold Coast Seagulls and South Queensland Crushers in the Australian Rugby League.

== Background ==
Saunders played his junior rugby league for the Toowoomba All Whites. His nephew, Tom Dearden, is a professional rugby league player for the North Queensland Cowboys.

== Playing career ==
In Round 10 of the 1994 NSWRL season, Saunders made his first grade debut for the Gold Coast Seagulls, coming off the bench in their 12–30 loss to the South Sydney Rabbitohs at the Sydney Football Stadium. It was his only appearance for the club.

In 1996, Saunders played for the Toowoomba Clydesdales in the inaugural season of the Queensland Cup. On 31 August 1996, he captained the Clydesdales in their 8–6 Grand Final win over the Redcliffe Dolphins.

In 1997, Saunders joined the South Queensland Crushers, playing 13 games for the club that season.

In 1998, he returned to the Clydesdales, playing three more seasons at the club. In 2004, he played for the Central Comets. In 2006, he was named at lock in the Queensland Cup Team of the Decade.

== Post-playing career ==
Following his retirement, Saunders taught and coached at Mackay State High School and Palm Beach Currumbin State High School. In 2010, he was on the coaching staff for the Gold Coast Titans NRL Under-20s team.
