= Joe Vitanza =

Australian rugby league footballer

Personal information
- Full name: Joseph Vitanza
- Born: 16 May 1963 (age 62) Sydney, New South Wales, Australia

Playing information
- Position: Prop, Second-row
Club
Years	Team	Pld	T	G	FG	P
1984–87	Penrith Panthers	35	3	0	0	12
1988–89	Gold Coast Giants	27	1	0	0	4
1990–91	Penrith Panthers	28	0	0	0	0
1992	Cronulla Sharks	1	0	0	0	0
	Total	91	4	0	0	16
- Source: As of 9 April 2019

Joe Vitanza (born 16 May 1963) is an Australian former rugby league footballer who played in the 1980s and 1990s. He played for the Penrith Panthers, Gold Coast Giants and Cronulla-Sutherland Sharks in the New South Wales Rugby League (NSWRL) competition. Vitanza was a foundation player for Gold Coast, playing in the club's first season.

== Background ==
Vitanza played his junior rugby league for St Dominic's before being graded by Penrith.

== Playing career ==
Vitanza made his first grade debut for Penrith against St George in Round 1 1984 at Penrith Park. Vitanza missed the entire 1985 season before returning to the first grade team in 1986.

In 1988, Vitanza joined the newly admitted Gold Coast side and was a foundation player for the club making 15 appearances in their inaugural season. Vitanza played one more season with the Gold Coast before returning to Penrith.

In 1990, Vitanza made 21 appearances for Penrith as the club reached their first ever grand final against the Canberra Raiders. Vitanza played from the bench as Penrith were defeated 18-14 after he loses the ball forward that led to Matthew Wood's winning try in the dying minutes. The following year, Vitanza only managed to make 7 appearances and was not selected in the club's maiden premiership victory against Canberra.

In 1992, Vitanza joined Cronulla-Sutherland and ironically only made one appearance which was against his former club Penrith in Round 21 1992.
