= Steve Halliwell (rugby league) =

English rugby league footballer

Personal information
- Full name: Stephen Halliwell
- Born: 13 March 1962 (age 63) Ince district, England

Playing information
- Position: Centre
Club
Years	Team	Pld	T	G	FG	P
1981	St. George Dragons	1	0	0	0	0
1982–83	Parramatta Eels	3	2	0	0	8
1984	Penrith	3	0	0	0	0
1985–86	Leigh	46	49	0	0	0
1986	St. Helens	22	16	0	0	64
1986–88	Wakefield Trinity	40	16	4	0	72
1988	Gold Coast Chargers	2	0	0	0	0
	Total	117	83	4	0	144

Stephen Halliwell (born 13 March 1962) is an English-born Australian professional rugby league footballer who played in the 1980s. He played at club level for the St. George Dragons, the Parramatta Eels, Leigh, St. Helens, Wakefield Trinity, and the Gold Coast Chargers, as a centre. Steve Halliwell was the vice-captain of the Australian Schoolboys rugby union tours of New Zealand and Ireland in 1980.

== Genealogical information ==
Steve Halliwell was born in Ince district, Lancashire, England.

== Genealogical information ==
Steve Halliwell is the son of rugby league wing/centre of the 1950s and 1960s who played for Wigan; Frank Halliwell.
