= Des Clark =

Australian rugby league footballer

Personal information
- Full name: Des Clark
- Born: 4 March 1972 (age 54) Toowoomba, Queensland, Australia

Playing information
- Position: Second-row, Prop
Club
Years	Team	Pld	T	G	FG	P
1994	North Sydney Bears	1	0	0	0	0
1994	Balmain Tigers	13	0	0	0	0
1995–97	Gold Coast	27	2	0	0	8
1998–99	Halifax Blue Sox	51	8	0	0	32
1999	St Helens	4	0	0	0	0
2000	North Qld Cowboys	2	0	0	0	0
	Total	98	10	0	0	40
- Source: As of 15 January 2019

Des Clark (born 4 March 1972) is an Australian former rugby league footballer. A journeyman second-row or prop, he played for the North Sydney Bears, Balmain Tigers, Gold Coast Chargers, Halifax Blue Sox, St. Helens and North Queensland Cowboys during his seven-year career.

== Playing career ==
Originally from Toowoomba, Queensland, Clark joined the Western Suburbs Magpies in 1991 but did not play first grade for the club. In 1993, Clark joined the North Sydney Bears. In Round 5 of the 1994 NSWRL season Clark made his first grade debut in the Bears' 36–8 win over the Gold Coast Seagulls. Later that season, Clark made a mid-year switch to the Balmain Tigers, playing 10 games for them that season.

In 1995, Clark joined the Gold Coast Seagulls (and later Chargers), playing 27 games for the club over three seasons. In 1997, Clark played in the Chargers' first finals series, scoring a try in their major qualifying final loss to the Sydney City Roosters.

In 1998, he signed with the Halifax Blue Sox for the 1998 Super League season. Clark played 27 games for Halifax that season, scoring five tries. Clark played 24 games for Halifax in the 1999 season, before making a late season move to St. Helens. He left St Helens during their run to the Grand Final to join French club AS Carcassonne.

In 2000, Clark returned to Australia, playing two games for the North Queensland Cowboys.

== Statistics ==
=== NSWRL/ARL/NRL ===
Statistics are correct to the end of the 2000 season

Season	Team	Matches	T	G	GK %	F/G	Pts
1994	North Sydney	1	0	0	—	0	0
1994	Balmain	13	0	0	—	0	0
1995	Gold Coast	3	0	0	—	0	0
1996	Gold Coast	12	1	0	—	0	4
1997	Gold Coast	12	1	0	—	0	4
2000	North Queensland	2	0	0	—	0	0
Career totals		43	2	0	—	0	8

=== Super League/Challenge Cup ===
Season	Team	Matches	T	G	GK %	F/G	Pts
1998	Halifax	27	6	0	—	0	24
1999	Halifax	24	2	0	—	0	8
1999	St. Helens	4	0	0	—	0	0
Career totals		55	8	0	—	0	32
