= Peter Smith (rugby league, born 1958) =

Australian rugby league footballer

Personal information
- Born: 25 November 1958 (age 66)

Playing information
- Position: Second-row, Prop
Club
Years	Team	Pld	T	G	FG	P
1979–80	Canterbury Bulldogs	19	0	0	0	0
1982–83	South Sydney	29	2	0	0	6
1984–86	Illawarra Steelers	38	0	0	0	0
1986–87	Leeds	25	0	0	0	0
1988–89	Gold Coast-Tweed Giants	25	0	0	0	0
	Total	136	2	0	0	6

Peter Smith is an Australian former professional rugby league footballer who played in the 1970s and 1980s. He played for the Gold Coast, Canterbury-Bankstown, South Sydney and Illawarra in the New South Wales Rugby League (NSWRL) competition. Smith also played for Leeds in England.

== Playing career ==
Smith made his first grade debut for Canterbury-Bankstown in round 13 1979 against North Sydney at North Sydney Oval. Canterbury would go on to reach the 1979 NSWRL Grand Final against St. George but were defeated 17–13 at the Sydney Cricket Ground. Smith played at second-row in the match.

In 1980, Smith missed out on playing in Canterbury's premiership winning team which defeated Eastern Suburbs in the grand final but he did play in the reserve grade premiership team which defeated Parramatta.

In 1982, Smith joined South Sydney after finding opportunities limited at Canterbury. Smith spent two years at Souths where he found more game time before signing with Illawarra.

Smith spent three seasons at Illawarra, in two of those three seasons the club finished last on the table. During the off season, Smith spent one year with Leeds in England before returning to Australia and signing with the new Gold Coast team which were admitted into the competition for the 1988 season.

Smith played in the club's first game which came against his former club Canterbury in round 1 1988 at the Seagulls Stadium and ended in a 21–10 loss. Smith spent two years at the Gold Coast where they narrowly avoided the wooden spoon before retiring.
