= Chris Lawler (rugby league) =

Australian rugby league footballer

Personal information
- Full name: Chris Lawler
- Born: 8 February 1971 (age 55)

Playing information
- Position: Five-eighth, Halfback, Wing
Club
Years	Team	Pld	T	G	FG	P
1994–97	Parramatta Eels	48	17	98	0	264
1998	Gold Coast	2	0	0	0	0
	Total	50	17	98	0	264

Chris Lawler (born 8 February 1971) is an Australian former professional rugby league footballer who played in the 1990s. He played for the Parramatta Eels, and the Gold Coast Chargers. He mostly played at Five-Eighth, but also played at halfback or on the wing.

Lawler made his debut for Parramatta in round 2 of the 1994 season against the Balmain Tigers. In 1998, Lawler moved to the Gold Coast Chargers and played two games for the club before retiring at the end of the season.
