= Dave Woods (rugby league, born 1966) =

Australian rugby league footballer

Personal information
- Full name: David Woods
- Born: 6 April 1966 Sydney, New South Wales, Australia
- Died: 1 January 1996 (aged 29) Gold Coast, Queensland, Australia

Playing information
- Position: Prop, Second-row
Club
Years	Team	Pld	T	G	FG	P
1988–89	Western Suburbs	42	3	0	0	12
1990	Canberra Raiders	12	0	0	0	0
1991	Newcastle Knights	12	0	0	0	0
1992–93	Canberra Raiders	13	2	0	0	8
1994–95	Gold Coast	42	9	0	0	36
	Total	121	14	0	0	56
- Source: As of 25 January 2019

David Woods (6 April 1966 – 1 January 1996) was an Australian professional rugby league footballer who played in the 1980s and 1990s. He played for the Western Suburbs Magpies from 1988 to 1989, the Canberra Raiders 1990, 1992 and 1993, the Newcastle Knights in 1991 and finally the Gold Coast Seagulls from 1994 to 1995.

Woods was found dead in a car at Burleigh Heads, Queensland on New Year's Day, 1996. Police advised there were no suspicious circumstances to his death.

== Playing career ==
Woods made his first-grade debut for Western Suburbs in 1988. Woods made 22 appearances in his debut year, but Western Suburbs finished last on the table, claiming the wooden spoon.

In 1990, Woods joined Canberra and played 12 games in their premiership winning season but did not play in the grand final victory over the Penrith Panthers.

In 1991, Woods joined Newcastle before returning to Canberra in 1992. In 1994, Woods joined the Gold Coast and spent two years with them as they struggled near the foot of the table.
