= Shane Russell =

Australian rugby league footballer

Personal information
- Born: 18 September 1973 (age 51)

Playing information
- Position: Wing
Club
Years	Team	Pld	T	G	FG	P
1994–95	Balmain	18	9	0	0	36
1996	Parramatta	8	2	0	0	8
1997–98	Gold Coast	19	10	0	0	40
	Total	45	21	0	0	84

Shane Russell (born 18 September 1973) is an Australian former professional rugby league footballer who played for the Balmain Tigers, Parramatta Eels and Gold Coast Chargers.

== Playing career ==
A winger, Russell started his career at Balmain, making his first-grade debut in 1994. He crossed to Parramatta for the 1996 ARL season, then went north to join the Gold Coast the following year.

Russell hold Gold Coast's record for most tries in a match, which he achieved on his club debut, against Western Suburbs at Campbelltown in the opening round of the 1997 season.
