= Steve Deacon =

Australian rugby league footballer

Personal information
- Born: 23 November 1967 (age 58) Sydney, New South Wales, Australia

Playing information
- Height: 178 cm (5 ft 10 in)
- Weight: 90 kg (14 st 2 lb)
- Position: Wing, Centre
Club
Years	Team	Pld	T	G	FG	P
1989–93	Eastern Suburbs	40	7	6	0	40
1995	Gold Coast Seagulls	9	1	0	0	4
	Total	49	8	6	0	44

Steve Deacon (born 23 November 1967) is an Australian former professional rugby league footballer who played in the 1980s, and 1990s. He played at club level for the Eastern Suburbs and the Gold Coast Seagulls, as centre, but also as a wing.

== Playing career ==
Deacon was graded by the Eastern Suburbs Roosters in 1987. He played in the Roosters' 1988 Presidents Cup grand final loss to the Parramatta Eels. He made his first grade debut from the bench against the Canberra Raiders at Seiffert Oval in round 18 of the 1989 season. Deacon made his first appearance at centre in his sides' 42-12 loss against the Parramatta Eels in round 14 of the 1990 season.

Deacon would make regular appearances for the Roosters in the 1990 and 1991 seasons. In the 1992 season, the Roosters dominated the early part of the season winning all of their first five games, Deacon was a key ingredient to his side's early season success, but injuries to key players including Deacon himself would see the Roosters' finals hopes slip and eventually they ended up missing out on finals. Injuries would limit Deacon's first grade appearances to just six games in the 1992 season. Deacon's stint with the Roosters ended at the conclusion of the 1993 season.

In 1995, Deacon joined the Gold Coast Seagulls. He retired at the end of the 1995 season. His last game was against the Canberra Raiders at Bruce Stadium in which his side lost 56-6. In total Deacon played 49 games, and scored 8 tries, and kicked 6 goals.
