= Troy Campbell =

Australian rugby league footballer

Personal information
- Full name: Troy Campbell
- Born: 31 July 1972 (age 52); Orange, New South Wales, Australia

Playing information
- Position: Second-row, Hooker
Club
Years	Team	Pld	T	G	FG	P
1994–97	Parramatta Eels	63	3	0	0	12
1998	Gold Coast Chargers	3	0	0	0	0
	Total	66	3	0	0	12

Troy Campbell (born 31 July 1972) is an Australian former professional rugby league footballer who played as a second-row and hooker for the Parramatta Eels and the Gold Coast Chargers in the 1990s.

== Playing career ==
Campbell made his debut for Parramatta in Round 17 of the 1994 season against the Balmain Tigers. At Parramatta, Campbell was awarded the 1996 Mick Cronin Clubman of the Year award and helped the club to the 1997 World Sevens title, where he was named player of the series. In 1998, Campbell moved to the Gold Coast Chargers and played three games before retiring at the end of the season.
