= Ben Gonzales =

Filipino rugby league footballer

Personal information
- Full name: Benito Gonzales
- Born: 17 March 1965 (age 60); Quezon City, Philippines

Playing information
- Position: Wing
Club
| Years | Team | Pld | T | G | FG | P |
|---|---|---|---|---|---|---|
| 1984–87 | Penrith Panthers | 73 | 23 | 0 | 0 | 92 |
| 1988–91 | Gold Coast Seagulls | 58 | 12 | 0 | 0 | 48 |
| | Total | 131 | 35 | 0 | 0 | 140 |

Ben Gonzales (born 17 March 1965), also known by the nickname of "Speedy", is a Filipino-born Australian former professional rugby league footballer who played in the 1980s and 1990s. He played with the Penrith Panthers and the Gold Coast Giants. He played primarily as a winger and occasionally as a centre.

== Background ==
Gonzales was born in Quezon City, Philippines. He is of Spanish Mestizo descent.

== Playing career ==
Gonzales was a Penrith junior. He made his first grade debut for the Panthers in his side's 20−8 loss to the Canterbury Bulldogs at Belmore Sports Ground in round 7 of the 1984 season. 1984 was a season of change for the Panthers, under new coach Tim Sheens they went within one game of making their first ever finals appearance in the club's history.

Gonzales had his best season at the Panthers in 1985. He played in 25 of his side's 26 games and scored 11 tries which included a hat-trick against the Canberra Raiders in round 5. The Panthers would eventually finish as finalists at the end of the 1985 season. Gonzales played in both the playoff for fifth spot against the Manly Sea Eagles in which the Panthers won 10−7, and in the Panthers' first ever finals appearance in which they lost 38−6 to the Parramatta Eels at the SCG. Gonzales would not play in another finals match. His stint with the Panthers ended at the conclusion of the 1987 season.

In 1988, Gonzales joined the newly formed Gold Coast Giants later renamed as the Seagulls and Chargers. Gonzales was a foundation player for the club and despite missing their first ever match, a 21–10 loss to Canterbury at Seagulls Stadium, he played in the remaining 21 games for the Giants in their inaugural season. In 1989, Gonzales played in all 22 of his side's games. Gonzales played a further 2 seasons for Gold Coast and retired at the end of 1991. His final game came in his side's 32−10 loss to the North Sydney Bears at North Sydney Oval in the final round of the 1991 season. In total, Gonzales played 135 games and scored 40 tries.
