= Andrew Hodge (rugby league) =

Australian rugby league footballer

Personal information
- Full name: Andrew Hodge

Playing information
- Position: Wing
Club
Years	Team	Pld	T	G	FG	P
1995	Gold Coast	10	2	0	0	8
1996	Newcastle Knights	2	0	0	0	0
	Total	12	2	0	0	8
- Source: As of 7 February 2019

Andrew Hodge is an Australian former professional rugby league footballer who played in the 1990s. He played for the Gold Coast Seagulls in 1995 and the Newcastle Knights in 1996.

== Playing career ==
Hodge made his first grade debut for the Gold Coast against North Sydney at North Sydney Oval in Round 1 1995 which ended in a 50–10 loss.

In 1996, Hodge joined Newcastle and made only 2 appearances. His final game in first grade was a 34–30 loss against St George in Round 3 1996.
