= Greg Whitbread =

Australian rugby league footballer

Playing information
- Position: Second-row, Prop
Club
Years	Team	Pld	T	G	FG	P
1986–87	Canterbury Bulldogs	8	1	0	0	4
1988–91	Gold Coast Seagulls	52	3	0	0	12
	Total	60	4	0	0	16
- Relatives: Jai Whitbread (son)

Greg Whitbread is an Australian former professional rugby league footballer who played in the 1980s and 1990s. He played for the Gold Coast and Canterbury-Bankstown in the New South Wales Rugby League (NSWRL) competition. He is the father of current NRL player Jai Whitbread.

== Playing career ==
Whitbread joined Canterbury in 1985 and made his first grade debut for the club in round 4 1986 against Penrith at Belmore Oval. This was Whitbread's only appearance for Canterbury in the top grade and he was not included in the grand final team which lost to Parramatta.

In 1987, Whitbread made 7 appearances for Canterbury's first team but spent much of his time in reserve grade. Whitbread was released at the end of 1987 after making a total of 56 appearances for the club across all grades. In 1988, Whitbread signed for the newly admitted Gold Coast team who were then known as the Gold Coast-Tweed Giants.

Whitbread played in the club's first game which came against his former club Canterbury in round 1 1988 at the Seagulls Stadium and ended in a 21–10 loss. At the end of the 1989 season, the Giants licence collapsed and they were bought out by the Seagulls Leagues club who changed the club's name to the Gold Coast Seagulls. Despite the name change, the Gold Coast struggled on the field and in Whitbread's final year at the club they finished last on the table after winning two matches all year.
