= Kris Currie =

Australian rugby league player

Personal information
- Born: 15 May 1973 (age 53) Gold Coast, Queensland, Australia
- Height: 190 cm (6 ft 3 in)
- Weight: 100 kg (15 st 10 lb)

Playing information
- Position: Centre
Club
| Years | Team | Pld | T | G | FG | P |
|---|---|---|---|---|---|---|
| 1996–98 | Gold Coast Chargers | 28 | 6 | 0 | 0 | 24 |

Kris Currie (born 15 May 1973) is an Australian professional rugby league player who played during the 1990s. He played for the Gold Coast Chargers. His position of choice was centre.

== Playing career ==
Currie was a Gold Coast junior. In 1996, he joined the Gold Coast Chargers. Currie made his first grade debut in his side's 42−26 loss to the North Sydney Bears at Carrara Stadium in round 1 of the 1996 season. He made 21 appearances for the Chargers in his debut season and scored 5 tries. He made 7 more first grade appearances in his final two seasons with the Chargers. Currie was a member of the Chargers' last ever game in first grade which was a 20−18 loss to the Cronulla Sharks at Carrara Stadium. The Gold Coast club folded at the end of the 1998 season due to the rationalization of the competition during this time.

In 1999, Currie joined the Penrith Panthers. He never made a first grade appearance for the Panthers, and was subsequently released by the Panthers at the end of the season and never played first grade rugby league again. In total, Currie played 28 first grade games and scored 6 tries.
