= Brett Gillard =

Australian rugby league footballer

Personal information
- Full name: Brett Gillard
- Born: 6 June 1970 (age 54)
- Height: 179 cm (5 ft 10 in)
- Weight: 94 kg (207 lb; 14 st 11 lb)

Playing information
- Position: Lock, Second-row
Club
Years	Team	Pld	T	G	FG	P
1989–93	Eastern Suburbs	40	2	0	0	8
1993–94	Penrith Panthers	16	1	0	0	4
1995–96	Gold Coast	28	3	8	0	12
1997	South Sydney	7	0	0	0	0
	Total	91	6	8	0	24

Brett Gillard is an Australian former rugby league footballer who played as a back-row forward in the 1980s and 1990s.

After making his first-grade debut for the Eastern Suburbs Roosters in 1989, he played in 40 matches for the club before moving to the Penrith Panthers part-way through the 1993 season. He spent two seasons at Penrith before moving to the Gold Coast Seagulls/Chargers for seasons 1995 and 1996. Gillard finished his playing career with the South Sydney Rabbitohs in 1997.

Gillard in currently associated with one of Eastern Suburbs junior clubs, the Clovelly Crocodiles, in a junior development role.
