= Heath Cruckshank =

Australian rugby league player

Personal information
- Full name: Heath Cruckshank
- Born: 28 June 1976 (age 48); Brisbane, Queensland, Australia

Playing information
- Position: Second-row
Club
Years	Team	Pld	T	G	FG	P
1997	South Queensland Crushers	2	0	0	0	0
1998	Gold Coast Chargers	16	1	0	0	4
2000	Leigh Centurions	1	1	0	0	4
2001	Sheffield Eagles	1	0	0	0	0
2001	St. Helens R.F.C.	15	0	0	0	0
2003	Halifax Panthers	21	0	0	0	0
2004	Leigh Centurions	1	0	0	0	0
	Total	57	2	0	0	8

Heath Cruckshank (born 28 June 1976) is an Australian former professional rugby league footballer who played during the 1990 and 2000s. He played for the South Queensland Crushers, Gold Coast Chargers, Leigh Centurions, Sheffield Eagles, St. Helens R.F.C., and Halifax Panthers. His position of choice was second-row.

== Playing career ==
Cruckshank was graded by the now defunct South Queensland Crushers in 1996. He made his first grade debut in his side's 14−6 loss to the Illawarra Steelers at WIN Stadium in round 5 of the 1997 season. His only other match for the Crushers came in their 52−10 loss to the Parramatta Eels in round 13 of the 1997 season. The Crushers picked up a second successive wooden spoon and folded at the end of the season.

After the liquidation of South Queensland, Cruckshank joined the Gold Coast Chargers. Cruckshank was a member of the Chargers' last ever game in first grade which was a 20−18 loss to the Cronulla Sharks at Carrara Stadium. The Gold Coast club folded at the end of the 1998 season due to the rationalization of the competition during this time. In total, he played 18 games and scored 1 try.

In 2000, Cruckshank joined English Super League side Leigh Centurions. He would play the remainder of his career with Sheffield Eagles, St. Helens R.F.C., Halifax Panthers, followed by a second stint with Leigh Centurions. After playing 39 games and scoring one try in his English Super League career, Cruckshank retired at the end of the 2004 Super League season.
