= Brendan Hurst =

Australian rugby league footballer

Personal information
- Full name: Brendan Hurst
- Born: 1 April 1972 (age 52); Ipswich, Queensland, Australia

Playing information
- Position: Lock Forward
Club
Years	Team	Pld	T	G	FG	P
1994–97	Gold Coast	74	8	125	3	285
1998–00	Sydney Roosters	21	1	0	0	4
	Total	95	9	125	3	289
- Source: As of 2 May 2020

Brendan Hurst (born 1 April 1972) is a former professional rugby league player who played for the Gold Coast Chargers and Sydney Roosters from 1994 to 2000. Hurst is the leading point-scorer in the history of the original Gold Coast incarnations.

== NRL career ==
Hurst debuted for the Gold Coast Seagulls in 1994, becoming the leading points-scorer in the clubs' 11-year tenure in the NSWRL/ARL. Hurst moved to the Sydney Roosters prior to the 1998 NRL season, one year before the Gold Coast Chargers incarnation folded, where he played 21 games before retiring in 2000.

== Post-NRL career ==
After his retirement, Hurst worked as the sponsorship manager for the Roosters, before being hired as an assistant coach at the South Sydney Rabbitohs in 2002. In December 2004, Hurst became the CEO of the Ipswich Jets. Hurst's appointment was the subject of some controversy, as former Redcliffe Dolphins lower grade coach Rob Campbell claimed he had been offered the job by Ipswich previously. Hurst retired from his position as CEO on 29 January 2007 because he wanted to travel. As CEO, Hurst was noted for his good relationship with the Ipswich Junior Rugby League.
