= Scott Zahra =

Australian rugby league footballer

Personal information
- Full name: Scott Zahra
- Born: 7 June 1974 (age 50); Southport, Queensland, Australia

Playing information
- Position: Five-eighth
Club
Years	Team	Pld	T	G	FG	P
1997–98	Gold Coast	6	0	0	0	0
- Source: As of 4 February 2019

Scott Zahra (born 7 June 1974) is a former Australian former professional rugby league footballer who played in the 1990s for the Gold Coast Chargers in the Australian National Rugby League competition.

== Background ==
Zahra was born in Southport, Queensland.

== Playing career ==
Zahra made his first grade debut for the Gold Coast in Round 1 1997 against Western Suburbs which ended in a 24–16 victory. Zahra's final game in first grade was in Round 17 1998 against North Queensland.
