= Grant Adamson =

Australian rugby league footballer

Playing information
- Position: Five-eighth
Club
Years	Team	Pld	T	G	FG	P
1995	Gold Coast Seagulls	1	0	0	0	0

Grant Adamson is an Australian former professional rugby league footballer who played for the Gold Coast Seagulls in the ARL competition.

== Playing career ==
Adamson played one first grade game for the Gold Coast against Illawarra in round 5 1995 at WIN Stadium which ended in a 34–16 loss.

He also played for the Burleigh Bears in the 1998 Queensland Cup.
