= Iain Wood =

NZ rugby league & union player

Personal information
- Born: New Zealand

Playing information

Rugby union
- Position: centre
Club
Years	Team	Pld	T	G	FG	P
	North Harbour

Rugby league
- Position: Fullback, Centre
Club
Years	Team	Pld	T	G	FG	P
1991–92	Gold Coast Seagulls	5	0	1	0	2

Iain Wood is a New Zealand rugby footballer who played rugby union for North Harbour and rugby league for the Gold Coast Seagulls.

== Playing career ==
Wood was an experienced centre who played for North Harbour until mid-way through the 1991 season. He then joined the Gold Coast Seagulls and played five games for them over two seasons.
