= ARL Premiership =

Rugby league competition

Australian Rugby League Premiership
- Sport: Rugby league
- Instituted: 1995
- Inaugural season: 1995
- Ceased: 1997
- Replaced by: National Rugby League
- Number of teams: 20 (1995–1996); 12 (1997)
- Country: Australia; New Zealand (Australian Rugby League)
- Broadcast partner: Nine Network; C7 Sport
- Related competition: New South Wales Rugby League premiership

The ARL Premiership was Australia's first grade rugby league competition between 1995 and 1997. It replaced the previous competition, the New South Wales Rugby League premiership, after the competition expanded to 20 teams with the admittance of four additional clubs to the competition; the North Queensland Cowboys (Townsville, Queensland), South Queensland Crushers (Brisbane, Queensland), Western Reds (Perth, Western Australia), and Auckland Warriors (Auckland, New Zealand).

== History ==
During the Super League war of the mid-1990s the Australian Rugby League (ARL) took over control of Australia's first grade competition from the New South Wales Rugby League (NSWRL) who had run the Premiership since its inception in 1908. As the premiership expanded to Queensland, Australian Capital Territory, Western Australia, and New Zealand, the NSWRL relinquished its control to the ARL.

Although they only won one ARL Premiership in 1996, the Manly-Warringah Sea Eagles dominated the competition in its three years under the ARL name, winning each minor premiership (1995–1997), and appearing in all three Grand Finals.

The Super League War reached its peak in 1997 with News Corporation following through on plans to run its rival Super League in direct competition with the Premiership. As a result, the ARL Premiership lost eight clubs to the newly formed league: Auckland Warriors, Brisbane Broncos, Canberra Raiders, Canterbury Bulldogs, Cronulla Sharks, North Queensland Cowboys, Penrith Panthers, and Perth Reds.

At the end of 1997, after an agreement was reached between the ARL and Super League owners News Corporation, the two competitions were absorbed into the newly created National Rugby League, resulting in the immediate shut down of financially troubled clubs the Hunter Mariners (Super League), Perth Reds (Super League), and South Queensland Crushers (ARL).

== Teams ==
Club	City	Home venue(s)	Est.	Joined	Exited
Auckland Warriors	(New Zealand) Auckland	Ericsson Stadium	1995	1995	1996^{4}
Brisbane Broncos	(Queensland) Brisbane	ANZ Stadium	1988	1995	1996^{4}
Canberra Raiders	(Australian Capital Territory) Canberra	Bruce Stadium	1981	1995	1996^{4}
Cronulla-Sutherland Sharks	(New South Wales) Sydney (Sutherland Shire)	Endeavour Park	1967	1995	1996^{4}
Gold Coast Chargers^{1}	(New South Wales) Tweed Heads (Queensland) Gold Coast	Seagulls Stadium (1995) Carrara Stadium (1996–1997)	1987	1995	1997
Illawarra Steelers	(New South Wales) Wollongong	Wollongong Stadium	1980	1995	1997
Manly Warringah Sea Eagles	(New South Wales) Sydney (Northern Beaches)	Brookvale Oval	1947	1995	1997
Newcastle Knights	(New South Wales) Newcastle	Marathon Stadium	1988	1995	1997
North Queensland Cowboys	(Queensland) Townsville	Stockland Stadium	1995	1995	1996^{4}
North Sydney Bears	(New South Wales) Sydney	North Sydney Oval	1908	1995	1997
Parramatta Eels	(New South Wales) Sydney (Parramatta)	Parramatta Stadium	1947	1995	1997
Penrith Panthers	(New South Wales) Sydney (Penrith)	Penrith Stadium	1967	1995	1996^{4}
South Queensland Crushers	(Queensland) Brisbane	Suncorp Stadium	1995	1995	1997
South Sydney Rabbitohs	(New South Wales) Sydney	Sydney Football Stadium	1908	1995	1997
St. George Dragons	(New South Wales) Sydney (St. George)	Kogarah Oval	1998	1995	1997
Sydney Bulldogs^{2}	(New South Wales) Sydney (Canterbury-Bankstown)	Parramatta Stadium	1934	1995	1996^{4}
Sydney City Roosters	(New South Wales) Sydney	Sydney Football Stadium	1908	1995	1997
Sydney Tigers^{3}	(New South Wales) Sydney (Balmain)	Parramatta Stadium	1908	1995	1997
Western Reds	(Western Australia) Perth	WACA Ground	1992	1995	1996^{4}
Western Suburbs Magpies	(New South Wales) Sydney	Campbelltown Stadium	1908	1995	1997

^{1} Played as the Gold Coast Seagulls in 1995 before being rebranded ahead of the 1996 season.

^{2} Rebranded from Canterbury-Bankstown Bulldogs in 1995 as a result of the Super League war.

^{3} Rebranded from Balmain Tigers in 1995 during the Super League war but reverted back for the 1997 season.

^{4} Exited to join the rival Super League for the 1997 season.

== Premiers ==
Season	Grand Finals			Minor Premiers
Season	Premiers	Score	Runners-up	Minor Premiers
1995	Canterbury-Bankstown	17–4	Manly-Warringah	Manly-Warringah
1996	Manly-Warringah	20–8	St. George	Manly-Warringah
1997	Newcastle	22–16	Manly-Warringah	Manly-Warringah
