= Frank Napoli =

Italy international rugby league footballer

Personal information
- Full name: Frank Napoli
- Born: Australia

Playing information
- Position: Wing
Club
Years	Team	Pld	T	G	FG	P
1994–96	Eastern Suburbs	8	2	0	0	8
1997	Gold Coast Chargers	1	0	0	0	0
2000	London Broncos	22	2	0	0	8
	Total	31	4	0	0	16
Representative
Years	Team	Pld	T	G	FG	P
1999	Italy	1	0	0	0	0
- Source: As of 26 February 2021

Frank Napoli is a former Italy international rugby league footballer who played as a winger for the Eastern Suburbs in the NSWRL Premiership and the ARL Premiership as well as the Gold Coast Chargers. He also played for the London Broncos in the European Super League.
