= Michael Salafia =

Australian rugby league footballer

Personal information
- Full name: Michael Salafia

Playing information
Club
Years	Team	Pld	T	G	FG	P
1995	Eastern Suburbs	3	0	0	0	0
1996	Gold Coast	1	0	0	0	0
	Total	4	0	0	0	0
Representative
Years	Team	Pld	T	G	FG	P
1999	Italy	1	0	1	0	2

Michael Salafia is an Australian former professional rugby league footballer who played in the 1990s for Eastern Suburbs and Gold Coast Chargers of the Australian Rugby League. He played at five-eighth.

== Playing career ==
Salafia made his debut from the bench for Eastern Suburbs in round 8 of the 1995 ARL season. The next week, he played his first game in the starting line-up, replacing regular five-eighth Andrew Walker. The Roosters won the game, the only victory of Salafia's short career.

In 1996, Salafia joined the Gold Coast Chargers. He was in the starting side for the club's first game under the new moniker, but it was to be the last game he played.

After his retirement from professional football, Salafia went on to represent Italy, and Group 7.
