= Chris Orr (rugby league) =

Scotland international rugby league footballer

Christopher Orr
Personal information
- Full name: Christopher Orr
- Born: 18 November 1973 (age 51)

Playing information
- Position: Halfback, Five-eighth
Club
Years	Team	Pld	T	G	FG	P
1995–97	Gold Coast Chargers	27	2	0	0	8
1998	Huddersfield Giants	23	2	0	0	8
	Total	50	4	0	0	16
Representative
Years	Team	Pld	T	G	FG	P
1998	Scotland	2	0	0	0	0

Christopher Orr (born 18 November 1973) is a former professional rugby league footballer who played as a stand-off or scrum-half in the 1990s. He played at representative level for Scotland, and at club level for the Gold Coast Chargers and the Huddersfield Giants.

== International honours ==
Chris Orr won caps for Scotland while at the Huddersfield Giants 1998 2-caps.
