= Paul Sheahan (rugby league) =

Australian rugby league footballer

Playing information
- Position: Wing, Fullback
Club
Years	Team	Pld	T	G	FG	P
1986–87	Western Suburbs	31	5	0	0	2
1988	Gold Coast-Tweed Giants	1	0	0	0	0
	Total	32	5	0	0	2

Paul Sheahan is an Australian former professional rugby league footballer who played in the 1980s. He played for the Gold Coast and Western Suburbs in the New South Wales Rugby League (NSWRL) competition.

== Playing career ==
Sheahan made his first grade debut for Western Suburbs against Penrith in round 1 1986 at Lidcombe Oval. Sheahan played 21 games for Wests in his first season at the club as they finished second last on the table. The following year, Sheahan played 10 games as Western Suburbs finished last on the table.

In 1988, Sheahan joined the newly admitted Gold Coast-Tweed Giants club as they were then known. Sheahan played on the wing in the club's first ever game against Canterbury-Bankstown in round 1 1988 at Seagulls Stadium. Canterbury would go on to win the game 21–10. This would be Sheahan's last game as a player in the top grade.

== Post playing ==
After retiring from rugby league, Sheahan became a competitive runner.
