= Jeff Orford =

Australian rugby league footballer

Personal information
- Born: 11 January 1971 (age 55) Sydney, New South Wales, Australia

Playing information
- Height: 181 cm (5 ft 11 in)
- Weight: 90 kg (14 st 2 lb)
- Position: Wing, Centre
Club
Years	Team	Pld	T	G	FG	P
1991–94	Eastern Suburbs	70	22	0	0	88
1995	St. George Dragons	8	1	0	0	4
1996	Gold Coast Chargers	13	2	0	0	8
1997	South Sydney	10	5	0	0	20
	Total	101	30	0	0	120
Representative
Years	Team	Pld	T	G	FG	P
1992–93	NSW City	2	0	0	0	0

Jeff Orford (born 11 January 1971) is an Australian former professional rugby league footballer who played in the 1990s. He played for Eastern Suburbs, St. George, Gold Coast Chargers and South Sydney in the New South Wales Rugby League premiership. Orford primarily played on the wing.

== Playing career ==
Orford was an Australian Schoolboys representative in 1989. In 1990, he was graded by the Eastern Suburbs Roosters. He made his first grade debut in his sides' 16−14 victory over the North Sydney Bears at the Sydney Football Stadium in round 9 of the 1991 season.

In 1992, Orford was selected to play on the wing in the City Origin side in the annual City vs Country Origin game, and was considered unlucky to miss out on a spot in the New South Wales side in the 1992 State of Origin series. Graham Mackay and Rod Wishart were instead chosen as the wingers. Orford was once again picked in the City Origin side in the 1993 City vs Country Origin game. This would be Orford's last appearance in a senior representative game, as he was once again overlooked for selection the 1993 New South Wales team. After a poor 1994 season in which the Roosters only won 6 of their 22 games, Orford left the Roosters at season's end.

In 1995, Orford joined the St. George Dragons in a direct swap with Andrew Walker who subsequently left the Dragons to join the Roosters. After playing only 8 games with the Dragons, Orford was once again on the move at the end of the 1995 season. In 1996, Orford joined the Gold Coast Chargers. He played 13 games for the Chargers. He decided to return to Sydney at the conclusion of the 1996 season. Orford sought to return to the Roosters, but after being turned down by his old club, Orford instead signed with arch rivals the South Sydney Rabbitohs for the 1997 season.

In 1997, Orford played his final season of rugby league at the South Sydney Rabbitohs. Whilst not fully recapturing his stellar form from his days at the Roosters, he made 10 appearances for South Sydney and scored 5 tries including a double in his sides' 20−16 win over the Western Suburbs Magpies in round 13 of the 1997 season.

Orford trained with Souths at the start of the 1998 season, but after suffering a serious knee injury in a trial match, he subsequently retired from the game. He finished his career after playing 101 games and scoring 30 tries.
