= Keith Blackett =

Australian rugby league footballer

Personal information
- Full name: Keith Blackett
- Born: 5 July 1972 (age 54) Bathurst, New South Wales, Australia

Playing information
- Position: Five-eighth
Club
Years	Team	Pld	T	G	FG	P
1994–96	Parramatta Eels	25	3	25	0	62
1997	Gold Coast	7	1	0	0	4
	Total	32	4	25	0	66

Keith Blackett (born 5 July 1972) is an Australian former professional rugby league footballer who played as a five-eighth for the Parramatta Eels and the Gold Coast Chargers in the 1990s.

== Playing career ==
Blackett made his first grade debut for Parramatta in Round 1 of the 1994 season against the Brisbane Broncos. Blackett spent three seasons at Parramatta before moving to The Gold Coast.

Blackett made seven appearances for the club before being released. Speaking to the media in 2011, Parramatta legend Steve Ella who was working as a talent scout for the club recommended a young Darren Lockyer to the recruitment bosses at Parramatta but Ella was told that Blackett and Michael Buettner were the preferred options for the 1994 season.
