= Mark Ross (rugby league) =

Australian rugby league player

Personal information
- Full name: Mark Ross
- Born: 25 August 1961 (age 63)

Playing information
- Position: Centre, Wing
Club
Years	Team	Pld	T	G	FG	P
1980	Penrith Panthers	12	2	0	1	7
1981–87	South Sydney	63	26	59	0	206
1988–91	Gold Coast Giants	49	10	0	0	40
	Total	124	38	59	1	253

Mark Ross, also known by the nickname of "Angry", is an Australian former professional rugby league footballer who played in the 1980s and 1990s. He played with the South Sydney Rabbitohs, Penrith Panthers and the Gold Coast Giants as a winger and as a centre.

== Playing career ==
Ross was a Penrith junior and made his debut for the club in Round 4 1980 against St George. Ross only spent one season with Penrith before joining South Sydney in 1981. In his first season at Souths, Ross finished as top point scorer and top try scorer. Over the next couple of seasons, Ross missed out on many games due to injury and missed the entire 1984 season because of a broken leg suffered in a pre season trial.

In 1986, Ross only made 4 appearances at Souths as the club finished second on the table and qualified for the finals. In 1988, Ross joined the newly formed Gold Coast Giants later named as Seagulls, Gladiators and Chargers. Ross was a foundation player for the club and featured in their first ever match, a 21–10 loss to Canterbury. Ross played a further 3 seasons for Gold Coast and retired at the end of 1991. Ross is the father of Newcastle Knights player Nathan Ross.
