= Eddie Fallins =

Australian rugby league footballer

Personal information
- Full name: Edward Fallins
- Born: 14 March 1969; Redfern, New South Wales, Australia
- Died: 14 June 2008 (aged 39); Tweed Heads, New South Wales

Playing information
- Height: 176 cm (5 ft 9 in)
- Weight: 76 kg (168 lb; 12 st 0 lb)
- Position: Hooker, Second-row
Club
Years	Team	Pld	T	G	FG	P
1990–95	Gold Coast Seagulls	32	6	0	0	24

Eddie Fallins (14 March 1969 − 14 June 2008) was an Australian professional rugby league footballer who played in the 1990s. He played his entire club career with the Gold Coast Seagulls. He played mostly at hooker but also played the occasional game at second-row.

== Playing career ==
Fallins was a Runaway Bay Seagulls junior. He was a member of their successful junior teams. Fallins also played as a Junior Queensland representative in 1985 in the under-16 competition. He was signed by the Gold Coast club in 1989. At the end of the 1989 season, the Gold Coast as they were then known by the name "Gold Coast/Tweed Heads Giants" became bankrupt and were quickly remodeled as the Gold Coast Seagulls for the 1990 season. Fallins made his first grade debut from the bench in his side's 14−6 loss to the Canberra Raiders in round 6 of the 1990 season.

After playing only seven first grade games, Fallins was controversially sacked from the Gold Coast club for disciplinary reasons midway through the 1991 season. Gold Coast coach John Harvey recalled Fallins to the club midway through the 1994 season, he cemented his position in the side when regular hooker Ray Herring was suspended in May, and held it for the rest of the season. He was named as club's player of the year in 1994, despite playing in only 13 of his side's 22 games. Fallins' stint with the Gold Coast club ended at the conclusion of the 1995 season. In total, Fallins played 32 games and scored six tries.

Fallins later went on to play locally for the Murwillumbah Mustangs and Tugun Seahawks.

Fallins died in 2008 at the age of 39.
