= Billy Johnstone =

Australian rugby league footballer & boxer

Personal information
- Full name: William Johnstone
- Born: 15 June 1959 (age 67) Cunnamulla, Queensland, Australia

Playing information
- Height: 182 cm (6 ft 0 in)
- Weight: 80 kg (12 st 8 lb)
- Position: Hooker
Club
Years	Team	Pld	T	G	FG	P
1980–82	Southern Suburbs	53	6	0	0	18
1983–86	Canterbury-Bankstown	83	7	0	0	28
1987	St. George Dragons	22	0	0	0	0
1988–90	Gold Coast Giants	61	7	0	0	28
	Total	219	20	0	0	74

William Johnstone (born 15 June 1959) is an Australian former rugby league footballer who played for Canterbury-Bankstown, St. George and the Gold Coast Giants. Johnstone also was a boxer, with 21 wins and 6 losses in 27 bouts.

== Playing career ==
Johnston won the Brisbane Rugby League premiership with Souths in 1981. Johnstone played in the 1982 Brisbane Rugby League grand final for Souths against Wynnum-Manly.

Johnstone made his first grade debut in the NSWRL competition for Canterbury against the Illawarra Steelers in round 1 1983 at Belmore Sports Ground. Johnstone played in Canterbury's preliminary final loss against Parramatta that year. Johnstone was voted as the Dally M Hooker of the year in 1983.

Johnstone played at hooker in Canterbury's 1985 Grand Final victory over St. George. The following season, Johnstone played in the club's preliminary final victory over Balmain but missed the 1986 grand final against Parramatta which Canterbury lost 4–2 at the Sydney Cricket Ground. In 1987, Johnstone joined St George but only played the one season with them and then signed for the newly admitted Gold Coast team.

Johnstone was appointed the inaugural captain of the Gold Coast-Tweed Giants. Johnstone spent 3 years at the Gold Coast which was met with limited success.

== Post playing ==
After retirement, Johnstone later became the club's recruitment manager. He became a Strength and Conditioning Coach in the NRL.

He worked with the North Queensland Cowboys from 2002 to 2006 before moving to the newly established Gold Coast Titans. The North Queensland club however have again offered Billy a deal he couldn't turn down.

In July 2008, he was granted a release from the Gold Coast Titans and has signed a three-year deal with the North Queensland Cowboys, beginning in 2009. Billy Jonstone also is currently operating as a personal trainer from a local gym in Townsville, Queensland named 'The Zoo Health & Fitness, where he trains intermediate to advanced members and uses his Strength & Conditioning knowledge to good value. https://web.archive.org/web/20111127183212/http://www.thezoohf.com.au/zoo/staffprofiles.html

== Professional Boxing Titles ==
Billy Johnstone
Personal information
- Nationality: Australian
- Born: 15 June 1959 (age 67) Cunnamulla, Queensland, Australia
- Height: 182 cm (6 ft 0 in)
- Weight: Super welterweight

Boxing career
- Stance: Southpaw

Boxing record
- Total fights: 27
- Wins: 21
- Win by KO: 12
- Losses: 6
- Draws: 0

- Australia - Queensland State middleweight title (156½Ibs)
- Australia - Queensland State super welterweight title (154Ibs)
