= Craig Coleman =

Australian RL coach and former rugby league footballer

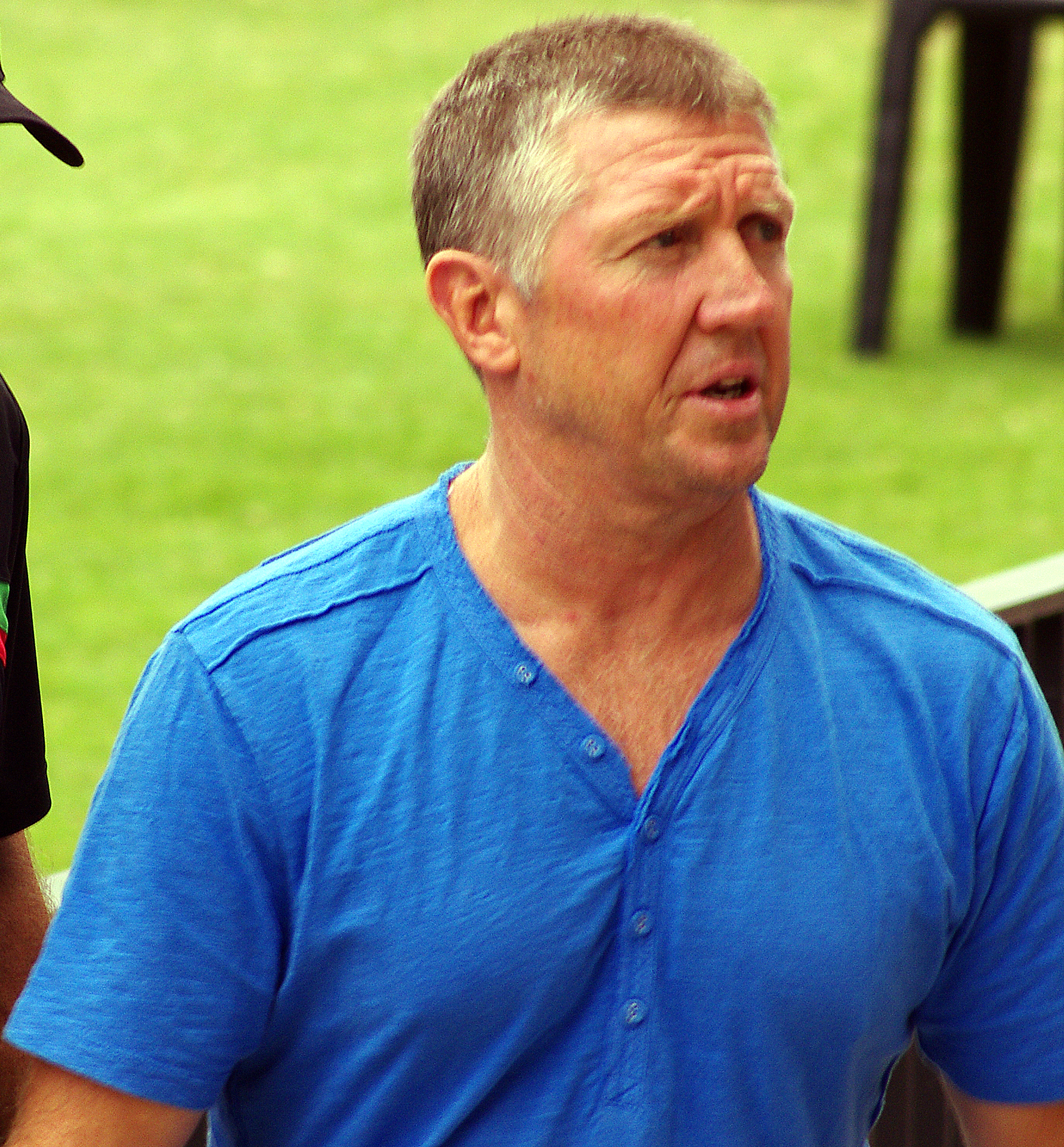

Personal information
- Born: 31 January 1963 (age 63) Surry Hills, New South Wales, Australia

Playing information
- Position: Halfback
Club
Years	Team	Pld	T	G	FG	P
1982–92	South Sydney	208	25	0	8	108
1986–87	Widnes	3	1	0	1	5
1988–89	Hull FC	24	3	0	1	14
1989–90	Leeds	17	3	0	2	14
1992–93	Salford	28	7	0	0	28
1994–95	Gold Coast Seagulls	44	4	0	0	16
1996	Western Suburbs	16	1	0	0	4
	Total	340	44	0	12	189

Coaching information
Club
Years	Team	Gms	W	D	L	W%
1998–99	South Sydney	48	15	0	33	31
2002	South Sydney	24	5	0	19	21
	Total	72	20	0	52	28

Craig Coleman (born 31 January 1963) is an Australian former professional rugby league footballer, and coach. He primarily played at halfback, and remains fourth on the list of most first-grade games played for Souths, 208.

== Playing career ==
Coleman, affectionally known in rugby league circles as "Tugger", was graded to South Sydney as a seventeen-year-old in 1980. In 1981 he played in the under-23 side coached by Brian Smith which lost only two games in the season and won the Grand Final at the Sydney Cricket Ground.

He made his first-grade début for South Sydney in round 14 of the 1982 season, playing off the bench against the Canterbury-Bankstown Bulldogs at Redfern Oval. His first match at halfback was in round 22 of the 1982 season against Peter Sterling, and the Parramatta Eels at Redfern Oval.

During his eleven seasons with Souths, Coleman spent three off-seasons playing in England – Widnes, Hull FC and Leeds. After he was released by Souths at the end of the 1992 season, he played a fourth off-season in England, for Salford.

Due to his late return to Australia (after 1 February signing deadline), Coleman was unable to sign with the Gold Coast for the 1993 season. He threatened to take the Australian Rugby League to court when he was denied the clearance but spent the year playing park football for the Coogee Wombats in Souths' A-grade competition. He was back in first grade in 1994 with the Gold Coast Seagulls, and finished his first-grade career playing one season for the Western Suburbs Magpies in 1996 under coach, Tommy Raudonikis.

== Coaching career ==
Coleman returned to the Rabbitohs as a reserve-grade coach and took over from Steve Martin as first-grade coach in round 19 of the 1998 season.

In 2000, the Rabbitohs were excluded from the National Rugby League competition. Coleman, while working as a baggage handler for Ansett, joined the fight to have the club included in the competition. On the club's return in the 2002 season, Coleman was once again head coach but after a poor season the South Sydney board considered his position in late September. A split decision opted to retain Coleman as coach but revised the coaching staff, appointing Phil Blake (former Souths utility player) as the club's new coaching coordinator with Paul Langmack appointed as defensive coach. Five months later and only eleven days before the official start of the 2003 season, Coleman was sacked by the club after a series of losses in the pre-season trials. Under his coaching, the Rabbitohs won 17 of 54 games (31%) over three playing seasons. 1999 was the most successful of Coleman's coaching seasons in NRL, with the Rabbitohs narrowly missing the semi-finals.

== Controversies ==
Coleman was charged with assaulting a man at Bondi Junction on 31 August 1987. In March 1988 Coleman was sentenced to weekend detention for this crime. He appealed the decision and this appeal was upheld in June 1989.

Coleman was charged with assaulting a man during a game of touch football on 27 January 1986. This charge was dismissed in February 1988.
