= Bennett King =

Australian rugby league footballer and cricket coach

Bennett Alfred King
Personal information
- Born: 19 December 1964 (age 61) Mossman, Queensland, Australia

Playing information
- Position: Wing
Club
| Years | Team | Pld | T | G | FG | P |
|---|---|---|---|---|---|---|
| 1988 | Gold-Coast-Tweed Giants | 10 | 1 | 0 | 0 | 8 |
Representative
| Years | Team | Pld | T | G | FG | P |
| 1987 | Queensland | 2 | 1 | 0 | 0 | 4 |
- Cricket career

Cricket information

Head coaching information
- Years: Team
- 1999: Queensland Bulls
- 2005-07: West Indies

Bennett Alfred King (born 19 December 1964 in Mossman, Queensland, Australia) is an Australian cricket coach and former professional rugby league footballer. He played first-grade for the Gold Coast-Tweed Giants in the 1988 NSWRL season.

King was the former coach of the West Indies national cricket team. Before taking over the West Indies coaching role from Gus Logie, Bennett King was the Queensland Bulls' first team coach. In the 1999–2000 Australian domestic season, Bennett King was appointed as head coach after the departure of John Buchanan to the Australian national cricket team. In his first season, King led the Bulls to victory in the first-class cricket competition, the Pura Cup. He then led them to victory in that same competition for the following two years, until he was appointed as the head coach at the Australian Cricket Academy. It was from there that he went on to be appointed as the head coach of the West Indies cricket team. With King in charge the Windies won the 2006 home ODI series against India, later reaching the finals of both the 2006 DLF Cup along with the 2006 Champions Trophy. After a moderate showing from at the 2007 Cricket World Cup King stepped down as the Caribbean side's head coach.

Currently King assumes the role of Queensland Cricket's General Manager of Performance, Pathways, Coaching and Community Cricket.
