= Keith Neller =

Australian rugby league footballer

Personal information
- Full name: Keith Neller
- Born: 2 January 1960 (age 65)

Playing information
- Height: 5 ft 11 in (180 cm)
- Position: Prop
Club
Years	Team	Pld	T	G	FG	P
1984–87	Fortitude Valley
1984–88	Halifax	102	15	0	0	60
1988–92	Gold Coast	47	3	0	0	12
	Total	149	18	0	0	72

Keith Neller (born 2 January 1960) is an Australian former professional rugby league footballer who played in the 1980s and 1990s. He played at club level for Halifax, in two separate spells in 1984-85 and 1986–88, and Gold Coast Chargers, as a prop.

== Playing career ==
=== Challenge Cup Final appearances ===
Neller played at prop in Halifax's 19–18 victory over St. Helens in the 1987 Challenge Cup Final during the 1986–87 season at Wembley Stadium, London on Saturday 2 May 1987, and played at prop in the 32–12 defeat by Wigan in the 1988 Challenge Cup final during the 1987–88 season at Wembley Stadium, London on Saturday 30 April 1988.
