= Brett Horsnell =

Australian rugby league footballer

Personal information
- Full name: Brett Horsnell
- Born: 11 April 1970 (age 56)

Playing information
- Position: Centre, Second-row, Lock
Club
Years	Team	Pld	T	G	FG	P
1989–94	Gold Coast Seagulls	82	4	0	0	16
1995–96	South Queensland Crushers	38	3	0	0	12
1997–98	Parramatta Eels	34	1	0	0	4
	Total	154	8	0	0	32
- Source: As of 1 February 2019

Brett Horsnell (born 11 April 1970) is an Australian former professional rugby league footballer.

== Early years ==
Horsnell attended Keebra Park State High School and captained the 1988 Australia Schoolboy team on a tour of New Zealand. He was a Junior Queensland representative in 1985 as an under-16 and in 1988 at under-18.

Horsnell played for the Runaway Bay Seagulls and was part of their successful junior teams.

== Playing career ==
Horsnell made his first grade debut for the Gold Coast Giants in 1989 as a five-eighth/centre. However, Horsnell slowly moved into the forwards and by 1992 he played the whole season as a lock for the now Gold Coast Seagulls. After six seasons and 82 matches for the Gold Coast club where the side finished last 3 years in a row in 1992, 1993 and 1994, Horsnell left in 1995, joining the new South Queensland Crushers franchise. He was part of their inaugural match on 11 March 1995 and was a shadow player for Queensland captain Trevor Gillmeister when Gillmeister was hospitalised in the lead-up to Game III of that year's State of Origin series. Horsnell spent two seasons with the club and was a part of the side which came last in 1996, finishing with the wooden spoon.

In 1997, Horsnell joined the Parramatta Eels and played in the club's first finals campaign since 1986 when they finished third on the table that year. Horsnell played in both of Parramatta's finals games, against Newcastle and North Sydney. Horsnell was used in every position in the pack, even starting at hooker and at prop while at the club. Horsnell left Parramatta at the end of the 1998 season, with his final game in first grade being a 15-15 draw against St George in Round 24 at Kogarah Oval.

== Later years ==
Horsnell was misdiagnosed with a brain tumor in 2004. On 23 October 2004, a charity match was held for Horsnell that featured the South Queensland Crushers and the Gold Coast Seagulls, both clubs by then defunct, being resurrected for the day.

== Legal Action ==
In 2017, Horsnell took legal action against Parramatta District Rugby League Club for a head injury as a result of head knocks received during his career. .

The Australian quotes details from an affidavit in the matter outlining that Horsnell is taking action as a result of a medical assessment by a Gold Coast neurologist confirming that he is "almost certainly suffering from chronic traumatic encephalopathy". (subscription required)

The same article also contains a statement from Mr Horsnell "I gave a large part of my life to the game I love,” he said. “I did not want to take action or make anything public about myself, my injuries, or the game. Unfortunately I had no choice but to take legal action as my only remaining option. I would like to sincerely thank the medical specialists who have treated me, and given me the news I didn’t want to hear, but needed to hear." (subscription required)

An Article in the Australian(subscription required) on 18 July 2017 confirms that Horsnell has also commenced proceedings in Queensland against the National Rugby League and the Australian Rugby League Commission for injuries received at the South Queensland Crushers and the Gold Coast Seagulls. The article contains a statement from his lawyers, Certus Legal Group, saying that Horsnell suffered more than 50 serious head knocks during his 156-game career.
