= Peter Benson (rugby league) =

Australian rugby league footballer

Personal information
- Full name: Peter Benson
- Born: 24 January 1967 (age 59)

Playing information
- Position: Fullback, Wing, Centre
Club
Years	Team	Pld	T	G	FG	P
1987	North Sydney Bears	5	0	0	0	0
1988	Brisbane Broncos	4	0	0	0	0
1989–90	Gold Coast	38	8	36	0	104
1992	Wakefield Trinity	30	9	37	0	110
1994	Canberra Raiders	2	0	0	0	0
1994	Gold Coast	1	0	0	0	0
	Total	80	17	73	0	214

Peter Benson (born 24 January 1967) is a former professional rugby league footballer who played in the 1980s and 1990s. He played at club level for the North Sydney Bears, Brisbane Broncos, Gold Coast (Twice), Wakefield Trinity and the Canberra Raiders. He played as a fullback, wing or centre.

== Playing career ==
=== County Cup Final appearances ===
Peter Benson played left-centre and scored three goals in Wakefield Trinity's 29-16 victory over Sheffield Eagles in the 1992–93 Yorkshire Cup Final during the 1992–93 season at Elland Road, Leeds on Sunday 18 October 1992.

== Sources ==
- Alan Whiticker & Glen Hudson (2007). The Encyclopedia of Rugby League Players. Wetherill Park, New South Wales: Gary Allen Pty Ltd. ISBN 978-1-877082-93-1.
