= Scott Conley (rugby league) =

Australian rugby league footballer

Personal information
- Full name: Scott Conley
- Born: 8 June 1973 (age 53) Newcastle, New South Wales, Australia
- Height: 178 cm (5 ft 10 in)
- Weight: 95 kg (14 st 13 lb)

Playing information
- Position: Second-row, Lock
Club
| Years | Team | Pld | T | G | FG | P |
|---|---|---|---|---|---|---|
| 1995–97 | Newcastle Knights | 22 | 0 | 0 | 0 | 20 |
| 1998 | Gold Coast Chargers | 17 | 0 | 0 | 0 | 0 |
| 1999 | Newcastle Knights | 17 | 5 | 0 | 0 | 20 |
| | Total | 56 | 5 | 0 | 0 | 40 |
- Source: As of 4 February 2019

Scott Conley (born 8 June 1973) is an Australian former professional rugby league footballer who played as a lock and second-row forward for the Newcastle Knights and the Gold Coast Chargers in the NRL in the 1990s.

== Background ==
Conley was born in Newcastle, New South Wales.

== Playing career ==
Conley made his first grade debut for Newcastle in Round 19 1995 against Parramatta. Conley missed out on the entire 1996 season but returned to the first grade side in 1997.

Conley played 21 games including the 1997 grand final which Newcastle won in the final seconds of the game when Darren Albert scored under the posts after a pass from Andrew Johns.

In 1998, Conley joined the Gold Coast and played in the club's final ever season before returning to Newcastle in 1999. Conley's final game in first grade was a 38–6 loss against Brisbane in Round 22 1999.
