= Danny Peacock =

Australian rugby league footballer (1968–2025)

Personal information
- Born: 4 March 1968
- Died: 24 July 2025 (aged 57) Toowoomba, Queensland, Australia

Playing information
- Position: Fullback, Centre, Wing
Club
Years	Team	Pld	T	G	FG	P
1988–90	Western Suburbs	49	9	0	0	36
1991–95	Gold Coast	67	28	0	0	112
1996	South Queensland	11	1	0	0	4
1997–99	Bradford Bulls	52	22	0	0	88
	Total	179	60	0	0	240

Danny Peacock (4 March 1968 – 24 July 2025) was an Australian professional rugby league footballer. He played for the Western Suburbs Magpies, South Queensland Crushers, Gold Coast Seagulls and Bradford Bulls as a fullback, centre, or wing.

== Playing career ==
=== Western Suburbs ===
In the trials of the 1988 pre-season, it was said, "Another outstanding performer was winger Danny Peacock who continues to impress with some flashy footwork and heavy tackles." He made his debut for the Wests Magpies in the first round of the season, playing in the centres, but was to play on the wing for most of the rest of the year. He scored his first points 3 weeks later, crossing for two tries in the round 4 match against Balmain.

By 1989, Peacock was a regular in first grade, and was considered a, "great developing talent," noted for his, "sheer speed."

Western Suburbs struggled in the late eighties, and Peacock played in just 10 winning games in the three years with club, but gained attention with his attacking play from fullback.

=== Gold Coast and South Queensland ===
Peacock joined the Gold Coast Seagulls, as they were then known, in 1991, the same year Wally Lewis joined the club. He quickly cemented the position as starting fullback. He spent 5 years with the club, and holds the record for the most tries scored for the club, with 28.

In 1995, Peacock was moved to the centres. He scored 14 tries that season, which is another club record. He is also tenth on the list of most appearances for the club.

Peacock joined the South Queensland Crushers for the 1996 season, but only managed 11 appearances.

Peacock finished his first grade career with the unwanted record of 5 wooden spoons which he earned at the 3 different clubs he played for.

=== Bradford ===
Moving to England in 1997, Peacock spent three seasons with the Bradford Bulls. Joining Graeme Bradley in the centres, he was a popular player at the club. Coach Matt Elliott described him as, "an emotional leader for the team." Peacock was described as a "key figure" in the Bulls winning their 1997 title. He scored a try in the 1997 Challenge Cup Final as well as having one disallowed later in the first half.

Peacock retired in 1999 after a recurrence of a knee injury and was given a fitting farewell by the Bulls.

== Death ==
Peacock died on 24 July 2025, at the age of 57.

== Sources ==
- Alan Whiticker & Glen Hudson (2007). The Encyclopedia of Rugby League Players. Wetherill Park, New South Wales: Gary Allen Pty Ltd. ISBN 978-1-877082-93-1.
