= Robert Tocco =

Australian rugby league footballer

Personal information
- Born: 18 July 1972 (age 52)

Playing information
- Position: Prop
Club
Years	Team	Pld	T	G	FG	P
1992–94	Gold Coast Seagulls	19	0	0	0	0
1995–98	Canterbury-Bankstown	28	3	0	0	12
1999	South Sydney	11	0	0	0	0
	Total	58	3	0	0	12

Robert Tocco (born 18 July 1972) is an Australian former professional rugby league footballer who played for the Gold Coast Seagulls, Canterbury and South Sydney.

== Playing career ==
Tocco, a prop, grew up on the Gold Coast and played three seasons of first grade with the Seagulls, debuting in 1992. Tocco was a part of the Gold Coast sides which finished with back to back wooden spoons in 1992 and 1993. Tocco's final season at the club saw the side finish second last on the table.

In 1995, Tocco joined Canterbury and made five appearances in the club's premiership winning season. Tocco was a regular fixture in the team in 1996, with a career high 17 first-grade games for the year, then in 1997 played in a premiership with the reserves.

Tocco finished his career at South Sydney, playing 11 games in the 1999 NRL season.
