= Paul Martin (rugby league) =

Australian rugby league footballer

Personal information
- Full name: Paul Martin
- Born: 14 June 1967 (age 58)

Playing information
- Position: Wing
Club
Years	Team	Pld	T	G	FG	P
1986–91	Canberra Raiders	85	28	0	0	112
1992–93	Gold Coast	37	8	0	0	32
	Total	122	36	0	0	144
Representative
Years	Team	Pld	T	G	FG	P
1991	Country NSW	1	0	0	0	0

Paul Martin (born 14 June 1967) is an Australian former rugby league footballer who played in the 1980s and 1990s for the Canberra Raiders and the Gold Coast.

== Playing career ==
While attending Stirling College ACT, Martin played for the Australian Schoolboys rugby league team in 1984 and 1985.

In the 1989 NSWRL season's grand final Martin played for the Canberra Raiders from the interchange bench in the win against the Balmain Tigers. In the post season he travelled with the Raiders to England for the 1989 World Club Challenge which was lost to Widnes.

Martin started on the wing for the Raiders grand finals matches against the Penrith Panthers in 1990 and 1991. Martin was the top tryscorer for the Raiders in 1991 with 14.

Martin played out his career with the Gold Coast.

Martin ranks as #10 of The Raiders' top 10 Indigenous players.

== Personal life ==
Paul is a descendant of Thomas George White and Eliza Hammond.
