= Geoff Bagnall =

Australian rugby league footballer

Personal information
- Born: 4 November 1965 (age 60)

Playing information
- Position: Scrum-half
Club
Years	Team	Pld	T	G	FG	P
1985–1987	Northern Suburbs	5	1	0	0	4
1988–91	Gold Coast Seagulls	55	3	0	0	12
1991–94	Wakefield Trinity	55	12	1	0	50
	Total	115	16	1	0	66

Geoff Bagnall (born 4 November 1965) is a former professional rugby league footballer who played in the 1980s and 1990s. He played at club level for Gold Coast-Tweed Giants and Wakefield Trinity (captain), as a scrum-half.

== Playing career ==
=== County Cup Final appearances ===
Bagnall played scrum-half, and scored a try in Wakefield Trinity's 29–16 victory over Sheffield Eagles in the 1992–93 Yorkshire Cup Final during the 1992–93 season at Elland Road, Leeds on Sunday 18 October 1992.
