= Robert Simpkins =

Australian rugby league player

Personal information
- Born: 23 May 1960 (age 65)

Playing information
- Position: Lock, centre,
Club
Years	Team	Pld	T	G	FG	P
1981–83	South Sydney	40	12	0	0	38
1984–87	Eastern Suburbs	48	7	0	0	28
1988–91	Gold Coast Chargers	72	1	0	0	4
	Total	160	20	0	0	70
- Relatives: Ryan Simpkins (son)

Robert Simpkins (born 23 May 1960) is an Australian former professional rugby league player. During his career, he played in a number of positions, primarily as a lock, hooker and centre. He played eleven seasons in the NSWRL, notching 160 appearances in the competition for South Sydney (1981–83), the Eastern Suburbs (1984–87) and the Gold Coast Chargers (1988–91).

Simpkins' son, Ryan (born 1988), played for the Penrith Panthers and Gold Coast Titans.
