= Michael Searle (rugby league) =

Australian rugby league footballer and administrator

Personal information
- Full name: Michael Thomas Searle
- Born: 16 July 1968 (age 58) Gold Coast, Queensland, Australia

Playing information
- Height: 184 cm (6 ft 0 in)
- Weight: 97 kg (15 st 4 lb; 214 lb)
- Position: Prop, Second-row, Hooker, Lock
Club
Years	Team	Pld	T	G	FG	P
1988–95	Gold Coast Seagulls	54	7	0	9	28

Michael Searle (born 16 July 1968) is an Australian businessman and rugby league football identity. He was the first Chief Executive for the Gold Coast Titans, whose inaugural season in the National Rugby League was 2007. Searle also manages an accountancy firm, an international talent management group and headed the push for an independent commission to take over the running of the NRL. This occurred in 2012.

== Playing career ==
Son of former player Tom Searle, Michael Searle played rugby league in the forwards for the Gold Coast club of the 1980s and 1990s.

== Administration career ==
A month after starting an accountancy firm, at age 29 Searle agreed to lead the Gold Coast's bid for an NRL licence on 15 March 1999. The Titans' first season was the 2007 Telstra Premiership. During the 2012 NRL season it was revealed that the Titans club was heavily in debt and the prospect of bankruptcy hung over the club. Gold Coast managed to recover but it would be Searle's last year in the Chief Executive role.
