= Wes Patten =

Australian rugby league footballer

Personal information
- Full name: Wesley Patten
- Born: 17 February 1974 (age 52) Taree, Australia

Playing information
- Position: Halfback
Club
Years	Team	Pld	T	G	FG	P
1993–96	Balmain	27	7	0	0	28
1997–98	Gold Coast	43	16	0	1	65
1999	South Sydney	11	3	0	0	12
2000	St. George Illawarra	10	2	0	0	8
	Total	91	28	0	1	113
- Source: As of 28 January 2019

Wes Patten (born 17 February 1974) is an Australian former professional rugby league footballer who played in the 1990s and 2000s. He played for the Balmain Tigers, Gold Coast Chargers, South Sydney Rabbitohs and the St. George Illawarra Dragons. Patten primarily played at half-back.

== Playing career ==
Patten made his first-grade debut for Balmain in Round 22 of the 1993 NSWRL season against Parramatta. In 1995, Balmain changed their name to the "Sydney Tigers" at the start of the Super League war and moved their home games to Parramatta Stadium. Patten became a regular starter for the team in 1996, before departing at the end of the season to join the Gold Coast Chargers.

In his first year at the Gold Coast, Patten played 24 matches as the club reached its first-ever finals series. Patten played in both finals games, a 25–14 victory over Illawarra and a 32–10 loss against the Sydney City Roosters.

The following year, Patten played in the Chargers' final ever game as a club, a 20–18 loss against Cronulla-Sutherland. In 1999, Patten joined South Sydney and played in the club's final season in the league before they were controversially excluded from the competition. In 2000, Patten joined St George-Illawarra and played one season with them before retiring at the end of the season at the age of 26.

== Other activities ==
Patten guest-starred in Australian soap operas A Country Practice as Lionel Ngurra (1989) and Home and Away as student Kevin Baker (1993). He also appeared in the 1994 Australian television show Heartland.

Patten worked as a reporter and sideline host for The Barefoot Rugby League Show on National Indigenous Television (NITV).

== Personal life ==
Patten is the cousin of Anthony Mundine.

== Oral history ==
Patten was interviewed in 2016 by Peter Reid for the Seven Years On - continuing life histories of Aboriginal leaders oral project. The recording can be found at the National Library of Australia.

== Sources ==
- Whiticker, Alan and Hudson, Glen; The Encyclopedia of Rugby League Players; published 2005 by BAS publishing, f16/171 Collins St, Melbourne, Vic., 3000
