= Seagulls Stadium =

Former rugby league venue of NSW, Australia

Coordinates: 28°11′48″S 153°30′21″E

Seagulls Stadium was a rugby league stadium located on Gollan Drive in Tweed Heads West, New South Wales, Australia.

Originally known as Chris Cunningham Field, it was the home ground of the Gold Coast-Tweed Giants rugby league franchise, who entered the New South Wales Rugby League premiership in 1988. Tweed Heads was chosen as the venue for Giants games, despite the club's name indicating they were based in the nearby state of Queensland. This was due to a clause in the expansion licence, which stated that only one team was allowed to play in South East Queensland (this was awarded to the Brisbane Broncos, who also entered the premiership in 1988).

The stadium's capacity was close to 13,500. The record attendance was 13,423 for a match between the Giants and the Broncos on 8 May 1988. This was also the Giants first ever win in the NSWRL Premiership when they shocked the 'Big Brother' Broncos 25–22.

When the Seagulls Leagues Club purchased the Giants franchise in 1990, the team was renamed Gold Coast Seagulls to reflect their home stadium. The club's woeful record on the field (they finished with the wooden spoon three straight seasons, from 1991 to 1993) and the Super League war forced the club to sell the stadium and fold the team after the 1995 season.

Without a viable tenant, and being a largely inferior facility to nearby Carrara Stadium home ground of the Gold Coast Chargers from 1996 to 1998 Seagulls Stadium sat dormant until 1998 when it was dismantled and the site was bulldozed. A housing estate now covers the site.

The stadium's electronic scoreboard, 3500-seat grandstands and 40 corporate boxes were purchased in 2000 by the Wollongong Wolves football (soccer) team, based over 900 kilometres (560 mi) away. These pieces formed the basis of a new 14,000-seat stadium in Figtree, a suburb of Wollongong, which was scheduled to open in 2008.

== See also ==
- Sports on the Gold Coast, Queensland
