= Gold Coast Chargers =

Former Australian rugby league team

Gold Coast

Club information
- Full name: Gold Coast Chargers
- Nicknames: Giants; Seagulls; Chargers
- Colours: Jade, black, purple and gold
- Founded: April 1987
- Exited: 1998

Former details
- Competition: NSWRL/ARL, NRL
- 1998: 19th of 20

Records
- Premierships: Nil
- Runners-up: Nil
- Wooden spoons: 3 (1991, 1992, 1993)

The Gold Coast Chargers were a professional rugby league club which played in the New South Wales Rugby League premiership from 1988 to 1994, the Australian Rugby League premiership from 1995 to 1997, and the National Rugby League premiership in 1998. They first played under the name Gold Coast-Tweed Giants (in silver, black and white colours) from 1988 to 1989, then Gold Coast Seagulls (wearing white, black and red) from 1990 to 1995, very briefly as the Gold Coast Gladiators and finally Gold Coast Chargers (in jade, black, purple and gold uniforms) from 1996 to 1998.

The Gold Coast-Tweed Giants were admitted to the New South Wales Rugby League premiership for the 1988 season, along with the Brisbane Broncos and Newcastle Knights. Due to a clause in Brisbane's licence, only one team (the Broncos) could play in South-East Queensland. As a result, the Giants played out of the now demolished Seagulls Stadium in Tweed Heads West, just over the border in the Northern Rivers of New South Wales, which was home to the Tweed Heads Seagulls RLFC.

Gold Coast and Group 18 provided a nursery of young players in which the club was able to draw on for recruitment.

The Giants were formed, swiftly, after the Internationals Syndicate Including, John Sattler, Peter Gallagher, Bob Hagan and Doug Ryan had missed out on their bid to win the contract to bring a Brisbane team into the Sydney competition. They were joined by veterans Bob McCarthy as coach, Graeme Langlands as team manager and Ken Irvine as sprint coach.

== Gold Coast-Tweed Giants ==
Chart of yearly table positions for Gold Coast Chargers in First Grade Rugby League

A key signing for the club was Ron Gibbs, Second-row forward who had won the 1987 Grand Final while playing for the Manly-Warringah Sea Eagles. Other major recruits were: Chris Close (Manly), Mike Eden (Parramatta), Ben Gonzales (Penrith), Neil Hunt (Parramatta), Billy Johnstone (St George), and Tony Rampling (Eastern Suburbs).

=== 1988 season ===
Position	Pld	Won	Drew	Lost	Bye	Points For	Points Against	Points Differential
15th (of 16)	22	4	1	17	–	238	484	–246

The Giants only won 4 matches during the 1988 NSWRL season. Their first victory was by 25–22 against the Brisbane Broncos in front of 13,423 at Seagulls Stadium,

Ron Gibbs appeared in just 14 games during the season. Another major signing Tony Rampling only made one appearance.

The Giants played their first premiership match at Seagulls Stadium on Saturday 5 March, against the Canterbury Bankstown Bulldogs in which they were defeated 21 points to 10. The team was:

FIRST EVER TEAM
Player	Position
Mike Eden	Fullback
Paul Sheahan	Wing
Chris Close	Centre
Mark Ross	Centre
Bennett King	Wing
Wayne Alberts	Five-eighth
Geoffrey Bagnall	Halfback
Russell Browning	Lock
Eric Kennedy	Second Row
Tony Rampling	Second Row
Jim Cowell	Prop
Billy Johnstone	Hooker
Peter Smith	Prop
Robert Simpkins	Interchange
Troy McCarthy	Interchange
Greg Whitbread	Interchange
Scott Mieni	Interchange
Bob McCarthy	COACH

The Giants avoided coming last in their first season in the premiership. Lack of playing depth and financial concerns hung over the club for the season.

The Giants showcased some of the games emerging young talent halfback Geoffrey "Geoff" Bagnall. Bagnall the former Brisbane Norths showed class in attack and handled the transition to "big time" football with distinction. Bagnall was the architect of a Giants victory over fellow newcomers the Newcastle Knights with a scoreline of 9–0. This win was Gold Coast's first win away from Seagulls Stadium.

Rampaging young forward Keith Neller, who was once touted as a potential State of Origin player, produced strong performances during the season. Most notably his round 17 performance in a 25–10 victory against the Illawarra Steelers.

During the 1988 season Billy Johnstone and Ben Gonzales both appeared in 21 games. Mike Eden scored 79 points (1 try, 36 goals, 3 field goals) and Scott Mieni scored 8 tries to lead the team in try scoring. In February 1989 the Giants were taken over by the Seagulls Leagues Club. This assured the club's financial future.

Two and a half months and eight losses after entering the NSWRL the Gold Coast Giant's scored their historic victory over their rivals the Brisbane Broncos. In front of their biggest crowd and against competition heavyweights the Giants scored a famous 25–22 victory.

In the final they showed resilience and determination to defy a late Broncos challenge. The match was close throughout, with the lead changing five times during the game.

The Giants were deserving winners, and ended nine weeks of frustration and misery where they had come so close to winning but had only a draw to show for their toil.

Billy Johnstone outplayed State of Origin hooker Greg Conescu in a tough personal duel, while Peter Smith, Chris Close and Mark Gee all turned in their best displays of the season for the Giants.

Match score: Gold Coast 25 (Scott Mieni 2, Chris Close, Ron Gibbs tries; Troy McCarthy 4 goals; Mark Gee field Goal) defeated Brisbane 22 (Wally Lewis 2, Terry Matterson, Greg Cornescu tries; Terry Matterson 3 goals)

=== 1989 season ===
Position	Pld	Won	Drew	Lost	Bye	Points For	Points Against	Points Differential
14th (of 16)	22	7	1	14	–	223	383	–160

The 1989 season saw the much heralded arrival of Bob Lindner. He would write his name into the record books by becoming the club's first State of Origin representative when he played for Queensland in the first State of Origin match in 1989. Unfortunately Lindner's appearances for the Giants were limited to only 10 games. Lindner would leave the club after only one season.

The Giants won seven games and drew one in the 1989 season which was a great improvement on their first season. The month of June proved to be a memorable on. They went undefeated for four weeks drawing with Western Suburbs 12 all, and defeating; the Newcastle Knights 12–6, the North Sydney Bears 6–4, and the Manly-Warringah Sea Eagles 29–6. The Victory against The Sea Eagles was the club's biggest win at the time.

Keith Neller suffered several injuries during the 1989 campaign that limited his effectiveness for the Giants

Home crowd attendances improved despite very poor weather. The club's leading points scorer for the 1989 season was again Mike Eden who scored a mere 63 points (3 tries, 25 goals, 1 field goal). The leading try scorer was Peter Benson who scored 7 tries. The worrying aspect for the club overall was that the team could only score 34 tries, 3 fewer than in 1988. Although the club showed great improvement in defense conceding 101 fewer points than the previous season.

Major Sponsor

- Seagulls Leagues Club

== Gold Coast Seagulls ==
Logo of the Gold Coast Seagulls

=== 1990 season ===
Position	Pld	Won	Drew	Lost	Bye	Points For	Points Against	Points Differential
15th (of 16)	22	4	0	18	–	233	567	–334

The Gold Coast Giants' name was changed to Gold Coast Seagulls, but although the Tweed reference was dropped from the name, they continued to play out of Seagulls Stadium. Along with a change of name came a change of colours to black, white, and red.

The biggest news in the history of Gold Coast followed the Seagulls most traumatic year in the NSWRL. The revelation that former Australian captain and State of Origin player Wally Lewis, would be joining the club for the 1991 season after a falling out with the Brisbane Broncos and their coach Wayne Bennett. This news came upon a season where the club was expected to show further improvement.

A buying program prior to the season landed the signatures of 1987 Manly premiership player, NSW Origin representative and Australian international Phil Daley, former Queensland State of Origin centre Brett French, Manly half Paul Shaw, and former St George outside back Clinton Mohr. However these players could not help deliver the anticipated wins. Shaw, who like Daley was a member of Manly's 1987 premiership side and had led Manly's reserve grade team to the 1988 premiership, joined the Seagulls looking for a permanent first grade spot after being stuck in reserve grade behind Geoff Toovey, Cliff Lyons and Des Hasler at Manly

Brett French (21 games) and Mohr (20 games), rendered good service throughout the season, but 1986 Kangaroo tourist Daley, and Shaw failed to reproduce the form that earned a premiership playing together for Manly.

The 1990 season started well with a round four victory over the South Sydney Rabbitohs, but this was to be their last victory for three months. Their quest to ward off the Wooden Spoon looked forlorn for much of the season. But the Seagulls finished the season with three victories in their final six matches. And in doing so, leapfrogged 1989 minor premiers South Sydney. The Seagulls overtook Souths with a then club record 38–12 win in August, which was also the club's first win away from home. Brett French and Robert Grogan both scored 2 tries each.

Gold Coast coach Bob McCarthy dealt with speculation over his future for most of the season. Although it wasn't until the final match of the season that he was told his services were no longer required. He was replaced for the 1991 season by reserve grade coach and former Canterbury-Bankstown (1973–77) and Leeds (1985) first grade coach Malcolm Clift.

The Seagulls were happy with the development of youngsters Tony Durheim, Eddie Fallins, Michael Searle and Brett Horsnell. However disappointment continued for two of their young stars. Halfback Geoffrey Bagnall, who was expected to help lift the struggling side, only made nine run on starts with the club, while veteran forward Keith Neller made only 10 appearances. Injury and some poor form cost Neller a chance to play State of Origin football for Queensland in 1990.

The Seagulls veteran hooker, Billy Johnstone announced his retirement at the end of the season. He appeared in 61 games for the club since its inception. Ron Gibbs also announced he would return to Sydney when he signed to play for Western Suburbs at the end of the season.

The top point scorer for The Seagulls was Peter Benson with 44 points (1 Try, 19 goals). The leading try scorers for the team scoring 6 tries each were; Brett French, Clinton Mohr and three-quarter Mark Ross.

The Seagulls showed steady improvement with their crowd figures. From an average home crowd of 5,495 in 1988 support grew to 6624 in 1990. Overall crowds had grown from 6,199 to 7,175.

=== 1991 season ===
Position	Pld	Won	Drew	Lost	Bye	Points For	Points Against	Points Differential
16th (of 16)	22	2	1	19	–	240	492	–252

The 1991 season was the worst season to that point for Gold Coast in their club's history. However, the club produced its first international player when Wally Lewis was selected for the first test of the 1991 Trans-Tasman Test series against New Zealand, while the reserve grade team made the finals series for the first time. The club's on field results were the worst in its short history, with just two wins and a draw. The team's only wins for the season were a 16–8 home win over Parramatta at Seagulls Stadium in Round 5, while their last win for the year came in Round 9 with a 16–12 win over fellow 1988 team Newcastle at Marathon Stadium. The Seagulls then lost their final 13 games of the season, with their closest loss coming in Round 21 (the penultimate round) when they gallantly went down 18–20 to the Brisbane Broncos in front of 12,620 fans at home.

While the arrival of Wally Lewis failed to bring the on field results, crowds rose 29 percent at Seagulls Stadium and 36 percent overall, a factor that could only be attributed to the arrival of Lewis. In all Lewis played only 14 of 22 matches for Gold Coast in 1991, also missing games while captaining Queensland to a 2–1 Origin series win over New South Wales in what would be his final Origin series as a player.

Two of the better performances of the season came against the defending premiers, the Canberra Raiders. In the round four at Bruce Stadium, the Seagulls went down 20–18 to the Raiders who were missing Gary Belcher, Laurie Daley and Bradley Clyde. And in Round 19 played at Seagulls Stadium the Seagulls led 10–8 with only ten minutes to play, before the Raiders managed a late victory with a try to Australian captain Mal Meninga.

Young Brett Horsnell playing in his third season with The Seagulls proved to be one of the most consistent and durable players for the team in 1991. Playing centre and some lock. Horsnell appeared in 20 out of 22 matches and played solid football for the team.

Former Balmain Tigers, NSW and Australian representative winger Larry Corowa made a surprise return to First Grade football at the age of 33 after an absence of seven seasons. His return in Round 14 against the South Sydney Rabbitohs saw him playing fullback, he also scored a try in the match.

1991 saw the club farewell foundation players Geoff Bagnall, Chris Close, Ben Gonzales, and Robert Simpkins. These farewells were offset by the arrival of young goal kicking forward Wayne Bartrim who played at both hooker and lock for the club.

The club's leading point scorer for the season was Wayne Bartrim who scored 38 points (4 tries and 11 goals). The club's leading try scorer was Brett French with 5.

=== 1992 season ===
Position	Pld	Won	Drew	Lost	Bye	Points For	Points Against	Points Differential
16th (of 16)	22	6	1	15	–	288	423	–135

The 1992 season for The Seagulls saw the arrival of Canberra Raiders trio Brent Todd, Paul Martin and Jason Gregory, Queensland State of Origin representative Steve Jackson, Australian and Queensland star Dale Shearer (yet another Manly premiership player from 1987), Queensland and Newcastle Knights forward Mike McLean, and utility player Peter Gill from St George.

However the arrival of these players didn't help the club avoid coming last in the NSWRL Premiership for the second consecutive season. Injury and Origin limited Shearer to just seven games, while former Canberra Raiders lower grade halfback Jason Gregory suffered a serious neck injury in the pre-season tournament ending his football career.

A heroic twelve man victory against the Illawarra Steelers in round three at home should have ranked among the most courageous wins in Gold Coast's short history. New Zealand test prop Brent Todd was sent off in the opening minutes, but the club battled on to win the match 18–8. However the joy was short lived as the NSWRL stripped the Seagulls of their two competition points for fielding an illegal replacement. Gold Coast had used Ken Jackson as a fifth replacement instead of using only the maximum of four.

Gold Coast finished the season with eleven points from twenty two games, finishing last. However, if The Seagulls had retained the points the club would have finished ahead of Parramatta on percentage.

Finishing with the Wooden Spoon was an inglorious end for Wally Lewis. During the season Lewis showed the qualities that elevated him to among the games greats. However, age and injury had caught up to the 32-year-old, and he also lacked support from his mostly inexperienced teammates. Lewis also made history by becoming the first captain/coach of an NSWRL team since Bob Fulton with Eastern Suburbs in 1979.

However, on Saturday, 29 August 1992 in front of a crowd of 10,160 at Seagulls Stadium the team sent Lewis into retirement by defeating the defending premiers Penrith by 12 points to 8. Lewis capped off the match by scoring a try.

Other highlights during the season were victories over South Sydney 20–6, Balmain 26-14 and a 20 all draw with Newcastle. The victories over Penrith and Balmain were The Seagulls first over those sides. Along with a 12–10 defeat of Canberra in round six.

Crowds at Seagulls Stadium rose 11 percent to an average of 9,468 per match.

The club's leading point scorer for the season was Wayne Bartrim who scored 46 points (3 tries and 17 goals). The club's leading try scorers crossed 6 times. They were Danny Peacock and Steve Jackson.

At the end of the year, the Seagulls travelled to Adelaide for a game against a South Australian "select" team on the night before the 1992 Australian Grand Prix. The match, billed as Wally Lewis' last game for the Seagulls, drew a poor crowd of less than 5,000 to the Thebarton Oval. The Seagulls won the game thanks to a Lewis sideline conversion. Playing for the South Australians were St George Dragons 1992 Grand Final players Jeff Hardy and Ricky Walford, as well as Lewis' long time friend and Qld teammate Paul Vautin who had retired from playing at the end of 1991.

=== 1993 season ===
Position	Pld	Won	Drew	Lost	Bye	Points For	Points Against	Points Differential
16th (of 16)	22	1	0	21	–	229	572	–343

The 1993 season saw The Seagulls win their third consecutive Wooden Spoon. The side came away from the 1993 campaign with a single victory against the Newcastle Knights producing a scoreline of 22–6.

One win saw Gold Coast produce its worst result in six years in the NSWRL. In-fighting between coach Wally Lewis and management threatened to tear the club apart. The result of the disastrous events saw football manager Greg Bandiera sacked, Wally Lewis resign and many of the club's top players including Brent Todd, Jason Hetherington, Paul Martin, Craig Weston and Scott Sattler leave the club.

1993 saw the team suffer its worse losing streak, sixteen games. During one two-week period the side suffered terrible losses to Manly Warringah 46-0 and The Newcastle Knights 50–6.

On 16 June 1993 Gold Coast was fined $50,000 for exceeding their 1992 salary cap by $150,000.

A positive to come from the season was the performances of young players such as Adrian Vowles, Kevin Campion, Jason Hetherington, Jamie Goddard and John Skardon.

Vowles, a former Charleville junior was voted the club's player of the year. Along with Kevin Campion and Jason Hetherington, Vowles were included in the Norwich Rising Star class of 1993.

The major highlight of the club's year was the performance of the reserve grade side, which qualified for the semi-finals for the second time in three seasons. The young Gold Coast team won a play off for fifth against St George, before they were eliminated by Manly in the minor preliminary semi final.

Dale Shearer became the club's second Australian representative. He also announced his decision to remain with the club which provided a boost for the 1994 season. Other Seagulls who represented in 1993 were Steve Jackson, Queensland. And Brent Todd, New Zealand.

The club's leading point scorer for the season was Steve Weston who scored 30 points (2 tries and 11 goals). The club's leading try scorer was Adrian Vowles with 5.

=== 1994 season ===
Position	Pld	Won	Drew	Lost	Bye	Points For	Points Against	Points Differential
15th (of 16)	22	5	1	16	–	363	618	–225

The 1994 season saw modest improvement with The Seagulls. The side won five games during the 1994 campaign which included impressive wins against the eventual premiers The Canberra Raiders 8–4 and rivals The Brisbane Broncos 25–12. Inspired by Craig Coleman and Dale "Rowdy" Shearer Gold Coast outplayed the reigning premiers Brisbane in front of more than 22,000 at Carrara Stadium in round two of the premiership.

Other wins against Newcastle, Parramatta, Balmain and a draw against Penrith saw the club avoid the Wooden Spoon.

Stretched finances saw limited recruiting for the 1994 season. The Seagulls welcomed Craig Coleman and Queensland State of Origin player Adrian Brunker.

However the modest gains won during the season were offset by the loss of almost an entire first grade side at the end of the season. The arrival of new clubs debuting in the 1995 season saw the team plundered. The club's losses included Adrian Vowles, Paul Galea and David Bouveng to the North Queensland Cowboys, Dale "Rowdy" Shearer, Brett Horsnell and Ray Herring to the South Queensland Crushers, talented lock Wayne Bartrim to the St George Dragons and Robert Tocco to the Canterbury Bankstown Bulldogs.

In comparison to other clubs to enter the premiership in the 1980s – Canberra, Illawarra, Newcastle and Brisbane – Gold Coast's returns were modest in the extreme. The club's only two internationals (the Broncos had 19) were players who had previously been capped while playing for previous clubs. No-one player had played 100 first grade games for the club in the seven years they had been part of the competition (the Newcastle Knights had five who had played 110 or more). No single grand-final appearance in any grade. No-one had scored more than two tries in a first-grade game or more than 20 first grade tries for the club.

In 1994 the club produced one representative player, Adrian Vowles for the second State of Origin game. He promptly left the club at the end of the season for North Queensland.

The club's leading point scorer for the season was Wayne Bartim who scored 124 points (4 tries and 42 goals). The club's leading try scorer was Russell Bussian with 7. Scoring 124 points, Bartim was the first player in Gold Coast history to score more than 100 points in a season. He departed the club with a personal tally of 224 first grade points (18 tries and 76 goals).

=== 1995 season ===
Position	Pld	Won	Drew	Lost	Bye	Points For	Points Against	Points Differential
17th (of 20)	22	4	1	17	–	350	628	–278

In the 1995 ARL season the Seagulls won just four matches. However they avoided the Wooden Spoon by coming 17th position in the competition. Two convincing victories over the South Sydney Rabbitohs 28–6 and 22–2, a 22–18 win over the Parramatta Eels and a 10–8 win over the North Queensland Cowboys were the few on field highlights. The team also drew 14–14 with the North Sydney Bears.

The club's top performers again were the Reserve Grade team coached by Phil Economidis, which qualified for the finals and made it as far as the preliminary final. Losing out to eventual premiers the Newcastle Knights.

Individually there were some notable performances. Young centre Ben Ikin was selected to play for Queensland in the State of Origin series after only a handful of first grade appearances. In his selection Ikin became the youngest player in history to be selected for State of Origin football.

Danny Peacock scored a club record 14 tries and recorded the club's first ever hat trick in a 48–24 loss to the Penrith Panthers. Peacock took over as the top tryscorer in the club's history with 28 touchdowns.

However sadly for the Seagulls, both Ikin and Peacock departed the club at the end of the season. Ikin to the North Sydney Bears and Peacock to the South Queensland Crushers. Other notable departures were Craig Coleman and Peter Gill, who both signed deals to play in the Super League.

1995 was the club's worst year defensively allowing 628 points in 22 matches. Among their poorest efforts were a 50–10 loss to the North Sydney Bears, a 44–16 loss to the Auckland Warriors and a thumping 56–6 defeat by the Canberra Raiders.

Crowds at Seagulls Stadium reflected the poor results. The average of 6781 in 1995 was down from 7190 in 1994.

With the Super League war in full flight at the end of the season, the Seagulls Leagues Club pulled out their support and the club was closed at the end of the year.

Major Sponsors

- Seagulls Leagues Club
- Tooheys
- Pellerman's Wines

== Gold Coast Gladiators ==
Logo of the short-lived Gold Coast Gladiators.

The Seagulls Club's licence was purchased by local property millionaire and entrepreneur Jeff Muller who moved the club across the border into Queensland before the start of the 1996 rugby league season and the club became known as the Gold Coast Gladiators, with the team being based at Carrara Stadium. With new colours, the club then enjoyed some immediate success in winning the Plate Trophy at that year's pre-season World Sevens tournament, the only silverware the Gold Coast had ever won. However, after having demonstrated the club's potential and appointing a coach who would go on to win the Dally M award for Coach of the Year, Phil Econimides, the ARL revoked Muller's licence before the commencement of the 1996 ARL season.

== Gold Coast Chargers ==
From the brink of oblivion the new look Gold Coast Chargers regained respect and credibility in 1996. On the day rugby league turned 100 the Gold Coast had reached its lowest ebb. The Gold Coast Seagulls were finished as a footballing entity, and it seemed all hopes for the club were lost.

However, the ARL recognised the importance of keeping the game alive in the Gold Coast. They appointed a board of directors chaired by NSW and ARL board member Tom Bellew and named top level administrator Paul Broughton chief executive of what was an essentially a brand new operation.

=== 1996 season ===
Position	Pld	Won	Drew	Lost	Bye	Points For	Points Against	Points Differential
18th (of 20)	22	5	1	16	–	359	521	–162

During the 1996 season the club won five matches which was an impressive achievement. Newly appointed head coach Phil Economidis led a team that was hastily assembled over the Summer. Joining the new team were Martin Bella, Lee Oudenryn, Dave Watson and Brett Plowman.

Sporting a new strip of jade, black, purple and gold, the Gold Coast Chargers made their 1996 debut at Carrara Stadium on 23 March. Captained by former Kiwi international Dave Watson the Chargers, having only three members of the last Gold Coast side from 1995, acquitted themselves well in a 42–26 defeat against the North Sydney Bears in front of more than 8000 supporters.

In round two against the Manly Warringah Sea Eagles the team managed to score four tries, which was more than any other team managed throughout 199, and when they met the South Sydney Rabbitohs at Redfern Oval, the Chargers broke through for their first victory 18–16.

They backed up this performance with a mighty effort against Manly at Carrara. The Sea Eagles team was brimming with international class players, yet could only manage a 10–6 result against a team thrown together in a month.

Victories over the Illawarra Steelers at Carrara 28–20 and the multi-million dollar Parramatta Eels at Parramatta Stadium 27–14 made the league world sit up and take notice. The Chargers had moved to 10th position after six rounds. A monumental achievement considering early off-field drama.

However sustaining the high level of their performances on a weekly basis became increasingly difficult and the Chargers came back to the field throughout the second half of the season. They only managed one draw and a win in the final 12 rounds. But it was a massive win over their new northern neighbours. The Gold Coast thrashed the hapless South Queensland Crushers 52–6 at Suncorp Stadium, establishing a record score and a record winning margin for the club. And that day their achieved their third away win for the season, another first for the Gold Coast.

Brendan Hurst was the club's leading point scorer for the season with 107 points (3 tries, 47 goals and a field goal), while Lee Oudenryn crossed for 8 tries.

=== 1997 season ===
Position	Pld	Won	Drew	Lost	Bye	Points For	Points Against	Points Differential
7th (of 12)	22	10	1	11	–	438	466	–28

After having been in the league for eight seasons, the Chargers that made the Gold Coast club's only finals appearance in the Australian Rugby League's half of 1997's split competition.

Building upon the success of the previous season, the rugby league community was made to take notice of the team on the first Saturday of the season. The Chargers scored their first ever victory over the Western Suburbs Magpies. New winger Shane Russell crossed for a club record 4 tries.

In a golden period for the club between May and June the Chargers won five and drew one of seven matches. Among their scalps were eventual premiers the Newcastle Knights, whom they beat 32–24 at Carrara, and semi-finalists the Illawarra Steelers 11–10 at Carrara.

Later in the season they broke through for their first ever win against the Manly Warringah Sea Eagles since 1989 when they thumped the defending premiers 25-10 before 15,872 fans at Carrara.

The charge towards the finals looked to end though when they were humbled 28-6 by Illawarra in round 22 at Win Stadium. However the South Queensland Crushers, playing their last ever match, managed to knock Wests out of the running and give the Chargers their first ever finals berth.

On 5 September 1997, playing their first ever finals match. The Chargers who were written off by most, defeated the highly fancied Illawarra Steelers 25–14. The match was played at the Neutral venue of Parramatta Stadium. The Chargers led 14–4 at half-time and never let the Steelers into the match.

The finals run ended in the second week at the hands of the Sydney City Roosters. The Chargers were defeated 32–10. But this could not take away from what was a remarkable season.

Coach Phil Economidis was named coach of the year.

The acquisition of Wes Patten from the Balmain Tigers was one of the club's most important buys. The 23-year-old had failed to establish himself at the Tigers. But the Chargers were willing to give him a chance and he didn't disappoint. Patten played in all 24 matches for the Crushers crossing for 12 tries and kicking a field goal.

Both Jamie Goddard and Jeremy Schloss played their way into the Queensland State of Origin team.

Veteran Martin Bella ended his career on a high note with a number of storming late-season efforts. Coach Economidis took full advantage of the unlimited interchange rule to use the 33-year-old in Bella in short, effective bursts.

Leading point scorer for the season was Brendan Hurst with 88 (3 tries, 37 goals and 2 field goals), while Wes Patten led the tryscorers with 11 touchdowns.

Home crowds showed improvement on 1996 figures. The average crowd at Carrara, 8,958 was up 24 percent.

The increase in local support, plus the better than expected results on the field, convinced the club officials that the Chargers should strive to remain a separate entity in the game. Discussions with the financially embattled South Queensland Crushers to form the game's first joint venture club were aborted late in the year.

=== 1998 season ===
Position	Pld	Won	Drew	Lost	Bye	Points For	Points Against	Points Differential
19th (of 20)	24	4	0	20	–	289	654	–365

The 1998 season would prove to be the Gold Coast Chargers last.

Boardroom in-fighting, political agendas and an almost annual procession of administrators, coaching staff and players greatly affected the club's stability and Gold Coast was officially disbanded in early December 1998.

After a season of progression in 1997 the club once again went backwards in 1998.

Two things happened. The Chargers allowed three of their best players to leave, and the Australian Rugby League and Super League united. The second event could have provided a windfall for the Gold Coast club. The Hunter Mariners, who were owned by News Limited, staging a desperate battle for their own survival offered the Chargers first pick at their playing staff plus a five million dollar grant. Among the conditions were that a number of Mariners' staff members, including the chief executive were to be included in the package. The Chargers turned down the offer.

The Gold Coast missed the opportunity of signing Richard Swain, Brett Kimmorley, Scott Hill, Paul Marquet and John Carlaw – all of whom signed with the Melbourne Storm. So did Marcus Bai, whom was released by the Chargers after only one season with the club. When the Storm met the Chargers at Olympic Park Stadium in May, Melbourne inflicted the biggest loss on the Gold Coast in its history, 62–6.

The decision to knock back the Mariners' offer angered Coach Phil Economidis, who saw the difficulties that lay ahead in a 20 team competition with a significantly diminished outfit. Not only had Bai been allowed to leave, but so had Brendan Hurst and Jeremy Schloss.

The 1998 season was among the worst in the club's undistinguished history, with four wins leaving them equal last with the Western Suburbs Magpies. Only the Magpies worse points differential saved the Chargers from the Wooden Spoon.

Halfback Wes Patten was ineffective in 1998. His inconsistency forced Economidis to alternate him between first grade, the interchange bench and the Queensland Cup competition.

The Chargers attack was the worst in the league, scoring only 54 tries all season.

The resounding success of the season was the form of Jamie Goddard. Goddard was credited with more tackles than any other player in the competition. He won selection in the Queensland State of Origin team for the third State of Origin match. Goddard assumed the Chargers captaincy midway through the season.

The club's leading point scorer for the season was Graham Mackay with 78 points (6 tries, 27 goals). Mackay was also the leading tryscorer.

Major Sponsors

- Chandlers
- Home Timber & Hardware

== Stadium ==
In their first eight seasons, the Giants/Seagulls played their matches at Seagulls Stadium. When the Seagulls Leagues Club purchased the Giants franchise in 1990, the team was renamed Gold Coast Seagulls to reflect their home stadium. The club's on field and the Super League war forced the club to sell the stadium and fold the team after the 1995 season.

The stadium's capacity was close to 13,500. The record attendance was 13,423 for a match between the Giants and the Broncos on 8 May 1988.

The newly named Gold Coast Chargers relocated to the larger (23,000 capacity) Carrara Stadium for the 1996 season. They played at the stadium for three years.

== Club jerseys ==
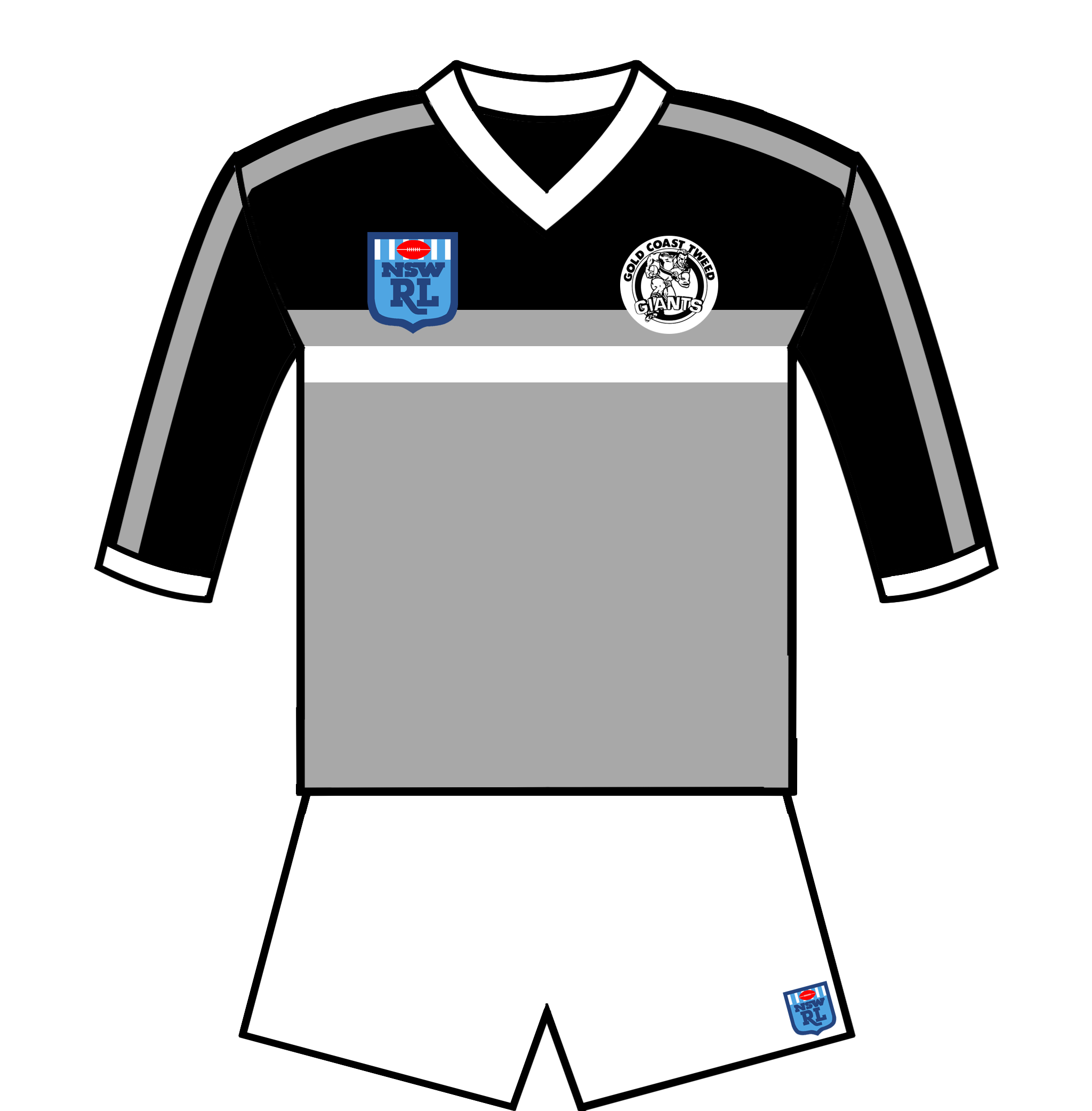
1988–1989; Giants

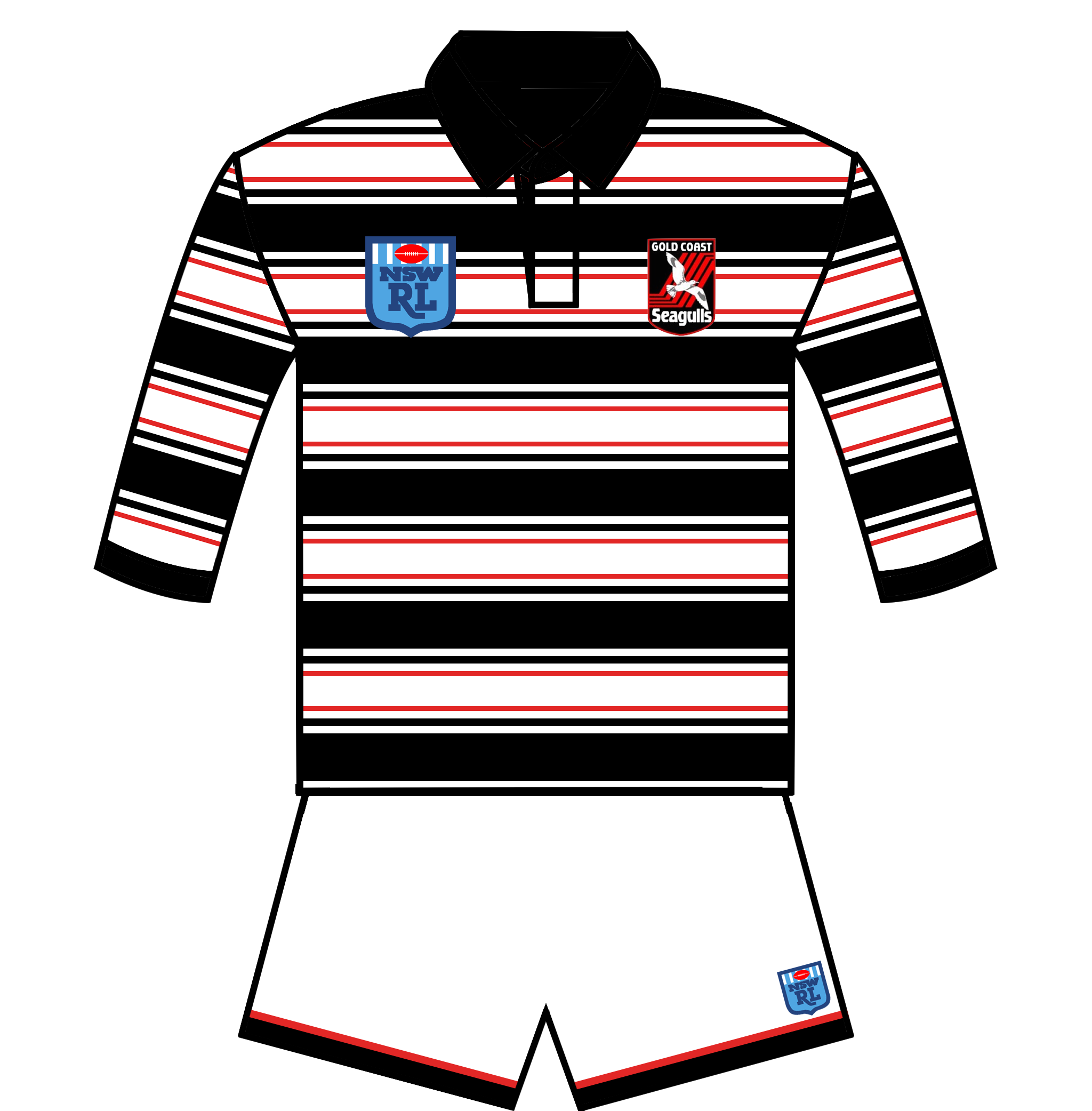
1990–1992; Seagulls

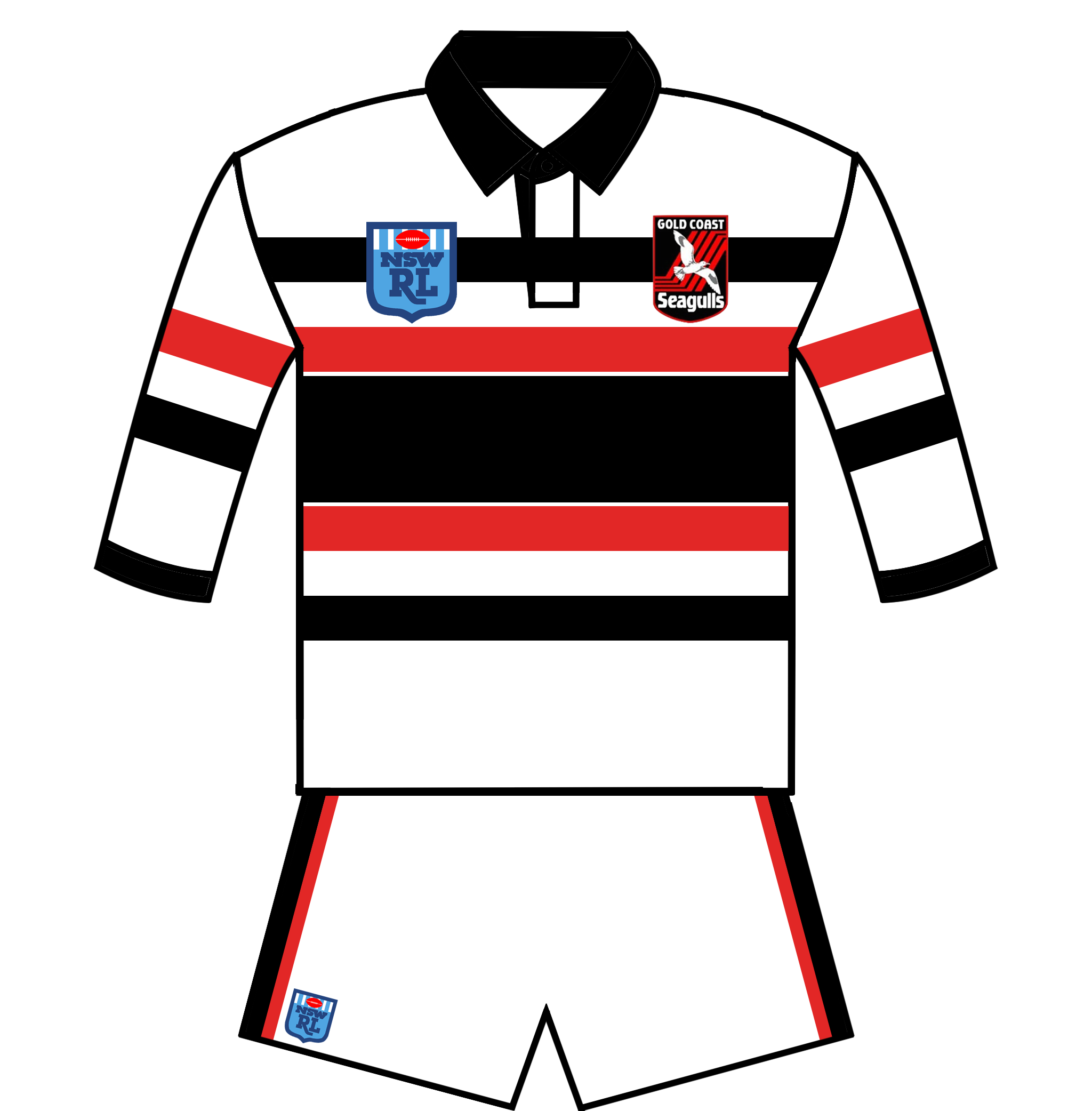
1993–1995; Seagulls

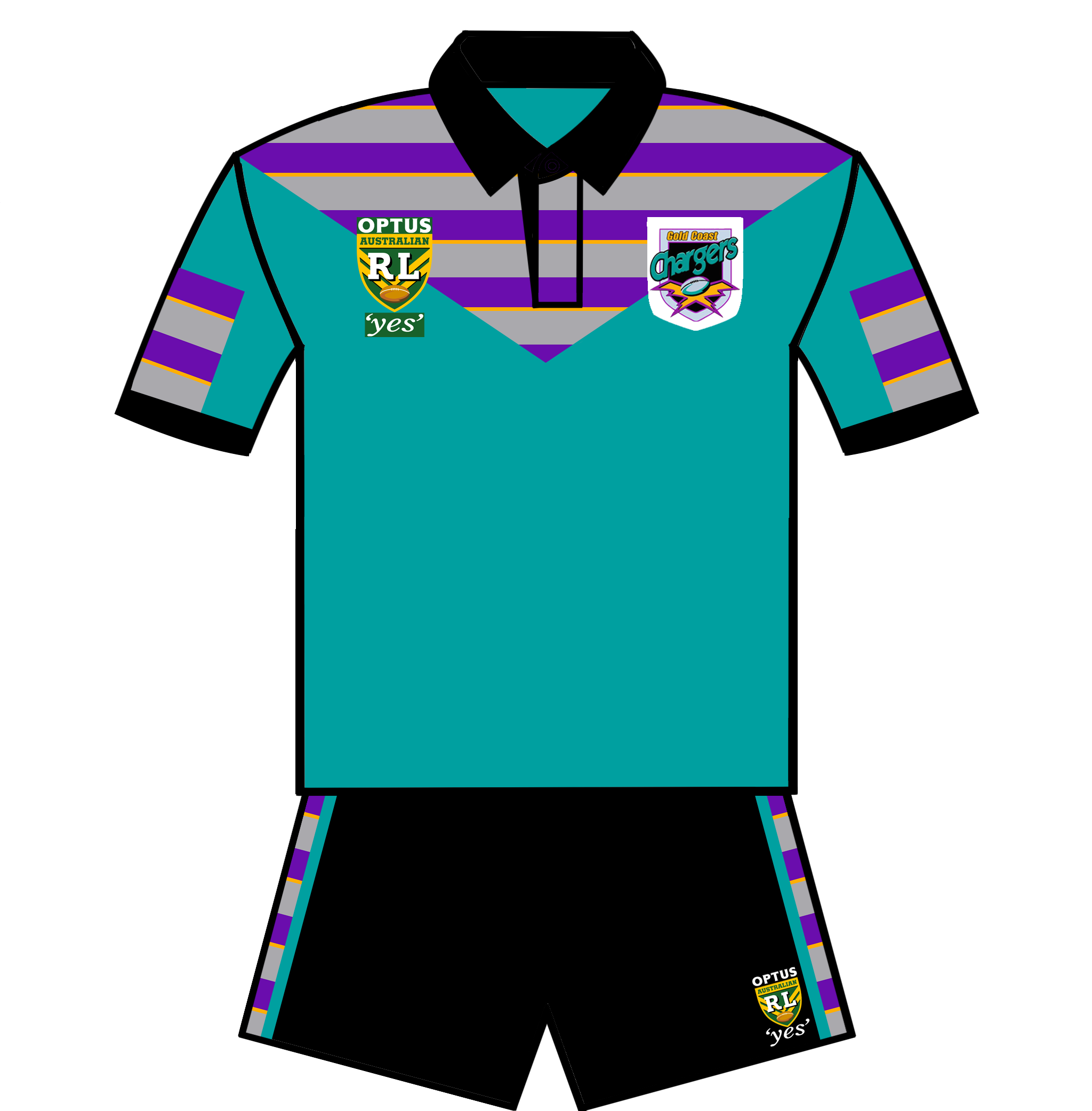
1996–1998; Chargers

== Club records ==
Jamie Goddard holds the record of number of games played for the club with 86. Wayne Bartrim was the most prolific points scorer for the club. He holds the records for most points in a season with 124 (10 tries and 42 goals) from the 1994 season. Bartrim shares the most points scored in a single match with Brendan Hurst by scoring 20 points. Hurst holds the record for most points scored for the club with 285 (3 tries, 125 goals and 3 field goals) scored between 1994 and 1997. The club's leading try scorer was Danny Peacock with 28 tries scored between 1991 and 1995. Peacock also holds the record for most tries in a season with 14, scored in 1995. Shane Russell scored four tries in a game played against the Western Suburbs Magpies, and this was the club record.

== Notable players ==
Australia

- (Australia) Wayne Bartrim
- (Australia) Martin Bella
- (Australia) Preston Campbell
- (Australia) Chris Close
- (Australia) Craig Coleman
- (Australia) Phil Daley
- (Australia) Ben Ikin
- (Australia) Steve Jackson
- (Australia) Wally Lewis
- (Australia) Bob Lindner
- (Australia) Graham Mackay
- (Australia) Keith Neller
- (Australia) Paul Martin
- (Australia) Dale Shearer
- (Australia) Adrian Vowles

New Zealand

- (New Zealand) Brent Todd

== Club Internationals ==
Australia

- (Australia) Wally Lewis (1991)
- (Australia) Dale Shearer (1993)

New Zealand

- (New Zealand) Brent Todd (1992–93)

Great Britain

- (United Kingdom) Daryl Powell (1991)

Papua New Guinea

- (Papua New Guinea) Marcus Bai (1997)
- (Papua New Guinea) Tom O'Reilly (1997)

Wales

- (Wales) Kevin Ellis (1996)

Italy

- (Italy) Frank Napoli (1999)

== State Of origin representatives ==
Queensland

- (Queensland) Bob Lindner (1989)
- (Queensland) Wally Lewis (1991)
- (Queensland) Dale Shearer (1992–93)
- (Queensland) Steve Jackson (1992–93)
- (Queensland) Mike McLean (1992)
- (Queensland) Adrian Vowles (1994)
- (Queensland) Ben Ikin (1995)
- (Queensland) Jamie Goddard (1997–98)
- (Queensland) Jeremy Schloss (1997)

== Representative coaching staff ==
Queensland

- (Queensland) Wally Lewis (Coach – 1993)

== Gold Coast Titans ==
A new Gold Coast rugby league team, nicknamed the Titans, entered the NRL in 2007.

While they have no official or statistical ties to the three former Gold Coast teams listed here, the Titans have stated that they see themselves as a continuation of these former Gold Coast teams: they play out of the same city and in 2007 played at the same ground as the Chargers did, Carrara before moving to Skilled Park, Robina.

During the annual NRL Heritage Round, the Titans wear a strip modeled off the 1992 Gold Coast Seagulls jersey, though the colours however remain those of the Titans (sky blue and gold stripes on a white jersey).
