= 1988 NSWRL season =

Rugby league competition

1988 New South Wales Rugby League premiership
- Teams: 16
- Premiers: Canterbury-Bankstown (6th title)
- Minor premiers: Cronulla-Sutherland (1st title)
- Matches played: 183
- Points scored: 6,559
- Attendance: 1,966,658
- Top points scorer(s): Gary Belcher (218)
- Wooden spoon: Western Suburbs Magpies (15th spoon)
- Rothmans Medal: Barry Russell
- Top try-scorer(s): John Ferguson (20)

The 1988 NSWRL season was the 81st season of professional rugby league football in Australia, and saw the first expansion of the New South Wales Rugby League Premiership outside the borders of New South Wales, and another expansion outside of Sydney, with the addition of three new teams: the Brisbane Broncos, Newcastle Knights and Gold Coast-Tweed Giants. The largest NSWRL premiership yet, sixteen clubs competed during the 1988 season, with the J J Giltinan Shield for minor premiers going to Cronulla-Sutherland Sharks. The finals culminated in a grand final for the Winfield Cup between the Canterbury-Bankstown Bulldogs and Balmain Tigers.
This season NSWRL teams also competed for the 1988 Panasonic Cup.

== Season summary ==
1988 was the year of the Australian Bicentenary celebrations, and on 4 March, the season opened with the first game of rugby league played at the newly built Sydney Football Stadium. The St. George Dragons defeated the Eastern Suburbs Roosters 24–14. Easts and South Sydney would use the SFS as their home venue from 1988. This saw the end of both the Sydney Sports Ground (which closed due to the building of the SFS) and Redfern Oval as regular venues.

The brand new Brisbane Broncos club, featuring Australian Kangaroos captain Wally Lewis and starting their first ever season of football, played their first match against the previous season's premiers the Manly-Warringah Sea Eagles and won 44–10.

Eventual grand finalists the Balmain Tigers had a dreadful start to the season with six wins and five losses by the end of the first full round. But their plight was rescued by a masterstroke from their chief executive Keith Barnes. The Great Britain side was touring Australia that season and in strict secrecy Barnes negotiated to have the English captain and centre Ellery Hanley – judged the best player in the English competition the previous season and an undoubted world-class player – to join the Tigers. Barnes got to the NSWRL to register Hanley at 4:55 pm on 30 June, just five minutes inside the deadline for signing players for that season.

The 1988 season's Rothmans Medallist was Cronulla-Sutherland's Barry Russell. The Dally M Award went to Russell's teammate Gavin Miller, and Rugby League Week gave its player of the year award to Balmian's hooker, Ben Elias.

Twenty-two regular season rounds were played in total from March till August, with Cronulla-Sutherland winning their first ever minor premiership since joining the competition in 1967. Penrith and Balmain finished on equal points in fifth place and played each other for the place in the top five, alongside Cronulla, Canterbury, Canberra and Manly.

The grand finals;

- Canterbury-Bankstown Bulldogs vs Balmain Tigers (Senior Grade)
- Eastern Suburbs Roosters vs Manly Warringah Sea Eagles (Reserve Grade)
- Parramatta Eels vs Eastern Suburbs Roosters (Under 21s Grade)
- St. George Dragons vs Balmain Tigers (Mid-week)

The winners in all grades were:

- Canterbury-Bankstown Bulldogs (Senior Grade)
- Manly Warringah Sea Eagles (Reserve Grade)
- Parramatta Eels (Under 21s Grade)
- St. George Dragons (Mid-week)

The Tests;

- Australia vs Great Britain
- Australia vs Rest of the World

The State of Origin;

- Queensland vs New South Wales

=== Teams ===
This season saw the premiership's first expansion since 1982 with the addition of three newly created teams: the Brisbane Broncos, the Gold Coast-Tweed Giants and the Newcastle Knights. This brought the League another step closer to becoming a national competition as a total of sixteen teams, the largest number in the tournament's history, contested the premiership, including five Sydney-based foundation teams, another six from Sydney, two from greater New South Wales, two from Queensland, and one from the Australian Capital Territory.

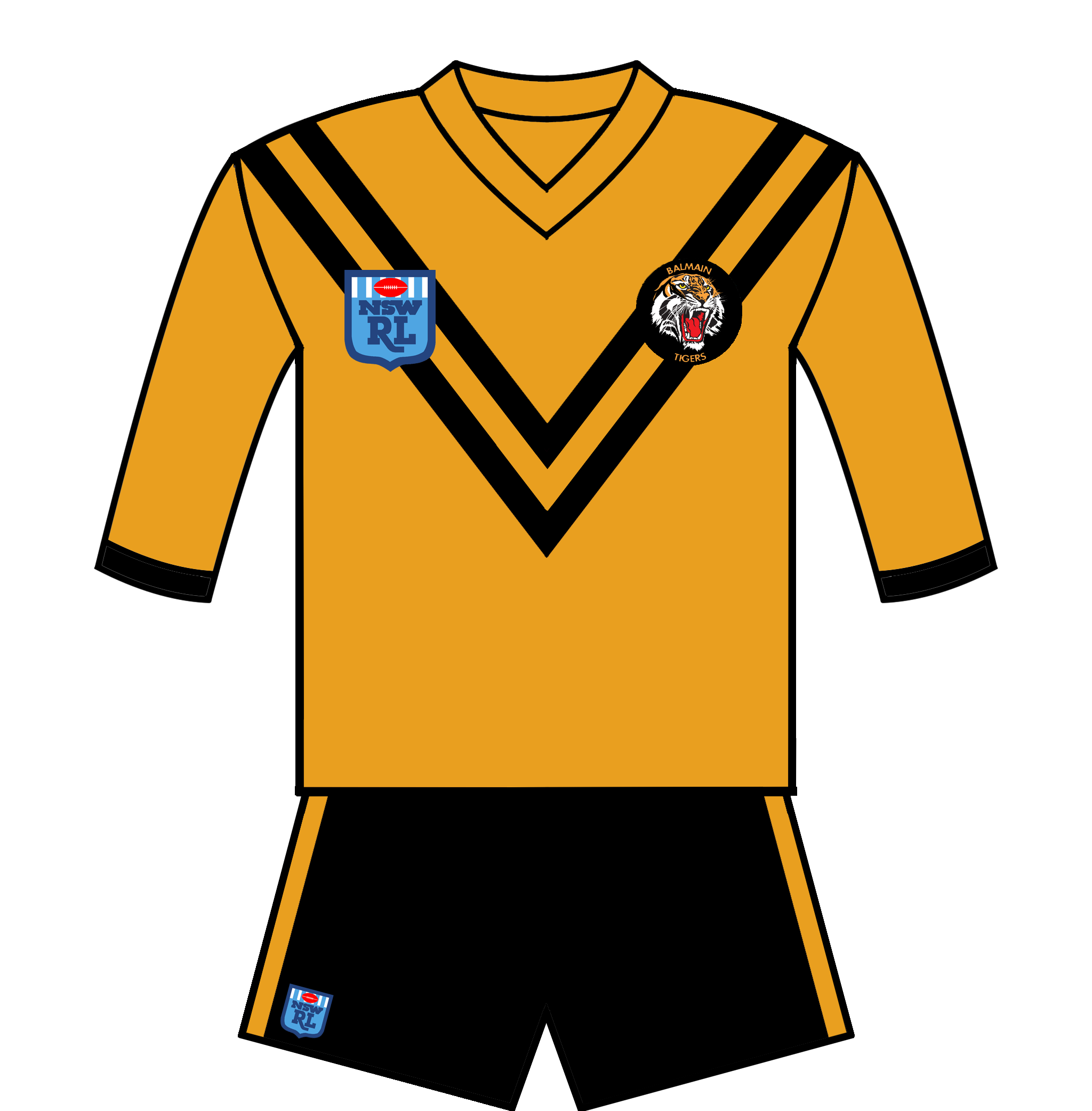
Balmain; Tigers 81st season Ground: Leichhardt Oval; Coach: Warren Ryan; Captain: Wayne Pearce

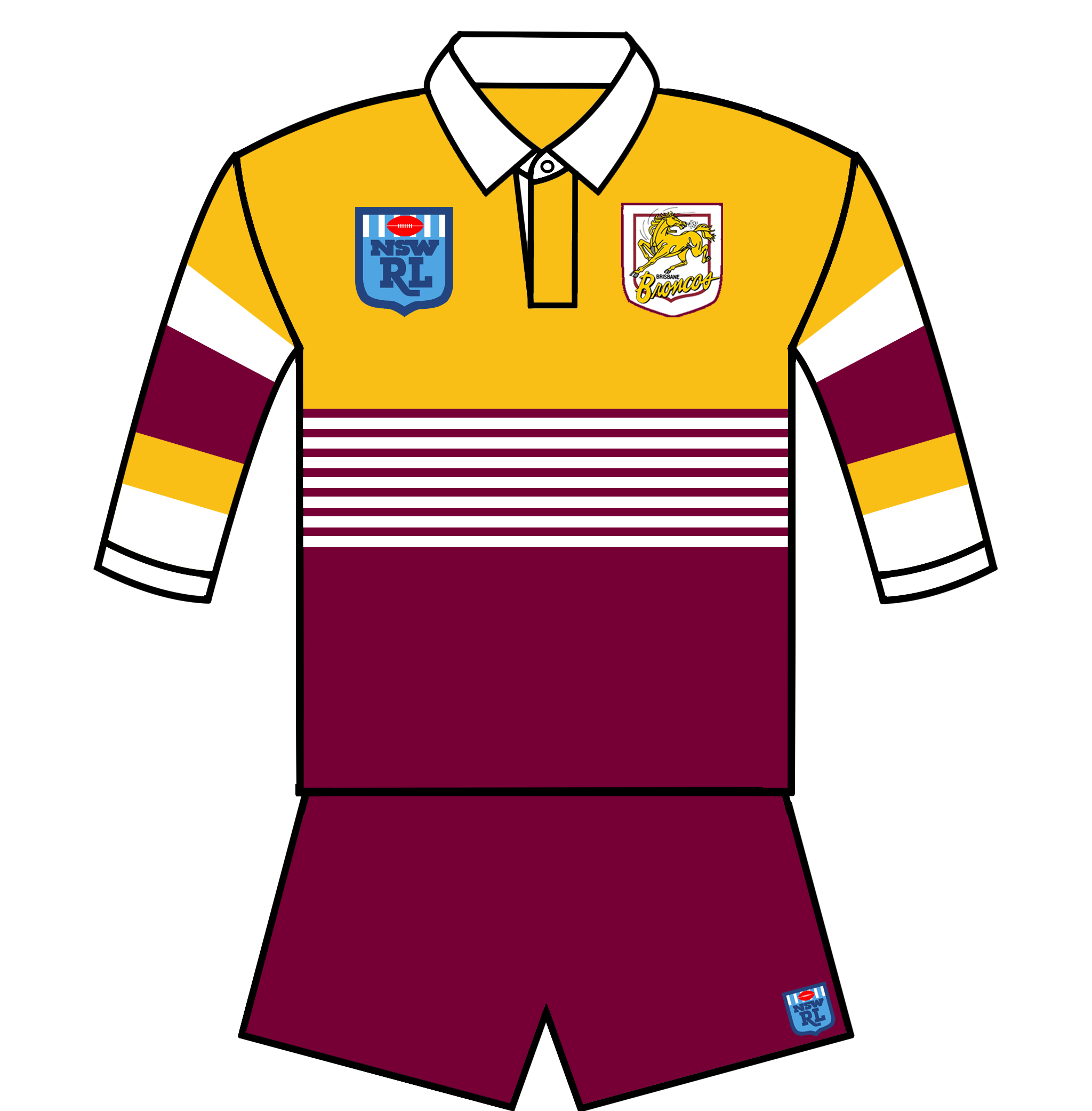
Brisbane; Broncos 1st season Ground: Lang Park; Coach: Wayne Bennett; Captain: Wally Lewis

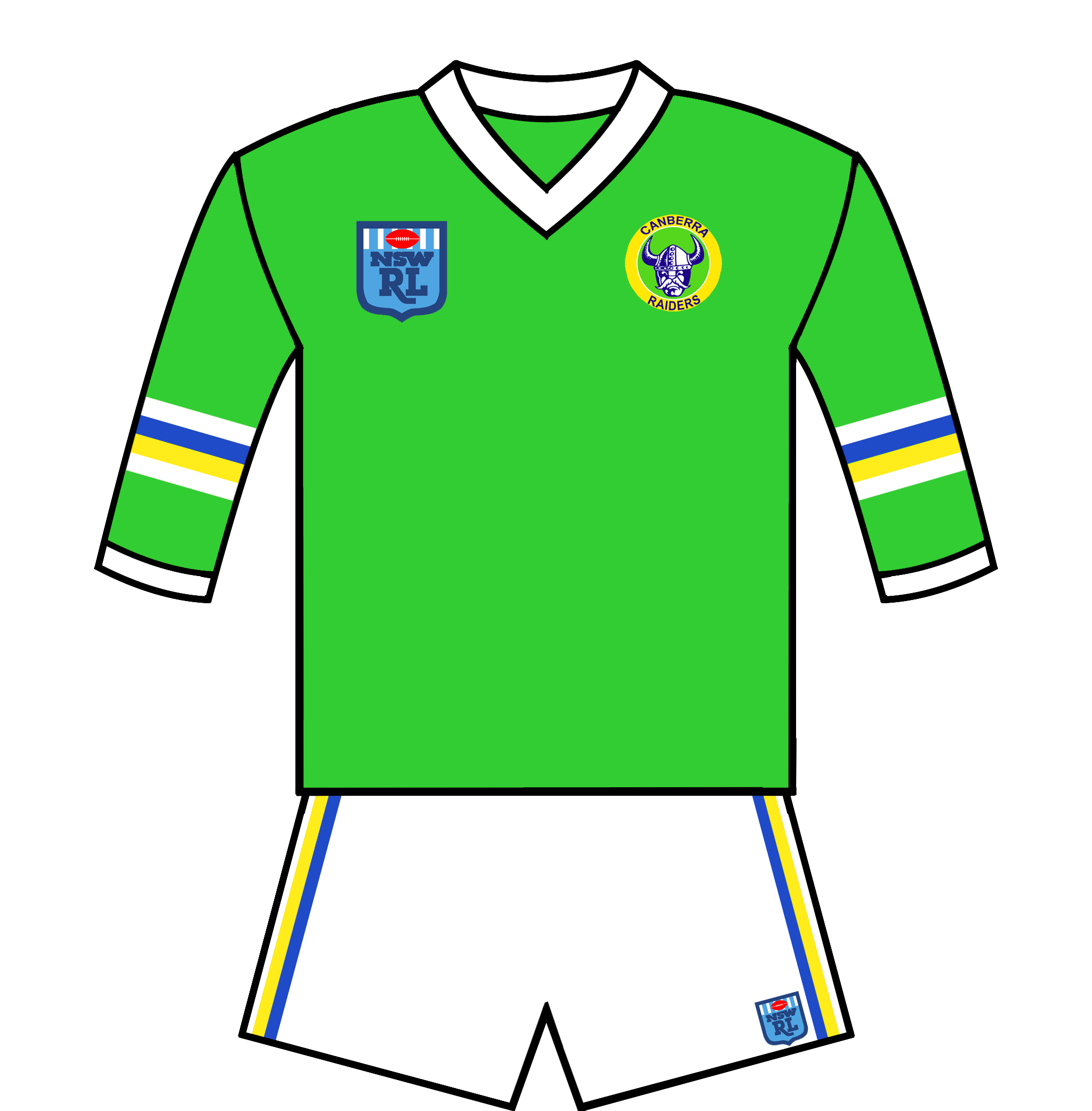
Canberra; Raiders 7th season Ground: Seiffert Oval; Coach: Tim Sheens; Captain: Dean Lance

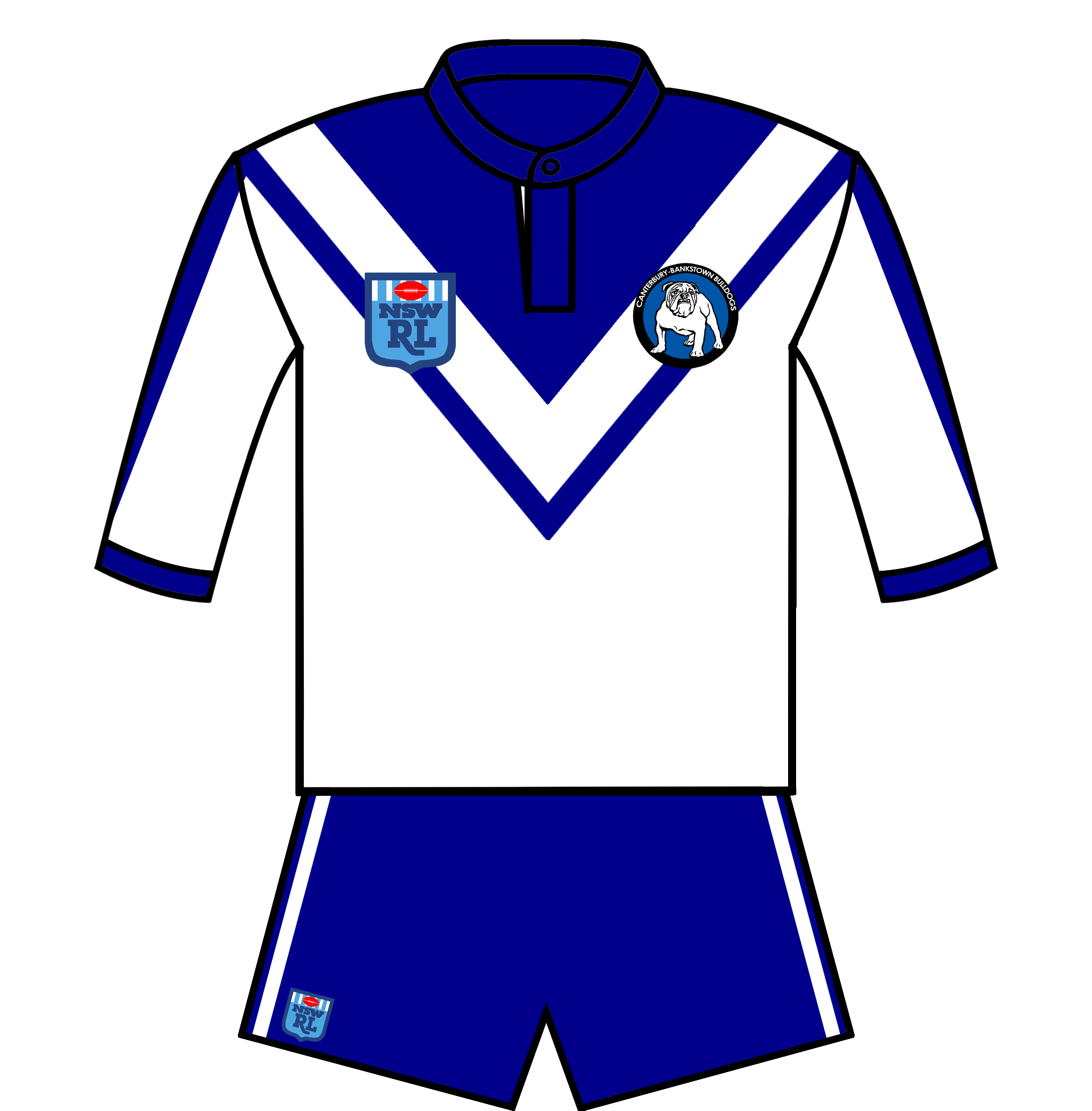
Canterbury-Bankstown; Bulldogs 54th season Ground: Belmore Oval; Coach: Phil Gould; Captain: Peter Tunks

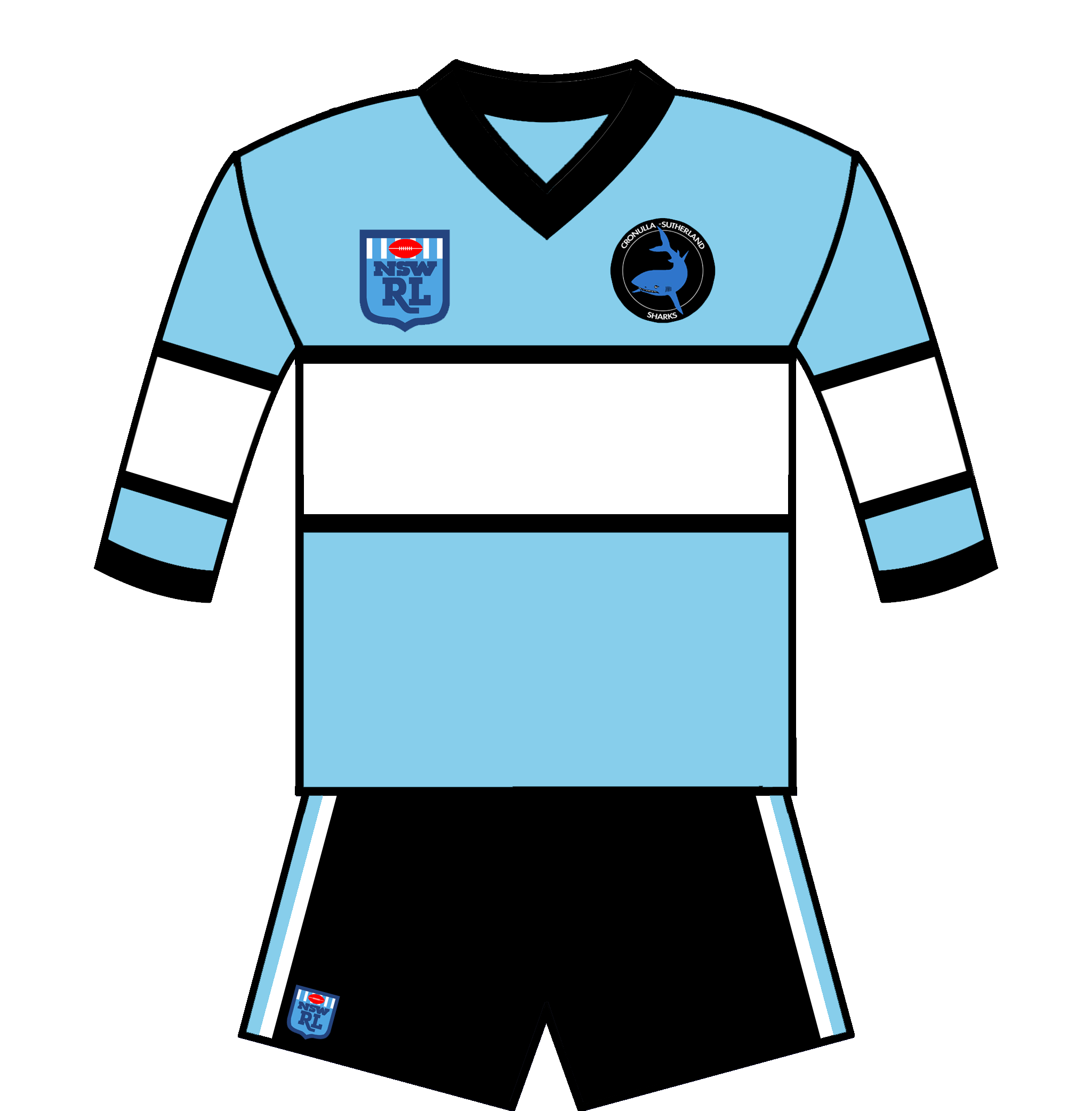
Cronulla-Sutherland; Sharks 22nd season Ground: Caltex Field; Coach: Allan Fitzgibbon; Captain: David Hatch

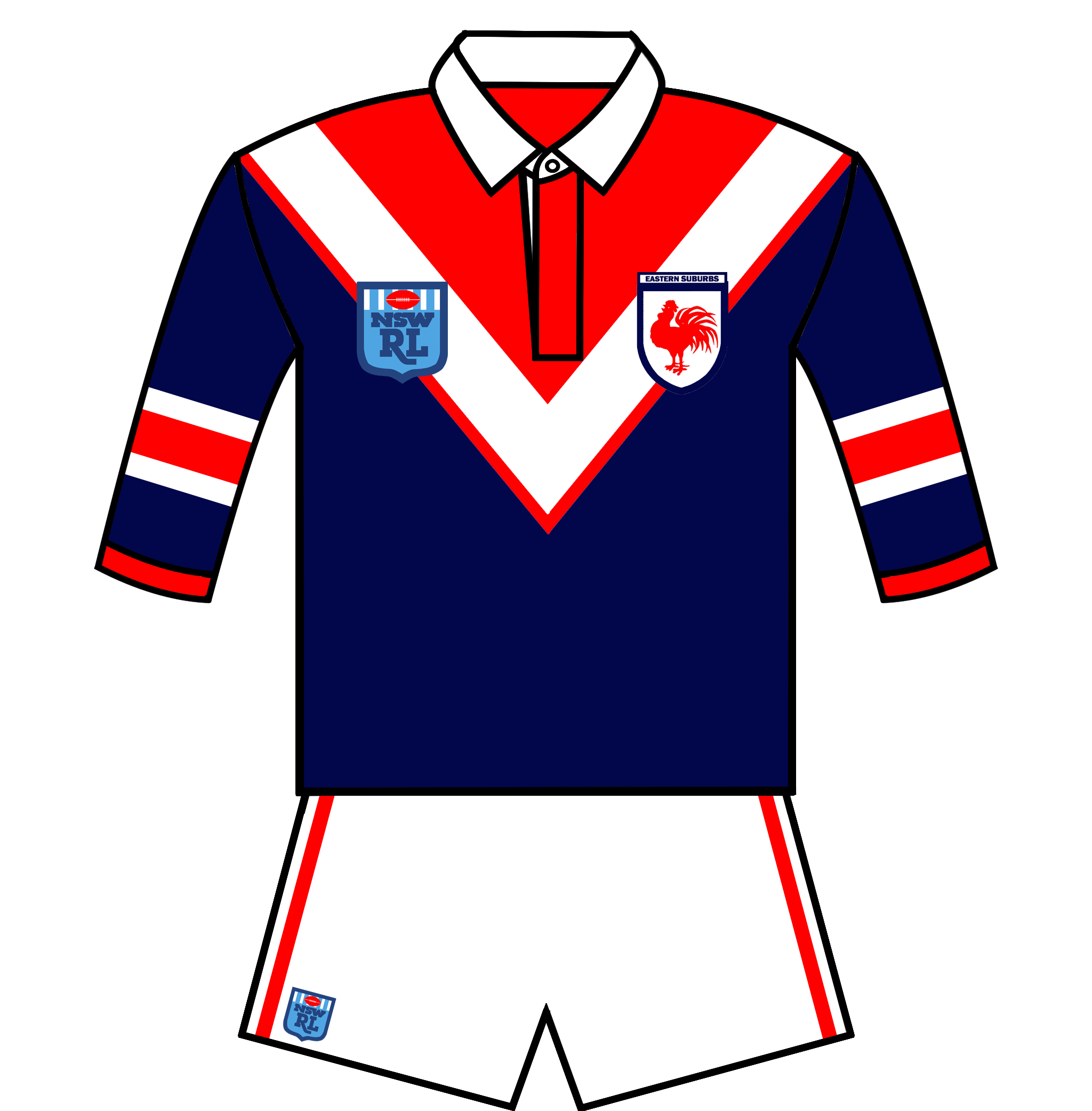
Eastern Suburbs; Roosters 81st season Ground: Sydney Football Stadium; Coach: Arthur Beetson; Captain: Hugh McGahan

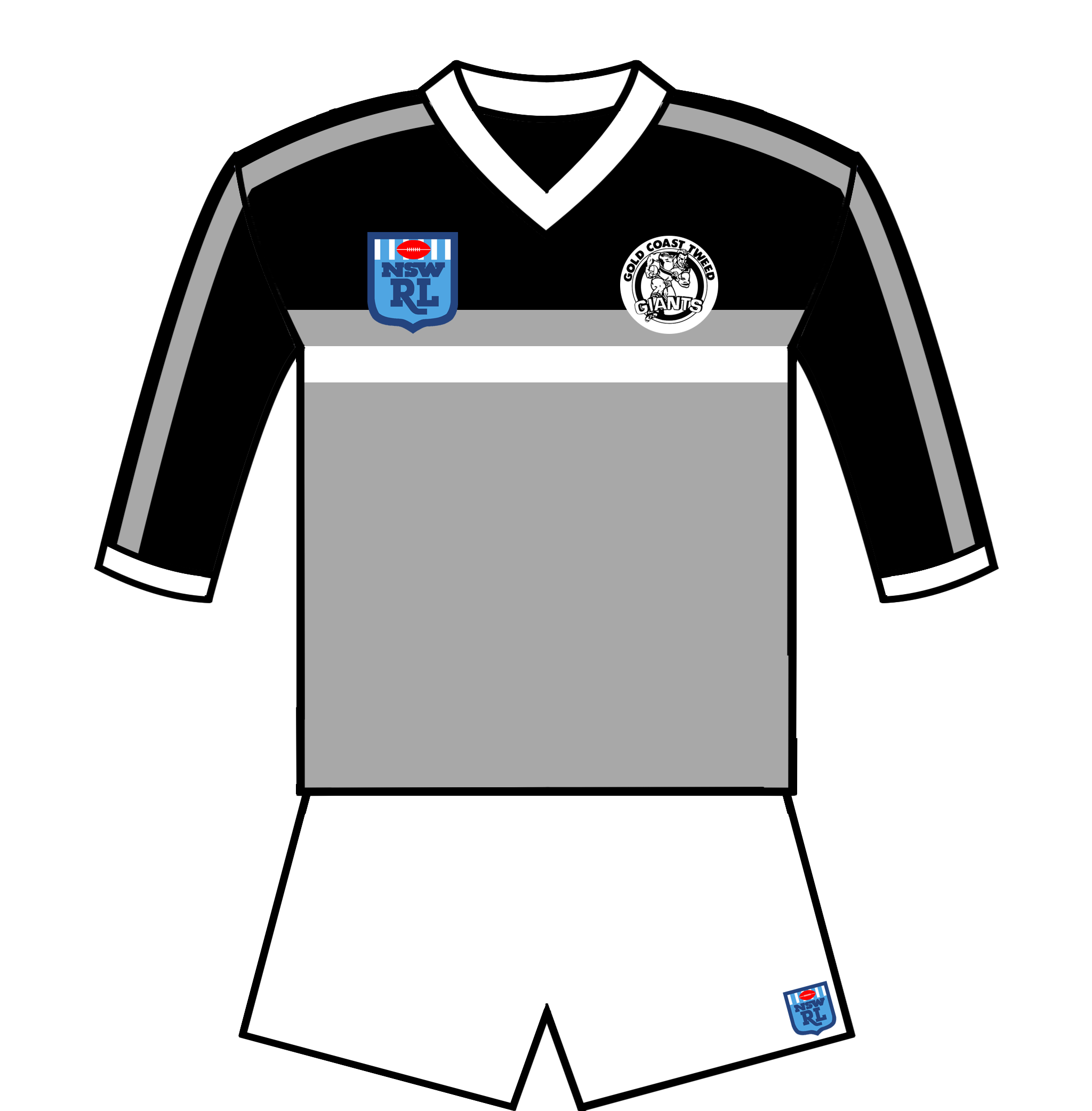
Gold Coast-Tweed; Giants 1st season Ground: Seagulls Stadium; Coach: Bob McCarthy; Captain: Billy Johnstone

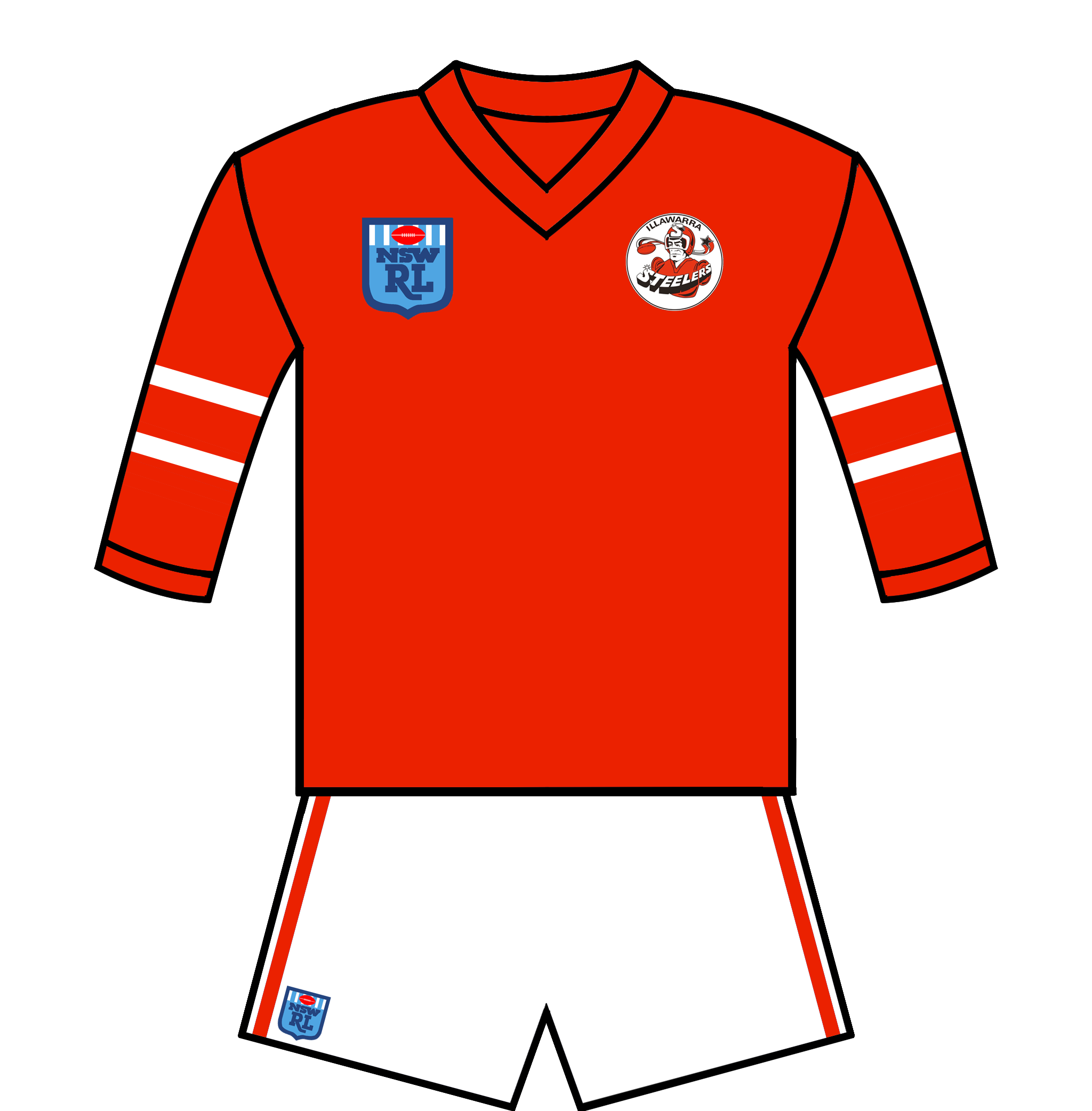
Illawarra; Steelers 7th season Ground: Wollongong Stadium; Coach: Terry Fearnley; Captain: Perry Haddock → Paul Upfield

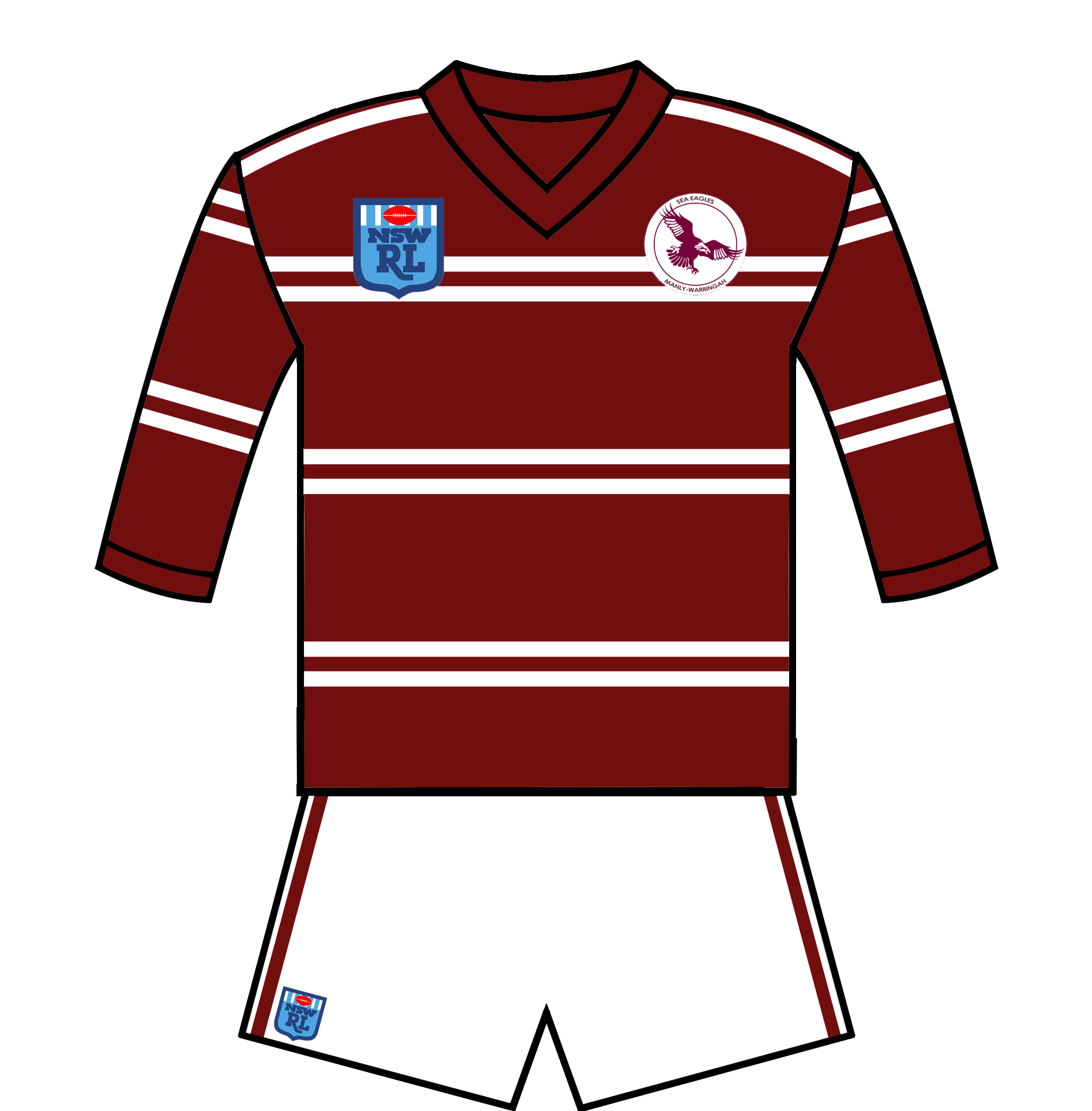
Manly-Warringah; Sea Eagles 42nd season Ground: Brookvale Oval; Coach: Bob Fulton; Captain: Paul Vautin

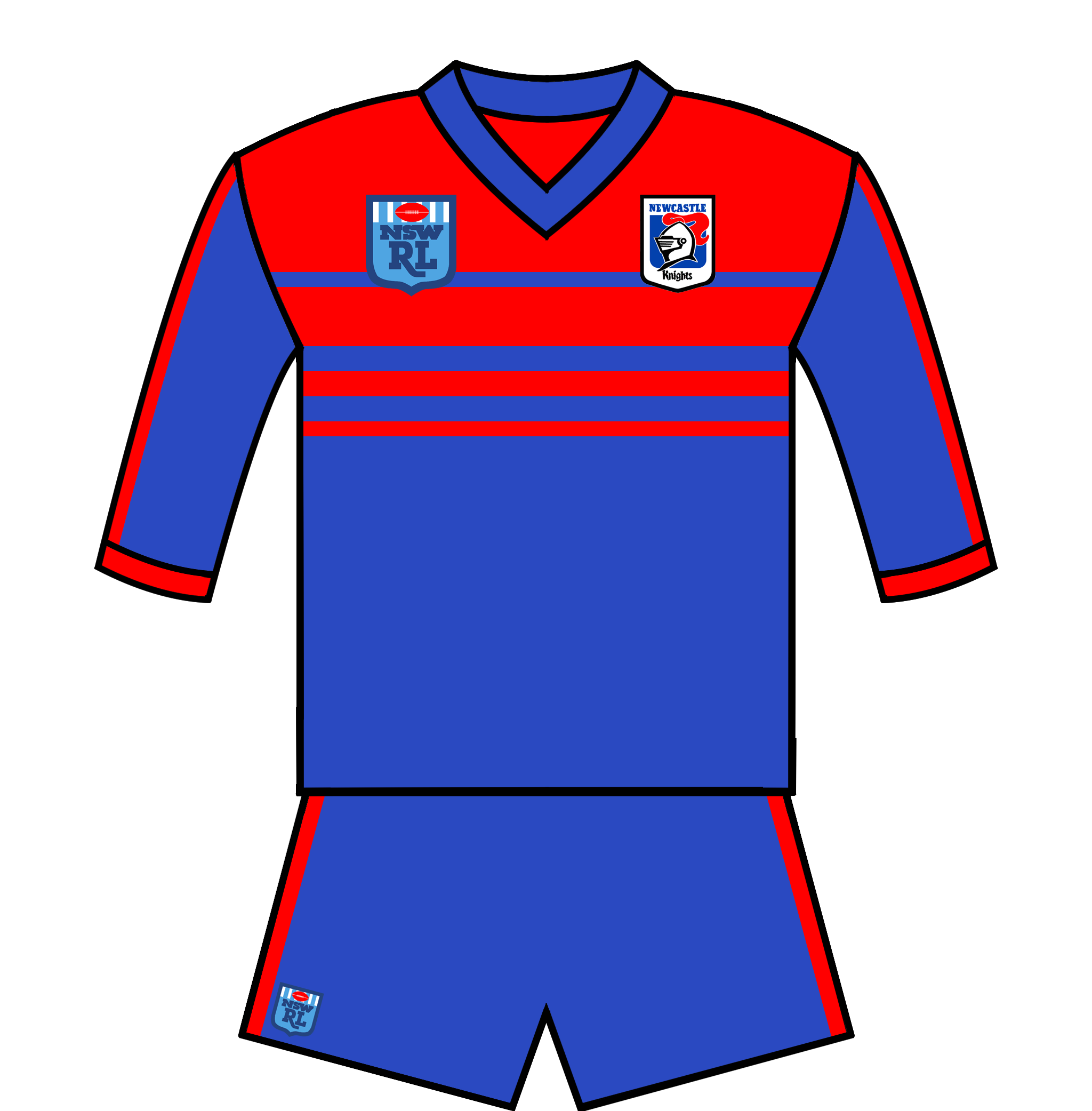
Newcastle; Knights 1st season Ground: Newcastle ISC; Coach: Allan McMahon; Captain: Sam Stewart

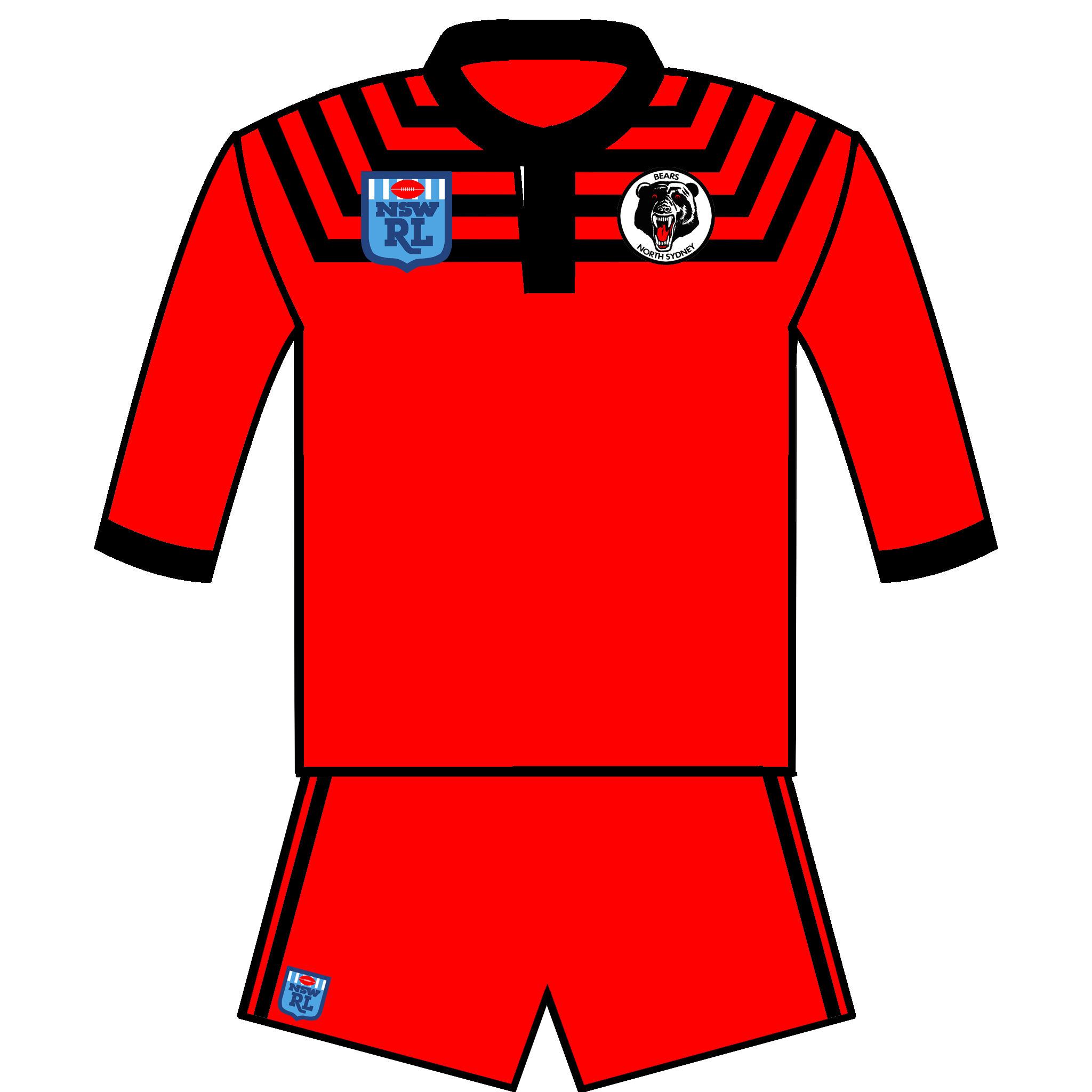
North Sydney; Bears 81st season Ground: North Sydney Oval; Coach: Frank Stanton; Captain: Mark Graham

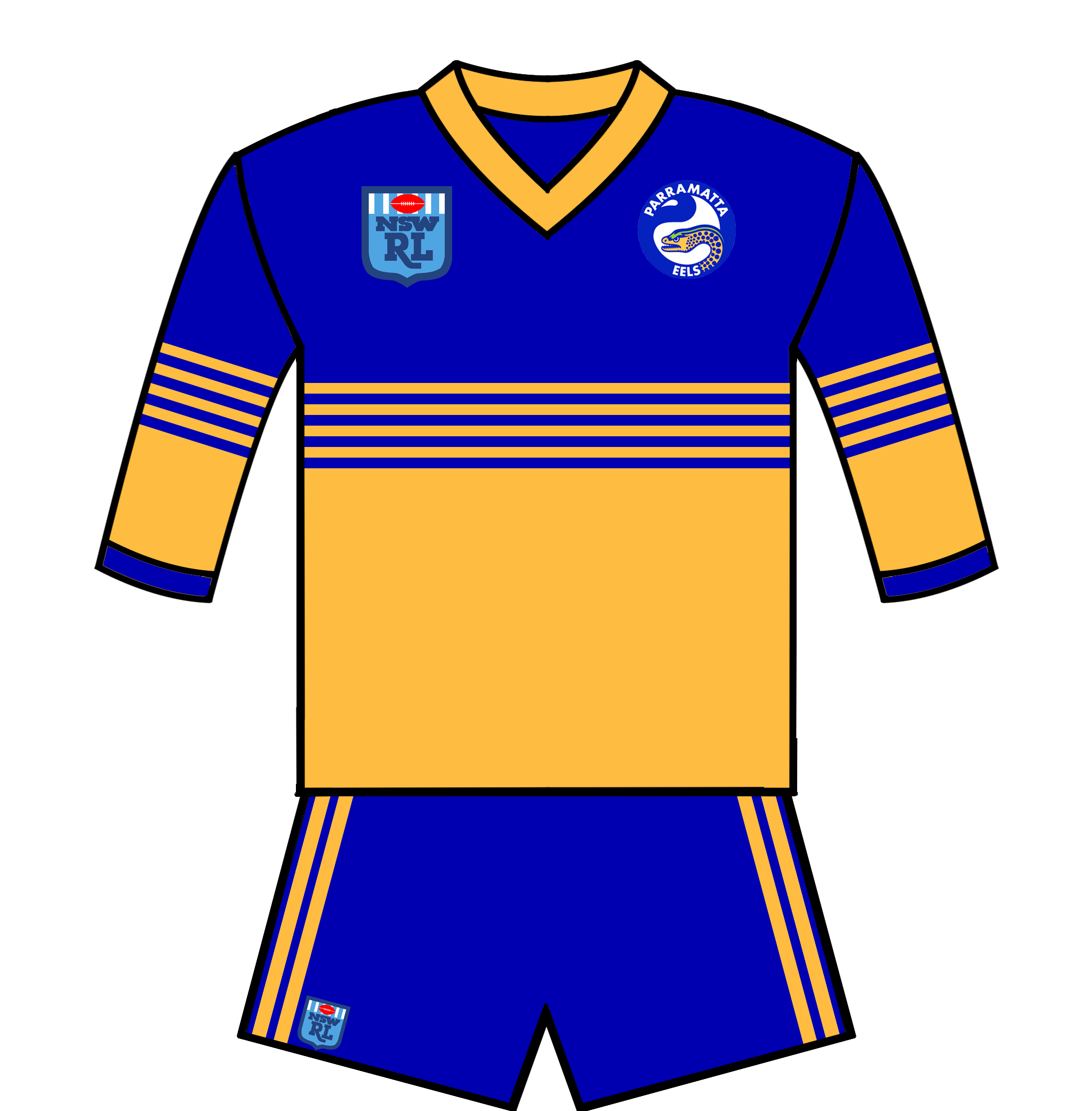
Parramatta; Eels 42nd season Ground: Parramatta Stadium; Coach: John Monie; Captain: Peter Sterling

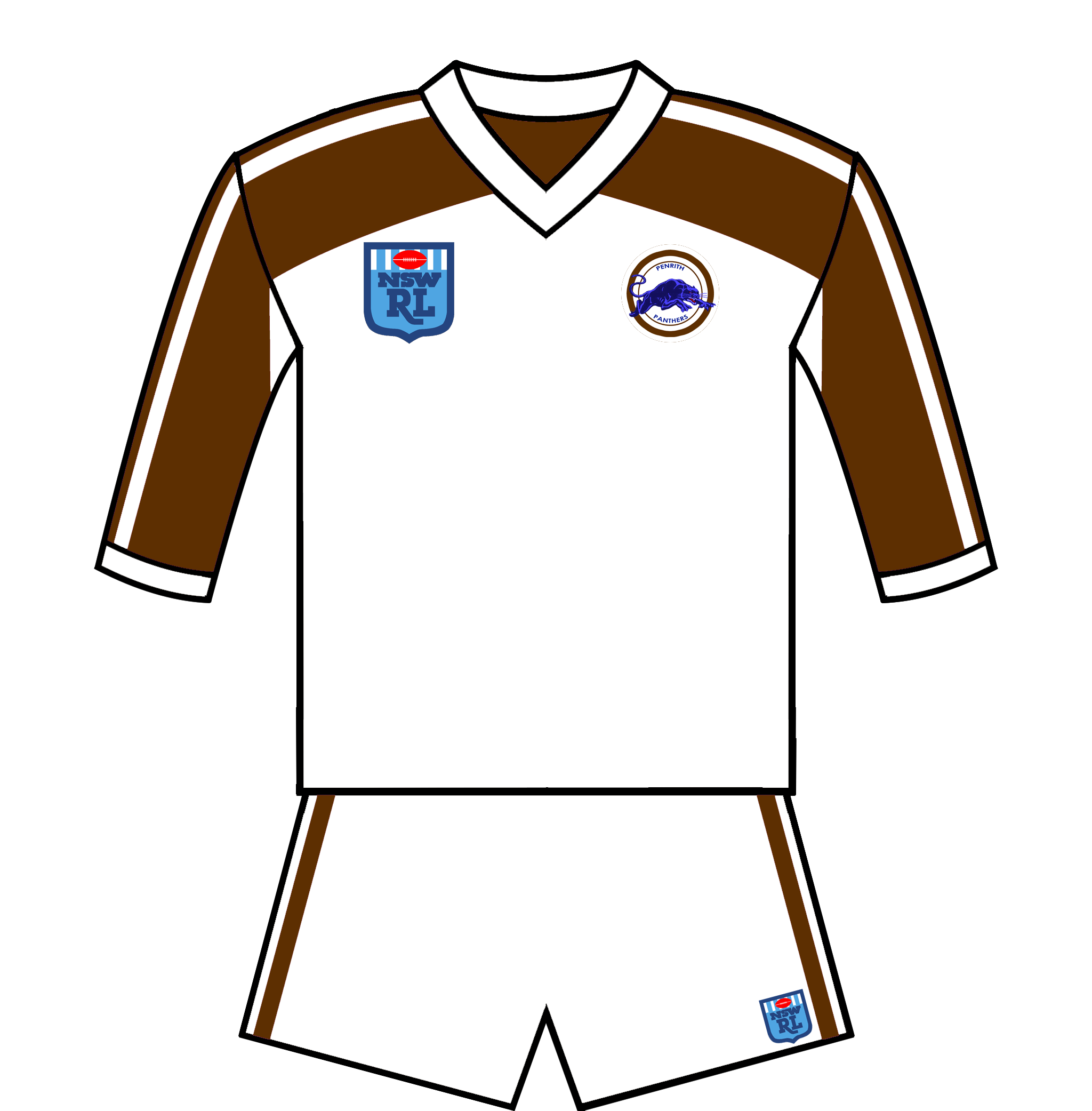
Penrith; Panthers 22nd season Ground: Penrith Stadium; Coach: Ron Willey; Captain: Royce Simmons

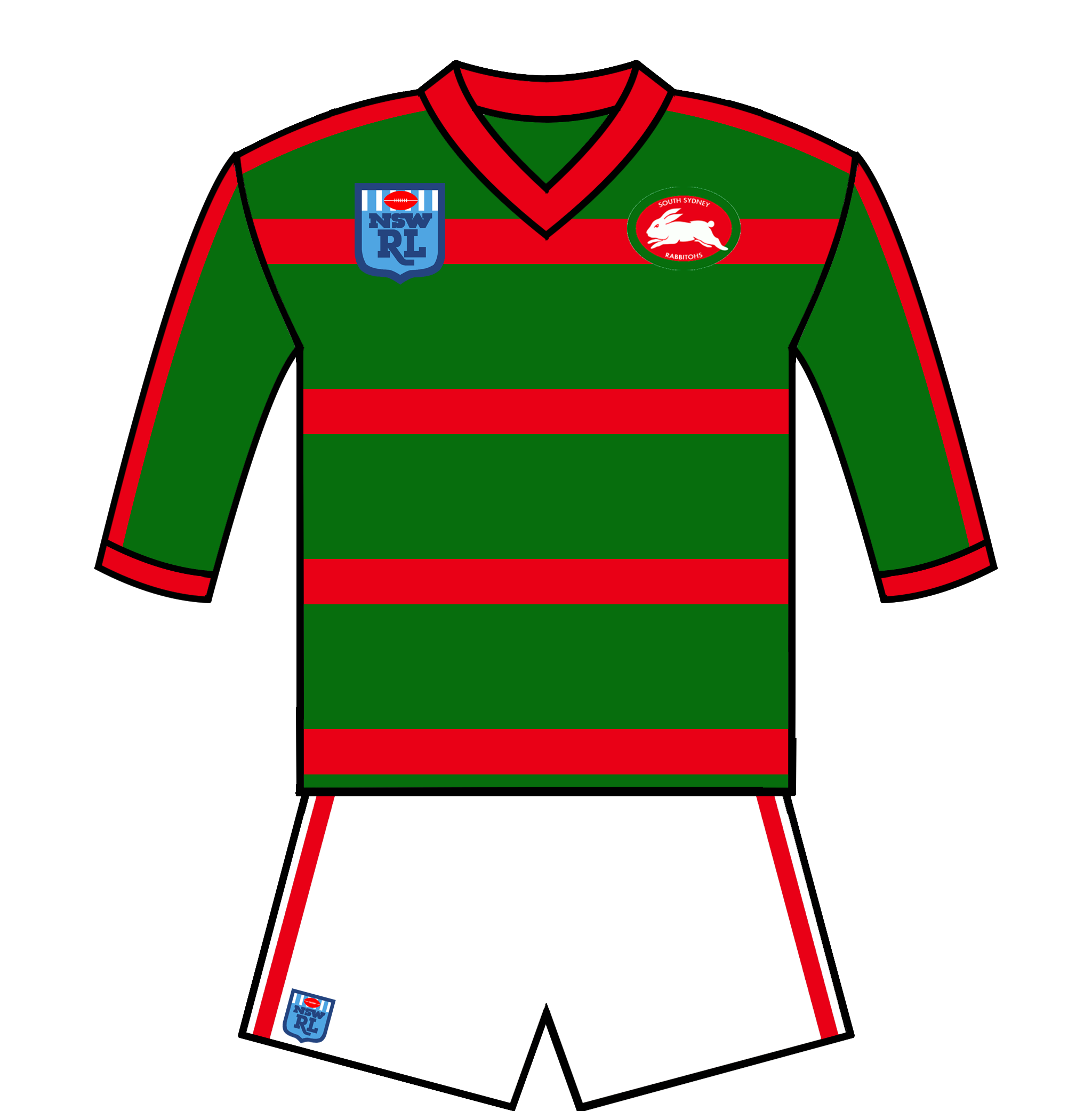
South Sydney; Rabbitohs 81st season Ground: Sydney Football Stadium; Coach: George Piggins; Captain: Mario Fenech

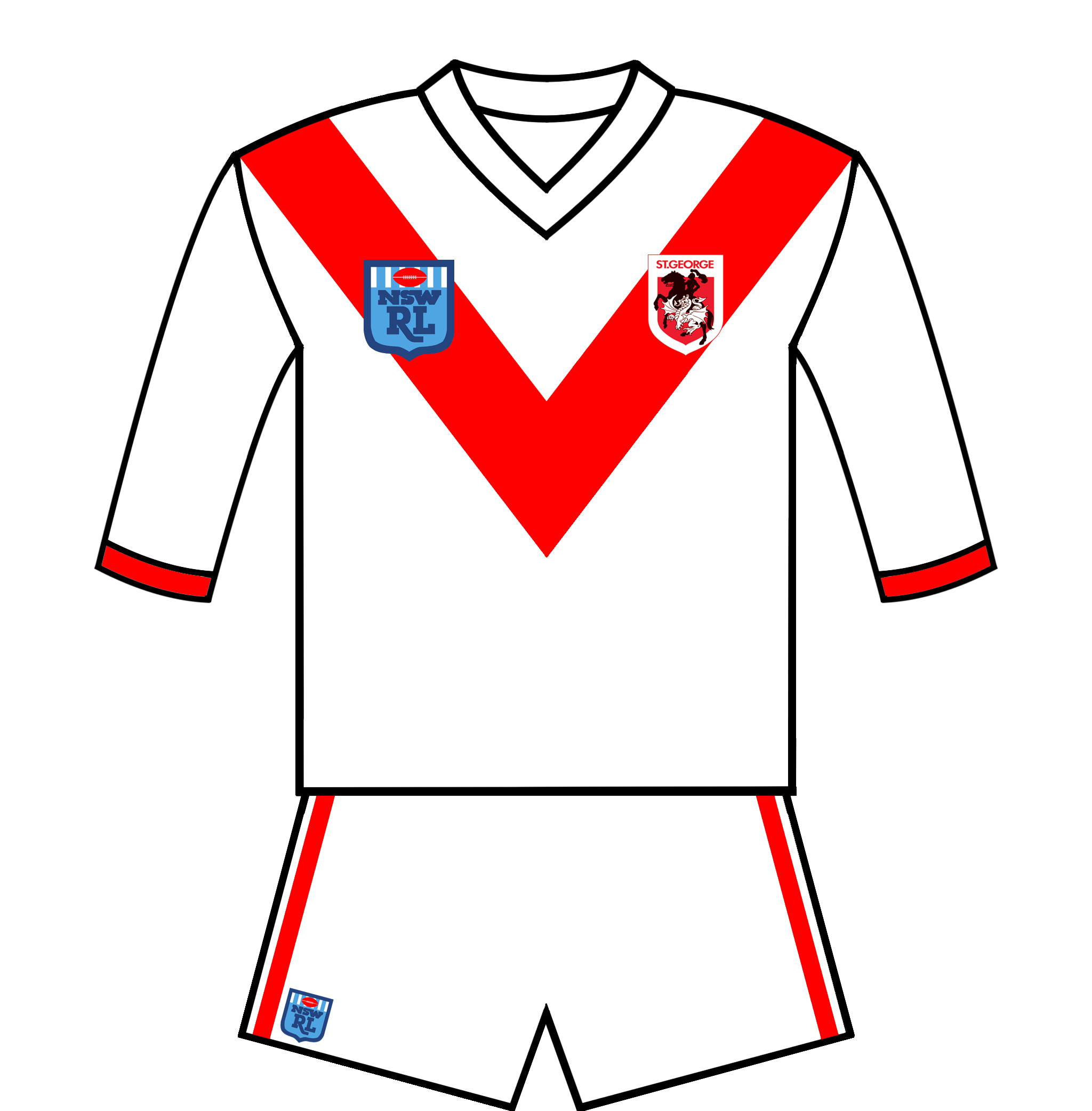
St. George; Dragons 68th season Ground: Belmore Sports Ground; Coach: Ted Glossop; Captain: Craig Young

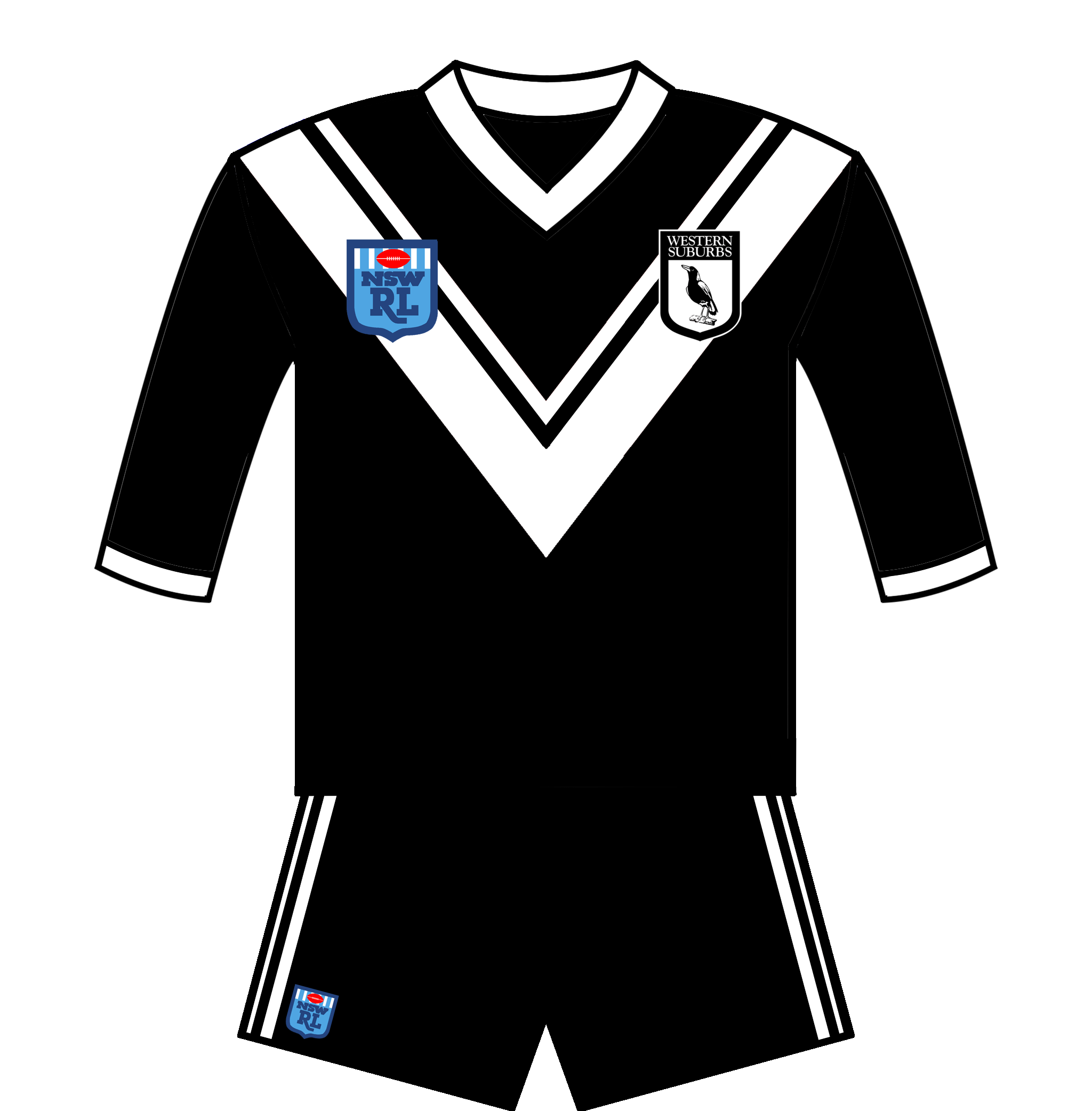
Western Suburbs; Magpies 81st season Ground: Orana Park; Coach: Laurie Freier → John Bailey; Captain: Ian Schubert

=== Advertising ===
1988 saw the NSWRL move their advertising account from John Singleton Advertising to Hertz Walpole Advertising. There was initially however no shift in the prior campaign direction. For the second year running a visual and vocal performance by Australian rock journeyman John "Swanee" Swan was used. Swanee recorded a purpose-written jingle entitled "The Greatest Game of All" and a rock-clip style ad was shot on a stage setting with smoke, lights and fireworks. The performance footage was interspersed with game action.

Five years later Swan's younger brother Jimmy Barnes would also feature in an NSWRL season advertisement performing alongside Tina Turner.

== Regular season ==
Team	1	2	3	4	5	6	7	8	9	10	11	12	13	14	15	16	17	18	19	20	21	22	F1	F2	F3	F4	GF
Balmain Tigers	**NOR** **+20**	PAR −20	NEW −4	**WES** **+3**	**MAN** **+2**	PEN −10	BRI +8	**STG** **+8**	SOU −9	**CBY** **+11**	CRO −2	**EAS** **+10**	GCG +14	**CAN** **−24**	ILA +12	NOR +10	**PAR** **+16**	**NEW** **+2**	WES +6	MAN −4	**PEN** **+2**	**BRI** **+10**	PEN +20	MAN +13	**CAN** **+8**	CRO +7	CBY −12
Brisbane Broncos	**MAN** **+34**	**PEN** **+2**	WES +34	NOR +12	**PAR** **+6**	NEW +14	**BAL** **−8**	CRO −30	**EAS** **+4**	GCG −3	**CAN** **−20**	ILA +22	**STG** **+4**	SOU −12	**CBY** **−15**	MAN +18	PEN +2	**WES** **+26**	**NOR** **+18**	PAR −8	**NEW** **+16**	BAL −10					
Canberra Raiders	**ILA** **+20**	STG +24	**SOU** **+28**	CBY −5	**CRO** **+18**	EAS +36	**GCG** **+44**	PAR −28	WES +14	**NOR** **−8**	BRI +20	**PEN** **−6**	**MAN** **−6**	BAL +24	**NEW** **+18**	ILA +9	**STG** **+16**	SOU +33	**CBY** **−7**	CRO −22	**EAS** **+8**	GCG +20	X	CBY −1	BAL −8		
Canterbury-Bankstown Bulldogs	GCG +11	**CRO** **+4**	EAS +4	**CAN** **+5**	ILA −6	**STG** **+14**	SOU +4	**PEN** **+6**	**MAN** **−18**	BAL −11	**NEW** **+18**	PAR +28	WES +25	**NOR** **−12**	BRI +15	**GCG** **+15**	CRO −8	**EAS** **+15**	CAN +7	**ILA** **+6**	**STG** **+26**	**SOU** **−4**	X	**CAN** **+1**	CRO +18	X	**BAL** **+12**
Cronulla-Sutherland Sharks	**SOU** **−1**	CBY −4	GCG +1	**EAS**; **0**	CAN −18	**ILA** **+18**	STG +16	**BRI** **+30**	PEN +22	MAN −14	**BAL** **+2**	NEW; 0	**PAR** **+5**	**WES** **+36**	NOR +4	SOU +2	**CBY** **+8**	**GCG** **+20**	EAS +18	**CAN** **+22**	ILA +8	**STG** **+2**	X	X	**CBY** **−18**	**BAL** **−7**	
Eastern Suburbs Roosters	**STG** **−10**	**SOU** **−2**	**CBY** **−4**	CRO; 0	**GCG** **+18**	**CAN** **−36**	ILA −4	**NOR**; **0**	BRI −4	**PEN** **+22**	**MAN** **+4**	BAL −10	**NEW** **+16**	PAR −4	WES; 0	STG +21	**SOU** **−25**	CBY −15	**CRO** **−18**	GCG +24	CAN −8	**ILA** **−21**					
Gold Coast-Tweed Giants	**CBY** **−11**	ILA; 0	**CRO** **−1**	**STG** **−8**	EAS −18	**SOU** **−12**	CAN −44	**WES** **−20**	NOR −4	**BRI** **+3**	PEN −35	MAN −28	**BAL** **−14**	NEW +9	**PAR** **+3**	CBY −15	**ILA** **+15**	CRO −20	STG −2	**EAS** **−24**	SOU; 0	**CAN** **−20**					
Illawarra Steelers	CAN −20	**GCG**; **0**	**STG** **+16**	SOU −13	**CBY** **+6**	CRO −18	**EAS** **+4**	NEW +8	**PAR** **−22**	**WES** **+16**	NOR −29	**BRI** **−22**	PEN −34	MAN −16	**BAL** **−12**	**CAN** **−9**	GCG −15	STG −2	**SOU** **−2**	CBY −6	**CRO** **−8**	EAS +21					
Manly Warringah Sea Eagles	BRI −34	**NOR** **+26**	PAR +52	**NEW** **+32**	BAL −2	**WES** **+20**	**PEN** **−22**	**SOU** **−14**	CBY +18	**CRO** **+14**	EAS −4	**GCG** **+28**	CAN +6	**ILA** **+16**	STG +16	**BRI** **−18**	NOR +4	**PAR** **+30**	NEW +8	**BAL** **+4**	WES −3	PEN +14	X	**BAL** **−13**			
Newcastle Knights	**PAR** **−24**	WES +4	**BAL** **+4**	MAN −32	PEN −6	**BRI** **−14**	NOR −34	**ILA** **−8**	STG −12	**SOU** **+7**	CBY −18	**CRO**; **0**	EAS −16	**GCG** **−9**	CAN −18	PAR +1	**WES** **−10**	BAL −2	**MAN** **−8**	**PEN** **−11**	BRI −16	**NOR** **+32**					
North Sydney Bears	BAL −20	MAN −26	**PEN** **−27**	**BRI** **−12**	WES +7	PAR +4	**NEW** **+34**	EAS; 0	**GCG** **+4**	CAN +8	**ILA** **+29**	STG −8	**SOU**; **0**	CBY +12	**CRO** **−4**	**BAL** **−10**	**MAN** **−4**	PEN −5	BRI −18	**WES** **+4**	**PAR** **+6**	NEW −32					
Parramatta Eels	NEW +24	**BAL** **+20**	**MAN** **−52**	PEN −2	BRI −6	**NOR** **−4**	WES −2	**CAN** **+28**	ILA +22	**STG** **−12**	SOU +8	**CBY** **−28**	CRO −5	**EAS** **+4**	GCG −3	**NEW** **−1**	BAL −16	MAN −30	**PEN** **−4**	**BRI** **+8**	NOR −6	**WES** **+4**					
Penrith Panthers	**WES** **+20**	BRI −2	NOR +27	**PAR** **+2**	**NEW** **+6**	**BAL** **+10**	MAN +22	CBY −6	**CRO** **−22**	EAS −22	**GCG** **+35**	CAN +6	**ILA** **+34**	STG +4	**SOU** **+8**	WES +12	**BRI** **−2**	**NOR** **+5**	PAR +4	NEW +11	BAL −2	**MAN** **−14**	**BAL** **−20**				
South Sydney Rabbitohs	CRO +1	EAS +2	CAN −28	**ILA** **+13**	STG +32	GCG +12	**CBY** **−4**	MAN +14	**BAL** **+9**	NEW −7	**PAR** **−8**	**WES** **+8**	NOR; 0	**BRI** **+12**	PEN −8	**CRO** **−2**	EAS +25	**CAN** **−33**	ILA +2	**STG** **−2**	**GCG**; **0**	CBY +4					
St. George Dragons	EAS +10	**CAN** **−24**	ILA −16	GCG +8	**SOU** **−32**	CBY −14	**CRO** **−16**	BAL −8	**NEW** **+12**	PAR +12	WES +2	**NOR** **+8**	BRI −4	**PEN** **−4**	**MAN** **−16**	**EAS** **−21**	CAN −16	**ILA** **+2**	**GCG** **+2**	SOU +2	CBY −26	CRO −2					
Western Suburbs Magpies	PEN −20	**NEW** **−4**	**BRI** **−34**	BAL −3	**NOR** **−7**	MAN −20	**PAR** **+2**	GCG +20	**CAN** **−14**	ILA −16	**STG** **−2**	SOU −8	**CBY** **−25**	CRO −36	**EAS**; **0**	**PEN** **−12**	NEW +10	BRI −26	**BAL** **−6**	NOR −4	**MAN** **+3**	PAR −4					
Team	1	2	3	4	5	6	7	8	9	10	11	12	13	14	15	16	17	18	19	20	21	22	F1	F2	F3	F4	GF

Bold – Home game
X – Bye
Opponent for round listed above margin

=== Ladder ===
	Team	Pld	W	D	L	PF	PA	PD	Pts
1	Cronulla	22	16	2	4	507	330	+177	34
2	**Canterbury (P)**	22	16	0	6	412	268	+144	32
3	Canberra	22	15	0	7	596	346	+250	30
4	Manly	22	15	0	7	538	347	+191	30
5	Penrith	22	15	0	7	394	258	+136	30
6	Balmain	22	15	0	7	402	341	+61	30
7	Brisbane	22	14	0	8	474	368	+106	28
8	South Sydney	22	12	2	8	425	383	+42	24
9	North Sydney	22	9	2	11	366	424	−58	20
10	St. George	22	9	0	13	352	493	−141	18
11	Parramatta	22	8	0	14	359	412	−53	16
12	Eastern Suburbs	22	6	3	13	387	443	−56	15
13	Illawarra	22	6	1	15	353	510	−157	13
14	Newcastle	22	5	1	16	270	460	−190	11
15	Gold Coast-Tweed	22	4	2	16	238	484	−246	10
16	Western Suburbs	22	4	1	17	287	493	−206	9

- South Sydney were stripped of 2 competition points due to an illegal replacement in one game.

=== Ladder progression ===
- Numbers highlighted in green indicate that the team finished the round inside the top 5.
- Numbers highlighted in blue indicates the team finished first on the ladder in that round.
- Numbers highlighted in red indicates the team finished last place on the ladder in that round.

	Team	1	2	3	4	5	6	7	8	9	10	11	12	13	14	15	16	17	18	19	20	21	22
1	Cronulla-Sutherland Sharks	0	0	2	3	3	5	7	9	11	11	13	14	16	18	20	22	24	26	28	30	32	34
2	Canterbury-Bankstown Bulldogs	2	4	6	8	8	10	12	14	14	14	16	18	20	20	22	24	24	26	28	30	32	32
3	Canberra Raiders	2	4	6	6	8	10	12	12	14	14	16	16	16	18	20	22	24	26	26	26	28	30
4	Manly Warringah Sea Eagles	0	2	4	6	6	8	8	8	10	12	12	14	16	18	20	20	22	24	26	28	28	30
5	Penrith Panthers	2	2	4	6	8	10	12	12	12	12	14	16	18	20	22	24	24	26	28	30	30	30
6	Balmain Tigers	2	2	2	4	6	6	8	10	10	12	12	14	16	16	18	20	22	24	26	26	28	30
7	Brisbane Broncos	2	4	6	8	10	12	12	12	14	14	14	16	18	18	18	20	22	24	26	26	28	28
8	South Sydney Rabbitohs	2	4	4	6	8	10	10	12	12	12	12	14	15	17	17	17	19	19	21	21	22	24
9	North Sydney Bears	0	0	0	0	2	4	6	7	9	11	13	13	14	16	16	16	16	16	16	18	20	20
10	St. George Dragons	2	2	2	4	4	4	4	4	6	8	10	12	12	12	12	12	12	14	16	18	18	18
11	Parramatta Eels	2	4	4	4	4	4	4	6	8	8	10	10	10	12	12	12	12	12	12	14	14	16
12	Eastern Suburbs Roosters	0	0	0	1	3	3	3	4	4	6	8	8	10	10	11	13	13	13	13	15	15	15
13	Illawarra Steelers	0	1	3	3	5	5	7	9	9	11	11	11	11	11	11	11	11	11	11	11	11	13
14	Newcastle Knights	0	2	4	4	4	4	4	4	4	6	6	7	7	7	7	9	9	9	9	9	9	11
15	Gold Coast-Tweed Giants	0	1	1	1	1	1	1	1	1	3	3	3	3	5	7	7	9	9	9	9	10	10
16	Western Suburbs Magpies	0	0	0	0	0	0	2	4	4	4	4	4	4	4	5	5	7	7	7	7	9	9

== Finals ==
Balmain had staged a gripping charge for the final five, winning nine of their last eleven games including five in a row to leave them in equal fifth spot with the Penrith Panthers at the regular season's end. They then won four sudden death finals to make it to the Grand final.

Home	Score	Away	Match Information
Home	Score	Away	Date and Time	Venue	Referee	Crowd
Playoff
Penrith Panthers	8–28	Balmain Tigers	16 August 1988	Parramatta Stadium	Mick Stone	14,206
Qualifying Finals
Manly-Warringah Sea Eagles	6–19	Balmain Tigers	20 August 1988	Sydney Football Stadium	Mick Stone	25,327
Canterbury-Bankstown Bulldogs	19–18	Canberra Raiders	21 August 1988	Sydney Football Stadium	Graham Annesley	19,259
Semi-finals
Canberra Raiders	6–14	Balmain Tigers	27 August 1988	Sydney Football Stadium	Mick Stone	28,879
Cronulla-Sutherland Sharks	8–26	Canterbury-Bankstown Bulldogs	28 August 1988	Sydney Football Stadium	Graham Annesley	31,684
Preliminary final
Cronulla-Sutherland Sharks	2–9	Balmain Tigers	4 September 1988	Sydney Football Stadium	Mick Stone	34,848
Grand final
Canterbury-Bankstown Bulldogs	24–12	Balmain Tigers	11 September 1988	Sydney Football Stadium	Mick Stone	40,000

== Chart ==
Qualifying final
16

Major semi-final
Minor semi-final

Preliminary final

Grand final

=== Grand final ===
Canterbury-Bankstown Bulldogs	Position	Balmain Tigers
1. Jason Alchin	FB	1. Garry Jack
2. Glen Nissen	WG	2. Russell Gartner
3. Tony Currie	CE	3. Ellery Hanley
4. Andrew Farrar	CE	4. Michael Pobjie
5. Robin Thorne	WG	5. Ross Conlon
6. Terry Lamb	FE	6. Mick Neil
7. Michael Hagan	HB	7. Gary Freeman
13. Paul Dunn	PR	13. Bruce McGuire
12. Joe Thomas	HK	12. Benny Elias
11. Peter Tunks (c)	PR	11. Kerry Hemsley
10. David Gillespie	SR	10. Paul Sironen
9. Steve Folkes	SR	9. David Brooks
8. Paul Langmack	LK	8. Wayne Pearce (c)
14. Mark Bugden	Bench	14. Scott Gale
15. Brandon Lee	Bench	18. Kevin Hardwick
18. Steve Mortimer	Bench	19. Steve Edmed
23. Darren McCarthy	Bench	
Phil Gould	Coach	Warren Ryan

This was the first grand final not to be played at the Sydney Cricket Ground. Following Balmain's extraordinary late season run in winning thirteen of fifteen games, the stage was set for a grand final of great appeal. 1980s master coach Warren Ryan of Balmain was up against the club he had coached for four years to three grand finals and two premierships, as well as being matched against the man who had replaced him at Canterbury – Phil Gould. It was master against pupil. At just 30 years of age, Gould was vying not only to become the youngest coach to win a grand final but the first since Balmain's Leo Nosworthy in 1969 to steer a team to premiership victory in his first season coaching the top-grade.

The Canterbury-Bankstown Bulldogs faced the Balmain Tigers on 11 September 1988 in the first grand final played at the Sydney Football Stadium and the last game for Steve Mortimer. The match was played early so that Channel Ten could broadcast the 1988 Seoul Olympics. The Australian national anthem was performed by Glenn Shorrock.

After five minutes Peter Tunks was sent to the sin bin for ten minutes for treading on Ben Elias. The first points of the match were scored shortly after from Terry Lamb's successful penalty kick. Another penalty kick from Lamb put the Bulldogs in front 4 nil. However Balmain grabbed the first try an Elias put up a bomb and was first to the ball ahead of Bulldog Jason Alchin. Conlon's conversion from in front gave the Tigers the lead for first time at 6–4.

A highly controversial tackle by Terry Lamb put Balmain's in form British import Ellery Hanley out of the game before the 30-minute mark had been reached. Hanley staggered off, heavily concussed, with the score at 6–4. Under the rules of the time, Hanley was allowed 10 minutes to recover in the head bin. If he could not return he would need to be replaced. He returned just before half-time and stood, out-of-sorts, on the wing. The Bulldogs then ran in a 70-metre try from broken play and went to the break with a lead of 10–8.

Hanley did not return after half-time and the Bulldogs started to dominate. A great Canterbury team try to Michael Hagan sealed the match. Bruce McGuire scored Balmain's second try late in the match although the outcome was already clear. The match ended on a sentimental note when Gould called the Bulldogs' representative star, former captain and 271-game veteran, Steve Mortimer to the sideline. He was less than fully fit and had his arm heavily padded to protect the wrist he had broken early in the season. However Mortimer had been named as a fresh reserve as tribute to his previous club contributions and the match ended with him moving to dummy half and taking the ball up for the last time.

Canterbury-Bankstown Bulldogs 24
Tries: Nissen, Hagan, Gillespie, Lamb
Goals: Lamb 4

Balmain Tigers 12
Tries: Elias, McGuire
Goals: Conlon 2

Clive Churchill Medal: Paul Dunn (Canterbury)

== Player statistics ==
The following statistics are as of the conclusion of Round 22.

Top 5 point scorers

Points	Player	Tries	Goals	Field goals
210	Gary Belcher	10	85	0
196	Michael O'Connor	17	64	0
164	Ricky Walford	15	52	0
161	Alan Wilson	7	66	1
155	David Smith	7	63	1

Top 5 try scorers

Tries	Player
19	John Ferguson
17	Andrew Ettingshausen
17	Michael O'Connor
15	Wally Lewis
15	Ricky Walford

Top 5 goal scorers

Goals	Player
85	Gary Belcher
66	Alan Wilson
66	Mark Ellison
64	Michael O'Connor
64	Ross Conlon

== 1988 Transfers ==
=== Players ===
Player	1987 Club	1988 Club
Gavin Hanrahan	Balmain Tigers	Newcastle Knights
Phil Sigsworth	Balmain Tigers	Retirement
Terry Fahey	Canberra Raiders	Retirement
Jay Hoffman	Canberra Raiders	Retirement
Terry Regan	Canberra Raiders	Hull F.C.
David Boyd	Canterbury-Bankstown Bulldogs	Newcastle Knights
Glen Frendo	Canterbury-Bankstown Bulldogs	Newcastle Knights
Pat Jarvis	Canterbury-Bankstown Bulldogs	Eastern Suburbs Roosters
Peter Kelly	Canterbury-Bankstown Bulldogs	Penrith Panthers
Chris Mortimer	Canterbury-Bankstown Bulldogs	Penrith Panthers
Peter Mortimer	Canterbury-Bankstown Bulldogs	Hull Kingston Rovers
Phil Hurst	Cronulla-Sutherland Sharks	Canberra Raiders
Jim Leis	Cronulla-Sutherland Sharks	Retirement
Brian Battese	Eastern Suburbs Roosters	Canberra Raiders
Kevin Hastings	Eastern Suburbs Roosters	Retirement
Glen Leggett	Eastern Suburbs Roosters	Illawarra Steelers
Terry Matterson	Eastern Suburbs Roosters	Brisbane Broncos
Gary Prohm	Eastern Suburbs Roosters	Retirement
Tony Rampling	Eastern Suburbs Roosters	Gold Coast-Tweed Giants
Robert Simpkins	Eastern Suburbs Roosters	Gold Coast-Tweed Giants
Brad Tessmann	Eastern Suburbs Roosters	Brisbane Broncos
John Tobin	Eastern Suburbs Roosters	Retirement
Graeme Bradley	Illawarra Steelers	Penrith Panthers
Chris Close	Manly Warringah Sea Eagles	Gold Coast-Tweed Giants
Mitchell Cox	Manly Warringah Sea Eagles	Retirement
Ron Gibbs	Manly Warringah Sea Eagles	Gold Coast-Tweed Giants
Marty Gurr	Manly Warringah Sea Eagles	Leeds
Martin Meredith	Manly Warringah Sea Eagles	Halifax
Simon Brockwell	North Sydney Bears	Retirement
Olsen Filipaina	North Sydney Bears	Retirement
Paul McCaffery	North Sydney Bears	Hull F.C.
Don McKinnon	North Sydney Bears	Manly Warringah Sea Eagles
Graeme Atkins	Parramatta Eels	Retirement
Michael Eden	Parramatta Eels	Gold Coast-Tweed Giants
Ernie Garland	Parramatta Eels	Western Suburbs Magpies
Neil Hunt	Parramatta Eels	Gold Coast-Tweed Giants
Stan Jurd	Parramatta Eels	Retirement
Ken Wolffe	Parramatta Eels	Retirement
Darryl Brohman	Penrith Panthers	Retirement
Tony Butterfield	Penrith Panthers	Newcastle Knights
Warren Fenton	Penrith Panthers	Retirement
Ben Gonzales	Penrith Panthers	Gold Coast-Tweed Giants
Chris Houghton	Penrith Panthers	Canberra Raiders
Craig Izzard	Penrith Panthers	Parramatta Eels
Brandon Lee	Penrith Panthers	Canterbury-Bankstown Bulldogs
David Liddiard	Penrith Panthers	Parramatta Eels
Glenn Miller	Penrith Panthers	Newcastle Knights
Mark Robinson	Penrith Panthers	Parramatta Eels
Joe Vitanza	Penrith Panthers	Gold Coast-Tweed Giants
Neil Baker	South Sydney Rabbitohs	Penrith Panthers
Michael Pobjie	South Sydney Rabbitohs	Balmain Tigers
Mark Ross	South Sydney Rabbitohs	Gold Coast-Tweed Giants
Glenn Burgess	St. George Dragons	Gold Coast-Tweed Giants
Bronko Djura	St. George Dragons	South Sydney Rabbitohs
John Fifita	St. George Dragons	Castleford
Marc Glanville	St. George Dragons	Newcastle Knights
Chris Johns	St. George Dragons	Brisbane Broncos
Billy Johnstone	St. George Dragons	Gold Coast-Tweed Giants
Billy Noke	St. George Dragons	Brisbane Broncos
Brian Quinton	St. George Dragons	Newcastle Knights
Tony Townsend	St. George Dragons	Newcastle Knights
John Bilbija	Western Suburbs Magpies	South Sydney Rabbitohs
Brett Clark	Western Suburbs Magpies	St. George Dragons
John Elias	Western Suburbs Magpies	Eastern Suburbs Roosters
Craig Ellis	Western Suburbs Magpies	Retirement
Paul Sheahan	Western Suburbs Magpies	Gold Coast-Tweed Giants
Gary Webster	Western Suburbs Magpies	Retirement
Les White	Western Suburbs Magpies	South Sydney Rabbitohs
Grant Rix	Fortitude Valley Diehards (BRL)	Brisbane Broncos
Allan Langer	Ipswich Jets (BRL)	Brisbane Broncos
Kerrod Walters	Ipswich Jets (BRL)	Brisbane Broncos
Geoff Bagnall	Norths Devils (BRL)	Gold Coast-Tweed Giants
Greg Dowling	Norths Devils (BRL)	Brisbane Broncos
Trevor Bailey	Past Brothers (BRL)	St. George Dragons
Peter Gill	Past Brothers (BRL)	St. George Dragons
Joe Kilroy	Past Brothers (BRL)	Brisbane Broncos
Clinton Mohr	Past Brothers (BRL)	St. George Dragons
Gary Smith	Past Brothers (BRL)	North Sydney Bears
Greg Conescu	Redcliffe Dolphins (BRL)	Brisbane Broncos
Jeff Doyle	Redcliffe Dolphins (BRL)	Newcastle Knights
Bryan Niebling	Redcliffe Dolphins (BRL)	Brisbane Broncos
Wally Lewis	Wynnum Manly Seagulls (BRL)	Brisbane Broncos
Gene Miles	Wynnum Manly Seagulls (BRL)	Brisbane Broncos
Colin Scott	Wynnum Manly Seagulls (BRL)	Brisbane Broncos
Brett Atkins	Castleford	Parramatta Eels
Neil James	Halifax	Gold Coast-Tweed Giants
Kerry Boustead	Hull Kingston Rovers	North Sydney Bears
Mark Hohn	Hunslet	Brisbane Broncos
Peter Smith	Leeds	Gold Coast-Tweed Giants
Gary Bridge	Oldham	Eastern Suburbs Roosters
Steve Halliwell	Wakefield Trinity	Gold Coast-Tweed Giants
Paul Bishop	Warrington	Cronulla-Sutherland Sharks
Joe Ropati	Warrington	Manly Warringah Sea Eagles
Ellery Hanley	Wigan	Balmain Tigers
Adrian Shelford	Wigan	Newcastle Knights
Tony Kemp	Doncaster	Newcastle Knights

=== Coaches ===
Coach	1987 Club	1988 Club
Wayne Bennett	Canberra Raiders	Brisbane Broncos
Warren Ryan	Canterbury-Bankstown Bulldogs	Balmain Tigers
Tim Sheens	Penrith Panthers	Canberra Raiders

== Great Britain Lions Tour ==
The 1988 Great Britain Lions tour of Australasia was a tour by the Great Britain national rugby league team, nicknamed the 'Lions', of Papua New Guinea, Australia and New Zealand which took place between May and July of 1988. The tour undertaken by the Great Britain team included a test match against Papua New Guinea, a three-test series against Australia for The Ashes, and a single test against New Zealand, all interspersed with matches against local club and representative teams.

The British team was coached by two-time premiership winner with Manly-Warringah, Mal Reilly, who had toured as a player in 1970. The team captain was Ellery Hanley who was making his second Lions tour as a player.

Taking place following the conclusion of England's 1987–88 Rugby Football League season and during Australia's 1988 Winfield Cup premiership season, the tour led to friction between the Great Britain team's management and the Australian Rugby League over match scheduling and promotion. The Lions finished the tour with ten wins and six losses. Unfortunately for the Lions, three of their losses came in the Test matches, two against Australia and one against New Zealand. One of their losses was a 30–0 thumping by reigning Premiers Manly-Warringah only 4 days before the 1st Ashes test.

Game	Date	Result	Venue	Attendance
1	27 May	Great Britain Lions def. North Queensland 66–16	Cairns Showgrounds, Cairns	4,181
2	1 June	Great Britain Lions def. Newcastle Knights 24–12	Marathon Stadium, Newcastle	8,970
3	5 June	Northern Division def. Great Britain Lions 36–12	Scully Park, Tamworth	4,000
4	7 June	Manly-Warringah Sea Eagles def. Great Britain Lions 30–0	Brookvale Oval, Sydney	21,131
5	11 June	Australia def. Great Britain 17–6	Sydney Football Stadium, Sydney	24,480
6	16 June	Great Britain Lions def. Combined Brisbane 28–14	Lang Park, Brisbane	1,810
7	17 June	Great Britain Lions def. Central Queensland 64–8	Browne Park, Rockhampton	4,418
8	22 June	Great Britain Lions def. Toowoomba / S-E Queensland 14–0	Athletic Oval, Toowoomba	3,874
9	25 June	Great Britain Lions def. Wide Bay 28–12	Albert Park, Gympie	2,310
10	26 June	Australia def. Great Britain 34–14	Lang Park, Brisbane	27,130
11	3 July	Great Britain Lions def. Western Division 28–26	Wade Park, Orange	3,520
12	5 July	President's XIII def. Great Britain Lions 24–16	Seiffert Oval, Queanbeyan	6,037
13	9 July	Great Britain def. Australia 26–12	Sydney Football Stadium, Sydney	15,944
