= Troy McCarthy =

Australian rugby league footballer and coach

Personal information
- Full name: Troy Robert McCarthy
- Born: 14 December 1966 (age 58)

Playing information
- Position: Centre, Fullback
Club
Years	Team	Pld	T	G	FG	P
1988–93	Gold Coast	45	5	22	0	64
1991–92	Hull KR	13	4	0	0	16
	Total	58	9	22	0	80
- Father: Bob McCarthy
- Relatives: Darren McCarthy (brother)

Troy Robert McCarthy (born 14 December 1966) is an Australian former professional rugby league footballer who played for Gold Coast in the NSWRL.

== Biography ==
McCarthy, a Queensland junior representative, was a foundation player for the Gold Coast in the 1988 NSWRL season, coming off the bench in the team’s inaugural match, a 21-10 loss to the Canterbury-Bankstown Bulldogs at Seagulls Stadium. Then known as Gold Coast-Tweed, the club was coached by his father, Australian former representative Bob McCarthy.

From 1988 to 1993, McCarthy made 45 first-grade appearances for the Gold Coast, mostly as a centre and full-back.

During his time with the Gold Coast he also had a stint in England playing for Hull Kingston Rovers, in the 1991–92 Championship.

He has an elder brother, Darren McCarthy, who played for South Sydney and Canterbury.

His coaching career includes a Queensland Cup premiership with the Tweed Heads Seagulls to 2007.
