= Pobjie =

Pobjie is a surname, popular in Australia. Notable people with the surname include:

- Kevin Pobjie, former Australian professional rugby league player
- Michael Pobjie (born 1961), former Australian professional rugby league player
- Ben Pobjie, Australian writer and comedian. As of 25/08/18 he works for the ABC
