= Darren McCarthy =

Darren McCarthy may refer to:

- Darren McCarthy (24 character), a character on the TV series 24
- Darren McCarthy (hurler) (born 1990), Irish hurler
- Darren McCarthy (rugby league) (born 1963), Australian rugby league footballer
