= Warren Fenton =

Australian rugby league footballer

Personal information
- Full name: Warren Gordon Fenton
- Born: 23 September 1958 (age 68) Sydney, New South Wales, Australia

Playing information
- Position: Five-eighth, Lock
Club
Years	Team	Pld	T	G	FG	P
1978–87	Penrith Panthers	145	19	0	0	62

Warren Fenton (born 23 September 1958) is an Australian former professional rugby league footballer who played during the 1970s and 1980s. He played his entire club football career with the Penrith Panthers. He played primarily at lock, but also played the occasional game at five-eighth

== Playing career ==
Fenton was a local Penrith junior. He made his first grade debut from the bench in his sides' 32−9 loss to the Manly-Warringah Sea Eagles in round 13 of the 1978 season. Fenton made his first appearance in the starting side when he was chosen at five-eighth in round 1 of the 1979 season. Later in the 1979 season, he would shift into the lock position where he would play the remainder of his career.

The 1980s was a decade of highs and lows for Penrith. 1980–83 saw Penrith finish at, or near, the bottom of the table. Fenton had his best season in 1982, playing in all 26 games and scoring 6 tries. In 1984, Tim Sheens took over as coach. Sheens' appointment saw a reversal in the club's fortunes. They went from being easybeats (not having made a finals appearance before) to title contenders. In 1984, they had their best season at that point, finishing 6th, one point outside the five. Sheens was able to instill in Penrith something they had never possessed before, consistency. At one stage they won a record (for Penrith at the time) 5 straight games. They seemed assured of making history but at the most critical time of the season suffered a drop in form, winning only 1 of their last 4 games. 1984 was also the year that saw the debut of future club stalwart Greg Alexander.

The Panthers went one better in 1985, when they defeated the Manly-Warringah Sea Eagles 10–7 at the SCG in a play off for fifth spot. Their joy was short lived however as they were comprehensively defeated 38-6 by a star-studded Parramatta Eels team the following weekend in the qualifying final.

Fenton was a tireless worker in both attack and defense in his ten years at the Penrith club, often topping the tackling tables for his side. Fenton retired from playing at the conclusion of the 1987 season. He finished his career having played 145 games and scoring 19 tries. At the time of his retirement in 1987 until Brad Izzard surpassed him in the 1989 season, he was the third most capped Penrith Panthers player behind Tim Sheens and Royce Simmons. He currently ranks at 21st.

== Post playing ==
In October 2006, Fenton narrowly missed out on selection in the Panthers' Team of Legends. Colin van der Voort was instead chosen as the lock.
