= Gary Bridge =

Australian rugby league footballer

Personal information
- Full name: Gary Bridge
- Born: 23 June 1961 (age 63); Taree, New South Wales, Australia

Playing information
- Position: Five-eighth, Wing, Centre, Halfback
Club
| Years | Team | Pld | T | G | FG | P |
|---|---|---|---|---|---|---|
| 1982–86 | Balmain Tigers | 104 | 32 | 0 | 1 | 122 |
| 1986–87 | Oldham | 23 | 8 | 0 | 0 | 32 |
| 1988–90 | Eastern Suburbs | 18 | 5 | 1 | 0 | 22 |
| | Total | 145 | 45 | 1 | 1 | 176 |
- Source: As of 15 May 2019

Gary Bridge nicknamed "Parrot" is an Australian former rugby league footballer who played in the 1980s and 1990s. He played for Balmain and Eastern Suburbs in the New South Wales Rugby League (NSWRL) competition and for Oldham RLFC in England.

== Background ==
Bridge was a Taree United junior before he switched to play with Wingham Tigers. Bridge was selected to play for NSW Country seconds in 1981 and gained attention from Balmain who elected to sign him.

== Playing career ==
Bridge joined Balmain in 1982 and made his first grade debut for the club in Round 1 against Cronulla-Sutherland. In 1983, Bridge finished as the club's top try scorer with 13 tries as Balmain finished 4th on the table. Balmain were eliminated in the semi-final by St George 17–14.

In 1985, Balmain finished second on the table and reached the minor semi final against Parramatta. Bridge captained the side as they were soundly beaten 32–4. In 1986, Bridge played in nearly every game for Balmain as they reached the preliminary final against Canterbury-Bankstown. Balmain would suffer further finals heartbreak losing to Canterbury 28–16. This would be the last match that Bridge would play for Balmain.

Between 1986 and 1987, Bridge played in England with Oldham R.L.F.C. before returning to Australia and signing with Eastern Suburbs. Bridge spent 3 seasons at Easts who struggled towards the bottom of the table before retiring at the end of 1990.

== Post playing ==
In 2015, Bridge became the coach of Taree City. On 10 December 2018, Bridge was inducted into the Group 3 rugby league hall of fame.
