= Chris Houghton (rugby league) =

Australian rugby league footballer (born 1959)

Personal information
- Born: 14 October 1959 (age 67)

Playing information
- Position: Centre, Second-row
Club
Years	Team	Pld	T	G	FG	P
1983	Penrith Panthers	23	10	0	0	40
1984	Parramatta Eels	8	0	0	0	0
1985–87	Penrith Panthers	34	2	0	0	8
1988–89	Canberra Raiders	17	0	0	0	0
	Total	82	12	0	0	48
Representative
Years	Team	Pld	T	G	FG	P
1981	NSW Country	2	0	0	0	0

Chris Houghton (born 14 October 1959) is an Australian former rugby league footballer.

== Rugby league career ==
Originally from Leeton, Houghton was a NSW Country representative in 1981.

Houghton started his NSWRFL first–grade career with the Penrith Panthers, playing primarily as a centre before developing into a second rower. His Penrith career came in two stints, interrupted by one season with the Parramatta Eels. While in Sydney, Houghton completed studies at the Hawkesbury Agricultural College and briefly taught at a Catholic high school in Bonnyrigg. He joined the Department of Agriculture as a trainee agronomist when he signed with the Canberra Raiders, where his first–grade opportunities came mostly off the bench, but he did gain captaincy honours with the reserves.
