= Brandon Lee (rugby league) =

Australian rugby league footballer

Personal information
- Born: 5 November 1964 (age 61) Penrith, New South Wales, Australia

Playing information
- Position: Prop, Hooker, Second-row
Club
Years	Team	Pld	T	G	FG	P
1984–87	Penrith Panthers	28	0	0	0	0
1988–90	Canterbury Bulldogs	29	2	0	0	8
1992	Penrith Panthers	4	0	0	1	1
	Total	61	2	0	1	9
- Source: As of 24 October 2019

Brandon Lee (born 5 November 1964) is an Australian former professional rugby league footballer who primarily played as a prop. The teams he played for at a club level were Penrith and Canterbury-Bankstown.

== Playing career ==
Lee made his first grade debut for Penrith in round 26 of the 1984 season against Parramatta at Penrith Park.

The following year, Penrith reached their first finals campaign since entering the competition in 1967. Lee played in their 38–6 loss against Parramatta in the minor preliminary semi final.

Lee played with Penrith until the end of the 1987 season before signing with Canterbury. In his first year at Canterbury, Lee played in the 1988 grand final victory over Balmain at the Sydney Football Stadium.

Lee returned to Penrith in 1991 but only played 4 games for the first grade team. Lee did not play in Penrith's maiden premiership victory over the Canberra Raiders.
