= Gary Webster (rugby league) =

Australian rugby league footballer

Personal information
- Full name: Gary Kenneth Webster
- Born: 24 October 1957 (age 68) Sydney, New South Wales, Australia
- Died: 10 September 2005 (aged 47)

Playing information
- Position: Second-row, Prop
Club
Years	Team	Pld	T	G	FG	P
1979–82	Balmain Tigers	37	3	0	0	9
1983	Newtown Jets	22	1	0	0	4
1984–87	Western Suburbs	36	2	0	0	8
	Total	95	6	0	0	21
- Source: As of 8 July 2019

Gary Webster is an Australian former rugby league footballer who played in the 1970s and 1980s. He played for Newtown, Balmain and Western Suburbs in the New South Wales Rugby League (NSWRL) competition.

== Playing career ==
Webster made his first grade debut for Balmain against Eastern Suburbs in Round 1 1979 at Leichhardt Oval.

Webster would go on to be a regular within the Balmain team over the coming seasons although his time at the club was not very successful with the club finishing last in 1981, one of only four times that Balmain had finished last since entering the competition in 1908.

In 1983, Webster joined Newtown. Webster played 22 games for Newtown in 1983 which would prove to be the club's last in the top grade of Australian rugby league. Webster played in Newtown's final ever match in the NSWRL premiership, which was a 9–6 victory over the Canberra Raiders at Campbelltown Stadium.

In 1984, Webster joined Western Suburbs after Newtown were evicted from the premiership for financial reasons. In his first season at Wests, the club finished last on the table and claimed the wooden spoon. Webster continued to play for Wests as the club struggled towards the bottom of the ladder.

In his final season at Wests, the club finished last again and Webster retired following the conclusion of the 1987 season.

Webster died 10 September 2005, aged 47 of leukemia.
