= John Bilbija =

Australian rugby league footballer (1958 or 1959 – 2024)

Personal information
- Full name: John Bilbija
- Born: 11 November 1958
- Died: 25 August 2024 (aged 65)

Playing information
- Position: Second-row
Club
Years	Team	Pld	T	G	FG	P
1980–81	Balmain Tigers	4	1	0	0	3
1982	Parramatta Eels	1	0	0	0	0
1986–87	Western Suburbs	40	1	0	0	4
1988	South Sydney	4	0	0	0	0
	Total	49	2	0	0	7
- Source: As of 28 December 2022

John Bilbija (1958 or 1959 – 25 August 2024) was an Australian professional rugby league footballer who played in the 1980s. He played for Western Suburbs, Balmain, Parramatta and South Sydney in the NSWRL competition.

== Playing career ==
Bilbija made his first grade debut for Balmain in round 4 of the 1980 NSWRL season against Cronulla-Sutherland at Leichhardt Oval. The following season, he was limited to only one appearance as the club finished with the wooden spoon. In 1982, Bilbija signed for defending premiers Parramatta and made one appearance for the club in round 2 against his former side Balmain.

During the next three years, Bilbija played district rugby league. In 1985, he was awarded best A-grade player in Parramatta Junior League, playing with the Merrylands club.

In 1986, Bilbija joined Western Suburbs and made 40 appearances over two years however in his final season the club finished with the wooden spoon. In 1988, Bilbija signed for South Sydney and played four games for the club but was released at the end of the year.

== Death ==
Bilbija died on 25 August 2024, at the age of 65.
