= Joe Thomas (rugby league) =

Australian rugby league footballer

Personal information
- Born: 13 February 1964 (age 61)

Playing information
- Position: Hooker
Club
Years	Team	Pld	T	G	FG	P
1984–87	South Sydney	20	2	0	0	8
1988–90	Canterbury Bulldogs	55	7	0	0	28
1991–93	Western Suburbs	53	4	0	0	16
1994	Illawarra Steelers	6	1	0	0	4
	Total	134	14	0	0	56
Representative
Years	Team	Pld	T	G	FG	P
1991–93	NSW City	2	0	0	0	0

Joe Thomas (born 13 February 1964) is an Australian former professional rugby league footballer who played for South Sydney, Canterbury, Western Suburbs and Illawarra in the New South Wales Rugby League.

== Playing career ==
A Mascot junior, Thomas started his NSWRL career with South Sydney, playing as a lock forward. His first-grade appearances at South Sydney were limited by serious injuries.

Thomas was a hooker in Canterbury's 1988 premiership team, which defeated Balmain in the grand final. In his three seasons at Canterbury he played 55 first-grade games.

From 1991 to 1993, he played for Western Suburbs and while at the club made two representative appearances for NSW City. He was one of Western Suburb's captains during this period.

He finished his career with a season at Illawarra in 1994

== Post playing ==
In 1994, he was appointed an assistant coach under Phil Gould at Eastern Suburbs.

== Personal life ==
Thomas's elderly mother Mary died in 2010 of head injuries sustained when she fell to the ground after being assaulted by a cyclist on an Eastlakes street. The attacker, Daniel Paul Wood, had got off his bike after passing the 71-year old and walked back 10-metres to push her in the chest, an altercation brought about by his belief she had been in his way. Wood, who was intoxicated, was charged with murder, but the court accepted a guilty plea for manslaughter, sentencing him to five-years in prison.
