= Bob McCarthy =

Australian RL coach and former Australia international rugby league footballer

Bob McCarthy MBE
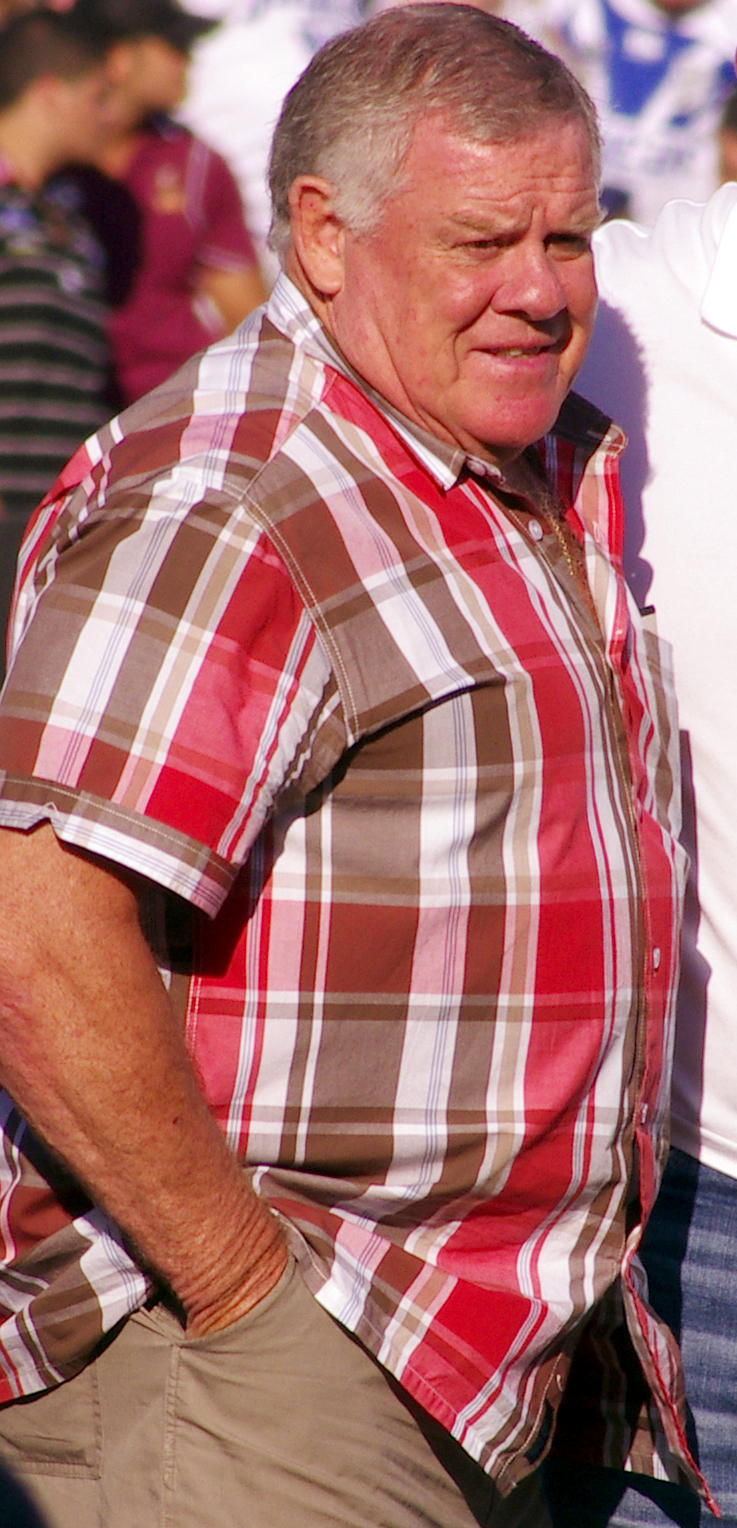

Personal information
- Full name: Robert John McCarthy
- Born: 5 August 1944 (age 82) Sydney, New South Wales, Australia

Playing information
- Position: Second-row
Club
Years	Team	Pld	T	G	FG	P
1963–75	South Sydney	206	100	0	1	301
1976–77	Canterbury-Bankstown	40	19	0	0	57
1978	South Sydney	5	0	0	0	0
	Total	251	119	0	1	358
Representative
Years	Team	Pld	T	G	FG	P
1969–74	New South Wales	11	7	0	0	21
1969–74	Australia	15	7	0	1	22

Coaching information
Club
Years	Team	Gms	W	D	L	W%
1980–83	Souths (Brisbane)	78	53	2	23	68
1988–90	Gold Coast Giants	66	15	3	48	23
1975–94	South Sydney	9	1	0	8	11
	Total	153	69	5	79	45
Representative
Years	Team	Gms	W	D	L	W%
	Brisbane
- Relatives: Troy McCarthy (son); Darren McCarthy (son)

Robert John McCarthy MBE (born 5 August 1944) is an Australian former professional rugby league footballer and coach. He played for the South Sydney Rabbitohs, Canterbury-Bankstown Bulldogs, New South Wales and for the Australian national side. He later coached in Brisbane, taking Souths Magpies to a premiership in 1981 and coaching the Gold Coast-Tweed Giants upon their entry to the Winfield Cup. Since 2001 he has been the chairman of both the Australian and NSW state selection panels.

== Biography ==
=== Career highlights ===
A fast and strong second-row McCarthy played 10 tests for Australia and five matches in two World Cups. He made the 1973 Kangaroo Tour and two tours of New Zealand. He played 211 first grade games for Souths (1963–1975 and 1978), scoring 100 tries. He played in three grand final victories (1967, 1970 and 1971) and in two losing grand finals (1965 and 1969).

=== Club career ===
Born in inner city Surry Hills, New South Wales in Sydney in an Irish-Australian Roman Catholic family, McCarthy was a South Sydney junior with the Moore Park Club and made his first grade debut in 1963. In 1965 he was in the team of young Rabbitohs who challenged St George in the Grand Final in front of a record breaking crowd of 78,065 at the Sydney Cricket Ground. Along with McCarthy the nucleus of this side was John O'Neill, Ron Coote, Eric Simms, Mike Cleary and John Sattler who went on to feature in Australian representative teams for the next six years and who would help create a golden period for South Sydney at the end of the 1960s, and in the early years of the next decade.

The advent of the four tackle rule in 1967 was tailor-made for the athletic, barrel-chested McCarthy and his coach Clive Churchill gave him license to stand wide in attack to make best use of his tank-like charges.

One of the most spectacular tries in Grand Final history came from such positional play when just before halftime in the 1967 decider against Canterbury McCarthy intercepted a pass out wide from Canterbury hooker Col Brown and ran the length of the field to score and to take the Rabbitohs to a two-point lead which they didn't give up by game's end.

He missed Souths 1968 Grand Final victory, played in the 1969 loss to the Balmain Tigers and was a member of the 1970 and 1971 premiership sides. It was primarily McCarthy's retribution which saw Manly's John Bucknall leave the field before half-time in the 1970 Grand Final after Bucknall had earlier broken the jaw of Souths captain John Sattler and the Souths forwards had regrouped to protect and avenge their captain. In the 1971 Grand Final against St George Ron Coote made a break and passed to McCarthy who raced away to score under the posts to seal Souths 16–10 Grand Final win.

In 1975 McCarthy became only the second forward in the history of the game after Frank Burge to surpass the 100 career try tally.

McCarthy moved to Canterbury for the 1976 and 1977 seasons where he played at Prop forward and played 37 games for the club helping them to the semi-finals in 1976. He returned to the Rabbitohs in 1978 to finish his career in a brief five-game season ended by injury.

=== Representative career ===
Bobby McCarthy first tasted representative football in 1964 scoring two tries for a New South Wales Colts side against a touring French team.

He had to wait until the 1969 tour of New Zealand before he made a national senior squad but thereafter, for the next five years barring injury, he was one of the first players selected for Test and World Cup squads.

He played in both Tests of the 1969 New Zealand tour. In the 1970 domestic Ashes series against Great Britain he appeared in the third Test and later that year in the World Cup in England where he played in all four of Australia's games including the victorious final.

He played three Tests in 1971–72 against New Zealand and appeared in one match in the 1972 World Cup in which campaign he was competing for the second row spots with his club teammates Paul Sait and Gary Stevens.

McCarthy was named as vice-captain to Graeme Langlands on the '73 Kangaroo Tour and his sole honour as Australia's Test captain was in the vital second Test in Leeds which the Kangaroos needed to win to keep the series alive. McCarthy scored a try early in the second half to help win the game but on the frozen ground he dislocated his shoulder in the process and his tour was over. He scored three tries in his two Test and 4 minor tour match appearances but had played a pivotal role in Australia's successful Ashes campaign.

In 1974 Test series at home against Great Britain, McCarthy was selected in the deciding 3rd game in a veteran pack including his old Souths teammates Coote, Stevens, and John O'Neill and captained and coached by Langlands. The old war-horses won the match 22–18 to retain the Ashes and McCarthy was one of the players who chaired Langlands from the field and who along with eight others were unknowingly making their farewell Test appearance.

=== Accolades ===
He was honoured with his MBE in 1977 for services to rugby league, only the second player after Langlands to be so honoured while still playing.

In 2004 he was named by Souths in their South Sydney Dream Team, consisting of 17 players and a coach representing the club from 1908 through to 2004.

In February 2008, McCarthy was named in the list of Australia's 100 Greatest Players (1908–2007) which was commissioned by the NRL and ARL to celebrate the code's centenary year in Australia.

=== Post-playing ===
McCarthy commenced coaching with Brisbane Souths in 1980 taking them to the Brisbane Rugby League Grand Final that year and to premiership victory in 1981. He coached the Brisbane rugby league team to victory in the 1984 Panasonic Cup.

McCarthy was the inaugural coach of the Gold Coast Seagulls in 1988 and for that club's first three seasons. In 1994, he was briefly the coach of the South Sydney before he stood aside for health reasons. McCarthy coached Souths to their upset 1994 Tooheys Challenge Cup final victory over Brisbane.

Since 2001, he has been the chairman of both the Australian and NSW State of Origin selection panels.

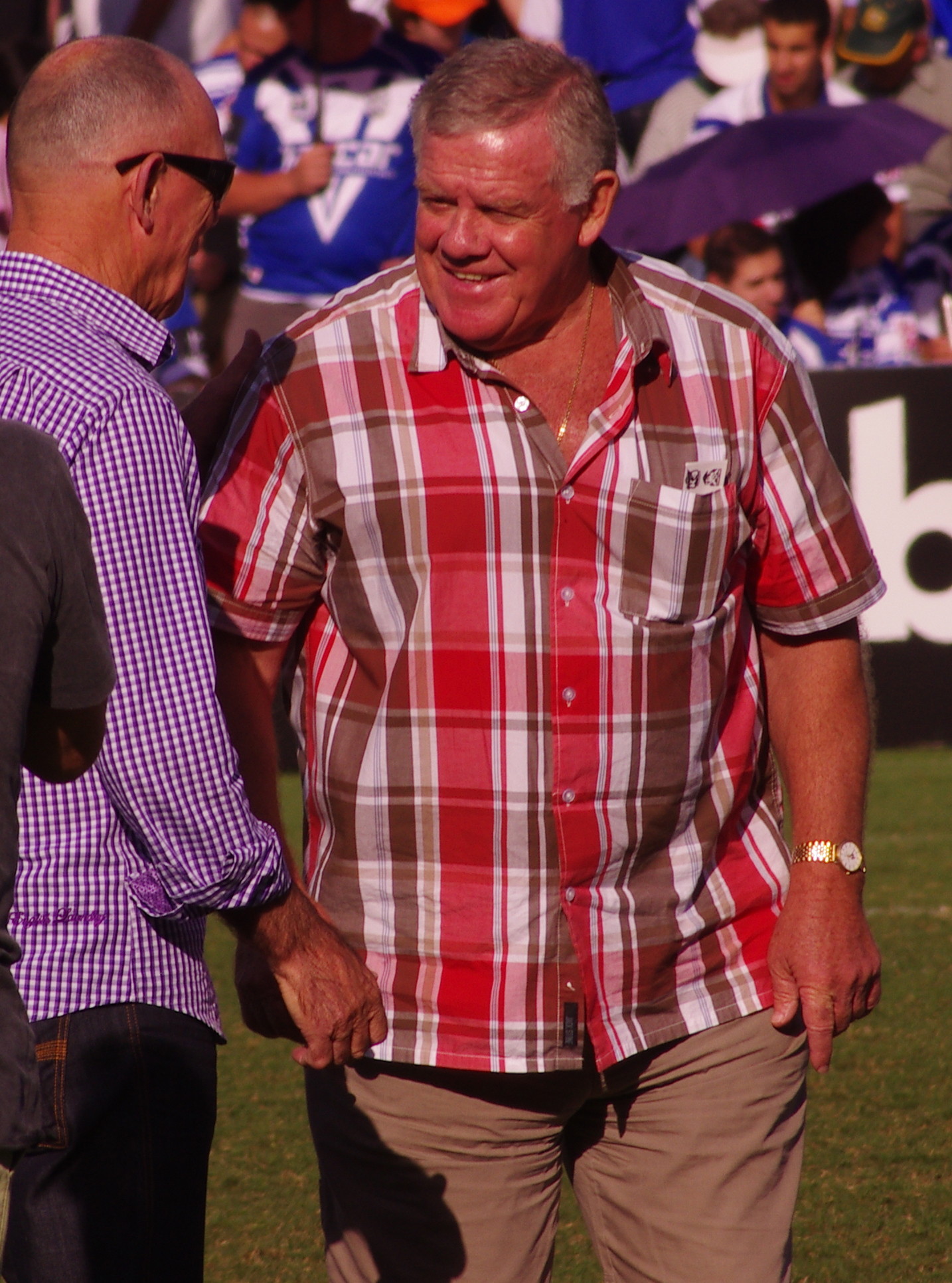
McCarthy in 2012

=== 1st Grade matches played ===
Team	Matches	Years
South Sydney	211	1963–75 & 1978
Canterbury	40	1976–77
New South Wales	11	1969–1974
Australia (Test & World Cup)	15	1969–74

== Sources ==
- Whiticker, Alan (2004) Captaining the Kangaroos, New Holland, Sydney
- Andrews, Malcolm (2006) The ABC of Rugby League Austn Broadcasting Corpn, Sydney

== Footnotes ==
Sporting positions
Preceded by Billy Smith	Captain Australia; 1973	Succeeded by Tom Raudonikis
