= Gavin Hanrahan =

Australian rugby league footballer

Personal information
- Full name: Gavin Hanrahan
- Born: 19 February 1965 (age 60)

Playing information
- Position: Centre, Wing
Club
Years	Team	Pld	T	G	FG	P
1984–87	Balmain Tigers	35	7	0	0	28
1988	Newcastle Knights	9	0	0	0	0
	Total	44	7	0	0	28
- Source: As of 5 February 2019

Gavin Hanrahan is a former professional rugby league footballer who played in the 1980s. He played for the Balmain Tigers from 1984 to 1987 and he was part of the inaugural Newcastle Knights squad in 1988.

== Playing career ==
Hanrahan made his first grade debut against North Sydney at Leichhardt Oval in Round 22 1984. In 1988, Hanrahan joined Newcastle who had just been admitted into the competition.

Hanrahan played in the club's first ever game, a 28–4 loss against Parramatta. Hanrahan's last game in first grade was a 32–20 loss against St George in Round 9 1988.
