= Darren McCarthy (rugby league) =

Australian rugby league footballer

Personal information
- Full name: Darren McCarthy
- Born: 1 November 1963 (age 62) Australia

Playing information
- Position: Centre, Wing
Club
Years	Team	Pld	T	G	FG	P
1983–86	South Sydney	54	22	0	0	88
1987–89	Canterbury Bulldogs	15	4	4	0	24
1990–91	South Sydney	10	1	3	0	10
	Total	79	27	7	0	122
- Source: As of 3 March 2018
- Father: Bob McCarthy
- Relatives: Troy McCarthy (brother)

Darren McCarthy (born 1 November 1963) is an Australian former professional rugby league footballer who primarily played as a centre.

The teams he played for at a club level were: the South Sydney Rabbitohs (1983−86, 1990−91) and the Canterbury-Bankstown Bulldogs (1987−89).
