= Michael Pobjie =

Australian rugby league footballer

Personal information
- Full name: Michael Pobjie
- Born: 28 April 1961 (age 65)

Playing information
- Position: Fullback, Centre
Club
Years	Team	Pld	T	G	FG	P
1981–82	Newtown	22	6	0	0	24
1983–87	South Sydney	91	28	0	0	112
1985–86	Salford	9	1	0	0	4
1988–90	Balmain Tigers	37	5	0	0	20
	Total	159	40	0	0	160

Michael Pobjie (born 28 April 1961) is an Australian former professional rugby league footballer who played in the 1980s. Pobjie played for Newtown, Souths and Balmain in the NSWRL competition, and for Salford in England. He played at either Fullback or Centre.

== Playing career ==
Pobjie started his first grade career at Newtown in 1981 but was not a part of the side which made the 1981 grand final against Parramatta. In 1983, Pobjie moved to Souths and played there for five seasons before moving to Balmain. Pobjie played in 1988 and 1989 grand finals for Balmain losing on both occasions, the latter of which has been described as one of the greatest grand finals of all time.

== Post playing ==
After retiring from rugby league, Pobjie became managing director of Prouds homes in Sydney's west but the company later collapsed and was liquidated.

He now teaches primary school children as a sport teacher on the Central Coast.
