= 1987 Cronulla-Sutherland Sharks season =

- NSWRL rank: 8th
- 1987 record: Wins: 11; draws: 1; losses: 12
- Points scored: For: 390 (66 tries, 63 goals); against: 433 (73 tries, 68 goals, 5 field goals)

Team information
- Coach: Jack Gibson
- Captain: David Hatch
- Stadium: Endeavour Field
- Avg. attendance: 8,550

Top scorers
- Tries: Glenn Coleman (10)
- Goals: Sean Watson (41)
- Points: Sean Watson (106)
← 1986	1988 →

The 1987 Cronulla-Sutherland Sharks season was the 21st in the club's history. They competed in the NSWRL's 1987 Winfield Cup premiership as well as the 1987 National Panasonic Cup.

== Ladder ==
	Team	Pld	W	D	L	B	PF	PA	PD	Pts
1	Manly-Warringah	24	18	1	5	2	553	356	+197	41
2	Eastern Suburbs	24	15	1	8	2	390	353	+37	35
3	Canberra	24	15	0	9	2	441	325	+116	34
4	Balmain	24	14	1	9	2	469	349	+120	33
5	South Sydney	24	13	1	10	2	310	342	-32	31
6	Canterbury-Bankstown	24	13	0	11	2	353	316	+37	30
7	Parramatta	24	12	0	12	2	417	411	+6	28
8	Cronulla-Sutherland	24	11	1	12	2	390	433	-43	27
9	St. George	24	10	2	12	2	394	409	-15	26
10	North Sydney	24	11	0	13	2	368	401	-33	26
11	Illawarra	24	8	0	16	2	372	449	-77	20
12	Penrith	24	6	1	17	2	274	399	-125	17
13	Western Suburbs	24	5	2	17	2	339	527	-188	16
