= 1989 Cronulla-Sutherland Sharks season =

- NSWRL rank: 6th
- 1989 record: Wins: 15; draws: 0; losses: 9
- Points scored: For: 416 (71 tries, 65 goals, 2 field goals); against: 326 (58 tries, 46 goals, 2 field goals)

Team information
- Coach: Allan Fitzgibbon
- Captain: David Hatch
- Stadium: Caltex Field
- Avg. attendance: 6,994

Top scorers
- Tries: Andrew Ettingshausen (14)
- Goals: Alan Wilson (40)
- Points: Alan Wilson (125)
← 1988	1990 →

The 1989 Cronulla-Sutherland Sharks season was the 23rd in the club's history. They competed in the NSWRL's 1989 Winfield Cup premiership as well as the 1989 Panasonic Cup.

== Ladder ==
	Team	Pld	W	D	L	PF	PA	PD	Pts
1	South Sydney	22	18	1	3	390	207	+183	37
2	Penrith	22	16	0	6	438	241	+197	32
3	Balmain	22	14	1	7	380	236	+144	29
4	Canberra	22	14	0	8	457	287	+170	28
5	Brisbane	22	14	0	8	398	290	+108	28
6	Cronulla-Sutherland	22	14	0	8	368	281	+87	28
7	Newcastle	22	11	0	11	281	281	0	22
8	Parramatta	22	11	0	11	346	366	-20	22
9	Canterbury-Bankstown	22	10	2	10	280	337	-57	22
10	St. George	22	10	0	12	330	356	-26	20
11	Eastern Suburbs	22	9	1	12	348	346	+2	19
12	Manly-Warringah	22	9	1	12	334	343	-9	19
13	Western Suburbs	22	7	1	14	229	389	-160	15
14	Gold Coast-Tweed	22	7	1	14	223	383	-160	15
15	North Sydney	22	5	1	16	194	406	-212	11
16	Illawarra	22	2	1	19	256	503	-247	5
