= 1990 Cronulla-Sutherland Sharks season =

- NSWRL rank: 10th
- 1990 record: Wins: 11; draws: 0; losses: 11
- Points scored: For: 370 (60 tries, 64 goals, 2 field goals); against: 359 (60 tries, 59 goals, 1 field goal)

Team information
- Coach: Allan Fitzgibbon
- Captain: David Hatch
- Stadium: Caltex Field
- Avg. attendance: 9,893

Top scorers
- Tries: Andrew Ettingshausen (12)
- Goals: Alan Wilson (37)
- Points: Alan Wilson (102)
← 1989	1991 →

The 1990 Cronulla-Sutherland Sharks season was the 24th in the club's history. Coached by Allan Fitzgibbon and captained David Hatch, they competed in the NSWRL's 1990 Winfield Cup premiership. The Sharks finished the regular season in 10th place (out of 16), failing to reach the finals.

== Ladder ==
	Team	Pld	W	D	L	PF	PA	PD	Pts
1	Canberra	22	16	1	5	532	245	+287	33
2	Brisbane	22	16	1	5	478	278	+200	33
3	Penrith	22	15	1	6	415	286	+129	31
4	Manly-Warringah	22	15	0	7	395	255	+125	30
5	Balmain	22	14	0	8	432	284	+148	28
6	Newcastle	22	13	2	7	344	305	+39	28
7	Canterbury-Bankstown	22	12	1	9	354	291	+65	25
8	Parramatta	22	12	1	9	387	347	+40	25
9	Illawarra	22	11	1	10	366	361	+5	23
10	Cronulla-Sutherland	22	11	0	11	370	359	+11	22
11	North Sydney	22	10	0	12	322	298	+24	20
12	St. George	22	8	0	14	371	399	-28	16
13	Western Suburbs	22	6	1	15	323	433	-110	13
14	Eastern Suburbs	22	6	1	15	283	547	-264	13
15	Gold Coast-Tweed	22	4	0	18	233	567	-334	8
16	South Sydney	22	2	0	20	302	652	-350	4
