= 1988 Cronulla-Sutherland Sharks season =

- NSWRL rank: 1st
- 1988 record: Wins: 16; draws: 2; losses: 6
- Points scored: For: 517 (81 tries, 95 goals, 3 field goals); against: 365 (61 tries, 59 goals, 3 field goals)

Team information
- Coach: Allan Fitzgibbon
- Captain: David Hatch
- Stadium: Caltex Field
- Avg. attendance: 9,789

Top scorers
- Tries: Andrew Ettingshausen (17)
- Goals: Alan Wilson (69)
- Points: Alan Wilson (167)
← 1987	1989 →

The 1988 Cronulla-Sutherland Sharks season was the 22nd in the club's history. They competed in the NSWRL's 1988 Winfield Cup premiership and finished the regular season as minor premiers. They then came within one match of the grand final but were knocked out by the Balmain Tigers. The Sharks also competed in the 1988 Panasonic Cup.

Three Sharks players, Andrew Ettinghausen, Gavin Miller and Mark McGaw were selected to make their international debuts for Australia in 1988.

== Ladder ==
	Team	Pld	W	D	L	PF	PA	PD	Pts
1	Cronulla-Sutherland	22	16	2	4	507	330	+177	34
2	Canterbury-Bankstown	22	16	0	6	412	268	+144	32
3	Canberra	22	15	0	7	596	346	+250	30
4	Manly-Warringah	22	15	0	7	538	347	+191	30
5	Penrith	22	15	0	7	394	258	+136	30
6	Balmain	22	15	0	7	402	341	+61	30
7	Brisbane	22	14	0	8	474	368	+106	28
8	South Sydney	22	12	2	8	425	383	+42	24
9	North Sydney	22	9	2	11	366	424	-58	20
10	St. George	22	9	0	13	352	493	-141	18
11	Parramatta	22	8	0	14	359	412	-53	16
12	Eastern Suburbs	22	6	3	13	387	443	-56	15
13	Illawarra	22	6	1	15	353	510	-157	13
14	Newcastle	22	5	1	16	270	460	-190	11
15	Gold Coast-Tweed	22	4	2	16	238	484	-246	10
16	Western Suburbs	22	4	1	17	287	493	-206	9

- South Sydney were stripped of 2 competition points due to an illegal replacement in one game.
