= 1989 NSWRL season =

Rugby league competition

1989 New South Wales Rugby League premiership
- Teams: 16
- Premiers: Canberra (1st title)
- Minor premiers: South Sydney (17th title)
- Matches played: 183
- Points scored: 5,537
- Total attendance: 2,040,375
- Top points scorer(s): Ricky Walford (146); Andy Currier (146)
- Wooden spoon: Illawarra (3rd spoon)
- Rothmans Medal: Gavin Miller & Mark Sargent
- Top try-scorer: Gary Belcher (17)

The 1989 NSWRL season was the 82nd season of professional rugby league football in Australia. Sixteen clubs competed for the New South Wales Rugby League's J.J. Giltinan Shield and Winfield Cup Premiership during the season, which culminated in a grand final between Balmain and Canberra. This season NSWRL teams also competed for the 1989 Panasonic Cup. This would be the last time a mid-season competition was played concurrent with the regular season. From 1990 it would become a pre-season competition.

== Season summary ==
Twenty-two regular season rounds were played from March till August, resulting in a top five of South Sydney, Penrith, Balmain, Canberra and Cronulla (who finished equal with Brisbane but beat them in a play-off for fifth) to battle it out in the finals.

This year Penrith forward Geoff Gerard set new record for most first-grade NSWRL premiership games at 320 before retiring at the end of the season.

The 1989 season's Rothmans Medal was shared by Cronulla-Sutherland forward Gavin Miller and Newcastle front-rower Mark Sargent. Miller also won the Dally M Award and was named Rugby League Week's player of the year.

The grand finals:

- Canberra Raiders vs Balmain Tigers (Senior Grade)
- North Sydney Bears vs Parramatta Eels (Reserve Grade)
- South Sydney Rabbitohs vs Canberra Raiders (Under-21s Grade)
- Brisbane Broncos vs Illawarra Steelers (Mid-week)

The winners in all grades were:

- Canberra Raiders (Senior Grade)
- North Sydney Bears (Reserve Grade)
- South Sydney Rabbitohs (Under-21s Grade)
- Brisbane Broncos (Mid-week)

The State of Origin Series

- Queensland vs New South Wales

=== Teams ===
The lineup of teams remained unchanged from the previous season, with sixteen clubs contesting the premiership, including five Sydney-based foundation teams, another six from Sydney, two from greater New South Wales, two from Queensland, and one from the Australian Capital Territory.

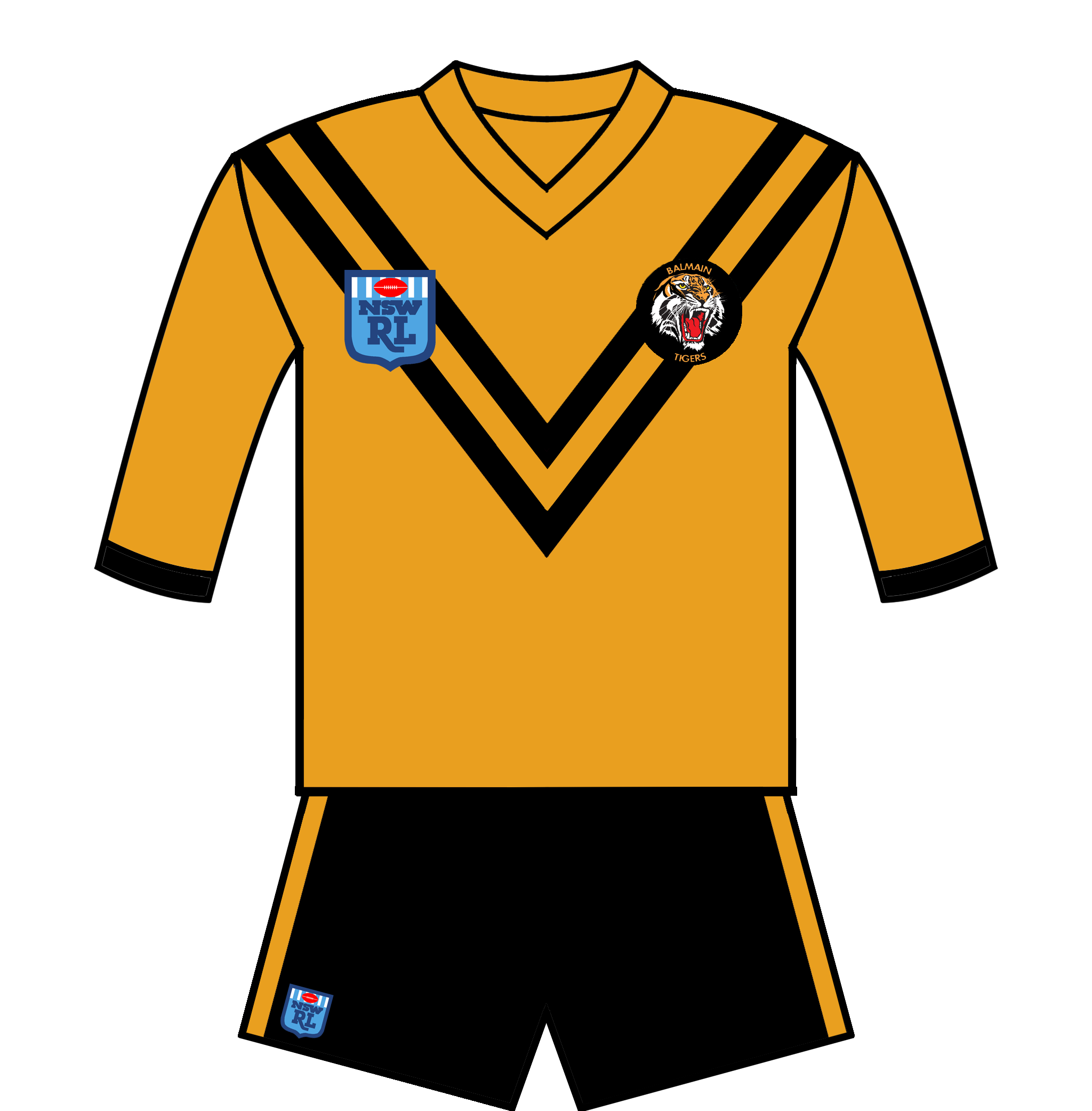
Balmain 82nd season Ground: Leichhardt Oval; Coach: Warren Ryan; Captain: Wayne Pearce

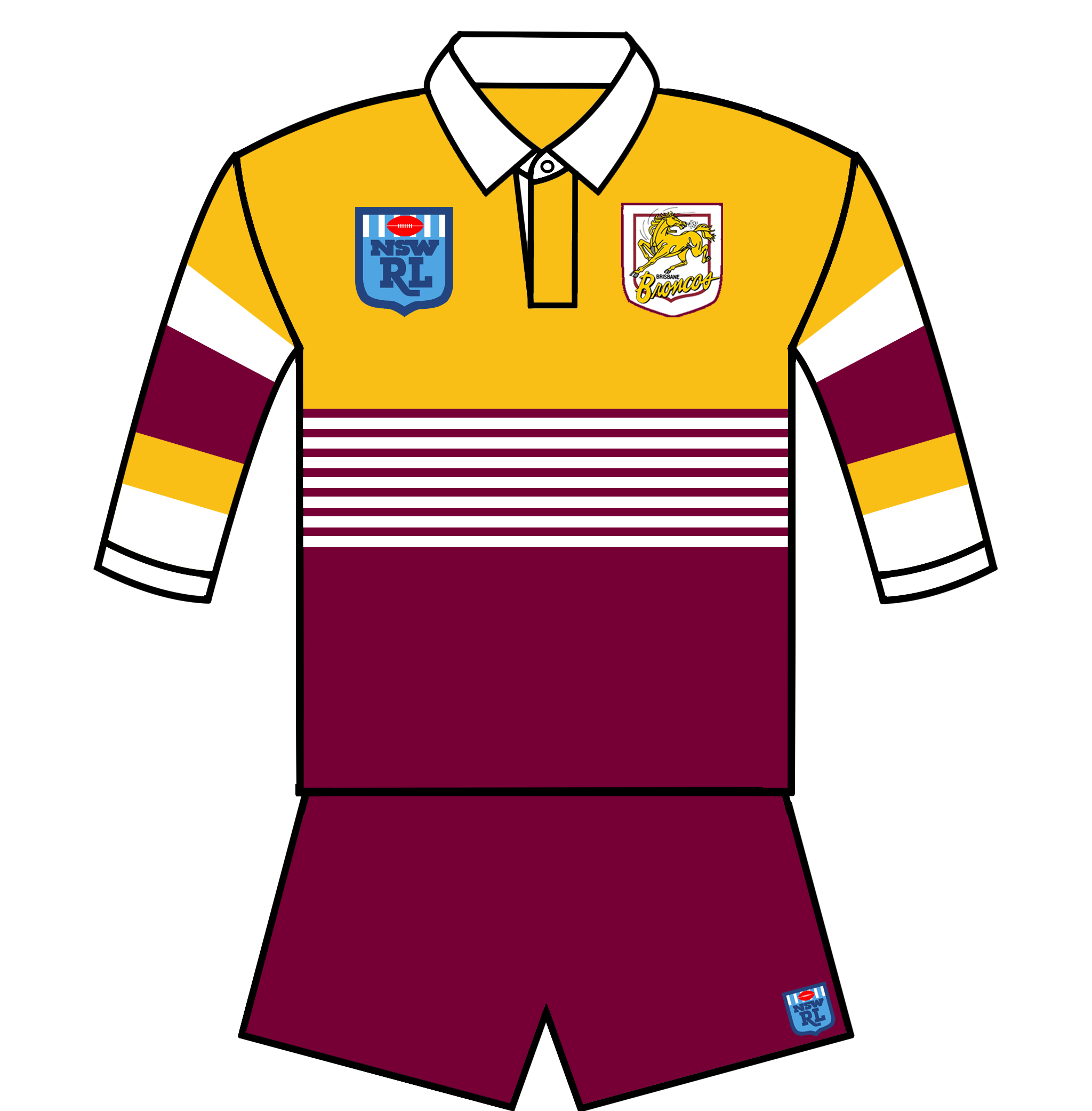
Brisbane 2nd season Ground: Lang Park; Coach: Wayne Bennett; Captain: Wally Lewis

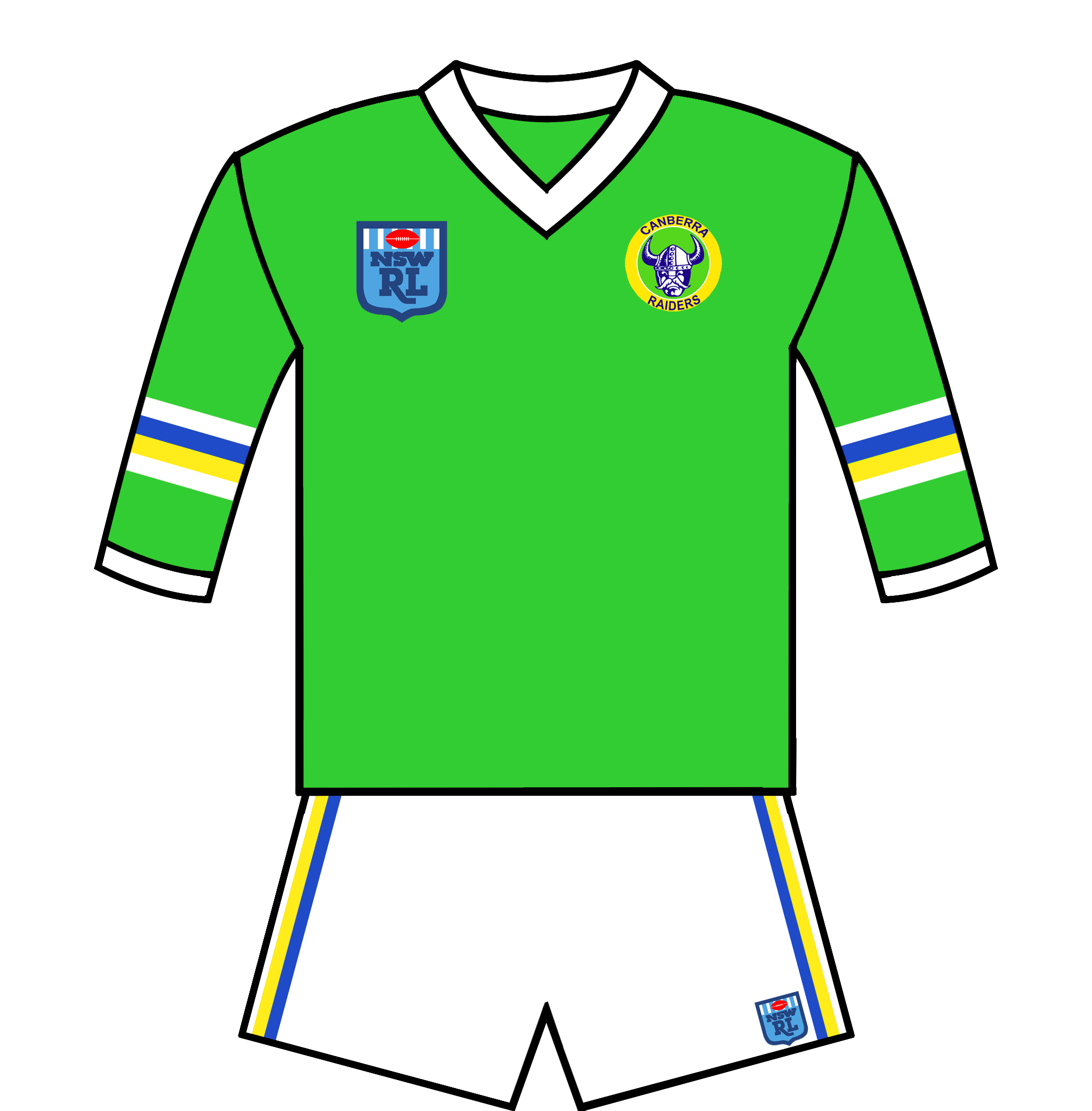
Canberra 8th season Ground: Seiffert Oval; Coach: Tim Sheens; Captain: Mal Meninga

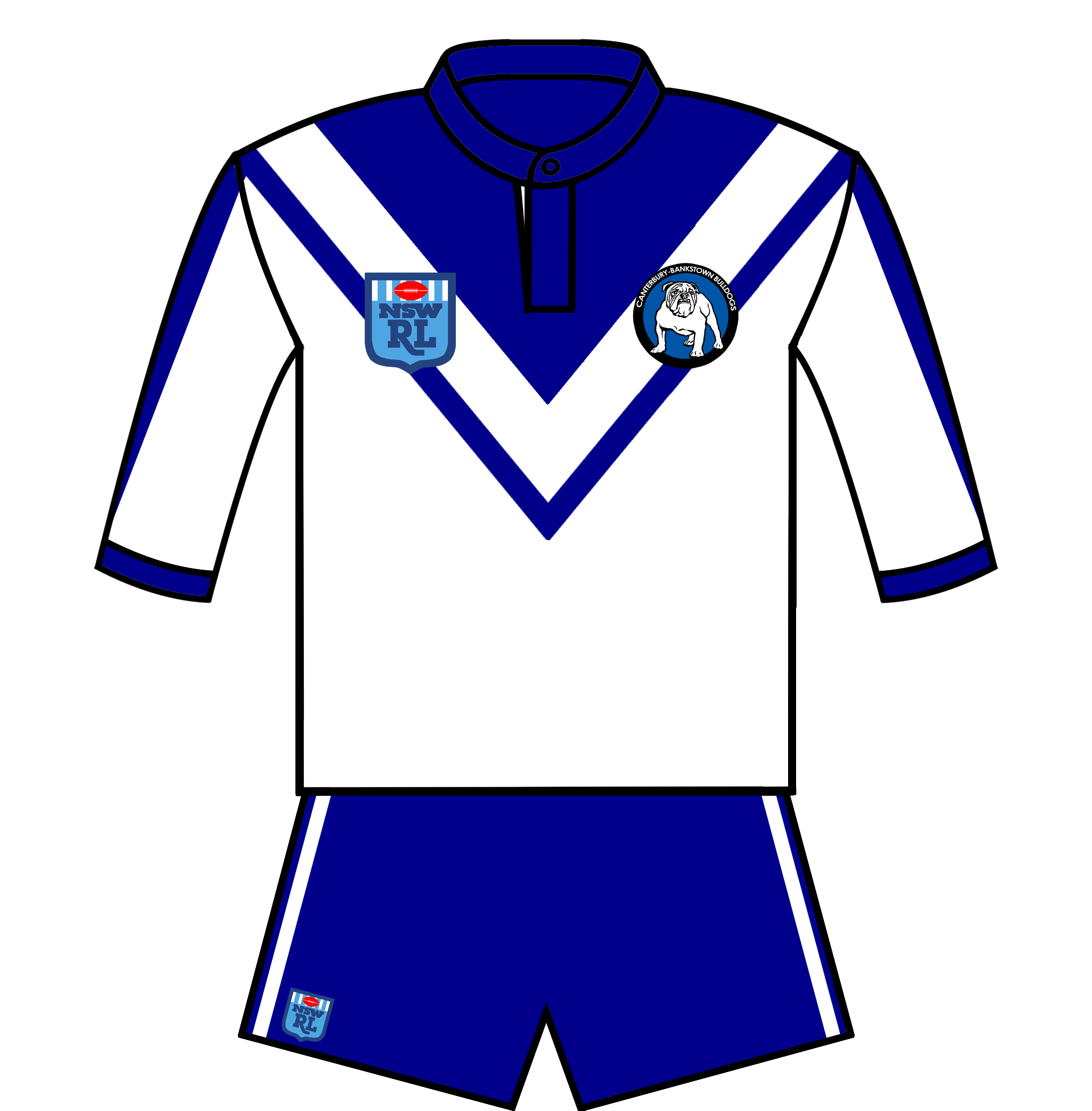
Canterbury-Bankstown 55th season Ground: Belmore Oval; Coach: Phil Gould; Captain: Peter Tunks

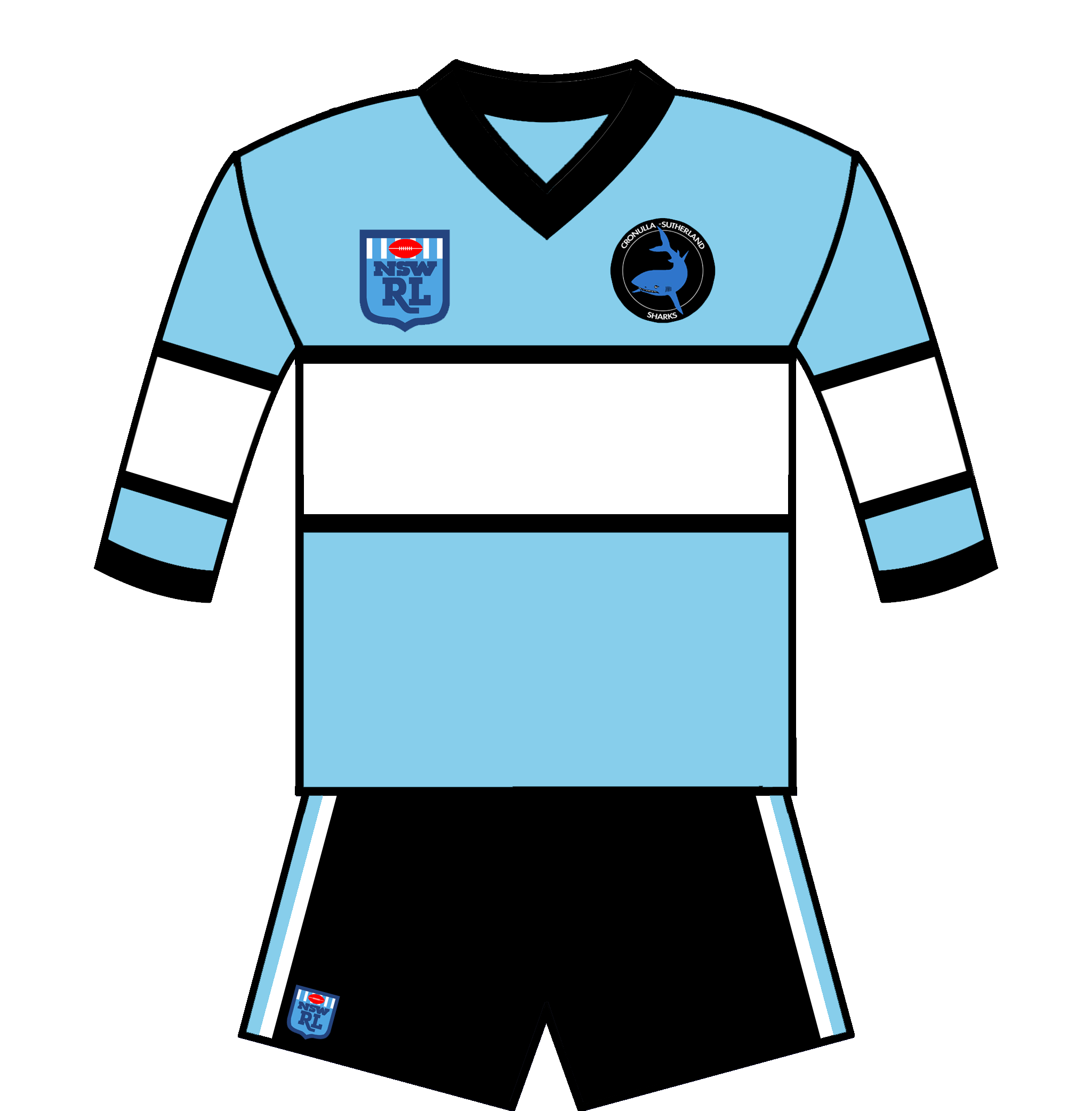
Cronulla-Sutherland 23rd season Ground: Caltex Field; Coach: Allan Fitzgibbon; Captain: David Hatch

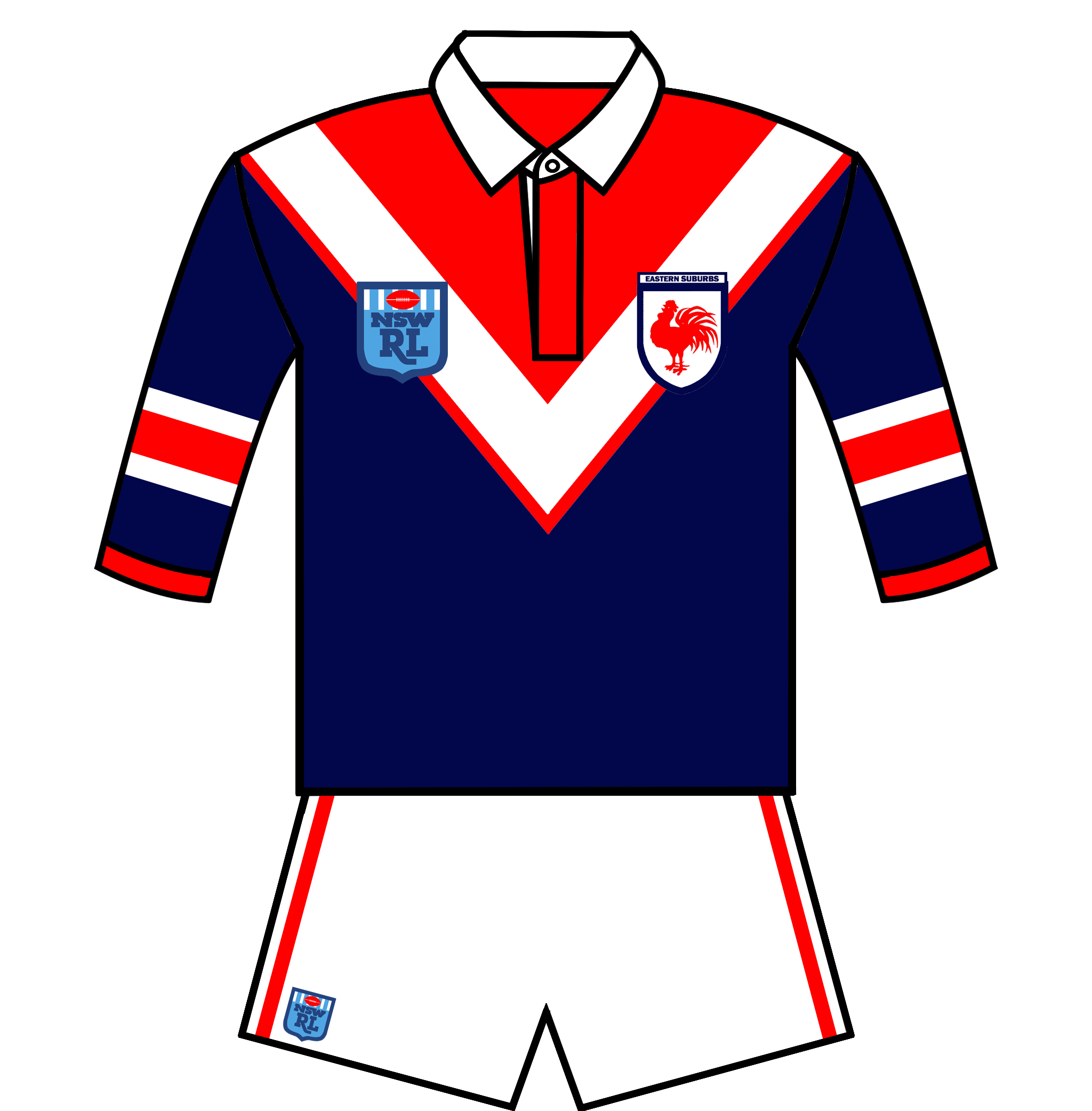
Eastern Suburbs 82nd season Ground: Sydney Football Stadium; Coach: Russell Fairfax; Captain: Hugh McGahan

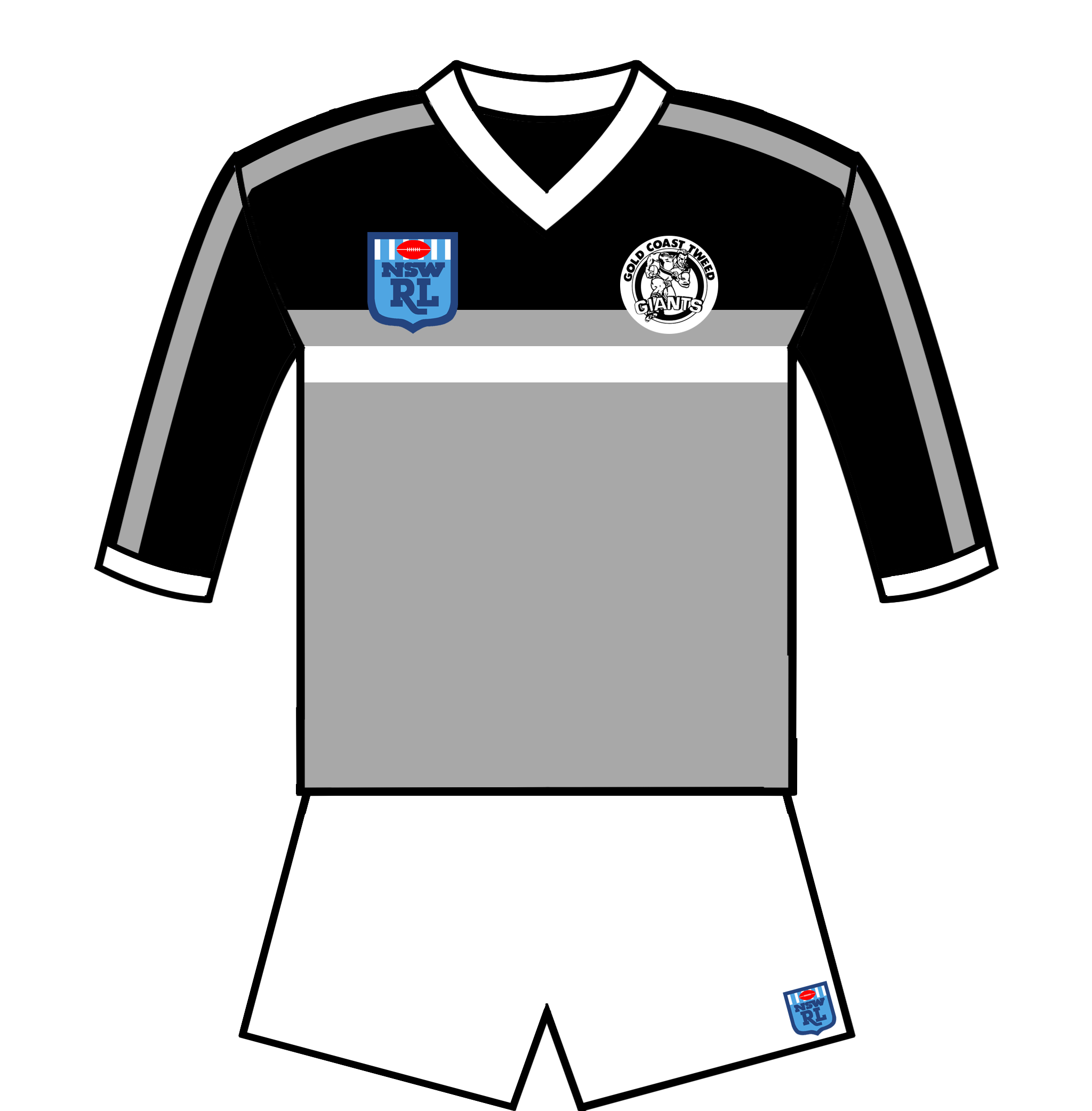
Gold Coast Giants 2nd season Ground: Seagulls Stadium; Coach: Bob McCarthy; Captain: Ron Gibbs → Billy Johnstone

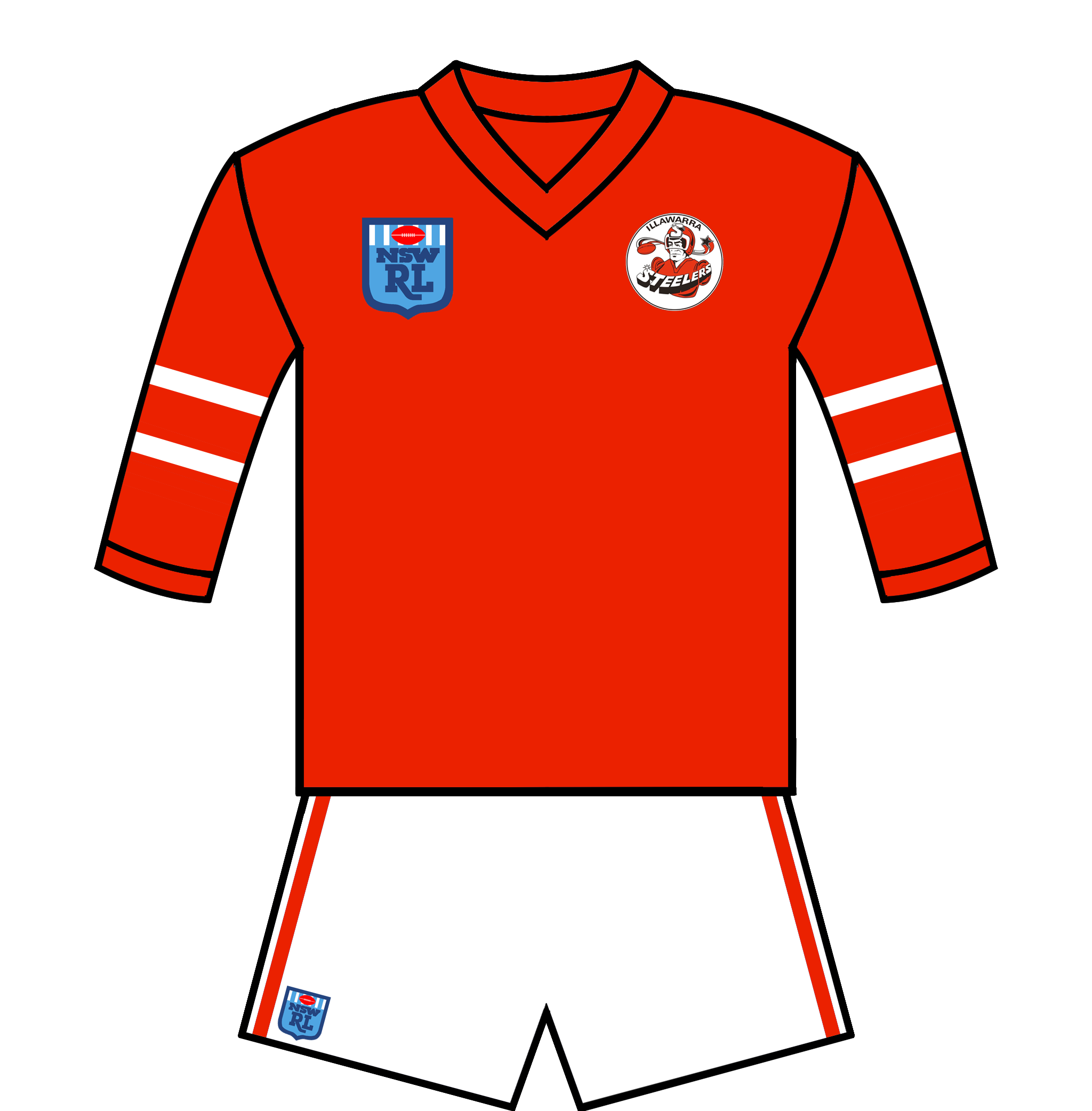
Illawarra 8th season Ground: Wollongong Stadium; Coach: Ron Hilditch; Captain: Chris Walsh

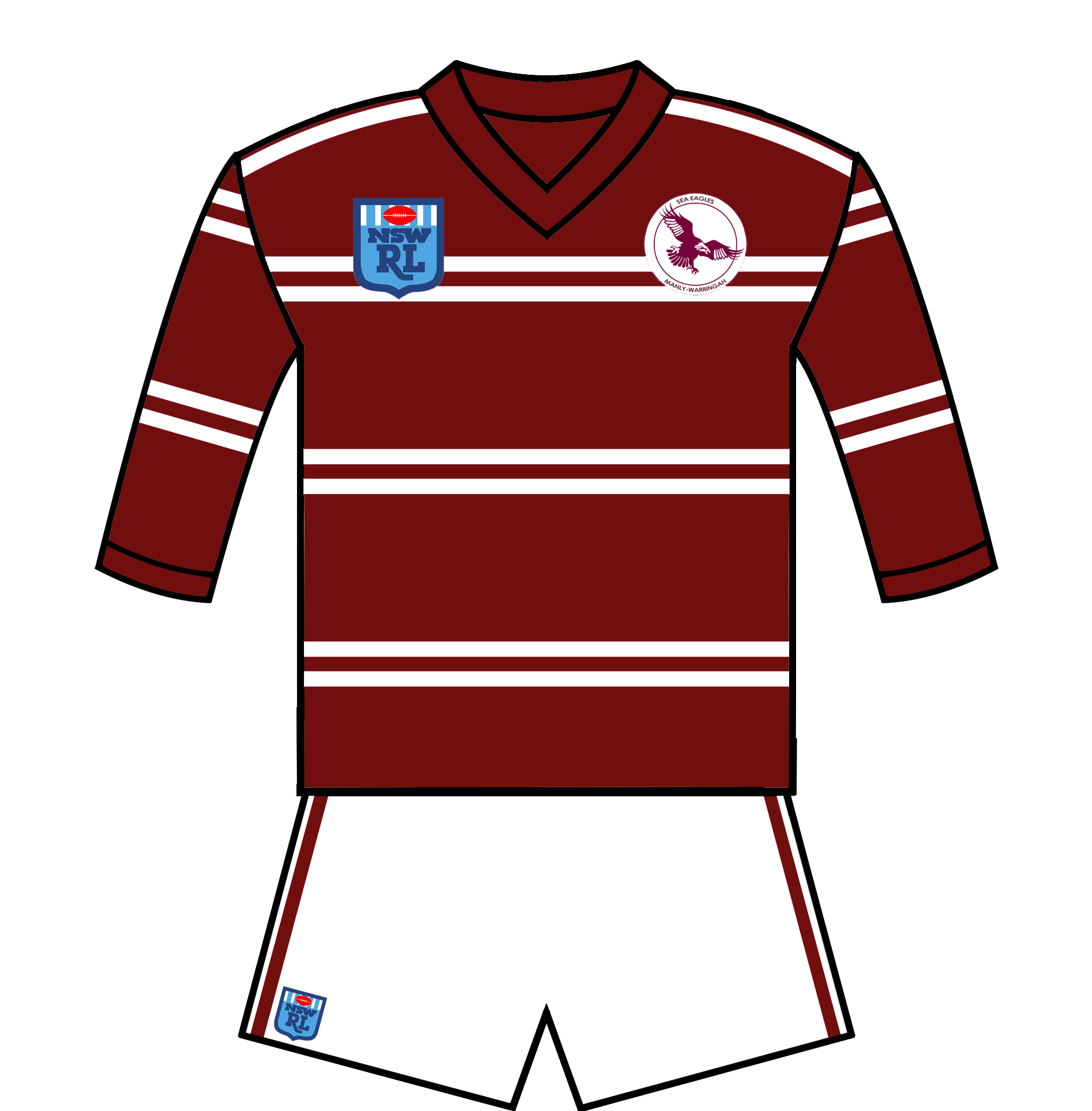
Manly-Warringah 43rd season Ground: Brookvale Oval; Coach: Alan Thompson; Captain: Paul Vautin

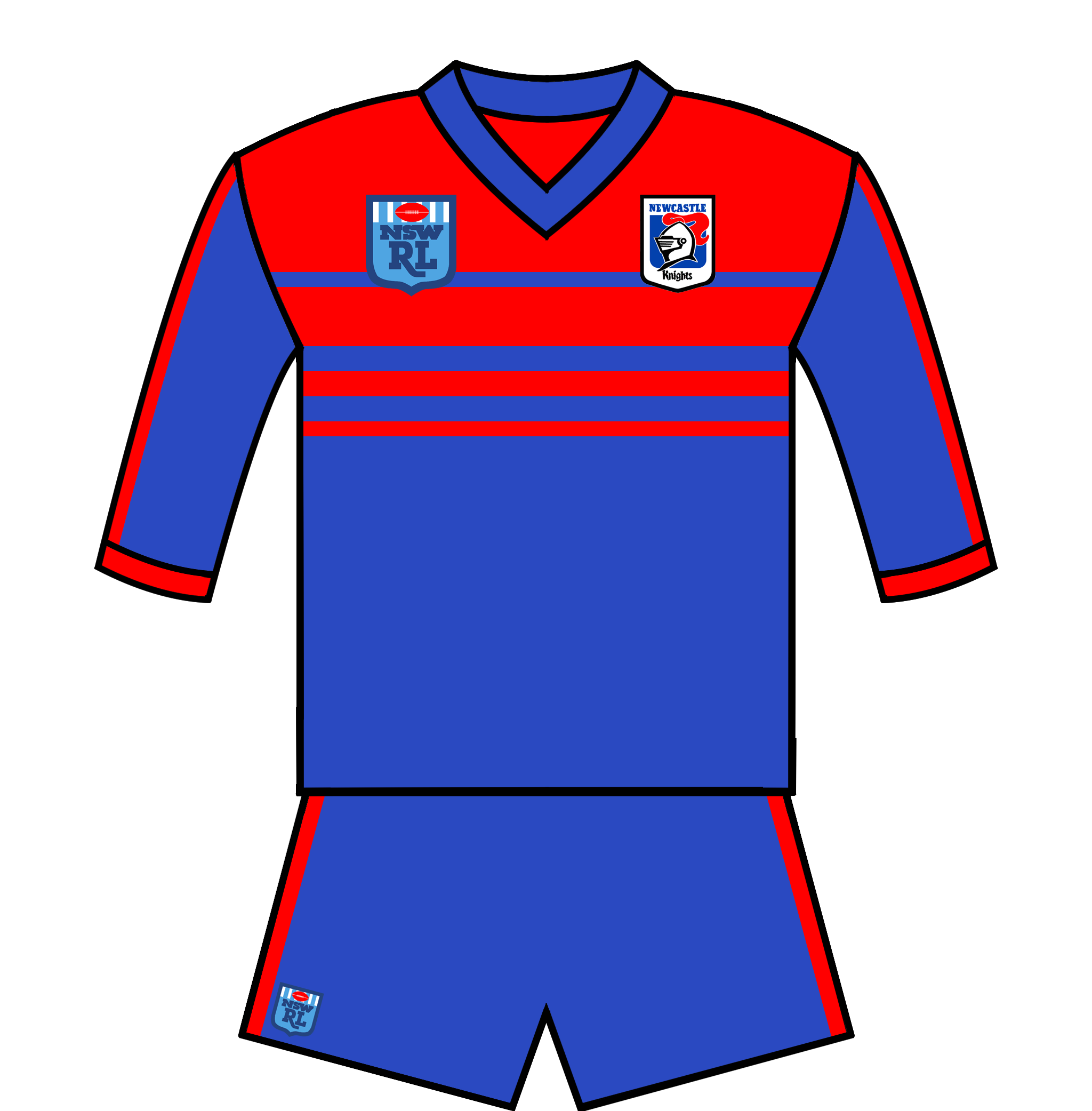
Newcastle 2nd season Ground: Newcastle ISC; Coach: Allan McMahon; Captain: Sam Stewart

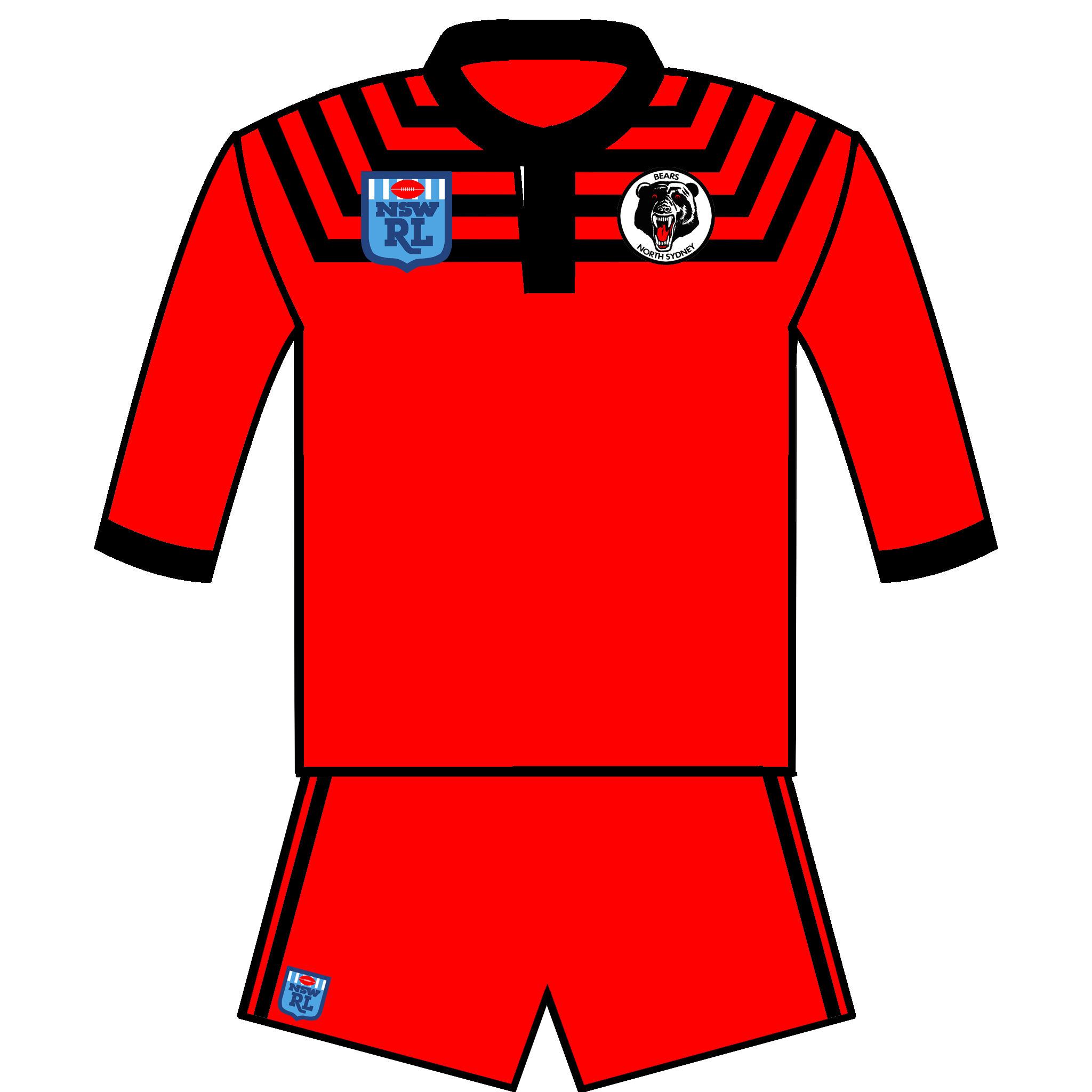
North Sydney 82nd season Ground: North Sydney Oval; Coach: Frank Stanton; Captain: John Dorahy → Tony Rea

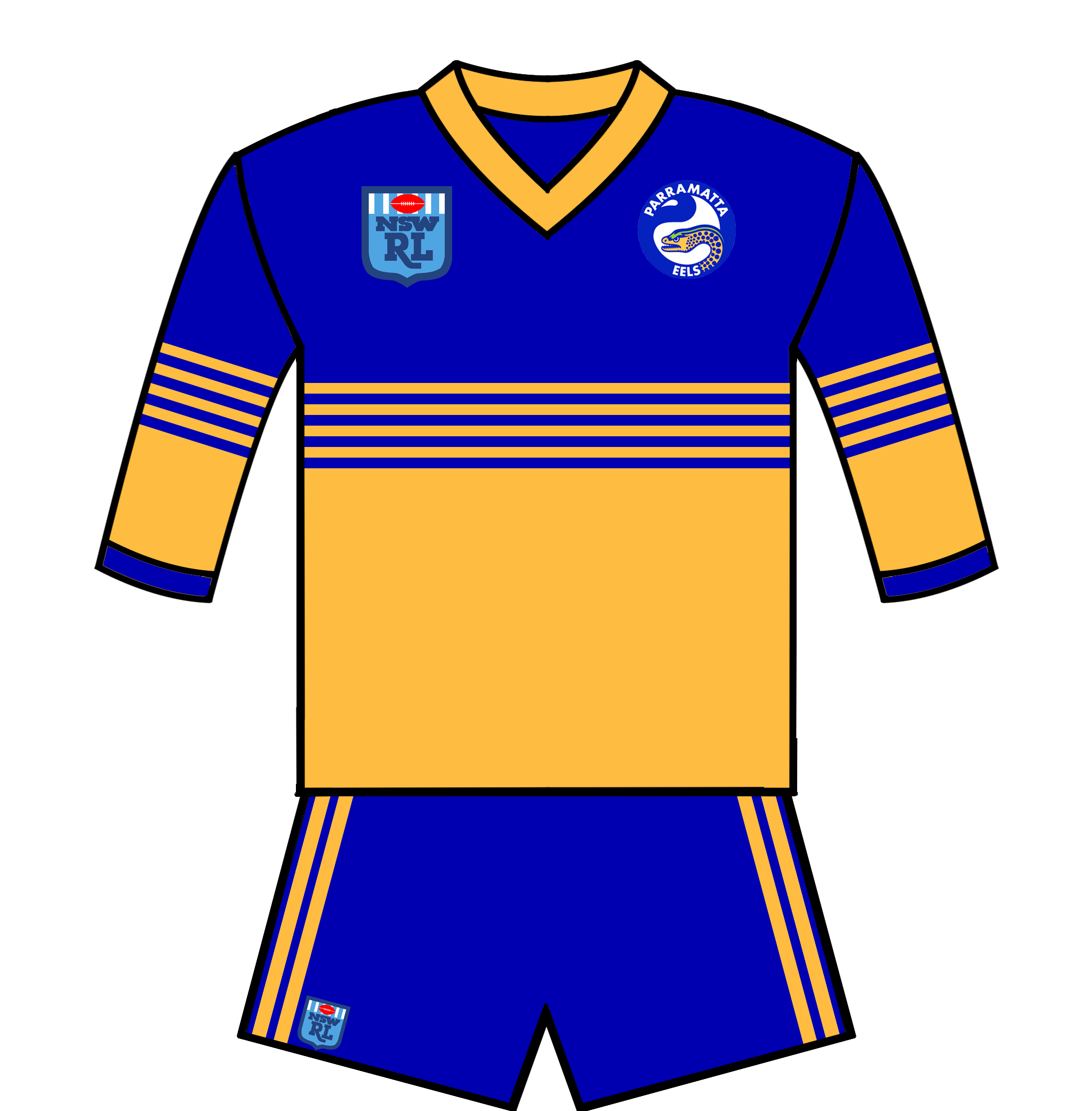
Parramatta 43rd season Ground: Parramatta Stadium; Coach: John Monie; Captain: Peter Sterling

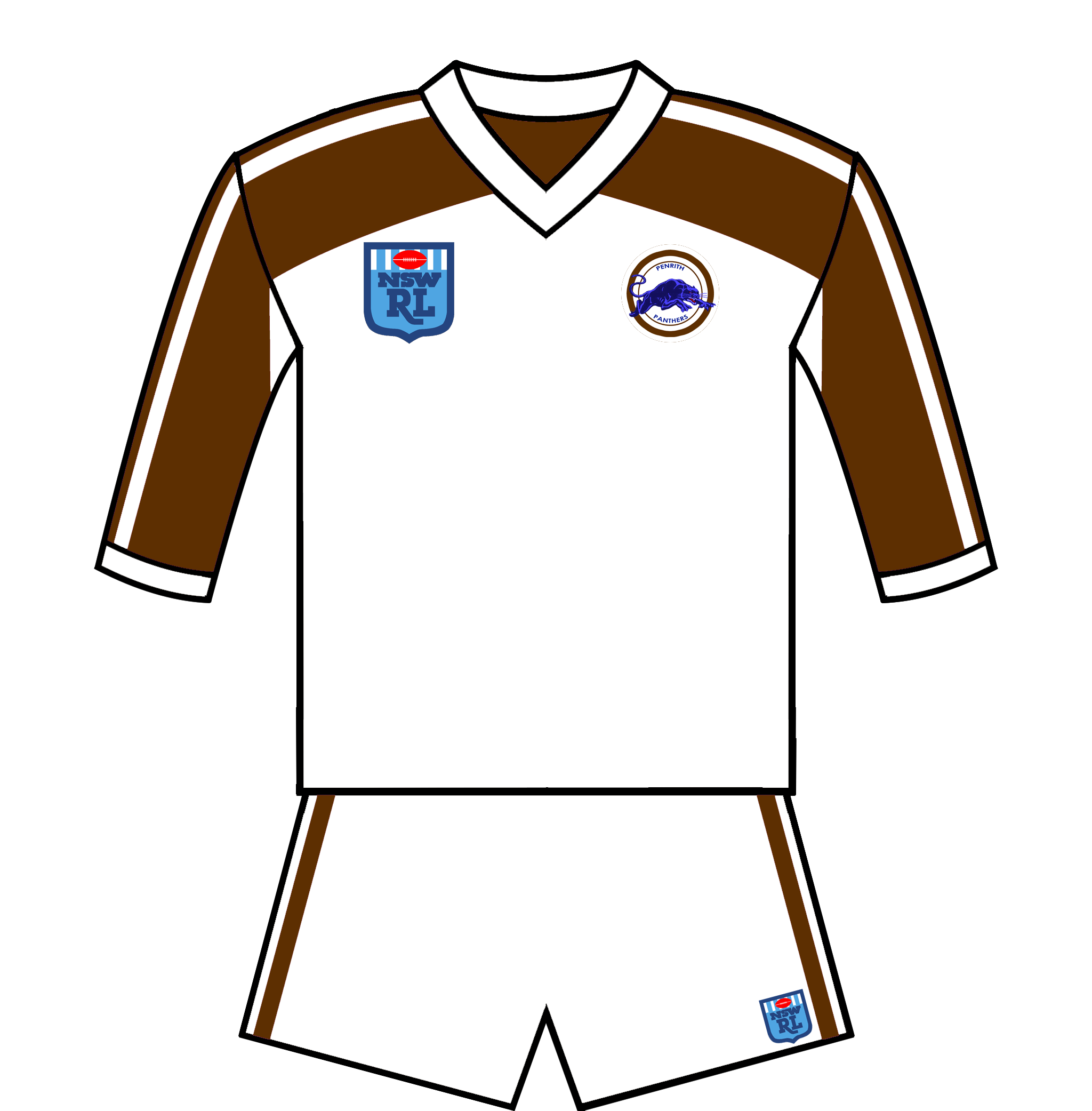
Penrith 23rd season Ground: Penrith Stadium; Coach: Ron Willey; Captain: Royce Simmons

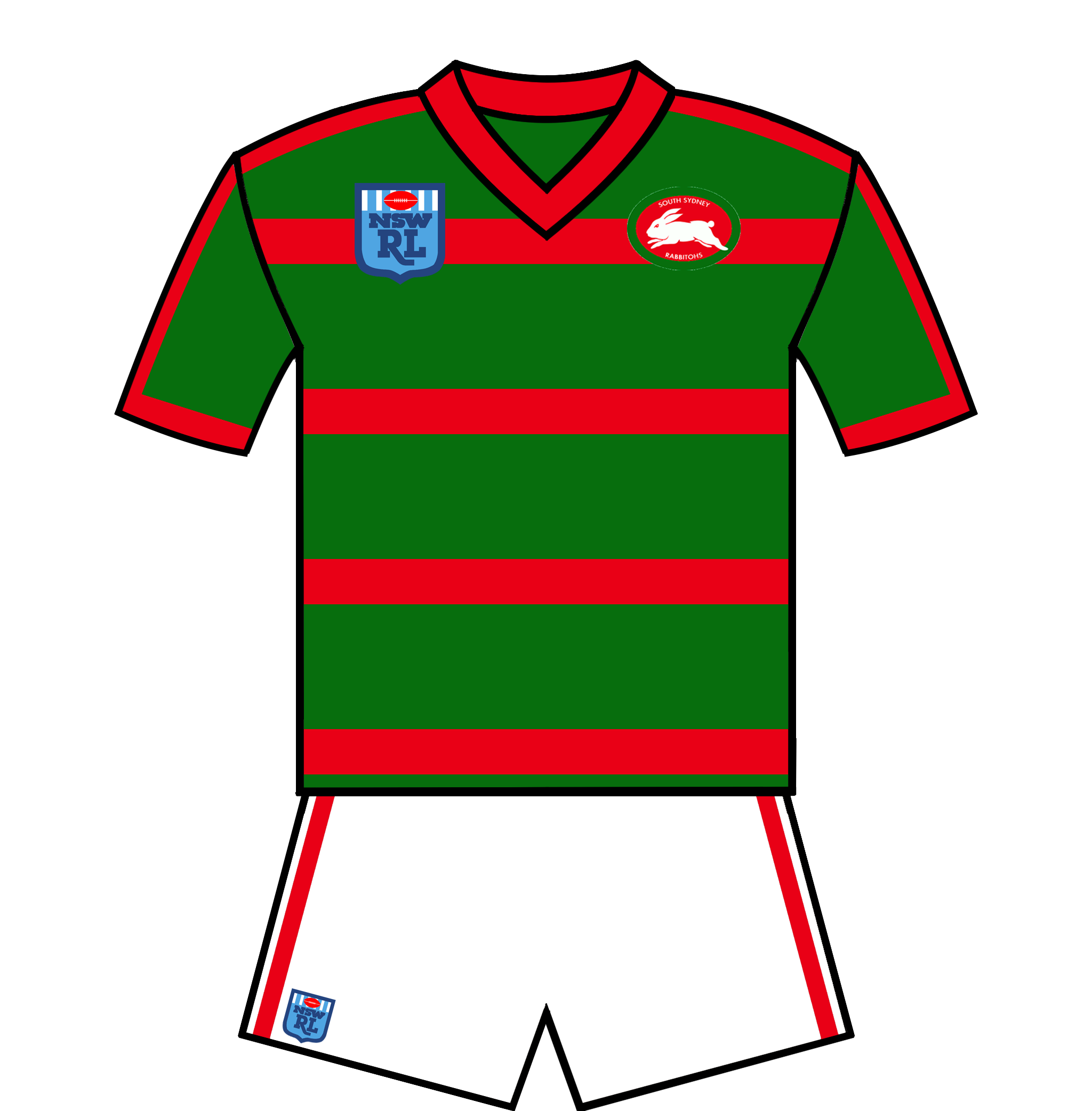
South Sydney 82nd season Ground: Sydney Football Stadium; Coach: George Piggins; Captain: Mario Fenech

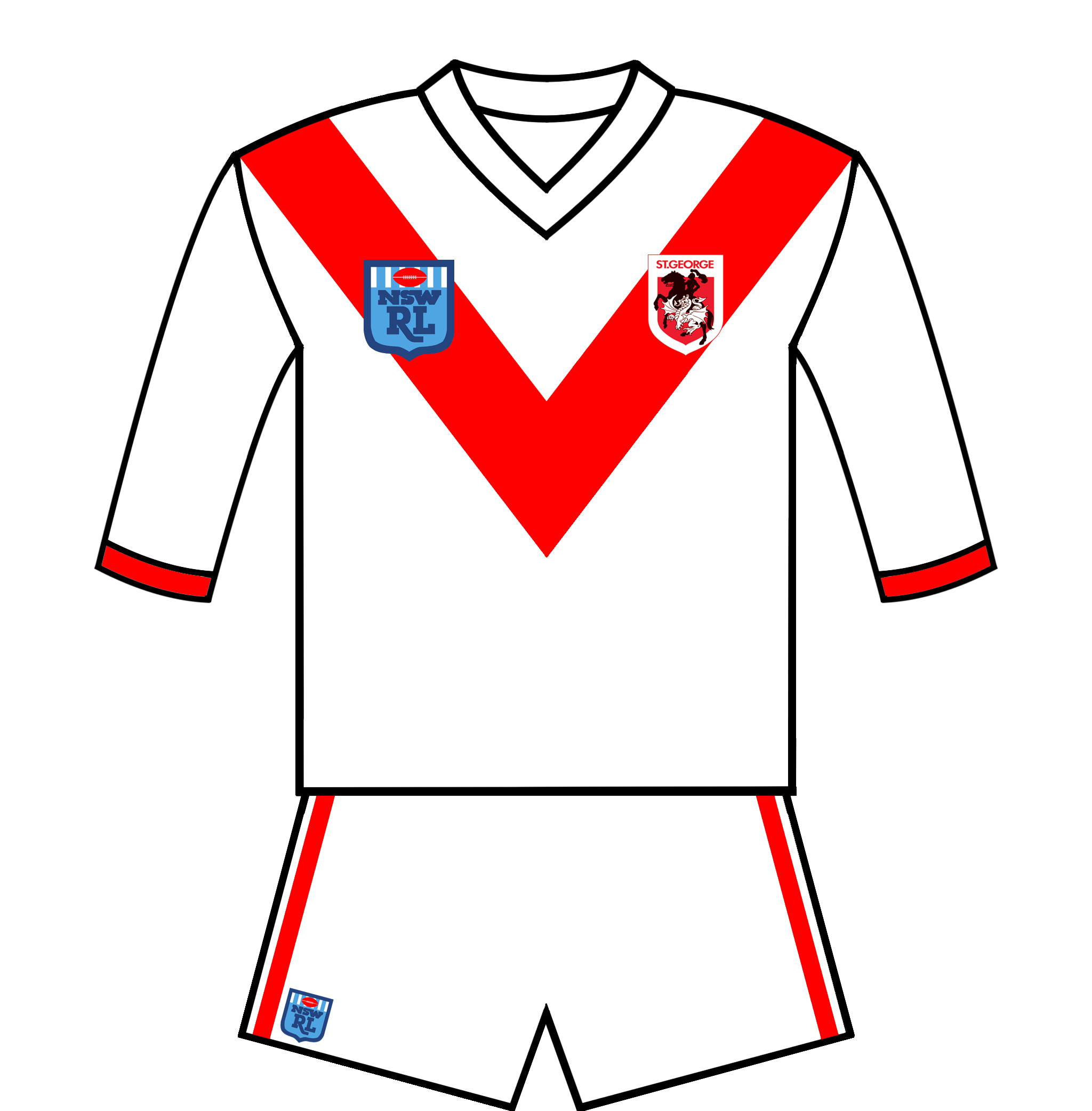
St. George 70th season Ground: Kogarah Oval; Coach: Craig Young; Captain: Brian Johnston

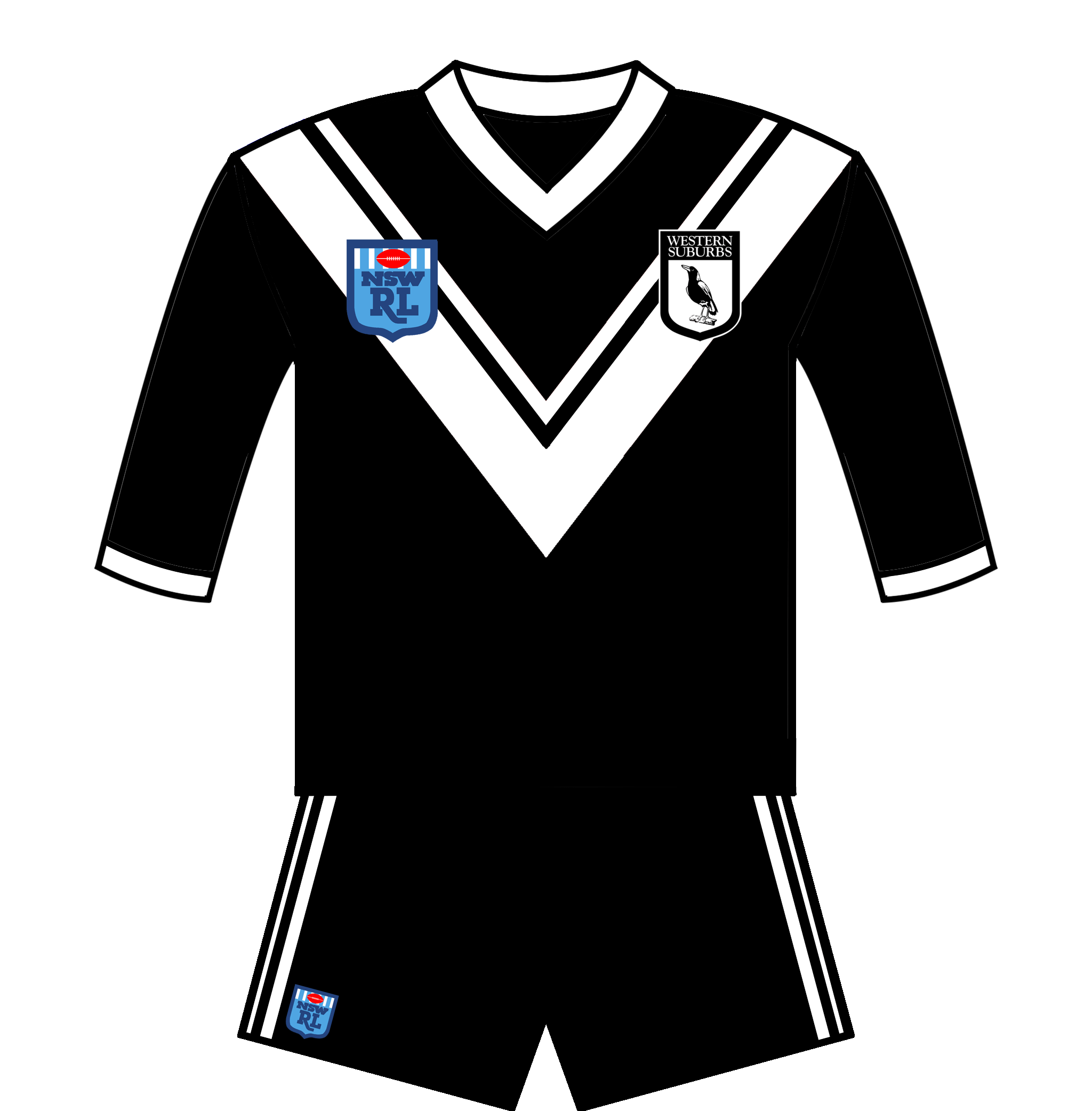
Western Suburbs 82nd season Ground: Orana Park; Coach: John Bailey; Captain: Cameron Blair → Ellery Hanley

=== Advertising ===
1989 was a watershed year for the New South Wales Rugby League's advertising commencing an association with Tina Turner that would last until 1995. In those years the NSWRL, its ad agency Hertz Walpole and promotions consultant Brian Walsh would fundamentally change the image and popular perception of the game in Australia.

Agency copywriter Paul Knights inspired by the brutal simplicity of the game, saw a link to the lyrics in Tina Turner's 1987 hit What You Get Is What You See written by Terry Britten & Graham Lyle. Negotiations were assisted by the fact that her Australian manager Roger Davies was familiar with the game and the rights deal was easily done. There was initially no intention to film Tina performing the song but at the last minute an availability appeared in her schedule. The agency and a production crew were despatched to England along with the NSWRL's General Manager John Quayle bearing bags of balls, jumpers and branded goalpost pads. Leading players Cliff Lyons (Manly) and Gavin Miller (Cronulla) were both in England at the time playing for Leeds and Hull Kingston Rovers respectively and made themselves available for the film and promotional stills shoot with Tina. In the finished ad the Tina footage is interspersed with the usual big hits and crowd scenes plus shots of the star players of the time in pre-season training. Lyons appears in the commercial in a hammy locker room shot with Tina.

Initial questions about the relevance of Tina to the Australian game were displaced when the up tempo, sexy ad appeared and the long running and successful association began.

== Regular season ==
Team	1	2	3	4	5	6	7	8	9	10	11	12	13	14	15	16	17	18	19	20	21	22	23	F1	F2	F3	F4	GF
Balmain Tigers	NOR +7	**NEW** **+2**	BRI +9	**PAR** **−2**	WES −2	**MAN** **+1**	PEN −20	**GCG** **+10**	CBY −6	X	STG −10	**ILA** **+12**	**SOU** **−2**	EAS +4	**CRO** **+22**	CAN +6	**NOR** **+32**	NEW −8	**BRI** **+18**	PAR +4	**WES** **+40**	MAN; 0	**PEN** **+27**	X	PEN +12	SOU +10	X	**CAN** **−5***
Brisbane Broncos	**PEN** **+20**	MAN +4	**BAL** **−9**	WES +2	**NEW** **+12**	PAR +4	NOR +26	**ILA** **+8**	EAS +34	X	**GCG** **+14**	STG −10	CAN −21	**CRO** **+32**	CBY −14	**SOU** **−12**	PEN −10	**MAN** **−8**	BAL −18	**WES** **+12**	NEW +4	**PAR** **+8**	**NOR** **+30**	CRO −24				
Canberra Raiders	CRO −18	**SOU** **−15**	EAS +1	**GCG** **+24**	**CBY** **+30**	**ILA** **+36**	**STG** **+38**	MAN +2	**PAR** **+25**	X	NEW −4	PEN −10	**BRI** **+21**	**WES** **−3**	NOR +9	**BAL** **−6**	**CRO** **−6**	SOU −10	**EAS** **+4**	GCG +24	CBY +4	**ILA** **+10**	STG +14	X	CRO +21	PEN +9	SOU +16	BAL +5*
Canterbury-Bankstown Bulldogs	GCG +6	**CRO** **+20**	ILA +12	**STG** **−8**	CAN −30	EAS +24	**SOU** **−8**	NEW −8	**BAL** **+6**	X	PEN −34	**PAR** **+14**	NOR; 0	MAN −18	**BRI** **+14**	**WES** **+20**	**GCG** **+6**	CRO −15	**ILA** **+10**	STG −32	**CAN** **−4**	**EAS** **−32**	SOU; 0					
Cronulla-Sutherland Sharks	**CAN** **+18**	CBY −20	**SOU** **−2**	**EAS** **+4**	STG −1	**GCG** **+2**	ILA +20	**PEN** **+22**	**NEW** **+26**	X	PAR −10	**NOR** **+14**	WES +16	BRI −32	BAL −22	**MAN** **+5**	CAN +6	**CBY** **+15**	SOU +2	EAS −18	**STG** **+14**	GCG −4	**ILA** **+32**	**BRI** **+24**	**CAN** **−21**			
Eastern Suburbs Roosters	**SOU** **+14**	STG +1	**CAN** **−1**	CRO −4	**ILA** **+42**	**CBY** **−24**	GCG −14	**PAR** **−4**	**BRI** **−34**	**WES** **+2**	X	MAN −10	PEN −20	**BAL** **−4**	NEW −10	NOR +6	**SOU** **−18**	**STG** **+4**	CAN −4	**CRO** **+18**	ILA; 0	CBY +32	**GCG** **+30**					
Gold Coast-Tweed Giants	**CBY** **−6**	**ILA** **+4**	X	CAN −24	**SOU** **−15**	CRO −2	**EAS** **+14**	BAL −10	**PEN** **−23**	STG −4	BRI −14	WES; 0	**NEW** **+6**	**NOR** **+2**	**MAN** **+23**	PAR −14	CBY −6	ILA +2	**STG** **−32**	**CAN** **−24**	SOU −11	**CRO** **+4**	EAS −30					
Illawarra Steelers	**STG** **−4**	GCG −4	**CBY** **−12**	SOU −8	EAS −42	CAN −36	**CRO** **−20**	BRI −8	**MAN** **+6**	**NOR** **−12**	X	BAL −12	PAR −16	**PEN** **−1**	WES −2	**NEW** **−12**	STG +2	**GCG** **−2**	CBY −10	**SOU** **−12**	**EAS**; **0**	CAN −10	CRO −32					
Manly Warringah Sea Eagles	PAR −2	**BRI** **−4**	NEW −14	**NOR** **+4**	**PEN** **−10**	BAL −1	**WES** **+12**	**CAN** **−2**	ILA −6	X	SOU −26	**EAS** **+10**	**STG** **+14**	**CBY** **+18**	GCG −23	CRO −5	**PAR** **+22**	BRI +8	**NEW** **+10**	NOR −2	PEN −18	**BAL**; **0**	WES +6					
Newcastle Knights	**WES** **+9**	BAL −2	**MAN** **+14**	PEN −9	BRI −12	**NOR** **+12**	PAR +4	**CBY** **+8**	CRO −26	X	**CAN** **+4**	SOU −8	GCG −6	**STG** **−8**	**EAS** **+10**	ILA +12	WES −18	**BAL** **+8**	MAN −10	**PEN** **−1**	**BRI** **−4**	NOR +13	**PAR** **+10**					
North Sydney Bears	**BAL** **−7**	PEN −20	**WES** **+24**	MAN −4	**PAR** **+16**	NEW −12	**BRI** **−26**	SOU −10	**STG** **+2**	ILA +12	X	CRO −14	**CBY**; **0**	GCG −2	**CAN** **−9**	**EAS** **−6**	BAL −32	**PEN** **−29**	WES −30	**MAN** **+2**	PAR −24	**NEW** **−13**	BRI −30					
Parramatta Eels	**MAN** **+2**	WES +20	**PEN** **+2**	BAL +2	NOR −16	**BRI** **−4**	**NEW** **−4**	EAS +4	CAN −25	X	**CRO** **+10**	CBY −14	**ILA** **+16**	**SOU** **−8**	STG +12	**GCG** **+14**	MAN −22	**WES** **−18**	PEN +7	**BAL** **−4**	**NOR** **+24**	BRI −8	NEW −10					
Penrith Panthers	BRI −20	**NOR** **+20**	PAR −2	**NEW** **+9**	MAN +10	**WES** **+26**	**BAL** **+20**	CRO −22	GCG +23	X	**CBY** **+34**	**CAN** **+10**	**EAS** **+20**	ILA +1	SOU +11	**STG** **−4**	**BRI** **+10**	NOR +29	**PAR** **−7**	NEW +1	**MAN** **+18**	WES +37	BAL −27	X	**BAL** **−12**	**CAN** **−9**		
South Sydney Rabbitohs	EAS −14	CAN +15	CRO +2	**ILA** **+8**	GCG +15	**STG** **+32**	CBY +8	**NOR** **+10**	WES +9	X	**MAN** **+26**	**NEW** **+8**	BAL +2	PAR +8	**PEN** **−11**	BRI +12	EAS +18	**CAN** **+10**	**CRO** **−2**	ILA +12	**GCG** **+11**	STG +4	**CBY**; **0**	X	X	**BAL** **−10**	**CAN** **−16**	
St. George Dragons	ILA +4	**EAS** **−1**	X	CBY +8	**CRO** **+1**	SOU −32	CAN −38	**WES** **−2**	NOR −2	**GCG** **+4**	**BAL** **+10**	**BRI** **+10**	MAN −14	NEW +8	**PAR** **−12**	PEN +4	**ILA** **−2**	EAS −4	GCG +32	**CBY** **+32**	CRO −14	**SOU** **−4**	**CAN** **−14**					
Western Suburbs Magpies	NEW −9	**PAR** **−20**	NOR −24	**BRI** **−2**	**BAL** **+2**	PEN −26	MAN −12	STG +2	**SOU** **−9**	EAS −2	X	**GCG**; **0**	**CRO** **−16**	CAN +3	**ILA** **+2**	CBY −20	**NEW** **+18**	PAR +18	**NOR** **+30**	BRI −12	BAL −40	**PEN** **−37**	**MAN** **−6**					
Team	1	2	3	4	5	6	7	8	9	10	11	12	13	14	15	16	17	18	19	20	21	22	23	F1	F2	F3	F4	GF

Bold – Home game
X – Bye
* – Extra time game
Opponent for round listed above margin

=== Ladder ===
	Team	Pld	W	D	L	PF	PA	PD	Pts
1	South Sydney	22	18	1	3	390	207	+183	37
2	Penrith	22	16	0	6	438	241	+197	32
3	Balmain	22	14	1	7	380	236	+144	29
4	**Canberra (P)**	22	14	0	8	457	287	+170	28
5	Brisbane	22	14	0	8	398	290	+108	28
6	Cronulla	22	14	0	8	368	281	+87	28
7	Newcastle	22	11	0	11	281	281	0	22
8	Parramatta	22	11	0	11	346	366	-20	22
9	Canterbury	22	10	2	10	280	337	-57	22
10	St. George	22	10	0	12	330	356	-26	20
11	Eastern Suburbs	22	9	1	12	348	346	+2	19
12	Manly	22	9	1	12	334	343	-9	19
13	Western Suburbs	22	7	1	14	229	389	-160	15
14	Gold Coast	22	7	1	14	223	383	-160	15
15	North Sydney	22	5	1	16	194	406	-212	11
16	Illawarra	22	2	1	19	256	503	-247	5

=== Ladder progression ===
- Numbers highlighted in green indicate that the team finished the round inside the top 5.
- Numbers highlighted in blue indicates the team finished first on the ladder in that round.
- Numbers highlighted in red indicates the team finished last place on the ladder in that round.
- Underlined numbers indicate that the team had a bye during that round.

	Team	1	2	3	4	5	6	7	8	9	10	11	12	13	14	15	16	17	18	19	20	21	22	23
1	South Sydney Rabbitohs	0	2	4	6	8	10	12	14	16	16	18	20	22	24	24	26	28	30	30	32	34	36	37
2	Penrith Panthers	0	2	2	4	6	8	10	10	12	12	14	16	18	20	22	22	24	26	26	28	30	32	32
3	Balmain Tigers	2	4	6	6	6	8	8	10	10	10	10	12	12	14	16	18	20	20	22	24	26	27	29
4	Canberra Raiders	0	0	2	4	6	8	10	12	14	14	14	14	16	16	18	18	18	18	20	22	24	26	28
5	Brisbane Broncos	2	4	4	6	8	10	12	14	16	16	18	18	18	20	20	20	20	20	20	22	24	26	28
6	Cronulla-Sutherland Sharks	2	2	2	4	4	6	8	10	12	12	12	14	16	16	16	18	20	22	24	24	26	26	28
7	Newcastle Knights	2	2	4	4	4	6	8	10	10	10	12	12	12	12	14	16	16	18	18	18	18	20	22
8	Parramatta Eels	2	4	6	8	8	8	8	10	10	10	12	12	14	14	16	18	18	18	20	20	22	22	22
9	Canterbury-Bankstown Bulldogs	2	4	6	6	6	8	8	8	10	10	10	12	13	13	15	17	19	19	21	21	21	21	22
10	St. George Dragons	2	2	2	4	6	6	6	6	6	8	10	12	12	14	14	16	16	16	18	20	20	20	20
11	Eastern Suburbs Roosters	2	4	4	4	6	6	6	6	6	8	8	8	8	8	8	10	10	12	12	14	15	17	19
12	Manly Warringah Sea Eagles	0	0	0	2	2	2	4	4	4	4	4	6	8	10	10	10	12	14	16	16	16	17	19
13	Western Suburbs Magpies	0	0	0	0	2	2	2	4	4	4	4	5	5	7	9	9	11	13	15	15	15	15	15
14	Gold Coast-Tweed Giants	0	2	2	2	2	2	4	4	4	4	4	5	7	9	11	11	11	13	13	13	13	15	15
15	North Sydney Bears	0	0	2	2	4	4	4	4	6	8	8	8	9	9	9	9	9	9	9	11	11	11	11
16	Illawarra Steelers	0	0	0	0	0	0	0	0	2	2	2	2	2	2	2	2	4	4	4	4	5	5	5

== Finals ==
Cronulla and Brisbane, having finished equal fifth, played off for a semi-final berth. Cronulla would secure fifth position via a dominant display in a midweek clash on neutral turf at the recently constructed Parramatta Stadium.

Despite being on fourth place on the ladder, Canberra went on to win the competition, the first club to do so since the top five system's introduction. They won their last nine games of the season. Canberra's win also saw them become the first non-Sydney based club to win the premiership.

Home	Score	Away	Match information
Home	Score	Away	Date and time	Venue	Referee	Crowd
Playoff
Brisbane	14–38	Cronulla-Sutherland	29 August 1989	Parramatta Stadium	Mick Stone	9,047
Qualifying Finals
Canberra	31–10	Cronulla-Sutherland	2 September 1989	Sydney Football Stadium	Bill Harrigan	18,186
Penrith	12–24	Balmain	3 September 1989	Sydney Football Stadium	Mick Stone	29,508
Semi-finals
Penrith	18–27	Canberra	9 September 1989	Sydney Football Stadium	Mick Stone	20,314
South Sydney	10–20	Balmain	10 September 1989	Sydney Football Stadium	Bill Harrigan	40,000
Preliminary final
South Sydney	16–32	Canberra	17 September 1989	Sydney Football Stadium	Bill Harrigan	31,469
Grand final
Balmain	14–19	Canberra	24 September 1989	Sydney Football Stadium	Bill Harrigan	40,500

=== Chart ===
Qualifying final
2	Penrith	12
3	Balmain	24
4	Canberra	31
5	Cronulla-Sutherland	10

Major semi-final
1	South Sydney	10
Balmain	20
Minor semi-final
Penrith	18
Canberra	27

Preliminary final
South Sydney	16
Canberra	32

Grand final
Balmain	14
Canberra	19

=== Grand final ===
Balmain	Position	Canberra
1. Garry Jack	FB	1. Gary Belcher
2. Steve O'Brien	WG	2. Matthew Wood
3. Tim Brasher	CE	3. Mal Meninga (c)
4. Andy Currier	CE	4. Laurie Daley
5. James Grant	WG	5. John Ferguson
6. Mick Neil	FE	6. Chris O'Sullivan
7. Gary Freeman	HB	7. Ricky Stuart
8. Steve Roach	PR	8. Brent Todd
9. Benny Elias	HK	9. Steve Walters
10. Steve Edmed	PR	10. Glenn Lazarus
11. Paul Sironen	SR	11. Dean Lance
12. Bruce McGuire	SR	12. Gary Coyne
13. Wayne Pearce (c)	LK	13. Bradley Clyde
14. Michael Pobjie	Bench	15. Paul Martin
15. Shaun Edwards	Bench	20. Steve Jackson
16. Kevin Hardwick	Bench	22. Kevin Walters
Warren Ryan	Coach	Tim Sheens

For only the second time ever, the grand final was not an all-Sydney affair. A number of rugby league writers have referred to the 1989 grand final as the greatest ever; Canberra, who were beaten grand finalists in 1987, had won five games straight in order to make the finals, and in the finals accounted for Cronulla, an emerging Penrith team, and minor premiers South Sydney to qualify for their second grand final, though any loss would have eliminated the side from contention.

Canberra captain Mal Meninga had to overcome a broken arm from earlier in the season and played in a special cast. Also playing for the Raiders were future representative stars Laurie Daley, Bradley Clyde, Ricky Stuart, Steve Walters and his younger brother Kevin and Glenn Lazarus, as well as established stars Gary Belcher, Brent Todd and John "Chicka" Ferguson. Canberra were coached by Tim Sheens.

Their opponents Balmain, beaten grand finalists in 1988, boasted a Test-strength pack including Steve "Blocker" Roach, Paul Sironen, Ben Elias, Bruce McGuire, and inspirational captain Wayne "Junior" Pearce, as well as a backline that included Garry Jack, goalkicking English import Andy Currier, New Zealand halfback Gary Freeman, former Wallaby rugby union winger James Grant, and schoolboy sensation Tim Brasher, were favourites to win. The Tigers were again coached by former Canterbury-Bankstown dual premiership winning coach Warren Ryan.

The pre-match entertainment was provided by Marc Hunter, Debra Byrne, Michael Edward Stevens, boy soprano Ben Hawks & John Williamson.

Balmain led 12–2 at half time, having scored two tries against the run of play. The first came after an intercept by winger James Grant, snatching an offload from Raiders prop Brent Todd. The second was a great team effort with Paul Sironen steaming over under the posts after lead-up work from Andy Currier and Grant, all starting from a kick ahead by Currier after he had received a perfect offload from Steve Roach.

Canberra had looked marginally the better side in the first half and coach Tim Sheens spoke effectively to his players at the break, stressing that they could be considered unlucky to be trailing. Fifteen minutes into the second half referee Bill Harrigan controversially ruled against Balmain second-rower Bruce McGuire for using offside Raider Steve Walters as a shepherd. From the ensuing penalty the Raiders kicked for touch and "Chicka" Ferguson set up the Raiders' first try when he escaped an attempted tackle by Currier, passed to Belcher, who also beat Currier to score. The gap was narrowed to 12–8.

Twice in the last twenty minutes Balmain nearly wrapped up the match. Michael Neil was ankle-tapped five metres from the line in a desperate dive by Mal Meninga. Then the Tigers' captain Wayne Pearce lost the ball with the line wide open and centre Tim Brasher unmarked.

Warren Ryan's decisions with fifteen minutes left to replace the enforcer Roach with defender Kevin Hardwick may have been the turning point in the game. Ryan effectively set out to defend a six-point lead, a tactic which ultimately backfired. Benny Elias' field goal attempt hit the cross bar, after he'd earlier had one charged down by Meninga. However, with 90 seconds to go and it seemingly all over for the Raiders, the evergreen Ferguson scored the try of his life. Chris O'Sullivan sent up a searching bomb, Laurie Daley was there to palm the ball to Ferguson who stepped back inside past three converging defenders to score close to the posts, enabling an easy conversion for Meninga to level.

With Canberra's confidence mounting, the game became the first grand final since 1977 to go into same-day extra time. At this point the Sironen/Roach replacements became crucial with neither able to resume the field for the extra period.

Garry Jack knocked on two minutes into extra time and from the scrum Canberra's five-eighth Chris O'Sullivan kicked a field goal. Minutes from the finish, Raiders replacement Steve Jackson received the ball fifteen metres from the line and made for the tryline, beating two men and then carrying a further three with him. As he was being brought down he reached out to place the ball one-handed on the line.

It was Canberra's first ever premiership; the first grand final won by an out-of-Sydney club; and the first team to win from 4th position. Canberra's nineteen-year-old lock Bradley Clyde was a deserved Clive Churchill Medal winner as the man of the match, though most agreed that a number of Raiders could have won the medal, including fullback Gary Belcher.

Such was the drama of the match that an account of it was written by Thomas Keneally entitled "A movie script that came to life". This memorable match is now commemorated each year with the 1989 League Legends Cup.

24 September 1989

Balmain Tigers	14 – 19	Canberra Raiders
Tries: James Grant 1 Paul Sironen 1 Goals: Andy Currier 3/4; Field Goals: Ben Elias 0/2	1st: 12 - 2; 2nd: 2 - 12 e.t. 1: 0 - 1 e.t. 2: 0 - 4 Report	Tries: Gary Belcher 1 John Ferguson 1 Steve Jackson 1 Goals: Mal Meninga 3/6; Field Goals: Chris O'Sullivan 1/1; Ricky Stuart 0/2

Sydney Football Stadium
Attendance: 40,500
Referee: Bill Harrigan
Clive Churchill Medal: Bradley Clyde

== World Club Challenge ==
On 4 October, Canberra played British champions Widnes in the 1989 World Club Challenge at Old Trafford, Manchester. The Raiders lost 18 to 30 in front of 30,768 people.

== Player statistics ==
The following statistics are as of the conclusion of Round 22.

Top 5 point scorers

Points	Player	Tries	Goals	Field goals
146	Ricky Walford	13	47	0
120	Andy Currier	9	42	0
117	Neil Baker	6	43	7
110	Laurie Daley	14	27	0
101	Alan Wilson	10	30	1

Top 5 try scorers

Tries	Player
15	Greg Alexander
14	Laurie Daley
13	Gary Belcher
13	Ricky Walford
12	Phil Blake
12	Alan McIndoe
12	Andrew Simons
12	Andrew Ettingshausen

Top 5 goal scorers

Goals	Player
47	Ricky Walford
43	Neil Baker
42	Andy Currier
40	Mark Ellison
40	Terry Matterson
40	Andrew Leeds
