= Craig Wilson (rugby league) =

Australian rugby league footballer (b.1969)

Personal information
- Born: 21 September 1969 (age 55); Cronulla, New South Wales, Australia

Playing information
- Position: Second-row, Lock
Club
Years	Team	Pld	T	G	FG	P
1991–96	North Sydney Bears	106	19	0	3	55
1997	Sth Qld Crushers	20	3	0	3	15
1998	Illawarra Steelers	24	3	0	1	13
1999	Gateshead Thunder	28	5	0	1	21
2000	Hull FC	22	1	0	0	4
	Total	200	31	0	8	108
- Father: Graham Wilson
- Relatives: Alan Wilson (brother); Kevin Hogan (uncle)

Craig Wilson (born 21 September 1969) is an Australian former rugby league footballer. The son of Australian Kangaroos player, Graham Wilson, and brother of ex-Cronulla player Alan Wilson, he is a former member of the North Sydney Bears team. Wilson also played for South Queensland Crushers and Illawarra Steelers before playing two seasons in the English Super League.

== Playing career ==
Wilson made his first grade debut for North Sydney in round 11 of the 1991 NSWRL season against Cronulla in a 19–10 victory. It wouldn't be until the 1993 NSWRL season where Wilson started to cement himself into first grade. Wilson played with Norths up until the 1996 season suffering preliminary final heartbreak along the way in 1994 and 1996. In total, Wilson played 106 games for Norths. In 1997, Wilson made the move to South Queensland before moving to the Illawarra Steelers for the 1998 season where he played 24 games for the South Coast club. In 1999, Wilson played for Gateshead Thunder in the English Super League. In 2000, Wilson played one final year, this time with Hull FC before retiring.
