= Graham Wilson (rugby league) =

Australia & South Africa international rugby league footballer

Personal information
- Full name: Graham Alan Wilson
- Born: 24 June 1939 Grafton, New South Wales, Australia
- Died: 20 December 2005 (aged 66) Sydney, New South Wales, Australia

Playing information
- Position: Forward
Club
Years	Team	Pld	T	G	FG	P
1960–67	Newtown	128	11	15	0	63
1968–70	Cronulla-Sutherland	37	2	0	0	6
	Total	165	13	15	0	69
Representative
Years	Team	Pld	T	G	FG	P
1961–66	NSW City	4	0	0	0	0
1963–66	New South Wales	4	2	0	0	6
1963	South Africa
1963–64	Australia	2	1	0	0	3
- Relatives: Alan Wilson (son); Craig Wilson (son); Kevin Hogan (brother-in-law)

Graham Wilson (1939–2005) was an Australian rugby league footballer who played in the 1960s and 1970s. He played in the New South Wales Rugby Football League premiership for Newtown club and later Cronulla-Sutherland, also achieving state and international representative honours. He is also the father of former North Sydney Bears player Craig Wilson, and Cronulla-Sutherland player Alan Wilson.

== Playing career ==
Originally from Grafton, New South Wales, Wilson made his first grade debut for Newtown in the Sydney premiership as a 16-year-old in 1960. He was first selected to represent New South Wales the following season.

In 1963, the South African team was touring Australia and Wilson represented Sydney against them. Before leaving for New Zealand, the South African team invited Wilson and Canterbury-Bankstown's hooker, Fred Anderson to bolster their injury-ravaged forward pack. Later that year Wilson was selected for the Australia national team for the 1963–64 Kangaroo tour of Great Britain and France, gaining the unusual distinction of playing for two countries in the same year. On tour he played at second-row forward in the third test against France.

== Death ==
Wilson died in December 2005 in Sydney, aged 66.

== Accolades ==
In 2008, the centenary year of rugby league in Australia, Wilson was named in the Newtown 18-man team of the century.
