= 1986 Cronulla-Sutherland Sharks season =

- NSWRL rank: 10th
- 1986 record: Wins: 9; draws: 1; losses: 14
- Points scored: For: 310 (53 tries, 49 goals); against: 464 (77 tries, 75 goals, 6 field goals)

Team information
- Coach: Jack Gibson
- Captain: David Hatch
- Stadium: Ronson Field
- Avg. attendance: 6,062

Top scorers
- Tries: Andrew Ettingshausen (9)
- Goals: Sean Watson (19)
- Points: Sean Watson (54)
← 1985	1987 →

The 1986 Cronulla-Sutherland Sharks season was the 20th in the club's history. They competed in the NSWRL's 1986 Winfield Cup premiership as well as the 1986 National Panasonic Cup.

== Ladder ==
	Team	Pld	W	D	L	B	PF	PA	PD	Pts
1	Parramatta	24	16	1	7	2	446	280	+166	37
2	South Sydney	24	15	2	7	2	353	318	+35	36
3	Canterbury	24	15	1	8	2	428	264	+164	35
4	Manly	24	14	1	9	2	476	379	+97	33
5	Balmain	24	13	0	11	2	403	387	+16	30
6	North Sydney	24	13	0	11	2	362	416	-54	30
7	St. George	24	12	1	11	2	360	402	-42	29
8	Penrith	24	11	1	12	2	446	394	+52	27
9	Eastern Suburbs	24	10	0	14	2	334	364	-30	24
10	Cronulla	24	9	1	14	2	310	464	-154	23
11	Canberra	24	8	1	15	2	391	413	-22	21
12	Western Suburbs	24	8	1	15	2	372	538	-166	21
13	Illawarra	24	7	0	17	2	310	372	-62	18
