= Glenn Coleman (rugby league) =

Australian rugby league footballer

Personal information
- Full name: Glenn Robert Coleman
- Born: 21 December 1965 (age 60) Bankstown, New South Wales, Australia

Playing information
- Height: 174 cm (5 ft 9 in)
- Weight: 75 kg (11 st 11 lb)
- Position: Wing
Club
Years	Team	Pld	T	G	FG	P
1983–94	Cronulla Sharks	123	41	0	0	164

Glenn Coleman (born 21 December 1965) is an Australian former rugby league footballer who played in the 1980s and 1990s. He played his entire club football career with the Cronulla-Sutherland Sharks. He primarily played on the wing

== Early life ==
Coleman was born in the south-western Sydney suburb of Bankstown. He began his career playing for his local junior side Cronulla Caringbah at the age of sixteen. He was subsequently scouted and signed as a junior to the Cronulla-Sutherland Sharks.

== Playing career ==
Cronulla coach Jack Gibson gave Coleman his first grade debut against the Illawarra Steelers in round 22 of the 1986 NSWRL season. In 1987, Coleman finished the season as the Sharks' top try scorer with 10 tries. In the 1988 NSWRL season, the Sharks won the minor premiership for the first time in the club's history, Coleman played a starring role in his sides' success, playing in all 24 games, and scoring 8 tries. The Sharks narrowly missed out on Grand Final qualification that year when they lost 9–2 in the preliminary final to the Balmain Tigers at the Sydney Football Stadium.

In the 1989 NSWRL season, the Sharks finished fifth after surviving a playoff for fifth with the Brisbane Broncos. Coleman once again played in all 24 games, and scored 6 tries in the 1989 season. Injuries in the 1990 and 1991 seasons prevented him from making much of an impact, but Coleman returned to top form in the 1992 NSWRL season when he scored 8 tries from 21 appearances. Coleman's stint with the Sharks ended at the conclusion of the 1994 NSWRL season and subsequently retired from playing.

== Post playing ==
After the 2005 Cronulla riots, Coleman was selected along with fellow sports stars Susie Maroney, Nick Davis, Mark Ella and former Sharks teammate Andrew Ettingshausen to head the $250,000 NSW government campaign to promote Sydney's beach suburbs as safe for everyone. In 2006, Coleman narrowly missed out on selection in the Cronulla Dream Team. Mat Rogers and Ray Corcoran were instead chosen as the wingers. Coleman was invited onto the board of Cronulla as a director in late 2012. This eventually turned into the chairman role during the high-pressure ASADA investigation at the club. Time and business commitments saw this being a fill-in role only to mid 2013. He was subsequently replaced by former Olympic basketballer Damian Keogh. Coleman now has a successful digital printing company Coleman Group as well as being a property developer. Coleman Group has been designing, printing and installing signage for over 60 years. As a leading manufacturer and supplier to the exhibition, event, retail and sporting industries
