= James Grant (rugby) =

Australia international rugby union & league footballer (born 1964)

Personal information
- Full name: James C. Grant
- Born: 22 May 1964 (age 62) Canowindra, Australia

Playing information

Rugby union
Representative
Years	Team	Pld	T	G	FG	P
1984–88	New South Wales	15
1988	Australia	5

Rugby league
- Position: Wing, Centre
Club
Years	Team	Pld	T	G	FG	P
1989–92	Balmain Tigers	65	30	3	0	126
1992–94	Hull FC	59	28	0	0	112
1995	Western Reds	9	0	0	0	0
	Total	133	58	3	0	238

James Grant (born 22 May 1964) is an Australian rugby footballer who played international rugby union and played rugby league professionally in England and Australia.

== Early years ==
Grant attended Canowindra Central School and St Stanislaus' College in Bathurst where he made the school's First XV.

== Playing career ==
=== Rugby Union ===
He joined the Orange City rugby union club in 1983. He represented New South Wales Country before moving to Kiama in 1984 for two seasons where he represented Illawarra, NSW County and New South Wales. He returned to Orange in 1986 and played for NSW. In 1987 he played for the Gordon club in Sydney. He again returned to Orange in 1988 and made both the NSW and Australian sides.

=== Rugby League ===
Grant switched to rugby league in 1989, joining the Balmain Tigers in the NSWRL Premiership. He was part of the Tigers side that played in the grand final that season and stayed with the club until 1992. He had found it difficult to maintain his first grade place with the Tigers and moved to Hull FC for the 1992/93 season.
