= 1989 League Legends Cup =

Annual rugby league match in Australia

- Teams: Canberra Raiders; Wests Tigers
- First meeting: 13 April 2008
- Latest meeting: Wests Tigers
- Next meeting: 2011

Statistics
- Total meetings: 3
- Most wins: Wests Tigers (2)
- Largest victory: 13 - Raiders 22-35 Tigers (4 April 2010)

The 1989 League Legends Cup is an annual rugby league match between NRL clubs the Canberra Raiders and the Wests Tigers. The match is played to commemorate the 1989 Grand Final, which has been called the greatest Grand Final ever. The grand final was actually between the Raiders and the Balmain Tigers, but since the Tigers merged with the Western Suburbs Magpies in 2000, the 1989 League Legend Cup match is played between the Raiders and the joint venture. The cup is contested only once per season, so in the years where the Raiders and Tigers are scheduled to meet twice, the clubs decide which of those two matches will decide the winner of the trophy. The first Cup match was in Round 5 of the 2008 NRL season.

== Games Played ==
Home	Score	Away	Match Information
Home	Score	Away	Date and Time	Venue	Referee(s)	Crowd
Canberra Raiders	30-24	Wests Tigers	13 April 2008, 2:00pm	Canberra Stadium	Sean Hampstead	12,240
Wests Tigers	34-26	Canberra Raiders	16 March 2009, 7:00pm	Campbelltown Stadium	Jared Maxwell; Gerard Sutton	17,392
Canberra Raiders	22-35	Wests Tigers	4 April 2010, 3:00pm	Canberra Stadium	Shayne Hayne; Brett Suttor	17,112
Wests Tigers	34-24	Canberra Raiders	26 March 2011, 7:30pm	Campbelltown Stadium	Ben Cummins; Brett Suttor	14,091
Canberra Raiders	22-35	Wests Tigers	1 May 2011, 2:00pm	Canberra Stadium	Ashley Klein; Gerard Sutton	13,425

=== Head To Head ===
Played	Raiders	Draws	Tigers
5	1	0	4
