= Alan Wilson (rugby league) =

Australian rugby league footballer

Personal information
- Full name: Alan Wilson
- Born: 25 September 1967 (age 59) Australia

Playing information
- Position: Second-row, Lock
Club
Years	Team	Pld	T	G	FG	P
1986–91	Cronulla-Sutherland	105	37	185	2	520
1993	North Sydney	2	0	0	0	0
1994	Cronulla-Sutherland	2	0	0	0	0
1995	St George	2	0	0	0	0
1995	Bradford Northern	7	0	0	0	0
1996	Huddersfield Giants	21	9	1	1	39
	Total	139	46	186	3	559
Representative
Years	Team	Pld	T	G	FG	P
1989	New South Wales	2	0	0	0	0
- Father: Graham Wilson
- Relatives: Craig Wilson (brother); Kevin Hogan (uncle)

Alan Wilson (born 25 September 1967) is an Australian former rugby league footballer. The son of Australian Kangaroos player, Graham Wilson.

== Playing career ==
Wilson was named Dally M rookie of the year in 1987. He played seven seasons for the Cronulla Sharks and is the 5th highest pointscorer for the club. After not being re-signed by the Sharks at the end of 1991, he moved to his brother Craig's club the North Sydney Bears. Alan won a Reserve Grade premiership with the Bears in 1992 before returned to Cronulla.

Wilson could and did play every position. He also went on to represent NSW in State of Origin.

== Post-playing ==
Wilson recently returned to Australia after two years as Technical Advisor with Super League club St. Helens. Before that he spent a year in the NRL marketing department and was the brains behind the highly successful "That's my Team" campaign.

Wilson spent seven years as assistant coach at the Parramatta Eels under Brian Smith from 1998 to 2004 after retiring in 1996 after an 11-year career.

Wilson Coached the first Rabbitohs NYC under 20's side in 2008.
