= Kevin Hogan (rugby league) =

Australian rugby league footballer

Personal information
- Full name: Kevin Bernard Hogan
- Born: 15 January 1945
- Died: 3 August 2020 (aged 75)

Playing information
- Position: Five-eighth, Centre
Club
Years	Team	Pld	T	G	FG	P
1969–73	Cronulla-Sutherland	49	8	0	1	26
1974	Parramatta	14	3	0	0	9
	Total	63	11	0	1	35
- Source: As of 26 November 2024

Kevin Hogan (1945–2020) was an Australian former professional rugby league footballer who played in the 1960s and 1970s. He played for Cronulla-Sutherland and Parramatta in the NSWRL competition.

== Playing career ==
Hogan played lower grades for Newtown before making his first grade debut with Cronulla in round 14 of the 1969 NSWRFL season against South Sydney. In 1971, Hogan captained Cronulla to victory in the final of the Endeavour Cup against Canterbury. Hogan played a total of 49 appearances for Cronulla. He was part of the squad which reached the 1973 Grand Final against Manly but he was not selected for match. In 1974, Hogan joined Parramatta making 14 appearances.

== Post playing ==
Hogan coached the Engadine Dragons and Cronulla's Under 23's side during the 1980s. He later joined Cronulla's board of directors in 1989.
