= David Hatch (rugby league) =

Australian rugby league footballer

Personal information
- Full name: David Hatch
- Born: 18 June 1959 (age 66)

Playing information
- Position: Lock
Club
Years	Team	Pld	T	G	FG	P
1979–90	Cronulla-Sutherland	183	15	0	0	54
- Source: Whiticker/Hudson

David Hatch (born 18 June 1959) is a former professional Rugby League footballer who played for the Cronulla-Sutherland Sharks rugby league team, where he spent twelve seasons.

== Playing career ==
Hatch played many games as captain of the Cronulla-Sutherland Sharks from 1979 to 1990. His position of choice was lock. He played 183 first grade games for the Sharks during his long and successful career, the highlight being Captain when the Sharks won the minor premiership in 1988.

He was named the Dally M Captain of the year in 1985 and 1988.
